= Growing Up Brady (film) =

- Genre: Biography, Drama
- Based on: Growing Up Brady: I Was a Teenage Greg by Barry Williams with Chris Kreski
- Written by: Matt Dorff
- Directed by: Richard A. Colla
- Starring: Adam Brody; Kaley Cuoco; Rebeccah Bush; Kaitlin Cullum; Ricky Ullman; Carly Schroeder; Scott Michael Lookinland; Suanne Spoke; Mark Kassen; Daniel Hugh Kelly; Michael Tucker
- Narrated by: Barry Williams
- Country of origin: United States
- Original language: English

Production
- Executive producers: Kimberly Rubin; Barry Williams
- Producer: Mark H. Ovitz
- Cinematography: Michael D. Margulies
- Editor: Martin Nicholson
- Running time: 100 minutes
- Production companies: Zenna Tree Entertainment; Paramount Television

Original release
- Network: NBC
- Release: May 21, 2000

Related
- The Bradys; The Brady Bunch 35th Anniversary Reunion Special: Still Brady After All These Years

Growing Up Brady is a 2000 American made-for-television biographical film based on the 1992 autobiography Growing Up Brady: I Was a Teenage Greg written by actor Barry Williams with Chris Kreski. Directed by Richard A. Colla, it starred Williams, Adam Brody, Kaley Cuoco, Daniel Hugh Kelly and Michael Tucker, and was originally broadcast May 21, 2000 on NBC.

== Synopsis ==
The movie is about the production of the 1969–1974 ABC sitcom The Brady Bunch, on which Williams played young Greg Brady, with backstage dramas among the cast and the show's producers. However at times some of the scenes have been slightly altered from what actually occurred in real life. The film is dedicated to the memory of Robert Reed.

== Cast ==
- Barry Williams as Himself and Narrator
- Adam Brody as Barry Williams
- Kaley Cuoco as Maureen McCormick
- Daniel Hugh Kelly as Robert Reed
- Rebeccah Bush as Florence Henderson
- Michael Tucker as Sherwood Schwartz
- Michael Fetters as Lloyd J. Schwartz
- Ricky Ullman as Christopher Knight
- Kaitlin Cullum as Eve Plumb
- Scott Michael Lookinland as Mike Lookinland, Scott is also Mike Lookinland's son
- Carly Schroeder as Susan Olsen
- Suanne Spoke as Ann B. Davis
- Barbara Mallory as Frances Whitfield
- Paul Greenberg as Davy Jones
- Marianne McAndrew as Doris Williams
- Sherwood Schwartz as Himself
- Mark Kassen as Eddie Fontaine
- Mike Lookinland as Camera Operator

== Differences from the book ==
In his book, Williams writes that he first kissed McCormick in Hawaii, rather than in a limousine bringing them home from The Who concert in Los Angeles. The flirting between McCormick and Williams while filming for "A Room at the Top" (episode 95) happened a few months before the Hawaii episodes and was boosted for the TV movie. Although in the film Eve Plumb's character is unfazed when a security guard stumbles upon her and Christopher Knight making out in a prop car on the Paramount Pictures backlot, Knight has said Plumb was "mortified" and started to cry. Also a scene where Williams' agent tells him that The Brady Bunch had been canceled is changed somewhat. Instead of drinking a bottle of Bourbon, he is drinking a bottle of Scotch.

== Home media ==
The film was released on DVD in region 1 by Paramount Home Media Distribution in May 2004.

In June 2019, the film was re-released on DVD by CBS/Paramount as a part of The Brady-est Brady Bunch TV & Movie Collection to commemorate the 50th anniversary of the original series.
