= Love to Love You Bradys =

- Author: Susan Olsen with Ted Nichelson and Lisa Sutton
- Language: English
- Genre: Popular Culture
- Publisher: ECW Press (2009)
- Publication date: September 1, 2009
- Publication place: United States
- Pages: 340
- ISBN: 978-1-55022-888-5

Love to Love You Bradys: The Bizarre Story of The Brady Bunch Variety Hour is a 2009 coffee table book written by The Brady Bunch actress Susan Olsen with co-authors Ted Nichelson and Lisa Sutton, about the 1976–77 spin-off TV variety show The Brady Bunch Hour.

The book's release also coincided with the 40th anniversary of the debut of The Brady Bunch.

The book asserts that the spin-off is noteworthy in television history for being, in Olsen's words, "spectacularly bad"; in 2002, it was ranked in the top five worst shows of all time by TV Guide. Olsen details how The Brady Bunch franchise was taken over by the ABC network in 1976 and the rights were awarded to Donny & Marie producers Sid and Marty Krofft (without the knowledge or permission of creator Sherwood Schwartz) to produce an all-new variety show starring The Brady Bunch. Olsen also reveals behind-the-scenes accounts of the actors' private lives during this period of time, including Maureen McCormick's drug abuse and her failure to show up for taping of the show.

The book's title is based on the title of the 1975 disco song "Love to Love You Baby". The variety series was cancelled after nine episodes.

The book features previously unpublished photographs, and interviews, including those with Barry Williams, Maureen McCormick, Christopher Knight, Geri Reischl ("Fake Jan"), Mike Lookinland, Ann B. Davis, Sherwood Schwartz, Lloyd J. Schwartz, Sid and Marty Krofft, Rip Taylor, Bruce Vilanch and Paul Shaffer. Additional memories by cast members Florence Henderson, Robert Reed, and Eve Plumb are also included.
