= Growing Up Brady =

1992 book by Barry Williams with Chris Kreski

Growing Up Brady: I Was a Teenage Greg
- 1992 edition
- Author: Barry Williams with Chris Kreski; Foreword by Robert Reed
- Language: English
- Genre: Autobiography
- Publisher: HarperCollins (1992), Good Guy Entertainment (1999)
- Publication date: May 1, 1992
- Publication place: United States
- Pages: 300
- ISBN: 978-0967378503
- OCLC: 43629360
- Dewey Decimal: 791.45/72 21
- LC Class: PN1992.77.B733 W55 1999

Growing Up Brady: I Was a Teenage Greg is a 1992 autobiography written by actor Barry Williams with Chris Kreski and a foreword by Robert Reed.

== Synopsis ==
In Growing Up Brady, Williams discusses his childhood, the production of the 1969–1974 ABC sitcom The Brady Bunch, his relationship with co-star Maureen McCormick, disputes between series star Robert Reed and creator-producer Sherwood Schwartz, and various Brady Bunch spin-offs. An episode guide to the series is also included, as well as three negative critiques from Reed of the episodes "The Impractical Joker" and "And Now a Word From Our Sponsor" (both 1971), and "The Hair-Brained Scheme" (the series finale from 1974, in which Reed refused to appear).

Two editions of the book exist: the first edition details his Brady co-stars attending his 1990 wedding to Diane Martin; that marriage ended in divorce two years later; the second edition, published several years later, replaces the references to Martin with his impressions of the feature films The Brady Bunch Movie and A Very Brady Sequel, and reflections on Reed's death in 1992 due to cancer and the subsequent media frenzy over the news that Reed had been diagnosed as HIV positive (misreported as AIDS) prior to his death. A third edition was printed in 2000.

== Adaptations ==
The book was adapted into a made-for-television film called Growing Up Brady that aired May 21, 2000 on the NBC network. It starred Michael Tucker as Sherwood Schwartz, Daniel Hugh Kelly as Robert Reed/Mike, Rebeccah Bush as Florence Henderson/Carol, Adam Brody as Williams/Greg, Kaley Cuoco as Maureen McCormick/Marcia, Kaitlin Cullum as Eve Plumb/Jan, Raviv Ullman as Christopher Knight/Peter, Scott Michael Lookinland as Mike Lookinland/Bobby, Carly Schroeder as Susan Olsen/Cindy, and Suanne Spoke as Ann B Davis/Alice.
