= Remote Control (game show) =

Television series

- Genre: Game show
- Presented by: Ken Ober; Colin Quinn with Marisol Massey (Season 1); Kari Wuhrer (Seasons 2–3); Alicia Coppola (Season 4); Susan Ashley (Season 5)
- Starring: Craig Vandenburgh; John Ten Eyck; Adam Sandler; Denis Leary; Roger Kabler; Steve Treccase
- Country of origin: United States
- No. of seasons: 5

Production
- Production locations: Matrix Studios; Manhattan, New York (Seasons 1–2 and 4–5); Disney-MGM Studios; Lake Buena Vista, Florida (Season 3)
- Running time: 30 Minutes

Original release
- Network: MTV (1987–1990); Syndicated (1989–1990)
- Release: December 7, 1987 – December 13, 1990

Remote Control is an American TV game show that ran on MTV for five seasons from 1987 until 1990. It was MTV's first original non-musical program and first game show. A concurrent syndicated version of the series ran during the 1989–1990 season and was distributed by Viacom. Three contestants answered trivia questions on movies, music, and television, many of which were presented in skit format.

The series was created and developed by producers Joe Davola and Michael Dugan. It was written by Michael Armstrong (head writer seasons 2–3), Desmond Devlin, Emily Dodi, Michael Dugan (head writer season 1), Lee Frank, Bob Giordano, Phil Gurin, Keith Kaczorek (also credited as Kadillac Keith),Chris Kreski (head writer seasons 4–5), Denis Leary, Andrew Price, Colin Quinn, Ned Rice, Richard G. Rosner, Adam Sandler, McPaul Smith and John Ten Eyck. It was directed by Dana Calderwood, Scott Fishman and Milt Lage.

== Cast ==
Remote Control was hosted by Ken Ober and featured Colin Quinn as the announcer/sidekick. Quinn hosted the final episodes as Ober was away filming the short-lived series Parenthood. John Ten Eyck played several walk-on parts, joined in later seasons by Adam Sandler, Denis Leary, and Roger Kabler. Steve Treccase provided music; Marisol Massey (season 1), Kari Wuhrer (seasons 2–3), Alicia Coppola (season 4) and Susan Ashley (season 5) were the hostesses.

== Premise ==
The show's theme song explains that Ober was addicted to television growing up and desperately wanted to be a game show host. To make his dream come true, he set up the basement of his childhood home as a television studio.

== Set ==
Remote Control was taped in a Manhattan television studio set up to resemble a basement, complete with a washer and dryer, water heater, bric-a-brac, and a giant Pez dispenser that resembled Bob Eubanks.

The basement set was a mainstay of the show throughout its run; however, its decor was "rearranged" slightly every season. The contestants sat in leather La-Z-Boy recliners with seat belts, complete with retro kidney-shaped tables and scoreboards, facing host Ober and his retro-styled Zenith television. Behind Ober were framed portraits of his idols, game show hosts Eubanks, Bob Barker, Bill Cullen, Bert Convy, Monty Hall, and Tom Kennedy. Musician Steve Treccase set up his keyboard behind a cluttered bar, at which Quinn and the hostess usually sat for the duration of the show. More clutter could be found around and behind the audience, very frequently including props used in previous seasons. Finally, the contestants' chairs were placed in front of breakaway walls, through which they were unmercifully pulled if they were eliminated.

== Gameplay ==
Three contestants sitting in lounge chairs would select one of nine channels on a big-screen television that stood beside Ober; each channel represented a subject having to do with pop culture. Channels covered a wide variety of topics, and included topics such as "The Bon Jovi Network", "Brady Physics", and "Dead or Canadian". Contestants rang in to answer a series of toss-up questions from those subjects to earn points, losing points for an incorrect response. Most channels contained three questions of increasing value, although certain special categories would have either one or two questions. The identity of each channel was only revealed when it was first chosen during a round.

In the first round, the three questions in a standard category were worth 5, 10, and 15 points, in that order. Point values were doubled for the second round, with a new set of nine channels in play. The contestant who answered a question correctly could either stay with the current channel or select a different one; after the last question in a channel was asked, it was taken out of play for the rest of the round.

=== Categories/Channels ===
Many categories dealt with specific television shows, characters, or genres. Others focused on topics such as celebrities, trivia, and commercials. Categories fell into one of the following general types.

- Standard: humorously worded questions asked by Ober
- Performance-based: questions based on skits or songs acted out by one or more supporting cast members.
- One-time use: a single question or chance to score points, often involving a survey or comedy performance, such as "Sing Along with Colin", where Colin Quinn would begin a few lines of a song and the contestant needed to correctly add the last line to score the points.
- Beat the clock: Often worded as "Beat the Baloney" or "Beat the Bishop", a character dressed in costume would make his way through the audience while the contestant was assigned a math problem. Correctly answering the problem before the character circumambulated the studio would earn points.
- Penalty: a channel that resulted in a hidden message where the contestant would be assessed a penalty. Often done as "Wheel of Torture", where the contestant would be given the option to forgo the torture for a penalty or be awarded points if they endured a schoolyard-type torture from Colin Quinn, such as "Charley Horse", "Noogie", "Purple Nurple" or "Wet Willy". (If a female contestant did this and was selected for "Purple Nurple", the wheel was re-spun.)

MTV was always one of the available channels, and presented questions associated with music and music videos.

=== Snack Break ===
At the end of the first round, the contestants were treated to a snack; however, as they were guests of an unconventional host, the snacks were delivered in unusual ways. In the vast majority of episodes, the contestants held bowls above their heads to catch the snack as it was dumped onto them from above, such as popcorn or candy. When the nature of the snack such as cheese and crackers made this method impractical, it would be lowered from above on trays or delivered by the hostess. In some episodes, each contestant was hit with a pie in the face. Sometimes, the snacks would be delivery from a bistro or a pizza place.

During the first season, the Snack Break occurred in the middle of the round, and the contestant in the lead at that point had the chance to win a small prize by correctly guessing which one of three refrigerators held it (similar to the Big Deal on Let's Make a Deal). The other two each held a revolting food item.

=== Off the Air ===
One of the signature features of Remote Control was the way in which contestants were eliminated from play. After round two, the TV went "Off the Air" (accompanied by a siren sound effect and the studio lights flashing on and off), and the contestant in last place at that moment was also thrown "Off the Air" and eliminated from the game. If there was a tie for last place, there was no elimination. Eliminated contestants were removed immediately, chair and all (hence the seat belts). Beginning late in the first season, the audience would also sing a "goodbye song," typically "Na Na Hey Hey Kiss Him Goodbye," "Hit the Road Jack," or "Hey You, Get Off of My Show" (to the tune of "Get Off of My Cloud"), while said contestant was being ejected. After a contestant was ejected, he/she would be tormented by stagehands administering various annoyances behind him/her while an unrealistic screaming sound effect played. The ejections were accomplished in a variety of ways.

The setup in the first season was very basic. All three contestants were seated in front of breakaway sections in the wall behind them. Upon elimination, the losing contestant was simply pulled in their chair through that section of the wall, which would fall backwards allowing the chair to continue sliding behind the stage. Upon being pulled through, a black curtain was dropped concealing the contestant. Most of the time this was accompanied by the camera shaking violently and a "static" effect to simulate the TV (and the contestant, as mentioned by Ober) going "Off the Air." On occasion, the chair would return through the wall with the contestant replaced by a skeleton or something else indicating that he or she had been "killed."

The second season was the first to feature three different kinds of eliminations; also, the camera effects were removed. The contestant on the audience's left was pulled backstage through a hidden trap door in the wall, which then closed behind him/her. The contestant in the center sat in front of a large doorway covered with blue paper; upon elimination; he/she was pulled backwards, tearing through it, and a black curtain was lowered over the opening. When the contestant on the right was eliminated, the floor and wall sections around him/her pivoted backwards by 90 degrees, so that the underside of the floor became the wall from the audience's perspective as the contestant was flipped out of view.

The third and fourth seasons presented some minor modifications. The flipping chair was now to the audience's left, while the center chair was pulled through a breakaway wall and curtain similar to those used in the first season. The contestant on the right was eliminated by being pulled backwards, with the wall section behind him/her rotating 180 degrees horizontally to expose a section of exterior house siding, implying that the contestant had been ejected from the house altogether.

For the fifth season, the curtain behind the breakaway wall was replaced by a black wall with a pattern of jail cell bars, and the wall behind the contestant on the right rotated vertically instead of horizontally.

On at least two occasions (including a 1988 Christmas episode in which the three contestants were actors playing the "Three Wise Men"), the contestants performed so badly in Round 1 that Ober decided to have them all yanked "Off the Air" at the end of it. The scores were reset to zero, and three new contestants took their places to complete the game.

=== Lightning round ===
During the first season, after the TV went "Off the Air", gameplay continued as normal with the remaining two contestants until time expired. Beginning with the second season, this format was scrapped for a "lightning round" to determine the winner.

For the second through fourth seasons, the two remaining contestants played a "Think Real Fast" lightning round, answering as many toss-up questions as possible in 30 seconds and receiving 10 points per correct answer. Typically, contestants had to supply a missing word in a title or correct a wrong one. When time ran out, the high scorer advanced to the bonus round and the second-place contestant was eliminated. In the event of a two-way tie for second place or a three-way tie when the TV went "Off the Air," no one was eliminated at that point; all three contestants played Think Real Fast, and the second- and third-place scorers were both removed at its end.

In the fifth season, all three contestants played a variation of the lightning round called "This, That, or the Other Thing." Every question had to be answered with one of three similar-sounding choices given by Ober at the start of the round (e.g., "Andy Taylor, Andy Warhol, or Andy Rooney"). The round lasted for 20 seconds, and each answer was worth 10 points; at its end, the TV went "Off the Air" and the third-place scorer was eliminated. The remaining two contestants then played a final question, described below.

=== Final question ===
In the final season, and the second half of the syndicated version, the two remaining contestants bet any or all of their current score on one final question, usually a math problem. Once the contestants had written down their wagers, Ober read the question and they had 20 seconds to answer it while a bizarre distraction was performed. After time expired, the answers and wagers were checked; a correct answer added a contestant's wager to his/her score, while a miss deducted it.

=== Tiebreaker ===
In all seasons, the surviving contestant with the highest score won the game and a collection of prizes, and went on to the Grand Prize Round. In the event of a tie after the last round, Ober would pull a tiebreaker question from the giant Pez dispenser in the corner; a correct answer won the game, while a miss gave the win to the opponent.

=== Grand prize round ===
==== MTV version (first 4 seasons) ====
The contestant was strapped to a "Craftmatic adjustable bed", facing a wall of nine TV sets (including two turned sideways and one placed upside down) that were each playing a different music video simultaneously. The contestant had to identify the artists in the videos; each correct response awarded a prize and shut off that TV. Correctly identifying all nine artists within 30 seconds won the grand prize, usually a car or a trip ($5,000 in celebrity episodes). Before the clock started ticking, the contestant was given a split-second glimpse of every video at once. He/she could pass on a video and return to it after playing through all nine if time remained on the clock.

==== Syndicated version ====
Due to copyright issues, music videos could not be used on the syndicated episodes. Instead, the contestant was strapped to a spinning horizontal wheel surrounded by 10 numbered television monitors and was asked 10 questions (usually about TV). For each question successfully answered, the contestant won a prize and the message "Grand Prize" appeared on the corresponding screen. The contestant had three seconds to answer each question, and could not return to passed or missed questions. After all questions had been asked, the wheel was allowed to slow to a stop, and if the contestant's head pointed to a screen that displayed "Grand Prize", he won the day's top prize in addition to any prizes for his correct answers. A contestant who correctly answered every question automatically won the grand prize. A similar bonus round was used on the British version.

==== MTV version (season 5) ====
The "name the artist" round was modified to more resemble the syndicated bonus round. The contestant was strapped to a spinning metal wheel placed at a 45-degree angle, with a single TV above it and another below it. As Colin Quinn and other cast members spun the wheel, the contestant had to identify the artists of nine videos that were shown in succession on both screens at once. Correctly identifying all artists in 40 seconds awarded the grand prize. The contestant could pass on a video and return to it later if time permitted.

== Spring Break episodes ==
Like most MTV shows of the period, Remote Control taped episodes on-location during the network's annual Spring Break event. The gameplay was altered to account for the absence of the regular studio's equipment and props as follows.

- Contestants sat either in beach chairs on platforms that extended over the edge of a swimming pool, or in director's chairs near it.
- The nine channels were represented by college-age men and women in swimwear and numbered T-shirts. When a channel was selected, that person removed his/her shirt to reveal a sash marked with the channel name.
- In some episodes, the contestants were given trays of snack food items (such as hot dogs) at the end of the first round and received 5 points for each one they ate before the second round ended. Once the extra points were tallied, the game ended and the two lowest scorers were pushed/thrown into the pool by stagehands. Other episodes followed the same elimination rules as the regular show, with the TV going "Off the Air" and the lowest scorer being tipped/pushed/thrown into the pool, followed by a lightning round to decide the winner.
- For the grand prize round, the winner lay on a floating lounge chair in the pool and had to identify the artists in nine music videos, each displayed for four seconds on a single monitor.

== Celebrities ==
Celebrities that appeared on the show included:

- Nipsey Russell – the "Poet Laureate of Television", who occasionally presented some of his poems.
- Bob Eubanks – sat by host Ober for the entire main game, and "coached" him on how to host a game show.
- "Weird Al" Yankovic – came into the basement as a category/channel. In addition, he also "tortured" that episode's two losing contestants as they were eliminated. (This was the only time that the backstage portion of the set behind the contestant area was shown.)
- LL Cool J – made a brief appearance in one skit, where Ober stormed off stage to discover the rapper and his brother goofing around.
- Jerry Mathers – appeared during the second half of a season three episode.
- MC Hammer – appeared as an announcer during one of the final episodes, which were shot on location in Daytona Beach, Florida.

Celebrities that played the game:

- One episode featured Phil McConkey of the NFL's New York Giants playing against Sidney Green of the NBA's New York Knicks (with his then very young son Taurean on the set throughout the show). The third contestant was series regular John Ten Eyck playing Steve Sax of Major League baseball's Los Angeles Dodgers. Ten Eyck intentionally gave foolish, incorrect answers as Sax, who had canceled his scheduled appearance at the last minute.
- While in syndication, Remote Control had a "World Class Athletes Day" with pro athletes who lost out on championships in recent seasons. The three contestants were Cincinnati Bengals quarterback Boomer Esiason, New York Mets pitcher David Cone and New York Rangers defenseman Ron Greschner.
- LL Cool J, Julie Brown, and "Weird Al" Yankovic played for charity during the second season, with Yankovic winning.
- Heavy metal musicians "Dizzy" Dean Davidson of Britny Fox, Lorraine Lewis of Femme Fatale, and Anthrax's Charlie Benante played against each other in season three.
- Former child stars Brandon Cruz, Butch Patrick, and Danny Bonaduce played in season three.
- Former Brady Bunch actors Barry Williams, Eve Plumb, and Susan Olsen played in the first aired episode of the syndicated run. This episode led to a writing partnership between Williams and Remote Control head writer Chris Kreski, who co-authored the best-selling Growing Up Brady biography.
- The Red Hot Chili Peppers were contestants in the final MTV season.
- Kathy Orr, former Chief Meteorologist for KYW-TV in Philadelphia, Pennsylvania and now an evening meteorologist with crosstown WTXF, appeared on the show as a regular contestant.
- ESPN anchor John Buccigross appeared on the show as a regular contestant.

== International versions ==
Country	Local name	Host	Channel	Year aired
Australia	The Great TV Game Show	Richard Stubbs	Network Ten	1989
Brazil	Controle Remoto	Fausto Silva	Rede Globo	1989
Greece	Remote Control	Petros Filipidis	Star Channel	1996
Italy	Urka!	Paolo Bonolis	Italia 1	1991
Puerto Rico	Control Remoto	Xavier Serbiá	WAPA-TV	1989
United Kingdom	Remote Control	Anthony H. Wilson	Channel 4	1991–1992

- A Puerto Rican version entitled Control Remoto, hosted by former Menudo member Xavier Serbiá, was canceled after 3 months on WAPA-TV in 1989 because MTV threatened a lawsuit for copyright infringement.
- A British version of the show was co-produced by Action Time Productions and Granada Television and aired on Channel 4 from 1991 to 1992. It was hosted by Anthony H. Wilson and featured comedians Phil Cornwell and John Thomson plus keyboardist Yolisa Pharle, with guest appearances by the characters Frank Sidebottom, Sister Mary Immaculate and Mrs Merton (both played by Caroline Aherne), plus Brenda Gilhooly as a 'yoof' TV presenter.
- An Australian version aired on Network Ten in 1989 under the name The Great TV Game Show. It was hosted by Russell Stubbs with Jane Holmes and the regular panelists were Russell Fletcher, Margie Nunn, Linda Gibson, and Michael Blair. The show failed to see out the year along with a number of Network Ten game shows that were launched at around the same time.
- The Italian version of the show was called Urka!, which was hosted by Paolo Bonolis and aired on Italia 1 only in 1991.
- A Brazilian version of the show called Controle Remoto, hosted by Fausto Silva aired on Rede Globo in 1989.

== Merchandise ==
- A board game based on the show was released by Pressman in 1989.
- In 1989, a video game based on Remote Control was licensed for multiple platforms, including the Apple II, Commodore 64, NES, the last of which was released in 1990. The video games were published by Hi Tech Expressions. The game remained quite similar to the show. The NES version omitted the final round, replacing it with a "Think Real Fast" round between the top two contestants.
- 1990 also saw an MS-DOS version released; like the NES version, it has no endgame. The contestant in last place is eliminated when the TV goes "Off the Air" in the middle of the second round instead of at the end. The other two contestants then complete the round, and then play a "Think Real Fast" round.
