= The Brady Bunch 35th Anniversary Reunion Special: Still Brady After All These Years =

- Genre: Television special
- Presented by: Jenny McCarthy
- Starring: Florence Henderson; Ann B. Davis; Barry Williams; Maureen McCormick; Christopher Knight; Eve Plumb; Mike Lookinland; Susan Olsen; Sherwood Schwartz
- Country of origin: United States
- Original language: English

Production
- Executive producers: Sal Maniaci; Lloyd J. Schwartz; Sherwood Schwartz
- Producers: Benjamin DeJesus; Hope Juber; Michael Petok
- Editor: Thomas M. Bolger
- Camera setup: Multi-camera
- Running time: 45–48 minutes
- Production company: Sherwood Schwartz Productions

Original release
- Network: TV Land
- Release: September 29, 2004

Related
- Growing Up Brady

The Brady Bunch 35th Anniversary Reunion Special: Still Brady After All These Years is a 2004 American television special hosted by Jenny McCarthy that reunited all the living cast members of the 1969–1974 ABC sitcom The Brady Bunch, who spoke about the shows and answered questions. It aired September 29, 2004 on TV Land.

== Host ==
- Jenny McCarthy

== Cast members ==
- Florence Henderson
- Ann B. Davis
- Barry Williams
- Maureen McCormick
- Christopher Knight
- Eve Plumb
- Mike Lookinland
- Susan Olsen
- Sherwood Schwartz

== Awards ==
- Nominated Daytime Emmy Award for Outstanding Special Class Special 2005
