= A Very Brady Christmas =

1988 television film directed by Peter Baldwin

- Genre: Comedy drama
- Written by: Sherwood Schwartz; Lloyd J. Schwartz
- Directed by: Peter Baldwin
- Starring: Robert Reed; Florence Henderson; Ann B. Davis; Barry Williams; Maureen McCormick; Christopher Knight; Eve Plumb; Mike Lookinland; Jennifer Runyon
- Theme music composer: Frank De Vol (main title)
- Composer: Laurence Juber
- Country of origin: United States

Production
- Executive producer: Sherwood Schwartz
- Producers: Lloyd J. Schwartz; Barry Berg
- Production locations: 15434 Sutton Street, Sherman Oaks, California; Paramount Studios – 5555 Melrose Avenue, Hollywood, Los Angeles, California
- Cinematography: Isidore Mankofsky
- Editor: Steve Shultz
- Running time: 100 minutes
- Production companies: The Sherwood Schwartz Company; Paramount Television

Original release
- Network: CBS
- Release: December 18, 1988

Related
- The Brady Bunch; The Bradys

A Very Brady Christmas is a 1988 American made-for-television Christmas comedy-drama film directed by Peter Baldwin and starring Robert Reed, Florence Henderson, Ann B. Davis, Barry Williams, Maureen McCormick, Christopher Knight, Eve Plumb, Mike Lookinland, and Jennifer Runyon. It reunited the original cast members of the 1969–1974 sitcom The Brady Bunch with the exception of Susan Olsen, who was replaced by Jennifer Runyon (popularly called "Christmas Cindy"). Ron Kuhlman and Jerry Houser both reprised their characters from the short-lived 1981 sitcom The Brady Brides.

A Very Brady Christmas premiered on CBS on December 18, 1988, and was the second highest-rated television film of 1988.

== Plot ==
Mike and Carol Brady have a savings account, which both spouses planned to use to bankroll a vacation for the other; Carol wanted to take Mike to Greece, while Mike wanted to treat Carol to a trip to Japan. When they realize their ideas collide, they use the money to try to reunite the entire family for Christmas by paying for airline tickets for their children, grandchildren and their in-laws.

However, all of the Brady kids are facing personal obstacles that might keep them from enjoying the festivities: Greg's wife Nora is spending Christmas with her family; Peter is romantically involved with his boss Valerie and his inferior position and salary is affecting his self-confidence; Bobby has dropped out of graduate school to become a race car driver but has not revealed this to his parents; Marcia's husband Wally was fired from his job at a toy company; Jan is separating from her husband Phillip and Cindy is fighting for her independence since she is the youngest and still gets treated like the baby of the family. Cindy is currently a college undergraduate and in an issue similar to Bobby's, Cindy lies to her parents about overwhelming college student issues, when in actuality she plans to go skiing in Aspen with her roommates.

Even their former housekeeper Alice is dealing with a serious issue: her husband Sam has recently left her for another woman. Through each child deciding to spend the holiday and eventually opening up about their issues, Mike and Carol are able to help them out. Jan got back together with Phillip, Bobby told his family about that NASCAR racing circuit, and Wally got a new job at Mike's friend's toy company. Nora arrives to surprise Greg, but the family's Christmas dinner is disrupted when Mike learns that a ruthless businessman he designed a building for has cut corners, resulting in the building collapsing and trapping two security guards inside. Mike manages to free the trapped employees, but an aftershock results in Mike getting trapped in rubble himself.

In the end, Mike gets out of the debris after Carol and the entire family sings "O Come, All Ye Faithful" (a nod to Carol singing it in the original series' episode "The Voice of Christmas"). After returning home, the family's dinner is again interrupted, this time by a man at the door dressed as Santa Claus. The kids ask where his bag of presents is, but he tells them that he only has one present, for Alice; it turns out to be Sam, in disguise, who has seen the error of his ways and pleads for Alice's forgiveness. After she takes Sam back, the family invites him to stay for dinner, and everyone ends the film singing a chorus of "We Wish You a Merry Christmas".

== Cast ==
- Robert Reed as Mike Brady
- Florence Henderson as Carol Brady, Mike's 2nd wife
- Ann B. Davis as Alice Nelson-Franklin, Brady's housekeeper
- Barry Williams as Dr. Greg Brady, Mike's first son
- Maureen McCormick as Marcia Brady-Logan, Carol's first daughter
- Christopher Knight as Peter Brady, Mike's second son
- Eve Plumb as Jan Brady-Covington, Carol's second daughter
- Mike Lookinland as Bobby Brady, Mike's third son
- Jennifer Runyon as Cindy Brady, Carol's third daughter
- Lewis Arquette as Sam Franklin, Alice's husband
- Jerry Houser as Wally Logan, Marcia's husband
- Ron Kuhlman as Phillip Covington III, Jan's husband
- Caryn Richman as Nora Brady, Greg's wife
- Carol Huston as Valerie Thomas, Peter's fiancée
- Jaclyn Bernstein as Jessica Logan, Marcia & Wally's daughter
- G.W. Lee as Mickey Logan, Marcia & Wally's son
- Zachary Bostrom as Kevin Brady, Greg & Nora's son

Susan Olsen, the original Cindy Brady, was not in this production due to a combination of salary negotiations and timing conflicting with her honeymoon.

== Impact ==
When A Very Brady Christmas first aired, it was the highest rated television film of the season with a 25.1 rating and a 39 share but ultimately finished as the second highest rated television film of the season. Thanks in large part to the film's success, CBS and Sherwood Schwartz created a new television series in 1990, The Bradys, continuing the story of the Brady family and its now-adult children. Only six episodes were produced. Critics nicknamed the new series "Brady-something", after the adult-oriented TV drama Thirtysomething, highlighting the fact that this new Brady series had a more serious tone and more dramatic storylines as compared to the original series.

After the network canceled The Bradys, two theatrical films were made later in the 1990s: The Brady Bunch Movie in 1995, and A Very Brady Sequel in 1996. A second sequel, The Brady Bunch in the White House, aired as a made-for-television film on Fox in 2002. All three featured a new, younger cast filling the roles of the Bradys.

== Home media ==
In November 1992, Paramount Home Video released A Very Brady Christmas on VHS, but it has long been out of print.

In April 2007, the film was included as a bonus feature on The Brady Bunch: The Complete Series 21-disc DVD set by CBS/Paramount.

CBS/Paramount released A Very Brady Christmas as a stand-alone DVD on October 10, 2017.

The film was re-released on DVD by CBS/Paramount in June 2019 as a part of The Brady-est Brady Bunch TV & Movie Collection to commemorate the 50th anniversary of the original series.

== See also ==
- The Brady Bunch
- The Bradys
- A Very Brady Renovation
- List of Christmas films
