= Blending Christmas =

- Written by: Adam Rockoff; Jeffrey Schenck; Peter Sullivan
- Directed by: Marla Sokoloff
- Starring: Haylie Duff; Aaron O'Connell; Christopher Knight; Robbie Rist; Susan Olsen; Barry Williams; Mike Lookinland; Jennifer Elise Cox
- Country of origin: United States
- Original language: English

Original release
- Network: Lifetime
- Release: 2021

Blending Christmas is a 2021 television film starring Haylie Duff, Aaron O'Connell and various actors from The Brady Bunch television series. It was originally broadcast on Lifetime on December 12, 2021 as part of the network's "It's a Wonderful Lifetime" holiday movie slate.

== Plot ==
Emma, a PR manager, dreams of getting the perfect proposal from her longterm boyfriend, Liam. Liam, who’s totally going to propose, decides to make the moment even more special by whisking Emma off for one last Christmas and he invites both his and her families along for the trip.

== Critical reception ==
Decider wrote "The idea of bringing the Bradys together again for a Lifetime Christmas movie is inherently a good one. The Brady Bunch as a franchise includes two perennial holiday favorites as far as I’m concerned: the Brady Bunch Season 1 episode "The Voice of Christmas" and the 1988 TV movie A Very Brady Christmas. That’s why it’s such a bummer that Blending Christmas is so dull."
