= Jerry Houser =

American television, film and voice actor (b. 1952)

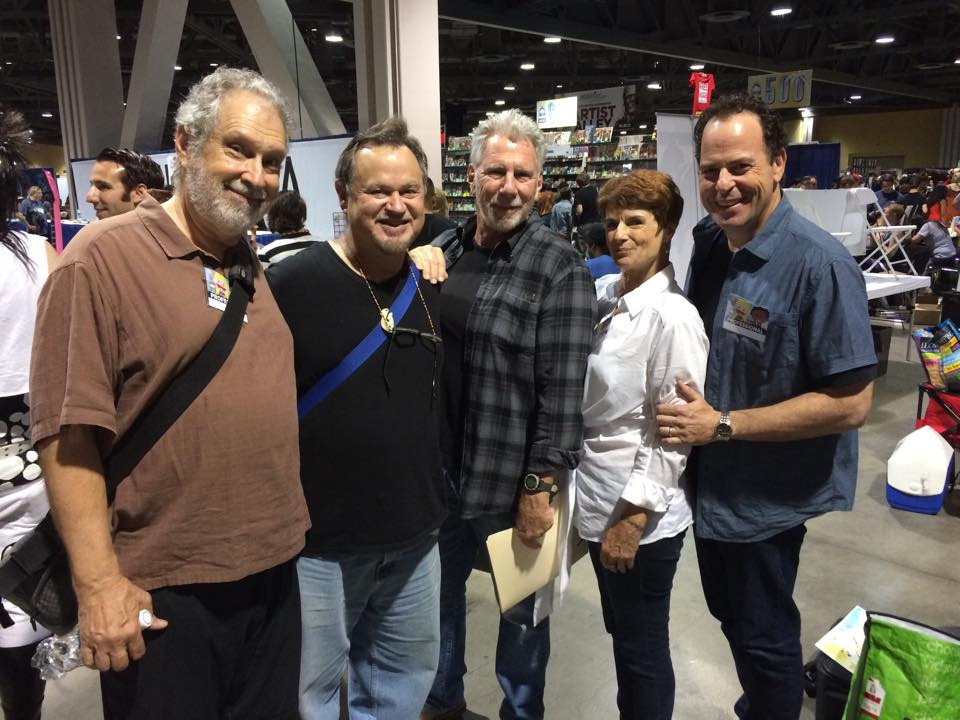
- From left to right: Bill Ratner, Gregg Berger, Jerry Houser, Mary McDonald-Lewis, and Loren Lester
- Born: July 14, 1952 (age 74); Los Angeles, California, U.S.
- Occupation: Actor
- Years active: 1971–2006

Jerry Houser (born July 14, 1952) is an American former actor. He is best known for his role as Oscar "Oscy" Seltzer in Summer of '42 and its sequel, Class of '44, as Dave "Killer" Carlson in Slap Shot, and as Wally Logan, the husband of Marcia Brady, in various Brady Bunch spin-offs throughout the 1980s and 1990s.

== Early years ==
Houser was born in Los Angeles, and attended North Hollywood High School.

== Career ==
From 1971 to 2006, he appeared in many films, TV series, animated series, and commercials. Some of his most notable appearances are Summer of '42, Slap Shot with Paul Newman, and in the Brady Bunch spin-offs as Marcia's husband, Wally Logan.

On television, Houser portrayed Muff on We'll Get By, orderly Haskell on The New Temperatures Rising Show, Steve Frazier, Maude Findlay's nephew, in the Maude episode "Maude's Nephew", and Jeremy Fenton on It Takes Two. He also provided the voices of Grizzle on Zazoo U, Sully on Danger Rangers, Scrawny Guard in Disney's Aladdin, and Bartholomew on The Gary Coleman Show.

== Filmography ==
- Bad Company — Arthur Simms
- Summer of '42 — Oscar "Oscy" Seltzer
- Class of '44 (1973 film) — Oscar "Oscy" Seltzer
- Barnaby Jones — Monte
- The F.B.I. — Cliff Tetlow
- Seems Like Old Times — Gas Station Attendant
- Miracle on Ice — Les Auge
- Slap Shot — Dave "Killer" Carlson
- We'll Get By — Muff Platt
- M*A*S*H — Danker
- The Brady Brides — Wally Logan
- A Very Brady Christmas — Wally Logan
- The Bradys — Wally Logan
- McGee and Me! — Phillip "Phil" Monroe Sr.
- Magic — Taxi Driver
- S.O.S. Titanic — Daniel Marvin
- Years of the Beast — Gary Reed
- Scooby-Doo Meets the Boo Brothers — Meako
- Nick & Noel — Nick
- Annabelle's Wish — Slim
- Charlotte's Web 2: Wilbur's Great Adventure — Mr. Zuckerman
- The Smurfs — Additional voices
- The Biskitts — Shiner
- Transformers — Sandstorm
- G.I. Joe: A Real American Hero — Sci-Fi
- Tom & Jerry Kids — Urfo, Dragon
- TaleSpin — Badger Goon
- Darkwing Duck — Ham String
- Goof Troop — Duke, Spud, Beast
- Disney's Aladdin — Scrawny Guard, additional voices
- Droopy, Master Detective — Additional voices
- I Yabba-Dabba Do! — Bamm-Bamm Rubble
- Hollyrock-a-Bye Baby — Bamm-Bamm Rubble
- Marvel: Ultimate Alliance — Hank Pym
- Darkness Before Dawn — Jellyfish
- Adventures in Odyssey — Ben Shepard and Jellyfish
- Secret Adventures — Mr. Toaster
- As Told by Ginger ― Principal Milty
- A Pup Named Scooby-Doo - Al from Al's Skate Shop - "Scooby Dude"
- Danger Rangers — Sully
- Marvel: Ultimate Alliance — Hank Pym (final role)
