= The Bradys =

1990 television series

- Genre: Comedy drama
- Written by: Ed Scharlach; Lloyd J. Schwartz; Sherwood Schwartz; Sandra Kay Siegel
- Directed by: Bruce Bilson; Nancy Malone; Dick Martin; Bob Sweeney
- Starring: Robert Reed; Florence Henderson; Ann B. Davis; Barry Williams; Leah Ayres; Christopher Knight; Eve Plumb; Mike Lookinland; Susan Olsen
- Theme music composer: Frank De Vol (main title)
- Opening theme: "The Bradys" performed by Florence Henderson
- Ending theme: "The Bradys" (instrumental)
- Composer: Laurence Juber
- Country of origin: United States
- No. of seasons: 1
- No. of episodes: 6

Production
- Executive producers: Sherwood Schwartz; Lloyd J. Schwartz
- Producer: Barry Berg
- Cinematography: King Baggot
- Editor: Steve Shultz
- Camera setup: Multi-camera
- Running time: 44–48 minutes
- Production companies: Brady Productions; Paramount Television

Original release
- Network: CBS
- Release: February 9 – March 9, 1990

Related
- A Very Brady Christmas; The Brady Bunch

The Bradys is an American comedy-drama television series that aired on CBS from February 9 to March 9, 1990. The series is a sequel and continuation of the original 1969–1974 sitcom The Brady Bunch, focusing on its main characters as adults, and was the second such continuation after the 1981 sitcom The Brady Brides.

Airing on Friday nights, The Bradys failed in the ratings against Full House and Family Matters as part of the TGIF lineup on ABC and was canceled after one month; the last of the six episodes produced aired on March 9, 1990. In its short run, the show went through three different theme songs based on that of The Brady Bunch, the last featuring revised lyrics sung by Florence Henderson.

== Cast ==
- Robert Reed as Mike Brady
- Florence Henderson as Carol Brady, Mike's 2nd wife
- Ann B. Davis as Alice Nelson-Franklin, Brady's housekeeper
- Barry Williams as Dr. Greg Brady, Mike's first (eldest) son
- Christopher Knight as Peter Brady, Mike's second (middle) son
- Mike Lookinland as Bobby Brady, Mike's third (last) son
- Leah Ayres as Marcia Brady-Logan, Carol's first (eldest) daughter
  - An uncredited child actor portrays a young Marcia Brady in the series's opening credits sequence.
- Eve Plumb as Jan Brady-Covington, Carol's second (middle) daughter
- Susan Olsen as Cindy Brady, Carol's third (last) daughter
- Jerry Houser as Wally Logan, Marcia's husband
- Ron Kuhlman as Phillip Covington III, Jan's husband
- Caryn Richman as Nora Brady, Greg's wife
- Martha Quinn as Tracy Wagner-Brady, Bobby's wife
- Ken Michelman as Gary Greenberg, Cindy's radio station manager and love interest
- Jaclyn Bernstein as Jessica Logan, Marcia & Wally's daughter
- Michael Melby as Mickey Logan, Marcia & Wally's son
- Jonathan Taylor Thomas (credited as Jonathan Weiss) as Kevin Brady, Greg & Nora's son
- Valerie Ick as Patty Covington, Jan & Phillip's adopted daughter from Korea

== Influence and casting ==
In 1988, CBS commissioned a Brady Bunch reunion telefilm for its Christmas season programming. A Very Brady Christmas premiered on December 18 and drew a 25.1 rating and 39 share, very high ratings for a television film at the time. The success of the film convinced series creator Sherwood Schwartz that two more TV movies about the Brady family could be a hit, and work began on the show in December 1989. Originally, they decided to follow the formula of A Very Brady Christmas and make two more holiday-themed films: Bobby's auto-racing career would have been the centerpiece of a Memorial Day movie, where he would participate in Indianapolis 500, while Mike running for city council would be an Election Day movie. However, as CBS felt that it would be more lucrative as a series, it was instead commissioned as a weekly series. CBS re-aired A Very Brady Christmas on December 22, 1989, using it as a promotional tool for the upcoming new show.

Robert Reed, Florence Henderson, Ann B. Davis, Barry Williams, Christopher Knight, Eve Plumb, Mike Lookinland and Susan Olsen all returned in their original roles from The Brady Bunch. Jerry Houser and Ron Kuhlman, also, reprised their roles from The Brady Brides. While Maureen McCormick had appeared in A Very Brady Christmas, she declined to return for this series, having just given birth to her daughter, and thus unwilling to commit to a weekly grind after a last-minute switch from TV movies to a weekly series; in addition, having dealt with substance issues in the past, she was not keen on the storyline of Marcia becoming an alcoholic.

== Style ==
The Bradys involved more dramatic storytelling than that which viewers had seen in the previous Brady series. Unlike the original 30-minute sitcom, The Bradys was an hour long and featured far more serious plot lines. Among them:

- Family patriarch Mike begins a political career.
- Greg is now an obstetrician and married to a nurse named Nora. They have a son named Kevin (played by Jonathan Taylor Thomas).
- Bobby's budding auto-racing career ends abruptly in the first episode after an accident leaves him a paraplegic. As he recovers, he marries his college girlfriend.
- Peter breaks up with his fiancée, to whom he became engaged in A Very Brady Christmas, and begins dating the abusive daughter of Mike's political rival.
- Jan and Phillip, unable to conceive children of their own, adopt a Korean girl named Patty.
- Marcia, a stay-at-home mother, battles alcoholism while Wally loses yet another in a series of jobs, the latest being one of Mike's assistants at City Hall. Wally and Marcia, who have been forced to move in with Mike and Carol along with their two children, open a catering business to support their family, with Greg's and Bobby's spouses as partners.
- Radio host Cindy begins a romance with her boss, a widower more than ten years her senior who has two children.

Despite the more dramatic tone, the show did include a laugh track.

An unproduced script had Mike Brady die in a helicopter accident when he went to check out a progress at a fire break and the chopper hit a downdraft due to a wind shear caused by a flame. The script also called for Carol to sing at the funeral. In addition, Jan would have finally gotten pregnant, Gary would have proposed to Cindy and Peter would have taken over Mike's position as city councilman and the Mobile Trauma Unit that he helped build would have been named after Mike.

== Episodes ==
No.	Title	Directed by	Written by	Original release date	Prod. code
1	"Start Your Engines"	Bruce Bilson	Sherwood Schwartz & Lloyd J. Schwartz	February 9, 1990	1-1
Cindy is a morning radio DJ, and Bobby is now a race car driver. He makes it to the Nashville 500 where he is in a serious car wreck and paralyzed from the waist down. Marcia, her husband Wally (who has lost another job) and their kids move in with Mike and Carol. Peter breaks up with his business-minded fiancée Valerie (Mary Cadorette) and becomes a playboy. Jan and husband Phillip try to get pregnant. Greg, following Bobby's car wreck, considers going back to medical school and changing his specialty to orthopedics.
2	"Here We Grow Again"	Bruce Bilson	S. Schwartz & L. Schwartz	February 9, 1990	1-2
The Bradys rally around Bobby in his efforts to recover. The arrival of Bobby's old college girlfriend Tracy Wagner helps to lift his spirits. Unable to conceive a child of their own, Jan and Phillip adopt an Asian girl named Patty. Cindy is a morning radio DJ and begins dating her boss. Greg decides to stay with obstetrics after Tracy's pregnant sister goes into labor at Bobby's and Tracy's wedding, which is officiated by the same minister who performed Mike's and Carol's wedding.
3	"A Moving Experience"	Bob Sweeney	S. Schwartz & L. Schwartz	February 16, 1990	1-3
The Bradys are notified that the Department of Transportation will tear down their house to make room for a new freeway and, in a fight to save their home, they have it moved to a new location. Cindy's relationship with her boss intensifies. Gene and Mike decide to run for city council.
4	"Hat in the Ring"	Nancy Malone	S. Schwartz & L. Schwartz	February 23, 1990	1-4
Mike declares his candidacy for city council with the help of Peter and Wally as his campaign managers, but his political future is nearly threatened by a blackmail attempt by his opponent's campaign manager (Herb Edelman). In the end, Mike wins the election.
5	"Bottom's Up"	Bruce Bilson	Sandra Kay Siegel	March 2, 1990	1-5
With Carol doing more things for Jessica and Mickey, Wally working overtime with Mike, Cindy debating about a job promotion, Jan busy managing the family's architectural firm and Peter, Bobby and Greg working on a new trauma center, Marcia feels left out and unneeded and turns to alcohol for escape.
6	"The Party Girls"	Dick Martin	Ed Scharlach	March 9, 1990	1-6
Marcia, Nora and Tracy open their own catering business called The Party Girls, and their first assignment is a mistakenly Austrian-themed event at the Brady residence for an ambassador who is actually from Australia (Gerard Maguire). Meanwhile, Greg and Peter are constantly feuding when their schedules keep conflicting. Greg saves Peter from choking and the brothers make peace.

Notes

- "Start Your Engines" and "Here We Grow Again" were later repackaged as a two-hour movie titled The Brady 500.
- "A Moving Experience" and "Hat in the Ring" were later repackaged as a two-hour movie titled The Bradys on the Move.
- "Bottom's Up" and "The Party Girls" were later repackaged as a two-hour movie titled Big Kids, Big Problems.

== Home media ==
In April 2007, the two-hour pilot episode, The Brady 500 (a.k.a. "Start Your Engines/Here We Grow Again"), was released as a bonus feature on The Brady Bunch: The Complete Series 21-disc DVD box set issued by CBS Home Entertainment and Paramount Home Entertainment.

In 2019, the series was released on DVD as a part of The Brady-est Brady Bunch TV & Movie Collection.
