= Dragging the Classics: The Brady Bunch =

2021 television special

- Country of origin: United States
- Original language: English

Original release
- Network: Paramount+
- Release: June 30, 2021

Dragging the Classics: The Brady Bunch is a television special that was released on the American streaming service Paramount+ on June 30, 2021. The special sees drag performers from RuPaul's Drag Race and original cast members from The Brady Bunch recreating the latter show's second season episode "Will the Real Jan Brady Please Stand Up?".

== Cast ==
- Bianca Del Rio as Carol Brady
- Shea Couleé as Marcia Brady
- Kylie Sonique Love as Jan Brady
- Kandy Muse as Cindy Brady
- Barry Williams as Mike Brady
- BenDeLaCreme as Greg Brady
- Christopher Knight as Peter Brady
- Mike Lookinland as Bobby Brady
- Nina West as Alice
- RuPaul as the Wig Attendant
- Michelle Visage as Helen
- Eve Plumb as Lucy
- Susan Olsen as Margie

== Production and release ==
The special Dragging the Classics: The Brady Bunch was released on the American streaming service Paramount+ on June 30, 2021. Paramount+ airs RuPaul's Drag Race All Stars, a spin-off of the American reality competition television series RuPaul's Drag Race (2009). The special features contestants from Drag Race and All Stars, as well as cast members from the American sitcom The Brady Bunch (1969–1974), recreating the latter show's second season episode "Will the Real Jan Brady Please Stand Up?". Drag Race contestants BenDeLaCreme, Bianca Del Rio, Kandy Muse, Kylie Sonique Love, Nina West, and Shea Couleé portrayed Greg Brady, Carol Brady, Cindy Brady, Jan Brady, Alice, and Marcia Brady, respectively. Drag Race host RuPaul also makes a cameo appearance. Christopher Knight and Mike Lookinland reprised their roles as Peter Brady and Bobby Brady, respectively. Susan Olsen, who originally played Cindy Brady, portrayed the minor character Margie. Eve Plumb, who played Jan Brady on the series, portrayed the minor character Lucy for the special. Barry Williams, who played Greg Brady on The Brady Bunch, portrayed the Mike Brady character originally played by Robert Reed.

Green screen was used during filming.

Described as a crossover, the special was released in conjunction with Pride.
