= Chris Kreski =

American author and screenwriter

- Born: July 31, 1962; U.S.
- Died: May 9, 2005 (aged 42); Branford, Connecticut, U.S.
- Occupations: Biographer; Screenwriter

Christopher Raymond Kreski (July 31, 1962 – May 9, 2005) was an American writer, biographer and screenwriter.

== Early life and education ==
Kreski graduated in 1980, from Butler High School and was inducted into the school's hall of fame in 2018. He graduated with a BFA from New York University in 1984.

== Writing ==
In 1989, during his tenure as the head writer for Remote Control, Kreski met actor Barry Williams, who was one of three celebrity contestants during a "Brady Day" episode. When Williams said that he'd thought about writing a biography, Kreski struck up a partnership. The resulting book, Growing Up Brady: I Was A Teenage Greg sold more than 300,000 copies and established Kreski as an "as told to" celebrity writer. Kreski went on to co-write three best-selling autobiographies with William Shatner, and one with baseball pitcher David Wells.

=== MTV ===
Kreski was associated with MTV Networks for over 15 years, and was a writer and consultant for many of its high-profile series and specials, such as Remote Control, Beavis and Butt-Head, Celebrity Deathmatch, and the channel's annual movie and video music awards shows. He was responsible for many of the channel's distinctive in-house promotional spots during the early 1990s. Kreski was also a head writer of The Daily Show and The Martin Short Show.

=== Bibliography ===
- Williams, Barry and Kreski, Chris (1992) Growing Up Brady
- Shatner, William and Kreski, Chris (1993) Star Trek Memories
- Shatner, William and Kreski, Chris (1994) Star Trek Movie Memories
- Kreski, Chris (1998) Life Lessons from Xena, Warrior Princess
- Shatner, William and Kreski, Chris (1999) Get A Life!
- Wells, David and Kreski, Chris (2004) Perfect I'm Not

== Professional wrestling ==
Following the departures of Vince Russo and Ed Ferrara, Kreski became the head writer of the World Wrestling Federation (WWF, now WWE) in 1999 during the second half of the Attitude Era. He is widely credited with writing captivating and layered storylines, and was the helm of WWF creative in some of its all-time peak years of both ratings and profitability. Kreski was replaced as head writer by Stephanie McMahon following the No Mercy PPV event in October 2000, but remained on the creative team until 2002, when he left to pursue other opportunities.

== Death ==
Kreski died of lung and brain cancer on May 9, 2005.
