= A Very Brady Renovation =

Television show on HGTV

- Starring: Barry Williams; Maureen McCormick; Christopher Knight; Eve Plumb; Mike Lookinland; Susan Olsen
- Country of origin: United States
- Original language: English
- No. of seasons: 1
- No. of episodes: 7

Production
- Executive producers: Brian Lando; Francesco Giuseppe Pace; Bob Kirsh; Dean Ollins
- Producer: Lloyd Schwartz

Original release
- Network: HGTV
- Release: September 9 – October 14, 2019; December 16, 2019 (holiday special)

A Very Brady Renovation is an American reality television miniseries airing on HGTV. It showcases the renovation of the Studio City, California house that was used for many of the exterior shots in the 1969–1974 American sitcom The Brady Bunch. The house was purchased by HGTV in 2018 for $3.5 million. The renovation was completed in May 2019 and the miniseries premiered on September 9, with the surviving Brady Bunch cast appearing in the program.

== Cast ==
The Brady Bunch original cast members (appearing as themselves on this series)

- Barry Williams (Greg)
- Maureen McCormick (Marcia)
- Christopher Knight (Peter)
- Eve Plumb (Jan)
- Mike Lookinland (Bobby)
- Susan Olsen (Cindy)

Renovators

- Jonathan & Drew Scott (Property Brothers)
- Mina Starsiak & Karen E. Laine (Good Bones)
- Leanne & Steve Ford (Restored by the Fords)
- Jasmine Roth (Hidden Potential)
- Lara Spencer (Flea Market Flip)

== Episodes ==
No. overall	No. in season	Title	Original release date	U.S. viewers (millions)
1	1	"Honey, We're Home"	September 9, 2019	3.36
The Brady Bunch actors have an emotional reunion at their famous TV home before beginning demolition; Jonathan and Drew Scott team up with Maureen McCormick and Susan Olsen to renovate the heart of the home; extended episode.
2	2	"Here's the Second Story"	September 16, 2019	2.02
Jasmine Roth and Barry Williams create Mike Brady's den out of three spaces in the original house; Mina Starsiak Hawk and Karen E Laine work with Susan Olsen and Mike Lookinland on the Jack and Jill bathroom and kids' rooms.
3	3	"Orange You Glad It's Avocado?"	September 23, 2019	1.53
Steve and Leanne Ford team up with Christopher Knight and Eve Plumb to build out the kitchen and family room on the first floor; the Brady backyard is complete with artificial turf; the team furnishes Alice's bedroom.
4	4	"A Sunshine Day on Clinton Way"	September 30, 2019	1.66
Barry Williams joins Lara Spencer and Jasmine Roth to recreate his attic bedroom, but in a very unexpected part of the house. Also, Jasmine pulls double duty working on Mike and Carol Brady's master bedroom with Mike Lookinland.
5	5	"Behind the Build: Scenes We Fern-ally Get to Show You"	October 7, 2019	0.963
A look at unseen footage and memorable reveals for the front exterior, the heart of the home and Alice's bedroom and bathroom.
6	6	"Behind the Build: We're Gonna Keep On, Keep On Showing You More"	October 14, 2019	0.784
The series concludes with a look at unseen moments and unforgettable reveals of the master suite, family room and Mike's den; a celebrity surprise.
7	7	"Holiday Edition"	December 16, 2019	0.758
The six Brady Bunch cast members gather with Jasmine Roth and Ree Drummond (The Pioneer Woman) to celebrate Christmas, creating 1970s-inspired treats and festive decorations at the Brady house.

== Ratings ==
HGTV announced that over 28 million total viewers had watched the series over the four-week period.

Viewership and ratings per episode of A Very Brady Renovation
No.	Title	Air date	Viewers (millions)	DVR viewers (millions)	Total viewers (millions)
1	"Honey, We're Home"	September 9, 2019	3.36	4.74	8.10
2	"Here's the Second Story"	September 16, 2019	2.02	TBD	TBD
3	"Orange You Glad It's Avocado?"	September 23, 2019	1.53	TBD	TBD
4	"A Sunshine Day on Clinton Way"	September 30, 2019	1.66	TBD	TBD
5	"Behind the Build: Scenes We Fern-ally Get to Show You"	October 7, 2019	.963	TBD	TBD
6	"Behind the Build: We're Gonna Keep On, Keep On Showing You More"	October 14, 2019	.784	TBD	TBD
7	"A Very Brady Renovation: Holiday Edition"	December 16, 2019	TBD	TBD	TBD

== Awards and nominations ==
Year	Award	Category	Nominee	Result	Ref.
2020	Primetime Emmy Awards	Outstanding Structured Reality Program	Brian Lando, Francesco Giuseppe Pace, Bob Kirsh, Dean Ollins, Kelsey McCallister and Christina Hilbig	Nominated	

== After the series ==
The home and many of its contents went up for sale in May 2023 at an asking price of $5.5 million. Although the house was purchased for $3.5 million and received $1.9 million worth of renovations, the house was then sold for $3.2 million in September 2023 to Tina Trahan, wife of HBO executive Chris Albrecht and a longtime fan of The Brady Bunch. She announced that the house would stay as is, and be used for charity events and fundraisers. On March 4, 2026, the house was designated a Los Angeles Historic-Cultural Monument by the Los Angeles City Council. In summer 2026, tours at the house became available.
