= Ann B. Davis =

American actress (1926–2014)

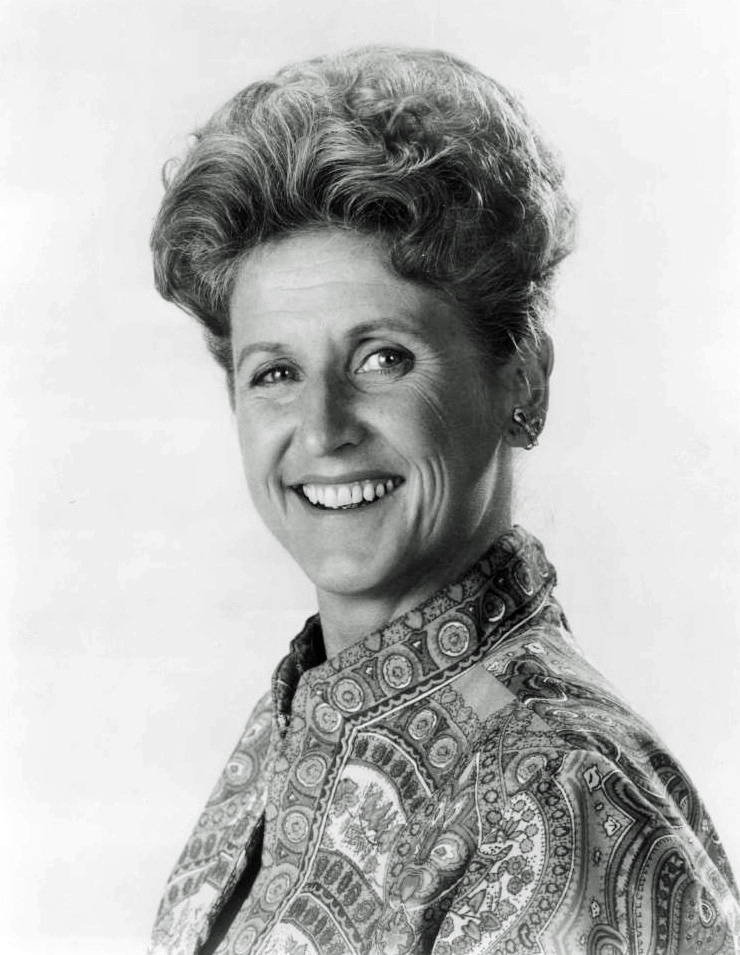
- Davis in 1973
- Born: Ann Bradford Davis; May 3, 1926; Schenectady, New York, U.S.
- Died: June 1, 2014 (aged 88); San Antonio, Texas, U.S.
- Education: University of Michigan
- Occupation: Actress
- Years active: 1953–1997
- Known for: The Bob Cummings Show; The Brady Bunch; A Very Brady Christmas
- Awards: Primetime Emmy Award for Outstanding Supporting Actress in a Comedy Series; Hollywood Walk of Fame

Ann Bradford Davis (May 3, 1926 – June 1, 2014) was an American actress. She achieved prominence for her role in the NBC situation comedy The Bob Cummings Show (1955–1959), for which she twice won the Primetime Emmy Award for Outstanding Supporting Actress in a Comedy Series, but she was best known for playing the part of Alice Nelson, the housekeeper in ABC's The Brady Bunch (1969–1974).

== Early life ==
Davis was born in Schenectady, New York, to Marguerite (née Stott) and Cassius Miles Davis. She had an identical twin, Harriet, and an older sister and brother, Elizabeth (1917–1974) and Evans (1921–2005). When she was three, she and her family moved to Erie in northwestern Pennsylvania. She graduated from Strong Vincent High School and later from the University of Michigan in Ann Arbor. She originally enrolled as a pre-medical major, but she changed her mind and went into drama after seeing her brother's performance of Oklahoma! Davis graduated in 1948 with a degree in drama and speech.

== Career ==
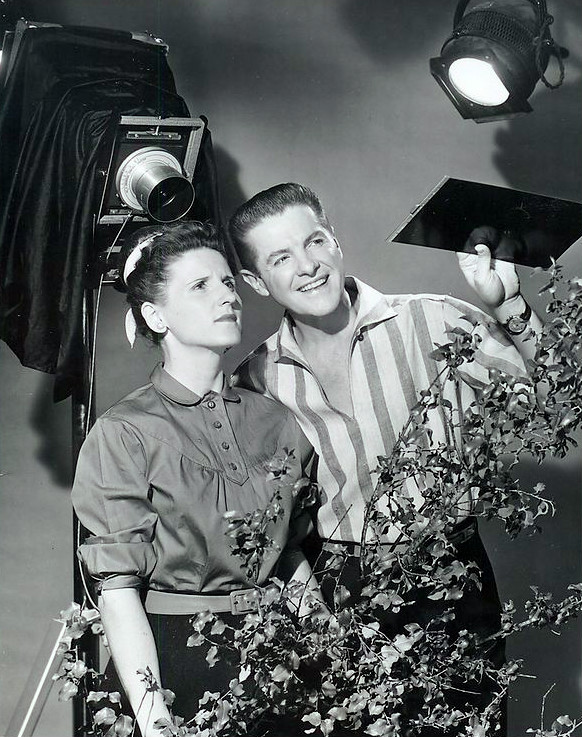
Davis with Bob Cummings on The Bob Cummings Show, 1958

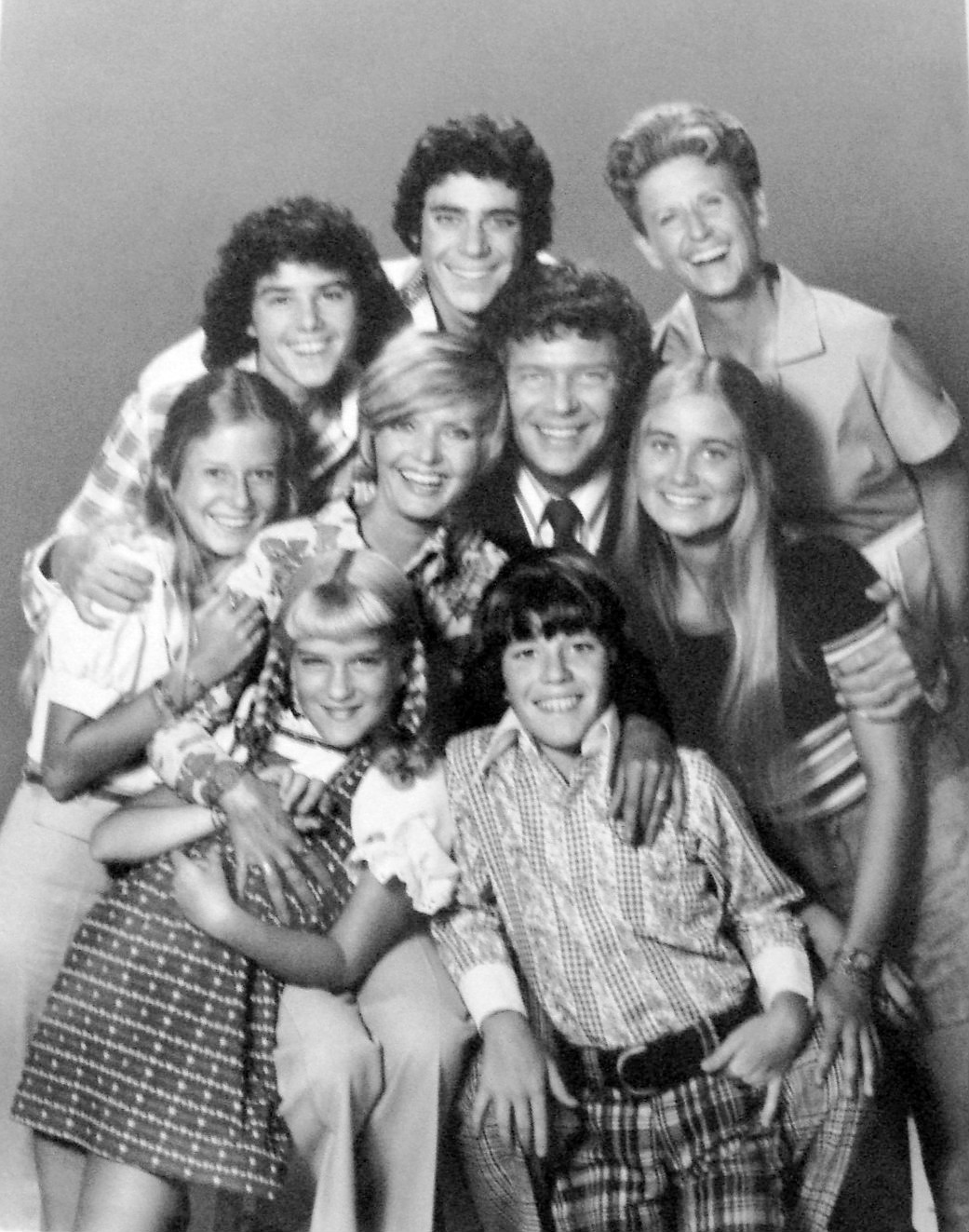
Cast photo of The Brady Bunch. Back (L-R): Christopher Knight (Peter), Barry Williams (Greg), Ann B. Davis (Alice). Second row (L-R): Eve Plumb (Jan), Florence Henderson (Carol), Robert Reed (Mike), Maureen McCormick (Marcia). Front (L-R): Susan Olsen (Cindy), Mike Lookinland (Bobby).

In the 1953–1954 season, Davis appeared as a musical judge on ABC's Jukebox Jury.

Davis's first television success was as Charmaine "Schultzy" Schultz in The Bob Cummings Show, 1955–1959. She auditioned for the role because her friend's boyfriend was a casting director and recommended her for the part. She won the Primetime Emmy Award for Outstanding Supporting Actress in a Comedy Series twice out of four nominations for this role.

She appeared on January 23, 1958, as a guest star on The Ford Show, Starring Tennessee Ernie Ford. On February 9, 1960, Davis received a star on the Hollywood Walk of Fame. In this period, Davis also focused on theater. As early as 1958, she appeared in a national touring company of the Thornton Wilder play The Matchmaker, co-starring with her Bob Cummings Show castmate, Lyle Talbot, who played Bob's Air Force buddy, and on June 27, 1960 she replaced Carol Burnett in the starring role of Princess Winnifred in the Broadway production of the musical Once Upon a Mattress. Davis only played the role for a week before the show closed on July 2.

In May 1964, she appeared in the stage production of Bus Stop at the Yonkers Playhouse. Jayne Mansfield played the lead character Cherie, while Davis played the character of Grace, owner of the diner. The play had a three-week engagement that ended on June 14.

In the 1965–1966 television season, Davis appeared as Miss Wilson, a physical education teacher at a private girls' academy in John Forsythe's single-season NBC sitcom, The John Forsythe Show.

For a period in the 1960s and 1970s, Davis was known for her appearances in television commercials for the Ford Motor Company, particularly for the midsized Ford Fairlane models. Davis was also featured in commercials for Minute Rice in Canada until the mid-1980s. During this period, she also performed as a comedian; before Sherwood Schwartz could cast her in The Brady Bunch, Paramount Studios had to buy her out of a multiweek booking in Seattle.

From 1969 to 1974, Davis played housekeeper Alice Nelson in The Brady Bunch television series. She later returned to take part in various Brady Bunch television movies, including The Brady Girls Get Married (1981) and A Very Brady Christmas (1988). She also reprised her role as Alice Nelson in two short-lived Brady Bunch spin-off television series: The Brady Brides (1981), which ran for 10 episodes, and The Bradys (1990), which lasted only six episodes. She also made a cameo appearance as a truck driver named "Schultzy", a reference to her days on The Bob Cummings Show, in The Brady Bunch Movie in 1995. In 1994, Davis published a cookbook, Alice's Brady Bunch Cookbook, with Brady Bunch-inspired recipes. The book also includes recipes from cast members.

In the early 1990s, Davis returned to theater. She performed in a production of Arsenic and Old Lace, and both the Broadway production and a world tour of Crazy for You.

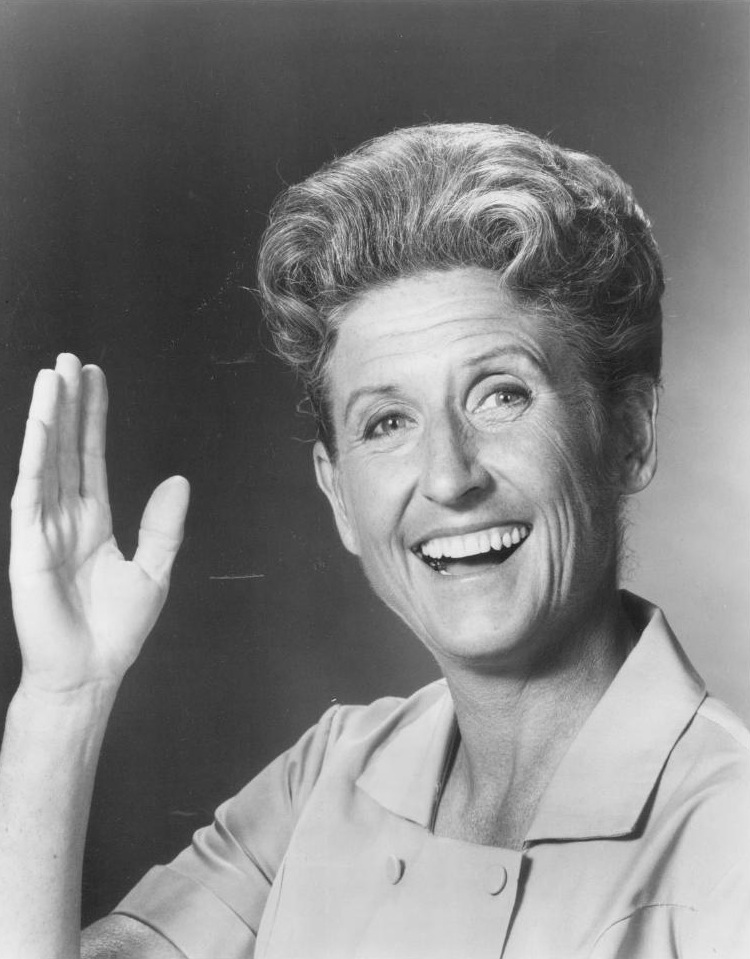
Davis' most famous role was as housekeeper Alice Nelson on the '70s sitcom The Brady Bunch.

Davis never completely retired from acting; in her later years, she was the celebrity spokeswoman in several Shake 'n Bake commercials and later appeared in several disposable mop commercials for Swiffer. She also appeared in a number of Brady Bunch reunion projects, most recently TV Land's The Brady Bunch 35th Anniversary Reunion Special: Still Brady After All These Years. On April 22, 2007, The Brady Bunch was awarded the TV Land Pop Culture Award on the fifth annual TV Land Awards. Davis and other cast members accepted the award, and she received a standing ovation.

== Personal life ==
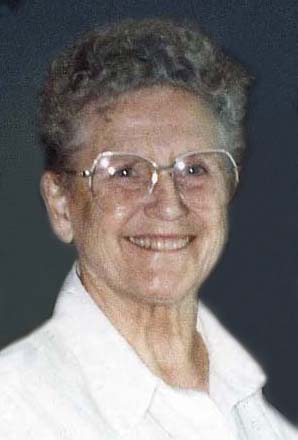
Davis in November 2007

In 1976, Davis sold her home in Los Angeles to move to Denver, Colorado, where she joined an Episcopal community led by Bishop William C. Frey. The community later relocated to Ambridge in Beaver County in far western Pennsylvania after Frey became dean of the seminary Trinity School for Ministry. Davis had long been a volunteer for the Episcopal Church, working at the General Convention, attending services at churches around the country.

== Death ==
Davis died at the age of 88 on June 1, 2014, at a hospital in San Antonio, Texas. Earlier in the day, she had sustained a subdural hematoma from a fall in her bathroom in her San Antonio residence, in which she lived with Bishop Frey and his wife, Barbara. Sources close to Davis say that she was in excellent health for her age and that her death was a complete shock. She was cremated and interred in the Saint Helena's Columbarium and Memorial Gardens in Boerne, Texas.

== Works ==
=== Film ===
Year	Title	Role	Notes
1955	A Man Called Peter	Ruby Coleman	Uncredited
1956	The Best Things in Life Are Free	Hattie Stewart	Uncredited
1960	Pepe	Ann B. "Schultzy" Davis	
1961	All Hands on Deck	Nobby	
1961	Lover Come Back	Millie	
1994	Naked Gun 33 1/3: The Final Insult	Alice Nelson	Credited as playing herself
1995	The Brady Bunch Movie	Trucker (Shultzy)	

=== Television ===
Year	Title	Role	Notes
1953–1953	Jukebox Jury	Herself/Judge	Musical series
1956	Matinee Theater	Peg Miller	Episode: "Belong to Me"
1956	Lux Video Theatre	Miss Killicat	Episode: "The Wayward Saint"
1955–1959	The Bob Cummings Show	Charmaine "Schultzy" Schultz	153 episodes
1960	Wagon Train	Mrs. Foster	Episode: "The Countess Baranof Story"
1962	The New Breed	Elizabeth MacBaine	Episode: "Wherefore Art Thou, Romeo?"
1962	Here's Hollywood	Herself	Celebrity interview program
1963	McKeever and the Colonel	Sgt. Gruber	Episode: "Too Many Sergeants"
1963	The Keefe Brasselle Show	Herself	3 appearances on summer replacement series for The Garry Moore Show
1964	Bob Hope Presents the Chrysler Theatre	Matha	Episode: "Wake Up, Darling"
1965–1966	The John Forsythe Show	Miss Wilson	29 episodes
1966	The Pruitts of Southampton	Mrs. Derwin	Episode: "Phyllis Takes a Letter"
1968	Insight	Pat	Episode: "The Late Great God"
1970/1973	Love, American Style		2 episodes
1971	Big Fish, Little Fish	Hilda Rose	Movie
1973	The World of Sid & Marty Krofft at the Hollywood Bowl	Audience member	Uncredited
1969–1974	The Brady Bunch	Alice Nelson / Cousin Emma	117 episodes
1974	Only with Married Men	Mola	Movie; uncredited
1976–1977	The Brady Bunch Hour	Alice Nelson	9 episodes
1980	The Love Boat	Agnes	Episode: "Invisible Maniac/September Song/Peekaboo"
1981	The Brady Girls Get Married	Alice Nelson	Movie
1981	The Brady Brides	Alice Nelson	6 episodes
1983	Rosie	Jill Po	Episode: "Waitresses in Line"
1988	A Very Brady Christmas	Alice Nelson	Movie
1989	Day by Day	Alice Nelson	Episode: "A Very Brady Episode"
1990	The Bradys	Alice Nelson	4 episodes
1991	Hi Honey, I'm Home!	Episode: "SRP"	
1993	Bradymania: A Very Brady Special	Herself	TV special
1997	Something So Right	Maxine	Episode: "Something About Inter-Ex-Spousal Relations"
2004	The Brady Bunch 35th Anniversary Reunion Special	Herself	TV special

=== Stage ===
Year	Title	Role	Venue	Notes
1960	Once Upon a Mattress	Princess Winnifred		
1972–1973	No, No, Nanette			
1992–1996	Crazy for You	Mother		
1996	Arsenic and Old Lace	Abby Brewster		

== Awards and nominations ==
Davis received four Primetime Emmy Award nominations, resulting in two awards, for her portrayal of Charmaine "Schultzy" Schultz on The Bob Cummings Show.

Television Season	Award	Category	Television Program	Result	Notes
1955–1956	Emmy Award	Best Actress in a Supporting Role	The Bob Cummings Show (Episode: "Schultzy's Dream World")	Nominated	Lost to Nanette Fabray (Caesar's Hour)
1956–1957	Emmy Award	Best Supporting Performance by an Actress	The Bob Cummings Show	Nominated	Lost to Pat Carroll (Caesar's Hour)
1957–1958	Emmy Award	Best Continuing Supporting Performance by an Actress in a Dramatic or Comedy Series	The Bob Cummings Show	Won	
1958–1959	Emmy Award	Best Supporting Actress (Continuing Character) in a Comedy Series	The Bob Cummings Show	Won	

On February 9, 1960, Davis also received a star on the Hollywood Walk of Fame at 7048 Hollywood Boulevard. She also received TV Land Awards in 2004, 2006, and 2007 for her portrayal of Alice Nelson, the housekeeper on The Brady Bunch.
