= Barry Williams (actor) =

American actor (born 1954)

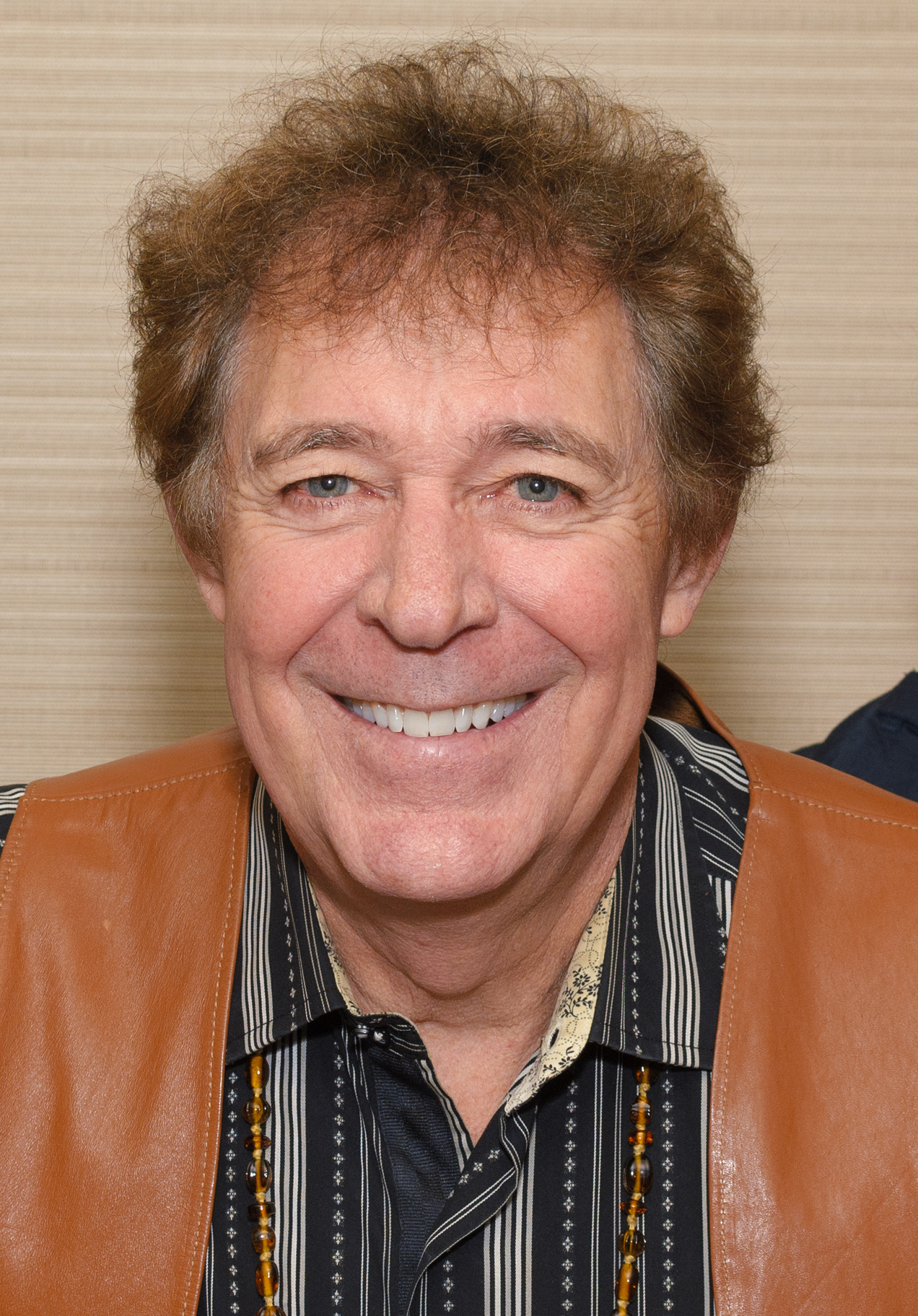
- Williams at the Chiller Theatre Expo in 2017
- Born: Barry William Blenkhorn; September 30, 1954 (age 72); Santa Monica, California, U.S.
- Occupations: Actor; television personality
- Years active: 1967–present
- Known for: The Brady Bunch; The Brady Kids; A Very Brady Christmas; The Bradys; Growing Up Brady; The Masked Singer; Dancing with the Stars
- Spouses: Diane Martin (m. 1990; div. 1992) Eila Mary Matt (m. 1999; div. 2005) Tina Mahina (m. 2017)
- Children: 2

Barry William Blenkhorn (born September 30, 1954), better known by his stage name Barry Williams, is an American actor. He is known for his role as the eldest of the Brady sons, Greg Brady, on the ABC television series The Brady Bunch (1969–1974), a role he reprised in several sequels and spin-offs including the animated series The Brady Kids (1972–1973), the variety series The Brady Bunch Hour (1976–1977) and the television films The Brady Girls Get Married (1981) and A Very Brady Christmas (1988) and the reality television series A Very Brady Renovation (2019).

He made his Broadway debut in the musical Romance/Romance in 1988. He acted in the films Wild in the Streets (1968) and The Brady Bunch Movie (1995). Williams acted in shows such as Marcus Welby, M.D.; Mission: Impossible; Murder, She Wrote; Full House; That '70s Show; and Scrubs. In 2022, he appeared on The Masked Singer, and appeared on season 32 of the ABC reality competition series Dancing with the Stars in 2023.

== Early life ==
Barry William Blenkhorn, the youngest of three boys, was born on September 30, 1954 in Santa Monica, California, to Doris May Moore and Canadian-born Frank Millar Blenkhorn, of English, Scottish, and German ancestry. Barry and siblings Craig and Scott Blenkhorn grew up in Pacific Palisades, California, where actor Peter Graves was a neighbor.

== Career ==
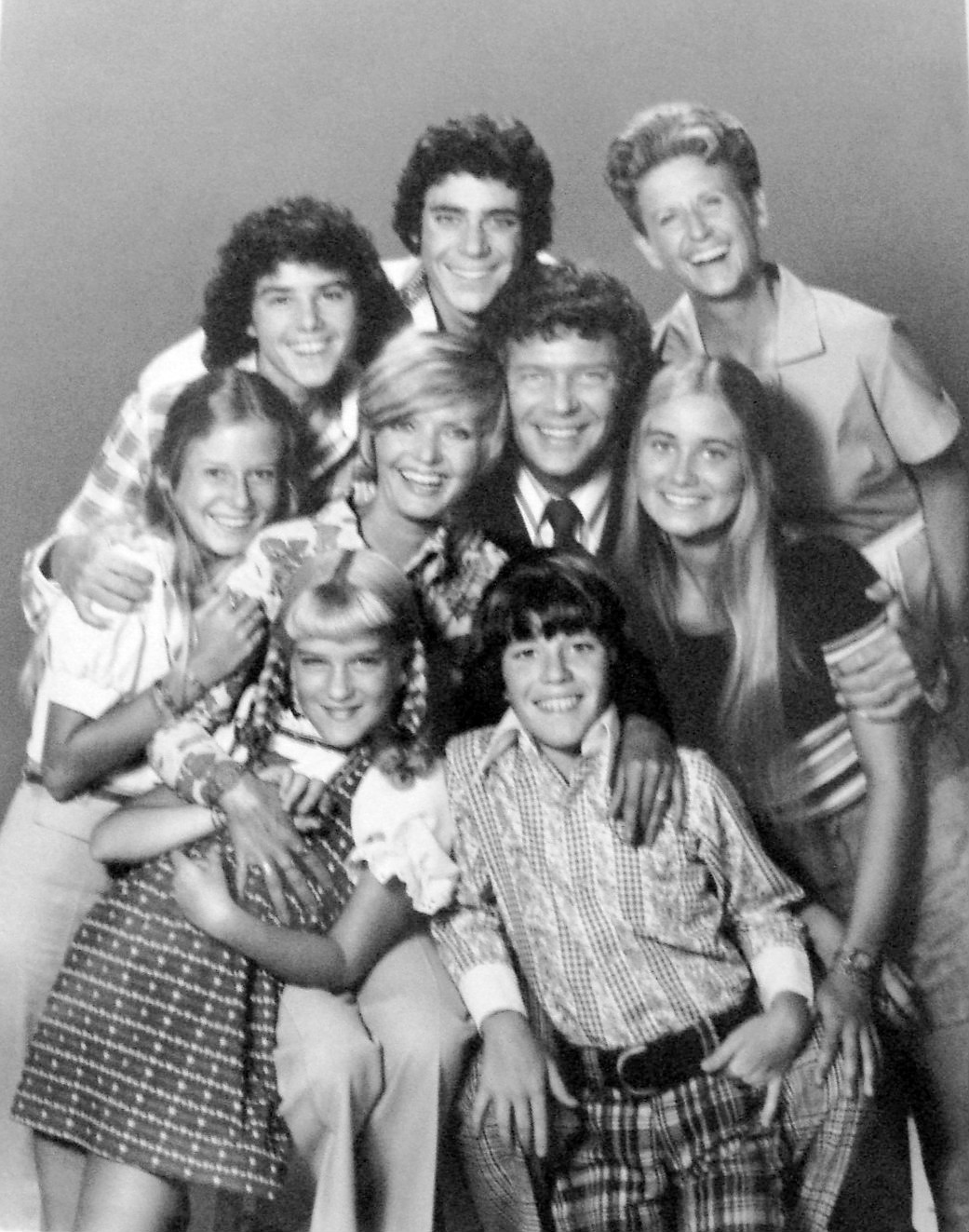
Cast photo from The Brady Bunch. Back (L-R): Christopher Knight (Peter), Barry Williams (Greg), Ann B. Davis (Alice). Second row (L-R): Eve Plumb (Jan), Florence Henderson (Carol), Robert Reed (Mike), Maureen McCormick (Marcia). Front (L-R): Susan Olsen (Cindy), Mike Lookinland (Bobby).

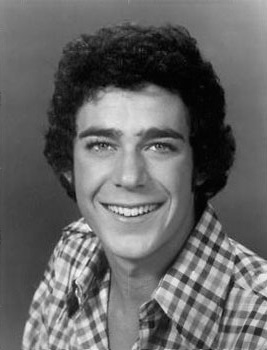
Williams's most famous role was as oldest son Greg Brady on the 1970s sitcom The Brady Bunch.

Williams decided as a child that he wanted to be an actor, and in 1967 he made his television debut in a Christmas episode of Dragnet 1967. Williams continued to be cast in guest roles on other TV series including Adam-12; The Invaders; That Girl; Mission: Impossible; The Mod Squad; Here Come the Brides; Gomer Pyle, U.S.M.C.; Marcus Welby, M.D.; and Bartleby, the Scrivener before being cast in 1969 as eldest son Greg Brady on The Brady Bunch. He was also the voice of Greg in the first season of the ABC Saturday morning cartoon The Brady Kids (1972–73).

Following The Brady Bunch's cancellation in 1974, Williams continued to appear in guest roles on television, and became involved in musical theater, touring with productions such as Grease, The Sound of Music, Pippin, and West Side Story.

In 1988, Williams appeared on Broadway in the musical Romance/Romance with Tony Award-nominee Alison Fraser. Williams took over the lead male role of "Alfred/Sam" when Scott Bakula left the production. Years later, Williams was able to capitalize on being typecast as Greg Brady. Amid a procession of appearances in TV and films that played up his famous teen role, he ended up landing a role that was a departure from the Brady image. He was tapped to play English con man Hannibal in 1984, who conspired with Holly Sutton Scorpio (Emma Samms) on the top-rated General Hospital.

Williams has appeared in various Brady Bunch reunions, including the variety series The Brady Bunch Hour (1976–77), the television film The Brady Girls Get Married (1981), the 1988 Christmas film, A Very Brady Christmas, and the drama series The Bradys (1990). In 1989, Williams was honored by the Young Artist Foundation with its Former Child Star "Lifetime Achievement" Award for his role as Greg Brady. He also had a cameo role as a record producer in the 1995 feature film The Brady Bunch Movie. His 1992 autobiography, Growing Up Brady: I Was A Teenage Greg, co-written with Chris Kreski, was a New York Times bestseller and was adapted into a 2000 television film titled Growing Up Brady starring Adam Brody as Williams. In 2000, Williams sang a parody of Eminem's "The Real Slim Shady" called "The Real Greg Brady"; the song was co-written by Williams, comedy writer and radio producer, David Brody of Z100 NY WHTZ, and Jay Gilbert of WEBN Radio in Cincinnati.

Other shows Williams has appeared in include Highway to Heaven; Murder, She Wrote; Full House; That 70s Show; and Scrubs. Williams appeared briefly as an audience member in the 2002 music video of Peter Gabriel's song, "The Barry Williams Show". The song is actually about a fictional Jerry Springer-like talk show host, not the actor; Gabriel later revealed that he did not know of the Brady Bunch star when he wrote the song.

Williams has made multiple appearances as a paid featured dancer at the World's Largest Disco in Buffalo, New York. Between 2001 and 2002, he played Manager Dean "The Machine" Strickland in 13 episodes of the sitcom, Hollywood 7, which featured the British pop group S Club 7. Williams played himself in the 2003 film Dickie Roberts: Former Child Star. In 2008, Williams appeared in Episode 6 of the VH1 series, Celebrity Rehab with Dr. Drew. Williams participated as a friend of one of the patients, Chyna, and explained to her during a group session how drinking had a negative impact on his own life and career.

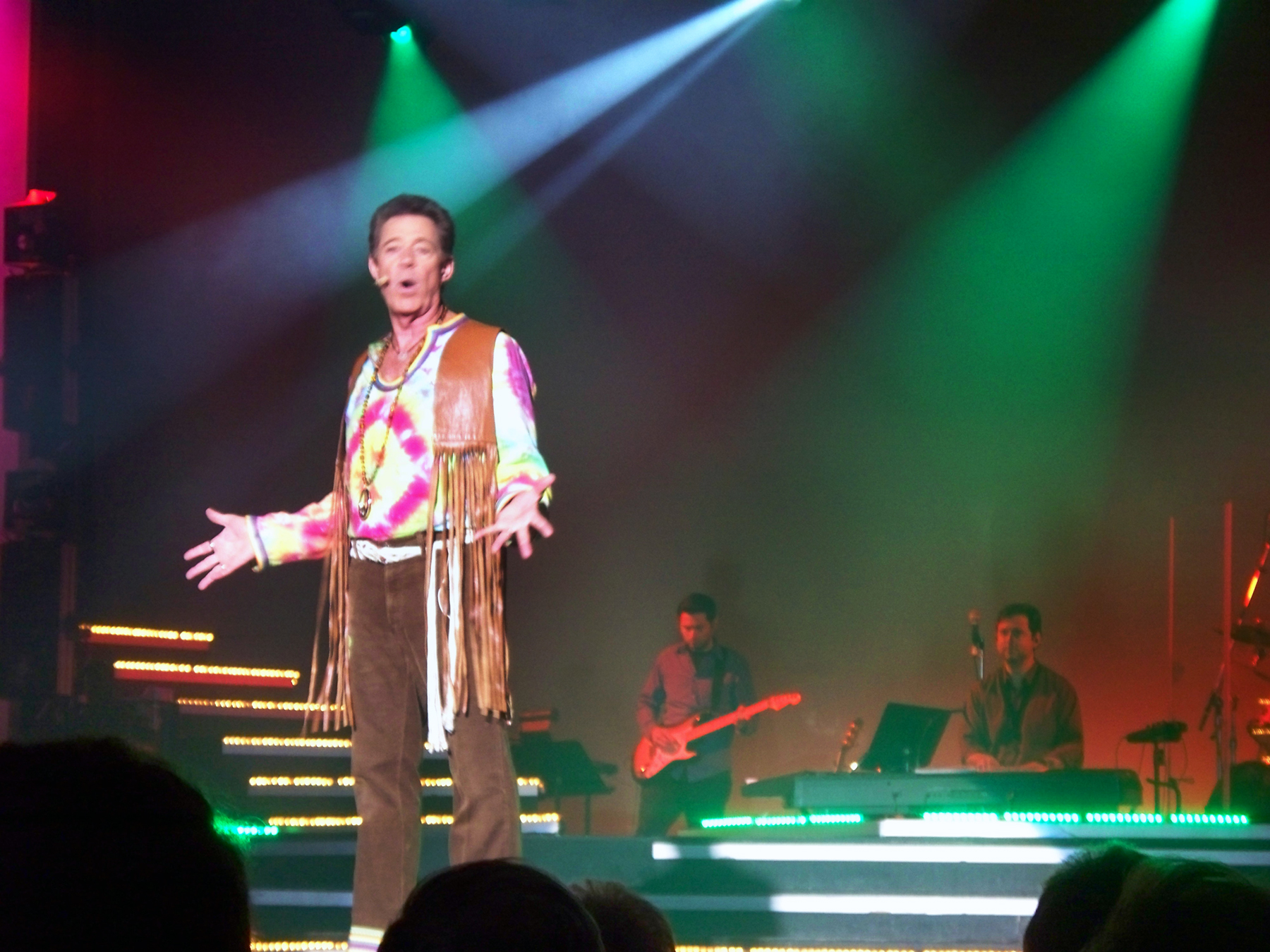
Williams performing in Branson, Missouri in October 2014

In January 2010, he took a role in The Asylum mockbuster, Mega Piranha, who played alongside the former teen pop singer Tiffany. With the death of Florence Henderson in 2016, Williams became the oldest living cast member of The Brady Bunch.

As of 2019, he makes Branson, Missouri, his home and tours with the musical group Barry Williams and the Traveliers. He also joined with the other Brady Bunch kids in the 2019 television series A Very Brady Renovation on HGTV. In 2021, Williams starred in the Lifetime Christmas film, Blending Christmas, alongside his Brady Bunch co-stars Christopher Knight, Mike Lookinland, Susan Olsen, and Robbie Rist.

In 2022, Williams, Knight, and Lookinland competed in season eight of The Masked Singer as "Mummies". They were eliminated on "TV Theme Night" alongside Daymond John as "Fortune Teller".

In 2023, Williams was announced to be competing on season 32 of Dancing with the Stars, partnering with Peta Murgatroyd.

In 2026, Williams was a cast member on the Australian version of I'm a Celebrity...Get Me Out of Here! season 12. He was the second celebrity to arrive, after New Zealand model and actress Rachel Hunter.

== Personal life ==
=== Marriage and family ===
With second wife Eila Mary Matt, he had a son named Brandon Eric Williams in January 2003. With ex-girlfriend Elizabeth Kennedy, he had a daughter named Samantha Rose Williams in April 2012.

=== Legal issue ===
In January 2001, Williams was fined $52,000 by Actors' Equity Association, the union representing stage actors, for starring as Captain Von Trapp in a non-union tour of The Sound of Music. According to Variety, the production was picketed in several cities. Williams responded by filing a complaint with the National Labor Relations Board, arguing that the fine was illegal because he had resigned from the union in September 2000 before the tour began. Equity alleged that Williams, who joined the union in 1974, was still a member when he began contract negotiations for the role.

Williams was reinstated by Actor's Equity as a member in good standing in 2005 after he unionized a non-Equity production of A Christmas Carol in late 2004.

== Filmography ==
=== Film ===
Year	Title	Role
1968	Wild in the Streets	Young Max Frost
1969	Bartleby	Ginger Nut
1974	Goodnight Jackie	Barry
1995	The Brady Bunch Movie	Music Producer
2004	Santa's Rockin'!	Himself
2010	Mega Piranha	Bob Grady
2018	Flea	Marsh Man

=== Television ===
Year	Title	Role	Notes
1967	Run for Your Life	Stanley	Episode: "The Company of Scoundrels"
1967	Dragnet	John Heffernan	Episode: "The Christmas Story"
1968	The Invaders	Paper Boy	Season 2 Episode 25: "The Pursued"
1968	The F.B.I.	Boy	Episode: "The Messenger"
1968	Lancer	Ben Price	Episode: "Blood Rock"
1968	That Girl	Autograph Seeker	Episode: "7 1/4"
1968	Gomer Pyle – USMC	Boy No. 1	Episode: "A Star Is Not Born"
1968	The Mod Squad	Newspaper Boy	Episode: "The Guru"
1969	Here Come the Brides	Peter	Episode: "A Kiss Just for So"
1969	It Takes a Thief	Herbie DuBois	Episode: "A Matter of Grey Matter"
1969	Adam-12	Johnny Grant	Episode: "Log 152: A Dead Cop Can't Help Anyone"
1969	Marcus Welby, M.D.	Pancho McGurney	Episode: "The Chemistry of Hope"
1969–1974	The Brady Bunch	Greg Brady	117 episodes
1970	Hastings Corner	Junior Fandango	TV film
1970	Mission: Impossible	King Victor	Episode: "Gitano"
1972	The ABC Saturday Superstar Movie	Greg Brady	Voice, episode: "The Brady Kids on Mysterious Island"
1972-73	The Brady Kids	Greg Brady	Voice, 17 episodes
1973	The World of Sid & Marty Krofft at the Hollywood Bowl	Greg Brady	TV film
1976	Police Woman	Steve Glass	Episode: "Generation of Evil"
1976–77	The Brady Bunch Hour	Greg Brady	9 episodes
1979	Greatest Heroes of the Bible	Jacob	Episode: "Jacob's Challenge"
1981	The Brady Girls Get Married	Greg Brady	TV film
1982	Three's Company	David Winthrop	Episode: "Up in the Air"
1984	General Hospital	Hannibal	TV series
1985	Highway to Heaven	Miki Winner	Episode: "A Song for Jason"
1986	Rocky Road	Wayne Kincaid	Episode: "The Wrong Mr. Right"
1987	Murder, She Wrote	Nate Findley	Episode: "Night of the Headless Horseman"
1988	A Very Brady Christmas	Dr. Greg Brady	TV film
1990	The Bradys	Dr. Greg Brady	6 episodes
1991	Kids Incorporated	Ana's Dad	Episode: "Breaking Up Is Hard to Do"
1993	Bradymania: A Very Brady Special	Himself	TV special
1994	Summertime Switch	Frederick Egan II	TV film
1994	Full House	Himself	Episode: "Making Out Is Hard to Do"
1997	Perversions of Science	Neighbor	Episode: "People's Choice"
2001	Hollywood 7	Dean Strickland	Main role
2004	The Brady Bunch 35th Anniversary Reunion Special	Himself	TV special
2006	According to Jim	Ben	Episode: "Sex Ed Fred"
2006	That '70s Show	Jeff	Episode: "We Will Rock You"
2009	Scrubs	Himself	Episode: "My Soul on Fire"
2010	Mega Piranha	Bob Grady	TV film
2011	A.N.T. Farm	Game Show Host	Episode: "America Needs TalANT"
2012	Bigfoot	Simon Quint	TV film
2014	Celebrity Wife Swap		
2017	The Loud House	Bumper Sr.	Voice, episode: "Future Tense"
2019	A Very Brady Renovation	Himself	7 episodes
2021	Dragging the Classics: The Brady Bunch	Mike Brady	Paramount+ TV special
2021	Blending Christmas	John	TV film
2022	The Masked Singer	Himself/Mummy	Season 8 contestant; Group costume with Christopher Knight and Mike Lookinland
2023	Dancing with the Stars	Himself/Contestant	Season 32
2026	I'm a Celebrity...Get Me Out of Here!	Himself/Contestant	Season 12, 10th Place

=== Theatre ===
Year	Title	Role	Venue	Ref.
1988	Romance/Romance	Alfred Von Wilmers / Sam	Helen Hayes Theatre, Broadway	

== Awards and nominations ==
Year	Association	Category	Project	Result	Ref.
1994	CableACE Award	Performance in a Comedy Special	1993 MTV Movie Awards	Nominated	
2003	TV Land Awards	Favorite Fashion - Male	The Brady Bunch	Nominated	
2004	TV Land Awards	Favorite Fashion - Male	The Brady Bunch	Nominated	
2005	TV Land Awards	Favorite Siblings	The Brady Bunch	Nominated	
2007	TV Land Awards	Pop Culture Award	The Brady Bunch	Won	

== Book ==
- Growing Up Brady: I Was A Teenage Greg (1992) - ISBN 9780060965884 (with Chris Kreski)
