= Mike Lookinland =

American former actor (born 1960)

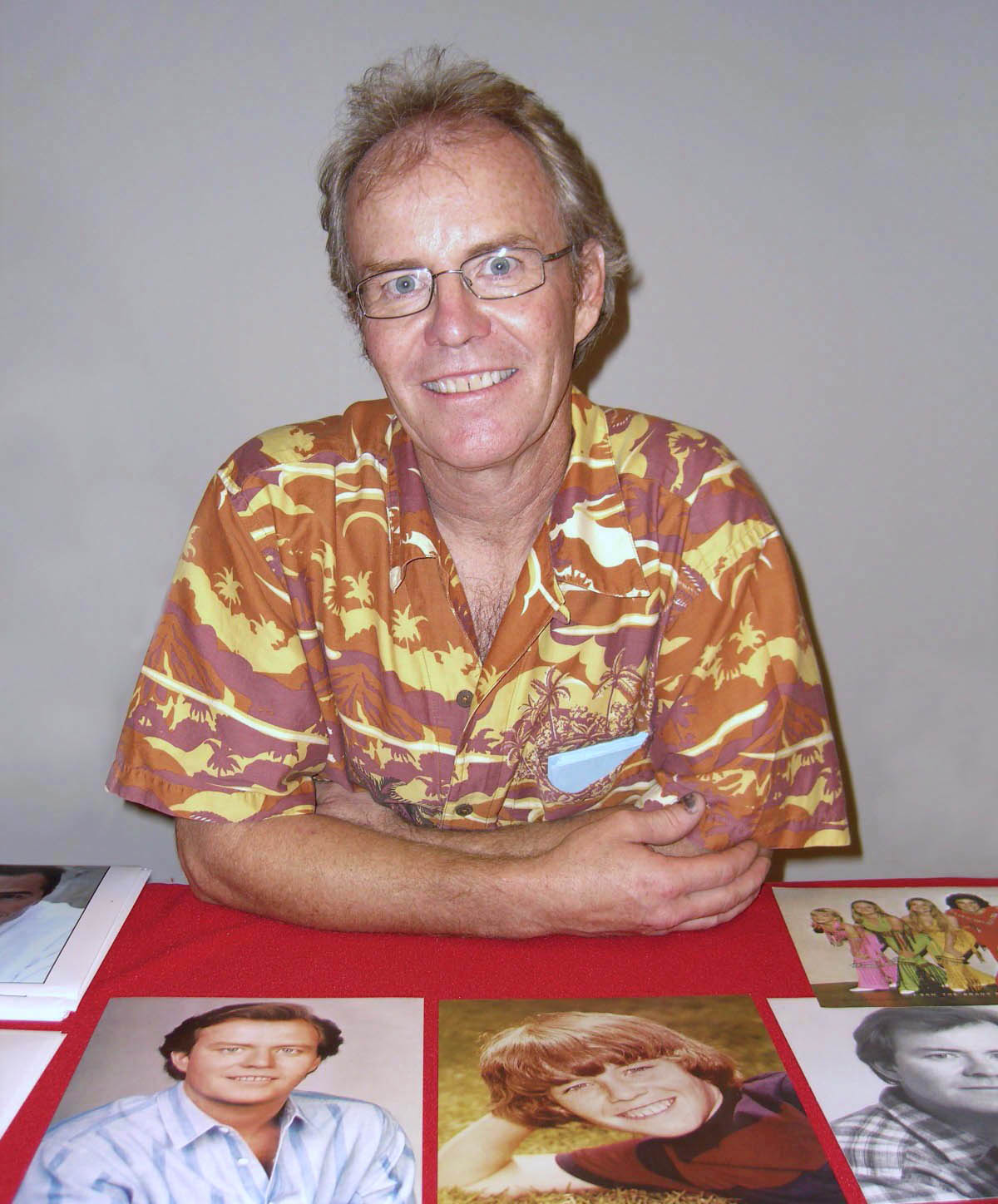
- Lookinland at the Big Apple Convention in Manhattan, 2010
- Born: Michael Paul Lookinland; December 19, 1960 (age 65); Mount Pleasant, Utah, US
- Education: Hollywood Professional School
- Occupation: Actor
- Years active: 1969–present
- Known for: Bobby Brady in The Brady Bunch franchise
- Spouse: Kelly Wermuth (m. 1987)
- Children: 2

Michael Paul Lookinland (born December 19, 1960) is an American actor, musician and cameraman. He is best known for his role as the youngest brother, Bobby Brady, on the ABC sitcom The Brady Bunch from 1969 to 1974, and all of its sequels and spinoffs.

== Early life ==
Lookinland was born in Mount Pleasant, Utah, to Paul and Karen Lookinland. His father was a principal at Stephen M. White Junior High, Carson, California. Paul and Karen resided in San Pedro, California, but were visiting family in nearby Spring City over Christmas break 1960 when Michael was born. His grandfather was an administrator at LDS Hospital in Salt Lake City. He has two siblings: sister Theresa and brother Todd, who starred in The Blue Bird with Elizabeth Taylor. Todd would later appear in a Brady Bunch episode that served as the pilot for a spin-off series, Kelly's Kids, about a husband and wife with three boys: one white, one black, and one Asian. The series was not bought.

Michael was raised as a member of the Church of Jesus Christ of Latter-day Saints. He began working as an actor at age seven. By age nine, he had appeared in numerous television commercials for such products as toys, Cheerios cereal, and Band-Aid bandages.

== Career ==
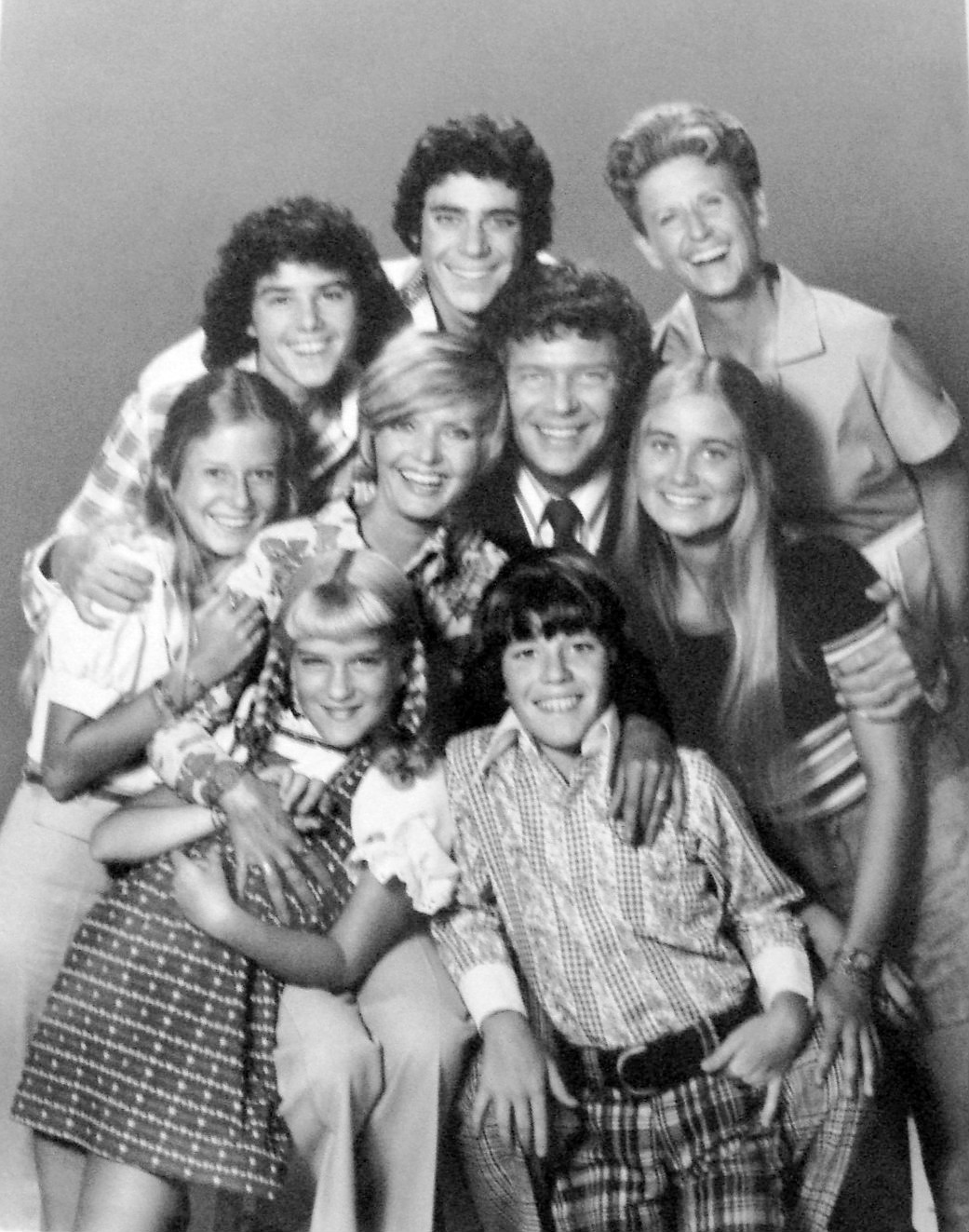
Cast photo of The Brady Bunch. Back (L-R): Christopher Knight (Peter), Barry Williams (Greg), Ann B. Davis (Alice). Second row (L-R): Eve Plumb (Jan), Florence Henderson (Carol), Robert Reed (Mike), Maureen McCormick (Marcia). Front (L-R): Susan Olsen (Cindy), Mike Lookinland (Bobby).

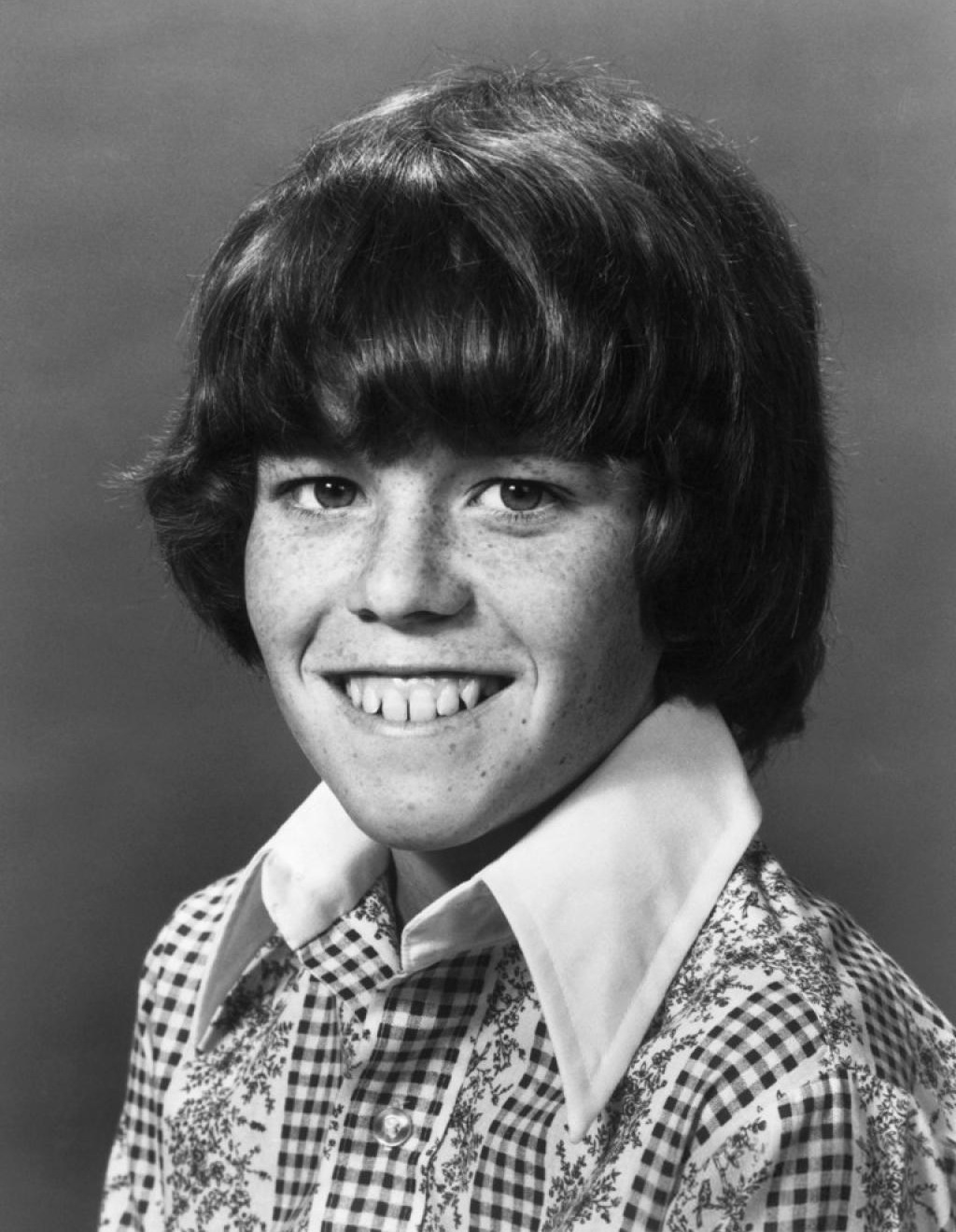
Lookinland's most famous role is as youngest son Bobby Brady on The Brady Bunch, 1973.

Lookinland was a TV-commercial actor before he was cast in The Brady Bunch, having done around thirty commercials. He had been offered two roles - Eddie on The Courtship of Eddie's Father and Bobby on The Brady Bunch; his parents chose the latter, feeling it would be healthier for him to be around other children closer to his age rather than an only child on an all-adult cast (the role of Eddie eventually went to Brandon Cruz). He has naturally sandy-colored, wavy hair. Because his hair color did not match TV-siblings Peter's or Greg's natural dark brown color, his was dyed dark brown and straightened. Occasionally, the lights on set were so hot that his dye would run down his face. During the last two seasons of The Brady Bunch, his natural hair color was allowed to show. He also voiced Bobby Brady in the ABC Saturday morning cartoon The Brady Kids from 1972 to 1974.

Within weeks after the final season of The Brady Bunch wrapped filming, he was cast in a supporting role alongside Jennifer Jones and Paul Newman in the 1974 disaster film The Towering Inferno. In 1975, he made a guest appearance on the 1970s TV show The Secrets of Isis with fellow child actors Tommy Norden and Buddy Foster.

Lookinland continued to reprise his role as Bobby Brady in the show's many sequels and spin-offs. In 1976, he was uninterested in participating in The Brady Bunch Hour, so he asked for double the offered salary in hopes his role would be recast. However, instead his request was accepted and resulted in increased salaries for all cast members. He also reprised his role in the 1981 TV film The Brady Girls Get Married, the 1988 Christmas special A Very Brady Christmas and again in the 1990 sequel series The Bradys, in which Bobby Brady was involved in a racing-car accident, which made him a wheelchair user throughout the series. Lookinland spent several years as a television camera operator and made an uncredited appearance in the 2000 film Growing Up Brady as a camera operator filming an episode of The Brady Bunch. He also joined with the other Brady Bunch cast in the 2019 television series A Very Brady Renovation on HGTV.

Having left show business, Lookinland operates a business that makes decorative concrete in Salt Lake City, Utah. In 2021, Lookinland returned to acting, starring in the Lifetime Christmas movie, Blending Christmas, alongside his Brady Bunch co-stars Barry Williams, Christopher Knight, Susan Olsen, and Robbie Rist.

In 2022, Lookinland, Knight, and Williams competed in season eight of The Masked Singer as "Mummies". They were eliminated on "TV Theme Night" alongside Daymond John as "Fortune Teller".

== Personal life ==
Lookinland graduated from Chadwick School in 1978, an independent school located on the Palos Verdes Peninsula in Los Angeles, California. During the Brady Bunch years, he also attended Hollywood Professional School alongside his TV siblings Maureen McCormick, Christopher Knight, and Susan Olsen. After graduating from high school, Lookinland wanted to leave Los Angeles, and moved to Salt Lake City, Utah, to attend the University of Utah, but dropped out in order to pursue a career as a production assistant and camera operator.

He wed on May 1, 1987, Kelly Wermuth (b. 1962), an occasional actress. Together, they have two children, sons Scott Michael Lookinland (b. July 6, 1990), who portrayed him in Growing Up Brady (2000), and Joseph Kelly "Joe" Lookinland (born August 6, 1993), both born in Utah. The two worked together, with Lookinland as a production assistant and Wermuth as an extra on Halloween 4: The Return of Michael Myers and Halloween 5: The Revenge of Michael Myers.

Lookinland is a self-described Deadhead, having attended more than 100 Grateful Dead concerts and shows. Since 2018, he plays keyboards and sings lead vocals for the Utah-based Grateful Dead tribute band, The Pranksters. The band performs Grateful Dead music and features Lookinland alongside other members Rich Melton, Kevin Gillars, Doug Worthen, and Ron Reich (and previously, Lookinland's son Scott on guitar and lead vocals). In 1989, the California skate rock band Wonderful Broken Thing recorded their debut full-length album "Looking For Mike Lookinland"; several songs from this album were featured on the H-Street video "Hokus Pokus."

On November 9, 1997, shortly after 7:30 p.m., after leaving the set of the TV series Promised Land in St. George, Utah, where he worked as first assistant cameraman, Lookinland was driving in his 1990 Ford Bronco on Utah State Route 18, 35 miles north of St. George, when he looked down to adjust the radio as he was approaching a curve and drifted onto the left shoulder. He then overcorrected when trying to steer back onto the pavement and rolled at least two times off the right side of the road. His blood alcohol content was 0.258, more than three times over Utah's legal limit of 0.08. After being treated for minor injuries at Dixie Regional Medical Center, he was booked into Washington County Jail, but released on a $1,550 bail.

In December, he completed court-ordered rehabilitation service for the driving incident. On May 27, 1998, Lookinland was sentenced to 24 hours of community service and fined $1,500. He cited this incident as having inspired him to stop drinking.

== Filmography ==
=== Film ===
Year	Title	Role	Notes
1974	The Towering Inferno	Phillip Allbright	
1988	Halloween 4: The Return of Michael Myers	N/A	Production assistant
1988	Halloween 5: The Revenge of Michael Myers	N/A	Additional first assistant camera, additional photography
1995	The Brady Bunch Movie	Cop #3	Scenes deleted
2003	Dickie Roberts: Former Child Star	Mike Lookinland	

=== Television ===
Year	Title	Role	Notes
1969–1974	The Brady Bunch	Robert 'Bobby' Brady	Main role
1971	The Point	Oblio/Son (voice)	TV film
1971	Bayou Boy	Claude	Disney TV film
1971	Funny Face	Richie	Episode: "A Crush on Sandy"
1971	Dead Men Tell No Tales	Bud Riley	TV film
1972	The ABC Saturday Superstar Movie	Bobby Brady (voice)	Episode: "The Brady Kids on Mysterious Island"
1972–74	The Brady Kids	Bobby Brady (voice)	Main role
1975	Isis	Tom Anderson	Episode: "How to Find a Friend"
1976–77	The Brady Bunch Hour	Bobby Brady	Main role
1977	Little House on the Prairie	Patrick	Episode: "Times of Change"
1981	The Brady Girls Get Married	Bobby Brady	TV film
1988	A Very Brady Christmas	Bobby Brady	TV film
1989	Day by Day	Bobby Brady	Episode: "A Very Brady Episode"
1990	The Bradys	Bobby Brady	Main role
1994	The Stand	Sentry #1, plus Second Assistant Cameraman	Episode: "The Stand"
1994	Gambler V: Playing for Keeps	Bosun	TV film
2000	Growing Up Brady	Camera Man	TV film
2019	A Very Brady Renovation	Himself	Main role
2021	Dragging the Classics: The Brady Bunch	Bobby Brady	Paramount+ special
2021	Blending Christmas	Andrew	TV film
2022	The Masked Singer	Himself/Mummy	Season 8 contestant; Group costume with Barry Williams and Christopher Knight
