= The Brady Bunch Movie =

1995 film by Betty Thomas

- Theatrical release poster
- Directed by: Betty Thomas
- Written by: Laurice Elehwany; Rick Copp; Bonnie Turner; Terry Turner
- Based on: The Brady Bunch by Sherwood Schwartz
- Produced by: David Kirkpatrick; Sherwood Schwartz; Lloyd J. Schwartz
- Starring: Shelley Long; Gary Cole; Michael McKean
- Cinematography: Mac Ahlberg
- Edited by: Peter Teschner
- Music by: Guy Moon
- Production companies: The Ladd Company; Sherwood Schwartz Productions
- Distributed by: Paramount Pictures
- Release date: February 17, 1995
- Running time: 88 minutes
- Country: United States
- Language: English
- Budget: $10–12 million
- Box office: $54.1 million

The Brady Bunch Movie is a 1995 American comedy film loosely based on the television series created by Sherwood Schwartz. The film was directed by Betty Thomas, with a screenplay by Rick Copp, and Bonnie and Terry Turner, and stars Shelley Long, Gary Cole, and Michael McKean, along with cameos from three Monkees members, Davy Jones, Micky Dolenz and Peter Tork and drag queen, RuPaul, and some of the original cast of The Brady Bunch in new roles.

The film (likewise with the connected sequels) is an alternate retroactive continuity of the Brady Bunch storyline and lore, based on the kitschy-camp parody musical "Live Brady Bunch" tour in the early 1990s. The film places the original sitcom characters, with their 1970s fashion sense and sitcom family morality, in a contemporary 1990s setting. Mike Brady works as a successful architect in Los Angeles. Due to failure to pay property tax, his family's home is at risk for repossession. Mike has to contend with his conman neighbor Larry Dittmeyer, who tries to sabotage the Bradys' effort to save their home. The film features humorous side plots, based around the culture clash between the Bradys' quaint conservative lifestyle and their more liberal surroundings.

The Brady Bunch Movie was released in the United States by Paramount Pictures on February 17, 1995, and grossed $54 million. A sequel titled A Very Brady Sequel was released on August 23, 1996, and a television film titled The Brady Bunch in the White House was aired on November 29, 2002.

== Plot ==
Larry Dittmeyer, an unscrupulous real estate developer, convinces all the families in his neighborhood—except for the Bradys—to sell their property as part of a plan to turn the area into a shopping mall.

The Bradys, who still live as if it were the 1970s, have their own problems. Jan is jealous of her elder, popular sister Marcia. Cindy is tattling about everything she hears. Greg is dreaming of becoming a singer, but sings pop songs more appropriate to the 1970s.

Peter is undergoing puberty, and his voice is starting to break. He is exposed to numerous stimuli through sex education and his very attractive teacher, Miss Linley. Peter is also trying to win the affection of the girl he loves, Holly, but thinks his shy and awkward personality prevents him from doing so. Bobby is excited about his new role as a hall monitor at school.

Cindy gives Mike and Carol a tax delinquency notice (mistakenly delivered to the Dittmeyers) stating that they face foreclosure on their house if they do not pay $20,000 in back taxes. The two initially ignore the crisis, but when Mike's architectural design (which is exactly the same as their house) is turned down by two potential clients, he tells Carol that they may have to sell the house.

Cindy overhears this and tells her siblings. They look for work to raise money to save the house, but their earnings are nowhere near enough to reach the required sum. Mike sells a Japanese company on one of his dated designs, thereby securing the money, only for Larry to sabotage it by claiming that Mike's last building collapsed.

On the night before the Bradys have to move out, Marcia suggests they enter a "Search for the Stars" contest, the prize of which is $20,000. Jan, having initially suggested this and been rejected, runs away from home. Cindy sees her leave and tattles, and the whole family searches for her. They use their car's citizens' band radio, and their transmission is heard by Schultzy, a long-haul trucker who picks up Jan and convinces her to return home.

The next day, the children join the "Search for the Stars" contest. Peter finally builds the confidence to stand up to Eric Dittmeyer, Peter's tormentor and Holly's boyfriend. This earns him a kiss from Holly, which gives him a deep masculine voice.

The children's dated performance receives a poor audience response compared to the more modern performances of other bands. However, the judges—Davy Jones, Micky Dolenz, and Peter Tork of The Monkees—vote for them, and they win the contest as a result. The tax bill is paid, and their neighbors withdraw their homes from the market, foiling Larry's plan and securing the neighborhood.

Carol's mother arrives and finally convinces Jan to stop being jealous of Marcia, only for Cindy to start feeling envious of Jan.

== Cast ==
- Gary Cole as Mike Brady
- Shelley Long as Carol Brady
- Christopher Daniel Barnes as Greg Brady
- Christine Taylor as Marcia Brady
- Paul Sutera as Peter Brady
- Jennifer Elise Cox as Jan Brady
- Jesse Lee Soffer as Bobby Brady
- Olivia Hack as Cindy Brady
- Henriette Mantel as Alice Nelson
- David Graf as Sam Franklin
- Michael McKean as Larry Dittmeyer
- Jean Smart as Dina Dittmeyer
- Jack Noseworthy as Eric Dittmeyer
- Moriah Snyder as Missy Dittmeyer
- Shane Conrad as Doug Simpson
- R. D. Robb as Charlie Anderson
- Megan Ward as Donna Leonard
- David Leisure as Jason
- Alanna Ubach as Noreen
- Marissa Ribisi as Holly
- James Avery as Steve Yeager
- Elisa Pensler-Gabrielli as Miss Linley
- RuPaul as Mrs. Cummings

Cameos

- Florence Henderson as Grandma
- Ann B. Davis as Trucker
- Barry Williams as Music Producer
- Christopher Knight as Coach
- Davy Jones as himself
- Micky Dolenz as himself
- Peter Tork as himself

== Production ==
In September 1992, it was announced Sherwood Schwartz and his son Lloyd J. Schwartz had sold The Brady Bunch Movie to Paramount Pictures with producer David Kirkpatrick set to produce alongside the Schwartzes with the initial intention to have the film set in 1972. In June 1993, it was announced Rick Copp and Laurice Elehwany had been hired to rewrite the first draft by the Schwartzes with the premise described as The Desperate Hours meets The Brady Bunch and follow the Brady family falling victim to a home invasion by escaped prisoners who then proceed to hold the family hostage while they hide from the authorities. Copp and Elehwany were reportedly hired to bring a parody element to the script which included having the Brady Family act as they did in the 1970s while living in contemporary times. Paramount offered directing duties to Paul Reubens with Reubens turning them down. Alan Ladd Jr. took on a producer's role on the film after Kirkpatrick left Paramount. Ladd voiced his hopes that The Brady Bunch Movie would be the first in a long running franchise citing his prior success shepherding The Omen, Police Academy, and Alien during his tenure at other studios.

The film was shot almost entirely in Los Angeles, California, with the Brady house being located in Sherman Oaks. The school scenes were shot at Taft High School in Woodland Hills.

The producers had sought to film the original house that had been used for exterior shots during the original Brady Bunch series, but its appearance had been seriously altered since 1969. The filmmakers instead erected a façade around a house in nearby Encino and filmed scenes in the front yard.

== Release ==
The Brady Bunch Movie was released in theaters on February 17, 1995. The film opened at number 1 at the US box office with $14.8 million in its opening four-day weekend and went on to gross $46.6 million in the U.S. and Canada. Internationally, it only grossed $7.5 million for a worldwide total of $54.1 million. The Brady Bunch Movie was released on DVD June 10, 2003 and re-released on April 25, 2017. The film has also been released digitally on Google Play.

== Reception and legacy ==
On the review aggregator website Rotten Tomatoes, 64% of 44 critics' reviews are positive, with an average rating of 5.9/10. The website's consensus reads: "Though lightweight and silly, The Brady Bunch Movie still charms as homage to the 70s sitcom." Metacritic, which uses a weighted average, assigned the film a score of 54 out of 100, based on 23 critics, indicating "mixed or average" reviews. Audiences surveyed by CinemaScore gave the film an average grade of "B+" on a scale of A+ to F.

Leonard Klady of Variety wrote, "For five years back in the early 1970s, U.S. TV homes were in the thrall of The Brady Bunch. Two decades after their small-screen demise, the clean-cut crew is back in mythic form as The Brady Bunch Movie. Part homage, part spoof, the deft balancing act is a clever adaptation—albeit culled from less than pedigreed source material."

Roger Ebert of the Chicago Sun-Times wrote: "The film establishes a bland, reassuring, comforting Brady reality – a certain muted tone that works just fine but needs, I think, a bleaker contrast from outside to fully exploit the humor. The Brady Bunch Movie is rated PG-13, which is a compromise: The Bradys themselves live in a PG universe, and the movie would have been funnier if when they ventured outside it was obviously Wayne's World." He and Gene Siskel also agreed that the film offers charmingly bright and silly set decoration but fails to deliver genuine laughs.

Common Sense Media said that "for those who grew up watching the TV show, The Brady Bunch Movie is deeply satisfying and the best part is its nostalgia. Sure, it's fun to see the Bradys treated as freaks. But the heart of the film is a campy, affectionate interpretation of the TV show."

=== Sequels ===
==== A Very Brady Sequel ====
A Very Brady Sequel, directed by Arlene Sanford, was released theatrically on August 23, 1996. It sees the family routine thrown into disarray when a man claiming to be Carol's long-lost first husband arrives on their doorstep. The family must then follow Carol to Hawaii in order to set things straight. The entire main cast reprised their roles.

==== The Brady Bunch in the White House ====
The second sequel, The Brady Bunch in the White House, sees a convoluted series of mishaps end with Mike and Carol Brady elected as President and Vice President of the United States. Despite innocent efforts to improve the country, the Brady family is beset on all sides by controversy and imagined scandals which threaten to tear them apart. Although the original actors for Mike and Carol return, the children and Alice are all recast for this film, which was released as a filmed-for-television movie.

== See also ==
- 1970s nostalgia
