= Susan Olsen =

American actress (born 1961)

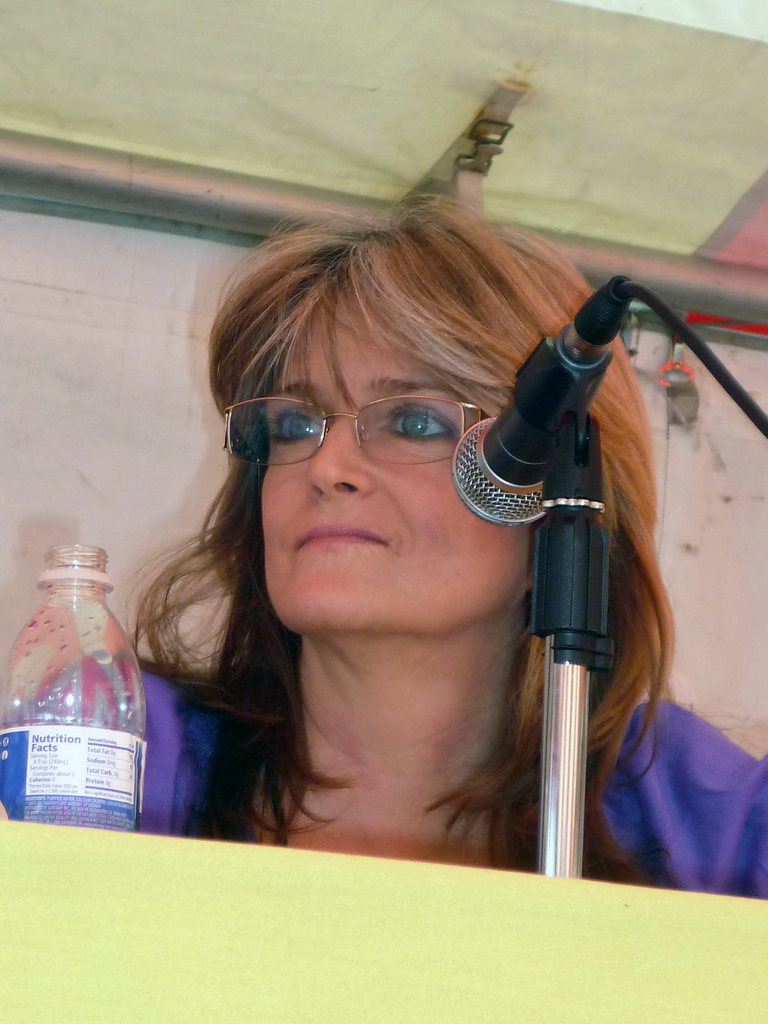
- Olsen in 2009
- Born: Susan Marie Olsen; August 14, 1961 (age 65); Santa Monica, California, U.S.
- Education: William Howard Taft High School
- Occupations: Actress; radio personality
- Years active: 1968–present
- Known for: The Brady Bunch; The Brady Kids; The Bradys
- Spouse(s): Steve Ventimiglia (m. 1988; div. 1990) Mitch Skelly (m. 1995; div. 2004)
- Children: 1

Susan Marie Olsen (born August 14, 1961) is an American actress and former radio personality. Olsen is known for her role as Cindy Brady, the youngest Brady child in the sitcom The Brady Bunch for the full run of the show, from 1969 to 1974.

== Early life ==
Olsen was born in Santa Monica, California, to Lawrence and DeLoice Olsen, the youngest of four children.

Olsen graduated from William H. Taft High School in Woodland Hills, California in 1979.

== Acting career ==
=== Early roles and The Brady Bunch ===
Olsen landed a number of supporting roles in television, most notably in Ironside, Gunsmoke, and Julia, and appeared in the Elvis Presley movie The Trouble With Girls (1968) as a squeaky-clean singer in a singing contest.

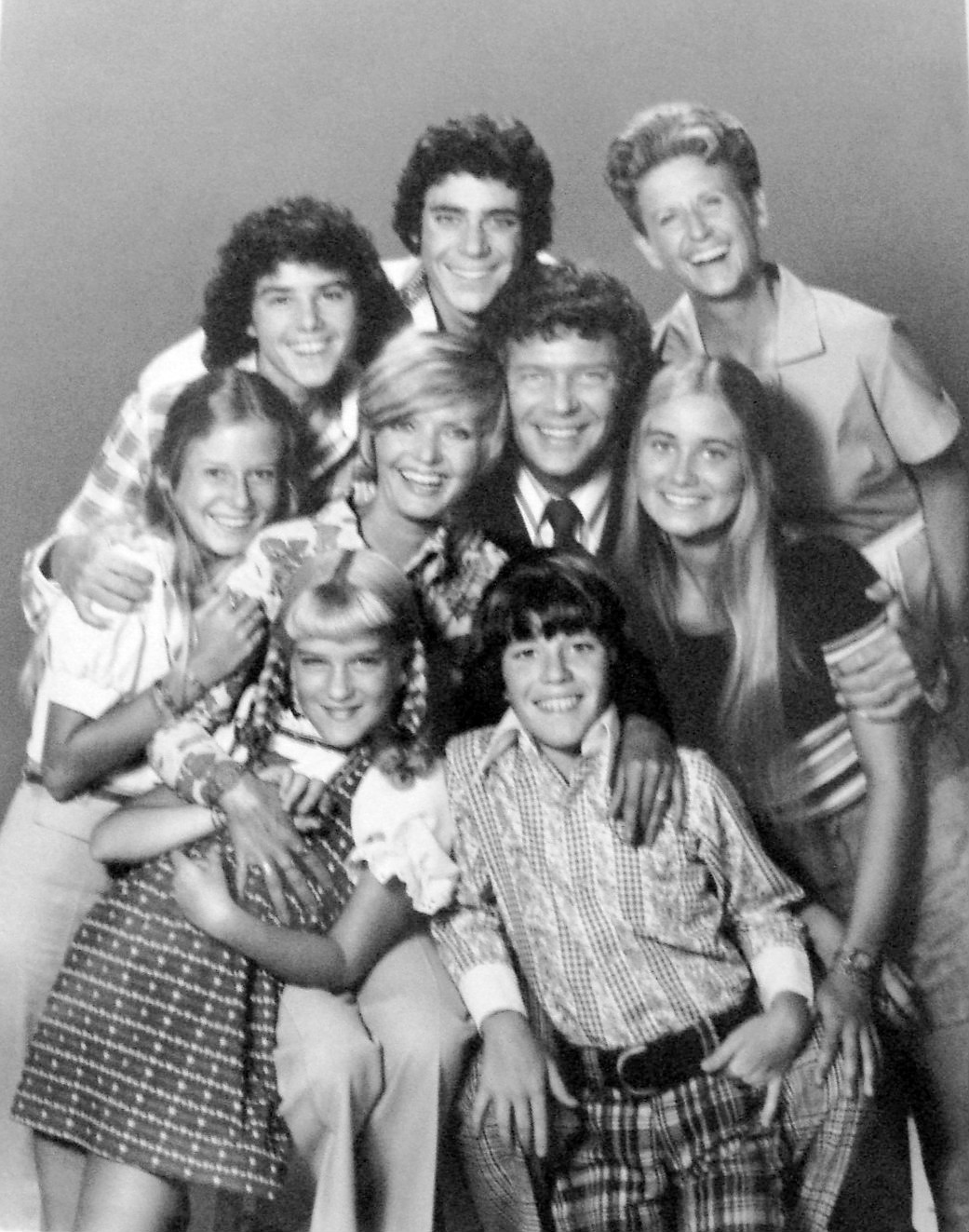
Cast photo of The Brady Bunch. Back (L-R): Christopher Knight (Peter), Barry Williams (Greg), Ann B. Davis (Alice). Second row (L-R): Eve Plumb (Jan), Florence Henderson (Carol), Robert Reed (Mike), Maureen McCormick (Marcia). Front (L-R): Susan Olsen (Cindy), Mike Lookinland (Bobby).

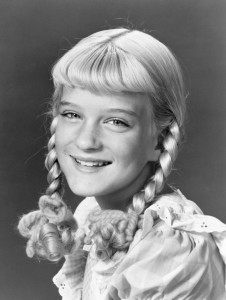
Olsen as Cindy Brady, the youngest of The Brady Bunch

At just under age eight, Olsen was cast as Cindy Brady on The Brady Bunch (1969–1974). As an adult, Olsen has said that portraying Cindy made friendships difficult for her as a child. She most disliked the season two "tattletale" episode, in which Cindy incessantly tattles on her siblings. Because of the episode, she was shunned by real-life peers, who did not understand the difference between actors and their characters. She was also the voice of Cindy in the ABC Saturday morning cartoon The Brady Kids (1972–1974). Olsen has appeared in all Brady Bunch reunion movies and specials with the exception of A Very Brady Christmas (1988), which was filmed when she and her first husband Steve Ventimiglia were on their honeymoon. In that movie, Cindy Brady was played by actress Jennifer Runyon. Olsen has openly acknowledged that she felt Cindy Brady was presented as too stupid throughout the time she played her, though she could adapt to it, with her mother encouraging her that the role was also cute.

In 2005, VH1 ranked her No. 34 in The 100 Greatest Kid Stars of television and film. In 2007, Olsen and her fellow cast members were honored with the TV Pop Culture Award on the TV Land Awards, one of the few awards The Brady Bunch has ever won.

As a teen, Olsen was the spokesgirl for Sindy doll, made by Marx Toys from the mid-1970s. As an adult, Olsen moved into the graphic design business and in 1998 briefly marketed a brand of glow-in-the-dark shoes for Converse. She also worked as a talk show host at the Los Angeles radio station KLSX from 1995 to 1996 with Ken Ober, and co-hosted and co-wrote another radio show with comedian Allan Havey at Comedy World in 2000.

=== After The Brady Bunch ===
Along with Brady Bunch costar Mike Lookinland, she auditioned for The Swiss Family Robinson television series in 1975. Her role was eventually played by Helen Hunt. In 1976, she signed on for the variety show, The Brady Bunch Hour, which lasted nine episodes.

After graduating from high school in 1979, her acting roles were few, save for several Brady Bunch reunion specials. She reprised her role as Cindy Brady in The Brady Brides in 1981, and the short-lived CBS drama series The Bradys in 1990. An urban legend claimed that Olsen had become an adult film star. In a late 1990s television interview, Olsen stated that her "porn" connection was that she created space ship sound effects for a porn film called Love Probe from a Warm Planet.

She appeared in episode 26 of Cartoon Network's talk show Space Ghost Coast to Coast, "Switcheroo", with Cassandra Peterson as "Elvira, Mistress of the Dark". Olsen has also been an advocate for migraine sufferers since 1998. She described her headaches on Larry King Live.

In the fourth quarter of 2008, Olsen appeared on Fox Reality's Gimme My Reality Show, in which celebrities compete to win their own reality show. She used this vehicle to make a statement about animal rescue, a cause with which she is deeply involved. On June 6, 2009, Olsen thanked retired game show host and animal rights activist Bob Barker when the Brady actors accepted an honor at the GSN Awards. An animal welfare advocate, she has served on the board of directors of the non-profit organization Precious Paws, a rescue group.

On September 1, 2009, Olsen released the coffee table book Love to Love You Bradys: The Bizarre Story of The Brady Bunch Variety Hour that celebrates the 1976–1977 television variety show The Brady Bunch Hour.

In September 2010, Olsen made a guest appearance on The Young and the Restless playing Mrs. Liza Morton, the owner of a preschool.

In 2011, she appeared in season 3, episode 43 of The Biography Channel's reality show Celebrity Ghost Stories.

In July 2012, Olsen was one of a limited number of artists and celebrities invited to show their work in Art with an Agenda: An Exhibit Inspired by Kelly Thomas at the PAS Gallery in Fullerton, California, inspired by the life and circumstances surrounding the killing of Kelly Thomas, a homeless, schizophrenic, 37-year-old man who was beaten by members of the Fullerton Police Department on July 5, 2011. Olsen's piece, "Still Life", showed a half-eaten donut in a puddle of blood beside a lit flashlight.

In December 2016, Olsen was reportedly let go from her radio show, "Two Chicks Talkin' Politics" on LA Talk Radio, after engaging in a Facebook feud with openly gay actor Leon Acord-Whiting. Responding to comments Acord-Whiting had made about her on another station, Olsen unleashed a profane rant against him, accusing him of cowardice. Acord-Whiting accused Olsen of homophobia for the remarks (which included repeated use of the word "faggot") and successfully lobbied to have Olsen fired. Despite this, Olsen told Fox News in 2019 that she has "been the subject of fake news" and "never got fired".

Olsen joined with the other surviving main cast members of The Brady Bunch in the 2019 television series A Very Brady Renovation on HGTV. In 2021, she starred in the Lifetime Christmas movie Blending Christmas alongside her Brady Bunch co-stars Christopher Knight, Mike Lookinland, Barry Williams, and Robbie Rist.

== Filmography ==
=== Film ===
Year	Title	Role	Notes
1969	The Trouble with Girls	Auditioning Singer	
1995	The Brady Bunch Movie	Mailwoman	Scenes deleted
2009	Zombo	Frumpy Woman	Short
2015	Mama Claus, Deck the Halls with Guts	Mama Claus	

=== Television ===
Year	Title	Role	Notes
1968	Ironside	Tracy Richards	"Barbara Who"
1968	Julia	Pamela	"Paint Your Waggedorn"
1968–69	Gunsmoke	Marianne Johnson	"Abelia", "A Man Called 'Smith'"
1969–1974	The Brady Bunch	Cindy Brady	Main role
1970	The Boy Who Stole the Elephant	Lucy Owens	Disney TV film
1972	The ABC Saturday Superstar Movie	Cindy Brady (voice)	"The Brady Kids on Mysterious Island"
1972–74	The Brady Kids	Cindy Brady (voice)	Main role
1976–77	The Brady Bunch Hour	Cindy Brady	Main role
1981	The Brady Girls Get Married	Cindy Brady	TV film
1990	The Bradys	Cindy Brady	Main role
1999	Pacific Blue	Cindy Russell	"Stargazer"
2010	The Young and the Restless	Liza Morton	2 episodes
2012	The Great Halloween Puppy Adventure	Rachel	TV film
2013	Holiday Road Trip	Edna	TV film
2013–2016	Child of the '70s	Nickel Laundry	TV series
2019	A Very Brady Renovation	Susan Olsen	TV series
2021	Dragging the Classics: The Brady Bunch	Margie	Paramount Plus TV special
2021	Blending Christmas	Valerie	TV film

== Book ==
- Love to Love You Bradys: The Bizarre Story of The Brady Bunch Variety Hour (2009) - ISBN 9781550228885 (with Ted Nichelson and Lisa Sutton)
