= Sherwood Schwartz =

American TV writer, producer (1916–2011)

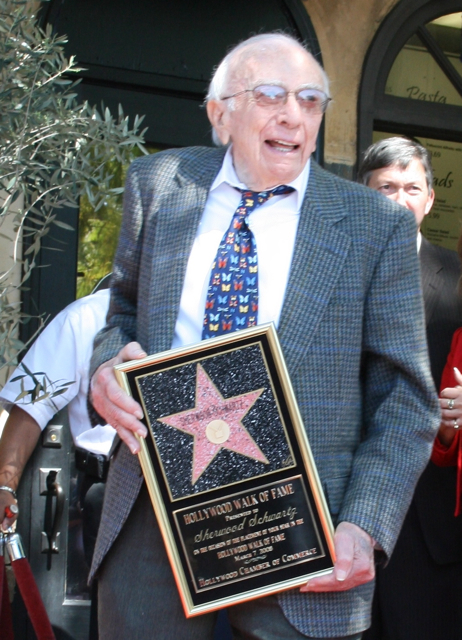
- Schwartz receiving his star on the Hollywood Walk of Fame (2008)
- Born: Sherwood Charles Schwartz; November 14, 1916; Passaic, New Jersey, U.S.
- Died: July 12, 2011 (aged 94); Los Angeles, California, U.S.
- Resting place: Hillside Memorial Park, Culver City, California
- Occupations: Television producer; screenwriter
- Years active: 1938–2011
- Spouse: Mildred Seidman Schwartz (m. 1941)
- Children: 4, including Lloyd
- Awards: Hollywood Walk of Fame

Sherwood Charles Schwartz (/ʃwɔːrts/ SHWORTS; November 14, 1916 – July 12, 2011) was an American television screenwriter and producer. He worked on radio shows in the 1940s, but he now is best known for creating the 1960s television series Gilligan's Island on CBS and The Brady Bunch on ABC. On March 7, 2008, Schwartz, at the time still active in his 90s, was honored with a star on the Hollywood Walk of Fame. That same year, Schwartz was also inducted into the Television Hall of Fame.

== Early life ==
Schwartz was born in Passaic, New Jersey, to a Jewish family. His parents were Herman Schwartz (1882–1955) and Rose (née Kaplan) Schwartz (1888–1984). He was a younger brother of writer Al Schwartz (1910–1988). His younger brother, Elroy Schwartz (1923–2013), a comedy writer, became a principal screenwriter for Gilligan's Island and other series. Sherwood Schwartz is the uncle of Douglas Schwartz (who created the Baywatch TV series), Bruce Schwartz, and Judithe Randall.

== Career ==
Schwartz had hoped to become a doctor, but found that he was unable to be admitted to medical school at that time, due to a quota limiting the number of Jewish students.

Schwartz went on to write for Ozzie Nelson's The Adventures of Ozzie and Harriet and other radio shows. Schwartz served in the United States Army for over four years. While serving, he was a writer on the Armed Forces Radio Network before he got his break in television. From 1956 to 1962, Schwartz was head writer for The Red Skelton Show, for which he won an Emmy Award in 1961. He went on to create and produce Gilligan's Island and The Brady Bunch. He wrote the theme songs for three of his shows: Gilligan's Island (co-wrote), It's About Time, and The Brady Bunch.

Syndication turned his two major successes into TV institutions with cultural relevance. Schwartz made them icons, and as a result became a television icon himself.

== TV appearances ==
During the late 1990s and the 2000s, Schwartz made many appearances on TV talking about his series, on shows such as the CBS Evening News, 20/20, TV Land's Top Ten and A&E's Biography. He also took part in a "Creators" marathon on Nick at Nite in the late 1990s. He was also a guest at the 2004 TV Land Awards.

In 1988, Schwartz appeared on The Late Show with Ross Shafer for a Gilligan's Island reunion, along with all seven castaways from Gilligan's Island. This was the last time they were all together on television. He also appeared as himself in a 1995 episode of Roseanne titled "Sherwood Schwartz, A Loving Tribute", which also featured the four surviving "Gilligan's Island" cast members.

== Personal life ==
On December 21, 1941, Sherwood Schwartz married Mildred Seidman, and together they had four children: Donald Schwartz, who became an ophthalmologist; Lloyd J. Schwartz, who worked with his father in show business as a writer and producer in his own right; Ross Schwartz, an attorney and screenwriter whose credits include Bottle Shock; and Hope Juber, a writer and producer. His granddaughter is singer-songwriter Ilsey Juber, the daughter of Hope and guitarist Laurence Juber, the former lead guitarist for the band Wings.

Sherwood Schwartz's play, Rockers, a comedy-drama, had a production at Theatre West in honor of his 90th birthday.

== Death ==
Schwartz died of natural causes in his sleep on July 12, 2011, at the age of 94.

== Portrayals ==
Schwartz was portrayed by Aaron Lustig in the TV movie Surviving Gilligan's Island and by Michael Tucker in Growing Up Brady.

== Filmography ==
Schwartz produced a number of radio and TV shows during his career.

Series	Years	Job
The Bob Hope Show	1938–1942	Writer for radio version
The Adventures of Ozzie and Harriet	1940s	Writer for radio version
The Alan Young Show	1940s	Writer for radio version
I Married Joan	1952–1955	Writer
The Red Skelton Show	1956–1962	Writer
My Favorite Martian	1963	Script supervisor
Gilligan's Island	1964–1967	Writer, creator, producer
It's About Time	1966–1967	Writer, creator, producer
The Brady Bunch	1969–1974	Writer, creator, producer
Dusty's Trail	1973–1974	Writer, creator, producer
Big John, Little John	1976	Producer
Harper Valley PTA	1981–1982	Writer, producer
Together We Stand	1986–1987	Writer, producer

== Stage productions ==
In 1990, Schwartz wrote Gilligan's Island: The Musical, still in production as of 2011. His son Lloyd, daughter Hope, and son-in-law Laurence Juber worked on the play as well.

On November 10, 2006, Schwartz's play Rockers opened in Theatre West in California. The play concerns the lives of three women living in a retirement home. The cast included Pat Crawford Brown, Lee Meriwether, and Elsa Raven.

== Unsold pilots ==
He wrote and executive produced two unsold television pilots:

- Scamps (1982)—starring Bob Denver, Dreama Denver, and Joey Lawrence
- The Invisible Woman (1983)—starring Alexa Hamilton, Bob Denver, and Harvey Korman

== Awards ==
- Schwartz won the 1961 Emmy Award for his writing on The Red Skelton Show.
- He was nominated for a Daytime Emmy for his 2004 special Still Brady After All These Years
- On March 7, 2008, Schwartz received a star on the Hollywood Walk of Fame. Actresses Dawn Wells and Florence Henderson, who appeared in Gilligan's Island and The Brady Bunch, respectively, accompanied Schwartz when he received his star. Also present was Patrick Denver, son of actor Bob Denver from Gilligan's Island, and Christopher Knight and Susan Olsen, the child stars of The Brady Bunch.
- Schwartz was inducted into the Television Hall of Fame in 2008.
