= List of The Brady Bunch episodes =

The Brady Bunch Ending grid in season one. Click on each character for the actor's article.

The Brady Bunch is a sitcom created by Sherwood Schwartz. The show follows Mike Brady (Robert Reed), a widowed architect with sons Greg (Barry Williams), Peter (Christopher Knight) and Bobby (Mike Lookinland). Mike marries Carol Martin (Florence Henderson), whose daughters from her previous marriage are Marcia (Maureen McCormick), Jan (Eve Plumb) and Cindy (Susan Olsen). They all move into the house designed by Mike in the Los Angeles' suburbs. Also living with them is the housekeeper, Alice (Ann B. Davis), and the dog, Tiger. Some episodes tended to center on the kids' misadventures that often led to Mike and Carol steering the kids in the right direction.

The series premiered on ABC on September 26, 1969. The series ran for five seasons, with all 117 episodes originally airing on Fridays. The series ran in the 8 p.m. U.S. Eastern time slot, with the exception of season two, which aired at 7:30 p.m. Throughout its original run The Brady Bunch received mainly negative reviews and never broke into the Nielsen top 30. However, the ratings were solid enough for the show to remain on the air for five seasons, peaking at #31 in its third season. Ratings began to dip in season five, and in order to boost viewership of its much-needed younger audience, Schwartz introduced a new character: the Bradys' cousin Oliver (Robbie Rist) late in the season. Schwartz's plan failed, and the series was canceled before the start of the 1974 fall season.

Of the nine main cast members, only Florence Henderson, Ann B. Davis, and Barry Williams appear in all 117 episodes. Robert Reed does not appear in two episodes ("Goodbye, Alice, Hello" in season 4, and the final episode of the series). Each of the other five Brady kids is absent from one of five different episodes during season two. The show also featured a number of guest stars of that era, such as Davy Jones, Desi Arnaz Jr., Vincent Price, Joe Namath and Deacon Jones; of these, only Vincent Price did not play himself.

The episodes aired on ABC in an order different from when they were produced. When put into syndication, the episodes began airing in the order in which they were made. On the DVD releases, all the episodes are in the order in which they originally aired.

== Series overview ==
Season	Episodes	Originally released		
Season	Episodes	First released	Last released	Network
1	25	September 26, 1969	March 20, 1970	ABC
2	24	September 25, 1970	March 19, 1971	ABC
3	23	September 17, 1971	March 10, 1972	ABC
4	23	September 22, 1972	March 23, 1973	ABC
5	22	September 14, 1973	March 8, 1974	ABC

== Episodes ==
=== Season 1 (1969–70) ===
No. overall	No. in season	Title	Directed by	Written by	Original release date	Prod. code
1	1	"The Honeymoon"	John Rich	Sherwood Schwartz	September 26, 1969	000
Michael Paul Brady, an architect and widower with three sons (Greg, Peter and Bobby) marries Carol Ann Martin, a mother with three daughters (Marcia, Jan and Cindy). Mike and Carol's backyard wedding turns to chaos when the boys' dog, Tiger, chases the girls' cat, Fluffy. Mike and Carol yell at their children to catch their pets. The newlywed couple goes on a honeymoon later that day, while the children sit at home thinking that their parents took sides. While on their honeymoon, Mike and Carol can't enjoy themselves, and decide to make it up to the children by bringing them on their honeymoon. Alice the housekeeper and their pets join them. Guest stars: J. Pat O'Malley as Henry Tyler, Joan Tompkins as Mrs. Tyler, and Dabbs Greer as The Minister
2	2	"Dear Libby"	John Rich	Lois Hire	October 3, 1969	002
The kids worry when a published letter to the "Dear Libby" advice column from "Harried and Hopeless" mirrors the Bradys' new living situation. Thinking one of their parents wrote the letter the kids stay on their best behavior to ensure a harmonious domestic situation. Elizabeth "Dear Libby" Carter (Jo De Winter) visits the Brady home explaining she received seven similar letters from the same address: they are from "Kitty Karry-All" (Cindy), "Feeling Awful" (Bobby), "Desperately Worried" (Marcia), "Down in the Mouth" (Peter), "Real Frantic" (Jan), "Guilt Complex" (Greg), and "Innocent Bystander" (Alice). Libby explains that the "Harried and Hopeless" letter originated from someone else, 2,000 miles (3200 km) away. Later on, Mike and Carol both admit they also wrote letters to "Dear Libby", but neither sent theirs.
3	3	"Eenie, Meenie, Mommy, Daddy"	John Rich	Joanna Lee	October 10, 1969	005
Cindy is starring in the school play The Frog Prince as the fairy princess. She is very excited at the thought of her entire family watching her in the play, then is heartbroken when she discovers that she can only bring one parent, and she has much difficulty picking between Mike and Carol. This is resolved by the whole family being allowed to sit through a dress rehearsal. Guest stars: Marjorie Stamp as Mrs. Engstrom, Tracy Reed as Miss Sherry Marlowe, Brian Forster as the elf
4	4	"Alice Doesn't Live Here Anymore"	John Rich	Paul West	October 17, 1969	006
Alice discovers that the boys are going to Carol with their problems instead of her. Thinking that the family no longer needs her, she invents a story about a "sick aunt in Seattle". When Marcia and Jan overhear Alice on the phone to a friend and discover the ruse, they tell their parents. The family devises a plan to prove to Alice that they still need and want her, and are successful.
5	5	"Katchoo"	John Rich	William Cowley	October 24, 1969	004
Jan's allergies are acting up, so Carol keeps her home from school. Alice and Carol are worried, that she might be allergic to Mike or one of the boys. When it seems that Jan is allergic to Tiger, the family fear they might have to lose their pet dog. Marcia and Cindy secretly give Tiger a bath, hoping it will remedy the situation, but then the boys, then Alice, and finally Mike each secretly do the same. In the end, it turns out that Jan's only allergic to Tiger's new flea powder.
6	6	"A Clubhouse Is Not a Home"	John Rich	Skip Webster	October 31, 1969	001
Interpersonal relations among the kids reach a low after the boys refuse the girls entry to their clubhouse. Mike tries to reason with Carol that men sometimes need a place of their own. In the name of gender equality, Carol and the girls attempt to build their own clubhouse. They do a shoddy construction job and Cindy is nearly injured. Mike and the boys rebuild the clubhouse but the boys' clubhouse suddenly collapses: Bobby had pulled out the nails from the boys' clubhouse to finish the girls' clubhouse. Guest stars: June Foray as Sandra (voice only; uncredited), Hans Conried as Lance (voice only; uncredited)
7	7	"Kitty Karry-All Is Missing"	John Rich	Al Schwartz & Bill Freedman	November 7, 1969	003
After Cindy and Bobby get mad at each other, Cindy loses her doll. She accuses Bobby of "doll-napping" and won't believe him when he says he didn't take it. This causes a rift between boys (who believe Bobby is innocent) and girls (who believe Bobby is guilty). A mock trial is held for Bobby, during which Jan suddenly votes Bobby as innocent (against Marcia's expectations) and Peter votes Bobby as guilty (against Greg's expectations), which then causes a rift between Marcia and Jan and between Greg and Peter. Next, Bobby's kazoo goes missing, and he retaliates by blaming Cindy for stealing it. Bobby realizes that Cindy is very sad, and he spends all of his money on a new doll for her, but she will not accept it. After it goes missing too, the clues then lead to the real culprit: Tiger. Note: In 2021, a clip from this episode is shown in the WandaVision episode "Previously On". The series' third episode, "Now in Color", is a tribute to sitcoms of the 1970s, including The Brady Bunch.
8	8	"A-Camping We Will Go"	Oscar Rudolph	Herbert Finn & Alan Dinehart	November 14, 1969	012
Mike and the boys have gone camping once a year for several years and Carol and Mike insist on a camping trip for all the family. The girls do not want to participate, and the boys do not want them along either. The family trip starts out a failure, with several fishing trips gone wrong. However, the girls remedy the situation with some cold cuts they happened to bring along. Later that night, the girls are spooked by the wilderness, and in return scare the boys by pretending there's a bear outside their tent. In the end, the children realize they had a great time together and agree to go on all future trips together.
9	9	"Sorry, Right Number"	George Cahan	Ruth Brooks Flippen	November 21, 1969	009
A huge phone bill prompts Mike to have a pay telephone installed to teach the kids a lesson in financial responsibility. His plan nearly backfires when he is forced to use the payphone to close a deal. Thankfully, his client has three teenagers of his own and understands Mike's situation and even installs a pay phone in his own home. Guest star: Howard Culver as Mr. Crawford
10	10	"Every Boy Does It Once"	Oscar Rudolph	Lois Peyser & Arnold Peyser	December 5, 1969	014
After Bobby watches a television adaptation of "Cinderella", older stepsisters Marcia and Jan tease him, then Carol asks for his help in sweeping the chimney. Bobby reasons that what he just saw on TV was correct: All stepmothers and stepsisters are evil. Feeling unloved and unwanted, he decides to run away. He changes his mind when Carol announces her plans to go with him, as the only "steps" in their family, are the ones used to get to different floors in the house. Guest stars: Michael Lerner as Johnny, Larry McCormick as the TV announcer (voice only)
11	11	"Vote for Brady"	David Alexander	Elroy Schwartz	December 12, 1969	013
Marcia and Greg compete for class president. Partisanship overtakes the household, prompting Mike to step in and lecture the kids about unity. Greg takes this talk very seriously, particularly when his campaign manager Rusty (Stephen Liss) suggests stirring up rumors about Marcia. Greg rejects Rusty's suggestion and fires him. Marcia overhears this and realizes Greg has integrity and a sense of fair play, and decides to concede to Greg. Also, Cindy wins the position of crossing guard for a week, upsetting Bobby.
12	12	"The Voice of Christmas"	Oscar Rudolph	John Fenton Murray	December 19, 1969	015
In the show's only Christmas episode, Carol comes down with laryngitis and may not be able to sing at the holiday service. Cindy asks a department-store Santa Claus (Hal Smith) for a miracle. The older children are also depressed by Carol's illness, prompting Alice to remind them of the true meaning of the holiday. Featured Song: "O Come All Ye Faithful" sung by Florence Henderson. It was later featured in the 1988 TV film A Very Brady Christmas, sung by the whole family.
13	13	"Is There a Doctor in the House?"	Oscar Rudolph	Ruth Brooks Flippen	December 26, 1969	010
All six children have the measles. Carol calls the girls' usual doctor, a woman, Dr. Porter (Marion Ross), while Mike has called the boys' doctor, a man Dr. Cameron (Herbert Anderson), and the two debate on whose doctor to continue using. The girls prefer their usual doctor, and the boys prefer theirs, and neither group is willing to switch. Mike and Carol come to the conclusion that they can simply continue to use both doctors, and it turns out that both doctors have decided to combine their practices.
14	14	"Father of the Year"	George Cahan	Skip Webster	January 2, 1970	007
Marcia nominates Mike as "Father of the Year" in a newspaper contest, but her attempts to keep this secret result in several misunderstandings. She is first asked to do a few extra chores for being caught in Mike's den (past bedtime) where she is writing her letter for the contest. After not doing them to continue writing the secret entry, she is grounded for a week. Then when she sees the deadline for entry for the contest was the next day, she sneaks out to mail the letter. When she is caught outside well past her bedtime she is grounded from going with the family on a ski trip which was being planned in the subplot. Things are resolved when Mike is presented with the "Father of the Year" plaque and informed of how he won.
15	15	"54-40 and Fight"	Oscar Rudolph	Burt Styler	January 9, 1970	011
The girls and boys fight over 94 books of trading stamps; the boys want to redeem them for a rowboat while the girls want a sewing machine. The stamps must be used quickly as the company is going out of business, but attempts to reach a compromise fail. Carol and Mike allow a deciding competition to be held: the building of a house of cards, with the winner to decide. The girls win, but their sense of compromise wins out and they buy a portable color television set. Guest star: Herb Vigran as Harry
16	16	"Mike's Horror-Scope"	David Alexander	Ruth Brooks Flippen	January 16, 1970	016
Carol reads Mike's horoscope, which tells of a strange woman entering his life. Mike is besieged by fussy and eccentric client Beebe Gallini (Abbe Lane), the head of a cosmetics company, who monopolizes his time, which disrupts family activities. Beebe visits the Brady home and dictates impossible design specifications, but Mike ultimately loses the deal after the children's interruptions anger Beebe. Mike realizes losing the deal has saved his firm from a nervous breakdown. Guest star: Joe Ross as Duane Cartwright (uncredited)
17	17	"The Undergraduate"	Oscar Rudolph	David P. Harmon	January 23, 1970	017
Greg seems to be having trouble with math. Mike and Carol discover that Greg's "math trouble" is actually him having a crush on his math teacher, Miss Linda O'Hara (Gigi Perreau). The situation is resolved when Miss O'Hara's fiancé, Los Angeles Dodgers first baseman Wes Parker, promises Greg two tickets to the next season's opener if Greg promises to get an A in math.
18	18	"Tiger! Tiger!"	Herb Wallerstein	Elroy Schwartz	January 30, 1970	019
Bobby becomes upset when Tiger runs away, and the family searches for him. The kids all chip in money for Bobby to buy an ad and offer a reward. After the Bradys scour the neighborhood, Tiger is found at a neighbor's house, having fathered a litter of puppies. Guest stars: Maggie Malooly as Mrs. Simpson, Gary Grimes as the young man
19	19	"The Big Sprain"	Russ Mayberry	Tam Spiva	February 6, 1970	021
While Carol is away caring for her sick Aunt Mary, Alice sprains her ankle after slipping on some Chinese checkers left out by the kids. Mike punishes all the kids by saying they will undertake Alice's job until the doctor says Alice is well enough to work again. Things do not go so well at first, but improve markedly as the kids learn to cooperate.
20	20	"Brace Yourself"	Oscar Rudolph	Brad Radnitz	February 13, 1970	020
Marcia tearfully frets "I'm ugly, ugly, ugly!" over her new braces. Then her date Alan Anthony (Mike Robertson) cancels, claiming that he must go out of town with his parents to visit a relative. Greg, Mike, and Alice attempt to arrange replacement dates, but a lack of coordination ruins the plan. Then just before the night of the dance, Alan arrives ... showing off his new braces (which he had fitted after an accident with his bicycle). Guest stars: Jerry Levreau as Harold Reynolds, Brian Nash as Joey Michaelson, John Daniels as Eddie the delivery courier, Molly Dodd as the sales clerk
21	21	"The Hero"	Oscar Rudolph	Elroy Schwartz	February 20, 1970	022
Peter learns a lesson in heroism and humility after being written up as "Hero of the Month" in the local newspaper for saving a young girl's life during an accident at Driscoll's Toy Shop. Peter is so enamored with his heroics that throws himself a congratulatory party, but is humbled when no one shows up. Guest stars: Dani Nolan as Mrs. Spencer, Melanie Baker as Tina Spencer, Dave Morick as Earl Hopkins, Randy Lane as Steve, Susan Joyce as Jennifer, Iler Rasmussen as Jason, Joe Conley as the delivery courier
22	22	"The Possible Dream"	Oscar Rudolph	Al Schwartz & Bill Freedman	February 27, 1970	024
Now thanks to Cindy, Marcia's diary gets mixed in with books for a charity drive, leading the family on a frantic search. Marcia's worried someone will find out she has a crush on Desi Arnaz, Jr. To cheer Marcia up, Alice contacts Lucille Ball's housekeeper and requests that the young Arnaz pay Marcia a visit. Guest stars: Gordon Jump as Mr. Collins, Jonathan Hole as Mr. Thackery, Pat Patterson as the collection courier
23	23	"To Move or Not to Move"	Oscar Rudolph	Paul West	March 6, 1970	018
Mike considers selling the Bradys' undersized house when the children complain about a lack of room. However, the kids have second thoughts and pretend to be ghosts in order to scare off would-be buyers. The kids' efforts succeed, while Mike realizes how much the kids like the current home, even with the lack of space. Guest stars: Fran Ryan as Mrs. Hunsaker, C. Lindsay Workman as Mr. Bertram Grossman
24	24	"The Grass Is Always Greener"	George Cahan	David P. Harmon	March 13, 1970	008
Carol and Mike switch roles to see who is better at the other's household chores. Just as Carol tries teaching baseball to her sons, only to give new meaning to the word incompetence, Mike tries to help Marcia with her cooking project in order to earn a Girl Scouts cooking badge, only to be the victim of several accidents in the kitchen. Note: During the filming of this episode, Robert Reed took issue with Sherwood Schwartz's direction to slip on an egg.
25	25	"Lost Locket, Found Locket"	Norman Abbott	Charles Hoffman	March 20, 1970	023
Depressed from a lack of attention, Jan's spirits are lifted when she receives a locket from a secret admirer. But not only can't she discover who sent it, she suddenly loses it. She uses her detective skills to find it, and Alice reveals that she sent the locket; she was a middle child and often felt left out too.

=== Season 2 (1970–71) ===
No. overall	No. in season	Title	Directed by	Written by	Original release date	Prod. code
26	1	"The Dropout"	Peter Baldwin	Ben Gershman	September 25, 1970	026
After winning a baseball game, Greg's ego runs amok after a compliment from Los Angeles Dodgers pitcher Don Drysdale. When Greg decides to dedicate his whole life to the sport and forgoes any thoughts of college, even going as far as to contemplate dropping out of high school, Mike invites Drysdale over to talk about the drawbacks of life on the road, making sure Greg overhears, but this backfires as Greg accepts all potential drawbacks, still convinced professional baseball is his calling. However, Greg is sobered back to reality following a disastrous twelve-run first inning and subsequent benching in a Pony League game. Mike convinces him to just have baseball be part of his life, and not his whole life for now.
27	2	"The Babysitters"	Oscar Rudolph	Bruce Howard	October 2, 1970	028
With Alice on a date with Sam, Greg and Marcia convince Mike and Carol that they can babysit Peter, Jan, Bobby and Cindy, who starts sniffling. Carol and Mike go out to a fancy restaurant, but eventually both of them agree they need to go check on the kids, unaware that Alice is headed home as well. All the while, the kids are doing fine. Then when Carol and Mike get home, Mike trips on a bike in the backyard. Marcia and Greg hear it and call the police, worried that it may be a burglar. When the police arrive, Carol and Mike explain what had happened, while the kids watch through the window. Later, Carol and Mike go out to a movie and leave Greg and Marcia in charge. Guest stars: Gil Stuart as the maitre d', Jerry Jones as a police officer
28	3	"The Slumber Caper"	Oscar Rudolph	Tam Spiva	October 9, 1970	027
Marcia is accused by school principal J. P. Randolph (E.G. Marshall) of drawing an unflattering picture of her English teacher Mrs. Denton, who was named in an insulting remark written beneath it. Mike and Carol believe Marcia's claim that she merely copied a portrait of George Washington and never wrote Mrs. Denton's name on the drawing. They allow Marcia to have her planned slumber party but she still has to serve a week's detention at school. Marcia becomes convinced her best friend Jenny was the guilty party and "uninvites" her. The Brady boys conspire to disrupt the party and place itching powder in the girls' sleeping bags. While the girls clean up, Marcia's friend Paula (Chris Charney) admits that she found the drawing, which Marcia had left behind in her desk, and wrote the remark with the intention of no one except Marcia seeing it. Marcia realizes that in accusing Jenny she did the same thing her principal did in accusing her, and reinvites Jenny to the party. Guest stars: Hope Sherwood (daughter of Sherwood Schwartz) as Jenny Wilton, Barbara Bernstein (daughter of Florence Henderson) as Ruthie, and Carolyn Reed (daughter of Robert Reed) as Karen.
29	4	"The Un-Underground Movie"	Jack Arnold	Albert E. Lewin	October 16, 1970	030
Greg plans to make a homemade documentary film about the first Thanksgiving for a school project, starring the Bradys and Alice. The family becomes too much for Greg because of their constant complaining, but later they realize how hard they had been on Greg. They apologize and promise to do whatever Greg says, and the movie is finally made. When it is shown at school, Greg's class comments on how well it shows the Pilgrims' struggles and their refusal to return to England in spite of it, realizing a cost of freedom.
30	5	"Going, Going... Steady"	Oscar Rudolph	David P. Harmon	October 23, 1970	025
Marcia's new boyfriend Harvey Klinger is a nerdy insect collector. The family initially helps Marcia win Harvey's affection, including tutoring her on bugs. When Marcia succeeds, Carol and Mike feel uneasy about Marcia starting to "go steady".
31	6	"Call Me Irresponsible"	Hal Cooper	Bruce Howard	October 30, 1970	033
Greg wants money to buy a new car so Mike hires him as an office assistant at his architectural firm. Greg is fired on the first day after losing important blueprints at a newsstand. Mike convinces Ed Phillips to give Greg another chance, and Greg is rehired. He loses a second set of plans, but manages to find them. Note: Susan Olsen (Cindy Brady) does not appear in this episode. Guest stars: Annette Ferra as Randy Peterson, Bob Peoples as Mr. Peterson, William "Billy" Benedict as the newsstand vendor, Barbara Morrison as the drama coach, Gordon Jump as the mechanic
32	7	"The Treasure of Sierra Avenue"	Oscar Rudolph	Gwen Bagni & Paul Dubov	November 6, 1970	029
The boys discover a wallet containing $1,100 in a vacant lot. The girls want a share of the money but the boys refuse, causing tension between the groups. Mike and Carol tell the kids that they must turn the wallet in to the police. In the process, the boys learn that honesty and integrity are more important in life than "finders keepers". Guest star: Victor Kilian as Mr. Stoner
33	8	"A Fistful of Reasons"	Oscar Rudolph	Tam Spiva	November 13, 1970	035
A bully named Buddy Hinton (Russell Schulman) teases Cindy about her lisp. Peter tries to defend Cindy but backs down when Buddy challenges him to a fight. Mike tells Peter to reason with Buddy, but he instead ends up with a black eye. Mike and Carol try talking to Buddy's parents who turn out to be bullies themselves. Mike encourages Peter to defend himself, and Peter goes into training. When Peter and Cindy are again teased by Buddy the next day, Peter punches him in the mouth, loosening a tooth. Cindy teases Buddy and everyone laughs, but Peter orders them to stop for the same reason why Cindy didn't like being teased. Buddy later shows up at the Brady house in hopes of borrowing Cindy's tongue-twister book. Note: Eve Plumb (Jan Brady) does not appear in this episode. Guest stars: Paul Sorensen as Ralph Hinton, Ceil Cabot as Mrs. Hinton
34	9	"The Not-So-Ugly Duckling"	Irving J. Moore	Paul West	November 20, 1970	038
When her crush on classmate Clark Tyson (Mark Gruner) is unrequited, Jan makes up a new boyfriend named "George Glass". Her parents' suspicions are confirmed when the family's efforts to locate him for a surprise birthday party for Jan are unsuccessful. Clark tells Carol Jan doesn't wear groovy clothes, so Carol dresses Jan in a new dress and wows Clark, who barely recognizes her. Guest stars: Joseph Mell as Druggist
35	10	"The Tattle-Tale"	Russ Mayberry	Sam Locke & Milton Pascal	December 4, 1970	032
Cindy's constant tattling is becoming a problem, and her siblings start to avoid her. Things reach a head after Cindy tells Sam that Alice was hugging the mailman (John Wheeler) and Sam misinterprets it, causing tension between Alice and Sam. Alice was just very happy that a package came, which was part of the subplot where Alice was entering many contests and finally won one of them. She won a stereo system which was put in the family room and the first record the Bradys acquired was the best of Gilbert & Sullivan. Note: Christopher Knight (Peter Brady) does not appear in this episode.
36	11	"What Goes Up..."	Leslie H. Martinson	William Raynor & Myles Wilder	December 11, 1970	036
Bobby convinces Peter to let him into the treehouse. After he falls from the treehouse, Bobby becomes scared of heights, which the family tries to help him overcome. Bobby's fear is cured when he is forced to rescue his pet parakeet. Notes: Maureen McCormick (Marcia Brady) does not appear in this episode. In the trampoline scene Carol calls Peter by his portrayer's name 'Chris', and Greg calls Jan by her portrayer's name 'Eve'. Guest stars: Brian Tochi as Tommy, Sean Kelly as Tim, Jimmy Bracken as Jimmy
37	12	"Confessions, Confessions"	Russ Mayberry	Brad Radnitz	December 18, 1970	031
Peter fears he will be grounded and miss an upcoming camping trip after breaking Carol's clay vase while playing ball in the house. The other kids conspire to cover up his actions and assist in gluing the vase back together. The damage nevertheless comes to light when water leaks through the vase's glued cracks and onto the dinner table. All of the kids except Peter confess. The parents realize what has happened and decree that Peter must decide the kids' punishments, and take Peter shopping for a new lantern for his camping trip, hoping he will confess, but instead Peter takes the lantern. His conscience finally catches up with him and he admits to breaking the vase, voluntarily decides not to go camping, and does all of the chores he had handed out to the others as punishment.
38	13	"The Impractical Joker"	Oscar Rudolph	Burt Styler	January 1, 1971	034
Jan starts playing practical jokes, one of which results in the escape of Greg's science project mouse, Myron. Note: This episode sparked an argument between Reed and Schwartz over Mike's dialogue with the mouse. Final appearance of Tiger the dog.
39	14	"Where There's Smoke"	Oscar Rudolph	David P. Harmon	January 8, 1971	041
Greg is coerced by his friend Tommy Johnson to smoke, but Cindy and Jan see him and the news gets back to Mike and Carol, who call him out on it. Greg insists he didn't like it and won't smoke again, and he is let off with a warning. However, Carol sees a pack of cigarettes fall out of Greg's jacket pocket, but he does not know how they got there. Carol is consequently removed from the anti-smoking committee Tommy's mother runs. Alice later notices that the jacket is not Greg's, as his had a repaired lining tear. The jacket — and cigarettes — are revealed to be Tommy's when he pays Greg a visit to exchange jackets. Greg forces Tommy to admit the truth to Mike and Carol, and Tommy tells his mother himself. Guest stars: Bobby Cramer as Johnny, Gary Marsh as Phil, Craig Hundley as Tommy Johnson, Marie Denn as Mrs. Johnson Note: This is the first episode where Greg plays guitar and sings. The song is "Till I Met You", which Barry Williams co-wrote.
40	15	"Will the Real Jan Brady Please Stand Up?"	Peter Baldwin	Bill Freedman & Al Schwartz	January 15, 1971	042
Peter and Jan are invited to a party. Peter is reluctant to attend. Jan decides she needs a new look and buys a dark wig to stand out at the party. The plan fails when partygoers believe the ridiculous new look is Jan playing a joke, and she runs home in tears. Jan's friends show up to explain no offense was intended: they thought it was a joke because Jan's real hair is so beautiful. Guest stars: Marcia Wallace as wig store sales assistant, Pamelyn Ferdin as Lucy Winters, Karen Foulkes as Margie Whipple
41	16	"The Drummer Boy"	Oscar Rudolph	Tom & Helen August	January 22, 1971	040
Bobby is depressed after being rejected from joining the glee club, so Mike suggests a musical instrument. He chooses the drums, but his talentless efforts drive the family and the neighbors crazy. Peter is relentlessly teased because he plays football and sings for the club, and just as he is about to quit, he and the other football players learn a lesson from Los Angeles Rams defensive end Deacon Jones. Guest stars: Bart LaRue as the coach, Jimmy Bracken as Larry, Pierre Williams as Jimmy, Dennis McDougal as Freddy
42	17	"Coming-Out Party"	Oscar Rudolph	Alfred Lewis Levitt & Helen Levitt	January 29, 1971	037
Just as Mike's boss Ed Phillips (Jack Collins) invites the Brady family for an outing on his boat, Cindy comes down with tonsillitis. Dr. Howard (John Howard) thinks Cindy's tonsillectomy could be performed after the trip, but then discovers that Carol also has tonsillitis. Mike decides to postpone the trip, but it gets canceled when Carol inadvertently insults Mr. Phillips. The confusion is later resolved and the family goes on the trip. Note: Mike Lookinland (Bobby Brady) does not appear in this episode.
43	18	"Our Son, the Man"	Jack Arnold	Albert E. Lewin	February 5, 1971	043
Greg starts high school and believes he's now a man. He comes to believe he's too old for family activities, including an overnight camping trip. He wants his own room, and gets Mike's den. Greg also decides to buy a new wardrobe after meeting a senior girl who walks off with another boy in a hippie outfit. However, the senior girl he wanted to ask out for a date to a weekend movie tells him he'll be cute when he grows up. Greg realizes he still has a lot of growing up to do and goes on the family overnight camping trip. Guest stars: Julie Cobb as the senior, and Chris Beaumont as the young man, who would also appear as Eddie in season 3, episode 4, "The Wheeler Dealer"; Hank Carter in season 4, episode 23, "A Room at the Top"; and as Jerry Rogers in season 5, episode 9, "Quarterback Sneak".
44	19	"The Liberation of Marcia Brady"	Russ Mayberry	Charles Hoffman	February 12, 1971	044
At school, Marcia is approached by a television news reporter Ken Jones (playing himself in a cameo) doing a story on the women's liberation movement. Greg watches the news report and tries to rebut his sister's comments. Marcia decides to make a point by declaring that she is joining the all-male Frontier Scouts to prove she is more than capable of completing the initiation tasks. Too old to join Marcia's Sunflower Girls in attempt at retaliation, Greg enlists Peter to join in his place. While Peter's attempt to sell cookies wilts under his gross embarrassment, Marcia proves she is well suited to join the Frontier Scouts by passing all the tests. Marcia ultimately does not join; she just wanted to make her point known.
45	20	"Lights Out"	Oscar Rudolph	Bruce Howard	February 19, 1971	045
Cindy develops a fear of the dark after seeing a magician's "disappearing lady" act at a party. Peter helps Cindy deal with her fear by asking her to be his assistant for a magic act at his school's upcoming talent show. The whole thing is nearly undermined when Bobby plays a cruel joke on his sister, but Cindy shows courage when she learns that Peter's new assistant, Jan, hurt herself in gym class.
46	21	"The Winner"	Robert Reed	Elroy Schwartz	February 26, 1971	046
When Cindy comes home with a first-place jacks-playing trophy, Bobby realizes that he is the only Brady family member with no first-place trophy. He first tries entering a magazine selling contest and seems to be successful, until Cindy unwittingly reveals that Mike and Carol have asked their friends to buy subscriptions from him, Bobby quits, as he wants to win a trophy on his own. He wins a place on the Kartoon King (Hal Smith) TV show, where he takes part in an ice cream eat-off. Bobby does not win the eat-off, but his siblings throw him a surprise party and give him a first place award for trying the hardest.
47	22	"Double Parked"	Jack Arnold	Skip Webster	March 5, 1971	047
Carol leads the family in campaigning against city hall to save their neighborhood park. However, battle lines are drawn when the park may be the site of a new courthouse Mike is designing. The Bradys argue over the fate of the park. When Mike's boss Ed Phillips (Jack Collins) confronts him, he saves the day when his design moves the courthouse to a new site. Guest stars: Carolyn Stellar as Greg's school teacher, Jackie Coogan as the man
48	23	"Alice's September Song"	Oscar Rudolph	Elroy Schwartz	March 12, 1971	048
Alice's dashing former high school boyfriend, Mark Millard (Stephen Dunne), shows up at the Brady doorstep wanting to rekindle their romance. However, Mark makes a shady financial offer, and Carol and Mike have Mike's friend from the district attorney's office check Mark out, and it turns out that Mark just wanted Alice's money, as he's pulled this on several other women. When Mike and Carol start to confront Mark, he tries to escape, but hits his head on a frozen leg of lamb, that Sam the Butcher was stopping by to deliver. In the subplot, the boys and Mike are building a model airplane.
49	24	"Tell it Like it Is"	Terry Becker	Charles Hoffman	March 19, 1971	039
Carol is invited to tell her family's story for Tomorrow's Woman Magazine, but the story is rejected for being too realistic. During a second interview, Carol exaggerates her "liberation" in the hopes of getting the article published. The truth about Carol's exaggeration is revealed when the editors visit the Brady home. Guest star: Richard Simmons as Mr. Delafield.

=== Season 3 (1971–72) ===
No. overall	No. in season	Title	Directed by	Written by	Original release date	Prod. code
50	1	"Ghost Town U.S.A."	Oscar Rudolph	Howard Leeds	September 17, 1971	049
The family travels to the Grand Canyon for their third annual camping trip. On the way, they stop at a ghost town for the night. There they are confronted by an old prospector, Zachariah T. Brown (Jim Backus) who fears they plan to steal his gold, and locks them in an old jail cell. The family free themselves but Zachariah has taken their car. Greg volunteers to help his father walk 20 miles (32 km) to get back to the highway for help, but Mike says now that he has come of age, he will be responsible to help Carol and Alice when dad is not around, so instead Peter helps. The episode ends with Carol worried about Mike and Peter.
51	2	"Grand Canyon or Bust"	Oscar Rudolph	Tam Spiva	September 24, 1971	050
The family, stranded in the ghost town, seeks help by starting a signal fire. Zachariah (Jim Backus) returns with Peter, Mike, and the car. Mike has convinced Zachariah they are not stealing his claim. The family heads to the Grand Canyon. There, they ride mules down into the canyon, and Cindy and Bobby notice a Native American boy. They follow him, but get lost. The others frantically search for Cindy and Bobby.
52	3	"The Brady Braves"	Oscar Rudolph	Tam Spiva	October 1, 1971	051
When Bobby and Cindy are lost, the Indian boy reappears. He identifies himself as Jimmy, and says many stereotypes about Native Americans are untrue, such as being unable to speak English. Jimmy then leads Cindy and Bobby back to the Bradys' campsite. Mike comes to Jimmy's aid; he had run away believing his grandfather Chief Eagle Cloud (Jay Silverheels) would scoff at his ambition to become an astronaut. Mike convinces him to talk to his grandfather. Chief Eagle Cloud turns out to be proud of his grandson's ambition, and he invites the Bradys to participate in a ceremony making them honorary members of his tribe, and they each receive an Indian name: Big Eagle of Large Nest/Mike, Yellow Flower with Many Petals/Carol, Stalking Wolf/Greg, Middle Buffalo and Sleeping Lizard/Peter, Wandering Blossom/Cindy, Little Bear Who Loses Way/Bobby, Dove of Morning Light/Jan, Willow Dancing in Wind/Marcia, Squaw in Waiting/Alice.
53	4	"The Wheeler-Dealer"	Jack Arnold	Bill Freedman & Ben Gershman	October 8, 1971	053
Greg learns the principle of Caveat Emptor when he gets his driver's license and buys his first car, a 1956 Chevrolet Bel Air convertible, from a slick-talking friend. But all the restoration in the world can't change the fact the car is a lemon. Greg plans on selling the car to a gullible friend, but has a change of heart and sells it for junk instead. Guest stars: Chris Beaumont as Eddie, and Charles Martin Smith as Ronnie
54	5	"My Sister, Benedict Arnold"	Hal Cooper	Elroy Schwartz	October 15, 1971	057
Greg is furious at Marcia for dating his school rival, Warren Mulaney (Gary Rist), because Warren not only beat Greg to student class president with a phony campaign, but he knocked Greg out of first string on the basketball team, by flattering the coach. After a date with Warren, Marcia decides to not date him again, partially to keep peace with Greg. However, when Greg demands Marcia not see him again, she invites him home to spite Greg. To retaliate, Greg brings home Marcia's rival, Kathy Lawrence (Sheri Cowart), who bumped Marcia out of cheerleading tryouts. Marcia and Greg then clash over the situation, and Mike admonishes them for using Kathy and Warren to make a point. When Greg and Marcia tries to find them to apologize, they find out that Warren and Kathy have befriended each other and left together. In a subplot, Alice, Peter, Cindy and Bobby work on the dunking machine for the school carnival, each one of them taking an intentional or accidental turn at getting dunked.
55	6	"The Personality Kid"	Oscar Rudolph	Ben Starr	October 22, 1971	054
Peter is told he has no personality and takes it to heart. He tries to create a new personality, forcing different personae including an impersonation of Humphrey Bogart as Joe (repeating the family's dinner menu "pork chops and applesauce" in a Bogart like voice). None of the impersonations go over well so Peter buys a joke book. When he tries the jokes at his party everyone knows the punchlines. While trying to keep his party afloat, Bobby and Cindy—who in the subplot are on a safety drill campaign—call a surprise fire drill, forcing everyone to leave the house.
56	7	"Juliet is the Sun"	Jack Arnold	Brad Radnitz	October 29, 1971	052
Marcia wins the lead female role of Juliet Capulet in the school production of Romeo and Juliet opposite Harold Axelrod (Randy Caseas) as Romeo Montague. Peter and Jan are cast as palace guards, and rehearse their brief roles repeatedly. Marcia had auditioned for the part of the nurse and feels that she is not good enough for the lead female role. The family makes an effort to encourage Marcia, but her ego grows and she becomes unmanageable. Marcia is heartbroken when her diva-like behavior results in her dismissal from the play. At the last minute, when the girl cast as Juliet's mother Lady Capulet gets the mumps, a contrite Marcia asks to be given the role and promises she will act in a professional and courteous manner. Features Henry Mancini's song "Love Theme from Romeo and Juliet".
57	8	"And Now a Word From Our Sponsor"	Peter Baldwin	Albert E. Lewin	November 5, 1971	059
The Bradys are hired by a hip director, Skip Farnum (Paul Winchell), to star in a television commercial for laundry detergent, due to their unaffected manner. The detergent is not the family's current brand, but a comparison test shows the new detergent as superior so the family agrees to do the commercial. They take advice from acting teacher Myrna Carter (Bonnie Boland), but as a result their acting is forced. Skip is appalled and fires the Bradys, remarking that the acting methods remind him of a "terrible" actress they worked with: Myrna Carter. As compensation the family receives 2,000 boxes of laundry detergent. Note: Robert Reed wrote a four-page memo complaining to Sherwood Schwartz about the episode's premise and the character of Skip Farnum, but he did think it was a good choice to cast Paul Winchell, praising Winchell's acting.
58	9	"The Private Ear"	Hal Cooper	Michael Morris	November 12, 1971	058
Using Mike's tape recorder, Peter eavesdrops on his siblings' conversations, leading to arguments between them. Mike counsels Peter on his behavior and considers the matter settled, but Greg and Marcia take things into their own hands for revenge, and discuss a surprise party for Peter ensuring he overhears. Mike and Carol learn of this and sabotage the revenge by throwing an actual surprise party for Peter.
59	10	"Her Sister's Shadow"	Russ Mayberry	Story by : Al Schwartz & Ray Singer; Teleplay by : Al Schwartz & Phil Leslie	November 19, 1971	055
Jan is tired of her teachers constantly comparing her to the popular and successful Marcia. She dumps Marcia's awards in the closet and complains that all she hears is "Marcia this, Marcia that... Marcia, Marcia, Marcia". Jan tries out for the pom-pom squad but fails. Jan is thrilled to establish her own successful identity by winning an Honor award for an essay she wrote. When she realizes there is a scoring error and she actually came second, Jan grapples with her conscience and considers keeping secret her discovery. At assembly with her parents in attendance and minutes before the presentation, Jan reveals her discovery to her teacher. The teacher announces the rightful winner, but then praises Jan for being mature and doing the right and honorable thing.
60	11	"Click"	Oscar Rudolph	Alfred Lewis Levitt & Helen Levitt (as Tom & Helen August)	November 26, 1971	060
Greg becomes a member of the Westdale High School football team. Mike supports the idea, but Carol fears Greg will get hurt. Greg is indeed injured in a scrimmage so he turns to photography. Greg realizes his importance when he snaps a photo of a bad call on the field. Bobby also takes up photography for the subplot. Guest stars: Elvera Roussel as Linette Carter, Bart LaRue as the coach
61	12	"Getting Davy Jones"	Oscar Rudolph	Phil Leslie & Al Schwartz	December 10, 1971	061
Marcia, president of her school's Davy Jones fan club, hastily promises she can get him to sing at her school's upcoming dance on the strength of Jones' letter saying he would do her a favor. Marcia scrambles to contact Jones to ask him to appear. After unsuccessful attempts at the local TV station and at his hotel, Marcia appeals to Davy's manager, who brushes her off as a lovesick fan. However, this is overheard by Davy himself. When he realizes he did write that letter promising a favor "if he is ever in her town", he knows he cannot go back on his word. Guest stars: Marcia Wallace as Mrs. Robbins, Tina Andrews as Doreen, Whitney Rydbeck as Page, Kimberly Beck as Laura, and Britt Leach as the recordings manager. The actors who play the receptionist and the audio technician are uncredited. Notes: This was Davy Jones' first televised appearance after the end of The Monkees; his song featured in this episode, "Girl", was also used as the theme to the Paramount picture Star Spangled Girl, which was released in theaters the same month as this episode's original broadcast. In 1997, TV Guide ranked the episode number 37 on its '100 Greatest Episodes of All Time' list.
62	13	"The Not-So-Rose-Colored Glasses"	Leslie H. Martinson	Bruce Howard	December 24, 1971	063
Jan accidentally takes someone else's bicycle and her grades are falling. It is learned her eyesight is failing and she needs glasses – which she refuses to wear. She bicycles without her glasses, but crashes her bike destroying the portrait of the kids Mike intended as an anniversary present for Carol. Jan tells the kids the photographer lost the negative and they have to be photographed again for the replacement portrait. Mike realizes it is a new photograph – Jan wears her glasses in the new portrait. Jan says she was not wearing her glasses at the time of her accident and that she sold her bicycle to pay for the replacement portrait. In the subplot, Carol and Mike are trying to hide anniversary presents from each other. Guest star: Robert Nadder as Gregory Gaylord
63	14	"The Teeter-Totter Caper"	Russ Mayberry	Joel Kane & Jack Lloyd	December 31, 1971	056
When Bobby and Cindy are not invited to Carol's cousin's wedding and instead are asked to stay out of the way of their older siblings' activities, they decide to show how "important" they are by setting a world record for hours spent on a seesaw. They get newspaper coverage for their attempt, which ultimately fails when they fall asleep short of the record. They then learn that they set a record for kids around their age. The older siblings realize the attention-craving Bobby and Cindy indeed have their place in the family and are worthy of respect. In the subplot, the older Bradys are planning for the wedding.
64	15	"Big Little Man"	Robert Reed	Skip Webster	January 7, 1972	062
Bobby is self-conscious about his diminutive height. Greg, in the subplot, gets a job at Sam's butcher shop to save for a surfboard. The girls' attempts to convince Bobby he is growing do not help, but Bobby learns the value of being small when he locks himself and Greg in Sam's meat locker.
65	16	"Dough Re Mi"	Allen Baron	Ben Starr	January 14, 1972	064
Greg needs $150 to cut a record. To get the money Greg forms a singing group with his siblings, but Peter's voice begins to change. Greg comes up with a new song to accommodate his cracking voice. Two songs are featured: "We Can Make the World a Whole Lot Brighter" and "Time to Change".
66	17	"Jan's Aunt Jenny"	Hal Cooper	Michael Morris	January 21, 1972	070
Jan discovers an old photograph of a child that looks just like her. Carol explains it is Aunt Jenny (Imogene Coca) and describes her to Jan. Jan is anxious to meet her great-aunt, but changes her attitude on seeing a current photo of Jenny. Jan worries she will resemble the old and eccentric-looking Jenny at that age. Jan's doubt is placated when she meets Aunt Jenny, a fun-loving Auntie Mame-type, and realizes her beauty within. The subplot has the Bradys cleaning junk from the attic and Mike attempting to restore an old record player.
67	18	"The Big Bet"	Earl Bellamy	Elroy Schwartz	January 28, 1972	065
Greg comments to a pesky Bobby that he can do twice as many chin-ups as he can. Greg did not mean anything by it, but Bobby demands a contest, with the loser acting as the winner's servant for a week. Bobby wins and soon becomes a tyrant. He invites himself along on Greg's date with Rachel (Hope Sherwood). Bobby is annoying and disruptive through the date, and through his intentionally silly antics rips the soft top of Mike's convertible, leaving himself with a large debt to Mike for the repairs. In the subplot, Carol and Mike attend a high-school reunion with a bet of their own.
68	19	"The Power of the Press"	Jack Arnold	Ben Gershman & Bill Freedman	February 4, 1972	067
Peter joins his school newspaper and becomes popular when his classmates see themselves mentioned in print. Peter writes a flattering piece on his officious science teacher Mr. Price (Milton Parsons), hoping it will help him gain a better grade. After the test Peter admits what he has done to Mr. Price, not realizing that he has read the piece – standard procedure when staff are mentioned in the paper. They both learn something from the discussion.
69	20	"Sergeant Emma"	Jack Arnold	Harry Winkler	February 11, 1972	068
When Alice goes on a week's vacation, she invites her identical cousin Emma (Ann B. Davis), a former Army WAC, to care for the household. Emma starts the Brady kids on a rigid schedule of exercise and work. When Mike and Carol approach Emma to commend her for teaching discipline to the kids, Emma decides that they too should join the sessions. Everyone can't wait until Alice returns from her vacation, and a "welcome home" party intended for Alice is misconstrued by Emma as the Bradys' show of appreciation.
70	21	"Cindy Brady, Lady"	Hal Cooper	Al Schwartz & Larry Rhine	February 18, 1972	066
When she can't do what her older sisters can, Cindy decides to act more mature than her age. Bobby tries to help by posing as a secret admirer; when Mike wants to expose him, Bobby asks his friend Tommy (Eric Shea) to reveal himself as the admirer. Cindy initially turns Tommy off with her mature airs, but then when she starts acting her age Tommy expresses true affection for her.
71	22	"My Fair Opponent"	Peter Baldwin	Bernie Kahn	March 3, 1972	071
Marcia's plain Jane classmate Molly Webber (Debi Storm) is nominated for hostess of the school's Banquet Night as a cruel joke by other students. Marcia is angered by this, so decides to make over Molly to deflate the joke. Marcia is in a bind when a nominee drops out and Marcia becomes the other nominee. She considers dropping out herself until experiencing Molly's arrogant new behavior. Molly uses Marcia's campaign speech without acknowledging Marcia for her help, and with it, wins the contest. Molly has a change of heart and confesses.
72	23	"The Fender Benders"	Allen Baron	David P. Harmon	March 10, 1972	069
Carol is involved in a minor car accident with Marcia, Bobby, and Cindy as passengers. Carol and Harry Duggan (Jackie Coogan), the other driver involved, initially agree to pay for their own damage. Duggan later files a lawsuit against Carol, claiming the accident was due to her reckless driving and that he was injured as a result. Carol goes to court to dispute the exaggerated charges, and wins with a big assist from Mike. Guest stars: Robert Emhardt as the judge

=== Season 4 (1972–73) ===
No. overall	No. in season	Title	Directed by	Written by	Original release date	Prod. code
73	1	"Hawaii Bound"	Jack Arnold	Tam Spiva	September 22, 1972	072
Mike is sent to Hawaii to check on a construction project, and his firm allows him to take the family and Alice along. The family then enjoys a tour of Hawaii before Mike visits the jobsite. When Bobby joins his father on the tour of the construction project, he stumbles upon an ancient tiki which, according to an old Hawaiian legend, brings bad luck to anyone who touches it. The Brady boys laugh at the curse and blow it off as superstition, but then start to think differently when Greg has a surfing accident. During their sightseeing tour of Hawaii, the Bradys learn about the history of Pearl Harbor, and Cindy is pleased to have legendary Hawaiian crooner Don Ho and Sam Kapu serenade her. Guest Stars: David "Lippy" Espinda as Mr. Hanalei, Patrick Adiarte as David, Don Ho as himself
74	2	"Pass the Tabu"	Jack Arnold	Tam Spiva	September 29, 1972	073
The tiki apparently brings continued bad luck to the family: Greg is reeling from his surfing crash, a wall ornament hanging in the boys' hotel room falls and nearly hits Bobby, and a tarantula finds its way into their room and nearly bites Peter. Bobby tries to get rid of the tiki, but it is returned to him by an unknowing Jan. The boys then learn that the idol must be discarded at an ancient burial ground in order for the curse to be removed. Guest star: Vincent Price as Professor Hubert Whitehead
75	3	"The Tiki Caves"	Jack Arnold	Tam Spiva	October 6, 1972	074
An archaeologist, believing the boys have come to steal his latest "find", holds them captive on the burial grounds where they are directed to return the tiki. After the girls reveal their siblings' whereabouts, Mike rescues his sons, then convinces the professor that they have no intention of claiming credit for finding the burial grounds. A Hawaiian luau party that evening wraps up the Bradys' latest vacation.
76	4	"Today, I Am a Freshman"	Hal Cooper	Myles Wilder	October 13, 1972	075
Marcia is anxious about her freshman year of high school, and Mike asks Greg to introduce his sister around. Marcia decides to join every club at school, including the Boosters, a club of conceited girls who administer strict social rules. When Marcia invites the Boosters over for her interview, Peter's previously malfunctioning science project model volcano, which is the subplot, finally erupts, spewing "lava" over Marcia and the outraged Boosters. Marcia breaks into laughter and realizes the humorless Boosters are not the types of girls she wants to socialize with. She subsequently quits all the other clubs, except for ceramics, the only one she truly wanted to be in.
77	5	"Cyrano de Brady"	Hal Cooper	Skip Webster	October 20, 1972	076
Peter is smitten when Jan brings home her pretty classmate Kerry Hathaway (Kym Karath). Peter is shy with Kerry, so he enlists Greg to help with what to say to Kerry. Kerry mistakenly concludes that Greg is the one interested in her, which causes friction between Greg and Peter. To make it up to Peter, Greg enlists Marcia's help in a play-act to convince Kerry that he is an aggressive, womanizing playboy so she will lose interest in him. Peter arrives home and, unaware of the plan, tells Kerry that "Debbie" (Marcia) is their sister, and that it was an act. Peter's honesty wins Kerry's love.
78	6	"Fright Night"	Jerry London	Brad Radnitz	October 27, 1972	077
After being spooked by the boys one night, the girls work on their own method of revenge. Once the score is evened, Mike calls for an end to the pranks. Regardless, the kids team up to scare Alice, after she claims to be afraid of nothing. Mike and Carol arrive home early and break up the scheme, but Alice arrives on the scene. Panicked, Alice smashes the bust of Mike that Carol made for an art contest, which was the subplot, thinking it is the head of a burglar. Carol and Mike come down hard on the kids and suspend the kids' allowances for two weeks, pointing out that their actions could have resulted in tragedy.
79	7	"The Show Must Go On??"	Jack Donohue	Harry Winkler	November 3, 1972	081
Greg and Marcia each enlist their parents to perform with them in the Westdale High School's talent revue, Family Night Frolics. Carol and Marcia perform the featured song "Together (Wherever We Go)" from the musical Gypsy, and Greg and Mike do a reading of Henry Wadsworth Longfellow's The Day is Done. The reading is a unique interpretation complete with visual gags, bad puns, and a rubber chicken. In the subplot, Alice and Sam (Allan Melvin) break up, but solve their differences during the talent revue. Guest stars: Barbara Morrison as Mrs. Tuttle, Karen Foulkes as Muriel. Frank De Vol, who was the musical director of the series, made a cameo appearance as the dad playing the saxophone during the talent revue.
80	8	"Jan, the Only Child"	Roger Duchowny	Ralph Goodman & Al Schwartz	November 10, 1972	080
Jan complains about the lack of privacy and personal space, and declares she wants to become an only child. Her angered siblings teach her a lesson; they grant her wish by ignoring her and staying out of her way. Meanwhile in the subplot, the family plans a square dance at a Hoedown party, and Alice and Carol compete by making strawberry preserves for the dance. Note: This episode caused an argument on-set between Robert Reed and Sherwood Schwartz over lines in the script, particularly a line about Mike remarking on how the kitchen smells like "Strawberry heaven", to which Reed insisted cooked strawberries don't have any odor.
81	9	"Career Fever"	Jerry London	Adele Styler & Burt Styler	November 17, 1972	078
Mike mistakenly believes Greg wants to follow in his father's footsteps to become an architect. Greg does not want to offend Mike by admitting he does not want to become an architect, he merely wrote that he did for a school assignment. Greg creates ridiculous designs to show he will never make it as an architect. In the subplot, Cindy wants to be a model, Bobby an astronaut, while Peter and Jan want to go into the medical profession and borrow large medical encyclopedias from the library. Peter mistakenly concludes that he has contracted a rare disease, but he has misread the encyclopedia.
82	10	"Goodbye, Alice, Hello"	George Tyne	Milt Rosen	November 24, 1972	083
A series of misunderstandings leads Alice to believe she has irreparably breached the Brady kids' trust, prompting her resignation. Alice's temporary replacement is Kay (Mary Treen), Alice's friend who had a similar unpleasant experience with another family. Although Kay is very nice, she has no intentions of bonding with the family; instead she does her job. The kids, with help from Kay, track down Alice at a restaurant where she now works and convince her to return. Notes: Robert Reed does not appear in this episode. This episode includes the scene of Bobby and Cindy wanting to go skinny dipping at a new neighbor's pool.
83	11	"Greg's Triangle"	Richard Michaels	Bill Freedman & Ben Gershman	December 8, 1972	086
Greg dates classmate Jennifer Nichols (Tannis G. Montgomery), whom Carol and Mike suspect has an ulterior motive: she and Marcia are trying out for head cheerleader, and Greg is on the judging committee. At the tryout, Greg is caught in a dilemma when he must cast the deciding vote; he fears both Jennifer and Marcia will be angered if he does not favor them. Ultimately he selects Pat Conway (Rita Wilson) because he thought she was the best cheerleader. To his surprise Marcia is happy; she knows Greg voted honestly, but Jennifer dumps Greg, and he realizes she was just using him to win his vote. In the subplot, Carol takes up golf with Mike's help. Note: Although Carol is learning how to play golf, it is revealed in the first season episode "Vote For Brady" that she has a set of clubs and used to play golf all the time.
84	12	"Everyone Can't Be George Washington"	Richard Michaels	Sam Locke & Milton Pascal	December 22, 1972	085
Peter auditions for the role of George Washington in the school play, but is cast as Benedict Arnold instead. When friends start teasing him as a "traitor", Peter feigns laryngitis to lose the role, but Mike convinces him his behavior in letting everyone down was the same as the real Benedict Arnold. Peter agrees to be in the play and is praised for his brilliant portrayal of Arnold. Guest star: Sara Seegar as Miss Bailey. Also, Florence Henderson's oldest daughter, Barbara Bernstein, portrays a student cast in the school play as Benedict Arnold's wife Peggy.
85	13	"Love and the Older Man"	Richard Michaels	Sam Locke & Milton Pascal	January 5, 1973	084
Marcia has a crush on the family's new dentist, Dr. Stanley Vogel (Don Brit Reid), and mistakenly concludes that a favor he plans to ask of her is to date him. He actually wants to ask Marcia to babysit his three-year-old child when he takes his wife out. In a subplot, the boys build a motorized go-cart.
86	14	"Law and Disorder"	Hal Cooper	Elroy Schwartz	January 12, 1973	079
Bobby learns about power, discretion, and responsibility when he is named safety monitor at school (involuntarily). His classmates avoid him, and when he writes up Cindy for running in the hallway and gets her a detention, she gets mad at him. Bobby still abuses his power and writes people up for minor infractions, including his older siblings. Bobby learns his lesson when he breaks the rules himself to save a classmate's cat from an abandoned house. In the subplot other family members restore an old sailboat. Note: Barry Williams admitted to being stoned in the scene where he is pumping up the bike tire.
87	15	"Greg Gets Grounded"	Jack Arnold	Elroy Schwartz	January 19, 1973	089
Mike prohibits Greg from driving the family car for a week after Bobby describes his near-accident on the freeway. Greg then borrows a car from his friend George Thompson to buy tickets to a rock concert before they sell out. When Greg's parents call him on it, he states that he was complying with the letter of the punishment, by not driving "the family car". Greg is grounded from leaving home for ten days, except for school. Greg convinces his parents to abolish the punishment on the condition he does everything by "his exact words". They make Greg fulfill all his commitments to the letter, to teach him a lesson. In the subplot, Peter and Bobby train their pet frogs for a frog jumping contest, one of whom interrupts Greg's date with Rachel. Guest star: Hope Sherwood (Sherwood Schwartz's daughter) in her second appearance as Rachel. Note: This is the second of two episodes to not have an epilogue, after the pilot episode "The Honeymoon".
88	16	"Amateur Nite"	Jack Arnold	Sam Locke & Milton Pascal	January 26, 1973	092
Jan's misunderstanding of the price for the engraving of a silver platter they intend to give their parents as an anniversary gift leaves the kids scrambling for cash. To raise the funds they participate in television talent show as "The Silver Platters". Guest stars: Steve Dunne (in his second appearance, having previously played Mark Millard on season two's "Alice's September Song") as Pete Sterne, Robert Nadder as Alfred Baily, and Harold Peary as Mr. Goodbody. Featured songs: "It's a Sunshine Day" and "Keep On", sung by the Brady Kids
89	17	"Bobby's Hero"	Leslie H. Martinson	Michael Morris	February 2, 1973	087
When Mike and Carol learn that Bobby's hero is Jesse James, they set out to teach him the truth about the outlaw. When books and censored movies on TV suggest to Bobby that James was not a villain, Mike tracks down a relative of one of James' victims to share his story with Bobby. That, plus a nightmare in which Jesse James kills the Bradys during a train robbery, finally gets through to Bobby. Meanwhile, Mike has to write a speech about ancient architecture for modern buildings for a convention. Guest stars: Burt Mustin as Jethroe Collins, Gordon DeVol as Jesse James
90	18	"The Subject Was Noses"	Jack Arnold	Larry Rhine & Al Schwartz	February 9, 1973	090
Marcia is asked out by popular school hunk Doug Simpson (Nicholas Hammond). Marcia is so taken aback by the gesture that she instantly accepts the date without realizing that she has a date with Charley (Stuart Getz), the nice but average Joe son of a wallpaper salesman, for the same night, creating a conflict. So taking Greg's advice, Marcia breaks her date with Charley, using the excuse "something suddenly came up". Later, when Peter's wildly-thrown football hits Marcia's nose, badly injuring it ("Oh, my nose!"), Doug breaks their date, using the same excuse. After Marcia's nose quickly heals, Doug asks her out again. Marcia rejects him, admits to Charley what she did, and reaccepts the date with him. When Marcia returns home, she reveals to Mike and Carol that during the date she and Charley crossed paths with Doug, who teased her, and Charley rushed to her defense. The two boys then got into a fight, and Charley punched Doug in the nose, leaving it swollen like Marcia's had been. In a subplot, Mike and Carol mull over what wallpaper pattern to decorate their bedroom with. Guest stars: Lisa Eilbacher as Vicki In 2009, TV Guide ranked this episode at the bottom of its list of the 100 Greatest Episodes.
91	19	"How to Succeed in Business?"	Robert Reed	Gene Thompson	February 23, 1973	091
Peter gets his first job as a bicycle mechanic. His painfully slow process repairing a bicycle irritates his boss, Mr. Martinelli (Jay Novello). Martinelli fires him for his plodding pace; he explains that Peter is "very nice" but just not "mechanically inclined". Peter keeps the truth from his family and takes refuge in the park until Carol and Mike visit the shop to purchase bicycles. They console Peter; Mike explains that he has lost jobs.
92	20	"The Great Earring Caper"	Leslie H. Martinson	Larry Rhine & Al Schwartz	March 2, 1973	088
Cindy takes a pair of earrings Carol loaned to Marcia, and loses them. Cindy enlists budding detective Peter to help find the jewelry before Marcia or Carol find out. The pressure is on when Carol wants to wear them to a costume party (the planning of which is the subplot) where she and Mike plan to dress as Antony and Cleopatra. When the truth comes out the family reconstructs the events before Cindy lost the earrings, and find them in the washing machine – damaged.
93	21	"You're Never Too Old"	Bruce Bilson	Ben Gershman & Bill Freedman	March 9, 1973	093
The kids try to set up the girls' matrilineal great-grandmother, Grandma Connie Hutchins (Florence Henderson), and the boys' patrilineal great-grandfather, Grandpa Hank Brady (Robert Reed), after the two come for a visit. While Grandma is a real "swinger", Grandpa is a real "stick in the mud". After some problems, Grandma Hutchins finally wins over Grandpa Brady, and the two elope in Las Vegas.
94	22	"You Can't Win Them All"	Jack Donohue	Lois Hire	March 16, 1973	082
Bobby and Cindy vie for a spot on a kids' television quiz show Question the Kids with host Monty Marshall (Edward Knight, Christopher Knight's father). Cindy earns her spot, and gains a huge ego as a result, but blanks when the cameras start rolling. In the subplot, Mike and Carol plan a barbecue dinner party which becomes a Mexican feast and then a smorgasbord, changing dates several times without a resolution.
95	23	"A Room at the Top"	Lloyd J. Schwartz	William Raynor & Myles Wilder	March 23, 1973	094
Greg and Marcia each want to convert the newly cleared attic into their own room. Greg is ultimately given the room as the oldest of the children, but relinquishes it to Marcia after hearing her tearful pleas for privacy from her sisters. An annoyed Bobby and Peter — wanting to keep their room to themselves —conspire to frustrate Marcia enough to have her relinquish the room. Marcia initially accuses Greg of the shenanigans, but they soon realize what is happening. Marcia reasons she will have her opportunity to take the room when Greg leaves for college so gives him the room. Guest star: Chris Beaumont as Hank Carter Note: In "Our Son, the Man" in season two, Mike tells Carol that the attic would be suitable for Greg if only he were two and a half feet (76 m) tall.

=== Season 5 (1973–74) ===
No. overall	No. in season	Title	Directed by	Written by	Original release date	Prod. code
96	1	"Adios, Johnny Bravo"	Jerry London	Joanna Lee	September 14, 1973	098
After the Brady kids perform a song together, slick-talking talent scout Tami Cutler (Claudia Jennings) wants to sign Greg to a solo recording contract and make him over into a singer named Johnny Bravo. Greg alienates his siblings in pursuing this, and upsets his parents when he announces plans to postpone college. Greg anticipates solo stardom, but when he discovers his recordings have been electronically "sweetened", confronts Tami. Tami and her associate admit they liked Greg only because he "fit the suit", prompting Greg to walk out. Guest stars: Jeff Davis as Hal Barton, Paul Cavonis as Buddy Berkman Featured songs: "You've Got To Be In Love To Love a Love Song", "Good Time Music"
97	2	"Mail Order Hero"	Bruce Bilson	Martin Ragaway	September 21, 1973	096
Discovering the New York Jets will be playing in town, Bobby boasts to his friends that he personally knows their quarterback Joe Namath. When Bobby's friends demand he back his words, Cindy secretly helps to arrange Namath's visit, by writing the star quarterback and claiming that Bobby is deathly ill.
98	3	"Snow White and the Seven Bradys"	Bruce Bilson	Ben Starr	September 28, 1973	095
At Cindy's behest the family and Sam (Allan Melvin) put on a backyard theater production of "Snow White and the Seven Dwarfs" to raise funds for a retirement gift for Cindy's popular teacher Mrs. Whitfield (Frances Whitfield). When it is discovered Alice has already eaten the "poisoned apple" while rehearsing, Sam and Mike rush to the store (in costume) to buy an apple. Sam receives a parking fine, and the policeman says they must have a permit to host the production. A permit is granted on short notice allowing the show to go on. Note: The cast of the production is 'Snow White' played by Carol, 'Prince Charming' played by Mike, 'Dopey' played by Sam, 'Doc' played by Greg, 'Sneezy' played by Peter, 'Sleepy' played by Marcia, 'Happy' played by Jan, 'Bashful' played by Bobby, 'Grumpy' played by Cindy, and 'the wicked queen' played by Alice.
99	4	"Never Too Young"	Richard Michaels	Larry Rhine & Al Schwartz	October 5, 1973	099
After defending one of Cindy's friends at school, Bobby receives his first kiss. However, his new girlfriend Millicent (Melissa Sue Anderson) warns him that she may have the mumps. Bobby is worried he may jeopardize the Roaring Twenties party, which is the subplot, being organized by the family, by infecting everyone.
100	5	"Peter and the Wolf"	Leslie H. Martinson	Tam Spiva	October 12, 1973	100
Greg's date Sandra (Cindi Crosby) cancels when her cousin Linda (Kathie Gibboney) visits from out of town. Wanting to salvage the date, Greg plans a double date. When no one wants to pair up with Linda, he turns to Peter, passing him off as a "friend" in his high school class named "Phil Packer". Linda and Sandra discover Greg's ruse but do not let on, and hatch a plan of revenge at a pizza parlor. In the subplot, Carol and Mike – on Jan's and Marcia's recommendations for great pizza – are entertaining a conservative client Juan Calderon and his wife Maria there. Sandra and Linda's revenge nearly jeopardizes Mike's deal.
101	6	"Getting Greg's Goat"	Robert Reed	Sam Locke & Milton Pascal	October 19, 1973	101
Greg is involved in the heist of a rival school's mascot (a goat named Raquel) in retaliation for the stealing of Westdale's mascot (a bear cub). Greg hides Raquel in his attic room, but this leads to a series of misunderstandings (notably when Mike thinks that Greg is keeping a girl in his room). Mike finds out about Raquel and suggests to Greg to set up a secret exchange of mascots with the other school. A last minute PTA meeting at the Brady house ruins their plans, and they must hide Raquel from the group. They are eventually caught, and Greg's vice principal Mr. Binkley orders Greg to write a 5,000-word report on mascot stealing. Mike reveals he had stolen a rival high school's mascot when he was in high school, and he had been suspended for a week. (And Mr. Binkley had been suspended for a month for it). Guest stars: Sandra Gould as Mrs. Gould, Margarita Cordova as the PTA member, George D. Wallace as Mr. Binkley
102	7	"Marcia Gets Creamed"	Peter Baldwin	Bill Freedman & Ben Gershman	October 26, 1973	104
Marcia gets a job at a local ice cream shop, while Peter is distraught that he cannot find a job. When her boss Mr. Haskell (Henry Corden) wants to start taking afternoons off, he puts Marcia in charge and hires Peter, but Peter's chronic slacking and incompetence prompts Marcia to fire him and she in turn hires Jan as a replacement. Eventually, Mr. Haskell realizes he is happier running the shop than he is taking afternoons off, and lets Marcia go, keeping the harder-working Jan over Marcia. Guest stars: Michael Gray as Jeff, Kimberly Beck as Jeff's unnamed replacement date.
103	8	"My Brother's Keeper"	Ross Bowman	Michael Morris	November 2, 1973	105
Bobby saves Peter from being struck by a falling ladder in their backyard. Peter, grateful to Bobby for saving his life, offers to become Bobby's "servant for life". Bobby takes advantage of the situation, forcing Peter to do all Bobby's chores. Peter soon regrets his offer, and breaks the pledge. The feud between Peter and Bobby causes Peter to tape a line across the middle of their shared bedroom; Bobby emphasizes that the bathroom is on his side by going in and flushing the toilet. Bobby is later accidentally locked in their bedroom closet; Peter arrives and opens the door, rescuing him. To resolve the dispute, Bobby effusively praises Peter for this supposedly heroic, life saving rescue. In the subplot, the girls' room is being wallpapered. Note: Although no toilets are ever shown in the Brady residence, one is heard being flushed for the only time in this episode.
104	9	"Quarterback Sneak"	Peter Baldwin	Bill Freedman & Ben Gershman	November 9, 1973	103
Greg's rival high school quarterback Jerry Rogers (Chris Beaumont) feigns interest in Marcia, but only to gain access to the Westdale High School football team's playbook. Greg tries to warn a lovestruck Marcia about Jerry, much to her angered disbelief, and Bobby backs Greg's story when he sees Jerry try to steal the playbook. Greg then devises a phony playbook and convinces Marcia to invite Jerry over for a visit. Marcia then discovers Jerry's true intentions and becomes crushed. Mike then informs Greg that his deception was just as dishonest as Jerry's stealing the playbook, which prompts Greg to call Jerry to right the wrongs, although Jerry does not believe him. It is then revealed that during the game, Jerry's coach learns that he stole the phony playbook and benches him early in the game, allowing Westdale to win easily, 20-7. In the subplot, Carol is paid an unexpected visit by her egotistical high school sweetheart, Tank Gates (Denny Miller).
105	10	"Try, Try Again"	George Tyne	Larry Rhine & Al Schwartz	November 16, 1973	106
When she finds she simply has no talent as a ballet dancer, Jan tries to find something she is good at. She tries tap dancing and acting, but fails at both. However, while "acting" as a painter, one of Jan's teachers (Judy Landon) realizes her artistic talent, and Jan finds her niche as a painter. In a subplot, Mike cooks a gourmet dinner for the family. Note: Eve Plumb has a second career as a painter.
106	11	"The Cincinnati Kids"	Leslie H. Martinson	Larry Rhine & Al Schwartz	November 23, 1973	102
Mike hopes to win his company a contract with Kings Island amusement park in Mason, Ohio (near Cincinnati) by designing a new roller coaster for them. He decides to make a vacation of it by treating Alice and his entire family to a weekend at the park. The hopes are jeopardized when Jan and Marcia get Mike's tubes of blueprints confused, leaving Mike with Jan's poster of Yogi Bear at the meeting. When Jan finds the tubes with the blueprints, the entire family scrambles to hand the blueprints to each other in a relay race to get to the park's entrance to catch Mike and the park's board of directors, who planned to leave by 1 P.M. to catch a plane. Guest stars: Hilary Thompson as Marge, Bob Hoffman as the attendant, L. Jeffery Schwartz as the bear Note: This episode was filmed on location at the then-new Kings Island amusement park 25 miles (40 km) north of Cincinnati, Ohio.
107	12	"The Elopement"	Jerry London	Harry Winkler	December 7, 1973	097
When Jan and Marcia overhear Alice and Sam discussing elopement, they mistakenly believe they plan to elope. The family prepares a wedding reception, while Carol begins interviewing a replacement housekeeper for Alice's honeymoon. Sam (Allan Melvin) and Alice were actually discussing a cousin's elopement, and reveal the misunderstanding at the reception. In the subplot, Bobby is trying to learn to play the organ on an old portable. Note: At the end of the episode Alice announces to Carol and Mike that she and Sam are engaged. There is no subsequent mention of a wedding in the series. In the 1981 movie The Brady Girls Get Married, Alice reveals that she and Sam have been married for 3 1/2 years.
108	13	"Miss Popularity"	Jack Donohue	Martin Ragaway	December 21, 1973	108
To win the title of her school's Most Popular Girl competition, Jan makes a host of promises to her friends. She wins the competition but fails to make good on the promises and becomes an insufferable snob. Realizing she is losing her friends, Jan sets out to right her wrongs. Meanwhile Carol and Mike try to plan a second honeymoon. Guest stars: Jerelyn Fields as Shirley, Darryl Seman as Herman
109	14	"Kelly's Kids"	Richard Michaels	Sherwood Schwartz	January 4, 1974	107
Ken (Ken Berry) and Kathy Kelly (Brooke Bundy), friends of Carol and Mike, plan to adopt a boy named Matt (Todd Lookinland, Mike Lookinland's brother) from a local orphanage. By chance they also adopt Matt's two best friends: Dwayne (William Attmore II), an African American and Steve (Carey Wong), who is Asian, much to the chagrin of the Kelly family's bigoted neighbor Mrs. Payne (Molly Dodd). Notes: This is the only episode other than the pilot episode, "The Honeymoon", credited to Sherwood Schwartz. It is a backdoor pilot for a planned series that was never produced. Sherwood Schwartz used the concept for Together We Stand in 1986, which would later relaunch as Nothing Is Easy in 1987.
110	15	"The Driver's Seat"	Jack Arnold	George Tibbles	January 11, 1974	109
After a nervous non-start at her first driver's examination, Marcia gets her license on her second try, and is soon engaged in a debate with Greg over which gender has the better driving abilities. To put their argument to rest, Mike creates a driving course for them both to run. Greg gets overanxious and loses to Marcia. In the end, Bobby and Cindy attempt to make a similar contest in bike-riding, but after seeing Greg suffering, Bobby backs out of it. In the subplot, Jan is preparing for a crucial debate on her debate team. Nervous about presenting in front of people, Mike gives her the advice to picture them in their underwear. Guest star: Herb Vigran as the examiner
111	16	"Out of This World"	Peter Baldwin	Larry Rhine & Al Schwartz	January 18, 1974	110
After meeting astronaut Brigadier General James McDivitt, Bobby and Peter are convinced that they have seen a UFO hover above their backyard then disappear, but it is only Greg playing a practical joke on them. Bobby and Peter tell the family and everyone at school about the "UFO". No one at school believes them so they seek proof by camping in the yard with a camera. The "UFO" reappears as they both start taking photos. Bobby later dreams about a UFO landing in the backyard with space aliens Herlo (Frank Delfino) and Shim (Sadie Delfino) emerging and interacting with him. Mike shows the developed "UFO" photos to the Air Force who send Captain James McGregor (James Flavin) of the local police force to investigate. Greg is forced to admit to the truth and loses use of the car for the weekend as punishment. Note: Frank Delfino had previously been Mike Lookinland's stunt double, and Sadie Delfino had previously been Susan Olsen's stunt double, before the kids grew too big. The obvious cut on Greg's lip, explained as a shaving accident in this episode, was actually the result of a traffic accident Barry Williams was involved in.
112	17	"Welcome Aboard"	Richard Michaels	Larry Rhine & Al Schwartz	January 25, 1974	111
Carol's nephew, Oliver (Robbie Rist), comes to live with the Bradys while his parents are in South America. He nearly wears out his welcome when he is involved in a series of minor accidents in his eagerness to help out. Oliver is convinced he is a jinx until his presence wins the family an award during a visit to a movie studio. Their prize is an appearance in a 1920s-style slapstick movie.
113	18	"Two Petes in a Pod"	Richard Michaels	Sam Locke & Milton Pascal	February 8, 1974	112
Peter meets Arthur Owens (Christopher Knight), an exact "double" of his with glasses, at school after making a date with a girl named Michelle (Kathy O'Dare). When Arthur makes a date with Pamela (Denise Nickerson) (a niece of Mike's boss Ed Phillips) while masquerading as Peter as a gag, Peter must enlist Arthur's help to avoid breaking either date. Carol and Mike catch on, but Pamela is actually attracted to Arthur, and Michelle is finally attracted to Peter.
114	19	"Top Secret"	Bernard Wiesen	Howard Ostroff	February 15, 1974	115
Bobby and Oliver (Robbie Rist) jump to all sorts of conclusions when Mike is visited by Fred Sanders (Don Fenwick), an FBI agent (to get security clearances for a government project), and subsequently is asked to help Sam with a "top secret" project to expand his store. The boys believe Sam is passing information to the Russians when they see him conferring with his landlord, Mr. Gronsky (Lew Palter), about the project, and lock Sam and Gronsky in the meat locker. Mike is able to free the two and everything is cleared up. Meanwhile Sam's request of Mike to draw plans for a "top secret" project lead Alice, Carol, Marcia, Jan and Cindy to assume that he is about to ask Alice to marry him, and that Mike is designing a home for them. Note: This is Allan Melvin's final appearance as Sam Franklin.
115	20	"The Snooperstar"	Bruce Bilson	Harry Winkler	February 22, 1974	113
To teach Cindy a lesson about reading her diary without permission, Marcia teases her by creating fake entries, with some help from Jan, about a Hollywood agent planning to discover Cindy and make her into the next Shirley Temple. Cindy becomes convinced that Mike's fussy client Penelope Fletcher (Natalie Schafer) is the talent scout, and Marcia can't talk Cindy out of this notion. Cindy shocks Mike with her impromptu Shirley Temple performance for Penelope, but Penelope is charmed by the act, ensuring that he will get the contract.
116	21	"The Hustler"	Michael Kane	Bill Freedman & Ben Gershman	March 1, 1974	114
The Bradys receive a pool table as a thank-you gift from Mike's boss, and Bobby quickly becomes a billiards expert. Bobby shows off his skills during Mike and Carol's cocktail party, soundly beating Mike's boss. The Bradys decide that, as nice as the gift is, they have no room for the pool table and give it to charity. Guest star: Jim Backus as Harry Matthews
117	22	"The Hair-Brained Scheme"	Jack Arnold	Charles Stewart	March 8, 1974	116
Bobby is convinced he can get rich by selling Neat & Natural Hair Tonic. He sells Greg a container, which turns Greg's hair bright orange on the eve of his high-school commencement. This necessitates a trip to the local beauty parlor, where Greg swallows his ego and re-dyes his hair just in time for graduation. Guest stars: Hope Sherwood (Sherwood Schwartz's daughter) as Gretchen, Barbara Bernstein (Florence Henderson's daughter) as Suzanne Note: Robert Reed (Mike Brady) does not appear in this episode due to a dispute over the storyline (centered on a non-FDA-approved bottle of hair tonic), which he considered an inane and antiquated cliché. After Reed wrote a lengthy memo to the staff and Paramount, Sherwood Schwartz wrote him out of the episode and later fired him from the series (which was ultimately not renewed for a sixth season).
