= Jennifer (1978 film) =

1978 film by Brice Mack

- Theatrical release poster
- Directed by: Brice Mack
- Screenplay by: Kay Cousins Johnson
- Story by: Steve Krantz
- Produced by: Steve Krantz
- Starring: Lisa Pelikan; Bert Convy; Nina Foch; John Gavin; Jeff Corey; Wesley Eure
- Cinematography: Irv Goodnoff
- Edited by: Duane Hartzel
- Music by: Porter Jordan
- Production companies: Jennifer Productions, Ltd.
- Distributed by: American International Pictures
- Release date: April 21, 1978
- Running time: 90 minutes
- Country: United States
- Language: English
- Budget: $1 million
- Box office: $1 million

Jennifer is a 1978 American supernatural horror film directed by Brice Mack and starring Lisa Pelikan, Bert Convy, Wesley Eure, Nina Foch, and John Gavin. Its plot follows a young woman from Appalachia who, ostracized by her peers at an elite Los Angeles boarding school, enacts violent revenge through her psychokinetic ability to control snakes.

Filmed in Los Angeles in the fall of 1977, Jennifer was released by American International Pictures in April 1978. The film was widely considered by critics at the time as the studio's "opportunistic cash-in" on the popularity of Brian De Palma's Carrie (1976). Some contemporary critics have assessed the film as part of a trend of ecological-themed horror films of the era, alongside Willard (1971) and Killer Bees (1974).

== Plot ==
Jennifer Baylor is a poor young woman from a Pentecostal family in Appalachia who possesses a supernatural power over snakes, including an ability to control and communicate with them. She and her father, Luke, left their home in disgrace, because when Jennifer was seven years old, some snakes she had been handling killed the town preacher's son. She refused to handle snakes ever again, though Luke now runs a pet store in suburban Los Angeles and often encourages her to use her power again. Luke is mentally disabled and obsessed with the Bible, is unable to make meals for himself without burning them, and relies on Jennifer to care for him.

Jennifer studies on a scholarship at the elite Green View School, where she is an outcast among her wealthy peers, all of whom are from prominent families, and who are largely protected by the school's headmistress, the imperious, pill-addicted Mrs. Calley. Her only real friends are the school's lunch lady, Martha, with whom Jennifer works to help supplement her tuition, and teacher Jeff Reed, the only teacher who sees the corruption in the school for what it truly is. Jennifer becomes an unwitting target for Sandra Tremayne, an entitled bully, when Jennifer exposes that Sandra stole the answers to an exam. Sandra evades legitimate consequences when her father, a U.S. senator, makes a large donation to the school, but Jennifer nevertheless becomes subject to numerous pranks and harassment from Sandra and her friends. Sandra hopes her torment will drive Jennifer to leave the school. Soon, Jane, an overweight student on the fringe of Sandra's social group, protests Sandra's excessive cruelty toward Jennifer, risking her alliance with Sandra.

One afternoon, after Jennifer finishes her job in the cafeteria, she takes a shower in the empty gymnasium locker room. Upon exiting the shower, she finds that Sandra and her friends have stolen her clothing and belongings and hung them on pipes in the pool room. When Jennifer climbs a ladder to retrieve them, Sandra's boyfriend Dayton startles her by taking photographs with a flashbulb camera, causing her to fall naked into the pool. Dayton subsequently corners Jane in an elevator, and aware of the fact that Jane is attracted to him, rapes her.

Some time later, Jennifer is horrified to find that Sandra has purchased a beloved kitten from Jennifer's father's pet store, killed it, and hung it inside Jennifer's locker. That night, Jennifer finally decides to again exercise her power over snakes, invoking them in the pet store. A notable shift in her personality follows, and she boldly confronts Jane about Sandra's murdering the kitten. Jane agrees to an alliance with Jennifer, seeking retaliation against Dayton.

As a culmination to their tormenting Jennifer, Sandra and her friends stage a kidnapping in which they abduct Jennifer from her home in the middle of the night. A reluctant Jane becomes embroiled in the plan, and watches as Dayton places Jennifer, bound and gagged, in the trunk of Sandra's car. With Dayton and her other friends following behind, Sandra drives into an empty parking garage. On the roof, they remove Jennifer from the trunk and torment her by driving their cars in circles around her. Unbeknownst to them, Jennifer invokes a multitude of snakes ranging in various sizes that descend on the scene, attacking all of her tormentors by strangling and biting them. Dayton is thrown off the parking garage to his death, and Sandra attempts to flee in her car, but Jennifer manifests a giant snake that causes her to crash the vehicle and die in a fire.

Later in her office, Mrs. Calley threatens and blames Jennifer for the mysterious event, which has left six Green View students hospitalized, but there is no evidence proving Jennifer's guilt, and the witnesses have no memory of what occurred. After dismissing Jennifer, Mrs. Calley is attacked and killed by a snake she discovers in her desk drawer. Jennifer and Jane hear her screams as they exit the school, and both respond with laughter.

== Cast ==
- Lisa Pelikan as Jennifer Baylor
  - Kimberley Eilbacher as young Jennifer
- Bert Convy as Jeff Reed
- Nina Foch as Mrs. Calley
- Amy Johnston as Sandra Tremayne
- John Gavin as Senator Tremayne
- Jeff Corey as Luke Baylor
- Louise Hoven as Jane Delano
- Ray Underwood as Dayton Powell
- Wesley Eure as Pit Lassiter
- Florida Friebus as Miss Tooker
- Georganne La Piere as Deedee Martin
- Lillian Randolph as Martha
- Domingo Ambriz as Jose
- Tony De Felicis as Bud

== Production ==
Principal photography of Jennifer began on November 28, 1977 in Los Angeles, California, on a budget of $1 million. The shoot lasted approximately four weeks.

At the time of filming, director Brice Mack had primarily worked as a background painter for Walt Disney Animation Studios. Jennifer marked Mack's second feature directorial debut, after Half a House (1976).

== Release ==
American International Pictures acquired distribution rights for Jennifer in the United States and Canada in March 1978. The film opened theatrically on April 21, 1978 in various U.S. states, including Florida, Illinois, Texas, and Wisconsin. It had its New York City premiere on May 13, 1978 and its Los Angeles premiere on September 13, 1978.

In Canada, the film opened in Calgary on May 12, 1978, followed by releases in Montreal, Ottawa, and Vancouver in the subsequent weeks.

=== Home media ===
Vestron Video released Jennifer on VHS in 1985. The film was released on DVD and Blu-ray by Kino Lorber on October 14, 2014.

== Reception ==
=== Box office ===
Jennifer grossed $1 million at the United States box office.

=== Critical response ===
Critical opinion of Jennifer at the time of its release generally focused on its similarities to Brian De Palma's Carrie (1976). Janet Maslin of The New York Times wrote that "all things considered, Jennifer could be a whole lot worse", and noted that "while Miss Pelikan is not Sissy Spacek by a long shot, she does have a suitably spooky look in her eye". Bob Keaton of the Fort Lauderdale News also noted the film's similarities to Carrie, but praised Pelikan's performance as terrific. TV Guide similarly deemed the film a "blatant Carrie rip-off".

Linda Gross of the Los Angeles Times gave the film a largely favorable assessment, describing Mack's direction as "remote and surreal with a definite drug-hazed tinge" and the film's violence as "highly stylized," deeming the picture "an atmospheric nightmare." She also noted that the film features "interesting performances," particularly from Louise Hoven, Nina Foch, and Bert Convy, though she conceded that the screenplay "is too sketchy." Joe Baltake of the Philadelphia Daily News felt that, though derivative, the film is a "good old-fashioned horror movie," praising its colorful cinematography. Ann Guarino of the New York Daily News gave the film a two and a half out of four-star rating, calling it a "repelling thriller with a good share of suspense," as well as praising Pelikan's lead performance as well as Amy Johnston's supporting role.

Robert Trussell of The Kansas City Star gave the film an unfavorable review, writing: "Other than the unintentionally amusing performances by Bert Convy as a "sexy" teacher, John Gavin as a U.S. senator, and Nina Foch as the school's head matron, this film is pretty rough going." Perry Stewart of the Fort Worth Star-Telegram conceded that while the film "is not quite the sleazy rip-off you might expect... Unless you're a certified reptilophobe, there isn't much in Jennifer to frighten you." Writing for the St. Petersburg Times, critic Bob Ross noted: "Surely producer/writer Steve Krantz and director Brice Mack are playing this Jennifer routine for laughs. But without a total commitment to horror or satire, the movie flounders meekly between the two: tame, and not too scary."

=== Modern appraisal ===
In the book Massacred By Mother Nature: Exploring the Natural Horror Film (2012), writer Lee Gambin writes favorably of Jennifer, noting that, "although it borrowed from basic narrative principles that were established in a classic like Carrie, [it] holds up on its own merits and is a slick, sophisticated and emotionally stirring ride," describing it as "a wonderfully scary Greek tragedy." He also praises the film's "glorious" visuals and the "stunning musical score" by Porter Jordan. Gambin further describes the film as part of a trend of ecological-themed horror films of the 1970s, alongside Willard (1971) and Killer Bees (1974).

== See also ==
- List of killer snake films
- Mystics in Bali
- Jaws of Satan

== Sources ==
- Craig, Rob (2019). American International Pictures: A Comprehensive Filmography. Jefferson, North Carolina: McFarland. ISBN 978-1-476-66631-0.
- Donahue, Suzanne Mary (1987). American Film Distribution: The Changing Marketplace. Ann Arbor, Michigan: UMI Research Press. ISBN 978-0-835-71776-2.
- Gambin, Lee (2012). Massacred By Mother Nature: Exploring the Natural Horror Film. Baltimore, Maryland: Midnight Marquee Press. ISBN 978-1-644-30018-3.
- Mitchell, Neil (2014). Carrie. Devils Advocates. Liverpool, England: Liverpool University Press. ISBN 978-1-800-34694-9.
- Sito, Tom (2019). Eat, Drink, Animate: An Animators Cookbook. Boca Raton, Florida: CRC Press. ISBN 978-1-351-17115-1.
