= Bridger Zadina =

American actor (born 1994)

- Born: March 23, 1994 (age 32); Poplar, Wisconsin, US
- Occupations: Actor; model
- Years active: 2006–present

Bridger Zadina (born March 23, 1994) is an American model and actor from northern Wisconsin. He is known for roles on Law & Order: Special Victims Unit, Bosch, and Better Things. He also starred in the 2014 movie Sins of Our Youth.

== Early life ==
Zadina was born on March 23, 1994, and grew up the town of Poplar, Wisconsin. His parents raised llamas. As a boy, he worked in theatre, appearing in plays at the Duluth Playhouse. His parents are Simon and Marcy Zadina and his brother is named Carson. At eleven years old, he became a national champion llama exhibitor. He also worked as a model for the department store chain Target. He attended Northwestern Middle School in Poplar until he moved to California.

== Career ==
In 2006, Zadina went to Minneapolis to audition for a talent search conducted by the ProScout talent agency. He was one of 300 children auditioning. He signed with an agent after the auditions, and moved to Los Angeles with his mother and began auditioning for shows; in his spare time he worked with an acting coach. He moved to Los Angeles in 2006 and had his first role in a nationally televised show called Stand by Me Alone.

In 2009, he guest starred as a transgender teen on Law & Order: Special Victims Unit in the episode "Transitions". When he learned that he would be playing a transgender teen he reportedly told the executive producer Neal Baer, "Wow, what am I going to tell my friends?" He was selected for the role after auditioning with almost 200 other boys. The role called for Bridger to cry and he said that he was able to cry on screen by thinking of his horse and pet llama back in Wisconsin. In 2010, he appeared in Numbers as Jim Mazzola Junior.

At 17 years old, Zadina appeared in the 2011 film Terri. In 2013, he starred alongside Lucas Till, Joel Courtney, and Ally Sheedy in the movie Sins of Our Youth. The Los Angeles Times criticized the movie, saying the plot in which teen drinking and guns lead to death was not surprising. In the movie Zadina plays one of four teen boys who drink alcohol and play with guns, killing a child.

In 2015, he was cast in the western Kill or Be Killed as an outlaw ventriloquist. In 2016, he featured in the FX show Better Things. He played the part of Harvey and had to take piano lessons for the part. In 2017, he played a drug user in the movie Ripped. The Los Angeles Times panned the film calling it an "eye roller". Also in 2017, he landed a recurring role on the television show Bosch.
