= The Private Ear =

- The Private Ear, a 1962 play by Peter Shaffer.
- "The Private Ear", an episode of The Brady Bunch
- "Private Ear", an episode of Shoestring
