= Brice Mack =

American artist (1917–2008)

- Born: Brice Harvey Mack; June 2, 1917; Manila, Philippines
- Died: January 2, 2008 (aged 90); Hollywood, California, US
- Occupation: Director
- Children: Kevin Mack

Brice Harvey Mack (June 2, 1917 – January 2, 2008) was a background painter and director, known for his extensive work at Disney in the 1940s and 1950s as a background painter. He was hired for story writing at Disney in the 1950s, and worked on illustrating children's books based on the studio's films.

His first credited appearance was as the background artist for the Rite of Spring sequence in Fantasia. He worked on Song of the South, Alice in Wonderland, Peter Pan, and Lady and the Tramp. He also worked on Walt Disney's anthology television series as a background painter and writer in the late 1950s. In the 1950s he became the president of ERA Productions, a small studio which was staffed with animators who had mostly come from Disney after leaving during the strike of 1941, producing and directing animated and live action commercials for the Peterson Company, as well as work for Disney. He later went on to form Unicorn Productions, with which he continued to work on commercials, films, and theme park rides, continuing to consult for Disney into the early 1990s, when he retired. Mack had a wife, Ginni, with whom he had three sons, including Kevin Mack, an Academy Award–winning visual effects supervisor.

His feature work includes directing the 1978 live-action horror film Jennifer, written by Steve Krantz. Other director credits include Rooster: Spurs of Death (1983), Swap Meet (1979), and Half a House (1979). He was the executive in charge of production for Ruby and the producer of Mara of the Wilderness.

== Awards ==
Brice Mack was awarded the Golden Motion Picture Cartoonist award in 1987.

== Filmography ==
Film	Year	Notes
Fantasia	1940	backgrounds for Rite of Spring sequence
Song of the South	1946	backgrounds for cartoon sequences
Fun and Fancy Free	1947	backgrounds
Melody Time	1948	backgrounds for Johnny Appleseed, Little Toot and Pecos Bill
Pluto's Fledgling	1948	short
So Dear to My Heart	1948	backgrounds for cartoon sequences
The Adventures of Ichabod and Mr. Toad	1949	backgrounds for both segments
Pluto's Surprise Package	1949	short
Pluto's Sweater	1949	short
Bubble Bee	1949	short
Sheep Dog	1949	short
Cinderella	1950	b Backgrounds
Wonder Dog	1950	short
Alice in Wonderland	1951	backgrounds
Two-Gun Goofy	1952	short
Teachers Are People	1952	short
How to Be a Detective	1952	short
Peter Pan	1953	backgrounds
Father's Day Off	1953	short
For Whom the Bulls Toil	1953	short
Father's Weekend	1953	short
Donald's Diary	1954	short
Casey Bats Again	1954	short
Lady and the Tramp	1955	backgrounds
Beezy Bear	1955	short

Film (after years at Disney)	Year	Notes
Mara of the Wilderness	1965	produced with company Unicorn Films. Starred Adam West
Half a House	1975	directed; received an Academy Award nomination for best song
Jennifer	1978	directed
Swap Meet	1979	directed
Rooster: Spurs of Death	1983	directed
