= Wesley Eure =

American actor, singer, author, producer, director (born 1951)

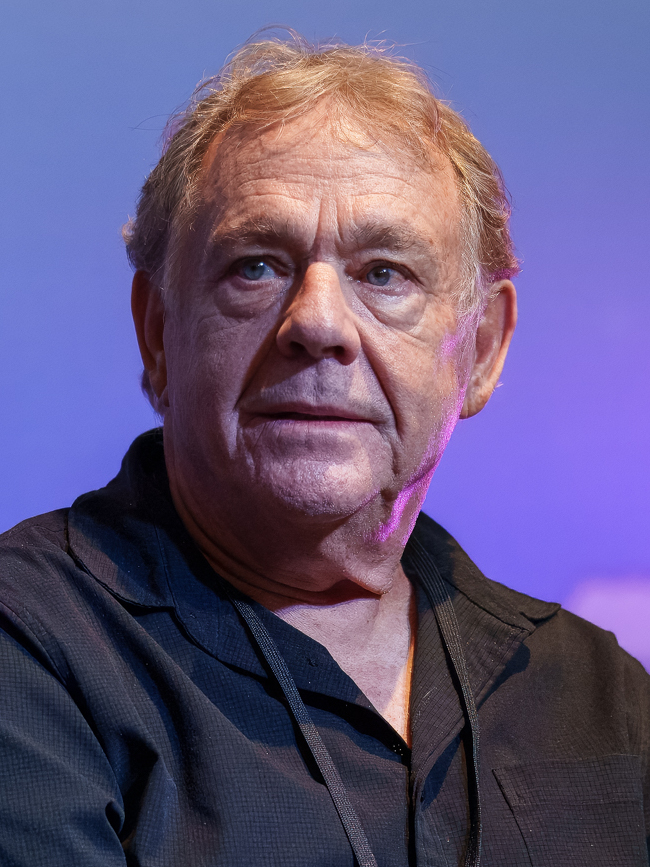
- Eure in 2026
- Born: Wesley Eure Loper; August 17, 1951 (age 75); Baton Rouge, Louisiana, U.S.
- Occupations: Actor; director; producer; author
- Years active: 1968–present
- Partner: Richard Chamberlain (1975–1976)
- Website: www.wesleyeure.com

Wesley Eure (born Wesley Eure Loper; August 17, 1951) is an American actor, singer, author, producer, director, and educator widely known for his role as Michael Horton on the American soap opera Days of Our Lives from 1974 to 1981. During the period 1974 to 1976 he also starred on the popular children's television series Land of the Lost as Will Marshall. He later hosted the popular children's game show Finders Keepers in 1987 and 1988, and co-created the children's educational television show Dragon Tales in 1999. He has also published several books, produced plays and been an organizer and fundraiser for several charities.

== Early life and education ==
Eure was born Wesley Eure Loper in Baton Rouge, Louisiana, on August 17, 1951. His father left the family when he was two years old, so his mother, Mary Jane Loper (February 6, 1927 – January 25, 2011), moved him and his elder sister, Gai (born September 10, 1950), to Hattiesburg, Mississippi, where Eure's grandmother lived. While Eure grew up in Mississippi, his mother obtained a bachelor's degree in psychology and began teaching. She subsequently took positions in Texas and Illinois, and became a drug abuse counselor with the state of Nevada. The Lopers moved to Las Vegas, where his mother ran a methadone clinic and hosted a radio talk show about drug abuse. He spent his senior year of high school in Las Vegas.

== Career ==
Eure wanted to be an actor from the age of five, his love of performing stemming from a need for attention. While the family lived in Illinois, he enrolled in a summer program at Northwestern University, where he took acting lessons and won an award. His first break came when he was 17 years old and working part-time at the New Frontier Hotel and Casino in Las Vegas selling artwork. He was hired as a driver for Robert Goulet and Carol Lawrence during their summer tour. He spent most of 1968 and 1969 as their driver.

After the Goulet-Lawrence tour ended in New York City, Eure decided he would not return to high school and stayed in New York. After a few short months of auditions and odd jobs, in 1970 Eure became a cast member at the American Shakespeare Festival in Stratford, Connecticut. Hired more for his ability to make the cast and crew laugh than his acting skill, Eure worked with a dialect coach to get rid of his deep Southern accent. During his time in Stratford, he worked with Jane Alexander in The Tempest, and appeared in Mourning Becomes Electra, Merry Wives of Windsor, Twelfth Night, and many original works produced by the company. At the Bucks County Playhouse in Pennsylvania, he performed in West Side Story (portraying "Action" of the Jets) and then joined a musical comedy revue and traveled throughout the East Coast resort areas.

=== Television ===
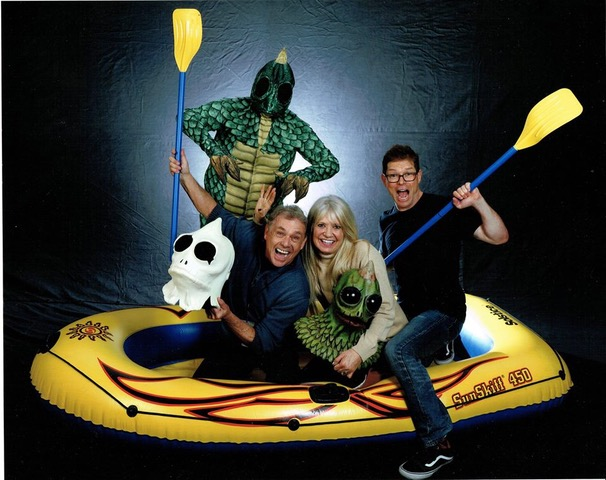
Land of the Lost cast photo with a Sleestak (Richard Brown), Eure, Kathy Coleman (Holly) & Phil Paley (Cha-ka) in 2016.

Eure moved to Los Angeles in 1973 after discovering it was cheaper to live there, but offered just as much opportunity to become an actor. He was hired to star in a pilot for a Kaye Ballard TV series, The Organic Vegetables, created and produced by the team behind The Monkees.

When that series was not picked up due to the 1973 writers' strike, Eure answered an ad in an industry trade publication to audition for a television show. He learned that David Cassidy was threatening to leave The Partridge Family, and that the audition was for a role as a "neighbor boy" who would take over the lead in the family band from Cassidy. Eure won the audition, but never joined The Partridge Family after Cassidy agreed to stay on. The show was canceled before the next season started.

In 1974, Eure auditioned for and won a role on NBC's Days of Our Lives. Eure had previously met producer Sid Krofft and was committed to do an audition for a new children's show he was working on. When Eure flew to New York City at the request of Broadway producer David Merrick to try out for a role in a theatrical production of Candide, he didn't want to audition for Krofft due to his commitment to Days (and because he'd be playing a 16-year-old boy). But Eure auditioned and won the role of Will Marshall on Land of the Lost. He kept his commitment to both shows after the Kroffts repeatedly asked him to star on Land of the Lost.

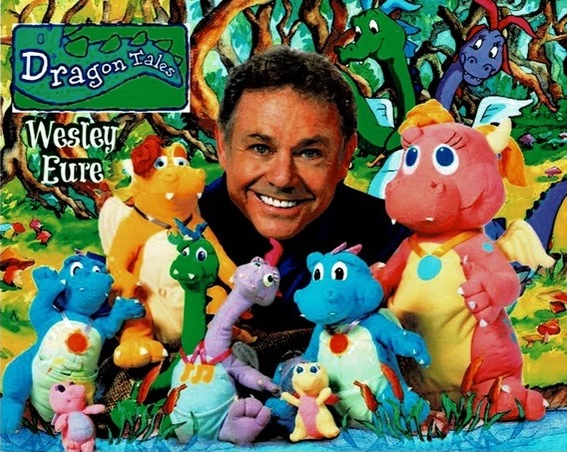
Eure in 2015 with stuffed animals from the show Dragon Tales on PBS that he developed and co-created.

From 1974 to 1981, Eure starred on NBC's Days of Our Lives, playing the role of Mike Horton. He also starred as Will Marshall in Sid and Marty Krofft's children's adventure series, Land of the Lost from 1974 to 1976, filming this show and Days of Our Lives simultaneously. (The gold chain he wore on the show was a gift from his then-lover.) As a publicity stunt, Eure agreed to be billed simply as "Wesley" on Land of the Lost, although he later regretted the decision. Eure's stardom in the 1970s led to a number of appearances on game shows. He was repeatedly asked to appear on both Password Plus and Match Game. He appeared on Password so often that he became a semi-regular on the show. He earned $2,000 to do a week's worth of shows (five shows), which took a single day to shoot.

In 1987, Eure became host of the Nickelodeon children's game show Finders Keepers, and continued in this role through 1988. When the show was sold to Fox for its 1989 (and final) season, Fox declined to hire Eure as host and replaced him with Larry Toffler.

Eure co-produced, wrote and acted in Fox Television's hidden-camera show Totally Hidden Video (which aired from 1989 to 1992). He also co-created Dragon Tales, PBS Kids's Emmy-nominated animated series for preschoolers which began airing in 1999, and directed Spy TV for NBC in 2001.

Eure also hosted an educational DVD called Power Over Poison to teach kids how to avoid poisons, produced by WQED, the PBS station in Pittsburgh. Channel 9 TV in Australia hired Eure to be the permanent host of their Tonight Show, but lost a ten-month immigration battle with Actor's Equity in Australia.

=== Film ===
Eure appeared in 1978 as a murderer in The Toolbox Murders and as an evil man who is eaten by snakes in Jennifer. While filming Jennifer, Eure claims he had a difficult time working with the various snakes on the set, including the large boa constrictor that features in the climax. He later appeared in Hanna-Barbera's 1979 comedy C.H.O.M.P.S., which also starred Valerie Bertinelli, Red Buttons, Jim Backus, Hermione Baddeley, and Conrad Bain.

Eure and Land of the Lost co-star Kathy Coleman filmed cameo appearances for the 2009 film Land of the Lost starring Will Ferrell, but were edited out of the final cut.

He appeared in the 2014 independent thriller film, Sins of Our Youth as Police Chief Kaplan.

=== Music ===
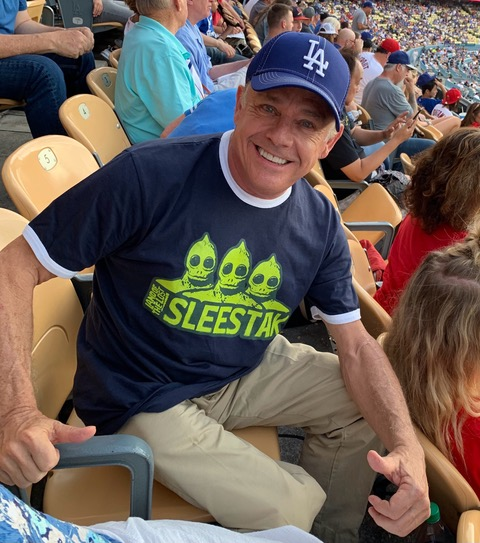
Eure at Dodger Stadium in 2019

Whenever his acting career seemed stalled, Eure continued to sing. He became friends with Shaun Cassidy and Leif Garrett, and some of his music was produced by Bobby Sherman, though a full album was never completed. Motown Records placed him under contract, and he was in a boy band whose music was produced by Mike Curb. He also sang a few times with the Jackson Five. He had a Las Vegas act at Harrah's casino.

=== Books ===
Eure lived briefly in Bali after leaving Totally Hidden Video. In 1992, Eure published his first children's novel The Red Wings of Christmas. It has been called "the new American classic" by CNN, and was optioned by Disney for a full-length animated feature. The book was illustrated by Ron Palillo who played Arnold Horshack on the 1970s TV series Welcome Back, Kotter.

Eure's fifth book, A Fish Out of Water, is his first pre-schooler book. The story of a bird and a fish that fall in love and make it work, it is used by schools to teach racial tolerance. The graduate art students at Meredith College in Raleigh, North Carolina illustrated it. He also wrote The Whale That Ate the Storm.

Knightsbridge Publishing released two of his humor books, Fun with Fax and On-the-Wall Off-the-Wall Office Humor.

=== Teaching ===
For many years, Eure has given interactive lectures in elementary and secondary schools about reading and writing.

=== Theatre ===
Eure has starred on the stage in shows such as Bus Stop, Butterflies Are Free, Love Sex and the IRS, as well as the musicals I Love My Wife and Joseph and the Amazing Technicolor Dreamcoat. His company Games at Sea created, produced and directed on-board entertainment for cruise ships such as Crystal Cruises and Celebrity Cruise Line. For several years, Eure's Blues Brothers 2000 live stage show appeared at Universal Studios Hollywood. He co-produced a Stephen Schwartz musical titled Snapshots.

== Philanthropy ==
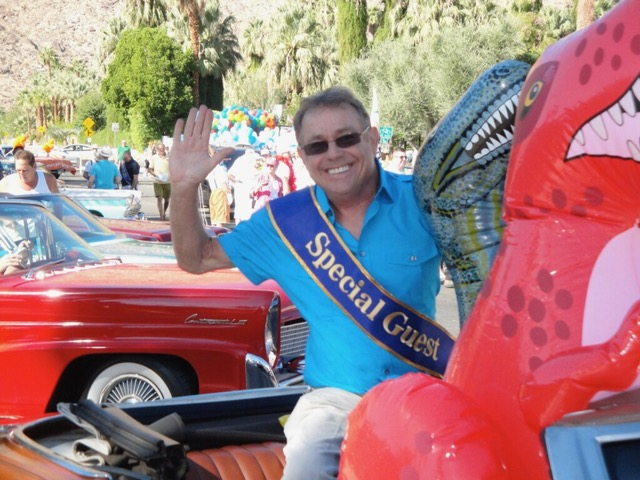
Eure honored as Special Guest for the Pride Parade Palm Springs 2016

For many years, he was a fundraiser for the March of Dimes, and has also raised money through telethons and fund-raising campaigns for groups like the Variety Club and the Special Olympics. Eure has been a fundraiser for a number of HIV/AIDS causes, including hosting the LalaPOOLooza HIV/AIDS fundraiser in Palm Springs, California, for many years, the Desert AIDS Project benefit and raising funds and assisting with Project Angel Food, which feeds homebound AIDS patients.

== Honors ==
In 2007, a Golden Palm Star on the Palm Springs, California, Walk of Stars was dedicated to him.

== Personal life ==
While working on Days of our Lives, Eure supported his mother as she attended law school in her 50s. After graduating at the top of her class, she became his personal manager and attorney.

Eure was the travel editor for Palm Springs Life magazine, writing a bi-monthly travel column.

In the 1970s, Eure met and had a relationship with actor Richard Chamberlain.

== Filmography ==
Year	Title	Role	Notes
1974–1976	Land of the Lost	Will Marshall	43 episodes
1974–1981	Days of Our Lives	Mike Horton	Unknown episodes
1978	The Toolbox Murders	Kent Kingsley	
1978	Insight	Steve	Episode - "Second Chorus"
1978	Jennifer	Pit Lassiter	
1979	CHiPs	Himself	Episode - "Roller Disco: Part 2"
1979	C.H.O.M.P.S.	Brian Foster	
1979–1981	Password Plus	Himself - Contestant	21 episodes
1980	Match Game	Himself - Panelist	5 episodes
1980	CHiPs	Himself - Uncredited	Episode - "The Great 5K Star Race and Boulder Wrap Party: Part 2"
1987–1988	Finders Keepers	Himself - Host	130 episodes
1989	Spy TV		
1989–1992	Totally Hidden Video	Writer, Various Characters	14 episodes
1992	Payback	Co-producer	
1999–2005	Dragon Tales	Writer, Developer & Creative producer (94 episodes)	
2001	Totally Hidden Video	Co-producer	
2001	Spy TV	Head writer	
2013	Geography Club	Mr. Kaplan	
2015	Sidewalks Entertainment	Himself - Guest	Episode - "Wesley Eure"
2016	Sins of Our Youth	Chief Kaplan	
