= Theo Marcuse =

American actor (1920–1967)

Theodore Marcuse
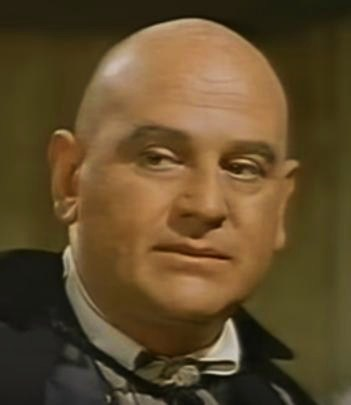
- Theodore Marcuse in the TV-series Bonanza, episode The Abduction, 1960
- Born: Theodore Carroll Marcuse; August 2, 1920; Seattle, Washington, U.S.
- Died: November 29, 1967 (aged 47); Hollywood, California, U.S.
- Resting place: Golden Gate National Cemetery
- Other name: Theo Marcuse
- Occupation: Actor
- Years active: 1950–1967

Theodore Carroll Marcuse (August 2, 1920 – November 29, 1967) was an American character actor who appeared frequently on television in the 1950s and 1960s, often portraying villains.

== Early years ==
Marcuse was born in Seattle, Washington to Margaret and Theodore M. Marcuse, a World War I veteran and co-owner of Klementis-Marcuse, Co., fur retailer.

After growing up in San Francisco, he studied dramatic arts at Stanford University and was active in theatrical productions there. Later he received a master's degree in classical literature from Stanford.

== Military service ==
Marcuse served with the Navy during World War II and was awarded a Silver Star, Bronze Star Medal, and a Presidential Unit Citation for his heroism while serving as a lieutenant on the famed submarine USS Tirante. Other officers on board included future Massachusetts governor Endicott Peabody and author Edward L. Beach, Jr., who wrote the submarine classic Run Silent, Run Deep.

== Career ==
Marcuse trained under Guthrie McClintic in his theatre company, along with Charlton Heston, and appeared on Broadway with Katharine Cornell, Maurice Evans and others. In 1948 and 1949, he toured nationally for nine months in a production of Medea.

On television he appeared on many series, including The Beverly Hillbillies, Voyage to the Bottom of the Sea, The Wild Wild West, Have Gun – Will Travel, Bonanza, Hogan's Heroes (the 1967 episode "The Hostage", as General von Heiner), Batman, Star Trek (episode "Catspaw"), The Time Tunnel, I Spy, The Monkees, Perry Mason, Peter Gunn, The Untouchables, The Twilight Zone episodes "The Trade-Ins" and "To Serve Man", and The Man from U.N.C.L.E. episodes "The Re-collectors Affair," "The Minus-X Affair," and "The Pieces of Fate Affair". His film career included roles in The Two Little Bears (1961), Hitler (1962, as Julius Streicher), A Tiger Walks (1964), The Cincinnati Kid (1965), Mara of the Wilderness (1965), Harum Scarum (1965), The Last of the Secret Agents? (1966), The Wicked Dreams of Paula Schultz (1968) and The Picasso Summer (1969).

== Death ==
Marcuse died in a traffic accident in Hollywood, Los Angeles, California, at the age of 47. He was buried in Golden Gate National Cemetery in San Bruno, California.

== Partial filmography ==
- The Desperate Women (1954) - Arzt
- The 27th Day (1957) - Col. Gregor (uncredited)
- Jeanne Eagels (1957) - Dr. Richards (uncredited)
- Have Gun - Will Travel (1957–1959) - General Beauregard Grock / Wally / Folger /Bartender
- Operation Eichmann (1961) - Captain Felsner
- The Two Little Bears (1961) - Janos
- Hitler (1962) - Julius Streicher
- For Love or Money (1963) - Artist
- Sands of Beersheba (1964) - Nuri
- A Tiger Walks (1964) - Josef Pietz
- Mara of the Wilderness (1965) - Felix
- Harum Scarum (1965) - Sinan
- The Wild Wild West (1966) - Dr. Vincent Kirby
- The Last of the Secret Agents? (1966) - Zoltan Schubach
- The Glass Bottom Boat (1966) - Gregor - Spy with Cigar (uncredited)
- The Monkees (1966, TV Series) - episode "Royal Flush" - Archduke Otto
- Hogan's Heroes (1967, TV Series) - The Hostage
- The Wild Wild West (1967) - Abdul Hassan in S3 E17 "The Night of the Headless Woman"
- Star Trek (1967) - episode "Catspaw" - Korob
- The Wicked Dreams of Paula Schultz (1968) - Owl (released posthumously)
- The Picasso Summer (1969) - The Host (final film role; released posthumously)
