= The Toolbox Murders =

1978 American slasher film by Dennis Donnelly

- Theatrical release poster
- Directed by: Dennis Donnelly
- Screenplay by: Neva Friedenn; Robert Easter; Ann Kindberg
- Produced by: Tony DiDio
- Starring: Cameron Mitchell; Pamelyn Ferdin; Wesley Eure
- Cinematography: Gary Graver
- Edited by: Nunzio Darpino
- Music by: George Deaton
- Production companies: Cal-Am Productions; Tony DiDio Productions
- Distributed by: Cal-Am Artists
- Release dates: February 17, 1978 (El Paso, Texas); November 1, 1978 (Los Angeles, California)
- Running time: 93 minutes
- Country: United States
- Language: English
- Budget: $165,000
- Box office: >$512,000

The Toolbox Murders is a 1978 American slasher film directed by Dennis Donnelly and written by Neva Friedenn, Robert Easter, and Anne Kindberg. (Note: The Writers Guild of America gave "story by" and "screenplay by" credit to Robert Easter and Ann N. Kindberg and the credits appear as such in the billing block on merchandise and material. However, the film's opening credits feature only the "screenplay by" credit with Neva Friedenn added in.) Starring Cameron Mitchell, Pamelyn Ferdin, and Wesley Eure, it follows a series of violent murders taking place in a Los Angeles apartment complex, followed by the kidnapping and disappearance of a teenage girl who resides there. The film was marketed as being a dramatization of true events, though no source can confirm this. It was briefly banned in the early 1980s in the United Kingdom during the "video nasty" panic.

== Plot ==
A man dressed in black drives through Los Angeles, listening to the exhortations of a radio preacher. Near a car dealership, the man has a flashback of a car accident that occurred at the site, which killed a young woman. The man arrives at an apartment complex and kills Mrs. Andrews, a female tenant (who recognizes him), with an electric drill. Afterward, the man dons a ski mask and murders two other women, the first with a hammer and the second with a screwdriver. The police are called, and they interview the people who found the bodies, as well as Vance Kingsley, the owner of the building. The next night, the killer strikes again, breaking into the apartment of a woman who is masturbating in her bathtub and shooting her in the stomach and head with a nail gun. The murderer then abducts Laurie Ballard, a 15-year-old who lives in the above apartment with her family.

Laurie's brother, Joey, is questioned by Detective Jamison and, frustrated by the detective's seemingly lax attitude towards Laurie's disappearance, decides to search for his sister on his own. While looking through the homes of the murdered women, Joey meets up with Kent, Vance's nephew, who has been hired to clean up the apartments of the dead tenants. While Joey is helping Kent, Kent mentions that Vance has not been the same since Kathy, (his cousin and Vance's daughter), was killed in a car accident.

It is revealed that Vance is the serial killer, having been driven insane and to religious mania by the death of his daughter. He is killing sinners and has kidnapped Laurie (who is kept tied up and gagged in Kathy's bedroom) to replace Kathy. During a discussion with Detective Jamison, Joey realizes that all the clues point to Vance being the killer, so he goes to the Kingsley house and is followed there by Kent (who had earlier seen the bound and gagged Laurie in his uncle's home). Joey finds bloody tools in Vance's garage, and is confronted by Kent, who sets Joey on fire—burning him to death—to protect his family.

Kent walks in on Vance talking to Laurie, and enrages his uncle by telling him that he and Kathy had an incestuous relationship. Vance and Kent fight, and Kent ends up fatally stabbing Vance with a kitchen knife. Kent goes to Laurie and cuts her bonds with a pair of scissors; Laurie, crying, is elated to be free, and Kent appears to comfort her, but he begins kissing Laurie and then rapes her. Afterward, Kent relaxes on the bed and behaves as if he and Laurie are married, and implies that he killed Joey and Vance. Laurie sees the scissors Kent used to cut her free on the bedside table. In the final scene, Laurie, dazed and bloodied, is seen slowly walking through an empty parking lot in the twilight, as an intertitle states that the film was a dramatization of events that occurred in 1967 and that Laurie, after having been institutionalized for three years, now resides in the San Fernando Valley with her husband and their child.

== Cast ==
- Cameron Mitchell as Vance Kingsley
- Pamelyn Ferdin as Laurie Ballard
- Wesley Eure as Kent Kingsley
- Nicholas Beauvy as Joey Ballard
- Tim Donnelly as Lieutenant Mark Jamison
- Aneta Corsaut as Joanne Ballard
- Faith McSwain as Mrs. Andrews
- Marciee Drake as Deborah
- Evelyn Guerrero as Maria
- Victoria Perry as Woman In Apartment
- Robert Bartlett as Man In Apartment
- Betty Cole as John's Wife
- John Hawker as John
- Don Diamond as Sergeant Cameron
- Alisa Powell as Girlfriend
- Kelly Nichols as Dee Ann DeVore
- Robert Forward as Screamer Man
- Kathleen O'Malley as Screamer Woman
- Gil Galvano as The Man
- James Nolan as Al
- George Deaton as Preacher

== Production ==
=== Development ===
Development for The Toolbox Murders began in 1977 when L.A. producer Tony Didio wanted to make a low-budget horror film after noticing a successful re-release of Tobe Hooper's landmark horror film The Texas Chain Saw Massacre. Didio had been intrigued by the film's financial success and, knowing the film's distributors, contacted them inquiring why the film was being re-released so soon. After a conversation with the film's distributors, Didio decided to release his own low-budget horror film. Didio screened the film with writers Ann Kindberg, Robert Easter, and Neva Friedenn, giving them the mandate to create a variation of Hooper's landmark film. According to journalist Linda Gross, the screenplay was loosely based on a string of serial killings in Minnesota committed by a man who attacked women using various tools.

=== Casting ===
Wesley Eure was cast in the role of Vance's nephew, Kent, who helps clean the apartment, and who, in fact, turns out to be an accomplice to his uncle's killings. Eure, who had previously appeared on the series Land of the Lost—which had recently been canceled at that time—agreed to take the role as he had been tired of taking "goody-goody roles. I'd been running from dinosaurs and being the perfect son for years, and now I got to be the killer!"

=== Filming ===
Principal photography of The Toolbox Murders began in the summer of 1977 in Canoga Park, Los Angeles at locations on Sherman Way and Vanowen Streets. The film was shot over 18 days on a budget of approximately $165,000.

== Release ==
=== Box office ===
The Toolbox Murders was released theatrically in the USA by Cal-Am Artists, opening regionally in El Paso, Texas on February 17, 1978. By mid-1978, the film had grossed $512,000 at 90 theaters in the USA. It had its Los Angeles premiere on November 1, 1978.

In 1979, it was selected for screening at the 12th International Festival de Cine Fantástico y de Terror in Sitges, Spain.

The film was put out on VHS by VCI Entertainment.

=== Censorship ===
The film was briefly on the list of the video nasties and was initially banned in the UK before being subsequently acquitted in court and removed from the Director of Public Prosecutions's list. The film was also banned in 1978 by the apartheid Publications Control Board.

=== Critical reception ===
Upon its release, critics complained about the film's misogynistic views towards victimization, and exploitation of women along with its graphic violence and nudity. Linda Gross of the Los Angeles Times lambasted the film as "degenerate, unmotivated, and pornographic trash," summarizing Donnelly's direction as "flaccid and voyeuristic." Fred Beldin from The New York Times criticized the film's characters and villains as "clumsily expressed" and called the films conclusion "incredibly silly" concluding, "as a result, the only enjoyment that can be obtained from the film is ultimately derisive".

Robert Firsching from Allmovie called it "misogynistic" and "nasty", stating of the film's murder scenes, "None of these things would be quite as shocking if not for the cast, most of whom (save for Cameron Mitchell and Nichols) might have wondered what they were doing in junk like this".

Bill Gibron, writing for DVD Verdict, said the film was "a cut above (no pun intended) your average exploitation horror film" though went on to say "if The Toolbox Murders has one major flaw, it is in the division between the gory slasher and neurotic thriller film" and "The first half is gruesome. The last half is unsettling. But they really are almost two different movies". Another review by the same website was also predominantly positive, stating "Sure it's got gore and nudity galore, but I think it's survived as long as it has because it completely upsets viewer expectations in its second half. By starting out as a typical slasher and ending as a psychological thriller, Toolbox gets under the skin in a way that sticking with one genre or another would not have". The review concluded by saying "it's gory side is gory enough and its creepy side creepy enough to make it worth a watch for those interested in exploitation fare" despite the flat middle half and unrealistic, twist-filled ending.

Jacob Knight of Birth.Movies.Death. praised the film as a "blitzkrieg of brutal, Biblical violence," adding: "Truth be told, The Toolbox Murders is a really nasty affair—utterly unpleasant up until its final moments. But Dennis Donnelly has crafted a San Fernando Valley slice of gnarly exploitation that's sure to please even the most hardcore horror hounds. While the mutilations come fast and furious, there's not a whole lot of gore to speak of. Instead, there's a fatalistic tone that permeates every frame, reinforced by George Deaton's preposterously portentous score."

On the review aggregator website Rotten Tomatoes, 13% of 8 critics' reviews are positive, with an average rating of 3/10. Metacritic, which uses a weighted average, assigned the film a score of 35 out of 100, based on 4 critics, indicating "generally unfavorable" reviews.

=== Home media ===
The film was released on VHS by VCI/Anchor Bay on September 15, 1989. An edited DVD was released in the UK in 2000 by VIPCO, in 2017 an uncut version was released in the UK by 88 Films. The film was also released as a Special Edition DVD by Blue Underground in 2003, and was re-released on Blu-ray in 2010.

== Legacy ==
The film has gained a cult following in the decades since its release, and has been cited by author Stephen King as one of his favorite horror films.

Scott Glosserman claimed to have put an easter egg in his film Behind the Mask: The Rise of Leslie Vernon with the character of Eugene being responsible for the toolbox murders.

In 2004, Tobe Hooper directed a remake, titled Toolbox Murders. It departed considerably from the original plotline, and ultimately was better received than the original.

== Sources ==
- Abley, Sean (2013). Out in the Dark: Interviews with Gay Horror Filmmakers, Actors, and Authors. Maple Shade, New Jersey: Lethe Press. ISBN 978-1-590-21272-1.
- Everman, Welch D. (1993). Cult Horror Films: From Attack of the 50 Foot Woman to Zombies of Mora Tau. New York City, New York: Carol Publishing Group. ISBN 978-0-8065-1425-3.
- Kerekes, David; Slater, David (2000). See No Evil: Banned Films and Video Controversy. London, England: Headpress. ISBN 978-1-900-48610-1.
- Thrower, Stephen (2007). Nightmare USA: The Untold Story of the Exploitation Independents. Godalming, England: FAB Press. ISBN 978-1-903-25446-2.
