= C.H.O.M.P.S. =

1979 film by Don Chaffey

- Theatrical release poster
- Directed by: Don Chaffey
- Screenplay by: Joseph Barbera; Duane Poole; Dick Robbins
- Story by: Joseph Barbera
- Produced by: Burt Topper; Joseph Barbera
- Starring: Wesley Eure; Valerie Bertinelli; Conrad Bain
- Cinematography: Charles F. Wheeler
- Edited by: Dick Darling; Warner E. Leighton
- Music by: Hoyt Curtin
- Production company: Hanna-Barbera Productions
- Distributed by: American International Pictures
- Release date: August 31, 1979
- Running time: 89 minutes
- Country: United States
- Language: English
- Budget: $3.5 million
- Box office: $1.8 million

C.H.O.M.P.S. is a 1979 American comic science fiction film produced by Hanna-Barbera Productions and directed by Don Chaffey. It is one of Hanna-Barbera’s live-action productions, despite their being primarily known as an animation studio.

== Plot ==
Brian Foster (Wesley Eure), a young inventor, creates a robotic dog for use as part of a home protection system. C.H.O.M.P.S. is an acronym for "Canine HOMe Protection System". Ralph Norton (Conrad Bain) is his boss, with whom he constantly argues. Foster develops a relationship with Norton's daughter, Casey (Valerie Bertinelli). A rival company wants the dog and sends a few petty criminals to kidnap "C.H.O.M.P.S."

== Cast ==
- Wesley Eure as Brian Foster
- Valerie Bertinelli as Casey Norton
- Conrad Bain as Ralph Norton
- Chuck McCann as Brooks
- Red Buttons as Bracken
- Hermione Baddeley as Mrs. Flower
- Jim Backus as Mr. Gibbs
- James Reynolds as Reporter

== Production ==
Joseph Barbera approached his friend Samuel Z. Arkoff of American International Pictures about his company collaborating with Hanna-Barbera on live-action films. Though William Hanna and other members of Hanna-Barbera were not eager to venture beyond the animation field, according to Barbera, Arkoff was enthusiastic about the ideas that Barbera presented, and agreed in November 1975 to make four films together. Barbera's first idea was for a film about a super-canine, robotic Doberman pinscher guard dog which would capitalize on several ideas popular at the time. Filming started in and around Los Angeles in May 1978, 2½ years after the collaboration was announced and was Hanna-Barbera's first live-action feature film.

Barbera recalled that Arkoff's son Louis suggested that rather than a Doberman, the dog should be a non-threatening dog in the Benji mold. Barbera attributes this change in focus in the story to the film's lackluster performance at the box office. In his autobiography, Barbera wrote that the film "did okay... but it never made the splash it should have." Because of this, the future film deals between Hanna-Barbera and AIP were canceled.

Burt Topper worked on the movie as producer with Barbera, with Arkoff as executive producer.

== Release ==
A PG-rated version of C.H.O.M.P.S. was shown for a short time during the summer of 1979. The stricter rating was due to some language employed by a dog—not the title character. It was edited, with the canine profanity overdubbed, in order to receive a G rating and released during the Christmas season. This version was released in Los Angeles on December 21, 1979.

== Critical reception ==
On the film's release, Variety wrote, "although it features a cute canine hero, a pair of do-gooding young people and a bevy of silly-minded adults, pic has little of the action or charm that lure audiences". The review noted that director Don Chaffey "has done what he can to keep the pic moving given what he has to work with". Of the performers, Variety judged, "Actors are uniformly okay but there's really only one star in this picture, 'Chomps.' Benji he's not."

Judging the film to be "unpretentious but slightly dismal in its execution", the Los Angeles Times wrote, "The premise is engaging enough to entertain dog lovers and kids for awhile, but the screenplay... is mediocre television sitcom fare and too thin to sustain an entire movie."

== Merchandising ==
Scholastic Corporation released a 121-page book version of the film's story at the time of the film's first release.

== Home media ==
MGM Home Entertainment (part of Metro-Goldwyn-Mayer, the successor-in-interest to AIP) released C.H.O.M.P.S. in DVD format on April 12, 2005.

== Bibliography ==
- Crume, Vic (1979). C.H.O.M.P.S.: From the Hanna-Barbera/American International Productions' film. Scholastic Book Services. ISBN 0-590-30528-X.
- The Hollywood Reporter, vol. 251 no. 34, May 19, 1978, p. 19.
- The Hollywood Reporter, vol. 259 no. 37, December 20, 1979, p. 3.
