= Kelly Nichols =

American pornographic actress (born 1956)

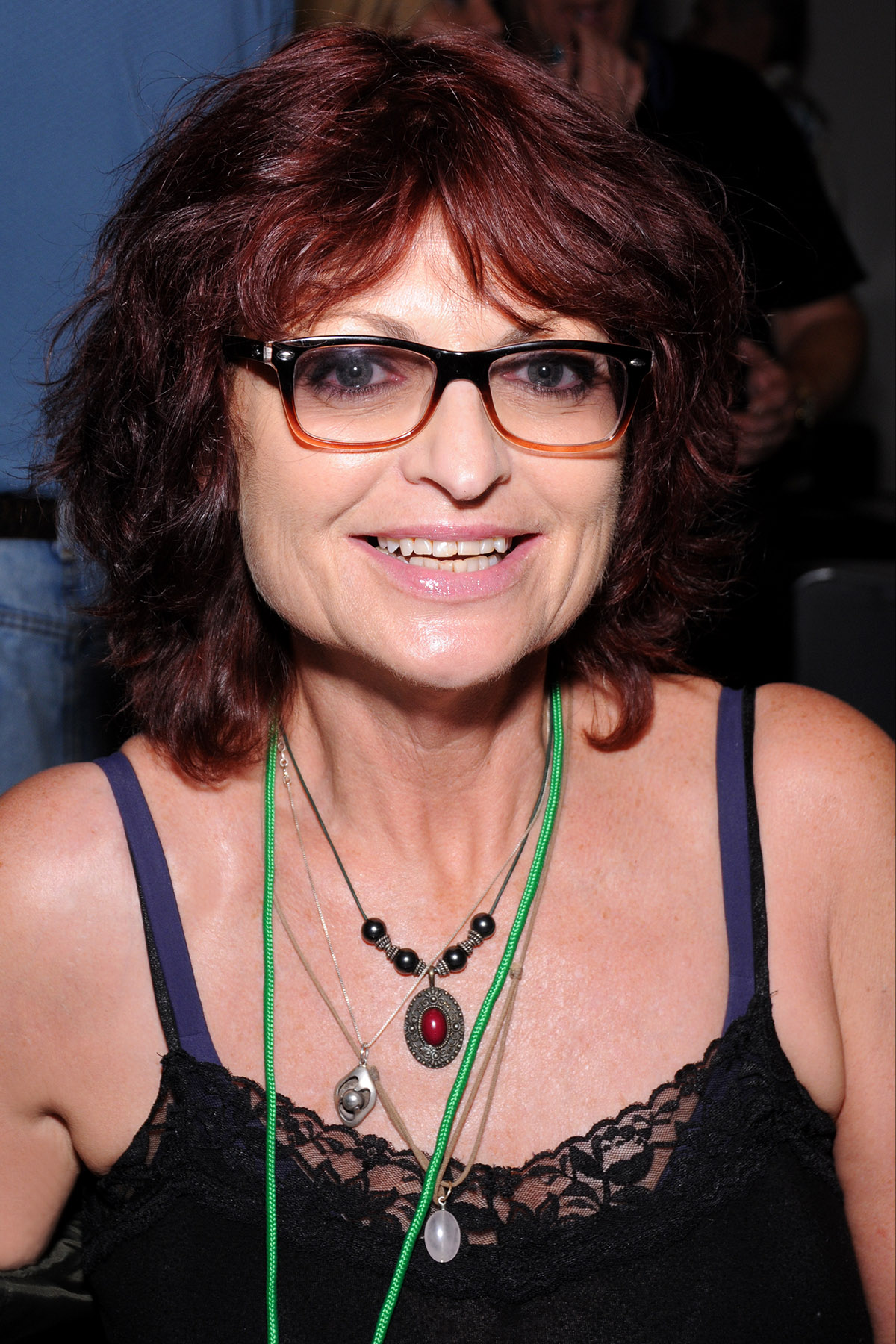
- Nichols in 2014
- Born: Mary Anne Walters; June 8, 1956 (age 70); Covina, California, U.S.
- Other names: Maryanne; Marianne
- Occupation: Pornographic actress
- Height: 5 ft 5.5 in (1.66 m)

Kelly Nichols (born June 8, 1956) is a former pornographic actress.

== Early life ==
Nichols was born in Covina, California and grew up in a Catholic household, the only female out of six children.

== Career ==
Nichols began her career posing for adult magazines such as Oui, Hustler, and Penthouse. She made her first adult film Bon Appetit for Chuck Vincent, who was impressed by her Penthouse layout. She would also make two of her most notable films for Vincent, Roommates and In Love.

She appeared in the mainstream horror films The Toolbox Murders and Death Mask. She also was a stand-in for Jessica Lange in the film King Kong.

She starred in over 50 adult features, and has been presented with several industry awards of merit: the Adult Film Association of America Best Actress Award for her work in the film In Love (1983); in 1993, she was presented by the Free Speech Coalition the Life Time Achievement Award; and she was inducted into the Erotic Legends Hall of Fame in 1996; inducting into the AVN Hall of Fame in 1994 and into the XRCO Hall of Fame in 1998. Nichols worked as a make-up artist on adult films during the 1990s and 2000s.
