= Sins of Our Youth =

2014 American teen film

- Directed by: Gary Entin
- Written by: Edmund Entin
- Produced by: Michael Huffington; Frederick Levy; Anthony Bretti
- Starring: Mitchel Musso; Lucas Till; Joel Courtney; Bridger Zadina; Ally Sheedy; Wesley Eure
- Cinematography: Matthew Irving
- Edited by: Robert Brakey
- Music by: Lior Rosner
- Distributed by: Huffington Pictures
- Release dates: July 31, 2014 (Woods Hole Film Festival); December 2, 2016
- Running time: 93 minutes
- Country: United States
- Language: English

Sins of Our Youth is a 2014 thriller/drama film directed by Gary Entin and starring Lucas Till, Joel Courtney, and Mitchel Musso. The film is a cautionary tale that highlights a new generation in the United States that is desensitized by an oversaturation of violence in the mainstream media and who have ready access to firearms.

== Plot ==
Four teenagers, Scott, David, Carlo, and Tyler, accidentally kill a younger boy while shooting off assault weapons recreationally, and make perilous decisions in the aftermath of the murder.

In a moment of desperation, paranoia, and fear that their lives are over, the four teenagers struggle to find a way out. They drunkenly construct a plan reminiscent of a video-game plot. Later, Scott shoots and kills Tyler at a school dance, but is shot and bleeds to death. Police surround the remaining two and Carlo commits suicide. The police think David is reaching for a gun and kill him, only for it to be revealed David was reaching for an inhaler.

== Cast ==
- Lucas Till as Tyler
- Joel Courtney as David
- Mitchel Musso as Scott
- Bridger Zadina as Carlo
- Ally Sheedy as Vicky
- Wesley Eure as Police Chief Kaplan

== Reception ==
The Los Angeles Times criticized the movie saying, "...the idea behind “Sins of Our Youth” appears to have originated in a night of substance abuse." They went on to say, the plot of the movie which was teen drinking and guns leads to death was not surprising.
