= Spy TV =

American hidden camera reality television series

- Directed by: Jeff Boggs; Richard Brian DiPirro; Roy Eisenstein; Wesley Eure
- Presented by: Michael Ian Black; Ali Landry
- Composer: Jim McKeever
- Country of origin: United States
- Original language: English
- No. of seasons: 2
- No. of episodes: 27

Production
- Executive producers: Eric Westmore; Jeff Boggs; John de Mol
- Producers: Brad Bishop; Byl Carruthers; Lisa A. Higgins
- Cinematography: Patrick Higgins
- Editors: Matt Deitrich; William Flicker; Andrew Kozar; Don Misraje; Dan Morando; Rich Remis
- Camera setup: Multi-camera
- Running time: 30 minutes (including commercials)
- Production companies: Endemol USA; Lock and Key Productions; Next Entertainment

Original release
- Network: NBC
- Release: June 21, 2001 – September 28, 2002

Spy TV is an American hidden camera reality television series initially hosted by Michael Ian Black and later by Ali Landry. The show was broadcast on NBC in which pranks were pulled on people by their friends. The show was cancelled after two seasons.
