= Swap Meet (film) =

- Directed by: Brice Mack
- Written by: Steve Krantz
- Produced by: Steve Krantz
- Distributed by: Dimension Pictures
- Release date: September 21, 1979
- Country: United States
- Language: English

Swap Meet is a 1979 American comedy film directed by Brice Mack.

== Cast ==
- Ruth Cox as Nancy
- Debi Richter as Susan
- Danny Goldman as Ziggy
- Cheryl Rixon as Annie
- Jon Gries as Dan Spector
- Danny DeVito as Max the auto body mechanic
- Rhea Perlman as Shoplifting Mother

== Release ==
Swap Meet released to theaters in the United States on September 21, 1979.

== Reception ==
The Los Angeles Times panned the film, saying that it "makes no attempt to be either lifelike or interesting." TV Guide was similarly critical, writing that it was "A real waste of time, this is aimed strictly at the drive-in crowds who aren't concerned with cinematic quality to begin with."
