= Mara of the Wilderness =

1965 film by Frank McDonald

- Theatrical release poster
- Directed by: Frank McDonald
- Written by: Thomas W. Blackburn; Rod Scott
- Produced by: Brice Mack
- Starring: Adam West; Linda Saunders; Theo Marcuse
- Cinematography: Robert Wyckoff
- Edited by: Harold Gordon
- Music by: Harry Bluestone
- Production company: Unicorn Films
- Distributed by: Allied Artists
- Release dates: April 6, 1965 (Las Vegas, Nevada)
- Running time: 90 minutes
- Country: United States
- Language: English

Mara of the Wilderness is a 1965 adventure film directed by Frank McDonald, produced by former Disney animator Brice Mack with his studio Unicorn Films, and starring Adam West, Lori Saunders, and Theodore Marcuse.

== Plot ==
In the contemporary areas of Alaska, Mara Wade (Lori Saunders) is a barefoot mute wild woman whose parents are killed in a Bear attack. Raised by wolves and wearing only a fur dress, she rescues and befriends an anthropologist named Ken Williams (Adam West) who is interested in teaching her what is in the world. But she is hunted as well by a ruthless carnival worker named Jarnagan (Theodore Marcuse) causing Ken to work to keep her safe.

== Cast ==
- Adam West as Ken Williams
- Lori Saunders as Mara Wade (credited as Linda Saunders)
  - Lelia Walsh as Mara Wade - Age Seven
- Denver Pyle as Kelly
- Theodore Marcuse as Jarnagan
- Roberto Contreras as Friday
- Eve Brent as Mrs. Wade
- Ed Kemmer as First Pilot
- Stuart Walsh as Second Pilot
