= Half a House =

- Directed by: Brice Mack
- Written by: Lois Hire
- Starring: Anthony Eisley; Pat Delaney; Francine York; Kaz Garas; Mary Grace Canfield
- Cinematography: Alfred Taylor
- Edited by: Joseph Dervin
- Music by: Sammy Fain
- Production company: First American Films
- Distributed by: Rampart Releasing
- Release date: December 17, 1976
- Running time: 95 min.
- Country: United States
- Language: English

Half a House is a 1976 American comedy film directed by Brice Mack, produced by Lenke Romanszky and released theatrically in the U.S. by Rampart Releasing. It stars Anthony Eisley and Pat Delaney as a separated married couple who divide up living space when they must share their house for three months. The film was also released as House Divided.

== Cast ==
- Anthony Eisley as Jordan Blake
- Pat Delaney as Bitsy Blake
- Francine York as Jessica
- Kaz Garas as Lt. Artie
- Mary Grace Canfield as Thelma
- Angus Duncan as Craig

== Awards ==
Composer Sammy Fain and lyricist Paul Francis Webster were nominated for the Academy Award for Best Original Song for "A World That Never Was." Producer Lenke Romanszky said the primary reason for booking the film in a Beverly Hills theater in 1976 was to qualify the song for Oscars. Prints of the film were scarce and a commercial record was not available, so Fain and Webster set up a phone number with a recording of the song to allow Academy members to call in and hear it. Eddie Albert performed the song on the 49th Academy Awards telecast.

== See also ==
- List of American films of 1976
