= Al Schwartz (writer) =

American screenwriter

Albert "Al" Schwartz
- Born: November 29, 1910; Passaic, New Jersey
- Died: March 25, 1988 (aged 77); Hollywood, California
- Occupation: television writer
- Known for: Emmy award

Albert Schwartz (29 November 1910 – 25 March 1988) was an American screenwriter, television producer, and director.

== Biography ==
He was a writer for The Red Skelton Show, where he and other writers won a Primetime Emmy Award for Outstanding Writing for a Comedy Series in 1961 and were nominated for the same award in 1962. He also wrote scripts for The Jackie Gleason Show, The Milton Berle Show, The Brady Bunch, Gilligan's Island, Petticoat Junction, and other television shows and made-for-TV movies throughout the 1950s, 1960s and 1970s.

Earlier in his career, Schwartz wrote for Bob Hope's radio program, The Pepsodent Show Starring Bob Hope.

He was the brother of Sherwood Schwartz, the creator and producer of Gilligan's Island and The Brady Bunch, and Elroy Schwartz, a comedy and television writer.
