= Tam Spiva =

American screenwriter

- Born: Hubert Tamblyn Spiva, Jr. June 18, 1932; Minden, Louisiana, U.S.
- Died: April 30, 2017 (aged 84); Pacific Palisades, California, U.S.
- Resting place: Westwood Memorial Park
- Occupation: Screenwriter
- Spouses: Martha Farrow (divorced); Laura Lee Dulberger (m. 1964; div. 1975); Phyllis Ellen Resnick (m. 1985)
- Children: 4
- Relatives: E. L. Stewart; William G. Stewart (great-uncles)

Hubert Tamblyn "Tam" Spiva, Jr. (June 18, 1932 – April 30, 2017), was an American television screenwriter best known for his work on The Brady Bunch (ABC, 1969–74) and Gentle Ben (CBS, 1967–69).

== Biography ==
Spiva was born in Minden, Louisiana to Hubert Spiva, Sr. and Lilla Ellenor Stewart. His parents operated the Webster Printing Company, publishing The Minden Herald and The Webster Review newspapers. Lilla is interred with other Stewart relatives at the historic Minden Cemetery.

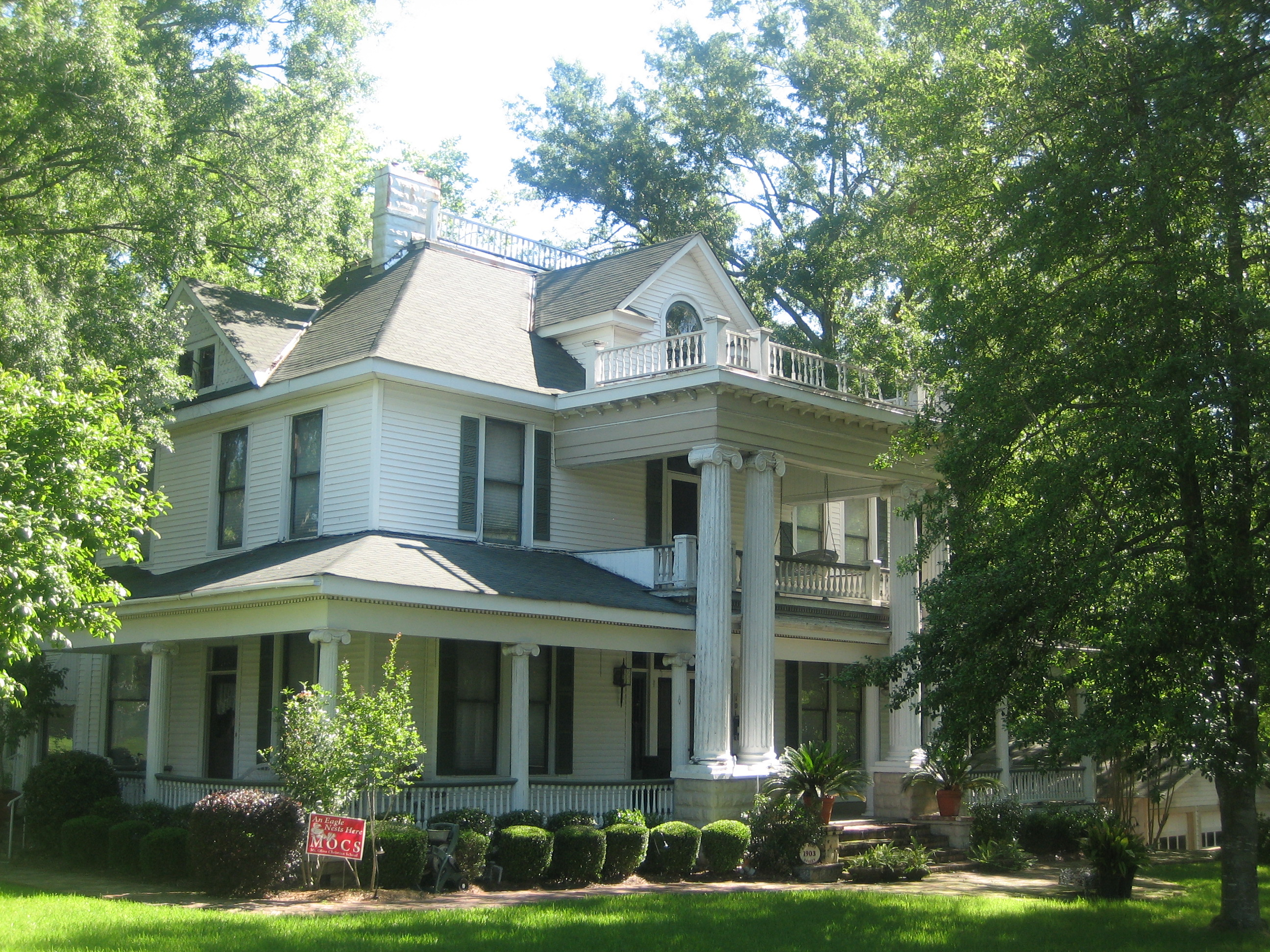
Family home where Spiva grew up in Minden, Louisiana

Spiva began his career as a freelance writer contributing to the 1967 film Island of the Lost. He later became a screenwriter for The Brady Bunch and Gentle Ben, as well as The F.B.I. and Dan August.

Spiva was married three times. His first marriage was to Martha Emily Farrow Brown; the couple had one daughter, Alizon Farrow. Spiva then married Laura Lee Dulberger, a union that produced a daughter, Mary Amanda, and a son, Reagan Anthony. He lived with his third wife, Phyllis Ellen, and stepdaughter, Danielle until his death.

Spiva died on April 30, 2017, in Pacific Palisades, California, at age 84.
