= Lois Hire =

American television writer (1916–2006)

- Born: Mary Lois Elkins; May 24, 1916; Selma, Alabama
- Died: March 5, 2006 (aged 89); Stevenson Ranch, California
- Occupations: TV writer, screenwriter, producer

Lois Hire (1916–2006) was a television writer known for her work on My Three Sons, The Brady Bunch, Bonanza, and The Beverly Hillbillies. She also wrote the 1975 comedy Half a House.

Born Lois Elkins in Selma, Alabama. After graduating from high school, she moved west, first to Reno, Nevada, where she had a brief relationship with Judson Stevens. They had one daughter, who was born in San Francisco in 1936. She moved to Los Angeles during World War II and worked on an aircraft assembly line, where she met her future husband, Argyl F. (Jack) Hire. They had two children, a son and a daughter, both born in Los Angeles. They resided in first Van Nuys (San Fernando Valley), and later in the Encino hills.

She enrolled in a script-writing extension course at Hollywood High School at the age of 44, and one of her instructors passed one of her assignments along to a friend who worked on The Loretta Young Show, where it was accepted and produced in 1960.

Despite reservations from one TV show's sponsors (who told executives they "can't buy a script from some housewife in Van Nuys"), Hire began to get more work, eventually going on to become one of the most prolific female TV writers of the '60s and '70s. She wrote over a dozen episodes of My Three Sons, four episodes of Bonanza, two episodes of The Brady Bunch, and more.

== Writing credits ==
- Young Maverick (TV) (episode "Half-Past Noon) (1980)
- Hello, Larry (TV) (episodes "Ruthie Grows Up: Part 2" and "Peer Pressure") (1979)
- Half a House (1975)
- The Brady Bunch (TV) (episodes "You Can't Win 'Em All" and "Dear Libby") (1969–73)
- My Three Sons (TV) (18 episodes) (1967–1972)
- The Virginian (TV) (episodes "Experiment at New Life" and "You Can Lead a Horse to Water" (1970)
- The Beverly Hillbillies (TV) (episode "Jethro the Flesh Peddler") (1969)
- Family Affair (TV) (episode "Mr. French's Holiday") (1968)
- Pistols 'n' Petticoats (TV) (episodes "The Golden Fleece" and "Bitter Blossom O'Brian") (1966–67)
- The Rounders (TV) (episode "The Moonshine Still Shines") (1966)
- Bonanza (TV) (4 episodes) (1963–65)
- The United States Steel Hour (TV) (episode "The Go-Between) (1962)
- The Loretta Young Show (TV) (episode "Unconditional Surrender") (1960)
