= ProScout =

American model and talent scouting corporation

- Industry: Talent agency
- Founded: 1993

ProScout was an American model and talent scouting corporation. The company was first incorporated in 1993 with its main office in Chicago, Illinois.

ProScout did not represent artists or talent in the traditional role of a talent agency, rather, ProScout acted as a talent pre-screening service and a clearing house which identified and assisted new talent that was interested in meeting with agencies that are generally difficult to meet.
