= It's a Sunshine Day: The Best of the Brady Bunch =

Compilation album by the Brady Bunch
- Released: March 2, 1993
- Recorded: 1970–1977
- Genre: Pop
- Length: 46:15
- Label: MCA
- Producer: Jackie Mills; Charles Koppelman; Tim O'Brien

The Brady Bunch chronology
The Brady Bunch Phonographic Album (1973)	It's a Sunshine Day: The Best of the Brady Bunch (1993)

It's a Sunshine Day: The Best of the Brady Bunch is a compilation album by American pop group the Brady Bunch released on March 2, 1993 by MCA Records.

== Background ==
The Brady Bunch recorded four albums in the early 1970s on Paramount Records: Merry Christmas from the Brady Bunch, Meet the Brady Bunch, The Kids from the Brady Bunch and The Brady Bunch Phonographic Album. There were also various solo singles and a duet album by Christopher Knight and Maureen McCormick. Barry Williams began work on a solo album, but only six tracks were recorded before the album was cancelled. Along with the Christmas album, It's a Sunshine Day: The Best of the Brady Bunch is one of the only Brady Bunch albums currently in print.

In 1974, Paramount sold its record holdings to ABC (the network on which The Brady Bunch had aired). ABC, in turn, sold their record holdings to MCA in 1979.

== Critical reception ==
Professional ratings
Review scores
Source	Rating
AllMusic	4.5/5 stars

"If you have fond memories of watching The Brady Bunch while growing up or if you have all the episodes on tape, there's no escaping it — It's A Sunshine Day: The Best of the Brady Bunch is indispensable" - Stephen Thomas Erlewine for Allmusic.

== Track listing ==
No.	Title	Writer(s)	Original release	Length
1.	"Theme from the Brady Bunch"	Frank De Vol; Sherwood Schwartz	Previously unreleased version	0:58
2.	"Promo Intro"			0:27
3.	"It's a Sunshine Day"	Steve McCarthy	The Kids from the Brady Bunch (1972)	2:31
4.	"We Can Make the World a Whole Lot Brighter"	Michael Gately; Robert John	Meet the Brady Bunch (1972)	2:23
5.	"American Pie"	Don McLean	Meet the Brady Bunch (1972)	3:38
6.	"Born to Say Goodbye" (Florence Henderson solo)	Alan Gordon	Single A-side (1977)	2:53
7.	"Keep On"	Jackie Mills; Thomas Jenkins	The Kids from the Brady Bunch (1972)	2:35
8.	"Time to Change"	Billy Meshel; Christopher Welch; Raymond Bloodworth	Meet the Brady Bunch (1972)	2:08
9.	"Sweet Sweetheart" (Barry Williams solo)	Gerry Goffin; Carole King	Single A-side (1971)	2:38
10.	"I Just Want to Be Your Friend"	Curt Boettcher	Meet the Brady Bunch (1972)	2:27
11.	"Merry-Go-Round"	Brian Neary; Joseph DiMuro	The Kids from the Brady Bunch (1972)	1:58
12.	"Charlotte's Web"	Richard M. Sherman; Robert B. Sherman	The Brady Bunch Phonographic Album (1973)	2:57
13.	"Candy (Sugar Shoppe)"	Gene Rogalski; Jan Erik Lindvald	The Kids from the Brady Bunch (1972)	2:12
14.	"Cheyenne" (Barry Williams solo)	Gary St. Clair; Tim O'Brian	Previously unreleased	3:00
15.	"Road to Love" (Chris Knight and Maureen McCormick duet)	Carol Carmichael	Chris Knight & Maureen McCormick (1973)	3:17
16.	"Gonna Find a Rainbow"	Stephen R. McCarthy	The Brady Bunch Phonographic Album (1973)	2:36
17.	"Truckin' Back to You" (McCormick solo)	St. Clair; O'Brian	Single A-side (1973)	2:51
18.	"Frosty the Snowman"	Jack Rollins; Steve Nelson	Merry Christmas from the Brady Bunch (1970)	1:48
19.	"We'll Always Be Friends"	Danny Janssen; Mills	Meet the Brady Bunch (1972)	2:32
20.	"Promo Outro"			0:13
