= The Brady Bunch Phonographic Album =

Studio album by the Brady Bunch
- Released: June 18, 1973
- Genre: Pop
- Length: 30:40
- Label: Paramount
- Producer: Jackie Mills

The Brady Bunch chronology
The Kids from the Brady Bunch (1973)	The Brady Bunch Phonographic Album (1973)	It's a Sunshine Day: The Best of the Brady Bunch (1993)

Singles from The Brady Bunch Phonographic Album
- 1. "Zuckerman's Famous Pig" Released: April 2, 1973; 2. "Everything I Do" Released: August 1973

The Brady Bunch Phonographic Album is the fourth and final studio album by American pop group the Brady Bunch. It was released on June 18, 1973, by Paramount Records. Original pressings of the album have the title Growing Up with the Brady Bunch on the disc labels. The gatefold album features art-deco stylized framed pictures of the kids in old-timey outfits.

In 1996, the album was released on CD for the first time with the addition of three bonus tracks from 1973's Chris Knight & Maureen McCormick.

== Critical reception ==
Professional ratings
Review scores
Source	Rating
AllMusic	2/5 stars

In the June 30, 1973 issue, Billboard published a review which said: "TV's "other family" is a happy collective blending of rich harmonies and finely honed voices. This is an easy to take collection of pop tunes which will appeal to a specific audience which knows and enjoys this act. All the music is straight out in the open; there are no hidden messages or subliminal effects. Rather the instrumental sound of the orchestra is driving and as modern as can be developed. Producer Jackie Mills has skillfully handled all the components with an affection which is matched by arranger Al Capps who fires up the orchestra". The review noted "I'd Love You to Want Me", "A Simple Man", and "Parallel Lines" as the best cuts on the album, with a note to album dealers that "this act appeals to young kids who are loyal to the TV series and who come out in droves for their concerts".

Cashbox published a review in the July 7, 1973 issue that said: "Those bright eyed, bushy tailed, dimpled darlings from the TV series of the same name are back again with a wonderfully surprising album that should do much to further their career as music performers. Armed with an entourage of solid studio musicians supplying powerful background music, the Bunch delightfully prance through such good timey material as "Summer Breeze", "Charlotte's Web", "I'd Love You to Want Me", and their great "Zuckerman's Famous Pig" single. Classify this one as simply adorable. Check it out".

== Commercial performance ==
The album and its singles did not appear on any music charts. Singles included Zuckerman's Famous Pig (PAA 0205) b/w Charlotte's Web and Everything I Do (PAA 0229) b/w I'd Love You to Want Me.

== Track listing ==
Side one
No.	Title	Writer(s)	Length
1.	"Zuckerman's Famous Pig" (from the motion picture Charlotte's Web)	Richard M. Sherman; Robert B. Sherman	3:03
2.	"I'd Love You to Want Me"	Lobo	3:18
3.	"Colorado Snow"	A. Tucker; J. Rado; A. Hamilton	2:28
4.	"Parallel Lines"	B. Bryan; G. Ballantyne	2:30
5.	"A Simple Man"	Lobo	2:35

Side two
No.	Title	Writer(s)	Length
1.	"Everything I Do"	Craig Fairchild; Tom Dancy	2:38
2.	"Yo-Yo Man"	M. Cooper; R. Cunha	2:27
3.	"Summer Breeze"	J. Seals; D. Crofts	3:12
4.	"Charlotte's Web" (from the motion picture Charlotte's Web)	R.M. Sherman; R.B. Sherman	2:57
5.	"Gonna Find a Rainbow"	Stephen R. McCarthy	2:38
6.	"River Song (Theme from Tom Sawyer)" (from the motion picture Tom Sawyer)	R.M. Sherman; R.B. Sherman	2:54

1996 CD reissue bonus tracks
No.	Title	Writer(s)	Length
12.	"Over and Over" (from Chris Knight & Maureen McCormick)	R. Byrd	2:26
13.	"There Is Nothing More to Say" (from Chris Knight & Maureen McCormick)	C. Boettcher; M. Fennelly; L. Mallary	2:46
14.	"Good for Each Other" (from Chris Knight & Maureen McCormick)	Jackie Mills; D. Mills; Al Capps	2:46
Total length:			38:38

== Personnel ==
Adapted from the album liner notes.

- Al Capps – arrangements
- Barbara Casado – album design
- John Casado – album design
- Chris Knight – vocals
- Mike Lookinland – vocals
- Maureen McCormick – vocals
- Jackie Mills – producer
- Susan Olsen – vocals
- Eve Plumb – vocals
- Albert Watson – photography
- Barry Williams – vocals
- The Funk Brothers – instrumentation
- The Frank de Vol Orchestra – instrumentation
