= Meet the Brady Bunch =

Studio album by the Brady Bunch
- Released: April 17, 1972
- Genre: Pop
- Length: 31:27
- Label: Paramount
- Producer: Jackie Mills

The Brady Bunch chronology
Merry Christmas from the Brady Bunch (1970)	Meet the Brady Bunch (1972)	The Kids from the Brady Bunch (1972)

Singles from Meet the Brady Bunch
- 1. "Time to Change" Released: January 3, 1972; 2. "We'll Always Be Friends" Released: May 1, 1972

Meet the Brady Bunch is the second studio album by American pop group the Brady Bunch. It was released on April 17, 1972, by Paramount Records. Two songs on the album, "We Can Make the World a Whole Lot Brighter" and "Time to Change", were featured on season 3, episode 16 of The Brady Bunch, "Dough Re Mi".

In 1996, the album was released on CD for the first time with the addition of two bonus tracks from 1973's Chris Knight & Maureen McCormick.

== Critical reception ==
Professional ratings
Review scores
Source	Rating
AllMusic	2/5 stars

Billboard published a review in the April 29, 1972 issue that said: "Ask any nine-year-old; this LP is going to be a big hit. 'I Just Want to Be Your Friend' and 'Ain't It Crazy' are probably the key tunes here, but semi-choral versions of 'American Pie' and 'Me and You and a Dog Named Boo' also stand out. The TV show of the Brady Bunch will be the key sales impetus here".

In the April 22 issue, Cashbox published a review which said: "The title is your invitation to sample the singing wares of this popular congregation. The accent is decidedly on the up-tempo and the cheerful as the group romps through 'Me and You and a Dog Named Boo', 'We Can Make the World a Whole Lot Brighter', 'Baby I'm-a Want You', 'Day After Day' and even 'American Pie'. MOR programmers should have a veritable field day with this disk and fans of the Bunch will undoubtedly rush to the local shop for a copy".

== Commercial performance ==
The album peaked at No. 108 on the US Billboard Top LPs & Tape chart. It was the group's only album to chart.

The album's first single, "Time to Change", was released in January 1972 and did not chart. The second single, "We'll Always Be Friends", was released in May 1972 and also failed to chart.

== Track listing ==
Side one
No.	Title	Writer(s)	Length
1.	"We'll Always Be Friends"	Danny Janssen; Jackie Mills	2:37
2.	"Day After Day"	Pete Ham	3:09
3.	"Baby I'm-a Want You"	David Gates	2:42
4.	"I Believe in You"	Janssen; Mills	1:56
5.	"American Pie"	Don McLean	3:39
6.	"Time to Change"	Billy Meshel; Christopher Welch; Raymond Bloodworth	2:08

Side two
No.	Title	Writer(s)	Length
1.	"Me and You and a Dog Named Boo"	Kent LaVoie	3:00
2.	"I Just Want to Be Your Friend"	Curt Boettcher	2:33
3.	"Love My Life Away"	Janssen; Mills	2:28
4.	"Come Run with Me"	James Bryant; Richard Obegi	2:43
5.	"Ain't It Crazy"	Janssen; Mills	2:07
6.	"We Can Make the World a Whole Lot Brighter"	Michael Gately; Robert John	2:25

1996 CD reissue bonus tracks
No.	Title	Writer(s)	Length
13.	"Just a Singin' Alone" (from Chris Knight & Maureen McCormick)	Molly Ann Leikin	3:07
14.	"Tell Me Who You Love" (from Chris Knight & Maureen McCormick)	Eric Hord; Gary Zekley	2:50
Total length:			37:24

== Personnel ==
Adapted from the album liner notes.

- Al Capps – arrangements
- Jim Jenkins – photography
- Chris Knight – vocals
- Mike Lookinland – vocals
- Maureen McCormick – vocals
- Jackie Mills – producer
- Susan Olsen – vocals
- Eve Plumb – vocals
- Barry Williams – vocals
- The Funk Brothers – instrumentation
- The Frank De Vol Orchestra – instrumentation

== Charts ==
Chart (1972)	Peak position
US Top LPs & Tape (Billboard)	108
