= Over and Over (Bobby Day song) =

1958 song by Bobby Day

Single by Bobby Day
- A-side: "Rockin' Robin"
- Released: 1958
- Recorded: 1958
- Genre: Doo-wop
- Length: 2:20
- Label: Class
- Songwriter: Robert James Byrd

Bobby Day singles chronology
| "Rockin' Robin" (1958) | "Over and Over" (1958) | ""The Bluebird, The Buzzard And The Oriole"" (1958) |

"Over and Over"
- American single sleeve.

Single by The Dave Clark Five
- B-side: "I'll Be Yours (My Love)"
- Released: October 22, 1965
- Studio: Lansdowne, London
- Genre: Beat
- Length: 2:00
- Label: Columbia
- Songwriter: Robert James Byrd
- Producer: Dave Clark

The Dave Clark Five UK singles chronology
| "Catch Us If You Can" (1965) | "Over and Over" (1965) | "Try Too Hard" (1966) |

The Dave Clark Five US singles chronology
| "Catch Us If You Can" (1965) | "Over and Over" (1965) | "At The Scene" (1966) |

Audio
- "Over and Over" on YouTube

"Over and Over" is a song written by Robert James Byrd and recorded by him using the stage name Bobby Day. Day's version entered the Billboard Hot 100 in 1958, the same week a version of the same song by Thurston Harris entered the chart. Day's version reached #41, and was the B-side to "Rockin' Robin". Thurston Harris' version peaked at #96. In the song, the singer describes going to a party with misgivings of having a good time, until he sees a pretty girl. The singer attempts to ask her out, but she is waiting for her date to arrive. He vows to try "over and over".

== Dave Clark Five version ==
=== Composition and recording ===
"Over and Over" was the second Bobby Day song the Dave Clark Five recorded, following "Little Bitty Pretty One" from their Weekend in London album. According to Tom Breihan of Stereogum, the Dave Clark Five version of "Over and Over" "strips down" a song that must've sounded "rudimentary even in 1958". The Dave Clark Version features a lyrical rewrite of the original, turning Bobby Day's line "everybody there was stag" into the "utterly inscrutable" “everybody there was there.” Additionally, they omit the final verse of Bobby Day's original.

As with the rest of the Dave Clark Five's output, it was recorded at Lansdowne Studios in London, together with recording engineer Adrian Kerridge. It was produced by Dave Clark himself. According to Clark, he felt the finished recording was "too slow", but didn't want to re-record the track as the "feel was so good". Instead, they put sellotape around the tape recorder's capstan until they achieved the speed Clark was aiming for. This garnered some attention in America, who praised the band for the harmonica sound they achieved on the single.

=== Release and reception ===
"Over and Over" was initially released as a single by Columbia Records in the UK and on Epic Records in the US on October 22, 1965, together with the B-side "I'll Be Yours (My Love)" which would appear on their I Like It Like That studio album. The single became the Dave Clark Five's largest hit in the US, reaching number one on the Billboard Hot 100, Cash Box Top 100 Pop Singles and the Record World 100 Top Pops charts on December 25, 1965. It was the Dave Clark Five's only American number one single. In the UK, the single's commercial success was more muted, as it only reached number 42 on the Melody Maker Pop 50 and number 45 on the Record Retailer singles chart.

Cash Box described it as a "lively, hard-driving rendition" with "a danceable, pulsating beat." Record World said that "The Dave Clark Five go to the top over and over, and 'Over and Over' will be no exception."

=== Weekly charts ===
| Chart (1965–1966) | Peak position |
|---|---|
| Australia (Kent Music Report) | 24 |
| Canada (RPM) | 1 |
| Malaysia (Radio Malaysia) | 3 |
| New Zealand (Listener) | 3 |
| Singapore (Radio Singapore) | 6 |
| Sweden (Kvällstoppen) | 3 |
| Sweden (Tio i Topp) | 2 |
| UK (Melody Maker) | 42 |
| UK (Record Retailer) | 45 |
| US (Billboard Hot 100) | 1 |
| US (Cash Box Top 100) | 1 |
| US (Record World 100 Top Pops) | 1 |
| West Germany (Media Control) | 12 |

=== Year-end charts ===
| Chart (1966) | Peak position |
|---|---|
| US (Cash Box Top 100) | 26 |

== Covers ==
In 1981, Mike Love of The Beach Boys covered the song on his solo album Looking Back With Love. Love recorded it again on his 2019 album 12 Sides of Summer.

French singer Sacha Distel stayed very close to DC5's arrangement and made a hit with his French version entitled "Les Yeux Bleus".

Chris Knight of The Brady Bunch also covered the song on his 1973 album with Maureen McCormick Chris Knight & Maureen McCormick. The track is also featured as a bonus track on the CD reissue of The Brady Bunch's 1973 album The Brady Bunch Phonographic Album.
