= The Brady Kids =

- Genre: Comedy
- Created by: Sherwood Schwartz
- Directed by: Hal Sutherland
- Voices of: Barry Williams; Maureen McCormick; Christopher Knight; Eve Plumb; Mike Lookinland; Susan Olsen; Larry Storch; Jane Webb; Lennie Weinrib; Erika Scheimer; Lane Scheimer
- Composers: Frank DeVol; (theme music); Ray Ellis; (incidental music)
- Country of origin: United States
- Original language: English
- No. of seasons: 2
- No. of episodes: 22

Production
- Executive producer: Sherwood Schwartz
- Producers: Norm Prescott; Lou Scheimer
- Editors: Doreen A. Dixon; Joseph Simon
- Running time: 30 minutes
- Production companies: Filmation; Paramount Television

Original release
- Network: ABC
- Release: September 9, 1972 – October 6, 1973

Related
- The Brady Bunch; The Brady Bunch Hour; Mission: Magic!

The Brady Kids is an American animated television series and a spin-off based on the ABC live-action sitcom The Brady Bunch, produced by Filmation in association with Paramount Television. It aired on ABC from September 9, 1972, to October 6, 1973, and also spun off another Filmation series, Mission: Magic!, starring Rick Springfield.

== Background ==
In 1972, with the live action sitcom The Brady Bunch preparing for the start of its fourth season, show creator and executive producer Sherwood Schwartz approached Filmation about the creation of an animated series featuring the Brady Kids. Filmation agreed, and Lou Schiemer and Norm Prescott (who had later developed Schwartz properties Gilligan's Planet and The New Adventures of Gilligan) headed up the project.

== Characters ==
The original show's six children (Barry Williams, Maureen McCormick, Christopher Knight, Eve Plumb, Mike Lookinland and Susan Olsen) voiced their animated counterparts in the first season. As the series' title implies, the parents and Alice the housekeeper characters were omitted from the show. At the end of the first season, Filmation asked the kids to continue on their existing contracts for another five episodes in a second season. The kids' original answer was no, prodded on by their agent Harvey Shotz. Filmation threatened both to sue the children over breach of contract, and to continue the show without their voices. Knight, Lookinland, Plumb, and Olsen agreed to the extended Filmation contract, but Williams and McCormick did not agree. Williams and McCormick were replaced with Lane Scheimer and Erika Scheimer, the son and daughter of Filmation producer Lou Scheimer.

=== The Bradys ===
- Greg Brady: Barry Williams (season 1), Lane Scheimer (season 2)
- Marcia Brady: Maureen McCormick (season 1), Erika Scheimer (season 2)
- Peter Brady: Christopher Knight (credited as "David E. Smith" in season 2)
- Jan Brady: Eve Plumb
- Bobby Brady: Mike Lookinland
- Cindy Brady: Susan Olsen

=== Other characters ===
- Marlon: Larry Storch
- Ping and Pong: Larry Storch
- Mop Top: Larry Storch
- Chuck White: Larry Storch
- Fleetwood: Larry Storch
- Babs: Jane Webb

=== Crossover with DC comics ===
- Superman: Lennie Weinrib
- Lois Lane: Jane Webb
- Wonder Woman: Jane Webb

== Production ==
While Schwartz originally intended to hand off full editorial control to Schiemer and Prescott, he eventually returned to become an active part of production, reviewing scripts and advising on creative input.

Much of the animation for the series was copied over from another Filmation series, The Archie Show. Walk cycles, profile pictures, and scenes where the Brady kids play in a band were all frame-by-frame replacements for looped frames originally seen of The Archies on The Archie Show. Many of Mop Top's poses were copied from the Archies' character Hot Dog. Mop Top copied Hot Dog's design (from Archie) with the only difference being a pallette change. Fleetwood's poses and walk cycles were often copied from Rudy of Fat Albert and the Cosby Kids.

Originally aired as a one-hour segment on The ABC Saturday Superstar Movie, the pilot episode was split into two half-hour segments on The Brady Kids. A total of 22 episodes were produced. Season 1 aired Saturday mornings from 10:30 to 11:00 AM, and season 2 aired Saturday mornings from 11:00 to 11:30 AM. Season 1 contained 17 episodes, and season 2 contained 5. Season 2 was specifically created by Filmation with the intent on 5 episodes to bring the total count of episodes to 22, the minimum required for syndication. Like most 1970s-era Saturday morning cartoon series as well as The Brady Bunch show itself, The Brady Kids contained an adult laugh track.

The opening sequence in the first season featured the fourth season "grid" familiar to The Brady Bunch viewers, without the center column that is normally occupied by the adults (Mike, Carol and Alice). Near the end of the theme song (featuring new lyrics set to the original Brady Bunch theme complete with a 1970's style piano), Marlon flies up and down the center, "magically" transforming the live-action children into their animated counterparts. The second seasons's intro features Marlon flying up and down the center of an empty blue background to reveal the Brady Kids.

Schwartz would admit that he was not happy with the series in an interview with RetroCrush many years later, stating, "My conversation was to give a new platform that was more imaginative than real life situations, but I didn't find it particularly good, so we stopped it after a year."

== Episodes ==
=== Series overview ===
| Season | Episodes | Originally released | |
| Season | Episodes | First released | Last released |
|---|---|---|---|
| 1 | 17 | September 9, 1972 | December 30, 1972 |
| 2 | 5 | September 8, 1973 | October 6, 1973 |

=== Season 1 (1972) ===
| No. overall | No. in season | Title | Original release date |
|---|---|---|---|
| 1 | 1 | "Jungle Bungle: Part 1" | September 9, 1972 |
The kids, along with Mop Top, enter a balloon race. But their balloon brings the gang to a mysterious island. The first half of The Brady Kids on Mysterious Island, a pilot movie that originally aired on The ABC Saturday Superstar Movie. Song: "Time to Change"
| 2 | 2 | "Jungle Bungle: Part 2" | September 16, 1972 |
While on a mysterious island, the Bradys meet such strange characters as Marlon the mynah, the panda bears Ping and Pong and an abominable snowman. The second half of The Brady Kids on Mysterious Island, a pilot movie that originally aired on The ABC Saturday Superstar Movie. Song: "I Believe in You"
| 3 | 3 | "Double Trouble" | September 23, 1972 |
Peter wishes he looked like movie star Clint Flint, but Marlon's magic morphs Peter's body into Clint's and vice versa. Song: "Ain't It Crazy"
| 4 | 4 | "Long Gone Silver" | September 30, 1972 |
Lone Ranger fan Bobby orders a pin from his hero's fan club. Marlon attempts to turn the pin into real silver, but instead, brings the Lone Ranger's horse to the kids' playhouse. Song: "We'll Always Be Friends"
| 5 | 5 | "Cindy's Super Friend" | October 7, 1972 |
The kids meet Clark Kent and Lois Lane, who help them paint a local bank, but criminal scientist Wily Toulouse La Trick and his henchman Igor replace the kids' paint with invisible paint, allowing the villains to rob the bank; it's up to Superman to save the day. Song: "We Can Make The World a Whole Lot Brighter"
| 6 | 6 | "Pop Goes the Mynah" | October 14, 1972 |
After Marlon is sealed in a can at a soda factory, the kids must rescue him. Song: "Love My Life Away"
| 7 | 7 | "Who Was That Dog?" | October 21, 1972 |
The kids enter their pet friends into a show; MopTop falls in love with a French poodle, but Marlon's magic turns her into a barking woman. Song: "Me and You and a Dog Named Boo"
| 8 | 8 | "It Ain't Necessarily Snow" | October 28, 1972 |
Greg has to learn to ski in order to compete in a race against Chuck. Marlon's magic, however, only makes things worse. Song: "Merry Go Round"
| 9 | 9 | "A Funny Thing Happened on the Way to the End Zone" | November 4, 1972 |
The gang accidentally gets a hold of a spaceship, and winds up befriending some little men from Venus. Song: "Playing the Field"
| 10 | 10 | "That Was No Worthy Opponent, That Was My Sister" | November 11, 1972 |
Greg, Marcia, and Chuck are all running for class President. Chuck manages to sabotage his opponents' campaigns, but the Brady pets teach him a lesson. Song: "Come Run With Me"
| 11 | 11 | "You Took the Words Right Out of My Tape" | November 18, 1972 |
The Bradys try to stop a pair of thieves from stealing the crown jewels. Song: "It's a Sunshine Day"
| 12 | 12 | "Give Me a Home Where the Panda Bears Roam and the Dog and the Mynah Bird Play" | November 25, 1972 |
The kids go on a cattle drive. As usual, Marlon's magic makes a mess of things. Song: "You Need That Rock and Roll"
| 13 | 13 | "It's All Greek to Me" | December 2, 1972 |
Marlon's magic transports the Bradys (and Wonder Woman, who is posing as a mathematician) to ancient Greece, where they meet Euclid. Note: This was the first animated and television appearance of Wonder Woman. Song: "In No Hurry"
| 14 | 14 | "The Big Time" | December 9, 1972 |
When a television talent show comes to town, the kids all create their own individual acts so that they can enter. Song: "Drummer Man"
| 15 | 15 | "Marlon's Birthday Party" | December 16, 1972 |
The Bradys plan a surprise birthday party for Marlon. Unbeknownst to them, Marlon plans to go back in time and spend his birthday with Merlin. The two wizards mistakenly switch places, with Marlon in the past and Merlin in the future. Song: "Candy (Sugar Shoppe)"
| 16 | 16 | "The Richest Man in the World" | December 23, 1972 |
The gang takes pity on a supposedly poor man, not realizing that he is actually Nick L. Dime, the world's wealthiest man. Song: "Keep On Movin'"
| 17 | 17 | "Wings" | December 30, 1972 |
The Bradys enter a road rally. But the Wrong brothers steal parts of the gang's car to make an airplane. Last episode to feature Barry Williams and Maureen McCormick. Song: "Gonna Find a Rainbow"

=== Season 2 (1973) ===
| No. overall | No. in season | Title | Original release date |
|---|---|---|---|
| 18 | 1 | "Frankincense" | September 8, 1973 |
The Bradys try to foil a couple of jewel thieves who have stolen their jewel-hungry robots. First episode to feature Lane Scheimer and Erika Scheimer, who respectively replaced Barry Williams and Maureen McCormick in the roles of Greg and Marcia Brady, and credit Christopher Knight as "David E. Smith". Song: "We'll Always Be Friends"
| 19 | 2 | "Teacher's Pet" | September 15, 1973 |
Cindy wants her own cat, so Marlon asks to borrow fellow wizard Miss Tickle's ceramic cat. The statue comes to life whenever a magic spell is recited. Marlon forgets the spell, and mistakenly turns the cat into a hippopotamus. Note: This episode introduced Miss Tickle, who later appeared in Mission: Magic! with Rick Springfield. Song: "Drummer Man"
| 20 | 3 | "Marcia's Lib" | September 22, 1973 |
The boys and the girls form rival camping groups, both of which get lost in the woods. The Brady kids must work together to find their way back to camp. Song: "I Believe in You"
| 21 | 4 | "Ceiling Zero" | September 29, 1973 |
Marlon brings the famous painter Michael "Angelglow" from the past to help the kids paint their tree house. But when Michael is stolen by art thieves, the Bradys have to track him down so that Marlon can return the artist to his own time. Song: "Love My Life Away"
| 22 | 5 | "Who Believes in Ghosts?" | October 6, 1973 |
The Bradys decide to restore the former home of the deceased Colonel Jones. Thieves hide in the house and attempt to scare the kids off, but the ghost of Colonel Jones has other ideas. Song: "Ain't It Crazy"

== Home media ==
In April 2007, the two-part episodes "Jungle Bungle" were released as bonus features on The Brady Bunch: The Complete Series 21-disc DVD set by CBS and Paramount.

CBS Home Entertainment released The Brady Kids: The Complete Animated Series on DVD in Region 1 in February 2016.

The complete series was re-released on DVD by CBS/Paramount in June 2019 as a part of The Brady-est Brady Bunch TV & Movie Collection to commemorate the 50th anniversary of the original series.
