= Merry Christmas from the Brady Bunch =

Studio album by the Brady Bunch
- Released: November 2, 1970
- Recorded: 1970
- Genre: Pop; Christmas
- Length: 20:43
- Label: Paramount
- Producer: Tim O'Brien

The Brady Bunch chronology
Merry Christmas from the Brady Bunch (1970)	Meet the Brady Bunch (1972)

Singles from Merry Christmas from the Brady Bunch
- 1. "Frosty the Snowman" Released: November 1970

Merry Christmas from the Brady Bunch is the debut studio album by American pop group the Brady Bunch.

It was released on November 2, 1970, by Paramount Records. As its title suggests, the album consists of Christmas standards performed by the children who acted on the ABC sitcom The Brady Bunch.

The album was reissued in 1995 by MCA Records under the title Christmas with the Brady Bunch.

== Critical reception ==
Billboard published a review in the November 14, 1970 issue that said: "With the success of their TV show assured, the Brady Bunch makes their recording debut with a first rate collection of Christmas carols and songs. Their bright and appealing performance of "Jingle Bells", "Santa Claus Is Comin' to Town", and "Rudolph the Red-Nosed Reindeer" are complemented by warm readings of "The Little Drummer Boy", "Silent Night", and "The First Noel". Should prove a solid sales item for this holiday season".

== Track listing ==
Side one
No.	Title	Writer(s)	Lead vocals	Length
1.	"The First Noel"	Traditional	Mike Lookinland	2:29
2.	"Away in a Manger"	Traditional	Maureen McCormick	1:40
3.	"The Little Drummer Boy"	Katherine Kennicott Davis; Henry Onorati; Harry Simeone	Eve Plumb	2:30
4.	"O Come, All Ye Faithful"	Traditional	Group	1:36
5.	"O Holy Night"	Traditional	Barry Williams	2:00
6.	"Silent Night"	Franz Xaver Gruber; Joseph Mohr	Group	1:40

Side two
No.	Title	Writer(s)	Lead vocals	Length
1.	"Jingle Bells"	James Lord Pierpont	Group	1:38
2.	"Frosty the Snowman"	Steve Nelson; Walter E. Rollins	Susan Olsen	1:49
3.	"Silver Bells"	Jay Livingston; Ray Evans	Group	1:44
4.	"Rudolph the Red-Nosed Reindeer"	Johnny Marks	Chris Knight	2:06
5.	"Santa Claus Is Comin' to Town"	J. Fred Coots; Haven Gillespie	Group	1:29
6.	"We Wish You a Merry Christmas"	Traditional	Group	0:40

== Vocalists ==
- Barry Williams
- Maureen McCormick
- Christopher Knight
- Eve Plumb
- Mike Lookinland
- Susan Olsen

== See also ==
- A Partridge Family Christmas Card
