= Gone Country (TV series) =

Country music-centric reality television series

- Judges: John Rich of Big & Rich
- Country of origin: United States
- No. of seasons: 3
- No. of episodes: 16

Production
- Running time: 1 hour including commercials

Original release
- Network: CMT
- Release: January 25, 2008 – March 7, 2009

Gone Country is an American celebrity reality television show in which contestants compete to become a country music singer. The winner gets a country single produced by host John Rich, one-half of the country duo Big & Rich. It aired on CMT, with reruns on TV Land, and VH1. On the first-season finale, Julio Iglesias Jr. was named the winner.

== Contestants ==
=== Season 1 ===
- Bobby Brown – an R&B star of the late 1980s and early 1990s, member of boy band New Edition.
- Maureen McCormick – best known from her role as Marcia Brady from the hit television show The Brady Bunch.
- Diana DeGarmo – American Idol season 3 runner-up and a Broadway actress
- Julio Iglesias Jr. – son of singer Julio Iglesias, brother of Enrique Iglesias, and a soulful dance-pop singer. (Winner)
- Sisqó – Member of the R&B group Dru Hill. He is most widely known for his solo hit, the "Thong Song."
- Dee Snider – lead singer of the 1980s heavy metal band Twisted Sister.
- Carnie Wilson – daughter of Beach Boys front man Brian Wilson, Carnie Wilson was also a member of the pop band Wilson Phillips.

=== Season 2 ===
- Jermaine Jackson – a member of The Jackson 5 alongside brothers Michael, Marlon, Tito and Jackie.
- Chris Kirkpatrick – member of the boy band *NSYNC.
- Sean Young – Appeared in movies such as Ace Ventura: Pet Detective, Fatal Instinct, Wall Street, No Way Out and Blade Runner.
- Mikalah Gordon – American Idol season 4 finalist
- Sebastian Bach – Former lead singer of the glam metal band Skid Row. (Winner)
- Lorenzo Lamas – played "Tom Chisum" in Grease and starred on Falcon Crest, Renegade and The Bold and the Beautiful.
- Irene Cara – played "Coco Hernandez" in the film Fame in 1980 and also is best known for the theme songs for both "Fame" and Flashdance. Left the show in episode 2 after Sean Young's drunken actions during the night.

=== Season 3 ===
- Tara Conner – Miss USA 2006
- Micky Dolenz – former Monkees singer and drummer
- George Clinton – funk master; leader of the band Parliament-Funkadelic
- Richard Grieco – 21 Jump Street actor
- Taylor Dayne – 1980s pop star
- Sheila E. – Drummer and singer (Winner)
- Justin Guarini – American Idol season 1 runner-up

== See also ==
- Outsiders Inn, the 2008 reality television series spin-off featuring McCormick, Brown, and Wilson.
