= Time to Change =

Single by The Brady Bunch
- B-side: "We Can Make the World a Whole Lot Brighter"
- Released: 1972
- Genre: Bubblegum pop
- Length: 2:05
- Label: Paramount
- Songwriters: Raymond Bloodworth, Christopher Welch, Billy Meshel
- Producer: Jackie Mills

"Time to Change" is a 1972 bubblegum pop song from the television sitcom The Brady Bunch performed by The Brady Bunch Kids (composed of the children of the fictional Brady family). The song and another Brady Bunch Kids song, "We Can Make the World a Whole Lot Brighter", were featured in The Brady Bunch episode "Dough Re Mi" which aired on January 14, 1972.

Written by Raymond Bloodworth, Billy Meshel and Chris Welch, "Time to Change" features solos by Barry Williams and Maureen McCormick, who portrayed the Brady's eldest children Greg and Marcia, respectively, on the TV series. The songs featured in this episode marked the on-screen singing debut of Marcia and Bobby (Mike Lookinland).

Within the context of the series, "Time to Change" was devised as a way to incorporate Peter Brady, whose voice started changing due to puberty. The second verse of the song explicitly refers to growing from a child into an adult. The televised version includes an off-key gag line from Peter in the chorus, which was not included on the commercially released single.

"Time to Change" was also featured in The Brady Kids episode "Jungle Bungle: Part 2" which aired on September 16, 1972.

== Releases ==
"Time to Change" was released as The Brady Bunch's second single, with "We Can Make the World a Whole Lot Brighter" as the B-side. The record did not chart.

The original recording of "Time to Change" is on their greatest hits album, It's a Sunshine Day: The Best of the Brady Bunch, and a re-recorded version was released on the soundtrack to A Very Brady Sequel.

== See also ==
- The Brady Bunch
- The Partridge Family
- "I Think I Love You"
- The Archies
