= The Kids from the Brady Bunch =

Studio album by the Brady Bunch
- Released: December 4, 1972
- Recorded: 1972
- Studio: Larrabee Sound Studios (Hollywood)
- Genre: Pop
- Length: 26:21
- Label: Paramount
- Producer: Jackie Mills

The Brady Bunch chronology
Meet the Brady Bunch (1972)	The Kids from the Brady Bunch (1972)	The Brady Bunch Phonographic Album (1973)

Singles from The Kids from the Brady Bunch
- 1. "Candy (Sugar Shoppe)" Released: November 1972

The Kids from the Brady Bunch is the third studio album by American pop group the Brady Bunch. It was released on December 4, 1972, by Paramount Records. Two songs on the album, "It's a Sunshine Day" and "Keep On", were featured on season 4, episode 16 of The Brady Bunch, "Amateur Nite".

In 1996, the album was released on CD for the first time with the addition of three bonus tracks from 1973's Chris Knight & Maureen McCormick.

== Critical reception ==
Professional ratings
Review scores
Source	Rating
AllMusic	2/5 stars

In the December 16, 1972 issue, Billboard published a review that said: "Christmas season should give added sales punch to this LP, which also has a popular television show going for it. Best cuts: "Ben" and "You Need That Rock 'n' Roll". Dealer should also place this in the children's browser box".

== Commercial performance ==
The album and its singles failed to appear on any music charts.

== Track listing ==
Side one
No.	Title	Writer(s)	Length
1.	"Love Me Do"	John Lennon; Paul McCartney	2:02
2.	"It's a Sunshine Day"	Stephen R. McCarthy	2:29
3.	"Keep On"	Jackie Mills; Thomas Jenkins	2:31
4.	"Ben"	Don Black; Walter Scharf	2:38
5.	"Playin' the Field"	Brian Neary; Joseph DiMuro	2:29

Side two
No.	Title	Writer(s)	Length
1.	"Candy (Sugar Shoppe)"	Gene Rogalski; Jan Erik Lindvald	2:10
2.	"In No Hurry"	Craig Fairchild; Tony Dancy	2:32
3.	"Saturday in the Park"	Robert Lamm	2:42
4.	"Merry-Go-Round"	Neary; DiMuro	1:55
5.	"You Need That Rock 'n' Roll"	Don Hull	2:45
6.	"Drummer Man"	Mills; Danny Janssen	2:08

1996 CD reissue bonus tracks
No.	Title	Writer(s)	Length
12.	"Little Bird (Sing Your Song)" (from Chris Knight & Maureen McCormick)	Kenny Nolan	3:01
13.	"Spread a Little Love Around" (from Chris Knight & Maureen McCormick)	Carol Carmichael	2:34
14.	"Hang On, Baby" (from Chris Knight & Maureen McCormick)	Mills; Janssen	2:18
Total length:			34:14

== Personnel ==
Adapted from the album liner notes.

- Al Capps – arrangements
- Chris Knight – vocals
- Bill Levy – art direction
- Mike Lookinland – vocals
- Maureen McCormick – vocals
- Jackie Mills – producer
- Susan Olsen – vocals
- Pacific Eye & Ear – design concept
- Joe Petagno – cover illustrations
- Eve Plumb – vocals
- Lenny Roberts – engineer
- Barry Williams – vocals
- The Funk Brothers – instrumentation
- The Frank de Vol Orchestra – instrumentation
