= Outsiders Inn =

- Starring: Bobby Brown; Maureen McCormick; Carnie Wilson
- Country of origin: United States
- No. of seasons: 1
- No. of episodes: 8

Original release
- Network: CMT
- Release: August 15 – October 3, 2008

Outsiders Inn is an American half-hour reality television show which is a spin-off from Gone Country, but created through the process known as retroscripting. The series debuted on CMT August 15, 2008, where it ran for eight weeks. The series is executive produced by Jay Renfroe and David Garfinkle of Renegade 83 Productions and Sandy Chanley of Productions Partners Inc.

== Details ==
Outsiders Inn follows Maureen McCormick's plans to open a Bed & Breakfast Inn in Newport, Tennessee. As she prepares to launch its opening, Maureen enlists her fellow contestants from Gone Country, Bobby Brown and Carnie Wilson, to help out, with Brown serving as entertainment director and Wilson as the head chef. Each episode chronicles the trio dealing with the rigors of running a bed and breakfast.

== Production ==
The show was filmed at Christopher Place, An Intimate Resort in Newport, Tennessee, where taping began on June 9, 2008 and ended on June 29, 2008.

Episode Two, titled "Pigeon Idol," was shot at Fiddler's Roost in Parrottsville, Tennessee on June 15, 2008, where the celebs judged a talent contest hosted by Ross Mathews from The Tonight Show.

== Episodes ==
No.	Title	Original release date
1	"Outsiders Get Inn"	August 15, 2008
Maureen leases a bed and breakfast in the Great Smoky Mountains of Tennessee and enlists Bobby and Carnie to help out. But when their first guests check in, the amateur innkeepers try to kill them with kindness and stay civil (between the three) at the same time. Meanwhile, Bobby discovers something surprising while hunting for some moonshine.
2	"Pigeon Idol"	August 22, 2008
Ross Mathews asks the trio to serve as judges at a talent contest he is hosting. But as Maureen and Bobby prepare to take part, Carnie starts suffering from an uncomfortable and painful hemorrhoid that could threaten the event when the pain starts to control her mood.
3	"Redneck Honeymoon"	August 29, 2008
Maureen reveals her new Pigeon Manor Honeymoon fantasy package, which comes complete with mud baths, wraps and an on-call masseuse. Maureen and Carnie are tasked with the handling of operating the spa, while Bobby is in charge of making a couple's "fantasy requests" come true. The first couple checking in for the reservation is the Basil's, who appeared on CMT's Redneck Wedding. While Bobby attempts to fulfill the couple's honeymoon fantasies, which includes breakfast in bed, bathing nude in the river, playing in a tub of lime jell-o and witnessing a miracle, Maureen and Carnie must play host to members of the Animal Courtship Association, who just arrived for their annual conference in which the festivities includes an awards ceremony featuring "Best Females in the Animal World" and "Most Romantic Courting Ritual in the Animal World."
4	"Easy As Pie"	September 5, 2008
Maureen asks Bobby to escort guest of the manor to a bear hunt, so he enlists the aid of a local hunter. Meanwhile, the three proprietors prepare for a visit from the Cocke County Welcoming Committee and the mayor, hoping to land a liquor license. In an attempt to win-over the locals, Carnie bakes an apple pie disaster, while Maureen wants to service apple pies from a local apple orchard.
5	"Coon Dogs"	September 12, 2008
A network of "coon dog" owners checks into Pigeon Manor for a local hunting contest. Maureen and Carnie are overwhelmed by the special requests and unsavory needs of this bizarre group. Bobby is not happy --- he only likes little dogs. The three discuss what to do about "doggie guests" at the inn because Maureen thinks the previous animals at the inn were a bad experience. She wants to begin a 'no pet rule' which means she has to figure out where to put the dogs. Carnie suggests rigging up a place for them to stay on the veranda. Bobby prefers they be far away.
6	"And You Are?"	September 19, 2008
A therapist is coming to the Inn to treat a group of patients. The patients turn out to be celebrity impersonators suffering from identity crises. Unaware that the inn is run by actual celebrities, confusion sets in among the patients, the doctor and the locals regarding the legitimacy of Bobby, Maureen and Carney's identities. The therapist offers Maureen an opportunity to deal with lingering identity issues from her years of playing "Marcia Brady" on The Brady Bunch.
7	"Night on the Town"	September 26, 2008
When Bobby is asked to perform at a concert in Detroit, he takes Leroy along for an eye-opening adventure. Meanwhile, Maureen and Carnie go out for a Cocke County-style night on the town with Mike and Todd.
8	"Family Feud"	October 3, 2008
In this final episode, Pigeon Manor plays host to its first wedding, but it does not go off without a hitch. It is also discovered that the bride and groom represent the Dotson and Starr families, who are embroiled in a longstanding feud. After making this discovery, Maureen, Carnie and Bobby decide to keep the families on separate floors to keep tempers from flaring, however problems continue to plague the three as they prepare for the wedding.
