= A Very Brady Musical =

- Music: Hope Juber; Laurence Juber
- Book: Lloyd J. Schwartz; Hope Juber
- Basis: The Brady Bunch
- Premiere: June 6, 2008: Los Angeles, California, U.S.

A Very Brady Musical is an American stage musical that debuted in Los Angeles in 2008. The show was written by Lloyd J. Schwartz and his sister Hope Juber. The music was written by Hope Juber and her husband Laurence Juber.

Lloyd J. Schwartz directed the production, which starred his wife, Barbara Mallory and his son Elliot Schwartz as Carol and Greg Brady. A Very Brady Musical swept the Valley Theatre League Awards as best production, best musical, best director for Schwartz, best writing for Schwartz and Hope Juber, among other awards.

== Critical reception ==
Variety wrote "Following the trend that every old film or TV show apparently must be made into a musical, “A Very Brady Musical” makes a reasonably successful transition, considering the kids on the original program used to sing occasionally, anyway. The music and lyrics by Hope Juber and Laurence Juber are generally tuneful and clever, Lloyd J. Schwartz and Hope Juber’s book is witty, and Schwartz’s direction of an able cast is resourceful. This world premiere at Theater West should entertain those who grew up watching the titular tots, though the risque nature of the humor makes it surprisingly inappropriate for young children now."

BroadwayWorld called A Very Brady Musical "A fresh, charming, nostalgic piece featuring the beloved Brady Bunch characters in a delightful ninety minutes of family fun."
