= The Brady Bunch =

American sitcom (1969–1974)

- Genre: Sitcom
- Created by: Sherwood Schwartz
- Showrunner: Sherwood Schwartz
- Starring: Robert Reed; Florence Henderson; Ann B. Davis; Maureen McCormick; Eve Plumb; Susan Olsen; Barry Williams; Christopher Knight; Mike Lookinland
- Theme music composer: Frank De Vol; Sherwood Schwartz
- Opening theme: "The Brady Bunch" performed by Peppermint Trolley Company (pilot); Paul Parrish, John Beland and Lois Fletcher (season 1); The Brady Bunch Kids (seasons 2–5)
- Composer: Frank De Vol
- Country of origin: United States
- Original language: English
- No. of seasons: 5
- No. of episodes: 117 (list of episodes)

Production
- Executive producer: Sherwood Schwartz
- Producers: Howard Leeds; Sherwood Schwartz; Lloyd J. Schwartz
- Camera setup: Single-camera
- Running time: 25–26 minutes
- Production companies: Redwood Productions; Paramount Television

Original release
- Network: ABC
- Release: September 26, 1969 – March 8, 1974

Related
- The Brady Kids; The Brady Bunch Hour

The Brady Bunch is an American sitcom created by Sherwood Schwartz that aired five seasons from September 26, 1969, to March 8, 1974, on ABC. The series revolves around a large blended family of six children, with three boys and three girls, that also featured an ensemble cast, starring Robert Reed, Florence Henderson, as Mike and Carol Brady and Ann B. Davis as Alice Nelson, the housekeeper. After its cancellation in 1974, the series debuted in syndication in September 1975. Though it was never a ratings hit or a critical success during its original run, the program has since become a popular syndicated staple, especially among children and teenage viewers.

The Brady Bunch's success in syndication led to several television reunion films and spin-off series: The Brady Bunch Hour (1976–77), The Brady Girls Get Married (1981), The Brady Brides (1981), A Very Brady Christmas (1988), and The Bradys (1990). In 1995, the series was adapted into a satirical comedy theatrical film titled The Brady Bunch Movie, followed by A Very Brady Sequel in 1996. A second sequel, The Brady Bunch in the White House, aired on Fox in November 2002 as a made-for-television film.

In 1997, "Getting Davy Jones" (season three, episode 12) was ranked number 37 on TV Guide's 100 Greatest Episodes of All Time. The show's enduring popularity has resulted in its widespread recognition as an American cultural icon.

== Premise ==
Mike Brady, a widowed architect with three sons—Greg, Peter, and Bobby—marries Carol Martin, who herself has three daughters: Marcia, Jan, and Cindy. Mike and Carol adopt each other's children and Carol and her daughters take the Brady surname. Included in the blended family are Mike's live-in housekeeper, Alice Nelson, and the boys' dog, Tiger. (In the pilot episode, the girls also have a pet: a cat named Fluffy who never appears in any other episodes.) The setting is a large two-story house designed by Mike, located in a Los Angeles suburb. The show never addressed what happened to Carol's first husband. While show creator Sherwood Schwartz always intended for Carol to be divorced from her first husband, ABC preferred for her to be widowed due to the more conservative American stance on marriage at the time the first episode aired in 1969, which led to a compromise that resulted in not revealing the first husband's fate on the show. However, other factors also prevented Carol from being revealed as being divorced on the show as well, such as the potential portrayal of both custody arrangement and explanations for the divorce, with Mike, who was able to adopt Carol's daughters, always being portrayed as the only father Carol's daughters accepted.

In the first season, awkward adjustments, accommodations, gender rivalries, and resentments inherent in blended families dominate the storylines. The show being centered on a blended family household was considered unique for the time, as most other shows were still focused on single family households. In an early episode, Carol tells Bobby that the only "steps" in their household lead to the second floor (in other words, that the Bradys are not a "stepfamily", only "a family"). Thereafter, episodes focus on typical teen and preteen concerns such as sibling rivalry, puppy love, self-image, character building, responsibility, dating, school grades and getting along in social company. Noticeably absent is any political commentary, especially regarding the Vietnam War, which was being waged at its largest extent during the height of the series. Despite some elements of the show being considered revolutionary for its time, including Mike and Carol's sleeping arrangements, The Brady Bunch would maintain traditional family-friendly entertainment and avoided scandalous and challenging fare.

== Episodes ==
Season	Episodes	Originally released		
Season	Episodes	First released	Last released	Network
1	25	September 26, 1969	March 20, 1970	ABC
2	24	September 25, 1970	March 19, 1971	ABC
3	23	September 17, 1971	March 10, 1972	ABC
4	23	September 22, 1972	March 23, 1973	ABC
5	22	September 14, 1973	March 8, 1974	ABC

== Cast and characters ==
=== Main ===
The regular cast appears in an opening title sequence in which video "headshots" are arranged in a three-by-three grid, with cast members appearing to look around at one another. The sequence used the then-new "multi-dynamic image technique" created by Canadian filmmaker Christopher Chapman; as a result of the popular attention it garnered in this sequence, it was referred to in the press as "the Brady Bunch effect". In a 2010 issue of TV Guide, the show's opening title sequence ranked number eight on a list of TV's top-10 credits sequences, as selected by readers.

Cast of The Brady Bunch in the signature three-by-three grid featured in the show open. Click on a character for the actor's biography.

- Robert Reed as Mike Brady
- Florence Henderson as Carol Brady
- Ann B. Davis as Alice Nelson
- Maureen McCormick as Marcia Brady
- Eve Plumb as Jan Brady
- Susan Olsen as Cindy Brady
- Barry Williams as Greg Brady
- Christopher Knight as Peter Brady
- Mike Lookinland as Bobby Brady

=== Recurring characters ===
- Sam Franklin (Allan Melvin) is Alice's boyfriend. He is the owner of a local butcher shop. Sam appears in only eight episodes, but they span all five seasons. He is also frequently mentioned in dialogue, and Alice occasionally goes on dates with him off-screen. By the time of the 1981 made-for-TV film The Brady Girls Get Married, Alice and Sam are married.
- Tiger the dog — the original dog that played Tiger died early in the first season. A replacement dog proved problematic, so the producers decided the dog would appear only when essential to the plot. Tiger appeared in about half the episodes in the first season and about half a dozen episodes in the second season. Tiger was not shown again after "The Impractical Joker", but his doghouse remained in the back yard for the entire run of the series.
- Mr. Phillips (Jack Collins) is Mike's boss at the architectural firm. He appears only in season two, in three episodes, but is often mentioned in other episodes when work-related issues occur.
- Cousin Oliver (Robbie Rist) — in the middle of season five, producers added a new character named Oliver, Carol Brady's young nephew, who is sent to live with the Bradys while his parents are living in South America. The character was added in an attempt to fill the age gap left by the maturing Brady children — the youngest (Susan Olsen) was 12 years old during the show's final season. Lloyd Schwartz, son of creator and executive producer Sherwood Schwartz, later admitted that the character threw off the balance of the show. Fans disliked the character of Oliver, regarding him as an interloper. Oliver appears in the final six episodes of season five, which proved to be the final season, as ABC cancelled the series in 1974. The addition of the character has been cited as the moment the series "jumped the shark". The term "Cousin Oliver Syndrome" has since been used to describe the failed attempt to save a series from cancelation by adding a new character.

=== Notable guest stars ===
- Herbert Anderson as Dr. Cameron, a doctor who comes to treat the boys' measles in "Is There a Doctor in the House?" (season one).
- Melissa Sue Anderson played Millicent, a girl who gives Bobby his first kiss ("Never Too Young", season five).
- Desi Arnaz Jr. meets Marcia, who wrote about him in her diary in "The Possible Dream" (season one).
- Jim Backus appears three times in the series, twice in two of the three Grand Canyon episodes, "Ghost Town U.S.A." and "Grand Canyon or Bust", playing Zaccariah T. Brown, who mistakenly thinks the Bradys are jumping his gold claim and locks them in a ghost-town jail; and in "The Hustler" (season five) playing Mike's second boss, Mr. Harry Matthews.
- Ken Berry played Ken Kelly, the Bradys' new neighbor who is the adoptive father of three diverse boys (black, white, and Asian) in the season five episode "Kelly's Kids". Sherwood Schwartz was attempting to sell a spin-off series called Kelly's Kids featuring Berry, but the show idea failed to interest ABC.
- Imogene Coca plays the Brady girls' great-aunt Jenny, whom Jan fears she will grow up to resemble after seeing a childhood photo of her in "Jan's Aunt Jenny" (season three).
- Jackie Coogan plays Harry Duggan, a man who tries to get money out of Carol Brady by faking an injury after a minor parking lot fender-bender.
- Don Drysdale tries to inject reality into Greg's dreams of being a professional baseball player in "The Dropout" (season two).
- Nicholas Hammond as Doug Simpson, the popular school hunk Marcia was dating in "The Subject Was Noses". (season four)
- Don Ho meets Cindy and Bobby and serenades Cindy in Honolulu in "Hawaii Bound" (part one of a three-part season-four episode), filmed on location in Hawaii.
- Davy Jones (of The Monkees) performs at a music studio and then takes Marcia to her school dance in "Getting Davy Jones" (season three). Decades later, Jones satirized his cameo in The Brady Bunch Movie.
- Deacon Jones encourages Peter's singing in "The Drummer Boy" (season two).
- Kym Karath as Kerry Hathaway, a girl Peter woos in "Cyrano de Brady" (season four).
- Bart La Rue plays a football coach in "The Drummer Boy" (season two) and "Click" (season three).
- E. G. Marshall is J.P. Randolph, Marcia's school principal, in "The Slumber Caper" (season two).
- Brigadier General James McDivitt (NASA astronaut) signs autographs for Peter and Bobby after appearing on a talk show in "Out of This World" (season five).
- Burt Mustin plays Jethroe Collins, the son of a victim of Jesse James, invited over by Mike Brady to help Bobby understand the truth about Jesse James.
- Joe Namath visits Bobby after Cindy contacts him saying Bobby has a terminal illness in "Mail Order Hero" (season five).
- Denise Nickerson as Pamela Phillips, niece of Mike Brady's boss, Ed Phillips, whom Peter dates at Mike's request in "Two Petes in a Pod" (season five).
- Wes Parker meets Mike and Greg in Greg's math classroom, thus curing Greg of the crush he had on his teacher Miss Linda O'Hara (played by Gigi Perreau), Parker's fiancée in "The Undergraduate" (season one).
- Vincent Price appears twice in the series in two of the three Hawaii episodes, "Pass the Tabu", and "The Tiki Caves" from season four, playing the villainous Professor Hubert Whitehead, who holds the Brady boys hostage.
- Marion Ross appears as Dr. Porter, a doctor who comes to treat the girls' measles in "Is There a Doctor in the House?" (season one).
- Natalie Schafer is Mike's fussy client, Penelope Fletcher, who is charmed by Cindy's impromptu 'Shirley Temple' routine in "The Snooperstar" (season five).
- Hal Smith appears as Santa Claus in "The Voice of Christmas" (season one), and as Kartoon King in "The Winner" (season two).
- Marcia Wallace plays a salesclerk in "Would the Real Jan Brady Please Stand Up" (season two) and Mrs. Robbins in "Getting Davy Jones" (season three).
- Rita Wilson began her career with a guest appearance in "Greg's Triangle" (season four) where she plays one of the candidates running against Marcia for head cheerleader.
- Paul Winchell appears as Skip Farnum, the TV commercial director in "And Now a Word From Our Sponsor" (season three).

== Production ==
=== Development ===
In 1966, following the success of his TV series Gilligan's Island, Sherwood Schwartz conceived the idea for The Brady Bunch after reading in the Los Angeles Times that "30% of marriages [in the United States] have a child or children from a previous marriage". He set to work on a pilot script for a series tentatively titled Mine and Yours. Schwartz then developed the script to include three children for each parent. While Mike Brady is depicted as being a widower, Schwartz originally wanted the character of Carol Brady to have been a divorcée, but the network objected to this. A compromise was reached whereby Carol's marital status (whether she was divorced or widowed) was never directly revealed.

Schwartz shopped the series to the "big three" television networks of the era. ABC, CBS, and NBC all liked the script, but each network wanted changes before they would commit to filming, so Schwartz shelved the project. Although similarities exist between the series and two 1968 theatrical release films, United Artists' Yours, Mine and Ours (starring Henry Fonda and Lucille Ball) and CBS's With Six You Get Eggroll (starring Brian Keith and Doris Day), the original script for The Brady Bunch predated the scripts for both of these films. Nonetheless, the outstanding success of Yours, Mine and Ours (the 11th-highest-grossing film of 1968) was a factor in ABC's decision to order episodes for the series.

After receiving a commitment for 13 weeks of television shows from ABC in 1968, Schwartz hired film and television director John Rich to direct the pilot, then called "The Brady Brood", cast the six children from 264 interviews during that summer, and hired the actors to play the mother, father, and housekeeper roles. The hair colors of the parents were intended to be contrasting from the beginning, so Schwartz intended to keep in reserve three blonde boys, three brunette boys, three blonde girls and three brunette girls until the parents' actors would be confirmed. For the part of the father, Schwartz originally cast Bob Holiday, who was well known for portraying Superman in a Broadway musical, but since Holiday had little on-camera experience, network executives overrode Schwartz's decision; also considered was Gene Hackman, who, however, was largely unknown at the time, so in the end, the role was given to TV veteran Robert Reed, because he was already under contract to Paramount and he had name recognition from The Defenders. For the mother's role, comedic actress Joyce Bulifant was close to be cast, to play a somewhat wacky mom. She already did some of the screen tests with the various child actors, in fact, Eve Plumb was cast because of her resemblance to Bulifant. However, after comedic actress Ann B. Davis was cast as the housekeeper, she was deemed to be "more than wacky enough", and a more grounded, down-to-earth mother was needed to maintain a balance, so Florence Henderson was cast instead. As the sets were built on Paramount Television stage 5, adjacent to the stage where H.R. Pufnstuf was filmed by Sid and Marty Krofft, who later produced The Brady Bunch Hour, the production crew prepared the backyard of a home in Sherman Oaks, Los Angeles, as the exterior location for the chaotic backyard wedding scene. Filming of the pilot began on Friday, October 4, 1968, and lasted eight days.

=== Theme song and credits sequence ===
The theme song, written by Schwartz and Frank De Vol, and originally arranged, sung, and performed by Paul Parrish, Lois Fletcher, and John Beland under the name the Peppermint Trolley Company, quickly communicated to audiences that the Bradys were a blended family. As described above, the Brady family is shown in a three-by-three grid, tic-tac-toe board-style graphic with Carol in the top center, Alice in the middle block, and Mike in the bottom center. To the right are three blocks with the boys from the oldest on top to the youngest. To the left are three blocks with the girls from the oldest to the youngest. In season two, the Brady kids took over singing the theme song. In season three, the boys sing the first verse, the girls sing the second verse, and all sing together for the third and last verse. In season four, a new version is recorded with the same structure as the season three version, but in season five, the season three version returns. Utilizing Christopher Chapman's "multi-dynamic image technique", a version of which had famously appeared in the 1968 film The Thomas Crown Affair, the sequence was created and filmed by Howard A. Anderson Jr., a visual effects pioneer who worked on the title sequences for many popular television series. The use of this innovation here became so familiar through the sitcom's popularity that it was referred to in the press as the "Brady Bunch effect".

The end credits feature an instrumental version of the theme song's third verse. In season one, it was recorded by the Peppermint Trolley Company. From season two on, the theme was recorded in-house by Paramount musicians.

=== The Brady house ===
The house built in 1959, by Harry M. Londelius Jr., and used in exterior shots, is located in Studio City, within the city limits of Los Angeles. It originally bore little relation to the interior of the Bradys' on-screen home, but was gutted and renovated in 2018 to match the layout of the soundstage sets. According to a 1994 article in the Los Angeles Times, the San Fernando Valley house was built in 1959 and selected as the Brady residence because series creator Schwartz felt it looked like a home where an architect would live. A false window was attached to the front's A-frame section to give the illusion that it had two full stories (the 2018/19 renovation installed a real window where the false one was in the TV show footage). Contemporary establishing shots of the house were filmed with the owner's permission for the 1990 TV series The Bradys. The owner refused to allow Paramount to restore the property to its 1969 look for The Brady Bunch Movie in 1995, so a facade resembling the original home was built around an existing house.

The house was put up for sale, for the first time since 1973, in the summer of 2018 with an asking price of $1.885 million. Cable network HGTV outbid seven others for it, including NSYNC's Lance Bass. HGTV has expanded the home for its original series A Very Brady Renovation, with the goal of recreating each of the interior rooms used in the TV series (which had only existed as a Paramount Studios set) while maintaining the original exterior look from the street, and to make it fully habitable (unlike the sets made on Paramount soundstage #5). The six actors who played the TV children, and who also actively participated in the 2018/19 renovation, posed for a photo in front on November 1 the same year. In May 2023, it was announced that HGTV was selling the house for $5.5 million. The house was bought on September 11, 2023, by media executive Tina Trahan, the wife of former HBO chief executive Chris Albrecht and a longtime fan of the show, for $3.2 million. She said she will leave the house as is and not renovate nor update it, and no one will be living in the house, and plans to use it for charity events and fundraisers. On March 4, 2026, the Los Angeles City Council voted to designate the house a Los Angeles Historic-Cultural Monument.

In the series, the address of the house was given as 4222 Clinton Way (as read aloud by Carol from an arriving package in the first-season episode entitled "Lost Locket, Found Locket", and "Clinton Way" is clearly legible on Marcia's driver permit in the fifth-season episode "The Driver's Seat"). Although no city was ever specified, it was presumed from references to the Los Angeles Dodgers, the Los Angeles Rams, and a Hollywood film studio, among many others, that the Bradys lived in Southern California, most likely Los Angeles or one of its suburbs. Episode 2: Dear Libby, revealed that Brady's live "2000 miles away" from Illinois, which is same as the distance between Illinois and California. Episode 5: My Sister, Benedict Arnold, has Sheri Cowart, who played Kathy Lawrence doing a cheer implying Greg and Marcia went to Fillmore Junior High. This school, known more formally as, "Fillmore Middle School" would probably imply the Brady family lived in Fillmore, California.

The interior sets of the Brady house were used at least three times for other Paramount TV shows while The Brady Bunch was still in production: twice for Mannix and once for Mission: Impossible. In the case of Mission: Impossible, the Brady furniture was also used. A re-creation of the Brady house was constructed for the X-Files episode "Sunshine Days", which also revolved around The Brady Bunch.

=== Production ===
The assistant director on many episodes was future film director Alan Rudolph.

== Broadcast and syndication ==
Since its first syndicated airing in September 1975, an episode of the show has been broadcast somewhere in the United States and abroad every day of the year. Episodes were also shown on ABC Daytime from July 9, 1973, to April 18, 1975, and from June 30 to August 29, 1975, at 11:30 a.m. EST/10:30 CST.

The show aired on TBS starting in the 1980s until 1997, Nickelodeon (as part of the Nick at Nite block in 1995 for a special event, and again from 1998 to 2003 and briefly during the spring of 2012), Noggin (as part of The N block from March to April 2004), TV Land from 2002 to 2015, Nick Jr. Channel (as part of the NickMom block from 2012 to 2013), and Hallmark Channel from January to June 2013 and again starting September 5–30, 2016.

=== Current airings ===
U.S. Since its national launch in 2010, the Weigel Broadcasting–owned classic-TV network MeTV has aired a weekly block of the show every Sunday morning promoted as the "Brady Brunch". MeTV's sister network Catchy Comedy airs the show weekday mornings at 8:00 AM EST and Saturdays from 1:00-3:00 PM EST.

International In West Germany, the show premiered on ZDF under the name Drei Mädchen und drei Jungen ("Three Girls and Three Boys") on August 8, 1971, with episode six "A Clubhouse Is Not a Home", and was shown on Sunday afternoons until halfway through Season 4, culminating with episode 77 "Cyrano De Brady" on October 5, 1974. Some episodes were omitted. From 1984 to 1998, reruns would sporadically occur on Sat.1. The later reunion show, "The Brady Girls Get Married/The Brady Brides" would be broadcast on ZDF as Eine Reizende Familie ("A Lovely Family") from October 18, 1984, to January 10, 1985. The second half of Season 4, Season 5 and the omitted episodes would not premiere before 1997 on Comedy & Co.

In Italy, under a RAI-Paramount deal, eight episodes were broadcast on Programma Nazionale (today RAI 1) from April 27 to June 15, 1973, under the name Album di famiglia. In the late-70s, it would be shown again in Italian dub on Swiss and Istrian networks. Years later, RAI bought the distribution rights again, and the show began airing on Rai 1 and later Rai 3 under the name La famiglia Brady (The Brady Family) starting on March 11, 1987. It was later bought by Fininvest, that aired it on Italia 1 from July 9, 1990, and on Canale 5 from January 5, 1991.

ITV broadcast the show in a number of United Kingdom regions, including Thames, Granada, Tyne Tees, Grampian and Ulster from 1975 to 1982.

Streaming

The Brady Bunch is also available through video-on-demand services Hulu and Paramount+, although neither streamer offers the complete collection of episodes in its entirety. It was shown dubbed in Argentina under the name "La tribu Brady".

== Home media ==
Paramount Home Entertainment released all five seasons on DVD in Region 1 from 2005 to 2006, before CBS Home Entertainment took over DVD rights to the Paramount Television library (though CBS DVD releases are still distributed by Paramount). Paramount/CBS has released the series on DVD in other countries as well.

In April 2007, CBS Home Entertainment and Paramount Home Entertainment released the complete series box set, which includes the TV films A Very Brady Christmas and "The Brady 500" (an episode of The Bradys), as well as two episodes of The Brady Kids animated series. The box art for this set features green shag carpeting and 1970s-style wood paneling.

8 years later on April 7, 2015, CBS Home Entertainment and Paramount Home Entertainment re-released the complete series box set, a repackaged version at a lower price, but it does not include the bonus disc that was part of the original complete series release.

The TV film A Very Brady Christmas was released as a stand-alone DVD in Region 1 on October 10, 2017.

In conjunction with the 50th anniversary of the original series, CBS/Paramount released The Brady-est Brady Bunch TV & Movie Collection in Region 1 on June 4, 2019. The collection contains every episode of The Brady Bunch, The Brady Kids, The Brady Brides, and The Bradys, as well as the films A Very Brady Christmas, The Brady Bunch Movie, A Very Brady Sequel, The Brady Bunch in the White House, and Growing Up Brady.

The first two seasons are also available on Region 2 DVD for the UK, with audio in English and subtitle choices in Norwegian, Swedish, Danish, or Finnish.

The series has also been released on VHS.

DVD name	Episodes	Release dates			
DVD name	Episodes	Region 1	Region 2	Region 4	DVD Special Features
The Complete First Season	25	March 1, 2005	August 27, 2007	September 19, 2007	Audio Commentary on 4 Selected Episodes. 15 min Behind the scenes Feature; Special features are on the Region 1 release only
The Complete Second Season	24	July 26, 2005	March 24, 2008	March 6, 2008	None
The Complete Third Season	23	September 13, 2005	N/A	September 4, 2008	None
The Complete Fourth Season	23	November 1, 2005	N/A	April 2, 2009	None
The Complete Final Season	22	March 7, 2006	N/A	June 18, 2009	None
The Complete Series	117 (with extras)	April 3, 2007; April 7, 2015 (re-release)	N/A	N/A	Audio Commentary on 4 Selected (Season One) Episodes. 15 min Behind the scenes Feature (Season One); A Very Brady Christmas "The Brady 500"; Two episodes of The Brady Kids
The Brady Kids: The Complete Series	22	February 16, 2016	N/A	August 6, 2016	Episode Promos
A Very Brady Christmas	Film	October 10, 2017	N/A	N/A	None
The Brady-est Brady Bunch TV & Movie Collection	50th Anniversary Collection	June 4, 2019	N/A	N/A	The Brady Bunch: The Complete Series; The Brady Kids: The Complete Series; The Brady Brides: The Complete Series; A Very Brady Christmas; The Bradys: The Complete Series; The Brady Bunch Movie; A Very Brady Sequel; The Brady Bunch in the White House; Growing Up Brady

== Reception ==
=== U.S. television ratings ===
Season	Episodes	Originally released		Rank (Nielsen ratings)	Rating
Season	Episodes	First released	Last released	Rank (Nielsen ratings)	Rating
1	25	September 26, 1969	March 20, 1970	56	14.9
2	24	September 25, 1970	March 19, 1971	N/A	N/A
3	23	September 17, 1971	March 10, 1972	31	19.3 (Note: Tied with Mission: Impossible.)
4	23	September 22, 1972	March 23, 1973	45	17.8
5	22	September 14, 1973	March 8, 1974	54	16.1 (Note: Tied with Chase.)

Ratings data prior to 1972 is scarce for shows that did not place in the Top 30. Beginning in 2017, The TV Ratings Guide began publishing vintage television ratings as they became readily available from old newspaper publishings. Season 4 ratings came from Variety year-end rankings dated May 30, 1973. The Brady Bunch earned steady ratings during its primetime run (but never placed in the top 30 during the five years it aired) and was cancelled in 1974 after five seasons and 117 episodes; it was cancelled shortly after the series crossed the minimum threshold for syndication. At that point in the storyline, Greg graduated from high school and was about to enroll in college.

=== Awards and honors ===
The Brady Bunch was not an award-winning show at the time of its original broadcast in the 1970s. The series and its cast and crew were not nominated for an award until 1989, when Barry Williams was honored with the Former Child Star Lifetime Achievement Award at the 10th Youth in Film Awards.

All other awards and nominations for the series have come from the TV Land Awards:

TV Land Awards
Year	Category	Recipient	Result
2003	Hippest Fashion Plate – Male	Barry Williams	Nominated
2003	Favorite Dual-Role Character	Christopher Knight (as Peter Brady and Arthur)	Nominated
2003	Funniest Food Fight	The Brady Pie Fight on the Paramount Lot	Nominated
2003	Favorite Guest Performance by a Musician on a TV Show	Davy Jones	Won
2003	Most Memorable Male Guest Star in a Comedy as Himself	Joe Namath	Won
2004	Favorite Fashion Plate – Male	Barry Williams	Nominated
2004	Most Memorable Mane	Susan Olsen	Nominated
2004	Favorite Made-for-TV Maid	Ann B. Davis	Won
2005	Theme Song You Just Cannot Get out of Your Head	The Brady Bunch theme	Nominated
2005	Best Dream Sequence	Episode: "Love and the Older Man", in which Marcia has a crush on her dentist.	Nominated
2005	Favorite Two-Parter/Cliffhanger	For the Greg Brady surfboard accident.	Nominated
2005	Favorite Singing Siblings	Williams, McCormick, Knight, Plumb, Lookinland, Olsen	Nominated
2006	Best Dream Sequence	Episode: "Love and the Older Man", in which Marcia has a crush on her dentist.	Nominated
2006	Favorite Made-for-TV Maid	Ann B. Davis	Won
2006	Favorite TV Food	Pork chops and applesauce.	Won
2007	Most Beautiful Braces	Maureen McCormick	Nominated
2007	Pop Culture Award	Williams, McCormick, Knight, Plumb, Lookinland, Olsen, Davis, Henderson, Lloyd J. Schwartz (producer)	Won

== Discography ==
During the series' original run, the six Brady kids recorded several albums on Paramount's record label, all credited to "The Brady Bunch". Note that Florence Henderson and Robert Reed did not participate in these recordings, and are not pictured on the album sleeves.

While session musicians provided backing, the actors from the series provided their own singing voices (which was not always the case for early 1970s television crossover acts). In addition, Chris Knight & Maureen McCormick issued a duet LP in 1973, and five of the six Brady kids also released solo singles between 1970 and 1974; only Susan Olsen did not. None of the singles from The Brady Bunch, or any single or album from the assorted spin-off acts, ever became hits on any national music charts. The group's 1972 album Meet The Brady Bunch was their only charting release, hitting No. 108 on Billboard's album charts.

=== Studio albums ===
List of studio albums, with selected chart positions
Title	Details	Peak chart positions		
Title	Details	US	US Cashbox	US RW
Merry Christmas from the Brady Bunch	Released: November 2, 1970; Label: Paramount; Format: LP, 8-track, cassette	—	—	—
Meet the Brady Bunch	Released: April 17, 1972; Label: Paramount; Format: LP, 8-track, cassette	108	66	107
The Kids from the Brady Bunch	Released: December 4, 1972; Label: Paramount; Format: LP, 8-track	—	—	—
The Brady Bunch Phonographic Album	Released: June 18, 1973; Label: Paramount; Format: LP, 8-track	—	—	—
Chris Knight & Maureen McCormick (Chris Knight and Maureen McCormick duet album)	Released: September 14, 1973; Label: Paramount; Format: LP	—	—	—
"—" denotes a recording that did not chart or was not released in that territory.

=== Compilation albums ===
List of albums, showing relevant details
Title	Album details
It's a Sunshine Day: The Best of the Brady Bunch	Released: March 2, 1993; Label: MCA (MCA 10764); Format: CD

=== Singles ===
Also includes solo singles as indicated.

Title	Year	Album
"Frosty the Snowman"	1970	Merry Christmas from the Brady Bunch
"How Will It Be?" (Eve Plumb)	1970	Non-album single
"Sweet Sweetheart" (Barry Williams)	1971	Non-album single
"Time to Change"	1972	Meet the Brady Bunch
"We'll Always Be Friends"	1972	Meet the Brady Bunch
"Over and Over" (Chris Knight)	1972	Non-album single
"Candy (Sugar Shoppe)"	1972	The Kids from the Brady Bunch
"Zuckerman's Famous Pig"	1973	The Brady Bunch Phonographic Album
"Truckin' Back to You" (Maureen McCormick)	1973	Non-album single
"Everything I Do"	1973	The Brady Bunch Phonographic Album
"Little Bird (Sing Your Song)" (Maureen McCormick)	1973	Chris Knight & Maureen McCormick
"Love's in the Roses" (Maureen McCormick)	1974	Non-album single
"Love Doesn't Care Who's in It" (Mike Lookinland)	1974	Non-album single

== Spin-offs, sequels, and reunions ==
Several spin-offs, and sequels, and reality series to the original series have been made, featuring all or most of the original cast. These include another sitcom, an animated series, a variety show, television films, a dramatic series, a stage play, theatrical films, and a reality series.

=== Kelly's Kids/Together We Stand/Nothing Is Easy ===
A final-season Brady Bunch episode, "Kelly's Kids", was intended as a pilot for a prospective spin-off series of the same name. Ken Berry starred as Ken Kelly, a friend and neighbor of the Bradys, who with his wife Kathy (Brooke Bundy) adopted three orphaned boys of different racial backgrounds. One of the adopted sons was played by Todd Lookinland, the younger brother of Mike Lookinland. While Kelly's Kids was not subsequently picked up as a full series, producer Sherwood Schwartz reworked the basic premise for the short-lived 1980s sitcom Together We Stand starring Elliott Gould and Dee Wallace.

=== The Brady Kids ===
A 22-episode animated Saturday morning cartoon series, produced by Filmation and airing on ABC from September 1972 to August 1974, is about the Brady kids having various adventures. The family's adults were never seen or mentioned, and the "home" scenes were in a very large, well-appointed tree house. Several animals were regular characters, including two non-English-speaking pandas (Ping and Pong), a talking bird (Merlin) which could do magic, and an ordinary pet dog (Mop Top). The first 17 episodes featured the voices of all six of the original child actors from the show, but Barry Williams and Maureen McCormick were replaced for the last five episodes due to a contract dispute.

=== The Brady Bunch Variety Hour ===
On November 28, 1976, a one-hour television special entitled The Brady Bunch Variety Hour aired on ABC. Eve Plumb was the only regular cast member from the original show who declined to be in the series and the role of Jan was recast with Geri Reischl. Produced by Sid and Marty Krofft, the sibling team behind H.R. Pufnstuf, Donny and Marie, and other variety shows and children's series of the era, the show was intended to air every fifth week in the same slot as The Hardy Boys/Nancy Drew Mysteries, but ended up being scheduled sporadically throughout the season, leading to inconsistent ratings and its inevitable cancellation.

In 2009, Brady Bunch cast member Susan Olsen, with Lisa Sutton, published a book, Love to Love You Bradys, which dissects and celebrates the Variety Hour as a cult classic.

=== The Brady Girls Get Married/The Brady Brides ===
The Brady Bunch
- Also known as: The Brady Brides
- Genre: Sitcom
- Created by: Sherwood Schwartz; Lloyd J. Schwartz
- Directed by: Peter Baldwin
- Starring: Maureen McCormick; Eve Plumb; Jerry Houser; Ron Kuhlman; Florence Henderson; Ann B. Davis; Keland Love
- Theme music composer: Frank De Vol
- Country of origin: United States
- Original language: English
- No. of seasons: 1
- No. of episodes: 10

Production
- Executive producers: Sherwood Schwartz; Lloyd J. Schwartz
- Producer: John Thomas Lenox
- Production locations: Paramount Studios, Hollywood, Los Angeles, California
- Cinematography: Lester Shorr
- Running time: 25 minutes
- Production companies: Redwood Productions; Paramount Television

Original release
- Network: NBC
- Release: February 6 – April 17, 1981

Related
- The Brady Bunch Hour; A Very Brady Christmas; The Brady Bunch

A TV reunion film called The Brady Girls Get Married was produced in 1981. Although scheduled to be shown in its original full-length film format, NBC decided at the last minute to divide it into half-hour segments and show one part a week for three weeks. The fourth week debuted a spin-off sitcom titled The Brady Brides, which carried on from where the reunion film left off. The film featured the entire original cast; this proved to be the only time the entire cast worked together on a single project following the cancellation of the original series (the complete surviving cast also appeared in these official projects together: Brady Bunch Home Movies from 1995, The Brady Bunch 35th Anniversary Reunion Special: Still Brady After All These Years from 2004, as well as various reunion programs in 2019 for the 50th anniversary). The film's opening credits featured the season-one "Grid" and theme song, with the addition of The Brady Girls Get Married title. The film shows what the characters had been doing since the original series ended: Mike is still an architect, Carol is a real-estate agent, Greg is a doctor, Marcia is a fashion designer, Peter is in the Air Force, Jan is also an architect, Bobby and Cindy are in college, and Alice has married Sam. Eventually, they all reunite for Marcia and Jan's double wedding.

The Brady Brides features Maureen McCormick and Eve Plumb reprising their respective roles as Marcia and Jan Brady. The series begins with Marcia and Jan and their new husbands buying a house and living together. The clashes between Jan's uptight and conservative husband, Phillip Covington III (a college professor in science who is several years older than Jan, played by Ron Kuhlman) and Marcia's tousled and more bohemian husband, Wally Logan (a fun-loving salesman for a large toy company, played by Jerry Houser), were the pivot on which many of the stories were based, not unlike The Odd Couple. Florence Henderson and Ann B. Davis also appeared regularly. Ten episodes were aired before the sitcom was cancelled. This was the only Brady show in sitcom form to be filmed in front of a live studio audience. Bob Eubanks guest-starred as himself in an episode where the two couples appear on The Newlywed Game.

Throughout the late 1980s and 1990s, The Brady Girls Get Married was rerun on various networks in its original full-length film format.

In 2019, the series was released on DVD for the first time as a part of The Brady-est Brady Bunch TV & Movie Collection.

==== Episodes (1981) ====
No.	Title	Original release date
1	"The Brady Girls Get Married (Part 1)"	February 6, 1981
Marcia and Jan announce that they are both getting married and plans soon begin for a double wedding.
2	"The Brady Girls Get Married (Part 2)"	February 13, 1981
Jan and Phillip want a traditional wedding, and Marcia and Wally want a modern wedding.
3	"The Brady Girls Get Married (Part 3)"	February 20, 1981
The weather spells disaster for an outdoor wedding, so they end up having the ceremony inside the Brady house. Note: This was the final time that the original cast of The Brady Bunch was all together.
4	"Living Together"	March 6, 1981
After all the houses they see are too expensive, Marcia, Jan and their husbands decide to share a house.
5	"Gorilla of My Dreams"	March 13, 1981
Marcia and Jan get some self-defense lessons from their mother, while a thief attempts to burglarize their home.
6	"The Newlywed Game"	March 20, 1981
Game-show host Bob Eubanks asks Marcia and Jan to appear on The Newlywed Game with their new husbands.
7	"The Mom Who Came to Dinner"	March 27, 1981
Carol temporarily moves in with her newly wedded daughters and their husbands while Mike is out of town.
8	"The Siege"	April 3, 1981
Wally's guilt over parking tickets causes him to panic when a policeman visits the house, so he decides to impersonate Phillip.
9	"Cool Hand Phil"	April 10, 1981
Phillip tries to change his image by dressing and acting "hip".
10	"A Pretty Boy is Like a Melody"	April 17, 1981
Marcia is forced to use Wally and Phillip in her fashion show after her models go on strike.

=== A Very Brady Christmas ===
A second TV reunion film, A Very Brady Christmas, aired in December 1988 on CBS and features most of the regular cast (except Susan Olsen, who was on her honeymoon at the time of filming; the role of Cindy was played by Jennifer Runyon), as well as three grandchildren, Peter's girlfriend, Valerie, and the spouses of Greg, Marcia, and Jan (Nora, Wally, and Phillip, respectively). The Nielsen ratings for A Very Brady Christmas were the highest of any television film that season for CBS.

=== The Bradys ===
Due to the success of A Very Brady Christmas, CBS asked Brady Bunch creator Sherwood Schwartz and son Lloyd to create a new series for the network. According to Lloyd Schwartz, he and his father initially balked at the idea because they felt a new series would harm the Brady franchise. They finally relented because CBS was "desperate for programming". A new series featuring the Brady clan was created entitled The Bradys. All original Brady Bunch cast members returned for the series, except for Maureen McCormick (Marcia), who was replaced with Leah Ayres.

As with A Very Brady Christmas, The Bradys also balanced elements of comedy and drama and featured storylines of a more serious nature than the original series and subsequent spin-offs. Lloyd Schwartz later said he compared The Bradys to another dramedy of the time, thirtysomething. The two-hour series premiere episode aired on February 9, 1990, at 9 pm on CBS and initially drew respectable ratings. Subsequent episodes were moved to 8 pm, where ratings quickly declined. Due to the decline, CBS cancelled the series after six episodes.

=== Day by Day: "A Very Brady Episode" ===
The Day by Day episode titled "A Very Brady Episode" (February 5, 1989), on NBC, reunited six of the original Brady Bunch cast members: Robert Reed, Florence Henderson, Ann B. Davis, Christopher Knight, Mike Lookinland and Maureen McCormick.

=== Bradymania: A Very Brady Special ===
A one-hour TV special retrospective of The Brady Bunch hosted by Florence Henderson who introduces a montage of various episodes of the original series, and also examines the show's phenomenal after-life, illustrated by clips from spin-offs and other incarnations of the series. Also, cast members Christopher Knight, Susan Olsen, Mike Lookinland, Barry Williams, Ann B. Davis, and creator Sherwood Schwartz reflect on the impact of the show on their lives. Directed by Malcolm Leo, the special was originally broadcast on ABC on May 19, 1993.

=== A Very Brady Renovation ===
Christopher Knight, Mike Lookinland, Maureen McCormick, Susan Olsen, Eve Plumb, and Barry Williams reunited for the 2019 HGTV series A Very Brady Renovation, which follows a full renovation (interior mostly) of the real house, used for the sitcom's exterior shots, into the fictional Brady house.

=== Chopped ===
In conjunction with the Renovation series, in the autumn of 2019, The Food Network aired two episodes of their program Chopped with the siblings as guest judges. Season 43, episode 3 - "Brady Bunch Bash" features Williams, Plumb, and Lookinland judging meals made from Hawaiian ingredients. Season 43, episode 4 - "A Very Brady Chopped" features McCormick, Knight, and Olsen judging meals from "groovy" ingredients of the '70s.

=== A Very Brady Musical ===
In October 2020, during the global COVID-19 virus pandemic, Ogunquit Playhouse did a live stream broadcast of A Very Brady Musical, a brand-new musical adventure for the stage created by Lloyd J. Schwartz (son of Brady Bunch creator Sherwood Schwartz), Hope Juber (book/lyrics), and Laurence Juber (music/lyrics) and directed by Richard Israel. It was co-produced by Ogunquit Playhouse, Purple Mountain Productions, and Broadway and Beyond Theatricals. More in the vein of the Brady films, this PG-13 story follows the Brady kids' misadventures when they come to the mistaken conclusion that Mike and Carol are headed for divorce. After consulting Alice, the kids raise money to pay for marriage counseling, learning valuable lessons along the way, as their respective well-intentioned ideas land them in outrageous trouble. Barry Williams and Christopher Knight were on hand for a post-show question and answer session on all things Brady.

=== Dragging the Classics: The Brady Bunch ===
On June 30, 2021, streaming service Paramount+ celebrated Pride Month with the premiere of a crossover special combining The Brady Bunch and the reality television series RuPaul's Drag Race. In the crossover event, original Brady cast members and former Drag Race competitors come together to recreate a Brady Bunch episode. Christopher Knight and Mike Lookinland reprise their roles of Peter and Bobby Brady, respectively, while the original Greg Brady, Barry Williams, switches parts to play family patriarch Mike; Greg Brady is portrayed by Drag Race Season 6 and All Stars 3 competitor BenDeLaCreme. Season 6 winner Bianca Del Rio fills the role of mother Carol Brady, and daughters Marcia, Jan, and Cindy are portrayed by All Stars 5 winner Shea Couleé, season 2 and All Stars 6 competitor Kylie Sonique Love, and season 13 runner-up Kandy Muse, respectively. Season 11 Miss Congeniality Nina West appears as housekeeper Alice Nelson.

The special, which recreates the season two episode "Will the Real Jan Brady Please Stand Up?", also contains cameos by Drag Race judges RuPaul and Michelle Visage, who appear as employees of a wig shop that Jan patronizes. The original Jan and Cindy Brady, Eve Plumb and Susan Olsen, also appear as children who are guests at the birthday party.

=== The Real Brady Bros: Podcast ===
In January 2022, Christopher Knight and Barry Williams published their new podcast The Real Brady Bros. The weekly podcast recaps episodes of The Brady Bunch. Eve Plumb, Susan Olsen and Mike Lookinland have guested to discuss episodes in which they have featured.

=== Unmade revivals ===
In October 2024, during a heated Presidential election cycle, Susan Olsen claimed on a political podcast that due to her right-wing political views, in 2022, a planned Brady Bunch revival, which would have picked up with the Brady Bunch children as adults, was cancelled. Olsen alleged that Lloyd J. Schwartz questioned her about her political views, and due to her behavior, the project died in early stages and it was unclear whether even a script had been written. Reportedly, in the series, Cindy was going to be a libertarian podcaster. According to Olsen, the project was "dead in the water".

Pop culture historian Kimberly Potts wrote in her 2019 book "The Way We All Became The Brady Bunch" that in the 2010s, CBS had plans of a revival featuring a widowed Carol in her 80s, who would have ended up marrying one of Greg's friends. Florence Henderson was reportedly warm to the idea, but it never came to fruition with her death in 2016.

== Film adaptations ==
Twenty years following the conclusion of the original series, a film adaptation, The Brady Bunch Movie, went into production and was released in 1995 from Paramount Pictures. The film is set in the present day (1990s) and the Bradys, still living their lives as if it were the 1970s, are unfamiliar with their surroundings. It stars Gary Cole and Shelley Long as Mike and Carol Brady, with Christopher Daniel Barnes (Greg), Christine Taylor (Marcia), Paul Sutera (Peter), Jennifer Elise Cox (Jan), Jesse Lee (Bobby), Olivia Hack (Cindy), Henriette Mantel (Alice), and cameo appearances from Ann B. Davis as a long-haul truck driver, Barry Williams as a record label executive, Christopher Knight as a Westdale High gym teacher, RuPaul as a guidance counselor, and Florence Henderson as Carol's mother. Mike Lookinland, Susan Olsen and Maureen McCormick appear in deleted scenes.

A sequel, A Very Brady Sequel, was released in 1996. The cast of the first film returned for the sequel. Another sequel, The Brady Bunch in the White House, was made-for-television and aired on Fox in 2002. Gary Cole and Shelley Long returned for the third film, while the Brady kids and Alice were recast.

In the video game, Fallout: New Vegas, there's an achievement (video games) in the add-on "Dead Money" called "Assemble Your Crew" which parodies the opening title but features numerous Fallout characters, including Vault Boy.

The third episode of the Disney+ miniseries WandaVision, "Now in Color", pays homage to 1970s sitcoms, including The Brady Bunch, and uses a similar intro for the virtual WandaVision in-show program.

== Unauthorized adaptations ==
An unauthorized stage show, The Real Live Brady Bunch, was created by siblings Joey Soloway and Faith Soloway at Chicago's Annoyance Theatre in 1991. The cast, including Andy Richter as Mike, Jane Lynch as Carol, and Melanie Hutsell as Jan, performed original Brady Bunch scripts verbatim on stage. The show became a phenomenon in Chicago, with "new" episodes transcribed and performed every two weeks. Guest performers included Eve Plumb and Davy Jones, while Robert Reed and Susan Olsen attended multiple performances. Paramount was preparing legal action over the stage show when Sherwood Schwartz visited Chicago. Charmed by the tribute, Schwartz agreed to grant rights to the Soloways. The show went on to run in New York and Los Angeles. Joey Soloway became a successful television producer, with credits including Transparent.

David Gilbert's 2014 short story, "Here's the Story," imagines a backstory for the series, in which the original spouses of Carol and Mike are on the verge of beginning an extramarital affair when they both die in the same plane crash. The story ran in The New Yorker in 2014.

== See also ==
- Christmas with The Brady Bunch, an album released by Paramount Records in 1970
- It's a Sunshine Day: The Best of The Brady Bunch—1993 compilation album
- Tam Spiva, a Brady Bunch script writer
