= Eve Plumb =

American actress, singer and painter (b. 1958)

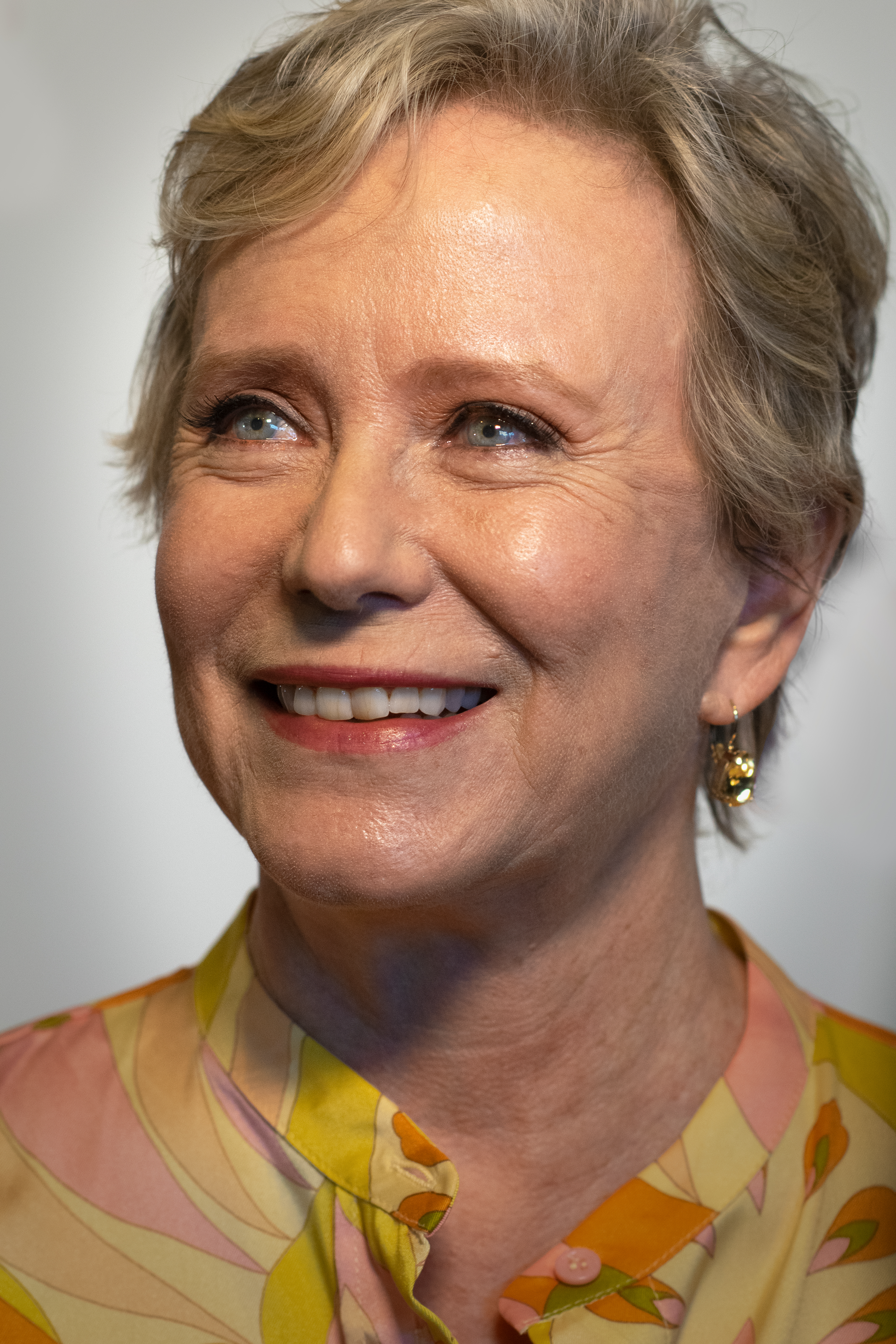
- Plumb in 2022
- Born: Eve Aline Plumb; April 29, 1958 (age 68); Burbank, California, U.S.
- Occupations: Actress; singer; painter
- Years active: 1966–present
- Known for: The Brady Bunch; The Brady Kids; The Brady Brides; A Very Brady Christmas; Dawn: Portrait of a Teenage Runaway; Little Women
- Spouses: Rick Mansfield (m. 1979; div. 1981) Ken Pace (m. 1995)

Eve Aline Plumb (born April 29, 1958) is an American actress, singer and painter. She is best known for portraying the middle daughter Jan Brady on the ABC sitcom The Brady Bunch.

A native of Southern California, Plumb began appearing in commercials at age seven, and also had guest roles on the televisions series Family Affair, The Big Valley and The Virginian between 1966 and 1967. She was cast as Jan Brady on The Brady Bunch in 1969, and portrayed the role until the series' end in 1974. After, Plumb continued to work in television, portraying a teenage prostitute in the NBC television film Dawn: Portrait of a Teenage Runaway (1976), and as Elizabeth March in the 1978 miniseries Little Women.

Plumb continued to reprise her role as Jan Brady in numerous reunion series and films, including The Brady Brides (1981) and A Very Brady Christmas (1988). She made her feature film debut with a minor role in I'm Gonna Git You Sucka (1988), and later appeared in Gregg Araki's black comedy Nowhere (1997). In 2010, Plumb made her New York stage debut in Miss Abigail's Guide to Dating, Mating and Marriage, followed by stage productions of Nora Ephron's Love, Loss, and What I Wore, and Same Time, Next Year. She subsequently had a supporting role in the critically acclaimed thriller Blue Ruin (2013).

== Early life ==
Plumb was born in Burbank, California, to Flora June (née Dobry) and record producer Neely Plumb. She has two siblings: a sister named Flora and a brother named Ben.

== Career ==
=== 1966–1974: Early work and The Brady Bunch ===
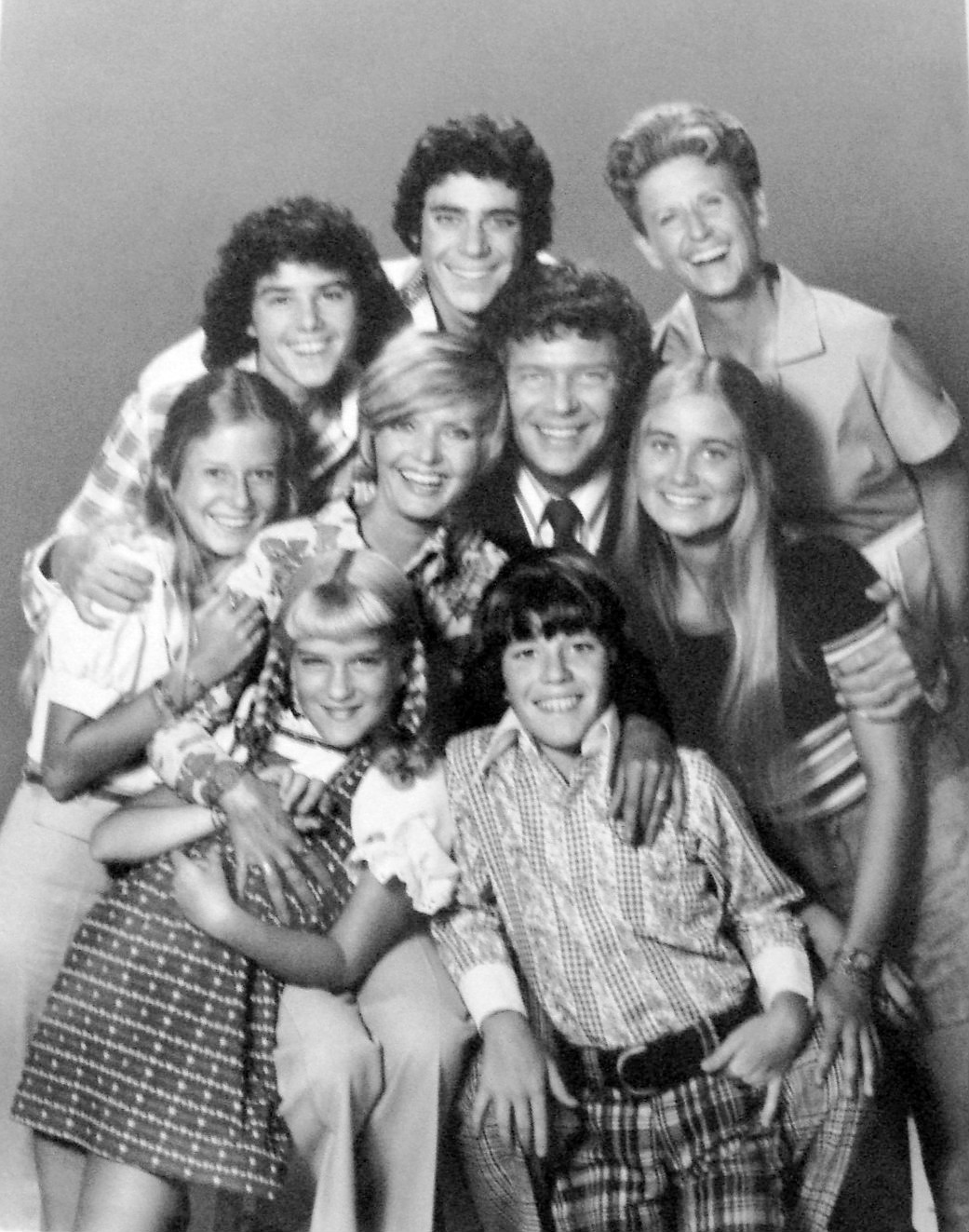
Cast photo of The Brady Bunch. Back (L-R): Christopher Knight (Peter), Barry Williams (Greg), Ann B. Davis (Alice). Second row (L-R): Eve Plumb (Jan), Florence Henderson (Carol), Robert Reed (Mike), Maureen McCormick (Marcia). Front (L-R): Susan Olsen (Cindy), Mike Lookinland (Bobby).

Plumb began her acting career in TV commercials in 1966. The following year, she appeared on The Virginian, The Big Valley and Lassie. (She was also cast as "Bonnie Braids" in a TV pilot version of the comic strip Dick Tracy, but does not actually appear in the program itself, only in the opening credits.) In 1968, she appeared on It Takes a Thief and Family Affair; in the latter, she played a terminally ill girl on the episode "Christmas Came A Little Early". In 1969, she appeared on an episode of Gunsmoke.

From 1969 to 1974, Plumb appeared as middle sister Jan Brady in the ABC sitcom The Brady Bunch. She was cast partly because she bore a resemblance to Joyce Bulifant, who was originally considered to play the Brady mother before the role eventually went to Florence Henderson. Her featured storylines included Jan's embarrassment over not having a boyfriend, concerns about her future appearance, being a middle child, and her insecurity over wearing glasses. Several episodes centered on Jan's jealousy of older sister Marcia, resulting in the famous whiny-complaint catchphrase "Marcia, Marcia, Marcia!", that has arguably become the quintessential quote of the series. (However, Plumb actually said the phrase in only one episode: "Her Sister's Shadow".) Plumb also supplied the voice of Jan in the ABC Saturday morning cartoon The Brady Kids from 1972 to 1974. After The Brady Bunch was canceled in 1974, it went on to even greater success in syndicated reruns. The sitcom has never left the television airwaves and eventually spawned numerous spin-offs, reunion specials, feature films, and parodies.

Several episodes of the sitcom featured the Brady kids singing and as a result, Plumb and the rest of the younger cast recorded several albums. Plumb would also provide a monologue for the Pat Williams Orchestra's 1974 recording of "California Love Story". The single was co-produced by Plumb's recording executive father, Neely Plumb.

=== 1975–2000: Other projects and Brady Bunch reunions ===
After The Brady Bunch ended, Plumb's first notable role was that of a teenage prostitute in the NBC television movie Dawn: Portrait of a Teenage Runaway (1976). She also appeared in the sequel Alexander: The Other Side of Dawn (1977). Plumb starred as "Beth" in NBC productions of Little Women, a 1978 miniseries and a 1979 short-lived television series. Plumb also made numerous guest-starring appearances in such series as Here's Lucy; The Love Boat; Fantasy Island; Wonder Woman; One Day at a Time; The Facts of Life; Murder, She Wrote; The Super Mario Bros. Super Show!; Lois & Clark: The New Adventures of Superman; and All My Children. She appeared in the episode "The Force of Evil" from the 1977 series Quinn Martin's Tales of the Unexpected (known in the United Kingdom as Twist in the Tale).

Plumb was the only original cast member who declined to reunite for the 1976–77 variety show The Brady Bunch Hour on ABC. Much was made of her absence, including accusations that she no longer wanted to be associated with the Bradys. Plumb has stated in interviews that she was willing to do the variety show's original special episode, but could not commit to a five-year option for additional shows. Her role would be filled by Geri Reischl, who went on to be known among Brady Bunch fans as "fake Jan".

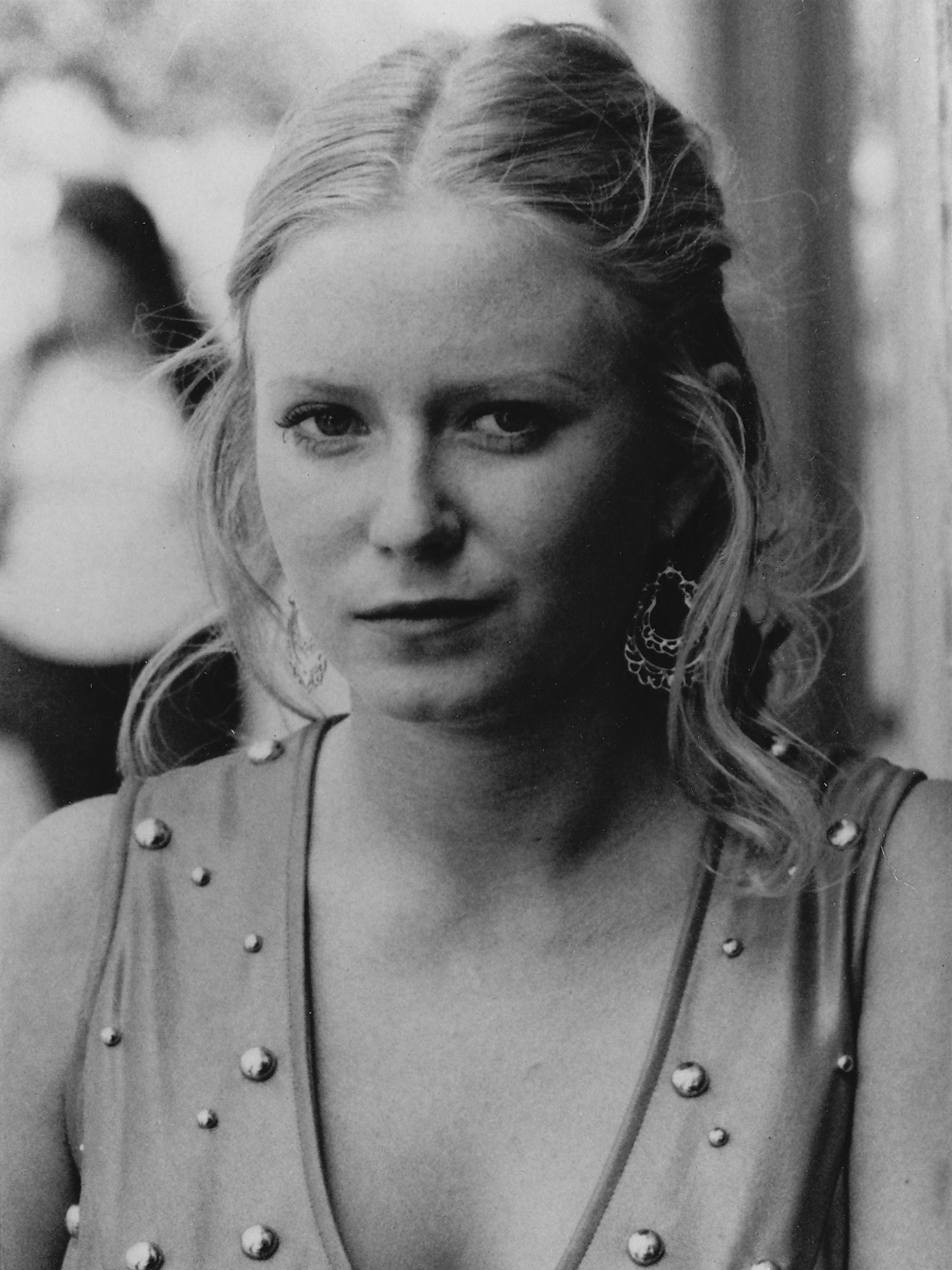
Plumb as the title character in Dawn: Portrait of a Teenage Runaway, 1976

Plumb returned to the "Jan" role for the NBC TV movie The Brady Girls Get Married (1981), which led to The Brady Brides, a short-lived sitcom in which she co-starred with Maureen McCormick, who played Marcia Brady. She also appeared in the CBS television movie A Very Brady Christmas (1988) and its 1990 spin-off dramedy series, The Bradys. To promote their latest incarnation, the cast appeared on an episode of Sally Jessy Raphael, which is remembered for having been shot outdoors in Florida during a rainstorm.

In 1993, Plumb had a brief role as Mrs. Noah in the B-Movie mockumentary ...And God Spoke. Two years later she was interviewed as part of a 1995 retrospective special titled Brady Bunch Home Movies, produced by Susan Olsen, who played Cindy Brady. That same year, Plumb appeared on a special "child stars" installment of The Jenny Jones Show. In 1995, Plumb was a member of the cast of the Saturday morning sitcom Fudge, playing the title character's mother, Mrs. Anne Hatcher. The show aired on ABC. To promote the series, Plumb appeared on The Jon Stewart Show. Plumb also appeared in the movie Fudge-a-Mania (1995), the TV pilot movie for the Fudge series the week before the series premiered. In 1996, she reminisced about her Brady years on The Rosie O'Donnell Show and on the E True Hollywood Story: The Brady Bunch. In 1998, Plumb was the original Pam Burkhart on That '70s Show (only seen in episode 6, "The Keg").

=== 2001–present: Television, film, and stage ===
In 2001, Plumb appeared on a special Brady-themed edition of the NBC game show The Weakest Link. In 2004, she was part of the TV Land production The Brady Bunch 35th Anniversary Reunion Special: Still Brady After All These Years. Plumb appeared on the December 18, 2006, premiere episode of the NBC game show Identity.

In 2007, Plumb was the only surviving cast member who was not on hand when TV Land honored The Brady Bunch with its Pop Culture Award. In 2008, she appeared on a special Brady-themed week of the syndicated game show Trivial Pursuit: America Plays, hosted by Christopher Knight, who played Peter Brady. Also in 2008, Plumb was a guest on The Florence Henderson Show on RLTV, hosted by her former TV mother.

Plumb appeared in several made-for-television movies, including The House on Greenapple Road (1970), The Force of Evil (1977), Telethon (1977), Secrets of Three Hungry Wives (1978), The Night the Bridge Fell Down (1983) and Yesterday Today (1992). Her film credits include I'm Gonna Git You Sucka (1988), ... And God Spoke (1993), Nowhere (1997), Breast Men (1997) and Manfast (2003). On August 29, 2008, Plumb appeared on the NBC daytime soap opera Days of Our Lives.

In 2010, Plumb originated the title character in the New York production of Miss Abigail's Guide to Dating, Mating and Marriage, inspired by a book and website of the same name. The role was her first New York stage role. She was next seen on the New York stage when she starred in Nora Ephron and Delia Ephron's award-winning Love, Loss, and What I Wore, and she co-starred in Same Time, Next Year with Broadway's John Bolton at the Surflight Theater in Beach Haven, New Jersey. In July–October 2013, Plumb portrayed Aunt June in the off-Broadway play Unbroken Circle by James Wesley.

In 2013, she had a guest-starring role on Law & Order: Special Victims Unit as Angela Brooks in the episode "Monster's Legacy" and a guest-starring role on Army Wives as Reba Green in the episode "Damaged". Also in 2013, she had a small part in the film Blue Ruin. In January 2016, Plumb reprised the role of shop teacher Mrs. Murdoch (originally played by Alice Ghostley in the 1978 movie Grease) in Fox's production of Grease Live. In July 2016, Plumb attended the Democratic National Convention as a member of Broadway at the DNC and was part of an ensemble of Broadway stars who sang a rendition of "What the World Needs Now Is Love". In 2019, Plumb reunited with her television siblings from The Brady Bunch for the HGTV series, A Very Brady Renovation.

== Personal life ==
Plumb has been painting for more than two decades and has enjoyed success at select galleries across the United States.

Plumb was the first of the Brady siblings to marry, and the first divorced. She first tied the knot with Rick Mansfield in 1979. The marriage ended in divorce less than two years later. Plumb has been married to Ken Pace, a business and technology consultant, since 1995.

As of 2010, she resided in Laguna Beach, California, and served on the city's Design Review Board. Around 2010, Plumb purchased a residence in Manhattan, and had made New York City her primary residence as of 2019, though she divides her time between there and Los Angeles.

In 2016, she sold the Malibu home that she had purchased at the age of 11 in 1969. She bought the 1950s beach bungalow for $55,000 and sold it for $3.9 million.

== Filmography ==
=== Film ===
Year	Title	Role	Notes
1970	House on Greenapple Road	Margaret Ord	
1988	I'm Gonna Git You Sucka	Kalinga's Wife	
1993	The Making of '... And God Spoke'	Mrs. Noah	
1997	Nowhere	Mrs. Sighvatssohn	
2003	Manfast	Professor Mason	
2013	Blue Ruin	Kris Cleland	
2015	The Sisters Plotz	Celestia Plotz	
2017	Bagdad, Florida	Grease	Short film
2018	Monsoon	Gale	

=== Television ===
Year	Title	Role	Notes
1966–1967	The Big Valley	Sara Jane / Ellen / Laure	Episodes: "Hide the Children", "Brother Love", "Explosion! Part 2"
1967	The Virginian	Kathy Cooper	Episode: "A Small Taste of Justice"
1967	Lassie	Terry	Episode: "Miracle of the Dove"
1968	It Takes a Thief	Maritsa	Episode: "The Radomir Miniature"
1968	Mannix	Marian Harriman	Episode: "Edge of the Knife"
1968	Family Affair	Eve Bowers	Episode: "Christmas Came a Little Early"
1968	Lancer	Pony Alice	Episode: "The Heart of Pony Alice"
1969	Gunsmoke	Sue	Episode: "Gold Town"
1969–1974	The Brady Bunch	Jan Brady	Main role
1970	House on Greenapple Road	Margaret Ord	Television film
1972	The ABC Saturday Superstar Movie	Jan Brady	Voice role; episode: "The Brady Kids on Mysterious Island"
1972	Here's Lucy	Patricia Carter	Episode: "Lucy and Donny Osmond"
1972–1974	The Brady Kids	Jan Brady	Main voice role
1974	Sigmund and the Sea Monsters	Harriet	Episode: "Now You See 'Em, Now You Don't"
1974	ABC Afterschool Special	Gretchen	Episode: "Sara's Summer of the Swans"
1976	Dawn: Portrait of a Teenage Runaway	Dawn Wetherby	Television film
1977	Quinn Martin's Tales of the Unexpected	Cindy Carrington	Episode: "The Force of Evil"
1977	Alexander: The Other Side of Dawn	Dawn Wetherby	Television film
1977	Wonder Woman	Elena	Episode: "The Pied Piper"
1977	Telethon	Kim	Television film
1978	Insight	Jeannie	Episode: "Is Anyone Listening?"
1978	Little Women	Elizabeth 'Beth' March	Television miniseries
1978	Secrets of Three Hungry Wives	Vicki Wood	Television film
1978	Greatest Heroes of the Bible	Lilla	Episode: "The Story of Noah: Parts 1 & 2"
1978–1982	The Love Boat	Various roles	3 episodes
1979–1981	Fantasy Island	Various roles	3 episodes
1981	The Brady Brides	Jan Brady Covington	Main role
1982	One Day at a Time	Melissa Layton	Episode: "Lovers & Other Parents"
1983	The Facts of Life	Meg	Episodes: "Best Sister: Part 1", "Best Sister: Part 2"
1983	The Night the Bridge Fell Down	Terry Kelly	Television film
1985	Murder, She Wrote	Tug	Episode: "Jessica Behind Bars"
1988	A Very Brady Christmas	Jan Brady Covington	Television film
1989	The Super Mario Bros. Super Show!	Jodie	1 episode
1990	The Bradys	Jan Brady Covington	Main role
1994	Lois & Clark: The New Adventures of Superman	Rose Collins	Episode: "Illusions of Grandeur"
1995	Fudge	Anne Hatcher	Main role
1998	That '70s Show	Mrs. Burkhart	Episode: "The Keg"
2003	All My Children	June Landau	
2008	Days of Our Lives	Dora	1 episode
2012	The Sisters Plotz	Celestia Plotz	
2012	The Pox Show	Nurse Dremel	Television film
2013	Law & Order: Special Victims Unit	Angela Brooks	Episode: "Monster's Legacy"
2013	Army Wives	Reba Green	Episode: "Damaged"
2016	Grease: Live	Mrs. Murdock	Television film
2017	The Path	Wendy	1 episode
2017	Blue Bloods	Barbara Stevens	Episode: "Love Lost"
2019	Crashing	Marcie	Episode: "The Christian Tour"
2019	A Very Brady Renovation	Eve Plumb	7 episodes
2020	Bull	Joan Lawson	Episode: "Missing"
2021	Dragging the Classics: The Brady Bunch	Lucy	Paramount Plus TV special

== Book ==
- Plumb, Eve (with Marcia Wilke) (2026). Happiness Included: Jan Brady and Beyond. Citadel Press. ISBN 0-806-54503-8.
