= Jackie Mills =

American jazz musician

- Born: March 11, 1922; New York City, U.S.
- Died: March 22, 2010 (aged 88) Beaumont, California, U.S.
- Genre: Jazz
- Occupation: Drummer
- Instrument: Drums
- Years active: Early 1940s–early 1970s?

Jackie Mills (March 11, 1922, New York City – March 22, 2010, Beaumont, California) was an American jazz drummer.

== Biography ==
Mills first learned guitar before picking up drums when he was ten years old. He played in the swing groups of Charlie Barnet and Boyd Raeburn in the 1940s, then with Jazz at the Philharmonic, Gene Norman, Babe Russin, Mannie Klein, Dizzy Gillespie, Benny Goodman, Rene Touzet, Sonny Criss, Andre Previn, Lionel Hampton, Stan Getz, Woody Herman, and Red Norvo. Later in the 1940s he became interested in bebop and began playing in a style influenced by Max Roach. He began playing with Harry James in 1949, working with him through the late 1950s.

Mills also recorded as a session musician in the '50s, working with artists such as Gerry Wiggins and Anita O'Day. In his later career, Mills recorded occasionally, including with Freddie Roach in 1966 and Dodo Marmarosa in 1978, but was chiefly active as a record producer and co-founder of Choreo Records, doing production work for Columbia, MGM, Mainstream, Capitol and Liberty Records.

In 1969, Mills acquired Larrabee Sound Studios' original location (later referred to as Larrabee West) from its co-founders Gerry Goffin and Carole King. Mills owned and operated Larrabee through the mid-1980s, after which the studio was acquired by his son Kevin. During Mills's ownership, Larrabee continued to operate as a recording studio in Los Angeles.

== Discography ==
With Dodo Marmarosa

- ’’Mellow Mood / How High The Moon (Atomic Records EP, 1945)

With Howard McGhee

- ’’Just Jazz Concert (GNP Crescendo, 1947)

With Dodo Marmarosa

- ’’Piano Contrasts (Concert Hall, 1956)

With Benny Carter

- Cosmopolite (Norgran, 1956)

With Harry Betts

- The Jazz Soul of Doctor Kildare and other great television themes (Choreo, 1962)

With Harry Edison

- "Sweets" for the Sweet (Sue, 1964)

With Harry James

- The New James (Capitol, 1958)
- Harry's Choice! (Capitol, 1958)

With Jimmy McGriff

- I've Got a Woman (Sue, 1962)
