= Maureen McCormick =

American actress and singer (born 1956)

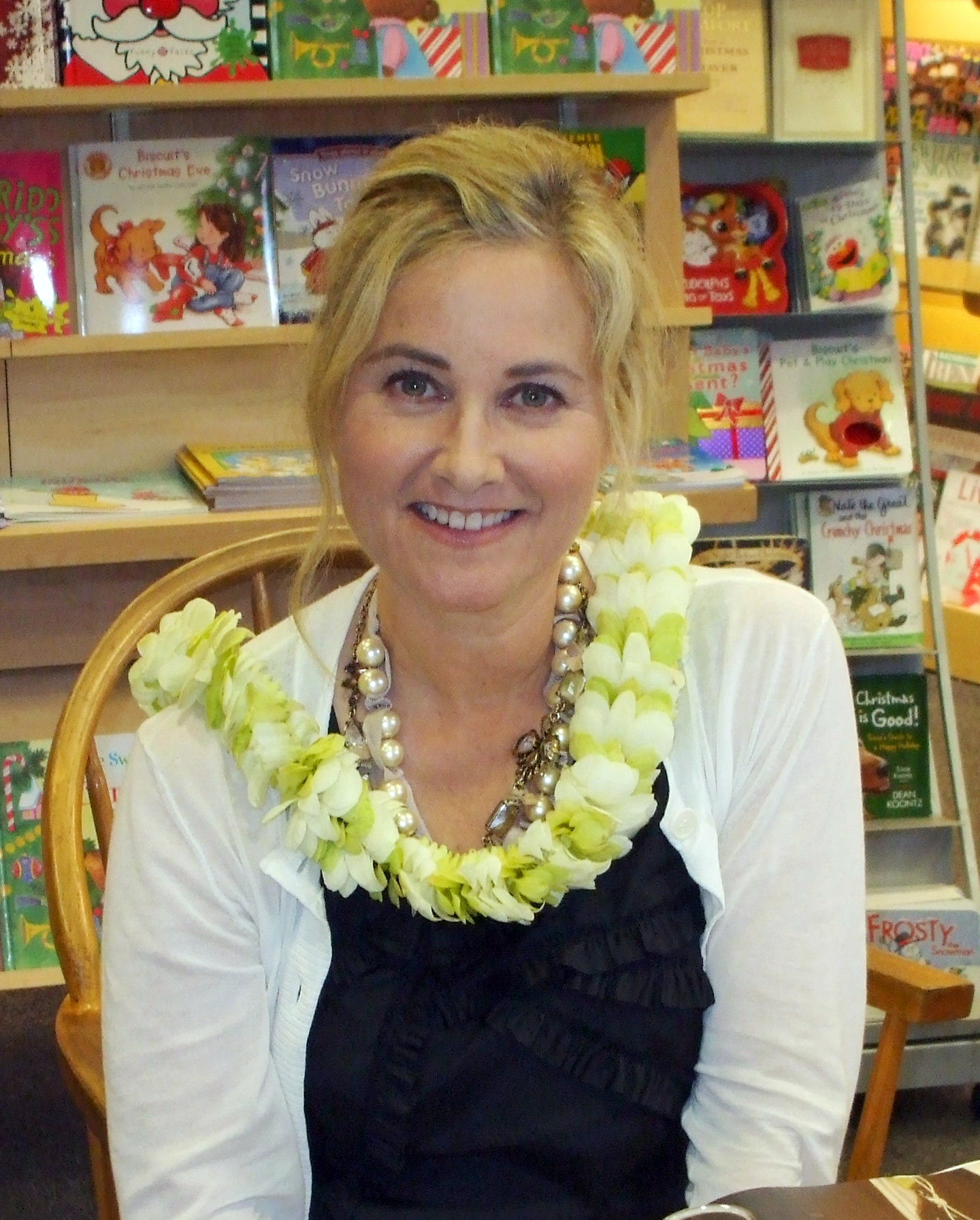
- McCormick in 2009
- Born: Maureen Denise McCormick; August 5, 1956 (age 70); Los Angeles, California, U.S.
- Occupations: Actress; singer; author
- Years active: 1964–present
- Known for: The Brady Bunch; The Brady Kids; The Brady Brides; A Very Brady Christmas; The Love Boat; Fantasy Island
- Spouse: Michael Cummings (m. 1985)
- Children: 1

Maureen Denise McCormick (born August 5, 1956) is an American actress, singer and author, best known for her role as Marcia Brady on the ABC television sitcom The Brady Bunch (1969–1974). She reprised the role in several of its various spin-offs and films, including The Brady Kids, The Brady Bunch Hour, The Brady Brides and A Very Brady Christmas (1988).

In the 1980s and 1990s, McCormick ventured into film and stage acting, with supporting roles in the films The Idolmaker (1980), Texas Lightning (1981), and Return to Horror High (1987). On stage, she starred as Wendy Darling in a 1983 production of Peter Pan and as Betty Rizzo in a 1994 production of Grease. In the 2000s, McCormick was the first actress to portray Rebecca Hotchkiss on the television soap opera Passions, as well as appearing on various reality television series such as VH1's Celebrity Fit Club, CMT's Gone Country (which led to a short-lived spin-off series led by McCormick, Outsiders Inn) and the Australian version of I'm a Celebrity... Get Me Out of Here!.

In music, McCormick recorded four studio albums with the Brady Bunch cast and toured with them. Her only release as a solo artist to date is a country music album, When You Get a Little Lonely (1995). McCormick's personal life was troubled following her initial period of success on The Brady Bunch, struggling with substance abuse, an eating disorder, and depression, which impeded her career. In 2008, McCormick published an autobiography, Here's the Story, which debuted at number four on The New York Times bestseller list.

== Life and career ==
=== 1956–1968: Early life and television roles ===
McCormick was born on August 5, 1956, in the Encino section of Los Angeles, California, to Irene (née Beckman) and Richard McCormick, a teacher. She has three older brothers: Michael, Dennis and Kevin. She is of Irish and German descent, and was raised in a Catholic family.

At age six, she won the Baby Miss San Fernando Valley beauty pageant. In 1964, she first appeared on national U.S. television, in Mattel commercials for Barbie and Chatty Cathy dolls. Through the later 1960s, McCormick appeared in two episodes of Bewitched—in a season-one dream of Darrin's as one of his witch children named Little Endora, and then in a season-two Halloween episode as Endora herself transformed into a little girl. She also played guest roles on I Dream of Jeannie, Honey West, The Farmer's Daughter, and My Three Sons. In 1970, she lent her voice to a redesigned Chatty Cathy doll. McCormick attended Taft High School in Woodland Hills.

=== 1969–1974: The Brady Bunch ===
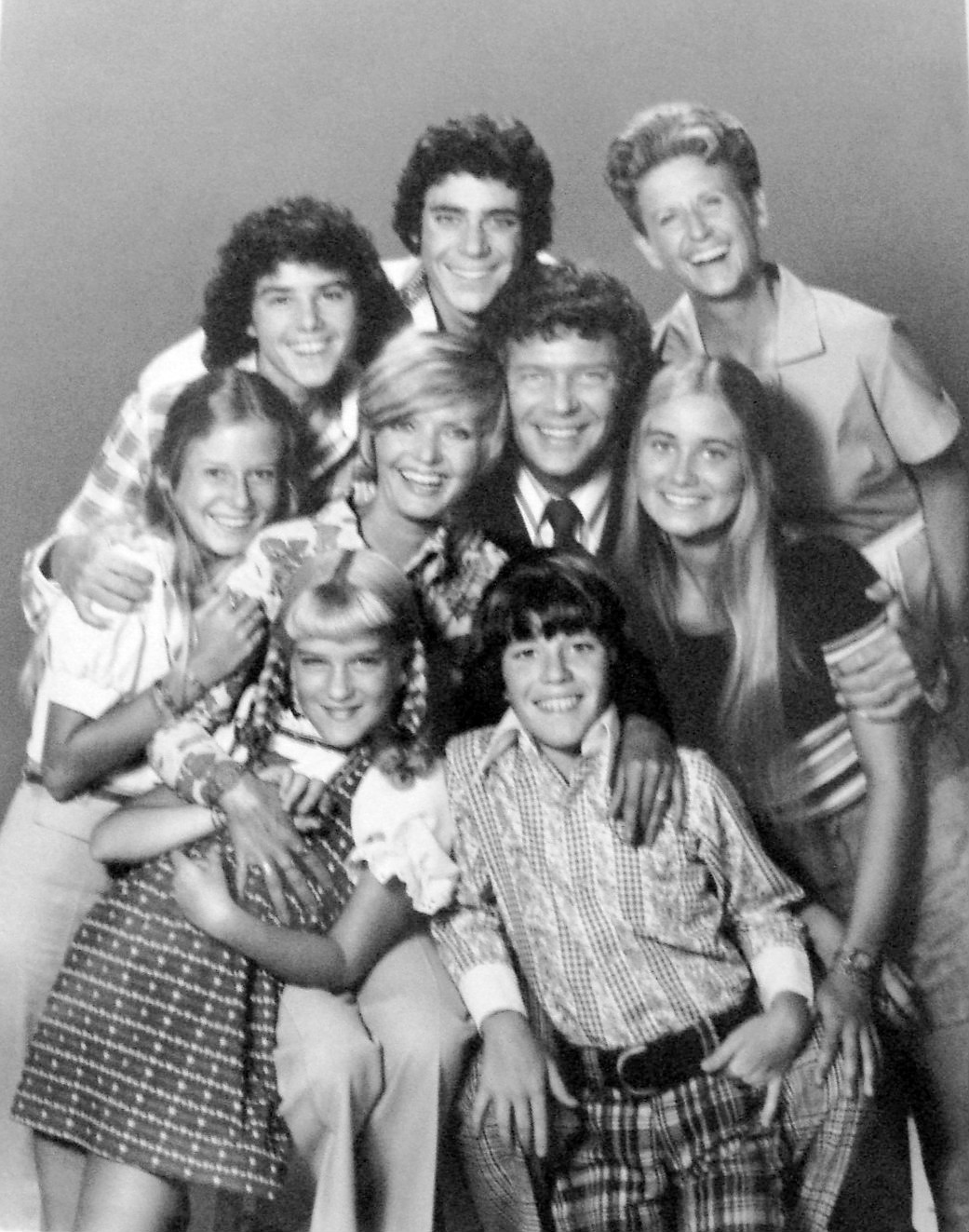
Cast photo of The Brady Bunch. Back (L-R): Christopher Knight (Peter), Barry Williams (Greg), Ann B. Davis (Alice). Second row (L-R): Eve Plumb (Jan), Florence Henderson (Carol), Robert Reed (Mike), Maureen McCormick (Marcia). Front (L-R): Susan Olsen (Cindy), Mike Lookinland (Bobby).

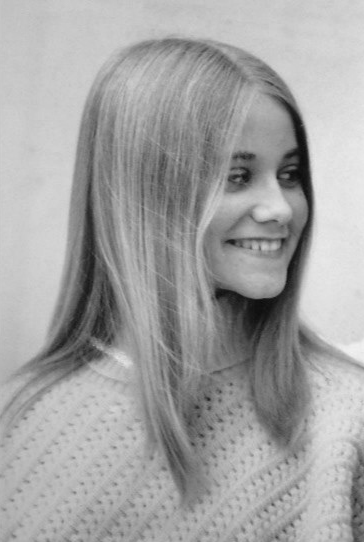
McCormick's most famous role was as eldest daughter Marcia Brady on the classic 1970s sitcom The Brady Bunch.

McCormick played the eldest daughter, Marcia, who had five siblings in The Brady Bunch, an American television sitcom about a blended family that aired from late 1969 to early 1974 on ABC, on Friday nights. She had a perky and popular personality. After its cancellation, the series was later rebroadcast in syndication for decades, as children's programming, gathering long-lasting, cross-generational popularity that led to spinoffs and movies. McCormick had a sporadic romance with her Brady Bunch co-star Barry Williams during the original series' run.

McCormick also voiced Marcia in the first season of the ABC Saturday morning cartoon The Brady Kids from 1972 to 1973. She recorded four albums with the Brady Bunch cast and toured with them as well. In 1972, she released her first solo single with the songs "Truckin' Back to You" and "Teeny Weeny Bit (Too Long)". The following year, McCormick recorded an album with her Brady Bunch co-star Christopher Knight, a pop recording titled Chris Knight and Maureen McCormick, which carried both duets and solo tracks. McCormick's second solo single "Little Bird", backed with "Just a Singin' Alone", had mild chart success in the western United States (reaching the top five at KCPX in Salt Lake City). McCormick later performed "Little Bird" on American Bandstand, where host Dick Clark encouraged her to follow a singing career. McCormick released another single in 1973, "Love's in the Roses", backed with "Harmonize".

In 2015, archive footage of McCormick as Marcia was used for an American TV commercial advertising Snickers chocolate bars. The commercial, which debuted during Super Bowl XLIX, features action film star Danny Trejo as young Marcia who (in the context of being hungry) is not acting like herself. After eating a Snickers, Marcia appears as McCormick once again.

=== 1975–2006: Other roles and personal struggles ===
Following the cancellation of The Brady Bunch, McCormick spent years addicted to cocaine and quaaludes, which impeded her career. McCormick later stated that she sometimes traded sex for drugs during her early 20s. She flubbed an audition with Steven Spielberg for a part in Raiders of the Lost Ark (1981), arriving for the audition under the influence of cocaine and having not slept for three days. She developed a reputation in Hollywood for being unreliable, to the point that one producer threatened that she would never work as an actress again. She also dealt with bouts of depression and bulimia.

Despite her struggles with addiction and depression, McCormick did appear in guest roles on numerous television series throughout the 1970s and 1980s, such as Happy Days, Donny & Marie, The Love Boat, Vega$, The Streets of San Francisco and Fantasy Island, along with supporting roles in The Idolmaker and B movies such as A Vacation in Hell (1979) and Skatetown, U.S.A. (1979). McCormick later claimed she failed to get a role as a prostitute or heroin dealer for the movie Midnight Express because she continued to be identified with her Brady Bunch role. She reprised her role as Marcia Brady on the short-lived series The Brady Bunch Hour from 1976 to 1977, and The Brady Brides in 1981, which was spun off from the movie The Brady Girls Get Married (1981). McCormick portrayed Wendy Darling in a touring stage production of Peter Pan, beginning in 1983.

McCormick married Michael Cummings on March 16, 1985. Shortly after getting married, McCormick went through a series of interventions, stints in rehabilitation, and experimental therapies. She was treated by psychologist Eugene Landy, and later claimed that his brand of psychopharmacology, for which he eventually lost his medical license, worsened her addictions because he prescribed her so many medications. She began to get sober after marrying, but she still suffered from depression and paranoia, and once threatened to jump from a balcony in front of her husband. She and her husband were at first wary of medication, but McCormick was treated with antidepressants such as Prozac beginning in the 1990s. McCormick also said that she was helped by her friendships with former Brady Bunch cast members.

She continued to appear sporadically in films and television projects, having a minor role as a police officer in Return to Horror High (1987), and again reprising her Marcia Brady role for the television film A Very Brady Christmas (1988). McCormick gave birth to a daughter in May 1989. When The Bradys, a revival of The Brady Bunch, was scheduled to begin production in 1990, McCormick was unavailable to return as Marcia because she was busy caring for her infant daughter, so Leah Ayres filled the role, instead. In 1993, she played herself in the Herman's Head episode "When Hermy Met Maureen McCormick". In 1994, McCormick made her Broadway debut as Betty Rizzo in a production of Grease.

McCormick released her debut studio album, When You Get a Little Lonely, on April 4, 1995, as an audio CD and cassette. The album was later made available as a digital download. The album was released under Phantom Hill Records, a record label owned by her brother. McCormick promoted it with live performances in Palmdale, California, and CD signings. When You Get a Little Lonely received negative reviews from music critics, though McCormick's vocals did receive some praise. In a retrospective interview with Entertainment Weekly, McCormick said that she was disappointed by the recording process for the album, and would have preferred to write at least one of her own songs.

In 1997, she portrayed country singer Barbara Mandrell in the television biopic Get to the Heart: The Barbara Mandrell Story. In 2000, McCormick was the first actress to play Rebecca Crane on the soap opera Passions, but she was not put on contract. In 2003, McCormick appeared as herself on an episode of the sitcom Scrubs with references being made to her Marcia Brady character.

=== 2007–present: Reality series and other work ===
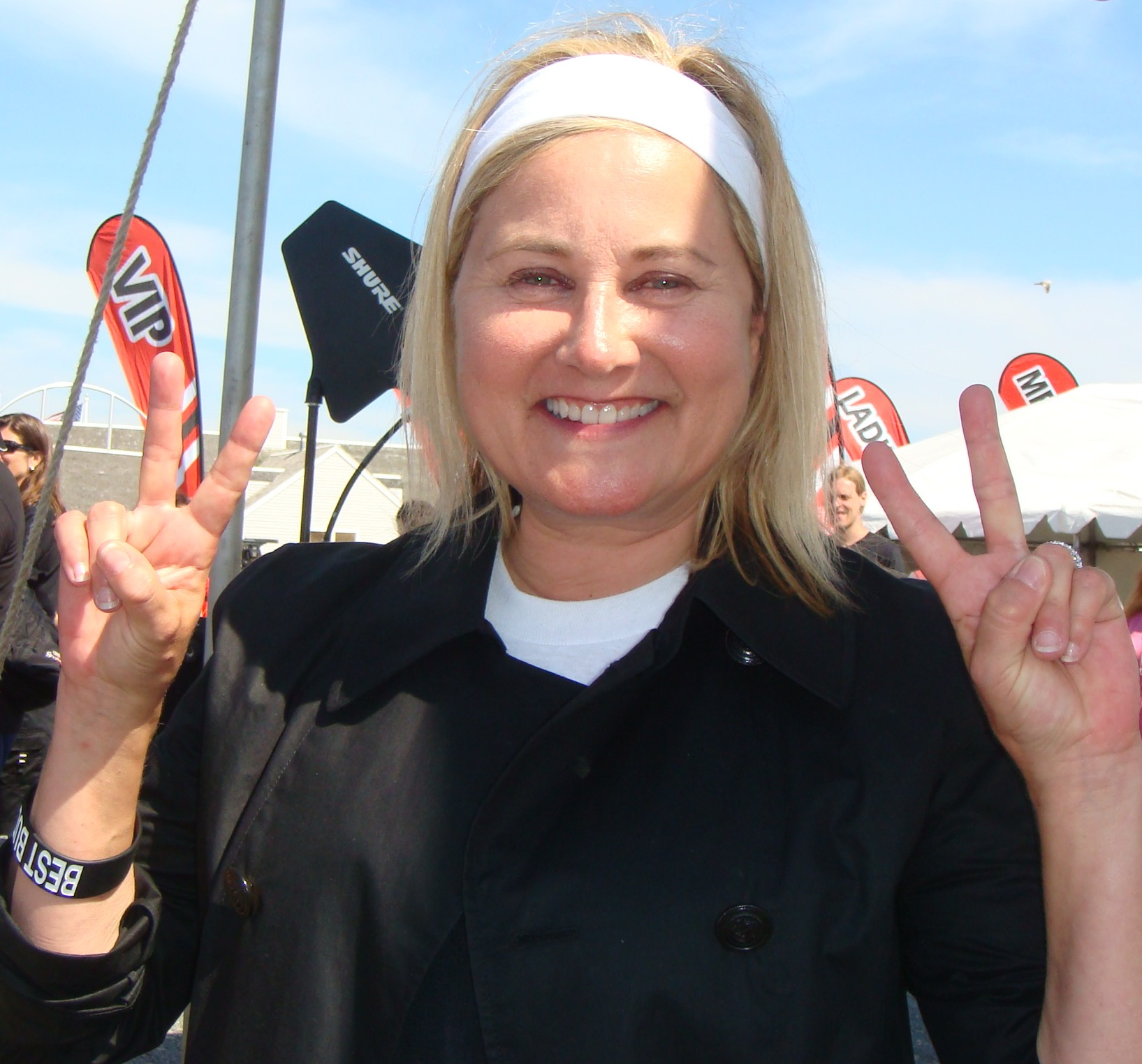
McCormick in 2009

In April 2007, McCormick appeared on Dr. Phil to discuss a family dispute, accusing her brother Kevin of both elder abuse and alienating their father from his other children to gain control of his finances. The same year, McCormick joined the cast of the fifth season of VH1's reality show Celebrity Fit Club, hoping to lose 30 pounds (14 kg) she had gained since her mother died of cancer and needing to move her disabled brother into an assisted living facility. McCormick lost 34 pounds (15 kg), and in June of that year, was the individual winner of the series.

McCormick released her autobiography, Here's the Story: Surviving Marcia Brady and Finding My True Voice, on October 14, 2008. It debuted at number four on The New York Times bestseller list, where it stayed for three weeks. The book was published by HarperCollins. While promoting the book, McCormick was a guest on many news and talk shows such as Access Hollywood, The Howard Stern Show, Good Day L.A., and Paula's Party.

Also in 2008, she joined the cast of the CMT reality show Gone Country, where she competed for a recording contract. This led to a spin-off reality series called Outsiders Inn, in which she opened a bed and breakfast in Newport, Tennessee. In 2008, McCormick became a spokesperson for Children International. In March 2009, McCormick appeared on Comedy Central's roast of Larry the Cable Guy.

In 2015, McCormick appeared in the Australian version of I'm a Celebrity...Get Me Out of Here!, where she lasted 42 days and was the last evictee before the finale.

On August 30, 2016, McCormick was revealed as one of the celebrities who would compete on season 23 of Dancing with the Stars. She was partnered with professional dancer Artem Chigvintsev. McCormick and Chigvintsev were eliminated on the seventh week of competition and finished in 8th place. She joined with the other surviving main cast members of The Brady Bunch in the 2019 television series A Very Brady Renovation on HGTV.

In 2020, she was named a global ambassador for Special Olympics International. In 2021, McCormick paired up with contractor/decorator Dan Vickery in HGTV's new series Frozen in Time, a home remodeling series.

== Biographical portrayals ==
Kaley Cuoco portrayed Maureen McCormick in Growing Up Brady (2000). McCormick's character Marcia Brady has been portrayed by Christine Taylor in The Brady Bunch Movie (1995) and its sequel A Very Brady Sequel and by Autumn Reeser in the made for TV sequel The Brady Bunch in the White House.

== Discography ==
=== Studio albums ===
Year	Album details
1995	When You Get a Little Lonely: Release date: April 4, 1995; Label: Phantom Hill Records

== Filmography ==
=== Film ===
Year	Title	Role	Notes
1973	Young Marriage	Beth	Short
1976	Pony Express Rider	Rose of Sharon	
1977	Moonshine County Express	Sissy Hammer	
1979	Take Down	Brooke Cooper	
1979	Skatetown, U.S.A.	Susan Nelson	
1980	The Idolmaker	Ellen Fields	
1981	Texas Lightning	Fay	
1983	Shout for Joy	Alma Irons	
1987	Return to Horror High	Officer Tyler	
1996	A Very Brady Sequel	Kitty (voice)	
1997	Dogtown	Didi Schmidt	
1999	Baby Huey's Great Easter Adventure	Nick's Mom	Direct-to-video
2000	The Million Dollar Kid	Betsy Hunter	
2001	Title to Murder	Leah Farrell	
2002	Jane White Is Sick & Twisted	Nancy	
2003	Dickie Roberts: Former Child Star	Maureen McCormick	
2012	Snow White: A Deadly Summer	Eve	
2015	Lift Me Up	Grace	
2015	Big Baby	Molly	
2016	Accidentally Engaged	Jeannette	
2017	The Neighborhood	Rachelle	
2017	Aileron	Helen	Short
2017	Rock Paper Dead	Nurse Ruland	

=== Television ===
Year	Title	Role	Notes
1964–1965	Bewitched	Young Endora	"And Something Makes Three", "Trick or Treat"
1965	The Farmer's Daughter	Christine	"Why Don't They Ever Pick Me?"
1965	Honey West	Margaret Mary Driscoll	"In the Bag"
1965–1966	Camp Runamuck	Maureen Sullivan	"Who Stole My Bathtub?", "Tomboy"
1966	I Dream of Jeannie	Susan	"My Master, the Doctor"
1967	My Three Sons	Sylvia Walters	"Ernie, the Bluebeard"
1969–1974	The Brady Bunch	Marcia Brady	Main role
1972	The ABC Saturday Superstar Movie	Marcia Brady (voice)	"The Brady Kids on Mysterious Island"
1972–1973	The Brady Kids	Marcia Brady (voice)	Main role (season 1)
1973	Marcus Welby, M.D.	Sharon Boyd	"The Day After Forever"
1975	Happy Days	Hildie	"Cruisin'"
1975	Harry O	Nancy Wayne	"Street Games"
1975	Joe Forrester	Irene Kellogg	"Bus Station"
1976	The Streets of San Francisco	Cindy Lawson	"No Minor Vices"
1976	Gibbsville	Alice Chapman	"All the Young Girls"
1976–1977	The Brady Bunch Hour	Marcia Brady	Main role
1977	Delvecchio	Lynette Youndfellow	"One Little Indian"
1977	The Hardy Boys/Nancy Drew Mysteries	Karen Phillips	"Nancy Drew's Love Match"
1977–1982	The Love Boat	Various roles	5 episodes
1978	Vega$	Jenny Logan	"The Pageant"
1978–1983	Fantasy Island	Various roles	6 episodes
1979	Insight	Jenny	"When, Jenny? When?"
1979	Lou Grant	Tiffany	"Sweep"
1979	A Vacation in Hell	Margret	TV film
1979	The Runaways	Janet	"Throwaway Child"
1981	The Brady Brides	Marcia Brady Logan	Main role
1983	Rosie	Ally Parker	"Minute Waltz"
1986	New Love, American Style	Dr. Patty White	"Love and the F.M. Doctor"
1988	A Very Brady Christmas	Marcia Brady Logan	TV film
1989	Day by Day	Marcia Brady	"A Very Brady Episode"
1993	Bradymania: A Very Brady Special	Maureen McCormick	TV film
1993	Herman's Head	Maureen McCormick	"When Hermy Met Maureen McCormick"
1996	The Single Guy	Valerie	"Kept Man"
1997	Touched by an Angel	Jodi	"Clipped Wings"
1997	Get to the Heart: The Barbara Mandrell Story	Barbara Mandrell	TV film
1997–1998	Teen Angel	Judy Beauchamp	Regular role
1997–2003	Johnny Bravo	Various roles (voice)	3 episodes
1999	Moesha	Sales Rep	"Isn't She Lovely?"
2000	Passions	Rebecca Hotchkiss	Regular role
2000–2002	Son of the Beach	Mrs. Strawther	"South of Her Border", "The Sexorcist", "Godfather Knows Best"
2000–2002	The Amanda Show	Moody's Mom	"Moody's Point"
2001	It's Like, You Know...	Maureen McCormick	"Lust for Life"
2002	The Ellen Show	Rita Carter	"Shallow Gal"
2003	The Brothers García	Mrs. Bauer	"Moving on Up"
2003	Scrubs	Maureen McCormick	"My Journey"
2004	The Brady Bunch 35th Anniversary Reunion Special	Maureen McCormick	TV film
2011	Christmas Spirit	Sarah	TV film
2014	Naughty & Nice	Kate	TV film
2015	I'm a Celebrity...Get Me Out of Here!	Maureen McCormack	Reality TV - Australian series
2015	Christmas Land	Glinda Stanwick	TV film
2016	Nightmare Next Door	Marian Justi	"Orange Grove Cruelty"
2016	Dancing with the Stars	Herself	Contestant on season 23
2017	The Loud House	Jancey (voice)	"Future Tense"
2017	The Guest Book	Maureen McCormick	"Story Nine"
2019	A Very Brady Renovation	Maureen McCormick	TV series
2019	Macy's Thanksgiving Cake Spectacular: Cakes on Parade	Maureen McCormick host	TV series
2023	Fantasy Island	Rosemarie	1 episode (Season 2, Episode 4: “Mystery in Miami”)

== Stage credits ==
Year	Title	Role	Notes	Ref.
1983	Peter Pan	Wendy Darling	Touring national production	
1994	Grease	Betty Rizzo	Eugene O'Neill Theatre	

== Awards and nominations ==
Year	Presenter	Award	Result
2005–2006	TV Land Awards	Choice Dream Sequence	Nominated
2005	TV Land Awards	Choice Singing Siblings (shared with the kids of The Brady Bunch)	Nominated
2006	TV Land Awards	Most Beautiful Braces	Nominated
2007	TV Land Award	Pop Culture Award	Won
