= Lynn Latham =

Lynn or Lynne Latham may refer to:

- Lynn Marie Latham, television producer
- Lynne Latham, also credited as Lynn Latham, dancer and fashion designer
