= Truelove: The Film =

2023 American documentary

- Truelove: The Film – one sheet
- Directed by: Phil Viardo
- Produced by: Christine Blake; Jeff Androsky; Phil Viardo
- Starring: Christopher Knight; Wynonna Judd; Carrie Underwood; Darius Rucker; Dierks Bentley; Michael Ray
- Cinematography: Kort Waddell
- Edited by: Ty Greene
- Production company: Former Prodigy Media
- Release date: April 2023 (Beverly Hills Film Festival)
- Country: United States
- Language: English
- Budget: $300,000

Truelove: The Film is a 2023 American documentary film directed by Phil Viardo and featuring Christopher Knight, Wynonna Judd, and Carrie Underwood. It tells the story of Callie Truelove, a teenage girl with Williams syndrome, who travels around the United States to raise awareness about the rare genetic disorder. The film is the winner of the Audience Choice Award: Best Documentary Feature Film at the 22nd Annual Beverly Hills Film Festival.

== Plot ==
Truelove: The Film is a documentary that offers a perspective into the life of Callie Truelove, a teenage girl who has Williams syndrome, a rare genetic disorder caused by the deletion of specific genes on chromosome 7. This condition can cause physical and developmental challenges, but it also makes the person highly sociable. The movie follows Callie's journey across the United States as she meets other people with Williams syndrome and their families, spreading love and raising awareness about the condition.

It's not what's wrong with them, its what's wrong with us

— Christopher Knight, Truelove: The Film,

== Cast ==
All cast members are portraying themselves.

- Callie Truelove
- Tabitha Truelove
- Christopher Knight
- Wynonna Judd
- Carrie Underwood
- Darius Rucker
- Dierks Bentley
- Michael Ray

== Awards and honors ==
Awards
Award	Category	Venue	Outcome	Ref
Best Documentary Feature Film	Audience Choice Award	22nd Annual Beverly Hills Film Festival	Won	
Honorable Mention	—N/a	Richmond International Film Festival	—N/a	
Courage Award	Special Jury Awards	2022 Awareness Film Festival	Won	
Official selection	—N/a	Catalina Film Festival	—N/a	
Best documentary feature	Audience choice	California Independent Film Festival	Won	

== See also ==
- Christopher Knight Brands
- Callie Trulove (Self) (2020). Dog Tales (Documentary). NOVA. United States: PBS.
