= List of The Brady Bunch characters =

Characters of The Brady Bunch (Mouse over to identify)

The following is a list and description of the primary characters from the classic American television series The Brady Bunch, that was broadcast from September 1969 to March 1974. The characters also appeared in all subsequent reunions, remakes, and theatrical/TV films.

== Cast ==
Character	The Brady Bunch (1969–74)	The Brady Kids (1972–73)	The Brady Bunch Hour (1976–77)	The Brady Girls Get Married (1981)	The Brady Brides (1981)	A Very Brady Christmas (1988)	The Bradys (1990)	The Brady Bunch Movie (1995)	A Very Brady Sequel (1996)	The Brady Bunch in the White House (2002)
=== Brady family ===
Mike Brady	Robert Reed		Robert Reed	Robert Reed		Robert Reed	Robert Reed	Gary Cole	Gary Cole	Gary Cole
Carol Brady	Florence Henderson		Florence Henderson	Florence Henderson	Florence Henderson	Florence Henderson	Florence Henderson	Shelley Long	Shelley Long	Shelley Long
Greg Brady	Barry Williams	Barry Williams Lane Scheimer	Barry Williams	Barry Williams		Barry Williams	Barry Williams	Christopher Daniel Barnes	Christopher Daniel Barnes	Chad Doreck
Marcia Brady	Maureen McCormick	Maureen McCormick Erika Scheimer	Maureen McCormick	Maureen McCormick	Maureen McCormick	Maureen McCormick	Leah Ayres	Christine Taylor	Christine Taylor	Autumn Reeser
Peter Brady	Christopher Knight	Christopher Knight	Christopher Knight	Christopher Knight		Christopher Knight	Christopher Knight	Paul Sutera	Paul Sutera	Blake Foster
Jan Brady	Eve Plumb	Eve Plumb	Geri Reischl	Eve Plumb	Eve Plumb	Eve Plumb	Eve Plumb	Jennifer Elise Cox	Jennifer Elise Cox	Ashley Drane
Bobby Brady	Mike Lookinland	Mike Lookinland	Mike Lookinland	Mike Lookinland		Mike Lookinland	Mike Lookinland	Jesse Lee	Jesse Lee	Max Morrow
Cindy Brady	Susan Olsen	Susan Olsen	Susan Olsen	Susan Olsen		Jennifer Runyon	Susan Olsen	Olivia Hack	Olivia Hack	Sofia Vassilieva
Alice Nelson	Ann B. Davis		Ann B. Davis	Ann B. Davis	Ann B. Davis	Ann B. Davis	Ann B. Davis	Henriette Mantel	Henriette Mantel	Tannis Burnett
=== Supporting cast members ===
Sam Franklin	Allan Melvin					Lewis Arquette		David Graf		
Cousin Oliver	Robbie Rist									
Jack Merrill			Rip Taylor							
Wally Logan				Jerry Houser	Jerry Houser	Jerry Houser	Jerry Houser			
Phillip Covington III				Ron Kuhlman	Ron Kuhlman	Ron Kuhlman	Ron Kuhlman			
Nora Brady						Caryn Richman	Caryn Richman			
Valerie Thomas						Carol Huston	Mary Cadorette			
Jessica Logan						Jaclyn Bernstein	Jaclyn Bernstein			
Mickey Logan						G.W. Lee	Michael Melby			
Kevin Brady						Zachary Bostrom	Jonathan Taylor Thomas			
Roy Martin									Tim Matheson	
President Lawrence Randolph										Dave Nichols

== Main characters ==
=== Mike Brady ===
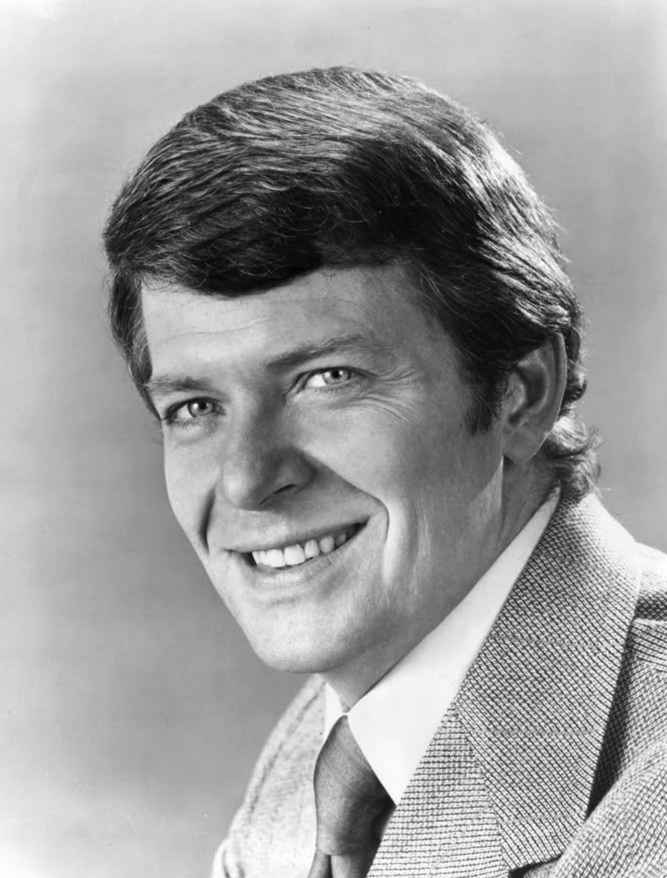
Mike, as portrayed in the original series by Robert Reed

Michael Paul "Mike" Brady (bottom center in picture above), portrayed by Robert Reed in the TV show and Gary Cole in films, is the male head of the Brady household. In episode #4 of The Bradys, "Hat in the Ring", when Mike is sworn in as City Councilman, his full name is given as Michael Thomas Brady. Mike, a widowed architect, brought three sons to his marriage with Carol Martin and became the stepfather to her three daughters. He was named "Father of the Year" by a local newspaper after his stepdaughter Marcia submitted an essay in his honor. The character's parents were sometimes mentioned but never seen (unless depicted without identification at the wedding in the pilot), but his paternal grandfather, Judge Hank Brady (Robert Reed in a dual role), appears in one episode.

Shortly into the fourth season, Mike Brady grew his hair into a longer, curly style. While men getting a perm or growing an Afro was in style at the time, Mike's perm happened by accident: as revealed by Florence Henderson decades later, Robert Reed had naturally curly hair and had been using chemicals to keep it straightened. Only when the cast flew to Hawaii did they discover its curliness, due to the humidity of the tropical climate there. Mike Brady became associated with a perm in all other iterations of the Brady family in the decades since. As Gary Cole's hair was not as naturally curly (as seen in his other roles such as Bill Lumbergh in Office Space), he wore a wig when portraying Mike.

Mike had a firm personal integrity (for example, he refuses to participate in a commercial if it means saying that an inferior product is the best) coupled with a strong sense of ethics. Mike enjoyed fishing and camping.

The writers imply that Mike Brady is a very highly qualified and well-respected architect. His "failures" tended to be successes. For instance, in A Very Brady Christmas, contractor Ted Roberts (who is looking to save money on his building project) fires Mike when he refuses to cut corners and take out important safety provisions. Mike, however, is later proven right when the structure begins to crumble (trapping two security guards, and later Mike, inside). In the episode "How to Succeed in Business?" Mike acknowledges that he has lost jobs. This is to reassure his son Peter that failure and getting fired are a part of life.

Mike was one of the staff architects with the firm where he worked; its name was never mentioned in the series. Mr. Ed Phillips was his boss until the final episodes of the series, when it was Harry Matthews. By the time A Very Brady Christmas and The Bradys aired, Mike was the senior partner at the firm.

Both Gene Hackman and Jeffrey Hunter were considered for the role of Mike Brady. Hackman was Sherwood Schwartz's first choice, but he was rejected by Paramount for not having enough experience. Jeffrey Hunter wanted to play Mike Brady, but Schwartz felt Hunter was too attractive to play a down-to-earth architect.

In 2004, TV Guide ranked Mike Brady number 14 on its 50 Greatest TV Dads of All Time list.

=== Carol Brady ===
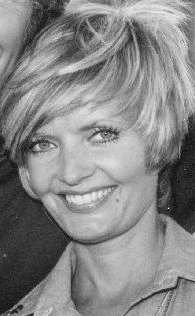
Carol, as portrayed in the original series by Florence Henderson

Caroline Ann "Carol" Brady – f/k/a Caroline Ann "Carol" Martin, née Caroline Ann Tyler (top center), portrayed by Florence Henderson in the TV series and Shelley Long in movies, is the wife of Mike Brady. At the beginning of the pilot, her last name is Martin from her first marriage, during which she had had three daughters. She gains three stepsons when she marries Mike Brady. Carol enjoys singing in the church choir, and with her daughter Marcia in the high school Family Frolic Talent Show. In the episode "A Fistful of Reasons", in which Cindy is bullied because of her lisp, Carol confesses that she too overcame a lisp while growing up in Swampscott, Massachusetts. Her parents, Mr. and Mrs. Henry Tyler (J. Pat O'Malley and Joan Tompkins), are depicted only in the pilot "The Honeymoon", and her maternal grandmother, Connie Hutchins (Florence Henderson), appears in "You're Never Too Old". She has an unseen brother, Jack, and sister-in-law, Pauline (the parents of Cousin Oliver).

During the original Brady Bunch series, Carol is a stay-at-home mother. In the sequels, she becomes a real estate agent, converting the boys' old room into her home office.

How Carol's previous marriage ended (i.e., due to a death or divorce) is not mentioned. Creator and executive producer Sherwood Schwartz had originally intended for Carol to be a divorcee, but ABC refused to allow the fate of her first marriage to be revealed on the show. Sherwood Schwartz later wished to use her divorce to his advantage, and wanted to use Carol's previous husband as a mechanism to replace Robert Reed on the show should the show enter its sixth season. The show was canceled before Schwartz could execute his plan.

In 2009, Carol was included in Yahoo!'s Top 10 TV Moms from Six Decades of Television for the time period 1969–1974. She was also listed in the Top 5 Classic TV Moms by Film.com.

=== Greg Brady ===
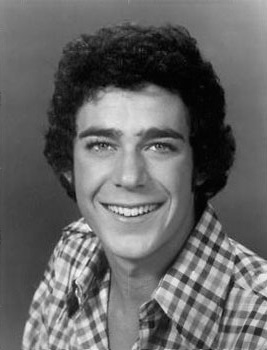
Greg, as portrayed in the original series by Barry Williams

Gregory "Greg" Brady (top right), portrayed by Barry Williams in the TV show, Christopher Daniel Barnes in theatrical films, and Chad Doreck in the TV movie, is the oldest Brady son. Greg is a Westdale High School student who plays football, plays guitar, surfs, and aspires to be a singer. Greg is portrayed as self-confident and brassy at times, and generally acts as leader and spokesman for the other kids. Being the oldest of the Brady children, Greg is usually the one who devises their plans. As the series went on, Greg became somewhat of a "ladies' man" at school. Also as the character got older, Greg often attempted to disassociate himself from the younger siblings, eventually getting his own room in the attic.

Despite this, Greg always sticks up for his younger siblings and helps them out whenever he can. He also frequently shows an ample sense of fair play, as when he refused to go along with a classmate's plan to spread a false rumor about Marcia at school. However, he has been known to cross the lines when he believes the situation warrants it (specifically, when he created a phony playbook to thwart a cheating quarterback from a rival high school). He has also been known to use the line, "Something suddenly came up", to break off a date (without giving a further explanation) so he can go out with a more desirable girl.

Greg's dream of becoming a singer almost comes true when he was handpicked by record producers to be a pop singer under the stage name "Johnny Bravo"; however, he walked away from a potentially lucrative deal when he found out his recordings were being electronically "sweetened" and that the producers were more interested in the visual product than substance. "They didn't want me; they wanted a robot", he said about the incident.

Greg eventually became an obstetrician (as mentioned in A Very Brady Christmas). He and his wife Nora, a nurse, have a son named Kevin. Greg is the only one of the children to appear in every episode of the original series.

=== Marcia Brady ===
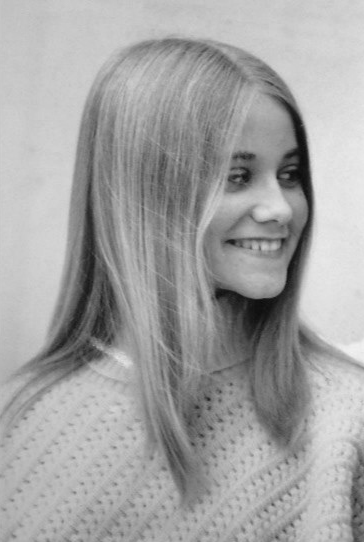
Marcia, as portrayed in the original series by Maureen McCormick

Marcia Brady, née Marcia Martin, later Marcia Brady-Logan (top left), portrayed by Maureen McCormick in the original TV show, The Brady Girls Get Married, The Brady Brides and A Very Brady Christmas, Leah Ayres in The Bradys, Christine Taylor in theatrical films and Autumn Reeser in the TV movie, is the eldest Brady daughter. Marcia is portrayed as a beautiful, mature, and popular girl at Westdale High School and acts as Greg's second-in-command for the other children. Her popularity is an ongoing source of contempt for her younger sister Jan. She is a great fan of TV-star idols Desi Arnaz Jr. and Davy Jones (both actors, portraying themselves, appeared in their own episode). Despite Marcia's reputation, she has her share of problems, such as unrequited crushes, insecurity over having braces, and insecurity over receiving a swollen nose from a stray football thrown by Peter and thereby acquiring the catchphrase "Oh, my nose!" She has a fragile ego that sometimes goes amok, as shown in "Juliet is the Sun", when after being cast in the lead female role in her school's production of Romeo and Juliet she becomes so hard to get along with that she is dismissed from the role.

In The Brady Girls Get Married, Marcia had graduated from college, became a fashion designer, and marries Wallace "Wally" Logan. However, by the time A Very Brady Christmas aired, she was a stay-at-home mother (raising two children, daughter Jessica and son Michael "Mickey"). She was still unemployed at the beginning of The Bradys, and at this point her ego began to take such a beating she briefly turned to alcohol for solace. By the end of the series, Marcia and her husband, Wally (a toy salesman who was frequently out of work, due to either layoffs or getting fired), join their sisters-in-law (Nora and Tracy) to open a catering business.

=== Peter Brady ===
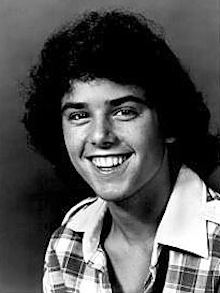
Peter, as portrayed in the original series by Christopher Knight

Peter Brady (right center), portrayed by Christopher Knight in the TV show, Paul Sutera in theatrical films, and Blake Foster in the TV movie, is the middle Brady son. Peter often thinks badly of himself, such as believing he has no personality in the episode "The Personality Kid". The clumsiest of the bunch, he sometimes gets overexcited and acts before thinking. Nevertheless, he is a fun-loving boy whom girls adored later in the original series. He has a non-related lookalike named Arthur Owens (also played by Christopher Knight), who is shown in the episode "Two Petes in a Pod". Peter is also the only one in the family with brown eyes—all the others had blue or green eyes.

Peter later joined the military for career guidance, as seen in The Brady Girls Get Married. In later sequels, he is an administrative assistant (at one point, working under his fiancée, Valerie Thomas; they later end their engagement), and still later, a business partner with Bobby. Peter was the only Brady child to not have a spouse or significant other when The Bradys was cancelled.

=== Jan Brady ===
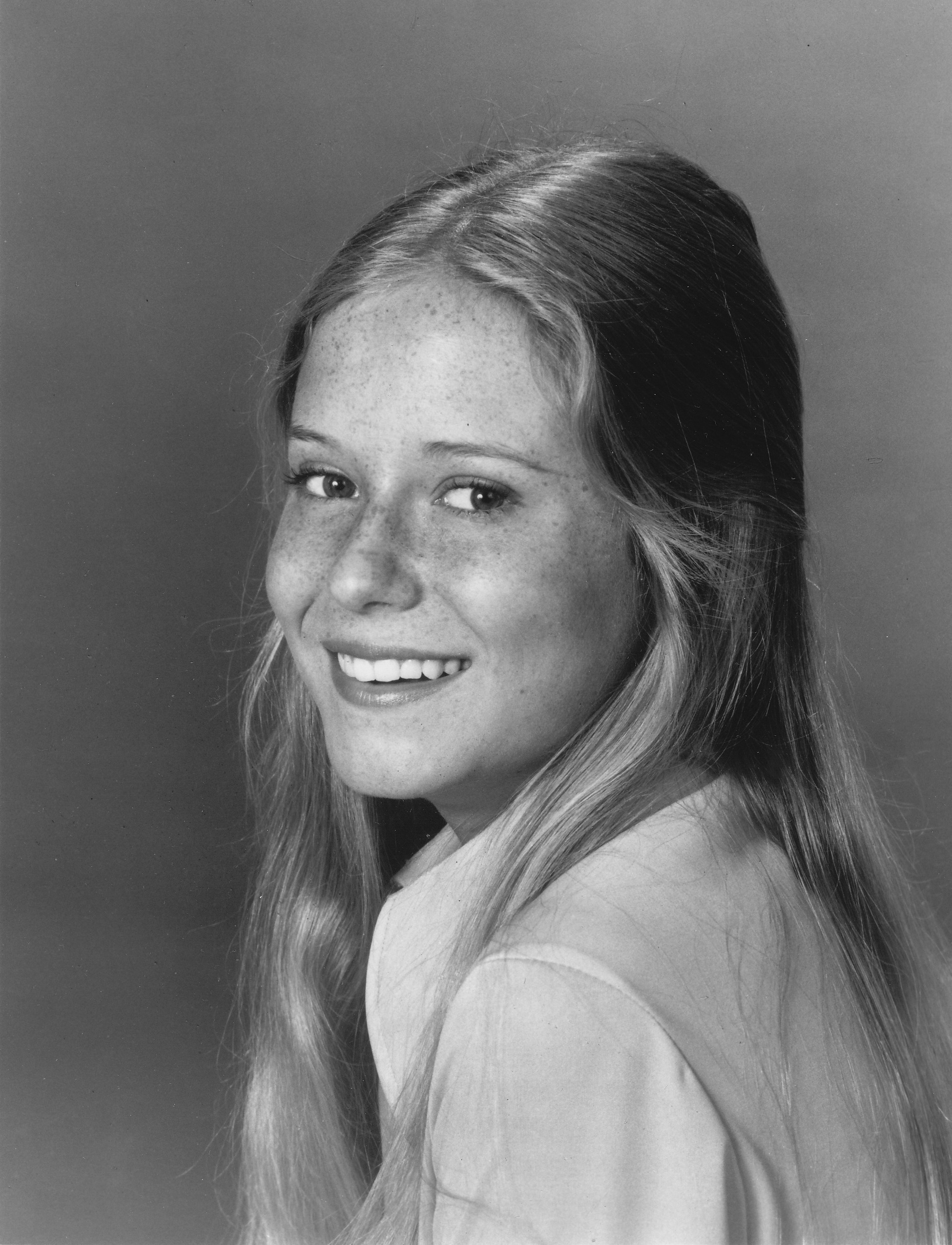
Jan, as portrayed in the original series by Eve Plumb

Janet "Jan" Brady, née Janet "Jan" Martin, later Janet "Jan" Brady-Covington (left center), portrayed by Eve Plumb in the TV series as well as The Brady Girls Get Married, The Brady Brides, A Very Brady Christmas and The Bradys, Geri Reischl in The Brady Bunch Hour variety show, Jennifer Elise Cox in the two theatrical films, and Ashley Drane in the TV movie, is the middle Brady daughter, and many of her storylines often involve Jan being jealous of her more popular older sister, Marcia, or Jan's awkward position as the middle child. In addition, Jan is also insecure about having freckles and wearing glasses, embarrassed about the fact she does not have a boyfriend (later in the series she invents a fictional boyfriend named "George Glass" in an effort to save her reputation), and concerned about her future appearance. In January 2015, this became the subject of an internet meme. A typical plot line surrounding Jan would feature her attempting to carve out her niche in the family, or make a name for herself at school. In the episode "Her Sister's Shadow", in exasperation at constantly being overshadowed by her older sister Marcia, she utters the now famous catch phrase, "Marcia, Marcia, Marcia!". This line would later be parodied in both The Brady Bunch Movie and used in a recurring Saturday Night Live sketch, as well as in the title of the Fanboy & Chum Chum episode "Marcia, Marcia, Marcia".

As a young teen, Jan had a striking resemblance to her great-aunt Jenny (played by Imogene Coca) in her younger days. Jan is also occasionally absent-minded, once losing the tube containing her father's architectural plans while visiting Kings Island amusement park. In her later high school years, Jan found she had a talent for painting (as does Eve Plumb), which likely led to her career choice as an architect, following in her adopted father's footsteps (as shown in later reunion films).

In The Brady Girls Get Married, Jan marries Phillip Covington III. The two met in college; he was her professor. The Covingtons briefly separate in A Very Brady Christmas, but they reconcile. However, they are unable to conceive their own children and in The Bradys adopt a Korean girl named Patty.

Child actress Debi Storm (who later appeared on The Brady Bunch episode "My Fair Opponent" as Molly) was producer Sherwood Schwartz's original choice to play Jan Brady in the original series, until he decided to cast all blondes for the roles of the three daughters.

Cox said in a 2015 interview that one of the reasons she auditioned for The Brady Bunch Movie was that she was a fan of the original series, and that she used method acting during the film.

Film critic Roger Ebert praised the character in The Brady Bunch Movie, saying that "a lot of the humor in the movie comes from the burning jealousy Jan feels for her popular older sister, Marcia".

=== Bobby Brady ===
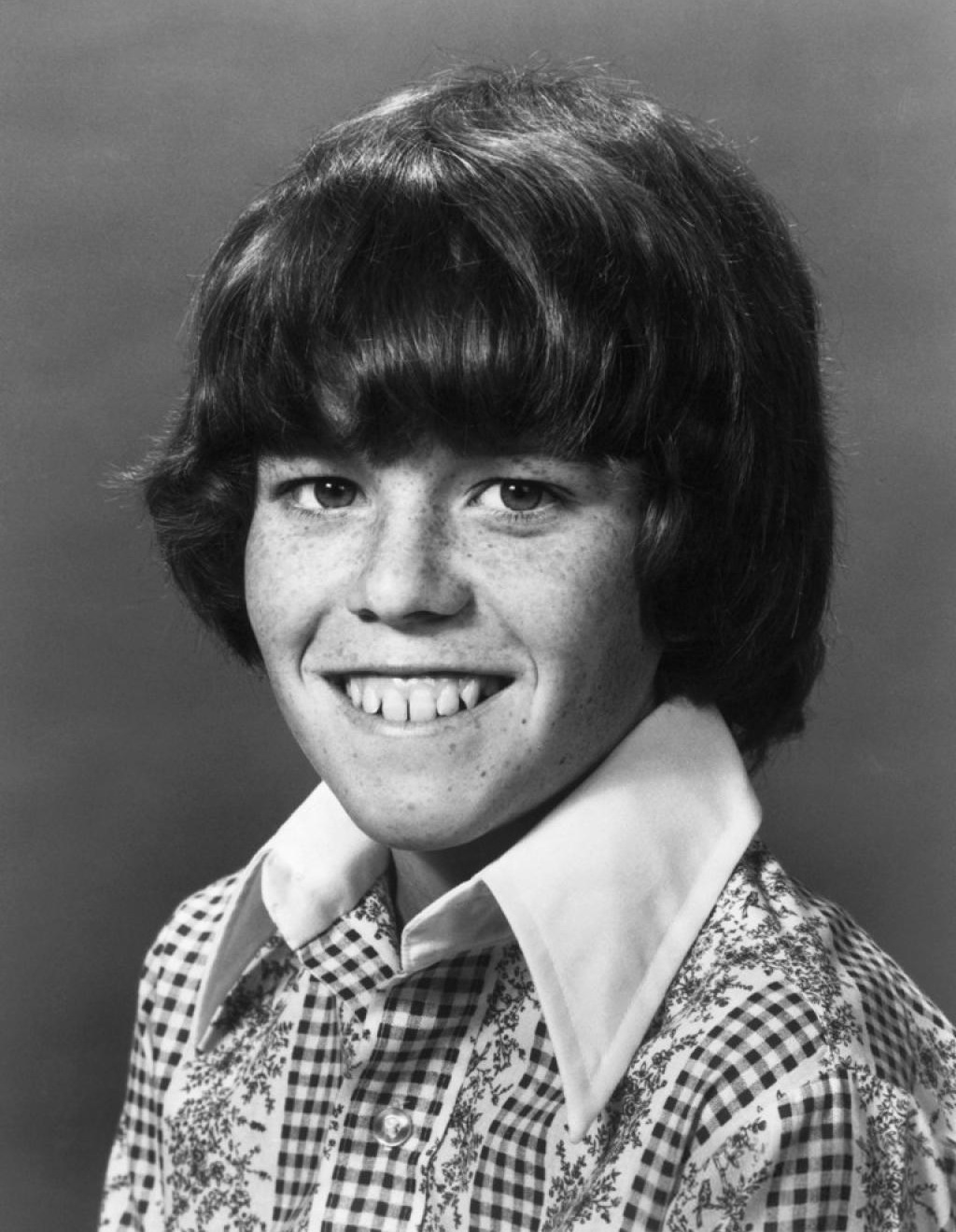
Bobby, as portrayed in the original series by Mike Lookinland

Robert "Bobby" Brady (bottom right), portrayed by Mike Lookinland in the TV show, Jesse Soffer (credited as Jesse Lee) in the theatrical films, and Max Morrow in the TV movie, is the youngest Brady son. The clever and often overlooked youngest boy, Bobby was often portrayed as a whimsical dreamer, fantasizing about having various adventurous lifestyles, such as being a race car driver, a cowboy, and an astronaut. On one occasion, one of his fantasies came true when he got to play football with Joe Namath.

On another occasion, Bobby became a professional race car driver, which led to a crash and Bobby's paralysis on The Bradys. Bobby is going through rehabilitative therapy when he marries his girlfriend, Tracy Wagner (Martha Quinn). Bobby—who had dropped out of business school to pursue his dream of racing cars—resumes his originally intended career path, joining Peter in a business venture.

=== Cindy Brady ===
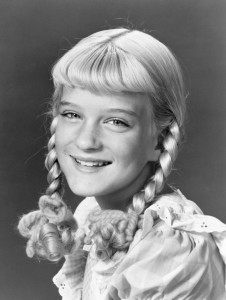
Cindy, as portrayed in the original series by Susan Olsen

Cynthia "Cindy" Brady, née Cynthia "Cindy" Martin (bottom left), portrayed by Susan Olsen in the TV show, The Brady Bunch Hour, The Brady Girls Get Married and The Bradys, Jennifer Runyon in A Very Brady Christmas, Olivia Hack in the theatrical films and Sofia Vassilieva in the 2002 TV movie, is the youngest Brady daughter. She was portrayed as a naive, but occasionally precocious little girl, who was most often seen wearing her hair in corkscrew curls or braids and had a pronounced lisp. She frequently liked to snoop and share secrets she had found out. In one episode, the family had to help her correct her habit of tattling. Cindy Brady also had various failed attempts at fame, such as attempting to break a world record for teeter-tottering, appearing on a game show (on which she suffered from stage fright and had a catatonic attack), and trying to become "the new Shirley Temple". However, she does play a pivotal role in helping Bobby meet boyhood idol Joe Namath by signing Bobby's name to a letter stating he is "really, really sick".

On The Bradys, Cindy became a disc jockey (much like Susan Olsen herself did). At the radio station, she becomes romantically involved with her boss, Gary Greenberg (Ken Michelman), a Jewish widower who is more than 15 years her senior and has two children. The relationship did not have time to develop before The Bradys was cancelled.

Throughout her time playing Cindy, Susan Olsen herself regarded the character to be too stupid. However, she could adapt, with her mother encouraging her that Cindy Brady was intended to be cute.

=== Alice Nelson ===
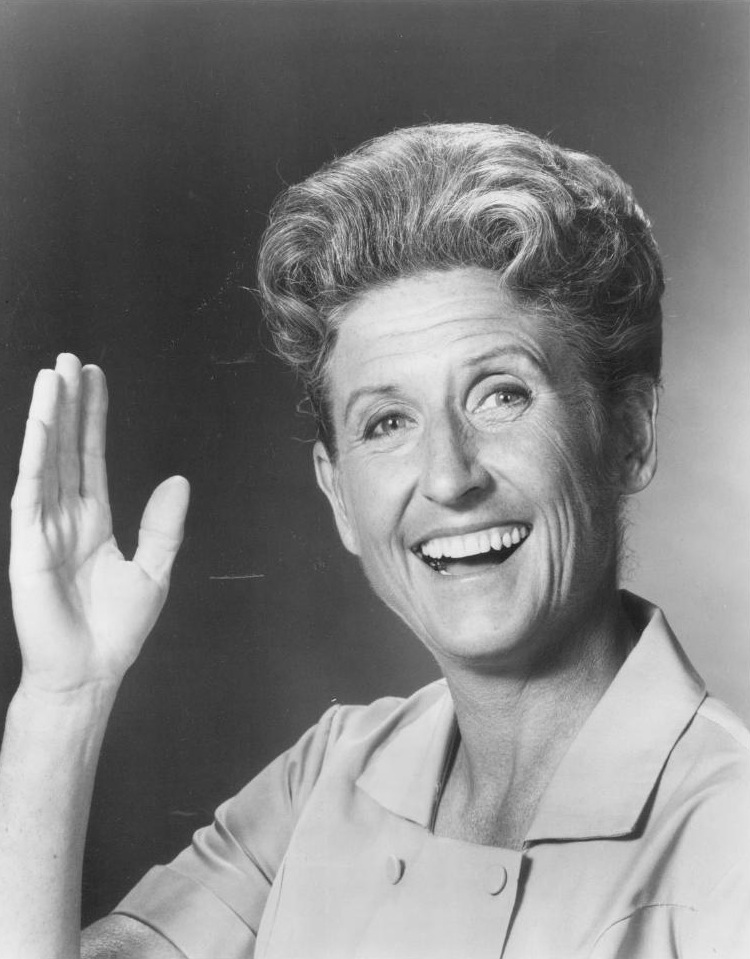
Alice, as portrayed by Ann B. Davis

Alice Nelson (center) is the housekeeper to the Brady family. She was portrayed by Ann B. Davis.

Alice grew up in the same neighborhood as the Bradys, graduating from Westdale High School, the school Greg and Marcia attended in the series. Alice was the housekeeper to Mike Brady, his previous wife (who died before the series started), and their three boys. Alice stayed on, to be the housekeeper for not only his boys, but for his new wife Carol and her three daughters. Alice was generally impartial toward the children, although she presented Jan with a locket at one point, "from one middle sister to another".

Alice was best known for telling jokes (often self-deprecating, and usually interspersed with drier humor than the rest of the Brady clan), which were almost invariably met with "Oh, Alice!" responses. Alice was also known for her sky-blue housekeeping uniform, which she almost always wore. She also joined in the children's games (including playing basketball), and went along with the family on vacations.

Physical activity would sometimes cause Alice to throw her back out, making her immobile for a short period of time.

Alice had an identical cousin, Emma (also played by Davis), who was a retired master sergeant in the Women's Army Corps. Emma once filled in for Alice when Alice traveled out of town. Alice quit her job at one point when she felt the children no longer trusted her, becoming a waitress at a local restaurant. Her replacement Kay (Mary Treen), who did her work faithfully, but never tried to become close with the Bradys, told the kids where to find her ("The Golden Spoon at Fourth and Oak"), and they begged Alice to come back.

For most of the series, Alice dated Sam Franklin (Allan Melvin), who ran the local butcher shop. In the final season, Alice and Sam were engaged. Alice and Sam have won awards in Charleston dancing and bowling, which was parodied in The Brady Bunch Movie, in which Sam gave Alice a new bowling ball instead of an engagement ring. They were married some time after The Brady Bunch left the air in 1974 and before The Brady Girls Get Married.

In the 1990s parody movies, Alice was played by actress Henriette Mantel, while Tannis Burnett played her in the TV movie. In the first film, Davis makes a cameo as a truck driver whose CB handle is "Schultzy". Davis first became popular in the 1950s, playing a character named Schultzy on The Bob Cummings Show.

The role of Alice was originally to have been played by Monty Margetts, but at the last minute the role was recast because producers of the show changed their mind about casting Joyce Bulifant, who was originally cast as Carol Brady, and instead replaced her with Florence Henderson. The producers felt a more comedic, zany housekeeper would balance Henderson's soft-spoken, calm presence.

== Notable recurring characters ==
=== Sam Franklin ===
Sam Franklin is Alice's boyfriend, who owns the local butcher shop. While he is frequently mentioned in dialogue, Sam appears in only eight episodes, although his appearances span all of the seasons. In the made-for-television film The Brady Girls Get Married, Sam had been married to Alice for three and a half years. Sam was portrayed by Allan Melvin. Lewis Arquette portrayed Sam in A Very Brady Christmas, wearing a Santa Claus beard.

The character is mentioned by the Beastie Boys in the lyrics to their 1989 song "Shake Your Rump" ("Like Sam the butcher bringing Alice the meat").

=== Cousin Oliver ===
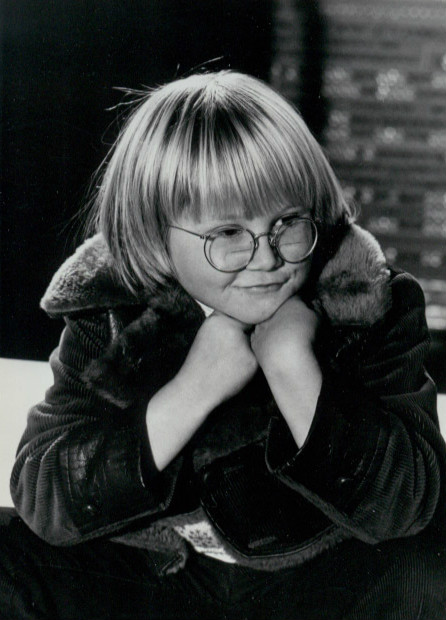
Cousin Oliver, as portrayed by Robbie Rist

Oliver Tyler, frequently referred to as Cousin Oliver, stays with the Brady family during the last six episodes of the fifth and final season of The Brady Bunch. As explained in the episode "Welcome Aboard" from season five, Carol's brother Jack Tyler and his wife Pauline are traveling to an archaeological dig in South America, and because their son Oliver is unable to accompany them, he is sent to live with the Bradys. Cousin Oliver was played by actor Robbie Rist.

Cousin Oliver was eight years old (Rist was actually nine) and very young in contrast to the other kids, all of whom were twelve or older—an apparent attempt to restore some of the appeal the series had enjoyed when the other children were younger. Some fans would later call the addition of Cousin Oliver the moment when the series "jumped the shark". The addition of younger children to sitcoms that seem to have run their course, in an attempt to improve declining ratings has been referred to as "Cousin Oliver syndrome" with The Partridge Family, The Cosby Show, Family Matters, and The Fresh Prince of Bel-Air mentioned as other instances.

Years later, Rist appeared with members of The Brady Bunch cast on a special "Brady" reunion charity episode of the game show The Weakest Link. Introducing himself, he joked: "I hope I don't kill this show too!" Rist ended up being the first "weakest link" of the episode, eliminated by the other contestants.

Cousin Oliver is not seen, mentioned, or referred to in any of the Brady sequel series.

== The Bradys' pets ==
Tiger is the Brady family's dog, who appeared in many of the early episodes. The original dog used was run over by an automobile and died of his injuries before the fourth episode, but a replacement look-alike was found. This version stayed on until partway through the second season, when he was quietly dropped from the series. This paralleled the Bradys' Friday night companion show, The Partridge Family, whose dog Simone also disappeared that year without an explanation. Tiger appeared in a total of ten episodes.

Fluffy is the cat owned by Carol and the Martin girls. Fluffy only appeared in "The Honeymoon" episode from season one, and she was never seen again.
