= Robert Reed =

American actor (1932–1992)

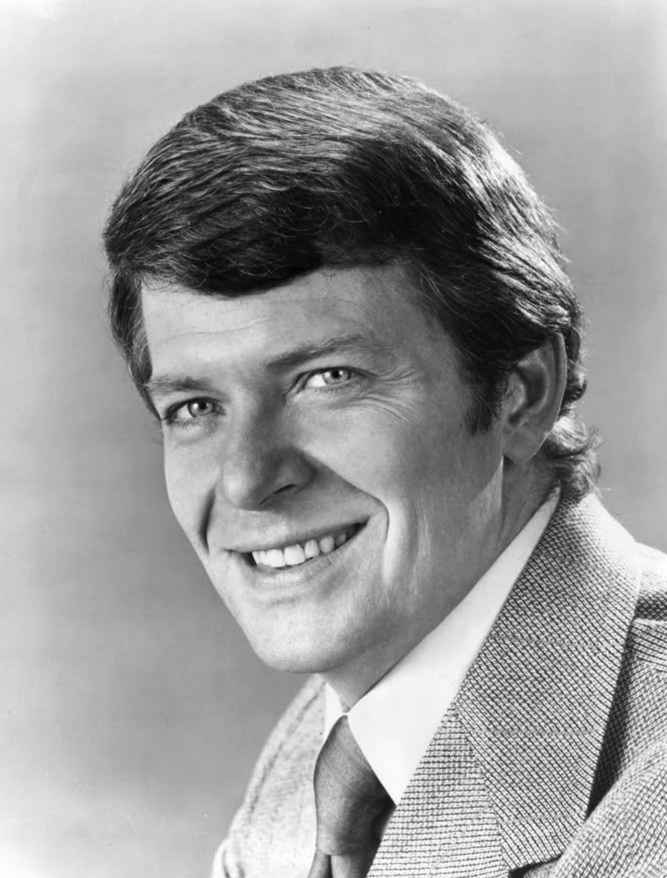
- Reed in 1971
- Born: John Robert Rietz Jr. October 19, 1932; Highland Park, Illinois, U.S.
- Died: May 12, 1992 (aged 59); Pasadena, California, U.S.
- Resting place: Memorial Park Cemetery, Skokie, Illinois, U.S.
- Education: Northwestern University; Royal Academy of Dramatic Art
- Occupations: Actor; director; musician
- Years active: 1957–1992
- Known for: The Defenders; The Brady Bunch; Rich Man, Poor Man; Roots; A Very Brady Christmas; The Bradys
- Spouse: Marilyn Rosenberger (m. 1954; div. 1959)
- Children: 1

Robert Reed (born John Robert Rietz Jr.; October 19, 1932 – May 12, 1992) was an American actor. He played Kenneth Preston on the legal drama The Defenders from 1961 to 1965 alongside E. G. Marshall, and is best known for his role as patriarch Mike Brady, opposite Florence Henderson's role as Carol Brady, on the ABC sitcom The Brady Bunch, which aired from 1969 to 1974. He later reprised his role of Mike Brady on several of the reunion programs. In 1976, he earned two Primetime Emmy Award nominations for his guest-starring role in a two-part episode of Medical Center and for his work on the miniseries Rich Man, Poor Man. The following year, Reed earned a third Emmy nomination for his role in the miniseries Roots.

== Early life ==
Reed was born John Robert Rietz Jr. in the northern Chicago suburb of Highland Park, Illinois, the only child of Helen (née Teaverbaugh) and John Robert Rietz, who were high-school sweethearts and married at 18. Reed attended the West Division School in Community Consolidated School District 62 until 1939. His father worked for the government, and his mother was a homemaker. Reed spent his early childhood years in Navasota, Texas and Shawnee, Oklahoma, attending Woodrow Wilson Grade School before the family moved to Muskogee, Oklahoma. In Oklahoma, his father, John Sr., worked as a turkey/cattle farmer.

In his youth, Reed joined the 4-H agricultural club and showed calves, but was more interested in acting and music. While attending Central High School in Muskogee, he participated in both activities. Reed also took to the stage, where he performed and sang. He also worked as a radio announcer at local radio stations and wrote and produced radio dramas. Reed graduated from Muskogee Central in 1950, and enrolled at Northwestern University to study drama. During his years at Northwestern, Reed appeared in several plays under the direction of Alvina Krause, a celebrated Northwestern drama coach. Reed performed in more than eight plays in college, all with leading roles.

He later studied for one term at the Royal Academy of Dramatic Art in London. Upon returning to the United States, Reed appeared in summer stock in Eagles Mere, Pennsylvania. He later joined the off-Broadway theatre group "The Shakespearewrights", and played Romeo in Romeo and Juliet and had a lead role in A Midsummer Night's Dream. After leaving the Shakespearewrights, Reed joined the Studebaker Theatre company in Chicago. He eventually adopted the stage name Robert Reed and moved to Los Angeles in the late 1950s to further pursue his acting career.

== Career ==
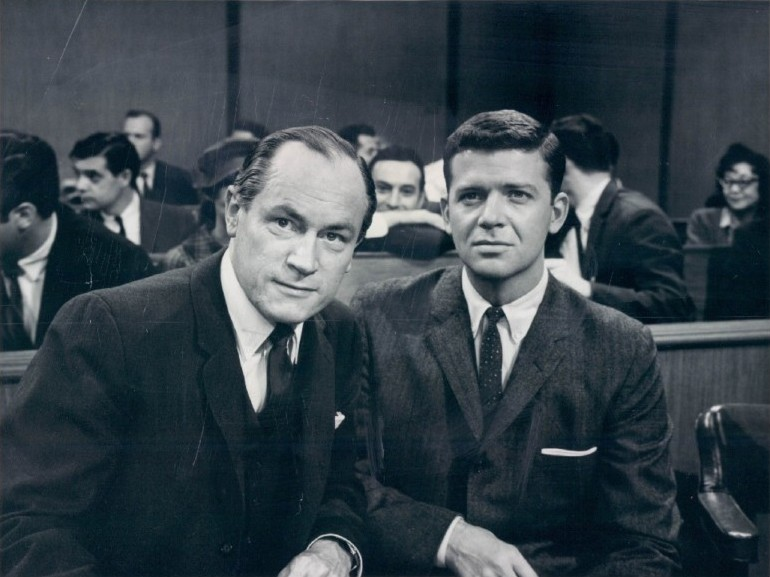
Reed and E.G. Marshall in a publicity shot for The Defenders, 1961

Reed made his first guest-starring appearance in an episode of Father Knows Best in 1959. This led to guest roles on Men into Space and Lawman, as well as his first credited film appearance in Bloodlust! In 1961, Reed landed his first television starring role in The Defenders alongside fellow Studebaker Theater performer E.G. Marshall, with the two playing a father-and-son team of defense attorneys. Marshall was also one of the founding members of the Actors Studio in New York; around this time, Reed himself became a member of the Studio, and remained a member for the next 30 years. The Defenders was a hit with audiences and earned a total of 22 Primetime Emmy Award nominations (E.G. Marshall won two Emmys for his performance while the show won twice for Outstanding Drama Series). Ratings for the series were high during its first three seasons, but fell when CBS moved the series from Saturday nights to Thursday nights. CBS canceled The Defenders in 1965.

While appearing on The Defenders in 1964, Reed made his Broadway stage debut as Paul Bratter in Neil Simon's Barefoot in the Park, replacing Robert Redford. For the remainder of the decade, Reed appeared primarily in television guest spots, including roles in Family Affair, Ironside, The Mod Squad, and Bob Hope Presents The Chrysler Theatre. He also appeared in the 1968 film Star! and in the Broadway production of Avanti!

=== The Brady Bunch ===
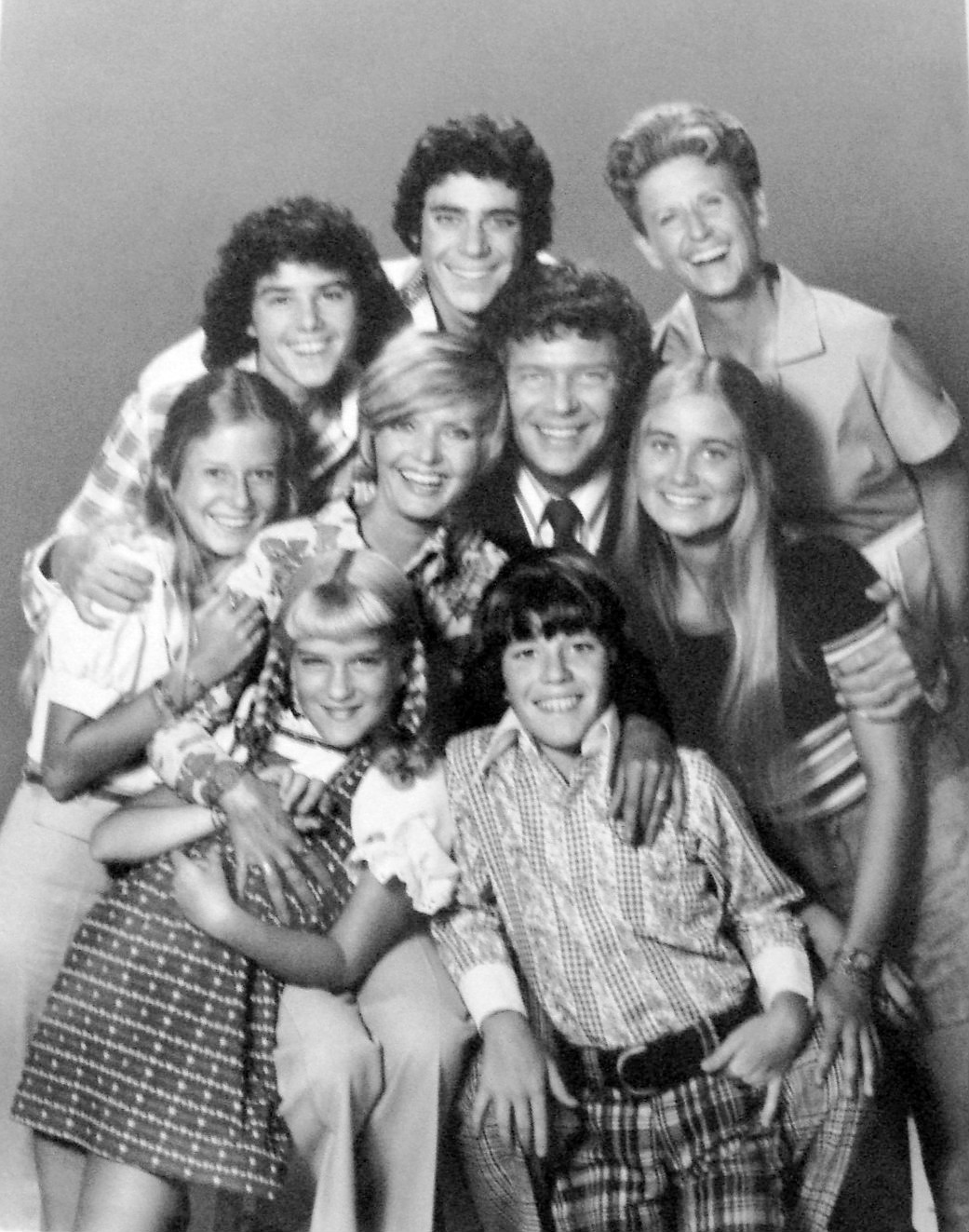
Cast photo of The Brady Bunch. Back (L-R): Christopher Knight (Peter), Barry Williams (Greg), Ann B. Davis (Alice). Second row (L-R): Eve Plumb (Jan), Florence Henderson (Carol), Robert Reed (Mike), Maureen McCormick (Marcia). Front (L-R): Susan Olsen (Cindy), Mike Lookinland (Bobby).

Appearing in Barefoot in the Park led to two new contracts at Paramount Pictures and ABC, both in 1968. When Paramount had decided to turn the television version of Barefoot in the Park into a predominantly African-American show, they planned for Reed to star in something else. The new series was entitled The Brady Bunch and featured a widowed man with three boys marrying an either widowed or divorced (not specified) woman, with three girls. The series' creator, Sherwood Schwartz, said he was inspired to create the series after reading a news item in the Los Angeles Times stating that "more than 29 percent of all marriages included a child or children from a previous marriage." Schwartz thought the idea was "... the key to a new and unusual TV series. It was a revelation! The first blended family! His kids and her kids! Together!"

Reed was the producers' second choice for the role of Mike Brady after Gene Hackman was rejected because he was largely unknown at the time. Also starring on The Brady Bunch was actress Florence Henderson, who played the role of Mike's wife Carol Brady after Shirley Jones turned down the role in favor of The Partridge Family. Also cast on the series was Ann B. Davis as the Bradys' maid, Alice Nelson. Despite earning poor reviews from critics and never cracking the Top 30 during its five-season run, The Brady Bunch remained an audience favorite of the 1970s. Since its cancellation in 1974, the series had a healthy afterlife in syndication and spawned several spin-off series and two television reunion films, along with two parody films.

From the very beginning of the sitcom's debut in September 1969, Reed was unhappy with his role as Mike Brady. He felt that acting in the often silly program was beneath his training as a serious Shakespearean actor. Producers and directors found Reed difficult to work with both on and off the set. However, all of the cast got along well with him. In his efforts to bring more realism to the sitcom, Reed often locked horns with the program's creator and executive producer Schwartz. Reed regularly presented Schwartz with hand-written memoranda detailing why a certain motivation did not make sense or why it was wrong to combine elements of farce and satire. Schwartz generally ignored Reed's suggestions, although in an attempt to alleviate tension, Schwartz occasionally allowed Reed to direct some episodes. In a 1983 interview, Reed admitted that he often butted heads with Schwartz, stating, "We fought over the scripts. Always over the scripts. The producer, Sherwood Schwartz, had done Gilligan's Island...Just gag lines. That would have been what The Brady Bunch would have been if I hadn't protested."

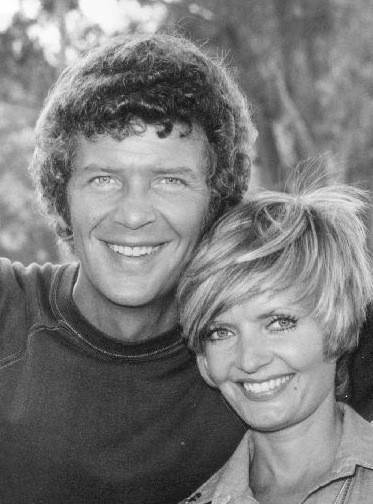
Reed and Florence Henderson in a publicity shot for The Brady Bunch, 1973

Reed was particularly appalled by what would turn out to be the show's final episode "The Hair-Brained Scheme." He sent Schwartz a memo, picking apart his problems with the episode, but Schwartz did not receive the memo promptly enough to alter the script as Reed wanted. As a result, Reed refused to appear in the episode altogether. By this time, Schwartz was tired of Reed's antagonistic behavior and decided to replace him for the show's sixth season; however, the series was cancelled by ABC shortly thereafter. Reed later claimed that he originally accepted the role for financial reasons, but tried to remain positive despite his creative differences with Schwartz by reminding himself the series was primarily about the children. Reed masked his dissatisfaction in front of the camera, always performing professionally without any indication of his unhappiness. Despite his discontentment with the show, Reed genuinely liked all of his co-stars and was a father figure to the younger cast members. Co-star Susan Olsen became friends with Reed's daughter Karen, who made a guest appearance in the episode "The Slumber Caper." Reed's final appearance in the series was in the penultimate episode "The Hustler." His final line in that episode was "Now I can get my car in the garage."

During the run of The Brady Bunch, Reed also had a recurring role as Lieutenant Adam Tobias on Mannix, from 1969 to 1975, and typically appeared in three to five Mannix episodes each season. He also directed several episodes of The Brady Bunch during its run. After Reed's agents overbooked him for a film in England with Anglia Television, his cancellation led to the 1972 court case of Anglia Television Ltd v Reed.

=== Later career ===
After The Brady Bunch series ended in 1974, Reed acted on stage and made guest star appearances on other television series and television movies, including Pray for the Wildcats and SST: Death Flight. He won critical acclaim for his portrayal of Pat Caddison, a doctor who comes out as transgender, in a two-part episode of Medical Center in 1975. The episode also earned him a Primetime Emmy Award nomination. Also that year he appeared in the TV-movie The Secret Night Caller, as a respectably married man with a compulsion to make obscene phone calls to women he barely knows. Reed appeared in the television film The Boy in the Plastic Bubble (1976), the miniseries Rich Man, Poor Man (1976), and the miniseries Roots (1977). Reed was again nominated for an Emmy Award for his work in Rich Man, Poor Man and Roots. He also guest-starred on Wonder Woman, Hawaii Five-O, Charlie's Angels, Galactica 1980, and Vega$.

In 1981, Reed won the lead role of Dr. Adam Rose on the medical drama Nurse. Despite critical acclaim, the series was canceled the following year. In 1986, he played the role of Lloyd Kendall on the daytime soap opera Search for Tomorrow. He also made multiple appearances on Fantasy Island, Hunter, The Love Boat and Murder, She Wrote.

Despite his dislike of The Brady Bunch and the character of Mike Brady, Reed continued to appear in Brady Bunch spinoffs and sequels for the remainder of his career. In 1976, Reed reprised the role of Mike Brady in the variety show The Brady Bunch Hour, a role he openly embraced because it afforded him the opportunity to sing and dance. He would later appear in the television film The Brady Girls Get Married (1981) and the television film A Very Brady Christmas (1988). In 1989, he guest-starred as Mike Brady in "A Very Brady Episode" of the NBC sitcom Day by Day. Also in 1989, Reed reteamed with his Brady Bunch co-star Henderson in a guest-starring role on the sitcom Free Spirit. In 1990, he reprised the role of Mike Brady for the final time in the drama series The Bradys. Reed clashed once again with producer Sherwood Schwartz over the show's writing, which Reed found substandard. Perhaps as a consequence, an unproduced script had Mike Brady die in a helicopter accident, but The Bradys was canceled after six episodes, well before the episode could be produced. Reed made his last onscreen appearance in an April 1992 episode of Jake and the Fatman, "Ain't Misbehavin'".

Shortly before his death, Reed appeared in the touring production of Love Letters, opposite Betsy Palmer, and taught classes on Shakespeare at UCLA.

== Personal life ==
Reed and fellow Northwestern student Marilyn Rosenberger married in July 1954. They had a daughter, Karen Rietz, before divorcing in 1959. Karen, who was born on October 1, 1956, had a guest role in The Brady Bunch as Carolyn Reed and died on November 29, 2025, in Northbrook, Illinois.

Reed kept the fact he was gay a close secret, since public knowledge of his true sexual orientation during that era would probably have damaged his career. Several years after his death, Reed's Brady Bunch co-stars – notably Barry Williams and Florence Henderson – publicly acknowledged Reed's sexual orientation, and revealed the entire cast and crew of The Brady Bunch were aware.

Henderson spoke of Reed being in the closet during a 2000 interview with ABC News: "Here he was, the perfect father of this wonderful little family, a perfect husband. Off camera, he was an unhappy person – I think had Bob not been forced to live this double life, I think it would have dissipated a lot of that anger and frustration. I never asked him. I never challenged him. I had a lot of compassion for him because I knew how he was suffering with keeping this secret." Regarding Reed's unwillingness to discuss his sexuality, even off-camera and in private, Williams told ABC News during an interview in 2000 that "Robert didn't want to go there. I don't think he talked about it with anyone. I just don't think it was open for discussion–period. Had it ever come out that Robert Reed was gay, it probably would have caused the demise of the show. I think it would have hurt his career tremendously."

In 1968, he was involved in a legal dispute with Anglia Television relating to his decision to withdraw from the production of an onscreen play. He lost the dispute and the case became a leading authority for damages in English Law.

== Death ==
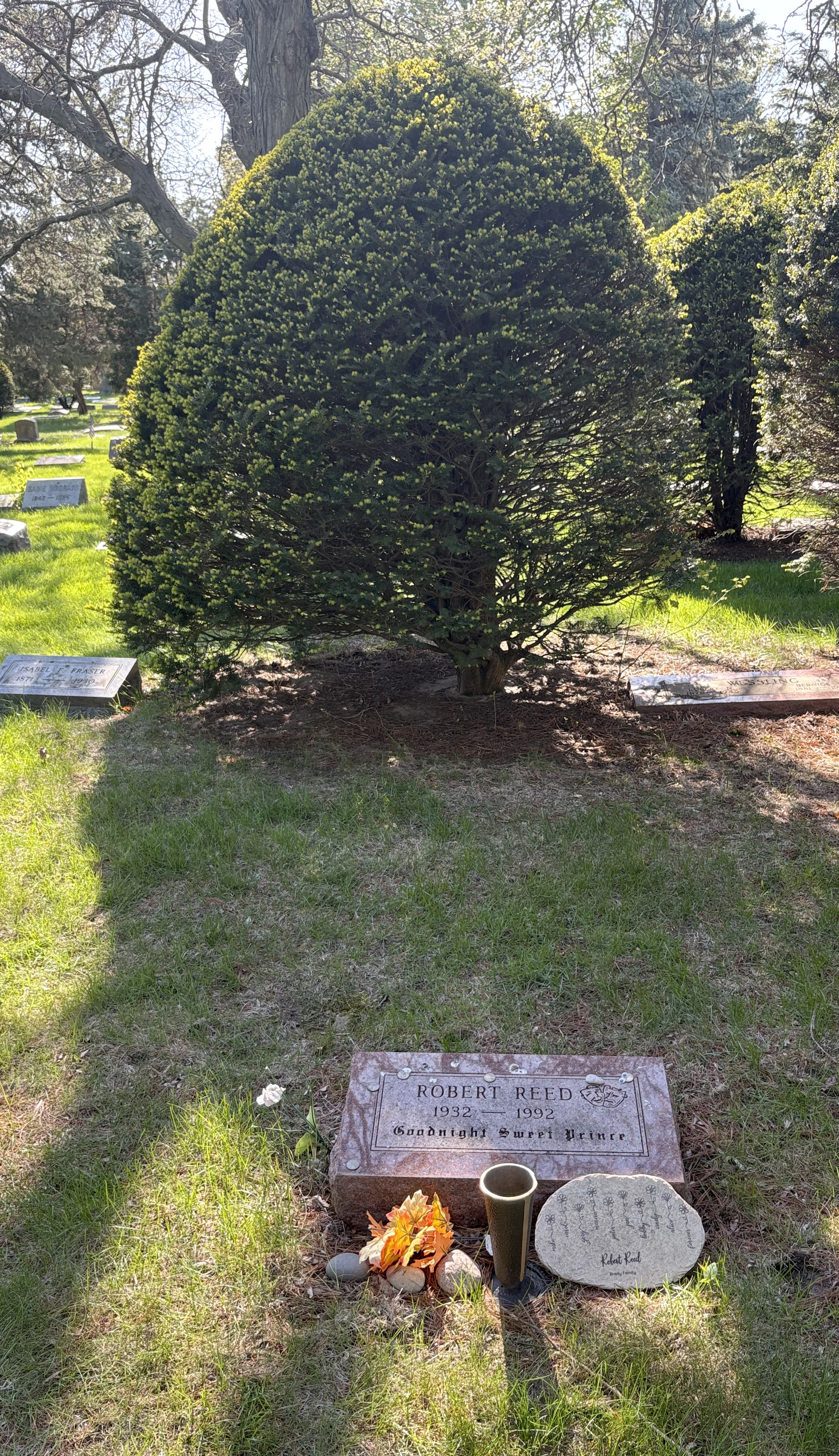
Reed's grave at Memorial Park Cemetery

In November 1991, Reed was diagnosed with colon lymphoma, a rare form of colorectal cancer. When he became ill, he only allowed his daughter Karen and actress Anne Haney, a close friend, to visit him. Haney later said of Reed, "He came from the old school, where people had a sense of decorum. He went the way he wanted to, without publicity." Weeks before his death, Reed called Henderson and asked her to inform the rest of The Brady Bunch cast that he was terminally ill. He died on May 12, 1992, at Huntington Memorial Hospital in Pasadena, California, at age 59.

Initially, Reed's death was solely attributed to cancer, but details that were written on his death certificate were later made public, revealing that Reed was also HIV-positive. The actor had been diagnosed with HIV in the spring of 1991. It remains unknown when Reed contracted HIV, because he kept his medical condition and private life a secret from the public until his death, telling only a few close friends. While Reed did not have AIDS at the time of his death, his doctor listed his HIV-positive status as one of the "significant conditions that contributed to death" on the death certificate. He is buried in the Memorial Park Cemetery in Skokie, Illinois.

== Filmography ==
=== Film ===
Year	Title	Role	Notes
1957	Pal Joey	Boy Friend	Uncredited
1958	The Hunters	Jackson	Uncredited
1958	Torpedo Run	Woolsey	Uncredited
1961	Bloodlust!	Johnny Randall	
1967	Hurry Sundown	Lars Finchley	
1968	Star!	Charles Fraser	
1968	Journey into Darkness	Hank Prentiss	(Segment: "The New People")
1969	The Maltese Bippy	Lt. Tim Crane	
1991	Prime Target	Agent Harrington	

=== Television ===
Year	Title	Role	Notes
1959	Make Room for Daddy	Airline Pilot	Episode: "Terry Comes Home"
1959	The Californians	Ed Carpenter	Episode: "Bella Union" As Robert Rietz
1959	Father Knows Best	Tom Cameron	Episode: "The Impostor"
1960	Men into Space	Russell Smith	Episode: "Earthbound"
1960	Bronco	Tom Fuller	Episode: "Volunteers from Aberdeen"
1960	Lawman	Jim Malone	Episode: "Left Hand of the Law"
1961	Tallahassee 7000		Episode: "Hostage"
1961–1965	The Defenders	Kenneth Preston	132 episodes
1965	Dr. Kildare	Judd Morrison	6 episodes
1965	Bob Hope Presents the Chrysler Theatre	Lt. Chris Callahan	Episode: "The Admiral"
1966	Preview Tonight	Lieutenant John Leahy	Episode: "Somewhere in Italy... Company B!"
1966	Operation Razzle-Dazzle	Lieutenant John Leahy	Television film
1966	Family Affair	Julian Hill	Episode: "Think Deep"
1966	My Husband Tom...and John	John	Unaired preview film for Paramount
1967	Li'l Abner	Senator Cod	Unsold pilot
1967	Hondo	Frank Davis	Episode: "Hondo and the Superstition Massacre"
1967	Ironside	Jerry Pearson	Episode: "Light at the End of the Journey"
1968	Journey to the Unknown	Hank Prentiss	Episode: "The New People"
1968–1975	Mannix	Lt. Adam Tobias	22 episodes
1969–1971	Love, American Style	Various roles	4 episodes
1969–1974	The Brady Bunch	Mike Brady	Main role
1971	The City	Sealy Graham	Television film
1972	Assignment: Munich	Doug "Mitch" Mitchell	Television film
1972	The Mod Squad	Jerry Silver	Episode: "The Connection"
1972	Haunts of the Very Rich	Reverend John Fellows	ABC Movie of the Week
1972	Mission: Impossible	Assistant D.A. Arthur Reynolds	Episode: "Hit"
1973	Snatched	Frank McCloy	ABC Movie of the Week
1973	Owen Marshall, Counselor at Law	Harker	Episode: "They've Got to Blame Somebody"
1973	Intertect	Blake Hollister	Television film
1973	The Man Who Could Talk to Kids	Tom Lassiter	Television film
1973	The World of Sid & Marty Krofft at the Hollywood Bowl	Audience member	Television special (Uncredited)
1974	Pray for the Wildcats	Paul McIlvain	ABC Movie of the Week
1974	Chase	Dr. Playter	Episode: "Remote Control"
1974	Harry O	Paul Virdon	Episode: "Accounts Balanced"
1975	The Secret Night Caller	Freddy Durant	Television film
1975	Medical Center	Dr. Pat Caddison	Episode: "The Fourth Sex" (Parts 1 & 2)
1975	McCloud	Jason Carter	Episode: "Fire!"
1976	The Streets of San Francisco	Dr. Arnold Stephen Holtfield	Episode: "The Honorable Profession"
1976	Jigsaw John	Alan Bellamy	Episode: "Promise to Kill"
1976	Wonder Woman	Fallon, the "Falcon"	Episode: "The Pluto File"
1976	Rich Man, Poor Man	Teddy Boylan	Miniseries
1976	Law and Order	Aaron Levine	Television film
1976	Lanigan's Rabbi	Morton Galen	Episode: "Pilot"
1976	Nightmare in Badham County	Supt. Dancer	Television film
1976	The Boy in the Plastic Bubble	Johnny Lubitch	Television film
1976	Revenge for a Rape	Sheriff Paley	Television film
1976–1977	The Brady Bunch Hour	Mike Brady	9 episodes
1977	Roots	Dr. William Reynolds	Miniseries
1977	The Wonderful World of Disney	Captain John C. Frémont	Episode: "Kit Carson and the Mountain Men" (Parts 1 & 2)
1977	The Love Boat II	Stephen Palmer	Television film
1977	SST: Death Flight	Captain Jim Walsh	Television film
1977	Barnaby Jones	DeWitt Robinson	Episode: "Death Beat"
1977	The Hunted Lady	Dr. Arthur Sills	Television film
1977–1986	The Love Boat	Various roles	6 episodes
1978	The Runaways	David McKay	4 episodes
1978	Thou Shalt Not Commit Adultery	Jack Kimball	Television film
1978	Bud and Lou	Alan Randall	Television film
1978–1979	Vega$	Various roles	2 episodes
1978–1983	Fantasy Island	Leo Drake	2 episodes
1979	Mandrake	Arkadian	Television film
1979	The Paper Chase	Professor Howard	Episode: "Once More with Feeling"
1979	Love's Savage Fury	Commander Marston	Television film
1979	Hawaii Five-O	Various roles	2 episodes
1979	The Seekers	Daniel Clapper	Miniseries
1979	Password Plus	Himself	Game Show Participant / Celebrity Guest Star
1979	Make Me Laugh	Himself	Game Show Contestant / Celebrity Guest Star
1980	Galactica 1980	Dr. Donald Mortinson	3 episodes
1980	Scruples	Josh Hillman	Miniseries
1980	Nurse	Dr. Kenneth Rose	Television film
1980	Charlie's Angels	Glenn Staley	2 episodes
1980	Casino	Darius	Television film
1981	The Brady Girls Get Married	Mike Brady	Television film
1981	Death of a Centerfold: The Dorothy Stratten Story	David Palmer	Television film
1981–1982	Nurse	Dr. Adam Rose	25 episodes
1982	ABC Afterschool Special	Henry Forbes	Episode: "Between Two Loves"
1983–1986	Hotel	Various roles	3 episodes
1984	The Mississippi	Tyler Marshall	Episode: "Abigail"
1984	Matt Houston	Bradley Denholm	Episode: "Stolen"
1984	Cover Up	Martin Dunbar	Episode: "A Subtle Seduction"
1985	Finder of Lost Loves	Tim Sanderson	Episode: "From the Heart"
1985	International Airport	Carl Roberts	Television film
1985	Glitter		Episode: "Suddenly Innocent"
1985–1990	Murder, She Wrote	Various roles	3 episodes
1986	Crazy Like a Fox	Hoffer	Episode: "Just Another Fox in the Crowd"
1986	Search for Tomorrow	Lloyd Kendall	Multiple episodes
1987	Hunter	Judge Warren Unger	3 episodes
1987	Duet	Jim Phillips	2 episodes
1987–1992	Jake and the Fatman	Various roles	2 episodes, (final appearance)
1988	The Law & Harry McGraw	Henry Carrington	Episode: "Beware the Ides of May"
1988	A Very Brady Christmas	Mike Brady	Television film
1989	Day by Day	Mike Brady	Episode: "A Very Brady Episode"
1989	Free Spirit	Albert Stillman	Episode: "The New Secretary"
1989	Snoops	Doug Mitchell	Episode: "Tango, Dance of Death"
1990	The Bradys	Mike Brady	Main role

== Award nominations ==
Year	Award	Category	Title of work
1976	Primetime Emmy Award	Outstanding Lead Actor for a Single Appearance in a Drama or Comedy Series	Medical Center (For episode "The Fourth Sex: Parts 1&2")
1976	Primetime Emmy Award	Outstanding Continuing Performance by a Supporting Actor in a Drama Series	Rich Man, Poor Man
1977	Primetime Emmy Award	Outstanding Single Performance by a Supporting Actor in a Comedy or Drama Series	Roots (For part V)
