= Geri Reischl =

American actress and singer

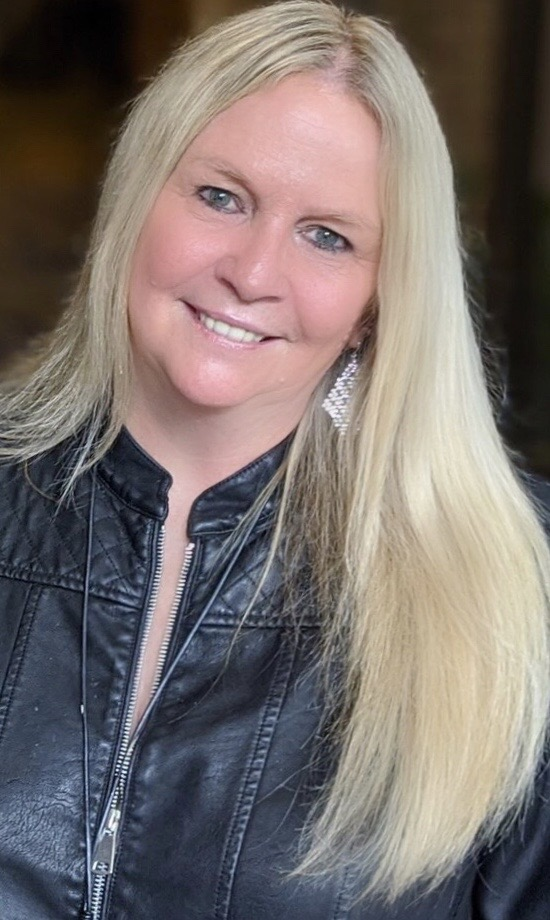
- Reischl in 2019

Background information
- Born: Bellflower, California, U.S.
- Genres: Pop, country, adult contemporary
- Occupations: Singer, songwriter, actor
- Instrument: Vocals
- Years active: 1966–1983, 2000–present
- Website: www.gerireischl.com

Geri Reischl is an American actress and singer. She was a child actress in the 1970s, most notably as Jan Brady on the variety show The Brady Bunch Hour, and appeared in various television commercials.

== Early life ==
Reischl was adopted when she was three days old. She recalled that her mother told her she was adopted when she was four or five years old because she did not want her to develop the idea that there was something wrong with being adopted.

== Acting career ==
Reischl's first appearance was at the age of six playing Gretl in a production of The Sound of Music, starring Patrice Munsel, at the Melodyland Theatre in Anaheim, California. There, she was discovered by a talent agent who signed her and got her parts in two commercials. She was then signed to an exclusive contract with Mattel Toys until she was retired in 1971 by the company at the age of 11. Her last Mattel commercial was for Mattel's Rock Flowers series of fashion dolls, and according to Reischl the series' 'Heather' doll was patterned after her likeness.

During her career, Geri appeared in over 40 commercials. From 1979 to 1983, she appeared in a series of Wizard of Oz-themed commercials for the breakfast cereal Crispy Wheats-n-Raisins, in which she played Dorothy. On television, Reischl appeared on Gunsmoke, The Interns, Apple's Way and The Bold Ones. In addition, Geri filmed a television pilot with Rene Simard entitled Rene and the Proteens. She also starred in two low-budget horror films: The Brotherhood of Satan (1971) and I Dismember Mama (1974).

=== The Brady Bunch Hour ===
Reischl is best known for portraying Jan Brady in nine episodes of The Brady Bunch Hour during the 1976–77 television season. Her appearances as Jan have been referred to as 'Fake Jan', a term which Reischl has since embraced as a "badge of honor" and her personal brand. She was selected from over 1,500 girls, including Kathy Richards, who auditioned for the role in 1976 and supposedly came in second place for the part. Reischl had not watched the original The Brady Bunch show at the time, since she was too busy with schoolwork, playing and singing with her band, and acting in television commercials and movies to watch much television. The rest of the cast immediately welcomed her and made her feel at ease on the show.

After The Brady Bunch Hour, Reischl went back to high school and after graduating she held a job in a doctor's office while continuing to audition. Reischl was given the role of Blair Warner in the television pilot Garrett's Girls (later renamed The Facts of Life), but was forced to give it up due to her contract with General Mills.

== Music career ==
Reischl sang and played guitar in a California band Sand Dabs from 1974 to 1976. Later, she performed at U.S.O. clubs, Magic Mountain, Knotts Berry Farm, the Harrah's Club, and with Marty Robbins at the Palomino Club of North Hollywood. She was one of Sammy Davis Jr.'s "Kids" in his Lake Tahoe night club act, and also performed with Red Skelton.

In the summer of 1976, Reischl toured the United States and Montreal doing an act with Canadian singer René Simard. Because of her interest in country music she made a guest appearance on the show Pop! Goes the Country in 1977 that was filmed at the Grand Ole Opry.

Reischl released a re-recording of her Brady Bunch Hour performance of "Your Song" titled "Fake Jan Sings for Real" on September 25, 2011. A studio album, 1200 Riverside, was released later the same year on November 1. It was well-received critically.

== Personal life ==
Reischl married in 1979 and had two children. She and her husband divorced in 2010.

== Discography ==
- Your Song (single, 2011)
- 1200 Riverside (album, 2011)

== Filmography ==
Year	Name	Role	Other notes
1970	The Interns	Jane Doe	1 episode, "The Prisoners"
1971	Gunsmoke	Anne Burney	1 episode; "Captain Sligo"
1971	The Brotherhood of Satan	K.T.	
1971	The Bold Ones: The New Doctors	Lisa	1 episode; "Glass Cage"
1972	I Dismember Mama	Annie	
1974	Apple's Way	Jan Cooper	1 episode; "The Engagement"
1976–1977	The Brady Bunch Hour	Jan Brady	9 episodes
1977	The Mike Douglas Show	Herself	Episode dated 9 February 1977
1977	Donny & Marie	Herself	Episode 14, Season 2
1977	Pop! Goes the Country	Herself	Episode 18, Season 4
1979	Garrett's Girls	Blair Warner	unaired pilot
