= Pray for the Wildcats =

1974 television film

- Original network advertisement.
- Genre: Thriller
- Written by: Jack Turley
- Directed by: Robert Michael Lewis
- Starring: Andy Griffith; William Shatner; Robert Reed; Marjoe Gortner; Angie Dickinson; Janet Margolin; Lorraine Gary
- Music by: Fred Myrow
- Country of origin: United States
- Original language: English

Production
- Producer: Anthony Wilson
- Production locations: Tucson, Arizona; Old Tucson - 201 S. Kinney Road, Tucson, Arizona; Baja California, Mexico; Nogales, Arizona
- Cinematography: John M. Stephens (as John Morley Stephens)
- Editor: Les Green
- Running time: 93 minutes
- Production company: ABC Circle Films

Original release
- Network: ABC
- Release: January 23, 1974

Pray for the Wildcats is a 1974 American made-for-television thriller film about a psychopathic business executive chasing his workers on dirtbikes through the desert after he killed a young man. The film was directed by Robert Michael Lewis and starred William Shatner and Andy Griffith, Robert Reed, Marjoe Gortner, Angie Dickinson, and Lorraine Gary. It originally aired as an ABC Movie of the Week on January 23, 1974.

With the stars of four popular TV series cast against type, the film has since gained a cult following, especially due to Griffith's against-type performance as the sadistic villain, a drastic departure following his long run on The Andy Griffith Show. The film would lead Griffith to pursue more villainous roles over the next few years.

== Plot summary ==
Baja California's location

Sam Farragut (Andy Griffith) is a sociopathic business executive in Southern California who forces a team of advertising agency employees, Warren Summerfield, Paul McIlvain, and Terry Maxon to embark on a dangerous dirtbike trip to the Baja California desert in order to compete for his business.

Warren Summerfield (William Shatner) is a suicidal middle-aged ad executive who has been fired from the agency; the straightlaced Paul McIlvain (Robert Reed) is inattentive to his wife Nancy (Angie Dickinson); and brash art designer Terry Maxon (Marjoe Gortner) feels suddenly trapped after his girlfriend Krissie (Janet Margolin) announces she is pregnant. There are numerous long sequences of motorcycle riding on desert backroads.

Summerfield has been having an affair with Nancy. He has not told his own wife, Lila (Lorraine Gary), that he was fired and is simply serving out his tenure at the agency while looking for a new position. Lila is actually aware of the affair.

Farragut convinces the ad men to make the motorcycle journey on the pretext of looking for a location to shoot a commercial. In reality, Farragut is reckless and looking to involve the men in a spontaneous edgy adventure of his own manipulation. After they leave, Nancy suspects that Summerfield is planning to kill himself for the insurance money, but she cannot convince Lila to instigate a search.

The four men travel deeper into Mexico on isolated dirt roads. At one point Summerfield contemplates plunging off a cliff. After being humiliated by a young American couple in a Baja bar, Farragut tracks them down on the beach while accompanied by Maxon. He tries to offer the young man one hundred dollars in order to sleep with his girlfriend, claiming he is a "hippie with money." Although rebuffed, he persists and is soon fought by the young man.

Although the young man appears to be winning the fight, Farragut seizes an axe and destroys the radiator of the couple's car. After returning to the others, Farragut and Maxon don't inform them of the incident. They are later confronted by the Mexican police who tell them that the young man died trying to hike to safety and that the girl may die as well.

Overnight in the town, Summerfield discovers the truth and tries to convince Maxon and McIlvain to help him turn Farragut in to the police. Maxon, manipulated by Farragut's promise of a promotion in the company, refuses to even admit the truth about Sam's actions, while the conflicted McIlvain resists out of prudence. The next morning, Farragut and Maxon leave on their own for the airport to fly home. They are pursued by Summerfield, who catches up to them. Maxon returns to the town, while Summerfield confronts Farragut, and says he plans to turn Sam into the authorities. Sam, in turn, reveals he knows about Summerfield's firing, life insurance policy, and his plans to commit suicide. When he is unable to either shame or manipulate Summerfield into changing his mind, Farragut pursues Summerfield across the desert in a motorcycle chase, intending to kill him. As Farragut chases Summerfield along a high cliff, Summerfield ditches his bike while Farragut loses control and plunges over the cliff to his fiery death.

The three ad men return to the U.S. with Farragut's remains. Nancy informs McIlvain she wants a divorce. Krissie tells Maxon she is no longer pregnant, implying she has had an abortion. Summerfield, with a new lease on life, is greeted warmly by Lila.

McIlavin, knowing the truth about Summerfield's firing, offers to help him get his job back, but Summerfield refuses. Recognizing McIlavin's compliance and cowardice, Summerfield lets McIlvain know that no matter how different things may be in the future, men like them are always going to have to deal with, as Summerfield puts it, the "Sam Farraguts of the world" and what they represent.

== Cast ==
- Andy Griffith as Sam Farragut
- William Shatner as Warren Summerfield
- Robert Reed as Paul McIlvain
- Marjoe Gortner as Terry Maxon
- Angie Dickinson as Nancy McIlvain
- Janet Margolin as Krissie Kincaid
- Lorraine Gary as Lila Summerfield
- John Barbour as Howard Norlan
- Robert Burton as Michael (as Skip Burton)
- Marilyn Hearn as Loris
- William Wintersole as Mr. Perrins
- Paul Kent as Dr. Harris
- John Brascia as Captain Guiterrez

== Production ==
It was mainly shot in the Baja California desert, although the Mexican town scenes were shot on location at Old Tucson.

== Home media ==
The film was released in 1987 on video by Republic Pictures Home Video. Its running time is 100 minutes.

The film was released on DVD as part of a set called "Movies for the Man Cave 4." It is also available on a four-movie compilation DVD called, "Andy Griffith Collection: America's Favorite Actor."
