= Anglia Television Ltd v Reed =

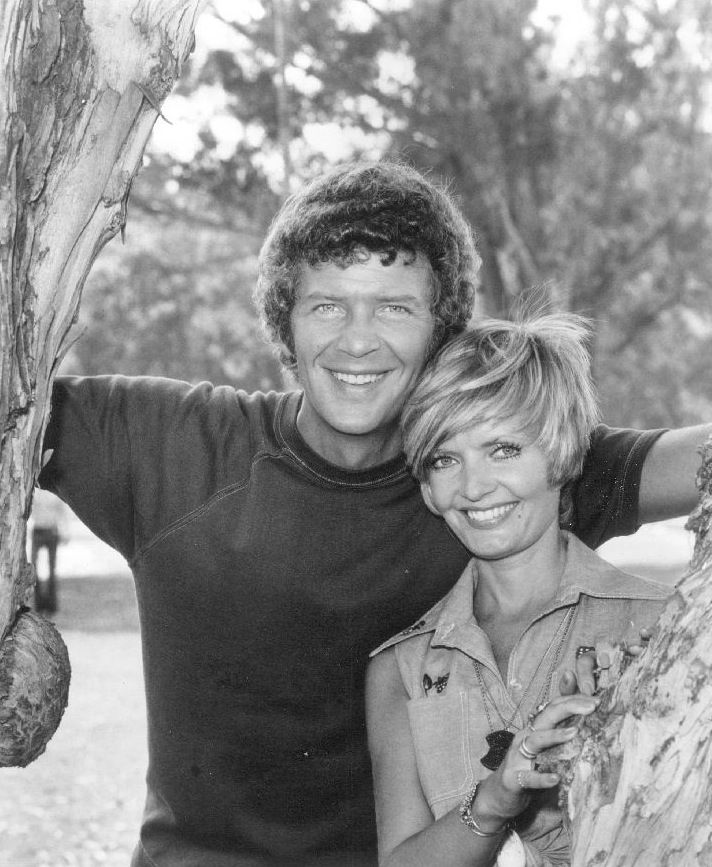
- Robert Reed, with Florence Henderson
- Court: Court of Appeal of England and Wales
- Citation: [1972] 1 QB 60

Keywords
- Contract, remedies

Anglia Television Ltd v Reed [1972] 1 QB 60 is an English contract law case, concerning the right to reliance damages for loss flowing from a breach of contract.

== Judgment ==
Lord Denning MR held that expenditure incurred before could be claimed, so long as it was within the contemplation of the parties. Here Reed would have known of considerable expense.

It is true that, if the defendant had never entered into the contract, he would not be liable, and the expenditure would have been incurred by the plaintiff without redress; but, the defendant having made his contract and broken it, it does not lie in his mouth to say he is not liable, when it was because of his breach that the expenditure has been wasted.

So not £854.65 awarded (after) but the full £2750 (before as well) for all the directors, designers, stage managers, and assistant managers' fees.
