= Christopher Knight (actor) =

American actor (b. 1957)

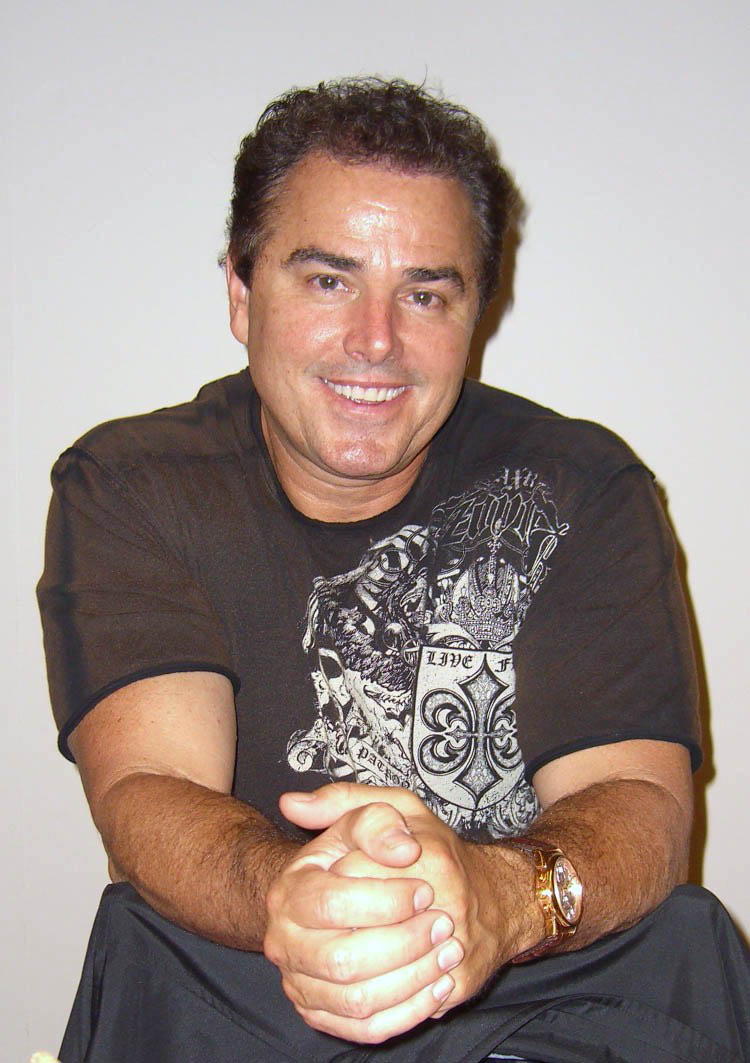
- Knight in 2010
- Born: Christopher Anton Knight; November 7, 1957 (age 68); New York City, U.S.
- Occupations: Actor; businessman
- Years active: 1967–present
- Known for: Peter Brady in The Brady Bunch; The Brady Kids; A Very Brady Christmas; The Bradys
- Spouses: Julie Schulman (m. 1989; div. 1992) Toni Erickson (m. 1995; div. 2000) Adrianne Curry (m. 2006; div. 2013) Cara Kokenes (m. 2016)

Christopher Anton Knight (born November 7, 1957) is an American actor and businessman. He is most notable for playing Peter Brady in the 1970s series The Brady Bunch. He has since gone on to become a businessman and enjoyed a semi-resurgence in the public eye with television appearances in the 2000s.

== Early life and work ==
Knight was born in New York City, New York, the son of Edward and Wilma Knight. Knight's father, an actor, was born Edward Kozumplik, to parents from the Austro-Hungarian Empire, while Knight's mother was Jewish.

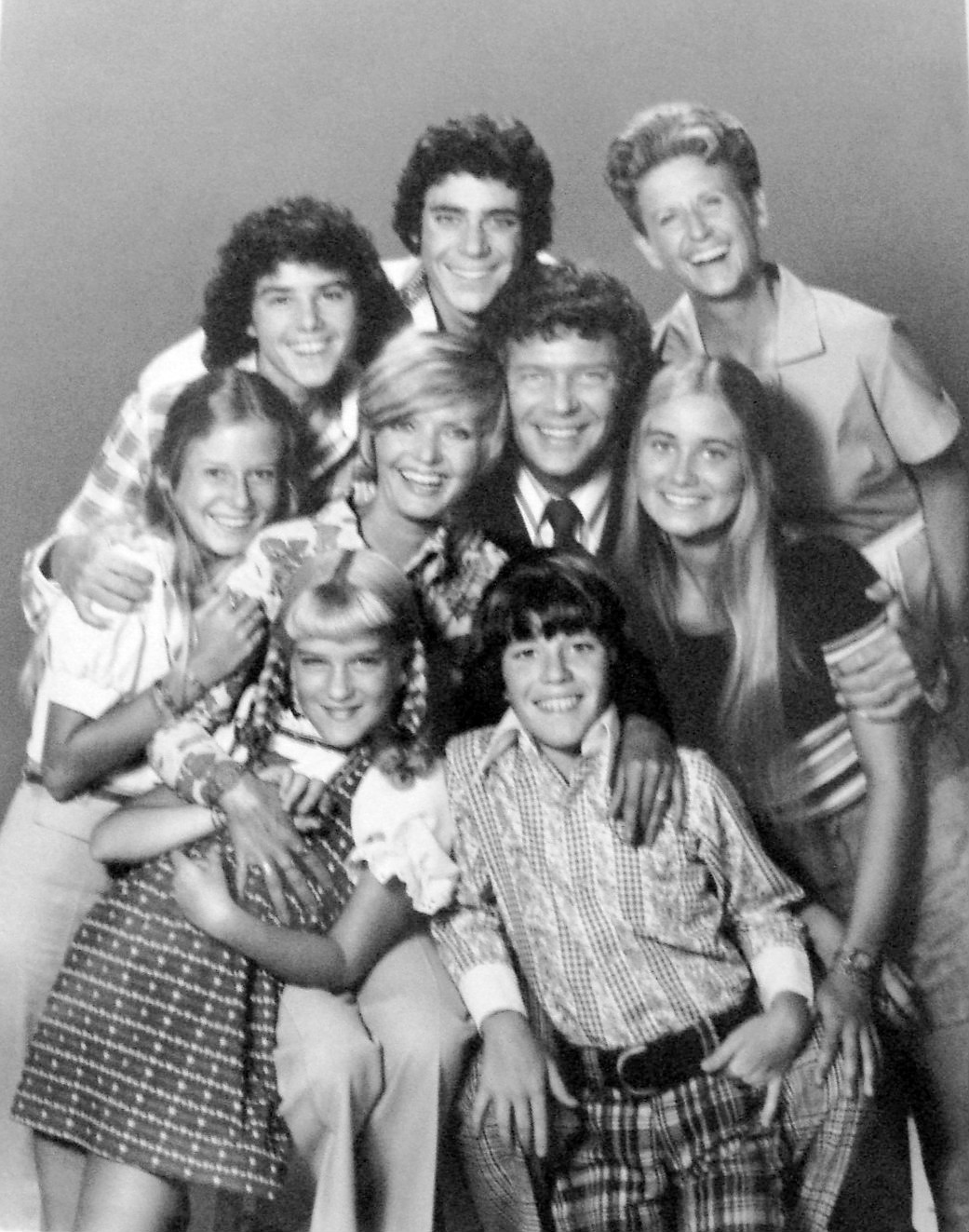
Cast photo of The Brady Bunch. Back (L-R): Christopher Knight (Peter), Barry Williams (Greg), Ann B. Davis (Alice). Second row (L-R): Eve Plumb (Jan), Florence Henderson (Carol), Robert Reed (Mike), Maureen McCormick (Marcia). Front (L-R): Susan Olsen (Cindy), Mike Lookinland (Bobby).

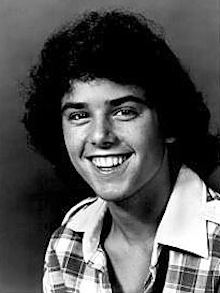
Knight as middle son Peter on The Brady Bunch in 1973

== Career ==
=== The Brady Bunch and other roles ===
Before the Brady Bunch series, Knight had some small television roles, including an appearance on the first season of Mannix, in a 1967 episode called "Coffin for a Clown". In 1969, Knight was cast as middle son Peter Brady on the ABC sitcom The Brady Bunch, which ran until 1974. He was also the voice of Peter in the ABC Saturday morning cartoon The Brady Kids (1972–74).

After the end of the Brady Bunch, Knight's acting career consisted mostly of making guest appearances on other television shows (Happy Days, The Love Boat), and occasional film roles (Just You and Me, Kid, Curfew, Good Girls Don't, The Doom Generation, and Nowhere). He reunited with his former Brady costars in several subsequent series, including The Brady Bunch Hour (1976–77), the TV movie The Brady Girls Get Married (1981), the holiday TV movie A Very Brady Christmas (1988), and the drama The Bradys (1990). He also had a cameo role as a coach in the film The Brady Bunch Movie (1995).

=== Computer career ===
In 1988, Knight, a self-described "geek", left acting for the information technology business. He was an account sales manager for Martec, Inc., and then Vice President of Design System Marketing and Sales at New Image Industry. In 1991, he co-founded Visual Software, and in 1995, he founded Kidwise Learningware. He subsequently worked for Adesso and iXMicro. In 1998, he founded his own TV tuner company, Eskape Labs; it was purchased by Hauppauge Computer Works in 2000.

=== Return to television ===
Continuing to pursue TV opportunities, Knight appeared on VH1's fourth season of The Surreal Life. The show garnered Knight more attention than he had received in quite some time. During his stint on the show, he began a romance with castmate model Adrianne Curry, winner of America's Next Top Model cycle 1. After the show, the two moved in together and got engaged, as documented on the VH1 series My Fair Brady, which premiered on September 11, 2005.

Knight participated in VH-1's retrospective miniseries I Love The '70s: Volume II. He, his family, and friends appeared on the season finale of NBC's Celebrity Family Feud on July 29, 2008. During the 2008–09 television season, Knight hosted the syndicated game show Trivial Pursuit: America Plays. Between 2009 and 2012, he hosted a series of Jonathan Goodson-produced game show specials for the Michigan Lottery, Make Me Rich. Knight joined the other Brady Bunch cast members in the 2019 television series A Very Brady Renovation on HGTV. In 2021, he starred in the Lifetime Christmas movie Blending Christmas, alongside his Brady Bunch co-stars Barry Williams, Mike Lookinland, Susan Olsen, and Robbie Rist.

In 2022, Knight, Williams, and Lookinland competed in season eight of The Masked Singer as "Mummies". They were eliminated in the third episode, which aired as the October 3 "TV Theme Night" alongside Daymond John as "Fortune Teller". On June 28, 2024, Knight appeared as a guest on Toon In With Me, which airs on MeTV.

=== Move into production ===
In 2019, Knight and Emmy-nominated producer Phil Viardo founded Former Prodigy Media, a production company based in Los Angeles. In 2023, the company released Truelove, an award winning documentary film about Callie Truelove, a teenager with Williams syndrome. Knight also appears in the film.

== Personal life ==
Knight has been married four times. Knight proposed to his third wife, model and reality television personality Adrianne Curry, on the season finale of My Fair Brady, on VH1, which aired on November 6, 2005. The show was renewed for a second season that began in June 2006, and focused on the couple's wedding preparations. The couple wed in Curry's hometown of Joliet, Illinois, on May 29, 2006, in a gothic-style wedding. Knight's manager, Phil Viardo, told a celebrity gossip website on May 29, 2011 that Knight and Curry were announcing their separation. The date was the couple's fifth wedding anniversary. On February 2, 2012, on G4's Attack of the Show, Curry said the divorce had been finalized. He married his fourth wife, Cara Kokenes, in November 2016.

== Filmography ==
=== Film ===
Year	Title	Role	Notes
1979	Just You and Me, Kid	Roy	
1989	Curfew	Sam	
1993	Good Girls Don't	Montana	
1995	The Brady Bunch Movie	Coach	
1997	Nowhere	Mr. Sighvatssohn	
2000	Family Jewels	The Guru	
2003	Dickie Roberts: Former Child Star	Christopher Knight	
2005	L.A. Dicks	Bernie Taylor	
2006	Fallen Angels	Belmont	
2008	Light Years Away	David Sommers	
2009	American Pie Presents: The Book of Love	Alumnus Guy #3	
2012	The Lords of Salem	Keith 'Lobster Joe' Williams	Scenes deleted
2012	Letting Go	The Boss	
2014	Guardian Angel	Brian Casey	
2017	Where the Fast Lane Ends	Cooley Swindell	
2017	Prisoner	Brad	Short
2023	Truelove: The Film	Himself	Documentary about Williams syndrome

=== Television ===
Year	Title	Role	Notes
1967	Mannix	Josh	"Coffin for a Clown" (credited as "Christopher A. Knight")
1968	Gunsmoke	Jimmy	"The Miracle Man"
1969–1974	The Brady Bunch	Peter Brady	Main role
1972	The ABC Saturday Superstar Movie	Peter Brady (voice)	"The Brady Kids on Mysterious Island"
1972–1974	The Brady Kids	Peter Brady (voice)	Main role (credited as "David E. Smith" in season 2)
1974	ABC Afterschool Special	Joe	"Sara's Summer of the Swans"
1976	One Day at a Time	Pete	"Barbara's Emergence"
1976–77	The Brady Bunch Hour	Peter Brady	Main role
1977	The Bionic Woman	Bobby	"Max"
1978	Happy Days	Binky Hodges	"Be My Valentine"
1978	CHiPs	Wes Miller	"Family Crisis"
1979	Diary of a Teenage Hitchhiker	Nick	TV film
1979–80	Joe's World	Steve Wabash	Main role
1980	Valentine Magic on Love Island	Jimmy	TV film
1980-1981	Another World	Leigh Hobson	Contract role
1981	The Brady Girls Get Married	Peter Brady	TV film
1984	Masquerade	Hank Totten	"Oil"
1984	The Love Boat	Peter Barkan	1 episode
1988	A Very Brady Christmas	Peter Brady	TV film
1989	Day by Day	Peter Brady	"A Very Brady Episode"
1990	The Bradys	Peter Brady	Main role
2001	The Weakest Link	Himself	"Brady Bunch Special Edition"
2006	That '70s Show	Josh	"We Will Rock You"
2008–2009	Trivial Pursuit: America Plays	Himself	Host
2010, 2018	The Bold and the Beautiful	Dr. Andrews	2 episodes
2014	Heartbreakers	Hurley Fontenot	Miniseries
2018	The Last Sharknado: It's About Time	Grandpa Clarke	TV film
2019	A Very Brady Renovation	Himself	7 episodes
2021	Dragging the Classics: The Brady Bunch	Peter Brady	Paramount+ special
2021	Blending Christmas	Brian	TV film
2022	The Masked Singer	Himself/Mummy	Season 8 contestant; Group costume with Barry Williams and Mike Lookinland
