= The Brady Bunch Hour =

American television series

- Also known as: The Brady Bunch Variety Hour
- Genre: Variety
- Created by: Sid and Marty Krofft
- Based on: The Brady Bunch by Sherwood Schwartz
- Written by: Carl Kleinschmitt; Ronny Graham; Terry Hart; Bruce Vilanch; Steve Bluestein; Mike Kagan
- Directed by: Art Fisher; Jack Regas
- Starring: Robert Reed; Florence Henderson; Ann B. Davis; Barry Williams; Maureen McCormick; Christopher Knight; Geri Reischl; Mike Lookinland; Susan Olsen; Rip Taylor
- Ending theme: "United We Stand" performed by the Bradys
- Composer: George Wyle
- Country of origin: United States
- No. of seasons: 1
- No. of episodes: 9

Production
- Executive producer: Sid and Marty Krofft
- Producers: Lee Miller; Jerry McPhie
- Production location: Golden West Videotape Division
- Camera setup: Multi-camera
- Running time: 60 minutes
- Production companies: Sid & Marty Krofft Productions; Paramount Television

Original release
- Network: ABC
- Release: November 28, 1976 – May 25, 1977

Related
- The Brady Kids; The Brady Girls Get Married

The Brady Bunch Hour is an American variety show featuring skits and songs produced by Sid & Marty Krofft Productions in association with Paramount Television. It ran on ABC from November 28, 1976, to May 25, 1977.

The series starred the original cast members of The Brady Bunch, with the exception of Eve Plumb, who was replaced by Geri Reischl (popularly called "Fake Jan"). The show began as a 60-minute special titled The Brady Bunch Variety Hour on November 28, 1976. The special garnered high ratings and led to eight additional 60-minute episodes which were produced and aired sporadically under the shortened title The Brady Bunch Hour from January 23 to May 25, 1977.

Later Brady Bunch revival series and TV reunion movies do not include or mention the show's events.

== Premise ==
When the family is chosen to star in a new variety series for ABC, Mike Brady gives up his architectural career and moves his family into a beachside home somewhere in Southern California. In addition to the Brady clan, next-door-neighbor Jack Merrill (Rip Taylor) frequently finds his way into the act and is a love interest for the Bradys' maid, Alice (her former boyfriend, Sam the Butcher, is never mentioned). Each episode features the obligatory variety show song-and-dance numbers and sketches, as well as a show-within-a-show behind-the-scenes story which takes place in the Bradys' home.

== Cast ==
- Robert Reed as Mike Brady
- Florence Henderson as Carol Brady
- Ann B. Davis as Alice Nelson
- Barry Williams as Greg Brady
- Maureen McCormick as Marcia Brady
- Christopher Knight as Peter Brady
- Geri Reischl as Jan Brady
- Mike Lookinland as Bobby Brady
- Susan Olsen as Cindy Brady
- Rip Taylor as Jack Merrill

The Krofftettes and Water Follies

- Charkie Phillips
- Christine Cullen Wallace
- Susan Buckner
- Linda Hoxit
- Judy Susman
- Lynne Latham
- Dee Kaye
- Robyn Blythe

== Background ==
=== Development ===
In 1976, ABC president Fred Silverman concocted the idea of reuniting the cast of The Brady Bunch on an episode of the Donny & Marie variety show. Florence Henderson, Maureen McCormick, Mike Lookinland, and Susan Olsen were booked and when the show aired on October 8, it was a ratings success, prompting Silverman to begin developing a variety show starring the Brady family. Donny & Marie producers Sid and Marty Krofft agreed to helm the show, as their paths had crossed with the Brady Bunch stars on numerous occasions, but no one bothered to seek the approval or involvement of Paramount Pictures (the producers and then-property holders of The Brady Bunch) or Sherwood Schwartz (the series creator). Both parties eventually gave their approval of the new series, mainly as a way to keep interest in the original series. The variety hour was the only Brady project to not have the involvement of Schwartz during production.

=== Casting ===
Although Robert Reed's dissatisfaction with other Brady Bunch incarnations is well-known, he quickly signed on to star in the variety show. Maureen McCormick recalled: "We joked that it was the first time any of us could remember him wanting to do something Brady-related." Barry Williams once wrote: "The Brady Bunch Hour was incredibly bad, but even more incredible was the fact that Robert Reed (who you'd expect would be foaming at the mouth about this mess) really enjoyed being on it." When Williams asked him why, Reed said: "I've studied voice and dancing. I'm terrible at both, and it proved to be true, but when Sid and Marty met with me, they described the whole thing in very positive terms and I thought, 'What fun! This'll be a hoot!'" Quipped McCormick, "He sang and danced without caring that he was lousy and the show itself was worse."

Florence Henderson, the only cast member with real experience singing and dancing, was leery of the project but also agreed to appear, so the producers then set their sights on reuniting the Brady kids. Barry Williams was working on Broadway when he got a call from Marty Krofft, who pitched the show as "The Barry Williams Variety Hour with The Brady Bunch", promising the young entertainer featured solos and elaborate dance routines. Maureen McCormick was excited at the prospect of singing and working with the Krofft brothers; and Susan Olsen loved the idea of doing Saturday Night Live-type skits. Christopher Knight had turned his back on the entertainment industry and was aware of his own singing/dancing limitations, but he agreed to do the show when he was promised that his work would be limited to the opening and closing numbers and comedy sketches. Knight later said that it did not work that way "and I learned one of life's lessons—always get it in writing!" Mike Lookinland was uncomfortable dancing and had no desire to do the show, so he demanded twice the salary he was offered in hopes that the producers would be forced to recast his role. To his surprise, this resulted in an increased salary for each cast member. Even then, he did not want to do the show and often skipped the rehearsals, until one day Florence Henderson found him in the parking lot and reminded him that they were all doing their job and "if his heart wasn't in it, neither should he be". Ann B. Davis had left Hollywood in 1974 and was working as a volunteer in a clergy house in Denver, Colorado when the series was hurried into production. Originally, no one thought to include Davis, but at the last minute the crew decided to offer her a guest-starring role, which she retained throughout all nine episodes of the series. The producers made a deal which allowed her to be on the set only a few days a week so she could commute to Denver and fulfill her responsibilities to the church.

Contrary to popular belief, Eve Plumb was originally slated to appear in the variety hour. She said in her interview from 1976: "I wanted to do the show but there was a built-in option for thirteen more shows and possibly five years". Plumb agreed to appear in five of the thirteen planned episodes, but when the network demanded that it was all-or-nothing, she backed out of the project. In late October 1976, producers scrambled to find a replacement and met with over 1500 hopefuls, eventually settling on Geri Reischl to fill the void. Reischl, who had extensive singing experience, auditioned several times and landed the role only one day before rehearsals began. Reischl's costars made her feel at home (Robert Reed told her it felt like she had always been a part of the Brady family, and she developed a lasting friendship with Susan Olsen), but because of the recasting, Reischl was later dubbed "Fake Jan", a moniker which she has openly embraced.

After the pilot was shot, producers decided that they needed a regular comedian on the show, so Rip Taylor was brought aboard to portray the Bradys' realtor, moving man, next-door-neighbor, general Jack-of-all-trades and Alice's boyfriend, Mr. Jack Merrill. Like Reischl, Taylor felt welcomed by the cast—with the exception of Ann B. Davis, who barely spoke to him except when they were doing scenes. Series writer Mike Kagan commented that Rip Taylor is a "salty guy, he's got a dirty sense of humor and Ann B. Davis is a born-again Christian."

=== Krofftettes ===
The Krofftettes were a dance troupe, who also performed water ballet created by Sid and Marty Krofft as a spin-off of The Ice Vanities, which performed skating routines on their other variety endeavor, Donny & Marie. When ABC programming executive Michael Eisner asked the Kroffts to create a new show for The Brady Bunch, Sid decided that the next best thing to ice would be a gigantic swimming pool, inspired by Esther Williams movies of the 1940s and 1950s. On October 25, 1976, the Kroffts held auditions for the group with choreographer Joe Cassini in the ABC headquarters at 1313 North Vine Street in Hollywood. There, they met Charkie Phillips, a classically trained dancer from Florida and competitive swimmer with an extensive background in synchronized swimming. Phillips was selected to help Cassini choose dancers who could also handle the rigors of synchronised swimming.

=== Production ===
The series was taped on Stage 2 at KTLA Studios in Los Angeles. The first episode was taped over three days beginning Monday, November 22, completing just days before its air date that Thanksgiving Sunday. The pool—45 by 25 feet (13.7 m × 7.6 m) and 68 inches (1.7 m) deep with a capacity of 47,756 US gallons (180,780 L)—arrived in sections that were bolted together and made watertight. The pool included windows along the sides of the tank to ease filming underwater. When the pool was first filled, early taping tests were unsuccessful. Assistant director Rick Locke commented that "it looked like milk". The pool was then filled with 50,000 US gallons (190,000 L) of Sparkletts bottled water, which was chlorinated along with filter and pump facilities added outside the studio.

Both the swimmers and stage crew faced many challenges with the swimming pool during production. Because the pool was located next door to the ice rink for Donny & Marie on Stage 1, the Krofftettes entered and exited the water in frigid air temperatures while rehearsing for the pilot episode. This caused steam to rise out of the water. Attempts to equalize the temperature of both the water and air then turned the pool into a warm bath.

Unlike traditional synchronized swimming, the Krofftettes were expected to sit on the bottom of the pool floor in various formations. In order to accomplish this, the women had to completely exhale all of their breath so that they would sink in a state of hypoxia. The ABC network would not allow the use of goggles and any unsightly air bubble escaping from a desperate nostril was absolutely forbidden. Because the Krofftettes had double duty as dancers on stage with the Bradys during the day, swimming sequences were often relegated to late night hours. This required the women to work more than 15 consecutive hours on days they were filming.

Other hazards with the swimming pool included props weighed to the bottom, which presented unwelcome obstructions. In addition, the Kroffts decided in one production number to have gas canisters in the pool, which they ignited during filming as a special effect. The Krofftettes were also forced to smear Vaseline into their scalp so that everything would stay in place while under water. This could only be removed with a recipe of Spic and Span household cleaner along with Joy dishwashing liquid, which turned everyone's hair green. Turbans and other head pieces were then used for the remainder of the series.

The Krofftettes were the first water ballet troupe to be recorded on video tape, which presented its own set of challenges. The Kroffts experimented with an underwater camera, but relied more on large porthole windows in which cameras taped from outside of the pool itself. Cast, crew, and visitors alike were known to visit the stage and observe the young women during rehearsals through these windows, which included Chevy Chase and Paul Shaffer who were working at the studio on a television special. According to Shaffer, Chase would cut production meetings short so that everyone could go watch the Krofftettes.

Apart from the first episode, the production crew were very resistant to the expense of doing multiple takes, even allowing bloopers to appear in the finished episodes rather than re-shooting the sequences.

=== Scheduling ===
The show was intended to air every fifth week in the same slot as The Hardy Boys/Nancy Drew Mysteries. Starting in November 1976, the series maintained this schedule for the first few episodes. By March, however, the series was briefly a weekly show, running for three weeks consecutively in March and April. It then returned to being scheduled sporadically for its final few episodes, leading to inconsistent ratings. A promo was often shown with Reed and Henderson stating, "The Brady Bunch Variety Hour won't be seen this week, but we will be back again soon."

== Episodes ==
Ep.	Airdate	Title	Director	Writers	Guest stars
1	November 28, 1976	The Brady Bunch Variety Hour	Art Fisher	Ronny Graham, Terry Hart, Bruce Vilanch, Steve Bluestein	Tony Randall, Donny Osmond, Marie Osmond, Patty Maloney
Plot: The Brady kids fear their father is not talented enough to appear on their variety show, so Bobby schemes to replace him with Tony Randall.
Musical numbers: 1. "Baby Face" / "Love to Love You Baby" (Robert Reed, Florence Henderson, Barry Williams, Maureen McCormick, Christopher Knight, Geri Reischl, Mike Lookinland and Susan Olsen); 2. "One" (Robert Reed, Florence Henderson, Barry Williams, Maureen McCormick, Christopher Knight, Geri Reischl, Mike Lookinland and Susan Olsen); 3. "Splish Splash" (Barry Williams, Maureen McCormick, Donny Osmond and Marie Osmond); 4. "There'll Be a Hot Time in the Old Town Tonight" (instrumental); 5. "Corner of the Sky" (Barry Williams); 6. "Facade" (Tony Randall); 7. "What I Did For Love" / "The Way We Were" (Florence Henderson); 8. Dance Medley: 1. "Attitude Dancing" (Barry Williams); 2. "Cheek to Cheek" (Robert Reed and Florence Henderson); 3. "Dance with Me" (Robert Reed, Florence Henderson, Barry Williams, Maureen McCormick, Christopher Knight, Geri Reischl, Mike Lookinland and Susan Olsen); 4. "I Could Have Danced All Night" (Florence Henderson); 5. "The Hustle" (Robert Reed, Florence Henderson, Barry Williams, Maureen McCormick, Christopher Knight, Geri Reischl, Mike Lookinland and Susan Olsen); 6. "(Shake, Shake, Shake) Shake Your Booty" (Robert Reed, Florence Henderson, Ann B. Davis, Barry Williams, Maureen McCormick, Christopher Knight, Geri Reischl, Mike Lookinland and Susan Olsen); 9. "Memories" (Florence Henderson)
Notes: Barry Williams performs Corner of the Sky from Pippin, the Broadway musical which he resigned from to appear in this series.
2	January 23, 1977	0101	Jack Regas	Ronny Graham, Terry Hart, Bruce Vilanch, Steve Bluestein, Mike Kagan	Lee Majors, Farrah Fawcett, Kaptain Kool and the Kongs (Michael Lembeck, Louise DuArt, Debra Clinger and Mickey McMeel)
Plot: When the Bradys spend their first night in their new home, they find themselves with two unexpected houseguests: Lee Majors and Farrah Fawcett.
Musical numbers: 1. "The Yankee Doodle Boy" (Robert Reed, Florence Henderson, Barry Williams, Maureen McCormick, Christopher Knight, Geri Reischl, Mike Lookinland and Susan Olsen); 2. "Razzle Dazzle" (Robert Reed, Florence Henderson, Barry Williams, Maureen McCormick, Christopher Knight, Geri Reischl, Mike Lookinland and Susan Olsen); 3. "The Wicked Witch's Song" (Ann B. Davis); 4. "Car Wash" (Barry Williams, Maureen McCormick, Christopher Knight and Rip Taylor); 5. "Your Song" (Geri Reischl); 6. "Send in the Clowns" (Florence Henderson); 7. "Names" (Kaptain Kool and the Kongs – Michael Lembeck, Louise DuArt, Debra Clinger and Mickey McMeel); 8. Heart Medley: 1. "You've Gotta Have Heart" (Barry Williams, Maureen McCormick, Christopher Knight, Geri Reischl, Mike Lookinland and Susan Olsen); 2. "Heart and Soul" (Robert Reed and Florence Henderson); 3. "Happy Heart" (Robert Reed, Florence Henderson, Barry Williams, Maureen McCormick, Christopher Knight, Geri Reischl, Mike Lookinland and Susan Olsen); 4. "Heart of My Heart" (Robert Reed and Florence Henderson); 5. "Don't Go Breaking My Heart" (Barry Williams, Maureen McCormick, Christopher Knight, Geri Reischl, Mike Lookinland, Susan Olsen and Kaptain Kool and the Kongs); 6. "How Can You Mend a Broken Heart" (Florence Henderson); 7. "Heartbeat, It's a Love Beat" (Robert Reed, Florence Henderson, Ann B. Davis, Barry Williams, Maureen McCormick, Christopher Knight, Geri Reischl, Mike Lookinland, Susan Olsen, Rip Taylor and Kaptain Kool and the Kongs); 9. "United We Stand" (Robert Reed, Florence Henderson, Barry Williams, Maureen McCormick, Christopher Knight, Geri Reischl, Mike Lookinland and Susan Olsen)
Notes: Rip Taylor joins the cast, credited as a guest-star.; Geri Reischl re-recorded "Your Song" in 2011. It was first released on the single "Fake Jan Sings for Real" and later included on her full-length album 1200 Riverside. Footage from this episode is incorporated into the official music video, along with many other Brady Bunch references and brief cameo appearances by Susan Olsen and Mike Lookinland.; The debut broadcast was sponsored by Oscar Mayer and, as the Bradys exited the stage, an animated mascot marched across the screen brandishing the company's logo. This bit of animation was omitted from subsequent reruns.; During the "Car Wash" number, the headdress worn by dancer Charkie Phillips was fastened so tightly that she was in excruciating pain and discovered her head was bleeding when it was removed.; Guest-star Debra Clinger (of Kaptain Kool and the Kongs) was one of singers for "Rock Flowers", a line of dolls for Mattel toys which were marketed with tie-in record albums. Geri Reischl starred in a series of commercials for Mattel culminating with the Rock Flowers campaign and was the prototype for the "Heather" doll.
3	February 27, 1977	0102	Jack Regas	Ronny Graham, Terry Hart, Bruce Vilanch, Steve Bluestein, Mike Kagan, Carl Kleinshmitt	Milton Berle, Tina Turner, Collette
Plot: When Bobby asks Milton Berle to appear on the show, the showman promptly runs amok.
Musical numbers: 1. "Hooray for Hollywood" (Robert Reed, Florence Henderson, Barry Williams, Maureen McCormick, Christopher Knight, Geri Reischl, Mike Lookinland and Susan Olsen); 2. "Make 'Em Laugh" (Robert Reed, Florence Henderson, Barry Williams, Maureen McCormick and Christopher Knight); 3. "Make 'Em Laugh (reprise)" (Ann B. Davis and Rip Taylor); 4. "Sing" (Christopher Knight and Collette); 5. "Hooray for Hollywood (reprise)" (Robert Reed, Florence Henderson, Barry Williams, Maureen McCormick, Christopher Knight, Geri Reischl, Mike Lookinland and Susan Olsen); 6. "The Rubberband Man" (Tina Turner); 7. "Evergreen (Love Theme from A Star Is Born)" (Florence Henderson); 8. Stars Medley: 1. "Catch a Falling Star" (Robert Reed and Florence Henderson); 2. "You Don't Have to Be a Star (To Be in My Show)" (Barry Williams, Maureen McCormick, Christopher Knight, Geri Reischl, Mike Lookinland and Susan Olsen); 3. "You Are My Lucky Star" (Florence Henderson); 4. "Everybody is a Star" (Barry Williams, Maureen McCormick, Christopher Knight, Geri Reischl, Mike Lookinland and Susan Olsen); 5. "Don't Let the Stars Get in Your Eyes" (Milton Berle, Florence Henderson and Tina Turner); 6. "Good Morning Starshine" (Robert Reed, Florence Henderson, Barry Williams, Maureen McCormick, Christopher Knight, Geri Reischl, Mike Lookinland, Susan Olsen, Ann B. Davis and Rip Taylor); 7. "Shining Star" (Robert Reed, Florence Henderson, Barry Williams, Maureen McCormick, Christopher Knight, Geri Reischl, Mike Lookinland and Susan Olsen); 9. "United We Stand" (Robert Reed, Florence Henderson, Barry Williams, Maureen McCormick, Christopher Knight, Geri Reischl, Mike Lookinland and Susan Olsen)
Notes: A puppet named Collette (voiced by Florence Henderson) sings a duet with Peter. Collette appeared in various Krofft productions dating back to The Dean Martin Show.; The lyrics to "Hooray for Hollywood" were altered to include references to H. R. Pufnstuf, Laverne & Shirley and Jo Anne Worley.; Writer Bruce Vilanch accosted guest-star Milton Berle backstage and asked to see his infamous endowment, but his request was denied.
4	March 4, 1977	0103	Jack Regas	Ronny Graham, Bruce Vilanch, Steve Bluestein, Mike Kagan, Carl Kleinshmitt	Vincent Price, H.R. Pufnstuf (Van Snowden), Kiki Bird (Sharon Baird)
Plot: When Greg decides to move out on his own, Vincent Price warns him that his new apartment is haunted.
Musical numbers: 1. "(Keep Your) Sunny Side Up" (Robert Reed, Florence Henderson, Barry Williams, Maureen McCormick, Christopher Knight, Geri Reischl, Mike Lookinland and Susan Olsen); 2. "It's Not Where You Start" (Robert Reed, Florence Henderson, Barry Williams, Maureen McCormick, Christopher Knight, Geri Reischl, Mike Lookinland and Susan Olsen); 3. "Traces (of Love)" / "All by Myself" (Florence Henderson and Barry Williams); 4. "Celebration" (vocals by Elton John, performed by H.R. Pufnstuf); 5. "Time in a Bottle" (Maureen McCormick); 6. Happy Medley: 1. "I Want to Be Happy" (Robert Reed and Florence Henderson); 2. "You've Made Me So Very Happy" (Barry Williams); 3. "Make Someone Happy" (Florence Henderson); 4. "Happy Together" (Barry Williams, Maureen McCormick, Christopher Knight, Geri Reischl, Mike Lookinland and Susan Olsen); 5. "Put on a Happy Face" (Robert Reed, Florence Henderson, Ann B. Davis and Rip Taylor); 6. "Happy Days" (Robert Reed, Florence Henderson, Barry Williams, Maureen McCormick, Christopher Knight, Geri Reischl, Mike Lookinland, Susan Olsen, Ann B. Davis and Rip Taylor); 7. "United We Stand" (Robert Reed, Florence Henderson, Barry Williams, Maureen McCormick, Christopher Knight, Geri Reischl, Mike Lookinland and Susan Olsen)
Notes: Ted Knight was originally slated to guest-star, but he backed out and was replaced by Vincent Price.; In a lurch without a musical guest, they brought in H.R. Pufnstuf, who pantomimed to an original Elton John song that was recorded for a puppet show at the recently defunct theme park The World of Sid & Marty Krofft.
5	March 21, 1977	0104	Jack Regas	Ronny Graham, Bruce Vilanch, Steve Bluestein, Mike Kagan, Carl Kleinshmitt	Charo, The Hudson Brothers
Plot: When his family criticizes his singing and dancing talents, Mike decides to prove he can carry a tune. But when he teams up with Charo for rehearsal, Carol becomes jealous.
Musical numbers: 1. "Toot, Toot, Tootsie (Goo' Bye)" (Robert Reed, Florence Henderson, Barry Williams, Maureen McCormick, Christopher Knight, Geri Reischl, Mike Lookinland and Susan Olsen); 2. "Malagueña" (guitar solo by Charo); 3. "Singin' in the Rain" / "Stormy Weather" (Rip Taylor); 4. "Sorry Seems to Be the Hardest Word" (Florence Henderson); 5. "I've Grown Accustomed to Her Face" (Robert Reed); 6. "Strike Up the Band" / "Seventy-Six Trombones" (Robert Reed, Florence Henderson, Barry Williams, Maureen McCormick and Christopher Knight); 7. "Disco Queen" (The Hudson Brothers); 8. Places Medley: 1. "Chicago (That Toddlin' Town)" (Robert Reed and Florence Henderson); 2. "California Dreamin'" (Maureen McCormick); 3. "Back Home Again in Indiana" (Florence Henderson); 4. "Do You Know the Way to San Jose" (Barry Williams, Maureen McCormick, Christopher Knight, Geri Reischl, Mike Lookinland and Susan Olsen); 5. "Theme from San Francisco" (Robert Reed and Florence Henderson); 6. "Philadelphia Freedom" (Barry Williams and The Hudson Brothers); 7. "America" (Charo); 8. "Big D" (Ann B. Davis and Rip Taylor); 9. "America (reprise)" (Robert Reed, Florence Henderson, Barry Williams, Maureen McCormick, Christopher Knight, Geri Reischl, Mike Lookinland, Susan Olsen, Ann B. Davis, Rip Taylor, Charo and The Hudson Brothers); 9. "United We Stand" (Robert Reed, Florence Henderson, Barry Williams, Maureen McCormick, Christopher Knight, Geri Reischl, Mike Lookinland and Susan Olsen)
Notes
6	March 28, 1977	0105	Jack Regas	Ronny Graham, Bruce Vilanch, Steve Bluestein, Mike Kagan, Carl Kleinshmitt	Edgar Bergen, Charlie McCarthy, Rich Little, Melanie Safka and Van Snowden
Plot: Rich Little develops amnesia and believes he is one of the Brady children.
Musical numbers: 1. "I've Got the Music in Me" (Robert Reed, Florence Henderson, Barry Williams, Christopher Knight, Geri Reischl, Mike Lookinland and Susan Olsen); 2. "Consider Yourself" (Robert Reed, Florence Henderson, Barry Williams, Christopher Knight, Geri Reischl, Mike Lookinland and Susan Olsen); 3. "Hello, Dolly!" (Rich Little); 4. "Cyclone" (Melanie Safka); 5. "Beautiful Noise" (Florence Henderson); 6. "Ease On down the Road" (Barry Williams, Maureen McCormick, Christopher Knight, Ann B. Davis and Rip Taylor); 7. Movie Medley: 1. "That's Entertainment!" (Robert Reed and Florence Henderson); 2. "Pinball Wizard" (Barry Williams, Maureen McCormick, Christopher Knight, Geri Reischl, Mike Lookinland and Susan Olsen); 3. "For All We Know" (Florence Henderson); 4. "The Pink Panther Theme" (instrumental); 5. "Live and Let Die" (Barry Williams, Maureen McCormick, Christopher Knight, Geri Reischl, Mike Lookinland and Susan Olsen); 6. "Supercalifragilisticexpialidocious" (Ann B. Davis, Rip Taylor and Rich Little); 7. "Over the Rainbow" (Melanie Safka); 8. "That's Entertainment! (reprise)" (Robert Reed, Florence Henderson, Barry Williams, Maureen McCormick, Christopher Knight, Geri Reischl, Mike Lookinland, Susan Olsen, Ann B. Davis and Rip Taylor); 8. "United We Stand" (Robert Reed, Florence Henderson, Barry Williams, Maureen McCormick, Christopher Knight, Geri Reischl, Mike Lookinland and Susan Olsen)
Notes: Maureen McCormick was absent during the first two musical numbers: "I've Got the Music in Me" and "Consider Yourself", as she failed to show up for the episode's first day of taping, causing both performances to be restaged without her, with Susan Olsen lip-synching McCormick’s pre-recorded vocal solos on "I've Got the Music in Me"; and Barry Williams dancing by himself at one point on "Consider Yourself" while the rest of the cast were seen doing the choreography in pairs; and the producers had to delegate McCormick’s acting parts to other cast members. Even producer Marty Krofft considered Geri Reischl to take McCormick's vocal part on "Ease On down the Road" in case she did not show up the next day of taping, however, McCormick returned to the set that evening.
7	April 4, 1977	0106	Jack Regas	Ronny Graham, Bruce Vilanch, Steve Bluestein, Mike Kagan, Carl Kleinshmitt	Robert Hegyes, Redd Foxx, Ohio Players, Sharon Baird
Plot: Marcia announces her engagement to Winston Beaumont (Robert Hegyes), a carefree hippie. Meanwhile, Redd Foxx lurks around the set in preparation for his upcoming variety show, The Redd Foxx Comedy Hour.
Musical numbers: 1. "Celebrate" (Robert Reed, Florence Henderson, Barry Williams, Maureen McCormick, Christopher Knight, Geri Reischl, Mike Lookinland and Susan Olsen); 2. "If My Friends Could See Me Now" (Robert Reed, Florence Henderson, Barry Williams, Maureen McCormick, Christopher Knight, Geri Reischl, Mike Lookinland and Susan Olsen); 3. "Southern Nights" (Barry Williams, Maureen McCormick and Geri Reischl); 4. "Fire" (The Ohio Players); 5. "How Lucky Can You Get?" (Florence Henderson); 6. Spring Medley: 1. "April Showers" (Robert Reed and Florence Henderson); 2. "(I Never Promised You a) Rose Garden" (Geri Reischl); 3. "Spring Will Be a Little Late This Year" (Florence Henderson); 4. "Paper Roses" (Barry Williams, Maureen McCormick, Christopher Knight, Geri Reischl, Mike Lookinland and Susan Olsen); 5. "Tiptoe Through the Tulips" (Ann B. Davis and Rip Taylor); 6. "Stop and Smell the Roses" (Barry Williams); 7. "Laughter in the Rain" (Robert Reed, Florence Henderson, Barry Williams, Maureen McCormick, Christopher Knight, Geri Reischl, Mike Lookinland, Susan Olsen, Ann B. Davis and Rip Taylor); 7. "United We Stand" (Robert Reed, Florence Henderson, Barry Williams, Maureen McCormick, Christopher Knight, Geri Reischl, Mike Lookinland and Susan Olsen)
Notes: Geri Reischl re-recorded "Southern Nights" and "(I Never Promised You a) Rose Garden" for her 2011 album 1200 Riverside.; "(I Never Promised You a) Rose Garden" was popularized by Lynn Anderson, who later guest starred on the show.; The song "Fire" by The Ohio Players, would later serve as the official theme song of the Fox reality cooking show Hell's Kitchen.; "Singin' in the Rain" was performed by The Krofftettes at the start of its Spring Medley.
8	April 25, 1977	0107	Jack Regas	Ronny Graham, Bruce Vilanch, Steve Bluestein, Mike Kagan, Carl Kleinshmitt	Fred Berry, Haywood Nelson, Ernest Lee Thomas, Danielle Spencer, Rick Dees, Patty Maloney, Mike Kagan, Bruce Vilanch
Plot: When the Brady Kids announce that they have invited the kids from What's Happening!! to appear on their variety show, their parents inform them that a last-minute addition to the show is not possible.
Musical numbers: 1. "Get Ready" (Robert Reed, Florence Henderson, Barry Williams, Maureen McCormick, Christopher Knight, Geri Reischl, Mike Lookinland and Susan Olsen); 2. "Walk Right In" (Robert Reed, Florence Henderson, Barry Williams, Maureen McCormick and Christopher Knight); 3. "Thank God I'm a Country Girl" (Ann B. Davis); 4. "The Sound of Music" (Geri Reischl); 5. "Dis-Gorilla" (Rick Dees); 6. "This Masquerade" (Florence Henderson); 7. Disco Medley: 1. "Turn the Beat Around" (Barry Williams, Maureen McCormick, Christopher Knight, Geri Reischl, Mike Lookinland and Susan Olsen); 2. "Those Were the Days" (Robert Reed and Florence Henderson); 3. "Enjoy Yourself with Me" (Barry Williams); 4. "Disco Duck" (Rick Dees and Patty Maloney); 5. "Tangerine" (Ann B. Davis and Rip Taylor); 6. "Dancing Machine" (Fred Berry, Haywood Nelson, Ernest Lee Thomas and Danielle Spencer); 7. "Disco Lucy" ("I Love Lucy Theme") (Robert Reed, Florence Henderson, Barry Williams, Maureen McCormick, Christopher Knight, Geri Reischl, Mike Lookinland and Susan Olsen); 8. "You Make Me Feel Like Dancing" (Robert Reed, Florence Henderson, Barry Williams, Maureen McCormick, Christopher Knight, Geri Reischl, Mike Lookinland, Susan Olsen, Ann B. Davis, Rip Taylor, Rick Dees, Fred Berry, Haywood Nelson, Ernest Lee Thomas and Danielle Spencer); 8. "United We Stand" (Robert Reed, Florence Henderson, Barry Williams, Maureen McCormick, Christopher Knight, Geri Reischl, Mike Lookinland and Susan Olsen)
Notes
9	May 25, 1977	0108	Jack Regas	Ronny Graham, Bruce Vilanch, Steve Bluestein, Mike Kagan, Carl Kleinshmitt	Paul Williams, Lynn Anderson
Plot: When Paul Williams arrives to rehearse for the show, he confesses his love for Carol. Meanwhile, Jan swoons over guest star Lynn Anderson.
Musical numbers: 1. "I Got Love" (Robert Reed, Florence Henderson, Barry Williams, Maureen McCormick, Christopher Knight, Geri Reischl, Mike Lookinland and Susan Olsen); 2. "We Got Us" (from Golden Rainbow) (Florence Henderson, Barry Williams, Maureen McCormick, Christopher Knight, Geri Reischl, Mike Lookinland and Susan Olsen); 3. "Me and My Shadow" (Christopher Knight and Rip Taylor); 4. "Right Time of the Night" (Lynn Anderson); 5. "The Hell of It" (Paul Williams); 6. "Born to Say Goodbye" (Florence Henderson); 7. Music Medley: 1. "Music! Music! Music!" (Robert Reed and Florence Henderson); 2. "What Have They Done to My Song, Ma?" (Maureen McCormick); 3. "The Sweetest Sounds" (Florence Henderson); 4. "Music Is My Life" (Barry Williams); 5. "Hey Mister Melody" (Geri Reischl); 6. "The Music Goes Round and Round" (Ann B. Davis and Rip Taylor); 7. "An Old Fashioned Love Song" (Paul Williams and Lynn Anderson); 8. "Piano Man" (Barry Williams, Maureen McCormick, Christopher Knight, Geri Reischl, Mike Lookinland and Susan Olsen); 9. "I Believe in Music" (Robert Reed, Florence Henderson, Barry Williams, Maureen McCormick, Christopher Knight, Geri Reischl, Mike Lookinland, Susan Olsen, Ann B. Davis, Rip Taylor, Paul Williams and Lynn Anderson); 8. "United We Stand" (Robert Reed, Florence Henderson, Barry Williams, Maureen McCormick, Christopher Knight, Geri Reischl, Mike Lookinland and Susan Olsen)
Notes: Florence Henderson's recording of "Born to Say Goodbye" was released as a single in 1977, and later included on her debut studio album With One More Look At You in 1979. It was also included on the album It's a Sunshine Day: The Best of The Brady Bunch. This is the only audio recording from the show to be officially released.; Geri Reischl re-recorded a solo rendition of "I Believe in Music" for her 2011 album 1200 Riverside.; The producers asked aspiring country singer Geri Reischl which country star she would like to see appear on the show and she chose Lynn Anderson and Tammy Wynette.; The recording of "The Hell of It" is lifted from the soundtrack for Phantom of the Paradise. Paul Williams performed the song in an attempt to boost awareness of the film.; Lynn Anderson later referred to Paul Williams as her "almost brother-in-law." Although they never married, Anderson maintained a decades-long relationship with Williams' brother, whom she began dating in the early 1980s.; "What Have They Done to My Song, Ma?" was written by previous guest star Melanie Safka.; According to various cast and crew members, former alcoholic Paul Williams got very drunk before they filmed the closing number.

== Home media ==
The first and fourth episodes were released on VHS and DVD in the United States in 2000 by Rhino Entertainment under license from the Kroffts.

== The Brady Bunch Variety Hour in popular culture ==
- TV Guide listed the series at No. 4 in a 2002 compilation of the 50 worst television series in American history.
- The show is the subject of a 2009 coffee table book titled Love to Love You Bradys by Susan Olsen (Cindy Brady). It was released in September 2009 by ECW Press. In addition to many color photos and artwork, the book features over 100 new interviews including the Brady Bunch, Sid Krofft, Marty Krofft, Sherwood Schwartz, Bruce Vilanch, Rip Taylor, and Paul Shaffer.
- This show was parodied on a season three episode of That '70s Show ("Red Sees Red"). The entire family, due to a forced curfew, is sitting around watching the show and each one leaves separately in anger (Red himself remarking that "This show is crap!"). Kitty then daydreams that she and her own family are the stars of a similar show in which they perform "I've Got the Music in Me" before Charo makes a surprise appearance. As the daydream ends, Kitty remarks, "Oh no, this is crap".
- The show was also parodied as part of "The Simpsons Spin-Off Showcase", wherein the Simpson family stars in a variety show spin-off of their show titled The Simpson Family Smile-Time Variety Hour. It was noted during the show that Lisa Simpson had refused to participate (in much the same way Eve Plumb did), so she was replaced with a much older prom queen-type who also claimed to be Lisa.
- In a season three episode of Tiny Toon Adventures titled "Grandma's Dead," Elmyra's pet hamster Jan Brady dies. Ultimately, she gets a new hamster which she also names Jan Brady and refers to as a "midseason replacement".
- In the Gilmore Girls episode "Application Anxiety", Rory and Lorelai are watching The Brady Bunch Variety Hour when Rory's Harvard application comes in the mail.
- In Mighty Morphin Power Rangers: The Movie Ivan Ooze mentions the Black Plague, the Spanish Inquisition and the "Brady bunch reunion" as three terrible things in history he missed out on.
