= Lynne Latham =

American dancer and actress

Lynne Latham (sometimes credited as Lynn Latham) is an American dancer, actress and designer who began her career on television with featured roles on The Dean Martin Show and also went on tour with Sammy Davis Jr..

== Early life ==
Lynne Latham was born on May 29, 1948, in Iowa City, Iowa, to Kenneth Dale Latham (1926–2009) and Joyce L. Myers (1927–1975) and initially lived in Sioux City. Kenneth, born in 1926, was a musician who had served in the Navy during World War II and later worked for the Chicago and North Western Railroad Company. The family lived with her paternal grandparents, William Latham, a piano tuner and Ethel Latham (née Hess), Iowa's first Braille switchboard operator who was a prominent advocate for the blind was honored as Sioux City Rotary Club's Citizen of the Year in 1957. The family moved to Alhambra, California when Latham was seven Her mother became a librarian at Montebello Schools after the move and her maternal grandparents, Fred and Hester (née Pearson), who had worked in dress alterations, soon moved to California as well.

Lynne Latham attended Alhambra High School and started dancing at the age of fourteen. She later majored in theater arts at California State College but in her senior year she began to get jobs at Disneyland, the Greek Theatre and then landed the post of lead dancer for a tour with Sammy Davis Jr, so she left college to pursue these opportunities in show business.

== Career ==
=== Performing arts ===
Latham spent a year with the Sammy Davis Jr touring company and then first appeared in The Dean Martin Show as a dancer in 1969 in the fifth season. In 1970 she auditioned alongside hundreds of applicants for a spot with the Ding-a-Lings on the show. She was chosen to be one of the four Ding-a-ling Sisters for the 1971–1972 season and as the oldest of the four was sometimes called by her fellow Ding-a-Lings "mother". Latham was also interviewed by Johnny Carson after landing the role. She remained through the first half of the 1972–1973 season. In 1976 Latham appeared in nine episodes of The Brady Bunch Hour working as a synchronized swimmer on television with The Krofftettes, and also in The Big Show.

She was then cast as an immortal muse in the film Xanadu (1980) starring opposite Olivia Newton-John. Roles then followed in the films History of the World: Part I (1981), The Great Muppet Caper (1981) and Annie (1982).

However, in the mid-80s, Latham moved behind the camera for a time working with casting and production and moved more firmly into fashion design.

=== Later career - fashion and design ===
Before Latham had joined the Dean Martin Show, she already had keen hobby, designing her own clothes. She began mixing fashion design with acting. She was making her own costumes and whilst on the road was sewing for her dancing teammates. She then moved on to making chamois skin bikinis in her hotel room between shows. She then expanded to recycled denim and T-shirts jazzed up with rhinestones. By 1974 these were being sold at a number of shops under her label "LL". In 1974 she also moved into designing tailored sportswear. At the same time, she continued to work in the theatrical business.

Lynne later lived in India for several years as a colorist. Latham became an accomplished pattern maker, and built her experience and construction expertise in leather goods, luggage, briefcases, wallets, and other accessories. She did freelance work, designing jeans for Guess and also wardrobe for celebrities, amongst whom included Cher.

She then became Designer and Product Development Manager for Junior Drake Handbags before moving to California-based Girari Design. With Girari, she headed up the design team to collaborate with Zandra Rhodes in designing the 2007 Handbag collection.

Latham became a certified Permaculture Designer and LEED Accredited Professional, specializing in sustainable design after studying architecture and interior design at UCLA in the 2000s.

== Personal life ==
Latham married Jonathan Stone in 1969. The couple divorced in 1971. Three years later in 1974, her parents divorced, a year before her mother's death. A strong advocate for environmental causes, Lynne lives in a fully sustainable, off-the-grid home in the Tehachapi Mountains.

== See also ==
- The Krofftettes
- The Brady Bunch Hour
- Xanadu
