= The New Adventures of Gilligan =

- Title card
- Created by: Sherwood Schwartz
- Based on: Gilligan's Island by Sherwood Schwartz
- Creative director: Don Christensen
- Voices of: Bob Denver; Alan Hale Jr. Russell Johnson; Jim Backus; Natalie Schafer; Jane Webb; Lou Scheimer
- Country of origin: United States
- No. of seasons: 2
- No. of episodes: 24

Production
- Executive producer: Sherwood Schwartz
- Producers: Norm Prescott; Lou Scheimer
- Running time: approx. 30 min. (per episode)
- Production company: Filmation

Original release
- Network: ABC
- Release: September 7, 1974 – October 18, 1975

Related
- Gilligan's Island; Rescue from Gilligan's Island

The New Adventures of Gilligan is an American Saturday morning animated series produced by Filmation, which aired on ABC during the 1974–75 seasons. The show was based on the 1964–67 sitcom Gilligan's Island. In 1982, Filmation produced a sequel, Gilligan's Planet.

== Premise ==
The New Adventures of Gilligan was based on the 1964–67 CBS television series Gilligan's Island and featured all of the characters from that show. Most of the original cast reprised their roles and provided their voices for the animated series, with the exception of Tina Louise and Dawn Wells. Louise wanted to distance herself from the role of Ginger Grant (consequently, the animated Ginger changed from a redhead to a platinum blonde in case Louise objected to Filmation using her image) and Wells was on the road in a play and unavailable. Jane Webb provided the voices for both Ginger and Mary Ann, credited under her married name (Jane Edwards) for Mary Ann and her maiden name (Jane Webb) for Ginger.

The overall storyline of the animated series was the same as the original live-action show, and the plots of the individual episodes were similar to those of the original series. A first mate and his skipper set out on a three-hour tour with five passengers and end up stranded on an uncharted desert isle. The one change was the introduction of Snubby, an anthropomorphic monkey who is befriended by Gilligan.

Much like other Filmation series at the time, the stories were aimed more at children and often contained a moral lesson; many of the episodes concluded with an "educational tag" where Skipper and Gilligan would talk about whatever lesson they had learned that day. The show worked with an educational consultant, Dr. Nathan Cohen of UCLA, to supervise the educational content.

== Cast ==
- Bob Denver as Willy Gilligan
- Alan Hale Jr. as Skipper Jonas Grumby
- Jim Backus as Thurston Howell III
- Natalie Schafer as Eunice Wentworth "Lovey" Howell
- Russell Johnson as Professor Roy Hinkley
- Jane Webb as Ginger Grant, Mary Ann Summers
- Lou Scheimer as Snubby (uncredited)

== Production ==
The series was produced by Filmation Associates, who first approached Sherwood Schwartz to license the show in 1971, and again in 1972 and 1973. According to Filmation co-founder Lou Scheimer, Schwartz was in the middle of trying to revive the live-action series and declined to have the show adapted into a cartoon. By 1974, after failing to sell a Gilligan's Island revival to any of the networks, Schwartz agreed to license the show, on condition that he was allowed to have great creative input, including hands-on supervision of not only the scripts, but the storyboards as well.

Like the original series, The New Adventures of Gilligan contained an adult laugh track, which was common practice with most Saturday-morning cartoons of the era. One unique feature of Gilligan was the fact that it was produced and animated in the United States, where most shows at that time were animated overseas in order to cut production costs. However, Filmation's dedication to having its shows produced locally did not help the production values, as many felt the animation of Gilligan was of poor quality. As the series did not secure the rights to "The Ballad of Gilligan's Isle", a spoken-word poem with lyrics and backing music vaguely reminiscent of the theme (but distinct enough to avoid copyright issues) was substituted as the opening introduction. All of the voice actors except for Bob Denver read portions of the poem.

The show debuted on ABC Saturday morning on September 7, 1974. The series ran for two seasons and 24 episodes, a length that networks rarely exceeded for Saturday morning animated series in the 1970s as a 22-episode run was considered a success. The network, still reeling from the ratings disaster in 1975–76 connected with Uncle Croc's Block, was reluctant to order anything new from Filmation Associates. Reruns of the series aired on Sunday mornings during the 1976–77 season.

In 1982, another Gilligan's Island-based animated series was created, this time entitled Gilligan's Planet. The premise for that series centered around the castaways creating a spaceship and winding up on a deserted planet.

The series is owned by Warner Bros. Television Studios through Turner Entertainment Co., rather than Filmation's successor Universal Television, due to the show being a part of the pre-May 1986 Metro-Goldwyn-Mayer library.

== Episodes ==
=== Season 1 (1974) ===
No.	Title	Original release date	Prod. code
1	"Off Limits"	September 7, 1974	GI-1
Mr. Howell tricks the other castaways (except the Professor) into building him a private beach club with the promise of membership, but upon completion, he decides that they are not qualified to join. Lovey and he soon grow bored by themselves, and when a typhoon destroys their club, they are forced to re-evaluate their snobbery.
2	"Looney Moon"	September 14, 1974	GI-2
Gilligan and the Skipper discover a pirate's treasure chest, and the other castaways all fight over the gold inside. They soon come to believe a pirate ghost is after them, and become paranoid. The Professor uses Gilligan and some glowing paint to trick them and bring them back to their senses.
3	"Raven Mad"	September 21, 1974	GI-3
The castaways begin to notice that many of their personal possessions are missing, and start accusing one another of being the thief, unaware that the actual culprit is a raven.
4	"Father of His Island"	September 28, 1974	GI-4
The castaways decide that life on the island is too chaotic, and that better leadership is needed. After a long series of arguments and an election, they end up with Gilligan as president.
5	"Wrong Way Robot" "Yeah, Would You Want Your Sister to Marry One?"	October 5, 1974	GI-5
A geological sampling robot, launched from Cape Kennedy, and meant to explore other planets, ends up crashing on the island. With the Professor busy on the other side of the island, the other castaways become convinced that the robot is an alien, and soon let their prejudices about the "alien" and each other cause havoc. When the Professor returns and explains things to them, they realize that the robot could end up saving them, and that they had been bigoted toward it the whole time.
6	"Opening Night"	October 12, 1974	GI-6
Ginger feels her acting career is over, because she has been trapped on the island for so long. The other castaways decide to pretend they are filming a TV special to raise her spirits, unaware that the fake camera Gilligan builds is actually transmitting signals to a nearby aircraft carrier.
7	"Lollipop Casserole"	October 19, 1974	GI-7
The castaways, feeling lazy, force all their chores upon Gilligan, but when they eat the dessert he prepares for them after dinner (using strange beans he found on the other side of the island), they all revert to a childlike mentality, leaving Gilligan stumped as to how to change them back.
8	"The Loners"	October 26, 1974	GI-8
The castaways are all craving some solitude, and they decide to live on their own, leaving Gilligan confused and alone at the compound, with only various animals for company. Things get more complicated when Gilligan digs up an old hot air balloon.
9	"The Ego Trip" "Kon-Tacky"	November 2, 1974	GI-9
Famous explorer Lars Hyerback arrives on the island, and finds the castaways, and they believe rescue is at hand, but unfortunately, Lars is such an egotistical scatterbrain that he cannot remember where his boat is. Meanwhile, the Professor's seismic equipment falsely indicates an incoming disaster, adding to the chaos.
10	"The Olympiad"	November 9, 1974	GI-10
The Professor determines that the island will sink in 25,000 years, but the rest of the castaways mistake the disaster as being imminent. The Skipper builds a raft, and they hold an athletic contest to determine who will command the vessel.
11	"Their Own Image"	November 16, 1974	GI-11
The Skipper misunderstands a conversation, and believes Mary Ann is in love with Gilligan, so he sets about to turn Gilligan into a real man. This eventually leads to Gilligan accidentally saving the Howells' lives, and they then adopt Gilligan as their son. Mr. Howell then proceeds to try to turn Gilligan into G. Howell, the first, but is almost too successful, and Gilligan becomes a snob, too good for anyone.
12	"The Disappearing Act"	November 23, 1974	GI-12
Ginger begins to feel unappreciated, and after overhearing the Professor explaining ESP, decides to pretend she has the ability to see the future. This backfires, and the castaways decide she is a liar who cannot be trusted. Meanwhile, a trunk full of magic gear washes up on one part of the island, and a pair of escaped convicts washes up on another. Gilligan decides he wants to put on a show for everyone, while Ginger tries in vain to convince everyone that she has seen the convicts and their boat.
13	"A Sinking Feeling"	November 30, 1974	GI-13
Mr. Howell hears a story on the radio that leads him to believe lead will soon be more valuable than gold, so he lies to Gilligan to get his help in mining it. Meanwhile, a whaling boat washes ashore, and the rest of the castaways work on getting it seaworthy, unaware that Mr. Howell's lead stockpile will soon ruin their plans.
14	"The Reluctant Hero"	December 7, 1974	GI-14
After a misunderstanding involving a lion, the other castaways are convinced they have to teach Gilligan to be more brave. Their plans repeatedly backfire, but eventually they learn being a man is more than heroics.
15	"The Same Old Dream"	December 14, 1974	GI-15
Gilligan has a dream about a mysterious stranger who teaches him how to turn the radio into a transmitter, so the castaways can send a rescue message. Everyone gets so involved in trying to get Gilligan to remember his dream, they do not notice an actual mysterious stranger is on the island, spying on them.
16	"Sputtering Eagle"	December 21, 1974	GI-16
While flying a toy airplane, Gilligan causes the Professor to hit his head, and he develops amnesia. While only temporary, this ends up being a serious problem when Gilligan discovers the wreckage of a real plane in the jungle, because the Professor is the only one who knows how to fly it.

=== Season 2 (1975) ===
No.	Title	Original release date	Prod. code
17	"Super Gilligan"	August 29, 1975	GI-17
Tired of seeing his fellow castaways becoming apathetic about their daily chores, the Skipper begins bullying everyone into action. While out searching for food, Gilligan is kissed by a strange flower, which gives him super powers. The other castaways enlist Gilligan's help to end the Skipper's bullying, unaware that they should be using his powers to try to escape the island.
18	"Marooned Again"	September 6, 1975	GI-18
Mr. Howell decides that he wants to build a resort on the island, so that once rescued, he can add to his fortune. The other castaways are initially skeptical until he butters them up with promises of lucrative positions once the resort is open. While working on the resort, Gilligan digs up a boat, but shortly thereafter it is found in pieces, leading to suspicion among the castaways.
19	"Live and Let Live"	September 13, 1975	GI-19
Frustration with the animals on the island (especially Gilligan's new elephant friend) leads the castaways to attempt to relocate them to the other side of the island. Meanwhile, two jewel thieves show up on the island, looking for a place to temporarily hide a priceless gem.
20	"Wheels on Parade"	September 20, 1975	GI-20
Dissatisfaction with the island car leads the castaways to fixing it up, but afterwards they cannot decide whose turn it is to use it. They solve the problem by all building their own cars, leading to traffic and chaos, and eventually the island's first courtroom trial.
21	"The Movie Makers"	September 27, 1975	GI-21
Gilligan and Snubby find a crate full of old naval movie equipment, and the castaways decide it would be fun to make a film. They get so busy arguing over what it should be about, and who the star is, that they ignore Snubby, that repeatedly tries to show them a film with instructions on how to build a rescue boat.
22	"Silence Is Leaden"	October 4, 1975	GI-22
A series of practical jokes leads to the Skipper and Mr. Howell refusing to talk to one another. Their feuding complicates the Professor's plan to build a radio tower to help them communicate with a satellite scheduled to fly over the island.
23	"The Great Train Robbery"	October 11, 1975	GI-23
With typhoon season approaching, the Professor draws up plans for a train, and tracks leading to a cave, so the castaways can get to shelter quickly and safely. No one follows his plans properly, however, leading to chaos when an actual typhoon approaches, and Mr. Howell steals the train to ferry his valuables to safety first.
24	"Moderation"	October 18, 1975	GI-24
The Professor's instruments predict prolonged drought, and with food supplies dwindling, the castaways decide to build an irrigation system and start a farm. Mr. Howell cheats, though, using the Professor's photo-enlarging fluid as fertilizer. The others discover this, and begin doing it, too, resulting in giant, but inedible, crops.

== Home media ==
The premiere episode of The New Adventures of Gilligan, "Off Limits", was released as part of Warner Home Video's Saturday Morning Cartoons – 1970s Volume 2 on October 27, 2009. The complete series was originally scheduled to be released on DVD in the spring of 2011, but was pushed back.

The complete series was released on DVD via Warner Archive label.

== See also ==
- List of animated spinoffs from prime time shows
