= Rescue from Gilligan's Island =

1978 television film directed by Leslie H. Martinson

- Title card
- Genre: Adventure; Comedy
- Created by: Sherwood Schwartz
- Written by: Sherwood Schwartz; Elroy Schwartz; Al Schwartz; David Harmon
- Directed by: Leslie H. Martinson
- Starring: Bob Denver; Alan Hale Jr. Dawn Wells; Jim Backus; Natalie Schafer; Russell Johnson; Judith Baldwin
- Theme music composer: Gerald Fried
- Country of origin: United States
- Original language: English

Production
- Executive producer: Sherwood Schwartz
- Producer: Lloyd J. Schwartz
- Cinematography: Robert Primes
- Editor: Marshall Neilan
- Running time: 95 minutes
- Production company: Redwood Productions

Original release
- Network: NBC
- Release: October 14 – October 21, 1978

Related
- The New Adventures of Gilligan; The Castaways on Gilligan's Island

Rescue from Gilligan's Island is a 1978 made-for-television comedy film that continues the adventures of the shipwrecked castaways from the 1964–67 sitcom Gilligan's Island, starring Bob Denver and Alan Hale Jr., and featuring all the original cast with the exception of Tina Louise, who was replaced in the role of Ginger Grant by Judith Baldwin. The film first aired on NBC as a two-part special on October 14 and October 21, 1978. The film has the characters finally being rescued after 15 years on the island. The film was directed by Leslie H. Martinson.

== Plot ==
Fifteen years after the original shipwreck of the S. S. Minnow, the seven castaways are still stranded on the island. Meanwhile, in a Soviet Union-type country, military scientists destroy an orbiting satellite that has a disc containing top-secret information to prevent the satellite from crashing to Earth. The metal disc survives and lands on the island.

The Professor realizes the disc has a unique alloy that can be used to make a new barometer. Using the barometer, the Professor deduces that a huge storm is coming and the tsunami it produces could destroy the island. To survive the deadly wave and potentially effect a rescue, the castaways build a raft by tying their huts together.

The next morning, the castaways awaken and realize they were swept off the island on the makeshift raft. When Gilligan accidentally sets the raft on fire, the United States Coast Guard spots the smoke and rescues them. The raft is towed to Hawaii, where a governor's aide welcomes their return and gives them a congratulatory letter from Jimmy Carter. When they realize this is their first time learning about Watergate, they see how much America has changed. After much media hype, the group reunites at Christmas aboard the S.S. Minnow II.

Foreign spies have discovered that Gilligan has their lost disc and set out to recover it. Meanwhile, Skipper and Gilligan learn that the insurance company refuses to issue a settlement payment for the first Minnow unless all their former passengers sign a statement testifying that the Skipper was not responsible for the shipwreck. They first visit Ginger, who has been cast in a movie, though she is dismayed by how much film industry standards have changed. She agrees to sign the statement. Gilligan and the Skipper then reconnect with the Professor who has found that his castaway celebrity is overshadowing his research work at the university. The Professor also signs the insurance statement while the foreign spies continually attempt to secure the disk from Gilligan. The Skipper and Gilligan next go to see the Howells. They sign the insurance statement after ejecting snobbish friends from their house when they overhear them making disparaging remarks about Gilligan and Skipper. The spies, hidden among the guests, are also ejected.

The two then go to see Mary Ann, who is about to marry her old fiancé, Herbert. She no longer loves him but feels obligated to go through with the wedding. To spare Mary Ann from an unhappy union, Skipper and Gilligan deliberately disrupt the ceremony where the foreign spies are among the guests. Mary Ann is relieved to learn that Herbert actually loves someone else and she signs the insurance statement.

The insurance company finally pays for the first Minnow and the former castaways gather for a reunion cruise aboard the Minnow II. The spies make one last attempt to obtain the disc, but are thwarted by the FBI, who secure the disc from Gilligan. During the cruise, the Minnow II is caught in a storm. Gilligan unknowingly rendered the compass useless by removing its magnet when cleaning it, causing the Skipper to sail in the wrong direction. The group lands on a beach and realize they are on their old island after finding a piece of wood from the original Minnow.

== Cast ==
- Bob Denver as Gilligan
- Alan Hale, Jr. as Jonas "The Skipper" Grumby
- Jim Backus as Thurston Howell III
- Natalie Schafer as Mrs. "Lovey" Howell III
- Judith Baldwin as Ginger Grant
- Russell Johnson as Professor Roy Hinkley
- Dawn Wells as Mary Ann Summers
- Vincent Schiavelli as Dimitri
- Art LaFleur as Ivan
- Norman Bartold as Producer
- Barbara Mallory as Cindy Smith
- June Whitley Taylor as Miss Ainsworth
- Martin Rudy as Dean
- Mary Gregory as Mrs. Devonshire
- Glenn Robards as Mr. Devonshire
- Diana Chesney as Mrs. Fellows
- Victor Rogers as Mr. Fellows
- Michael Flanagan as Director
- Martin Ashe as Butler
- Robert Wood as Tony
- John Wheeler as Studio Guard
- Alex Rodine as 1st Officer
- Don Marshall as FBI Man #1
- Mel Prestidge as Governor's Aide
- Lewis Arquette as Judge
- Judd Laurance as Technician
- Michael Macready as FBI Man #2
- Richard Rorke as Helicopter Pilot
- Marcus K. Mukai as Hawaiian Man
- Snag Werris as Camera Man
- Micki Waugh as Pom Pom Girl
- Alisa Powell as Pom Pom Girl
- Portia Stevens as Pom Pom Girl
- Candace Bowen as Pom Pom Girl
- Mario Machado as Reporter (uncredited)
- Stan Rodarte as Reporter at Homecoming Parade (uncredited)

== Production ==
Tina Louise declined to appear in the movie, claiming that she was not going to reprise the role that she felt had devastated her career. Reportedly she asked for a prohibitively large sum of money. Judith Baldwin, a substantially younger actress who resembled Louise, was cast in her place. The following year, Baldwin would go on to play Ginger again in The Castaways on Gilligan's Island. Cassandra Peterson also auditioned for the part of Ginger, shortly before KHJ-TV offered her the horror-host position as 'Elvira, Mistress of the Dark'.

== Release ==
Rescue from Gilligan's Island aired in two parts on NBC on October 14 and 21, 1978. The first part garnered a 30.2 rating and a 52 share. This was just below the ratings of the top two TV series that season, Laverne & Shirley and Three's Company. The made-for-TV-movie was released on DVD on January 1, 2002, August 1, 2012, June 23, 2015, and July 9, 2015. A Blu-ray edition was released by VarietyFilms.net on October 26, 2022, containing what was then the best available copy derived from upscaled videotapes. An Ultra-HD Blu-ray set with bonus material was released by the same label on July 2, 2024, after a 16mm syndication print was located & scanned in 4K.
