= Judith Baldwin =

American actress

- Born: Judith Lee Baldwin; March 26, 1946 (age 80); Washington, D.C., U.S.
- Occupations: Film, television actress
- Years active: 1969–present
- Known for: Rescue from Gilligan's Island; The Castaways on Gilligan's Island

Judith Lee Baldwin (born March 26, 1946) is an American film and television actress. A life member of the Actors Studio, Baldwin amassed 46 screen credits between 1969 and her leading role in 2005's Every Secret Thing. In 1978, she replaced Tina Louise in the role of Ginger Grant in Rescue from Gilligan's Island. Baldwin reprised the role in The Castaways on Gilligan's Island the following year.

== Early life ==
Judith Baldwin was born in Washington, D.C. She was crowned Miss New Mexico USA 1965 and was the second runner up to Sue Ann Downey in the Miss USA pageant that year. Her first acting job in Hollywood was in 1969 on I Dream of Jeannie in the episode "Jeannie and the Bachelor Party" playing Major Tony Nelson (Larry Hagman)'s secretary Dolores.

== Career ==
In 1987, Baldwin created the role of Beth Logan on the soap opera The Bold and the Beautiful but she was soon replaced by Nancy Burnett, who became more closely identified in the part. Baldwin has guest starred on many television series including, Police Story, Fish, Quincy, M.E., The Dukes of Hazzard, The Fall Guy, T. J. Hooker, Hill Street Blues, Fantasy Island, Archie Bunker's Place, CHiPs, Matt Houston, Emerald Point N.A.S., Brothers, Matlock, Freddy's Nightmares, Empty Nest, Tales from the Crypt, Cybill and Six Feet Under.

Television movies and feature films include: The Seven Minutes, The Stepford Wives, Tales of the Apple Dumpling Girl, Hospital Massacre, I Was a Mail Order Bride, Deal of the Century, No Small Affair, Talking Walls, The Stepford Children, Made in U.S.A., Beaches, Pretty Woman, Exit to Eden, James Dean, The Princess Diaries and Every Secret Thing.

Baldwin, who took over the role of Ginger Grant in Rescue from Gilligan's Island in 1978, appeared with the original Ginger (Tina Louise) three years earlier in the 1975 film The Stepford Wives. Besides being in a few scenes together, the last scene in the movie shows both actresses passing in the supermarket and just glancing at one another. Baldwin appeared in the 1987 made-for-TV sequel The Stepford Children with Barbara Eden.

== Filmography ==
=== Film ===
| Year | Title | Role | Notes |
|---|---|---|---|
| 1971 | The Seven Minutes | Fremont's Girlfriend | |
| 1971 | Evel Knievel | Sorority Girl #1 | |
| 1975 | The Stepford Wives | Patricia Cornell | |
| 1981 | Hospital Massacre | Desk Nurse | |
| 1983 | Deal of the Century | Luckup Hostess #1 | |
| 1984 | No Small Affair | Stephanie | |
| 1987 | Made in U.S.A. | Dorie | |
| 1988 | Beaches | Screaming Woman | |
| 1990 | Pretty Woman | Susan | |
| 1994 | Exit to Eden | Priscilla | |
| 2004 | The Princess Diaries 2: Royal Engagement | Wedding Guest | |
| 2005 | Every Secret Thing | Emily | |

=== Television ===
| Year | Title | Role | Notes |
|---|---|---|---|
| 1969 | I Dream of Jeannie | Dolores | Episode: "Jeannie and the Bachelor Party" |
| 1969–1970 | Bracken's World | Beth / Anne | 4 episodes |
| 1972 | The Delphi Bureau | Penny | Episode: "Pilot" |
| 1977 | Police Story | Marina | Episode: "Spitfire" |
| 1977 | Fish | Naomi | Episode: "Fish and the Rock Star" |
| 1978 | Quincy, M.E. | Marie Yager | Episode: "Ashes to Ashes" |
| 1978 | Rescue from Gilligan's Island | Ginger Grant | Television film |
| 1979 | The Dukes of Hazzard | Female Criminal | Episode: "Repo Men" |
| 1979 | The Castaways on Gilligan's Island | Ginger Grant | Television film |
| 1982 | The Magical World of Disney | Saloon Girl | Episode: "Tales of the Apple Dumpling Gang" |
| 1982 | The Fall Guy | Lynn | Episode: "Soldiers of Misfortune" |
| 1982 | T. J. Hooker | Carol Hayes | Episode: "The Streets" |
| 1982 | Hill Street Blues | Arlene | Episode: "Stan the Man" |
| 1982 | Fantasy Island | Shirley | Episode: "The Kleptomaniac/Thank God, I'm a Country Girl" |
| 1982 | I Was a Mail Order Bride | Rita Kimbel | Television film |
| 1983 | Archie Bunker's Place | Randi | Episode: "Captain Video" |
| 1983 | CHiPs | Camille | Episode: "Fox Trap" |
| 1983 | Emerald Point N.A.S. | Sally | 3 episodes |
| 1984 | Brothers | Judy | Episode: "The Wedding" |
| 1984 | E/R | Woman Eye Patient | Episode: "Son of Sheinfeld" |
| 1987 | The Stepford Children | Kimberly Summer | Television film |
| 1987 | The Bold and the Beautiful | Beth Logan | 27 episodes |
| 1987 | Matlock | Miriam Tracey | Episode: "The Gift" |
| 1988 | What Price Victory | —N/a | Television film |
| 1988 | Weekend War | Kristen | Television film |
| 1988 | Freddy's Nightmares | Jane | Episode: "Mother's Day" |
| 1991 | Empty Nest | Michelle | Episode: "Sucking Up Is Hard to Do" |
| 1993 | Tales from the Crypt | Wither | Episode: "Half-Way Horrible" |
| 1997 | Cybill | Mrs. Hicks | Episode: "Little Bo Peep" |
| 1997–1999 | Women: Stories of Passion | Madame | 2 episodes |
| 2003 | Six Feet Under | Paula Mortimer | Episode: "The Eye Inside" |
| 2008 | Ladies of the House | Amelia | Television film |
| 2012 | Vegas | Dorris Meade | Episode: "Pilot" |
