= The Castaways on Gilligan's Island =

1979 made-for-television film directed by Earl Bellamy

- Title card
- Genre: Comedy
- Written by: Sherwood Schwartz; Al Schwartz; Elroy Schwartz
- Directed by: Earl Bellamy
- Starring: Bob Denver; Alan Hale, Jr. Dawn Wells; Jim Backus; Natalie Schafer; Russell Johnson; Judith Baldwin
- Music by: Gerald Fried
- Country of origin: United States
- Original language: English

Production
- Executive producer: Sherwood Schwartz
- Producer: Lloyd J. Schwartz
- Cinematography: Joe Jackman; Keith Smith
- Editor: Albert J. Zuniga
- Running time: 70 minutes
- Production companies: Redwood Productions; Universal Television

Original release
- Network: NBC
- Release: May 3, 1979

Related
- Rescue from Gilligan's Island; The Harlem Globetrotters on Gilligan's Island

The Castaways on Gilligan's Island is a 1979 made-for-television comedy film that continues the adventures of the shipwrecked castaways from the 1964–1967 sitcom Gilligan's Island and the first reunion movie, Rescue from Gilligan's Island, featuring the original cast from the television series with the exception of Tina Louise, who was replaced in the role of Ginger Grant by Judith Baldwin. Written by Al Schwartz, Elroy Schwartz and series creator Sherwood Schwartz and directed by Earl Bellamy, it was first broadcast on NBC May 3, 1979. Unlike the independently-produced Rescue from Gilligan's Island, this and the subsequent The Harlem Globetrotters on Gilligan's Island were produced by MCA/Universal Television.

== Plot ==
=== Part One ===
The movie picks up twelve days after the end of Rescue from Gilligan's Island. The castaways are once again stranded on the same island they were previously on. They are desperately searching for fresh water, as the tsunami that originally propelled them off the island has caused sulfur to contaminate the island's subterranean springs. To make matters worse, a radio broadcast said efforts to locate the Minnow II have been terminated. Gilligan stumbles upon two previously undiscovered WWII airplanes. It is learned that the island was a base of operations for the Army Air Corps during World War II, and the abandoned hangar was obscured by jungle brush, which the tsunami removed. The Professor believes he can combine the two planes into one and fly them back to civilization. He cobbles together an airworthy plane and, dubbing it Minnow III, the castaways take off.

During the attempt to fly to Hawaii, the plane has engine trouble. The Professor orders Gilligan to jettison some weight, causing him to fall out and parachute down to the island. The castaways opt to return for Gilligan, although the Professor warns it will be impossible to take off again. Immediately after landing, the engine falls off, and the Skipper surmises they would have crashed had they not terminated the flight. Gilligan inadvertently has saved the castaways. The group finds Gilligan is safe but they are dismayed, as the plane was their final hope of rescue. However, a U.S. Navy captain suddenly appears saying that the castaways' plane was detected on radar long enough for them to track it to the island. The castaways once again return to civilization, and the U.S. government pinpoints the island's location to prevent future castaway incidents, as well as annexing it as American territory. After being rescued, Mr. Howell decides to build a resort hotel on the island, calling it a "living tribute" to the years the seven castaways lived together on the island.

=== Part Two ===
The second half picks up a year later with the caption quoting "Same Island, Next Year". The island is now a tropical resort fully linked to civilization called "The Castaways" which is based on the theme of vacationers indulging in a lifestyle similar to the original castaways, without electricity, cars, newspapers, radios, televisions, & telephones as escapism from their everyday routine. The resort is owned by Mr. Howell who also makes the other castaways silent partners in the hotel. The rest of the castaways also work as staff members of the resort, where the Skipper and Gilligan man a motor whale boat, aptly named Minnow IV, that shuttles people to and from cruise ships that stop at the island.

On one such trip, the Minnow IV brings two married couples to the island. One couple has Henry Elliot (Tom Bosley), a workaholic real estate business man from Cleveland, whose wife, Myra (Marcia Wallace), is trying to get to relax and forget about work, as well as an unaccompanied minor named Robbie (Ronnie Scribner). It is initially assumed the kid belonged to either the Elliots or the other couple on the boat, but neither couple claims the boy (the Elliots mention their kids being back home, and Henry actually forgets how many they have). Gilligan chalks it up to the child seeking out his parents, but a later search reveals no family at the resort claiming him as their child.

Henry continues to fuss over work, despite Myra and the rest of the castaways trying to help him relax, but nothing helps; not a massage, not fishing, not snorkeling, nothing. Myra introduces them to another couple from Arizona, of whom the husband says back home he is a dentist and remarks to Henry that he is not talking about teeth while on the resort. Henry even finds the only pay phone on the island (hidden in a fake tree in the lobby used only for emergencies) and tries to call his office back in Cleveland, then panics because no one answers there, only for Myra to remind him of the time zone difference. Henry finally decides to placate his wife by changing out of his suit (which he had been wearing since getting off the Minnow IV) into a pair of shorts and a polo shirt and allows himself to look scruffy. Myra wonders about the sudden change, where it is shown to be an attempt to use reverse psychology to annoy Myra into thinking her husband has become a lazybones and forgetting about any future vacations. Henry exposes himself when Myra overhears him joking to the dentist and his wife about this plan, and she says she will extend the vacation.

Meanwhile, Robbie, the unaccompanied kid, is sneaking around the island, and even snatches a hamburger from the Skipper's plate when he is not looking. As he is doing this, he climbs trees, swings from tree to tree via vines like Tarzan, and even shows a lot of skill as a gymnast. His parents end up coming over from the cruise ship to find him after realizing he was not in the ship's gym or on the boat at all. Gilligan goes out and eventually finds him, and learns he ran away from his parents due to undue pressure put on him to work hard to go to the Olympics, and how he would love to be more like a regular kid and not be practicing for eight hours a day on the weekends. Gilligan does not agree to hide him from his parents and eventually he is reunited with them, where his parents learn why he ran away and agree to dial it down, realizing they never listened to what he really wanted.

Another story is the luau planned for that night and how the Professor found ancient masks to hang at the beach for it. The desk clerk, Naheeti (played by Hawaiian actress Mokihana), warns of evil spirits coming from the masks, which the Professor naturally blows off. He then shows stickers on the insides of the masks saying "MADE IN CHICAGO" to put everyone's mind at ease.

Later on at the luau, Henry is seen finally relaxing for real and enjoying himself, apologizing to Myra for being so uptight. When Myra suggests coming back in a year, Henry says he wants to return in six months and see if he can talk Mr. Howell into building condos on the island (to which Myra laughs). The Professor also admits to everyone that he placed the "MADE IN CHICAGO" stickers on the masks himself to try to prove there is nothing to worry about. Of course, after that, the smaller masks move, and the pole the big mask was on falls onto the table they are sitting at, sending a bowl of poi in the air, landing on the Professor's head. The Professor offers no comment to that.

== Cast ==
- Bob Denver as Gilligan
- Alan Hale as The Skipper-Jonas Grumby
- Russell Johnson as The Professor-Roy Hinkley
- Jim Backus as Mr. Howell
- Natalie Schafer as Mrs. Howell
- Judith Baldwin as Ginger
- Dawn Wells as Mary Ann Summers
- Tom Bosley as Henry Elliott
- Marcia Wallace as Myra Elliott
- Ronnie Scribner as Robbie Sloan
- Judith Searle as Mrs. Sloan
- Rod Browning as Dr. Tom Larsen
- Joan Roberts as Laura Larsen
- Peter MacLean as Fred Sloan
- Natasha Ryan as Little Girl
- Mokihana as Naheeti

== Production ==
In the wake of the ratings success of Rescue from Gilligan's Island, NBC wanted Sherwood Schwartz to produce a new Gilligan's Island series for them. Schwartz objected to reviving the show in its original format due to the aging cast and because he didn't want to repeat his old ideas. He instead suggested the idea of a new hour-long series where the castaways would run a resort hotel on the island, which had been kicked around had the original series not been cancelled, in which the castaways were rescued and elect to build a resort, then being visited by various tourists. Each episode would feature different guest stars with their own storylines, a premise he compared to The Love Boat. NBC agreed and wanted to order seven episodes to begin airing in three months. Schwartz felt that didn't give him enough time and instead made an agreement to produce one pilot for the current TV season, which became this 70-minute TV-movie, with an option to produce seven series episodes for the fall season.

== Release ==
The Castaways on Gilligan's Island aired on NBC on May 3, 1979, from 8:30 to 10:00 p.m. It suffered a sharp decline in the ratings compared to the previous TV-movie. Schwartz blamed this in part on a last-minute change in its air date. It was moved up eight days from what had been previously advertised to a Thursday, a school night for kids, and put up against Mork & Mindy, a top-rated show at that time. In light of the mediocre ratings for the TV-movie, NBC opted not to order the hour-long series.
