= Hospital Massacre =

1981 film by Boaz Davidson

- Theatrical poster
- Directed by: Boaz Davidson
- Screenplay by: Marc Behm
- Story by: Boaz Davidson
- Produced by: Yoram Globus; Menahem Golan
- Starring: Barbi Benton; Charles Lucia; John Warner Williams; Jon Van Ness; Den Surles; Gloria Jean Morrison; Karen Smith
- Cinematography: Nicholas Josef von Sternberg
- Edited by: Jon Koslowsky
- Music by: Arlon Ober
- Production company: Golan-Globus Productions
- Distributed by: Cannon Film Distributors
- Release date: October 16, 1981 (Mexico): July 16, 1982
- Running time: 89 minutes
- Country: United States
- Language: English

Hospital Massacre (also known as X-Ray, Be My Valentine, Or Else, and Ward 13) is a 1981 American slasher film directed by Boaz Davidson and starring Barbi Benton. Its plot follows a woman who becomes trapped on an empty floor of a hospital, where a murderer posing as a surgeon attempts to kill her. The film premiered in Mexico on October 16, 1981, while in the United States it premiered on July 16, 1982.

== Plot ==
In 1961, an unpopular boy named Harold Rusk leaves a Valentine's Day card at the home of the beauty Susan Jeremy. Susan and her friend David mock and crumple up the card, prompting an enraged Harold to break into the house and kill David by hanging him from a hatstand.

Nineteen years later, Susan is divorced, has a daughter, and a new boyfriend named Jack. On Valentine's Day, Susan has Jack take her to a hospital to pick up the results of a standard physical exam, which her new health insurance plan has requested. On the way into the building, she is observed from a window by a man in surgical garb. The man strokes a photograph of a young Susan, and sabotages the elevator Susan boards in order to delay her while he kills Dr. Jacobs, the doctor who has her paperwork, which the murderer tampers with. A janitor later finds Dr. Jacobs' body, and has his face dunked into a sink full of acid by the murderer after trying to follow him into a nearby storeroom.

While looking for her doctor, Susan coerces a friendly intern named Harry into getting her results, which Harry notices are abnormal, prompting him to bring them and Susan to Doctor Saxon. The peculiarities of Susan's paperwork (which the murderer further sabotages after killing a pair of laboratory workers) cause Doctors Saxon and Beam to order that she be detained for observation. Harry uncovers evidence suggesting that someone is pulling a "con job" on Susan, but he disappears after promising Susan he will straighten things out. Jack, who had fallen asleep in his car while waiting for Susan, enters the hospital to look for her, only to find her during her first escape attempt and subsequently waits for her after the doctors find and reprimand her. While he waits, he is lured to an empty hospital room by the killer via a phone call, who then beckons him. Behind a curtain, Jack finds the corpse of one of the nurses before the killer decapitates him with an electric orthopedic saw.

The killer places a large box next to Susan's bed, which she opens to find Jack's severed head. Susan flees in terror to get help, eventually being found by Saxon and a nurse, who return her to her room. When she attempts to show them the contents of the box, it contains only a cake. After Susan tells Saxon about Harry's findings, Saxon goes to look over the copies of her paperwork in the archives. She follows him but spots the killer heading to the archives too, armed with a surgical hatchet. Inside the archives, the killer waits for Saxon in the dark and drives the hatchet into his skull as he tries to flee, before disappearing. Susan witnesses all of this while hiding, her claims of there being a killer on the loose are disbelieved and she is strapped to a gurney after being deemed delirious. The staff prepare to perform emergency surgery on Susan. Nurse Dora is ambushed by the killer in an empty corridor, who chases her and injects her with poison. Dr. Beam is subsequently stabbed through the neck from behind a medical screen while observing Susan's x-rays. The killer then abducts Susan and takes her to a vacant operating room. Susan pulls off the killer's mask to reveal he is Harry, who is really Harold Rusk. When Susan asks what he wants, Harold responds, "What I've always wanted. Your heart".

Before Harold can cut her open, Susan stabs him after he is distracted by some patients, and escapes. Susan is pursued to the roof by the wounded Harold, who she sets on fire after spilling flammable liquid onto him during their chase, and sends him plummeting onto the street below. The next day, Susan is released, and reunites with her daughter and ex-husband outside of the hospital.

== Cast ==
- Barbi Benton as Susan Jeremy
  - Elizabeth Hoy as young Susan
- Charles Lucia as Harold Rusk / Harry
  - Billy Jayne as young Harold
- Jon Van Ness as Jack
- John Warner Williams as Doctor Dan Saxon
- Den Surles as Doctor Beam
- Gloria Jean Morrison as Nurse Dora Anders
- Karen Smith as Nurse Kitty Crandle
- Michael Frost as Ned
- Jimmy Stathis as Tom Jeremy
- Lanny Duncan as Hal
- Marian Beeler as Mrs. Edelman
- Elly Wold as Mrs. Fedrow
- Jonathon Moore as Mrs. Parry
- Gay Austin as Doctor A. Jacobs
- Bill Errigo as The Janitor
- Beverly Hart as Suzy
- Ann Charlotte Lindgren as Nancy Johnson
- Judith Baldwin as Desk Nurse
- Tammy Simpson as Eva Jeremy
- Michael Romano as David
- Don Grenough as The Doctor

== Release ==
The film was released regionally in Wichita, Kansas and a brief run in other states on April 23, 1982.

=== Critical response ===
Jeremy Wheeler of AllMovie said that the film had "zero plot", but was still "a bloody fun time". An overall score of 2½ out of 5 was awarded by Adam Tyner of DVD Talk, who wrote, "X-Ray is kind of dumb and ridiculous, sometimes deliberately and other times not so much. Even though there's basically no gore to speak of, plenty of the red stuff still gets sloshed around. The hospital backdrop opens itself up for some gleefully twisted and frequently medical-themed kills. I really love the score, and my ears are pretty certain those are actual strings and not the usual early-'80s banks of synths. Taken as a pure horror flick, it's a misfire: zero successful scares and not all that much in the way of suspense. As '80s slasher junk food, something I'll never turn down, it's worth watching once. And, yeah, once; not sure this is something I'll ever give a second spin".

DVD Verdict's Tom Becker stated, "While it's fun for a while, X-Ray runs out of steam long before the ending, in which the killer is unmasked, to the surprise of probably no one. An extended final chase also goes on way too long. While the oddness here can be a bit charming—including a bizarre bit that has three elderly women looking for a doctor in a closed-off part of the hospital—it's a few rungs down from must-see, even for fans of '80s slasher sleaze". TV Guide succinctly concluded, "Unless you are a diehard [Barbi] Benton fan, this is a must to avoid".

=== Home media ===
On August 20, 2013, the film was released as a double feature under its X-Ray title with the film Schizoid by Scream Factory on both DVD, and Blu-ray. In March 2022, Vinegar Syndrome reissued the double-feature disc in 4K UHD with newly-commissioned bonus features.

== Sources ==
- Harper, Jim (2004). Legacy of Blood: A Comprehensive Guide to Slasher Movies. Manchester: Critical Vision. ISBN 978-1-900-48639-2.
