= The Three Outlaws =

1956 American western film

- Neville Brand as Butch Cassidy and Alan Hale Jr. as the Sundance Kid
- Directed by: Sam Newfield
- Written by: Orville H. Hampton
- Produced by: Sigmund Neufeld
- Starring: Neville Brand; Alan Hale Jr. Bruce Bennett
- Cinematography: William Bradford
- Edited by: Dwight Caldwell
- Music by: Paul Dunlap
- Production company: Sigmund Neufeld Productions
- Distributed by: Associated Film Releasing Corporation; Exclusive Films (UK)
- Release date: May 13, 1956
- Running time: 64 minutes
- Country: United States
- Language: English

The Three Outlaws is a 1956 American Western film directed by Sam Newfield and starring Neville Brand as Butch Cassidy, Alan Hale Jr. as the Sundance Kid, and Bruce Bennett.

== Cast ==
- Neville Brand as Butch Cassidy
- Alan Hale Jr. as the Sundance Kid
- Bruce Bennett as Charlie Trenton
- Jose Gonzales-Gonzales as El Raton
- Rodolfo Hoyos Jr. as El Gallo
- Jonathan Hale as Pinkerton
- Stanley Andrews as Railroad President
- Lillian Molieri as Rita Aguilar
- Jeanne Carmen as Polimita
- Robert Tafur as Col. Aguilar
- Robert Christopher as Bill Carver
- Vicente Padula as Mr. Gutzmer
- Henry A. Escalante as Corporal
- William Henry as Tall Texan

== Bibliography ==
- Pitts, Michael R. Western Movies: A Guide to 5,105 Feature Films. McFarland, 2012.
