= Matt Houston =

American crime drama series (1982–1985)

- Genre: Crime drama
- Created by: Lawrence Gordon
- Starring: Lee Horsley; Pamela Hensley; John Aprea; Paul Brinegar; Dennis Fimple; Penny Santon; Lincoln Kilpatrick; Buddy Ebsen; George Wyner
- Theme music composer: Dominic Frontiere
- Composer: Nelson Riddle
- Country of origin: United States
- Original language: English
- No. of seasons: 3
- No. of episodes: 69

Production
- Executive producers: Aaron Spelling; Douglas S. Cramer; Lawrence Gordon
- Camera setup: Single-camera
- Running time: 45–48 minutes
- Production companies: Aaron Spelling Productions; Largo Productions; Matt Houston Company

Original release
- Network: ABC
- Release: September 26, 1982 – July 19, 1985

Matt Houston is an American crime drama television series starring Lee Horsley as the title character, a wealthy oilman who holds a side job as a private investigator. Created by Lawrence Gordon and produced by Aaron Spelling, it originally aired on ABC for three seasons from 1982 to 1985.

== Synopsis ==
Matt Houston stars Lee Horsley as a wealthy mustachioed Texas oilman named Matlock "Matt" Houston who works as a private investigator in Los Angeles in his abundant free time. The show also stars Pamela Hensley as his lawyer sidekick, C.J., and George Wyner as his continuously frustrated business manager, Murray. During the show's third and final season (1984–85), Buddy Ebsen played Houston's uncle, Roy Houston.

Most episodes typically involve one of Houston's close friends being murdered or involved in some criminal enterprise, requiring his assistance. C.J. uses an Apple III computer named "Baby" containing a database on virtually all living and deceased persons, allowing her to provide all necessary information. Murray frequently complains that the private investigation business fails to make money because of Matt's lavish expenses, but Matt treats it more as a hobby instead of a profit-making venture.

== Cast ==
- Lee Horsley as Mattlock 'Matt' Houston
- Pamela Hensley as C.J. Parsons
- John Aprea as Lt. Vince Novelli
- Paul Brinegar as Lamar Pettybone
- Dennis Fimple as Bo
- Penny Santon as Mama Rosa Novelli
- Lincoln Kilpatrick as Lt. Michael Hoyt
- Buddy Ebsen as Uncle Roy Houston
- George Wyner as Murray Chase

== Episodes ==
=== Season 1 (1982–83) ===
No. overall	No. in season	Title	Directed by	Written by	Original release date
1	1	"X-22"	Richard Lang	T : Richard Christian Danus; S/T : Ken Trevey	September 26, 1982
2	2	"X-22"	Richard Lang	T : Richard Christian Danus; S/T : Ken Trevey	September 26, 1982
Series pilot: Matt Houston, an oil tycoon's son from Texas, comes to California to manage off-shore drilling. With plenty of cars, a helicopter, and many millionaire toys to choose from, Matt Houston finds plenty of time for his PI hobby. Guest stars: Barbara Carrera, Jill St. John, Art Metrano. Special Guest Star: Dale Robertson.
3	3	"Stop the Presses"	Don Chaffey	James L. Conway	October 3, 1982
A disreputable tabloid's publisher is nearly killed after telling his four worst enemies he plans to run a front-page story on them. Guest Stars: Bradford Dillman, Herb Edelman, Murray Hamilton, Heather Locklear, Stuart Whitman
4	4	"Deadly Fashion"	Richard Lang	S : Erica Byrne & F. Michael Johnson; T : Stephen Lord	October 17, 1982
A famous fashion designer has been murdered and Matt's former girlfriend is under suspicion. Guest stars: Britt Ekland, Cristina Ferrare, Carol Lawrence, Mr. Blackwell, Vic Tayback.
5	5	"Killing Isn't Everything"	Don Chaffey	Robert Bielak	October 24, 1982
A football player is being blackmailed by someone who says they have proof he killed the coach. Guest stars: John Beck, Scott Brady, Dick Butkus, Phyllis Davis, Rockne Tarkington, Forrest Tucker.
6	6	"Who Would Kill Ramona?"	Richard Lang	Michael Fisher	October 31, 1982
When an actor dies after drinking from a tainted glass, the star who it belonged to becomes a suspect. Guest stars: Janet Leigh, Kiel Martin, Cesar Romero, William Smith, Jill Whelan.
7	7	"Recipe for Murder"	Hy Averback	Skip Webster	November 7, 1982
A severed head in gelatin shocks a food critic who recognizes it as belonging to his partner. Guest stars: Sid Caesar, James Coco, David Hedison, Hope Lange, Misty Rowe.
8	8	"Shark Bait"	Corey Allen	Skip Webster	November 21, 1982
Sharks have been attacking beachgoers, and Matt wonders if something sinister might be going on. Guest stars: Lloyd Bochner, Gary Frank, Don Gordon, Dorothy Malone, Michelle Phillips.
9	9	"The Kidnapping"	Barbara Peeters	S : Tim Maschler; T : Michael Fisher	November 28, 1982
A critically ill Arab prince has been abducted. Guest stars: Cesare Danova, Tina Louise, Hugh O'Brian, Richard Romanus.
10	10	"Joey's Here"	Jerome Courtland	S : Robert Dennis; T : Janis Hendler	December 5, 1982
Matt tries to discover why a robot would murder the brother of its genius creator. Guest stars: David Cassidy, Troy Donahue, Norman Fell, Monte Markham, Jessica Walter.
11	11	"The Good Doctor"	Don Weis	S : Brad Radnitz; S/T : James L. Conway	December 12, 1982
During a party at Matt's, a research scientist is murdered. Guest stars: Beverly Garland, Gayle Hunnicutt, Gary Lockwood, Cameron Mitchell, Jeanette Nolan, Susan Tolsky, William Windom.
12	12	"The Rock and the Hard Place"	Kim Manners	Larry Alexander	January 2, 1983
A champion boxer's physical ailments and his wife's addictions come into light after a murder. Guest stars: Dennis Cole, Dorian Harewood, Richard Jaeckel, Diane McBain, Stan Shaw, George Takei, Berlinda Tolbert.
13	13	"The Purrfect Crime"	Mike Vejar	Calvin Clements Jr.	January 9, 1983
When a cat food mogul is found mauled to death by a domesticated tiger, his four ex-wives retain Matt's services so they can receive proceeds from the will. Guest stars: Barbi Benton, Sonny Bono, Pat Crowley, Zsa Zsa Gabor, Gary Grimes, Werner Klemperer, Janis Paige.
14	14	"The Yacht Club Murders"	Cliff Bole	Ned Wynn	January 16, 1983
A yacht club is the target of a killer, concerning someone with ties to Matt. Guest stars: Jimmy Baio, Shelley Berman, Alan Hale, Mary Ann Mobley, Dick Sargent.
15	15	"Whose Party Is It Anyway?"	Cliff Bole	Larry Forrester	January 23, 1983
Five famous folks are summoned to Matt's place through a murderous ruse. Guest stars: Kevin Brophy, Brett Halsey, Edward Mulhare, Barbara Rush, Stella Stevens.
16	16	"Get Houston"	Kim Manners	Calvin Clements Jr.	February 20, 1983
Psychopath Castanos (Chuck Connors) orchestrates attacks on Houston from his padded confinement. Don Stroud appears as Dirk Bronson. Guest stars: Chuck Connors, Dennis Fimple, Ed Nelson, Raymond St. Jacques, Don Stroud
17	17	"The Visitors"	Barbara Peeters	Calvin Clements Jr.	February 27, 1983
A famous scientist suffers a fatal heart attack while witnessing an alleged extraterrestrial visit by an Unidentified Flying Object. Guest stars: Robert Alda, Dane Clark, Shelley Fabares, David Groh, Alex Henteloff, Dawn Wells
18	18	"Here's Another Fine Mess"	Cliff Bole	Robert Brennan	March 6, 1983
Someone is targeting C.J. and her sorority sisters. Guest stars: Ernest Borgnine, Larry Harmon, Rebecca Holden, Anne Jeffreys, Chuck McCann, John Moschitta Jr., Andrew Robinson, Ann Turkel
19	19	"The Beverly Woods Social Club"	Don Chaffey	Skip Webster	March 13, 1983
A gossip columnist is murdered after threatening to expose a high-class prostitution house. Bo Hopkins as Rev. Noah Sunday, Jayne Meadows as Holly Harkens Guest stars: Jayne Meadows Allen, Michael Constantine, Don DeFore, Bo Hopkins, Ben Murphy, Ron Palillo, Natalie Schafer.
20	20	"The Showgirl Murders"	Don Chaffey	James L. Conway	March 20, 1983
Matt's friend, who suffers from alcoholic binges and blackouts, is accused of murder. Guest stars: George Chakiris, Robert Goulet, Fred Grandy, James Luisi, John Moschitta Jr., Renée Taylor.
21	21	"Fear for Tomorrow"	Kim Manners	Michael Fisher	April 3, 1983
When a special code predicts deaths, Matt hunts for clues to prevent them and expose the code's reality. Guest stars: Bruce M. Fischer, Ed Grover, Michael Halsey, Lenore Kasdorf, Lynne Marta, Tim O'Connor, Victoria Spelling.
22	22	"A Deadly Parlay"	Charlie Picerni	S : E. Nick Alexander; S/T : Skip Webster	April 10, 1983
Matt is charged with murdering a jockey whose body he happened upon. Guest stars: Ron Ely, Ed Grover, Peter Isacksen, Lynn-Holly Johnson, Gerald S. O'Loughlin.
23	23	"A Novel Way to Die"	Corey Allen	Skip Webster	April 17, 1983
A mystery is revealed when a murder-mystery writer is found dead at a convention. Guest stars: Norman Alden, Richard Anderson, Joseph Campanella, Denny Miller, Terry Moore, John Moschitta Jr., Markie Post.
24	24	"The Hunted"	Kim Manners	Calvin Clements Jr.	April 24, 1983
A notorious crime leader kidnaps C.J. in order to force a trade for his son who is being held in connection with a terrorism plot. Guest stars: Martin Landau, Mark Shera.

=== Season 2 (1983–84) ===
No. overall	No. in season	Title	Directed by	Written by	Original release date
25	1	"Heritage"	Don Chaffey	Calvin Clements Jr.	September 9, 1983
26	2	"Heritage"	Don Chaffey	Calvin Clements Jr.	September 9, 1983
While investigating a land scam, Matt finds out a few unnerving things about his family and his past.
27	3	"The Woman in White"	Kim Manners	T : Skip Webster; S/T : Larry Alexander	September 16, 1983
A former peace officer is jailed and under arrest for murder, but he might not have committed the crime.
28	4	"Love You to Death"	Kim Manners	Robert Bielak	September 23, 1983
Matt is the victim of a stalker one-night-stand.
29	5	"The Centerfold Murders"	Kim Manners	Skip Webster	September 30, 1983
Three stunning women have been murdered, their connection: they are all top centerfolds.
30	6	"Needle in a Haystack"	Don Chaffey	Daniel Pyne & Scott Shepherd	October 7, 1983
After witnessing a brutal crime, a diabetic is deported to Mexico, and his mother is concerned about his condition.
31	7	"Marilyn"	Barbara Peeters	Robert Brennan	October 21, 1983
As he lay dying from a fatal gunshot, an associate asks Matt to protect Marilyn. Only one problem: Matt has no idea who she is.
32	8	"The Ghost of Carter Gault"	James L. Conway	S : Steven Thornley; T : Jud Scott	October 28, 1983
A man trying to expose dirty union tactics is murdered right after asking Matt to take the case.
33	9	"China Doll"	Charlie Picerni	James L. Conway	November 4, 1983
Did Chinese drug smugglers murder C.J.'s former roommate?
34	10	"Butterfly"	James L. Conway	Skip Webster	November 18, 1983
In the attempt to protect her little sister from a child prostitute ring, a teenage call girl is murdered.
35	11	"The Crying Clown"	Charlie Picerni	Daniel Pyne & Scott Shepherd	November 25, 1983
A talented art forger is found murdered, and the clues may rest one of his paintings, which is now missing.
36	12	"The Outsider"	Mike Vejar	Calvin Clements Jr.	December 2, 1983
A self-proclaimed "Psychic" who is involved in a kidnapping scheme targets Matt.
37	13	"Target: Miss World"	Cliff Bole	Robert Brennan	December 23, 1983
A sniper assassin kills an innocent girl to maximize his targeting location.
38	14	"The Monster"	James L. Conway	S : Michael Fisher; T : Daniel Pyne & Scott Shepherd	January 6, 1984
C.J. is left to deal with defending a man who has confessed to killing four teens.
39	15	"Waltz of Death"	Don Chaffey	S : Robert Bielak; S/T : Daniel Pyne & Scott Shepherd	January 13, 1984
Someone thinks a renowned concert pianist is a mad strangler.
40	16	"Houston Is Dead"	Charlie Picerni	Michael Fisher	January 20, 1984
While investigating the death of a nursing home nurse, Matt is shot.
41	17	"Criss-Cross"	Don Chaffey	Stephen Lord	January 27, 1984
A retired Lieutenant Vincent Novelli is charged with stealing cocaine from a police evidence vault upon his return from vacation in Hawaii.
42	18	"The Bikini Murders"	Charlie Picerni	Skip Webster	February 3, 1984
A secretary is murdered after uncovering a plot to blackmail her boss.
43	19	"Death Match"	Don Chaffey	Robert Brennan	February 24, 1984
A serial killer who killed Matt's fiancee in the past reveals that he has struck again.
44	20	"Blood Ties"	William Crain	Daniel Pyne & Scott Shepherd	March 2, 1984
A hospital angel of death targets Matt's father.
45	21	"The Secret Admirer"	Don Chaffey	Calvin Clements Jr.	March 9, 1984
C.J. is stalked by an obsessed admirer who murders her beau.
46	22	"Cash and Carry"	James L. Conway	James L. Conway	March 23, 1984
A thief has second thoughts after stealing a cool $3 million from the mob.
47	23	"On the Run: Part 1"	Cliff Bole	Michael Fisher	March 30, 1984
An amnesiac Matt wakes in his penthouse to discover a month is past and he is accused of murder.

=== Season 3 (1984–85) ===
No. overall	No. in season	Title	Directed by	Written by	Original release date
48	1	"Wanted Man: Part 2"	James L. Conway	Michael Fisher	September 21, 1984
Buddy Ebsen stars as Roy Houston, Matt's uncle who investigates the accusations against his nephew and uncovers a mind control plot.
49	2	"Vanished"	Don Chaffey	Michael Fisher	September 28, 1984
Hoyt's young daughter is kidnapped by a child molester.
50	3	"Eyewitness"	Charlie Picerni	Ann Lewis Hamilton	October 12, 1984
A TV newsman covers a kidnapping that he might be involved in to boost ratings.
51	4	"Apostle of Death"	Kim Manners	Skip Webster	October 19, 1984
Whether it's a religious cult or a commune, Matt must rescue Peggy Allyson (Wendy Smith Howard) who is being bilked out of a $3 million inheritance by evangelist leader Jesse Mercer (Richard Lynch) who plans to murder her after he has gained control of the cash.
52	5	"Caged"	Cliff Bole	William T. Conway	October 26, 1984
After getting amnesia after a car accident, C.J. finds herself in prison and uncovers a prostitution ring. Guest starring Cynthia Cypert as Cynthia.
53	6	"Return to Nam: Part 1"	James L. Conway	Daniel Pyne & Scott Shepherd	November 2, 1984
Matt discovers that his cousin, who was once believed dead in Cambodia, is still a POW.
54	7	"Escape from Nam: Part 2"	James L. Conway	Daniel Pyne & Scott Shepherd	November 9, 1984
The Cambodian warlord who has imprisoned Matt's cousin might be getting a little help from someone close to Matt.
55	8	"The High Fashion Murders"	Cliff Bole	James L. Conway	November 16, 1984
Two models have been murdered, and Matt can't accept the alibi of the most likely suspect.
56	9	"Death Stalk"	Mike Vejar	Robert Brennan	November 23, 1984
An international assassin has a grudge against Matt.
57	10	"Blood Money"	Don Chaffey	Stephen Lord	November 30, 1984
Matt is dragged into a case involving international gem smuggling from a war-torn Vietnam. Guest-starring Scott Marlowe.
58	11	"Deadly Games"	Charlie Picerni	S : David Florimbi; T : Daniel Pyne & Scott Shepherd	December 7, 1984
The most dangerous game is revisited when a sporting goods mogul hunts athletes.
59	12	"Stolen"	Cliff Bole	Margie Gordon	December 21, 1984
An actress, whose infant son had been kidnapped a year earlier, asks Matt to investigate a woman she saw in a park with a child who resembled her lost baby.
60	13	"The Nightmare Man"	Kim Manners	S : Michael Fisher; T : Daniel Pyne	January 4, 1985
Matt believes that the man who abducted him as a boy is kidnapping again.
61	14	"Breakpoint"	Peter Crane	Robert Brennan	January 11, 1985
Matt and Roy rush to the aid of Roy's son (and Matt's cousin), a Vietnam vet who is threatening suicide.
62	15	"Death Trap"	Kim Manners	Richard Fisher	January 11, 1985
A once-prosperous oil town is now home to corruption and embezzlement.
63	16	"The Honeymoon Murders"	Charlie Picerni	Steven Whitney	January 25, 1985
Someone is targeting brides-to-be.
64	17	"The Beach Club Murders"	Cliff Bole	William T. Conway	February 1, 1985
Matt investigates blackmail murders with the assistance of one of the victim's sisters.
65	18	"New Orleans Nightmare"	Mike Robe	Mike Robe	February 8, 1985
A stewardess accidentally happens upon and photographs a murder and asks Matt to protect her.
66	19	"Company Secrets"	Charlie Picerni	S : Thomas G. Edwards; T : Scott Shepherd	February 15, 1985
Roy fakes his death to uncover a plot to murder his CIA squad members.
67	20	"Killing Time"	Mike Vejar	Daniel Pyne	February 22, 1985
Matt's new flame has a family secret; her brother is funding Irish terrorists.
68	21	"Death Watch"	William Crain	Robert Earll	March 15, 1985
Matt and company investigate a drug ring.
69	22	"Final Vows"	James L. Conway	Skip Webster	March 29, 1985
Elizabeth, the object of Matt's affections, returns.

== Home media ==
On March 9, 2010, CBS DVD (Distributed by Paramount) released season 1 of Matt Houston on DVD in Region 1 for the first time. Season 2 was released June 16, 2017 and Season 3 was released on July 21, 2017.

On May 4, 2015, it was announced that all three seasons of Matt Houston would be released the summer of 2015 by VEI, Inc. The date was pushed back and the set was later released on July 15, 2016.

DVD name	Ep #	Region 1
The Complete First Season	24	March 9, 2010
The Complete Second Season	23	June 16, 2017
The Complete Third Season	22	July 21, 2017
The Complete Series	69	July 15, 2016

== Award nominations ==
Year	Award	Result	Category	Recipient
1983	Emmy Award	Nominated	Outstanding Film Editing for a Series	Bob Bring (For episode "The Showgirl Murders")
1983	Edgar Award	Nominated	Best Television Episode	Richard Christian Danus and Ken Trevey (For episode "Matt Houston")
1985	Young Artist Award	Nominated	Best Young Actor – Guest in a Television Series	Bumper Robinson
