= I Was a Mail Order Bride =

- Genre: Comedy; Romance
- Written by: Stephen Zito
- Directed by: Marvin J. Chomsky
- Starring: Valerie Bertinelli; Ted Wass
- Music by: John Addison
- Country of origin: United States
- Original language: English

Production
- Executive producers: Jack Grossbart; Marty Litke
- Producers: Andrew Hill; Michael Jaffe; Ervin Zavada
- Cinematography: Donald H. Birnkrant
- Editor: James T. Heckert
- Running time: 92 minutes
- Production companies: Jaffe Productions; MGM Television; Tuxedo Ltd Productions

Original release
- Network: CBS
- Release: December 14, 1982

I Was a Mail Order Bride is a 1982 American made-for-television romantic comedy film directed by Marvin J. Chomsky and starring Valerie Bertinelli and Ted Wass.

== Plot ==
Kate Tosconi is a journalist in her early 20s working in Chicago for a women's magazine called Contemporary Woman Magazine. Having a special interest for trains, she is enthusiastic to do an article on rail transport. However, her boss Dottie Birmington only allows her to do the piece if she also does an article on mail-order brides. She reluctantly places an advertisement, which is responded by Robert Fitzgerald.

Robert is a successful business man in L.A. who constantly competes with his business partner Joe Kimbel. For his latest bet, Robert is challenged to take in a mail-order bride and not have sex with her for two weeks. Soon, Kate packs her bags and travels to Los Angeles, where she takes an immediate interest in Robert. She notices that he is a nice guy and feels guilty about using him for an article. They eventually fall in love with each other and Kate cancels the article.

While drunk one night, Robert is taken home by Kate. She attempts to seduce him, but he falls asleep. The next day, she jokes about having had sex with him. Robert, thinking he has lost the bet, admits to the whole truth. Kate is furious about having been a part of a bet and refuses to believe his claims that he has fallen in love with her in the meantime. She immediately returns home and writes an offensive article on Robert. When he reads the article, he is outraged and sues her for libel.

In court, they are initially mad at each other, but they soon realize they still love each other. Robert wins the case, after which Kate has to give him a written apology. After doing this, she returns home. Robert, however, is encouraged by Kate's father to go after her and he is able to climb on the train. In the end, they kiss each other.

== Cast ==
- Valerie Bertinelli as Katarina "Kate" Tosconi
- Ted Wass as Robert Fitzgerald
- Kenneth Kimmins as Joe Kimbel
- Karen Morrow as Eve Whister
- Holland Taylor as Dottie Birmington
- Sam Wanamaker as Frank Tosconi
- Jack Collins as Archibald Trucker
- Jason Bernard as Judge
- Judith Baldwin as Rita Kimbel

== Reception ==
Reviewer Fred Rothenberg wrote that the film was "a standard television vehicle" and "totally implausable, halfway diverting". He furthermore complained about Wass and Bertinelli's character's "charade reminiscent in style, but not substance", and continued: "The premise is weak but has enough fluffy charm to sustain early attention. It's never an intelligent farce, though, opting for pie-in-the-face philosophy rather than cleverness. [..] One major problem of the film is that this unconventional farce too quickly forgets the building relationship for the dissolving one." Nevertheless, the movie was the ninth-most viewed prime time show in the United States for the week of its release.
