= Alan Hale Jr. =

American actor (1921–1990)

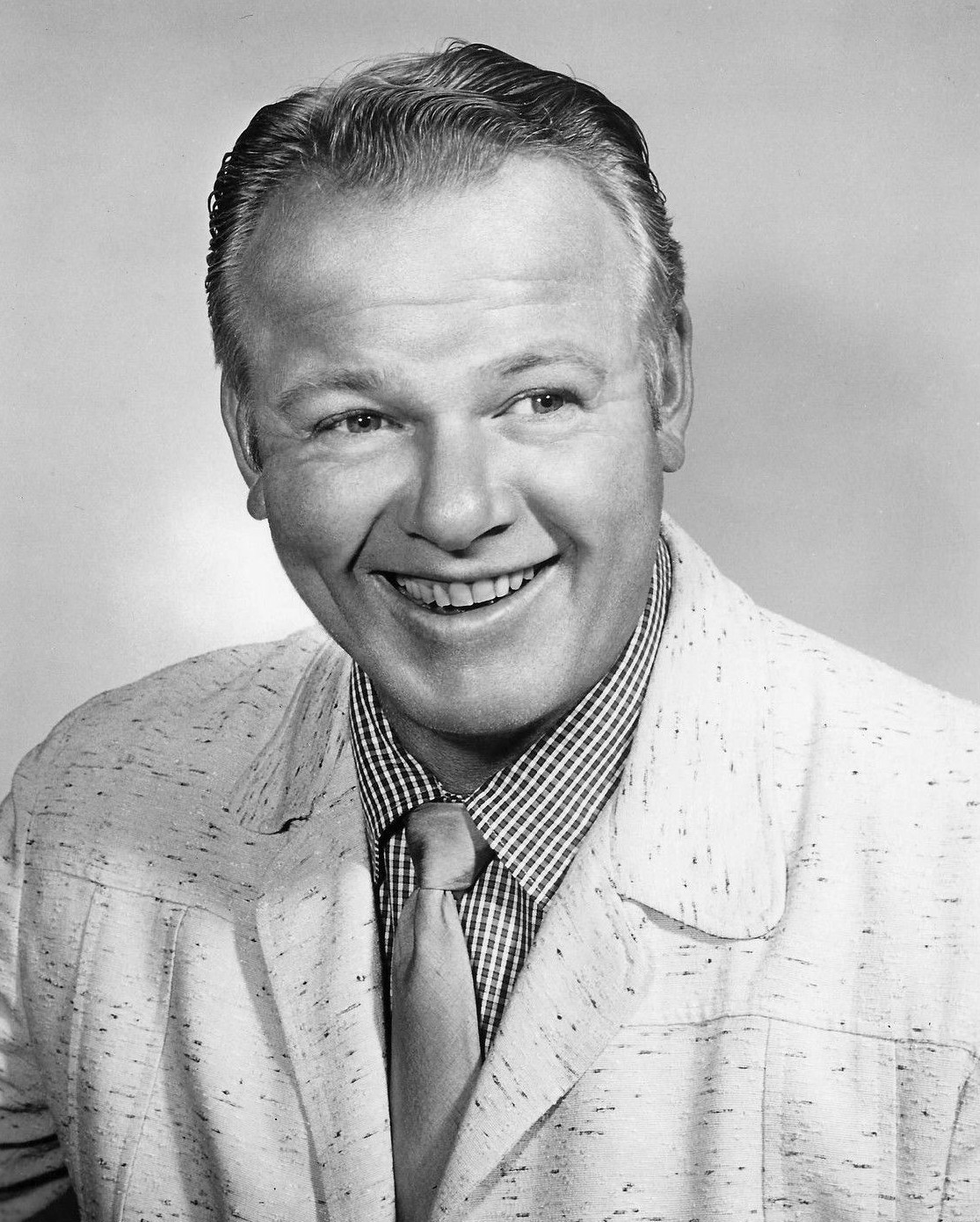
- Hale in 1959
- Born: Alan Hale MacKahan; March 8, 1921; Los Angeles, California, U.S.
- Died: January 2, 1990 (aged 68); Los Angeles, California, U.S.
- Occupations: Actor; restaurateur
- Years active: 1931–1988
- Known for: Gilligan's Island as Captain Jonas Grumby (The Skipper); Casey Jones; Rescue from Gilligan's Island; The Castaways on Gilligan's Island; The Harlem Globetrotters on Gilligan's Island
- Military Service
- Allegiance: United States
- Branch: United States Coast Guard
- Service years: 1942–1945
- Rank: Seaman
- Conflicts: World War II
- Spouses: Bettina Reed Doerr (m. 1943; div. 1963); Naomi Grace Ingram (m. 1964)
- Children: 4
- Parents: Alan Hale Sr. (father); Gretchen Hartman (mother)

Alan Hale Jr. (born Alan Hale MacKahan; March 8, 1921 – January 2, 1990) was an American actor and restaurateur. He was the son of actor Alan Hale Sr. His television career spanned four decades, but he was most notable for his secondary lead role as Captain Jonas Grumby, better known as The Skipper, on the 1960s CBS comedy series Gilligan's Island (1964–1967), a role he reprised in three Gilligan's Island television films and two spin-off cartoon series.

Hale appeared in more than 200 films and television roles from 1941. He appeared primarily in Westerns, portraying the Sundance Kid in The Three Outlaws (1956) opposite Neville Brand as Butch Cassidy, performing with Kirk Douglas in The Big Trees (1952), Audie Murphy in Destry (1954), Ray Milland in A Man Alone (1955), Robert Wagner in The True Story of Jesse James (1957), and Hugh Marlowe in The Long Rope (1961). He also appeared in musical comedies opposite Don DeFore in It Happened on Fifth Avenue (1947), James Cagney in The West Point Story (1950), and Judy Canova in Honeychile (1951). He also appeared on several talk and variety shows.

== Early life ==
Alan Hale MacKahan was born in Los Angeles, California. His father was character actor Rufus Edward MacKahan (1892–1950), who used the stage name Alan Hale, and his mother was silent film actress Gretchen Hartman (1897–1979). His father appeared in more than 235 films and had a successful screen career, both as a leading man in silent films and as a supporting actor in sound movies. Hale Jr. was in the silent movies as a baby.

Hale served in the United States Coast Guard during World War II. He dropped the "Junior" from his name after his father died in 1950.

== Career ==
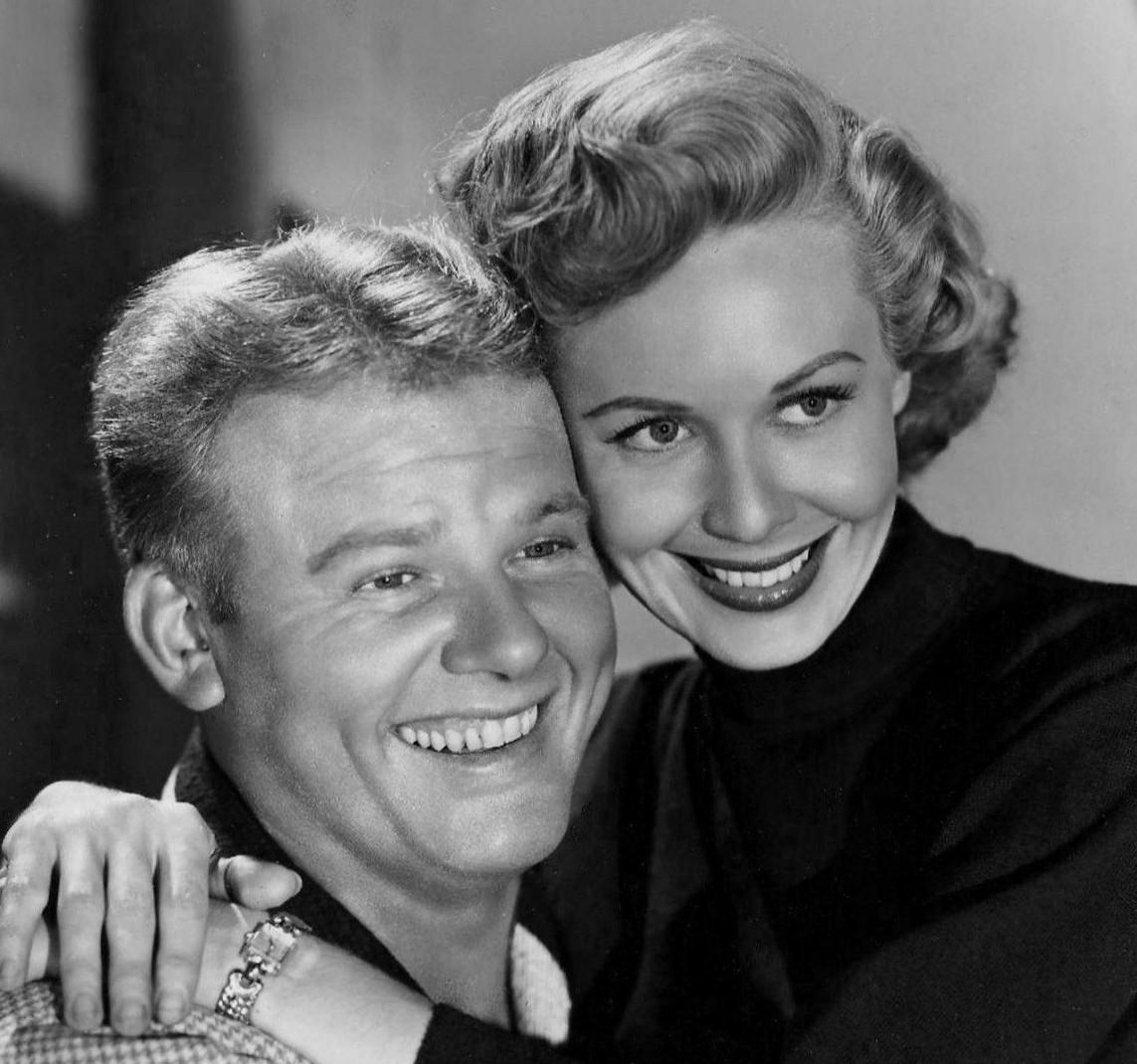
Hale with Randy Stuart on Biff Baker, U.S.A. (1952)

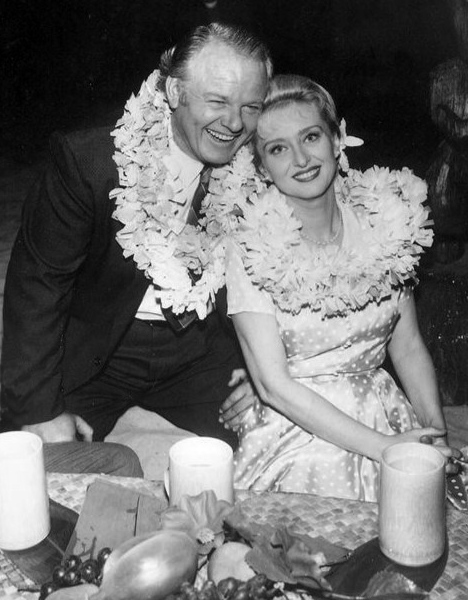
Hale and Celeste Holm in Follow the Sun (1961)

In 1931, Hale made his Broadway stage debut in Caught Wet. The play opened on November 4 and closed later that month. He made his screen debut in Wild Boys of the Road which was released in 1933. Although his role was deleted from that film's final release, he still received screen credit for his performance. He later appeared in roles in To the Shores of Tripoli (1942), Yanks Ahoy (1943), Sweetheart of Sigma Chi (1946), and When Willie Comes Marching Home (1950). During the late 1940s and early 1950s, he frequently appeared in Gene Autry films and also had a recurring role from 1950 to 1952 on The Gene Autry Show.

By the early 1950s, Hale began to work in television. In 1952, he landed the starring role in CBS's Biff Baker, U.S.A. The series was canceled in 1954. He continued his career on the small screen by appearing in guest spots on a variety of other series, such as The Range Rider (five times), Annie Oakley, Fireside Theater, Frontier, Matinee Theater, Fury, Northwest Passage, and The Man from Blackhawk.

The year 1957 proved to be an especially busy one for Hale on television series. In addition to performing the role of Shawnee Bill on the Western Wanted Dead or Alive, he played a folksy rancher, Les Bridgeman, in "Hired Gun", an episode of the ABC/Warner Brothers series Cheyenne. Later that year Hale landed another starring role in the syndicated television series Casey Jones, which lasted for thirty-two half-hour episodes before its cancellation in 1958. Then, from 1958 to 1960, he was cast in a recurring role on Rory Calhoun's CBS Western The Texan. Hale also returned to the series Cheyenne in 1960 to portray the character Tuk in the episode "Road to Three Graves".

Throughout the early 1960s, Hale continued in guest-starring roles on episodes of Gunsmoke, Bonanza, Rawhide, The Real McCoys, Mister Ed, Green Acres, Assignment: Underwater, Hawaiian Eye, Adventures in Paradise, Lock Up, The Andy Griffith Show, Lassie, Tales of Wells Fargo, Route 66 and two episodes of Hazel. He was featured in two episodes of Perry Mason, first as murderer Lon Snyder in the 1961 episode "The Case of the Unwelcome Bride", and then in 1963 as Nelson Barclift in "The Case of the Bouncing Boomerang".

Despite his growing commitment to roles on television, Hale throughout the 1950s and into the 1960s continued his work in supporting roles in feature films. Some of those include The Gunfighter (1950) with Gregory Peck, At Sword's Point (1952) with Cornel Wilde and Maureen O'Hara, The Man Behind the Gun (1953) with Randolph Scott, Silver Lode (1954) with John Payne and Dan Duryea, The Sea Chase (1955) with John Wayne and Lana Turner, The Three Outlaws (1956) with Neville Brand as Butch Cassidy and Hale as the Sundance Kid, The True Story of Jesse James (1957) with Robert Wagner as Jesse James and Jeffrey Hunter as Frank James, Up Periscope (1959) with James Garner and Edmond O'Brien, Thunder in Carolina with Rory Calhoun (1960), The Long Rope with Hugh Marlowe (1961), Bullet for a Badman (1964) with Audie Murphy and Darren McGavin, Advance to the Rear (1964) with Glenn Ford and Stella Stevens, and Hang 'Em High (1968) with Clint Eastwood.

=== Gilligan's Island ===
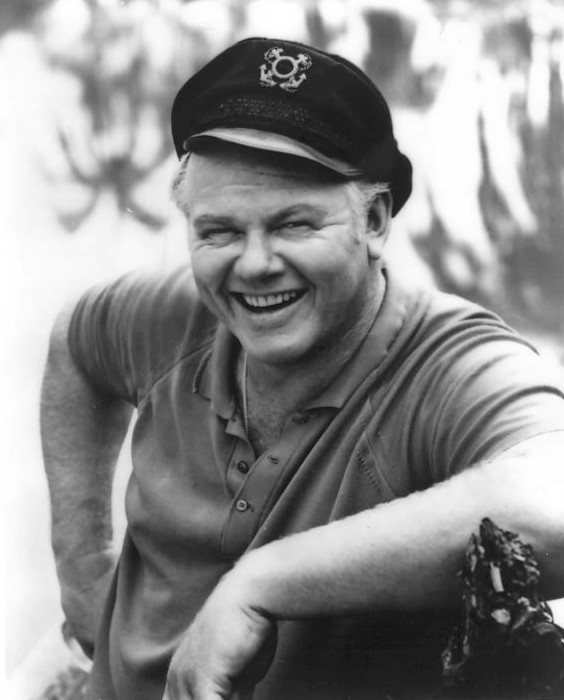
Hale as the Skipper on Gilligan's Island (1964–1967)

In 1964, Hale won the co-starring role as the Skipper on the CBS sitcom Gilligan's Island. The series aired for a total of 98 episodes from 1964 to 1967. His character proved to be the most prominent role of Hale's career as the series continued in reruns. The popularity of the show typecast its actors, making it difficult for them to successfully pursue different roles. Hale didn’t mind being so closely identified with the Skipper. According to series creator Sherwood Schwartz, he often visited children in hospitals dressed as the Skipper.

Hale reprised the role of the Skipper in three television films, Rescue from Gilligan's Island (1978), The Castaways on Gilligan's Island (1979) and The Harlem Globetrotters on Gilligan's Island (1981). He also voiced the Skipper in two cartoon versions of the series, The New Adventures of Gilligan from 1974 to 1977 and Gilligan's Planet from 1982 to 1983. In 1987, Hale appeared as the Skipper in two unrelated sitcoms The New Gidget with his childhood friend and classmate William Schallert and former co-star Bob Denver and an episode of ALF with several former cast members. Also in 1987, Hale played a Skipper look-a-like taxi cab driver named J. Grumby on Growing Pains. He also promoted Gilligan's Island reruns on TBS alongside Bob Denver. Denver and Hale also appeared as their characters at various promotional events.

=== Later years ===
After the end of Gilligan's Island, Hale continued his career in television. He guest-starred on several more series, including The Wild Wild West, Here Come the Brides, Batman, Land of the Giants, The Virginian, Here's Lucy, Marcus Welby, M.D., The Paul Lynde Show, The Love Boat, Crazy Like a Fox and Murder, She Wrote.

Hale performed in additional feature films during the 1970s and the 1980s. He starred in The Giant Spider Invasion (1975) and Angels Revenge (1978). In 1983, Hale co-starred in comedy-drama film Hambone and Hillie, starring Lillian Gish. The following year, he had a role in the comedy Johnny Dangerously and became a spokesman for a car dealership in Victoria, British Columbia. In 1987, Hale starred in the horror film Terror Night. Later that same year, he made his final film appearance in a cameo role with Bob Denver in Back to the Beach.

=== Other ventures ===
In addition to acting, Hale co-owned Alan Hale's Lobster Barrel, a restaurant he opened in the mid-1970s. The Lobster Barrel was located on La Cienega Boulevard along Los Angeles’ Restaurant Row. According to Hale's agent, he was "phased out" of the business in 1982 and later opened Alan Hale's Quality and Leisure Travel office.

== Personal life ==
Hale was married twice; his first marriage was on March 12, 1943, in Hollywood to Bettina Reed Doerr, with whom he had four children: Alan Brian, Chris, Lana, and Dorian. The couple later divorced. In 1964, Hale married former singer Naomi Grace Ingram, to whom he remained married until his death.

== Death and legacy ==
Hale died on January 2, 1990 of thymus cancer at St. Vincent Medical Center in Los Angeles at age 68. His body was cremated and his ashes were sprinkled into the Pacific Ocean. His Gilligan's Island co-star Dawn Wells was in attendance, representing the surviving members of the cast.

For his contribution to the television industry, Alan Hale Jr. has a star on the Hollywood Walk of Fame located at 6653 Hollywood Boulevard.

== Stage career ==
Date	Production	Role
1931	Caught Wet	Brewster
1934–1935	Small Miracle	George Nelson
1935	Ceiling Zero	Tay Lawson
1937	Red Harvest	Private Breen
1940	The Scene of the Crime	Bob Hanley
1952	Hook n' Ladder	Mr. Gilkens

== Selected filmography ==
Year	Title	Role	Notes
1933	Wild Boys of the Road	One of the Boys	Uncredited
1941	I Wanted Wings	Cadet	Uncredited
1941	Dive Bomber	Pilot Trainee	Uncredited
1941	All-American Co-Ed	Tiny	
1942	To the Shores of Tripoli	Tom Hall	
1942	Eagle Squadron	Olsen	
1942	Rubber Racketeers	Red	
1943	No Time for Love	Union Checker	Uncredited
1943	Watch on the Rhine	Boy	Uncredited
1946	Monsieur Beaucaire	Courtier	Uncredited
1946	Sweetheart of Sigma Chi	Mike Mitchell	
1947	It Happened on Fifth Avenue	Whitey Temple	
1947	The Spirit of West Point	Oklahoma Cutter	
1948	Homecoming	Military Policeman	Uncredited
1948	One Sunday Afternoon	Marty	
1949	It Happens Every Spring	Schmidt	
1949	Rim of the Canyon	Matt Kimbrough	
1950	The Blazing Sun	Ben Luber	
1950	The Gunfighter	Eddie's Brother	Uncredited
1950	Kill the Umpire	Harry Shea	Uncredited
1950	The Underworld Story	Shaeffer, Durham Warehouse Thug	
1950	The West Point Story	Bull Gilbert	
1951	Home Town Story	Slim Haskins	
1951	Honeychile	Joe Boyd	
1952	Arctic Flight	John W. Wetherby	
1952	The Big Trees	Tiny	
1952	Springfield Rifle	Mizzell	
1952	At Sword's Point	Porthos Jr.	
1952	Wait till the Sun Shines, Nellie	George Oliphant	
1953	The Man Behind the Gun	Cpl. Olaf Swenson	
1953	Trail Blazers	Roger Stone	
1953	Captain John Smith and Pocahontas	Fleming	
1954	Captain Kidd and the Slave Girl	Jay Simpson	
1954	Rogue Cop	Johnny Stark	
1954	Destry	Jack Larson	
1954	Young at Heart	Robert Neary	
1955	The Sea Chase	Wentz	
1955	A Man Alone	Acting Sheriff Jim Anderson	
1955	The Indian Fighter	Will Crabtree	
1956	The Killer Is Loose	Denny	
1956	The Cruel Tower	Rocky Milliken	
1956	The Three Outlaws	Sundance Kid	
1957	Battle Hymn	Mess Sergeant	
1957	The True Story of Jesse James	Cole Younger	
1957	All Mine to Give	Tom Cullen	
1958	The Lady Takes a Flyer	Frank Henshaw	
1959	Up Periscope	Lt. Pat Malone	
1960	Thunder in Carolina	Buddy Schaeffer	
1962	The Iron Maiden	Paul Fisher	
1963	The Crawling Hand	Sheriff Townsend	
1964	Advance to the Rear	Sgt. Beauregard Davis	
1964	Bullet for a Badman	Leach	Alternative title: Renegade Posse
1968	Hang 'Em High	Matt Stone, Cooper Hanging Party	
1970	Tiger by the Tail	Billy Jack Whitehorn	
1970	There Was a Crooked Man...	Tobaccy	
1975	The Giant Spider Invasion	Sheriff Jones	
1979	The North Avenue Irregulars	Harry, the Hat	
1979	Angels Brigade	Manny	Alternative titles: Angels Revenge; Seven from Heaven
1979	The Fifth Musketeer	Porthos	
1983	Hambone and Hillie	McVickers	
1984	The Red Fury	Doc Kaminsky	
1984	Johnny Dangerously	Desk Sergeant	
1987	Terror Night	Jake Nelson	Alternative title: Bloody Movie
1987	Back to the Beach	Bartender's Buddy	

Television
Year	Title	Role	Notes
1950–1952	The Gene Autry Show	Tiny – Sidekick	9 episodes
1953	Man Against Crime	Lt. Olmstead	Episode: "Hide and Seek"
1952–1954	Biff Baker, U.S.A.	Biff Baker	26 episodes
1955	Public Defender	Sparky Albright	Segment: "The Hitchhiker"
1955	Stage 7	Herb 'Bad News' Loftus	Episode: "The Traveling Salesman"
1955	Navy Log	Beartracks	Episode: "The Pollywog of Yosu"
1956	The Red Skelton Show	Muldoon	Episode: "Cookie Returns"
1956	Screen Directors Playhouse	Bowen	Episode: "A Ticket for Thaddeus"
1957	The Millionaire	Bill "Buffalo" Walker	Episode: "The Professor Amberson Adams Story"
1957	The Alcoa Hour	Red Regan	Episode: "The Animal Kingdom"
1957	Cheyenne	Les Bridgeman	Episode: "Hired Gun"
1957–1958	Casey Jones	Casey Jones	32 episodes
1958	Northwest Passage	Sam Beal	Episode: "The Red Coat"
1958	Wanted: Dead or Alive	Bill Poe	Episode: "Passing of Shawnee Bill"
1958–1960	The Texan	Sculley	6 episodes
1959	Bat Masterson	Bailey Harper	Episode: "A Personal Matter"
1959	Colt 45	Sam Bass	Episode: "The Saga of Sam Bass"
1959	Bonanza	Swede Lundberg	Episode: "The Saga of Annie O'Toole"
1959	The Restless Gun	Sheriff Clarke	Episode "Incident at Bluefield"
1959	The Untouchables	Big Bill Phillips	Episode: "Tri-State Gang"
1960	The Alaskans	Hap Johnson	Episode: "Partners"
1960	Shotgun Slade	Sheriff Sloan	Episode: "Lost Gold"
1960	Maverick	Captain Jim (US Marshal)	Episode: "Arizona Black Maria"
1960	Cheyenne	Tuk	Episode: "Road to Three Graves"
1961	The Jack Benny Program	McGuire	Episode: "Jack Goes to Gym"
1961	The Real McCoys	Harry Keller	Episode: "Season 5 Ep 2: The Trailer Camp"
1961	Hawaiian Eye	Big Mac McConnel	Episode: "Dragon Road"
1961	Adventures in Paradise	Captain Arthur Butcher	2 episodes, "Captain Butcher" and "The Serpent in the Garden"
1961	Gunsmoke	Jake Higgins	Episode: "Minnie"
1961	Rawhide	Lucas	Episode: "The Woman Trap"
1961	Perry Mason	Lon Snyder	Episode: "The Case of the Unwelcome Bride"
1962	The Andy Griffith Show	Jeff Pruitt	Episode: "The Farmer Takes a Wife"
1962	Wagon Train	Kirby	Episode: "The Lonnie Fallon Story"
1962	Follow the Sun	Charlie	Episode: "The Irresistible Miss Bullfinch"
1962	Maverick	Big Jim Watson (as Alan Hale)	Episode: "The Troubled Heir"
1963	77 Sunset Strip	Baxter	Episode: "Tarnished Idol"
1963	Laramie	Roger Canby	Episode: "Edge of Evil"
1963	Empire	Fletcher	Episode: "The Convention"
1963	Hazel	Coach Murphy	Episode: "Hazel Scores a Touchdown" (credited as Alan Hale)
1963	The Lucy Show	Fire Academy instructor	Episode: "Lucy Puts Out a Fire at the Bank"
1963	Perry Mason	Nelson Barclift	Episode: "The Case of the Bouncing Boomerang"
1964	The New Phil Silvers Show	Charlie	Episode: "Pay the Two Dollars"
1964	My Favorite Martian	Omar M. Keck	Episode: "The Disastro-Nauts"
1964–1967	Gilligan's Island	Jonas Grumby (The Skipper)	98 episodes
1966	Gunsmoke	Bull Bannock	Episode: "Champion of the World"
1967	Batman	Gilligan	Episode: "The Ogg and I"; Uncredited
1967	Hondo	Ben Cobb	Episode: "Hondo and the Death Drive"
1968	The Wild Wild West	Ned Brown	Episode: "The Night of The Sabatini Death"
1968	Daktari	Big Joe Wonder	Episode: "African Showdown"
1969	Green Acres	Sheriff	Episode: "A Prize in Every Package"
1969	The Flying Nun	Uncle Reggie Overton Perkins	2 episodes
1969	The Good Guys	Big Tom	3 episodes
1970	The Andersonville Trial	The Board of Military Judges	Television movie
1970	Here's Lucy	Moose Manley	Episode: "Lucy and Wally Cox"
1970	Ironside	Laurence Drescher	Episode: "The People Against Judge McIntire"
1971	Alias Smith and Jones	Andrew J. Greer	Episode: "The Girl in Boxcar #3"
1971	The Doris Day Show	Charlie Dinser	Episode: "Have I Got a Fellow for You!"
1971	O'Hara, U.S. Treasury	Mr. Tidwell	Episode: "Operation: Moonshine"
1972	Gunsmoke	Dave Chaney	Episode: "Jubilee"
1973	McMillan & Wife	Port Captain	Episode: "The Fine Art of Staying Alive"
1974–1975	The New Adventures of Gilligan	The Skipper (Voice)	24 episodes
1975	The Wonderful World of Disney	Cholly	2-part episode: The Sky's the Limit
1978	Rescue from Gilligan's Island	The Skipper	Television movie
1979	$weepstake$		Episode: "Vince, Pete and Patsy, Jessica and Rodney"
1979	The Castaways on Gilligan's Island	The Skipper	Television movie
1979	ABC Weekend Special	Mayor	Episode: "The Revenge of Red Chief"
1979	The Littlest Hobo	Harry	Episode: "Stand-in"
1979	The Love Boat	Jack Tigue	Episode: "The Harder They Fall"
1980	Fantasy Island	Judge Winston	Episode: "Rogues to Riches/Stark Terror"
1981	The Harlem Globetrotters on Gilligan's Island	The Skipper	Television movie
1982	The Love Boat	Gus Dolan	Episode: "Meet the Author"
1982–1983	Gilligan's Planet	The Skipper (Voice)	13 episodes
1983	Matt Houston	Rawson Harmon IV	Episode: "The Yacht Club Murders"
1986	Murder, She Wrote	Fenton Harris	Episode: "Trial by Error"
1986	Magnum, P.I.	Russell Tate	Episode: "All Thieves on Deck"
1987	Simon & Simon	Silk McNabb	Episode: "For Old Crime's Sake"
1987	ALF	Skipper Jonas Grumby	Episode: "Somewhere Over the Rerun"
1987	Growing Pains	The Cabbie	Episode: "This Is Your Life"
1988	The Law & Harry McGraw	Herb Loftus	Episode: "Gilhooey's Is History"
