= Natalie Schafer =

American actress (1900–1991)

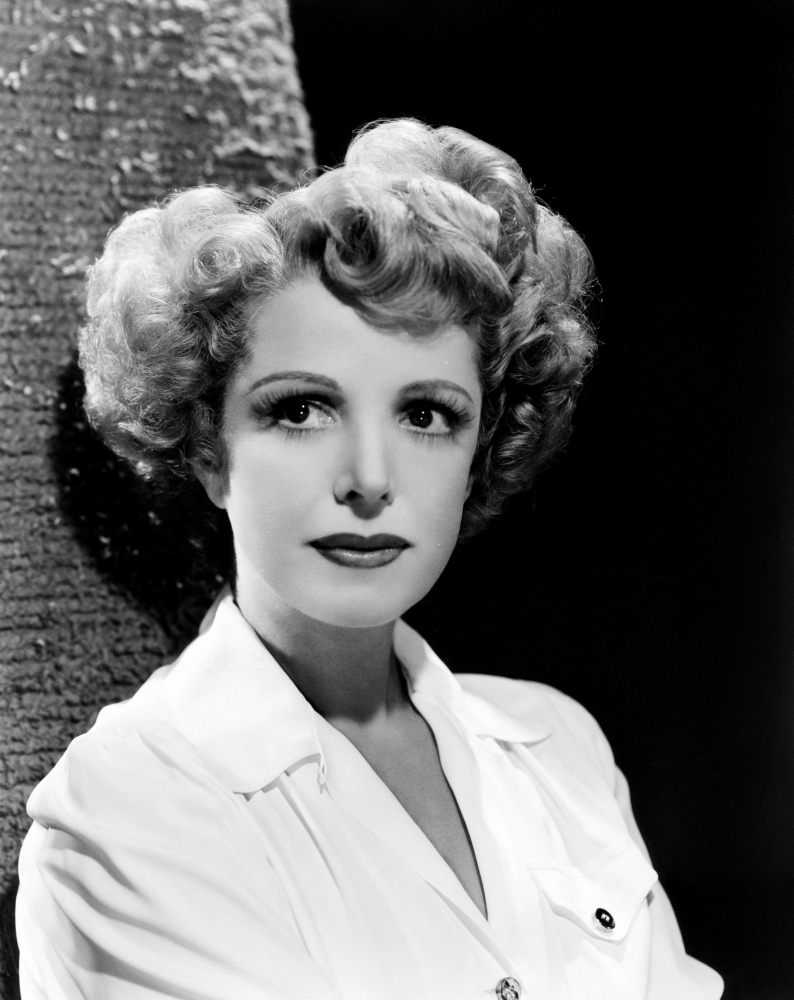
- Schafer in 1942
- Born: November 5, 1900; Red Bank, New Jersey
- Died: April 10, 1991 (aged 90); Beverly Hills, California
- Occupation: Actress
- Years active: 1927–1990
- Known for: Gilligan's Island; Rescue from Gilligan's Island; The Castaways on Gilligan's Island; The Harlem Globetrotters on Gilligan's Island
- Spouse: Louis Calhern (m. 1933; div. 1942)
- Partner: Maurice Hill

Natalie Schafer (November 5, 1900 – April 10, 1991) was an American actress, best known today for her role as Lovey Howell on the sitcom Gilligan's Island (1964–1967).

== Early life and career ==
Natalie Schafer was born on November 5, 1900, in Red Bank, New Jersey. the eldest of the three children of Jennie (née Tim; family name originally Tein) and Charles Emanual Schafer, both of German descent.

Schafer began her career as an actress on Broadway before moving to Los Angeles in 1941 to work in films. She appeared on Broadway in 17 plays between 1927 and 1959, often playing supporting roles. Most of those appearances were in short-run plays, with the exceptions of Lady in the Dark (1941–42), The Doughgirls (1942–44), and Romanoff and Juliet (1957–58). She was seen in a revival of Six Characters in Search of an Author, directed by Sir Tyrone Guthrie (1955–56). She also appeared in stock and regional productions, including the off-Broadway production The Killing of Sister George with Claire Trevor in the title role. She also guest-starred in TV productions beginning in the 1950s, such as an episode (“The Shy Ballerina”) of Sherlock Holmes, and in "The Charm School" episode of I Love Lucy, both in 1954.

Schafer performed in many films, usually portraying sophisticates. On TV, her roles included "Lovey Howell" on Gilligan's Island from 1964–67. She reprised her role in three made-for-television spin-off films after the show ended: Rescue from Gilligan's Island (1978), The Castaways on Gilligan's Island (1979), and The Harlem Globetrotters on Gilligan's Island (1981). She also voiced Lovey Howell on the animated spinoffs, The New Adventures of Gilligan from 1974–77 and Gilligan's Planet from 1982–83.

In 1969, Schafer appeared in The Survivors—a high-profile prime time soap opera aired by the ABC television network. Despite the presence of movie stars like Lana Turner, Kevin McCarthy and George Hamilton, the show was a ratings failure and lasted only one season. For the 1971–1972 television season, Schafer joined the cast of the CBS daytime serial, Search for Tomorrow, portraying Helen Collins, mother of Wade and Clay Collins. Immediately following that role, she played Augusta Roulland on another daytime soap, Love of Life. Her final performance was in the 1990 made-for-television horror film I'm Dangerous Tonight.

She guest-starred as well on many other television series, including Goodyear Playhouse/Philco Playhouse ("The Sisters", with Grace Kelly, 1951), I Love Lucy (1954), Producers' Showcase ("The Petrified Forest", 1955), Guestward, Ho! (1960), Thriller (American TV series) (1961), The Beverly Hillbillies (1964), Mayberry RFD (1970), Mannix (1972), The Brady Bunch (1974), Phyllis (1976), Three's Company (1978), and The Love Boat (1979).

== Personal life ==
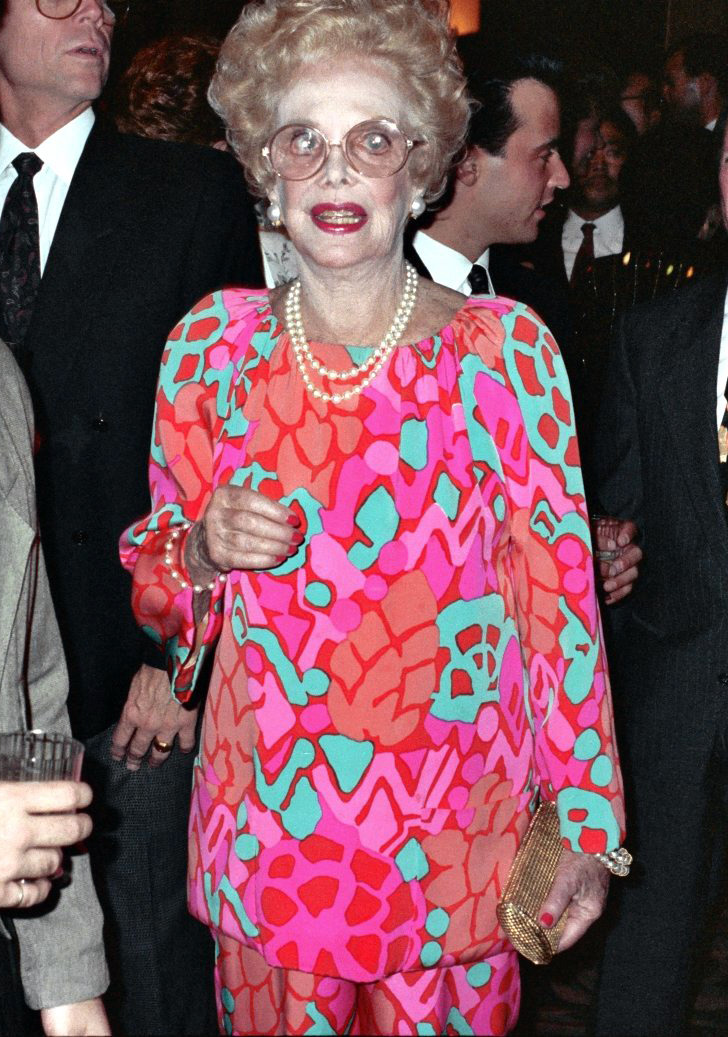
Schafer in September 1990

Schafer was married to actor Louis Calhern from 1933 to 1942; they had no children. Schafer and Calhern appeared together in the 1956 film Forever, Darling.

Schafer was secretive about her age. She reportedly never revealed her true year of birth to her husband during their marriage. For many years, her birth year was generally given as 1912. Few people believed this; yet her actual year of birth of 1900 (which was not discovered until after her death) surprised even her intimate friends. She was reportedly also a breast cancer survivor, a fact she withheld from her fans and friends.

At the time of her death, a family spokesman stated that Schafer's survivors included her longtime companion Maurice Hill.

== Death ==
Schafer died of liver cancer in her Beverly Hills home at the age of 90. She was cremated; her ashes were scattered into the Pacific Ocean, off San Pedro's Point Fermin Light. She bequeathed between $1.5 million and $2 million to the Lillian Booth Actors Home to renovate the hospital's outpatient wing, which was renamed the Natalie Schafer Wing in 1993.

== Partial filmography ==
- The Body Disappears (1941) – Mrs. Lunceford
- Reunion in France (1942) – Frau Amy Schroder
- Marriage Is a Private Affair (1944) – Mrs. Irene Selworth
- Keep Your Powder Dry (1945) – Harriet Corwin
- Molly and Me (1945) – Kitty Goode-Burroughs
- Wonder Man (1945) – Mrs. Hume
- Masquerade in Mexico (1945) – Irene Denny
- The Other Love (1947) – Dora Shelton
- Dishonored Lady (1947) – Ethel Royce
- Repeat Performance (1947) – Eloise Shaw
- Secret Beyond the Door (1947) – Edith Potter
- The Time of Your Life (1948) – Society Lady
- The Snake Pit (1948) – Mrs. Stuart
- Caught (1949) – Dorothy Dale
- Payment on Demand (1951) – Mrs. Edna Blanton
- Take Care of My Little Girl (1951) – Mother Cookie Clark
- The Law and the Lady (1951) – Pamela Pemberson
- Callaway Went Thataway (1951) – Martha Lorrison
- Just Across the Street (1952) – Gertrude Medford
- The Girl Next Door (1953) – Evelyn the maid
- Casanova's Big Night (1954) – Signora Foressi
- Female on the Beach (1955) – Queenie Sorenson
- Forever, Darling (1956) – Millie Opdyke
- Anastasia (1956) – Irina Lissemskaia
- Oh, Men! Oh, Women! (1957) – Mrs. Day
- Bernardine (1957) – Mrs. Madge Beaumont
- Back Street (1961) – Mrs. Evans
- Thriller (1961) - Beatrice Graves
- Susan Slade (1961) – Marion Corbett
- Route 66 (1962) - Emily Bridenbaugh
- Gilligan's Island (1964–1967) - (Mrs. "Lovey" Howell)
- The Canterville Ghost (TV episode of ABC Stage 67) (1966) - Mrs. Otis
- 40 Carats (1973) – Mrs. Adams
- The Day of the Locust (1975) – Audrey Jennings
- Beverly Hills Brats (1989) – Lillian
- I'm Dangerous Tonight (1990) – Grandmother
