= Top-rated United States television programs of 1978–79 =

List of the U.S. television programs

This table displays the top-rated primetime television series of the 1978–79 season as measured by Nielsen Media Research.

Rank	Program	Network	Rating
1	Laverne & Shirley	ABC	30.5
2	Three's Company	ABC	30.3
3	Mork & Mindy	ABC	28.6
3	Happy Days	ABC	28.6
5	Angie	ABC	26.7
6	60 Minutes	CBS	25.5
7	M*A*S*H	CBS	25.4
8	The Ropers	ABC	25.2
9	All in the Family	CBS	24.9
9	Taxi	ABC	24.9
11	Eight Is Enough	ABC	24.8
12	Charlie's Angels	ABC	24.4
13	Alice	CBS	23.2
14	Little House on the Prairie	NBC	23.1
15	ABC Sunday Night Movie	ABC	22.6
15	Barney Miller	ABC	22.6
17	The Love Boat	ABC	22.1
18	One Day at a Time	CBS	21.6
19	Soap	ABC	21.3
20	The Dukes of Hazzard	CBS	21.0
21	NBC Monday Night Movie	NBC	20.9
22	Fantasy Island	ABC	20.8
23	Vega$	ABC	20.6
24	Barnaby Jones	CBS	20.5
25	CHiPs	NBC	20.3
26	Stockard Channing in Just Friends	CBS	20.2
27	Diff'rent Strokes	NBC	19.9
28	Monday Night Football	ABC	19.8
28	What's Happening!!	ABC	19.8
30	Lou Grant	CBS	19.7
