= Tina Louise =

American actress (born 1934)

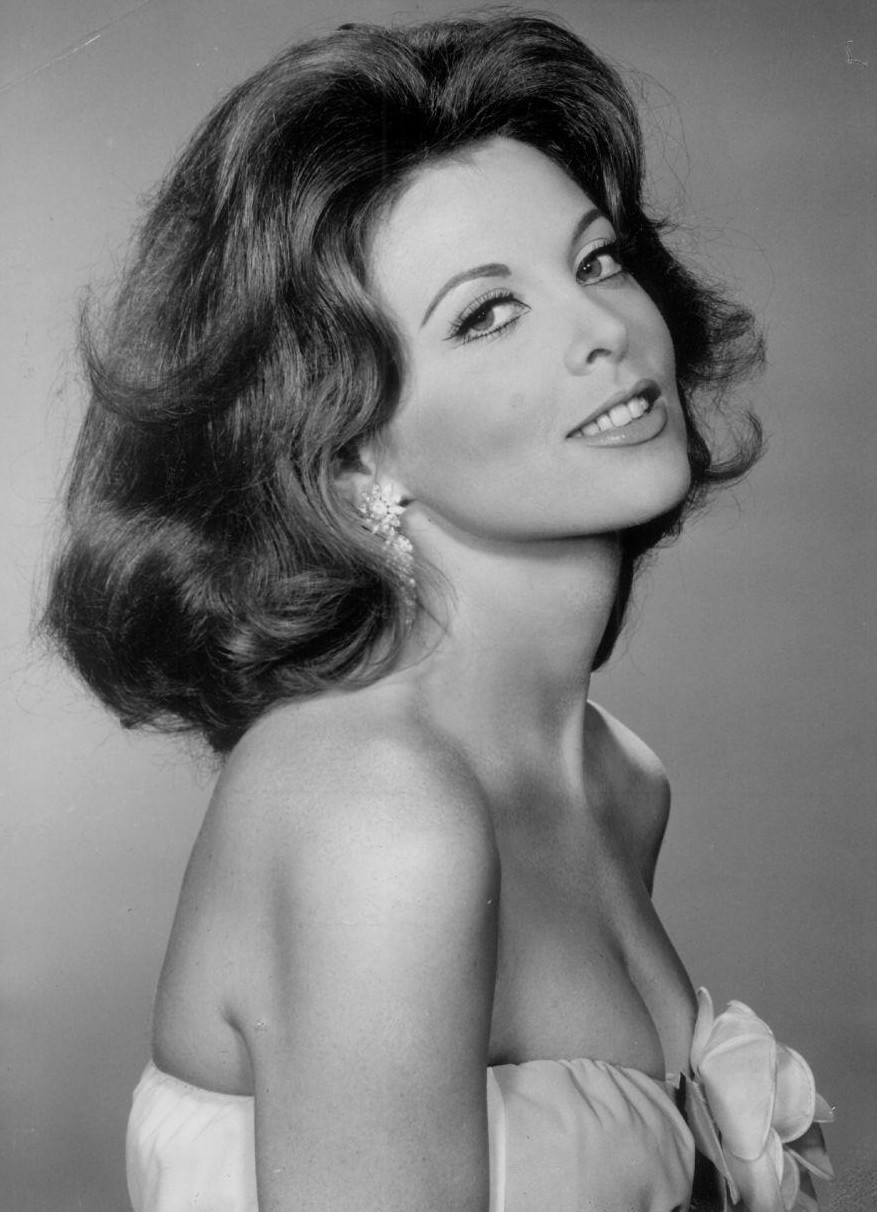
- Louise in 1964
- Born: Tina Blacker; February 11, 1934 (age 92); New York City, U.S.
- Education: Miami University; Neighborhood Playhouse School of the Theatre
- Occupations: Actress; singer
- Years active: 1952–present
- Spouse: Les Crane (m. 1966; div. 1971)
- Children: Caprice Crane

Tina Louise (née Blacker; born February 11, 1934) is an American actress notable for her career on stage, film and television. She is best known for her role as movie star Ginger Grant in the 1960s U.S. television situation comedy Gilligan's Island.

She began her career on stage in the mid-1950s before landing her breakthrough role in the 1958 drama film God's Little Acre for which she received the Golden Globe Award for New Star of the Year.

Louise had starring roles in The Trap, The Hangman, Day of the Outlaw, and For Those Who Think Young. Her other films include The Wrecking Crew, The Happy Ending, The Stepford Wives, and Johnny Suede. She also had a recurring role on the primetime soap opera Dallas.

== Early life ==
Louise was born Tina Blacker on February 11, 1934, in New York City. An only child, she was the daughter of Sylvia (née Horn, later Myers), a fashion model, and Joseph Blacker, a candy store owner in the Brooklyn borough who later became an accountant. She attended PS 6 and Scarborough Day School, and studied at Miami University in Ohio. She is Jewish.

She added the name "Louise" during her senior year of high school. Her drama teacher had suggested it after she mentioned that she was the only girl in the class without a middle name.

== Career ==
=== Early work ===
Louise got her first role at age two in an advertisement for her father's candy store. She began studying acting, singing, and dancing at age 17 under Sanford Meisner at the Neighborhood Playhouse School of the Theatre in Manhattan. Her acting debut came in 1952 in the Bette Davis musical revue Two's Company, followed by roles in such other Broadway productions as John Murray Anderson's Almanac, Will Success Spoil Rock Hunter?, and the hit musical Li'l Abner. She appeared in live television dramas in the anthology series, Studio One and Producers' Showcase.

She was offered modeling jobs, including the 1958 Frederick's of Hollywood catalog, and she appeared on the cover of several pinup magazines such as Adam, Sir!, and Modern Man. Her pictorials for Playboy in May 1958 and April 1959 were arranged by Columbia Pictures studio in an effort to promote her.

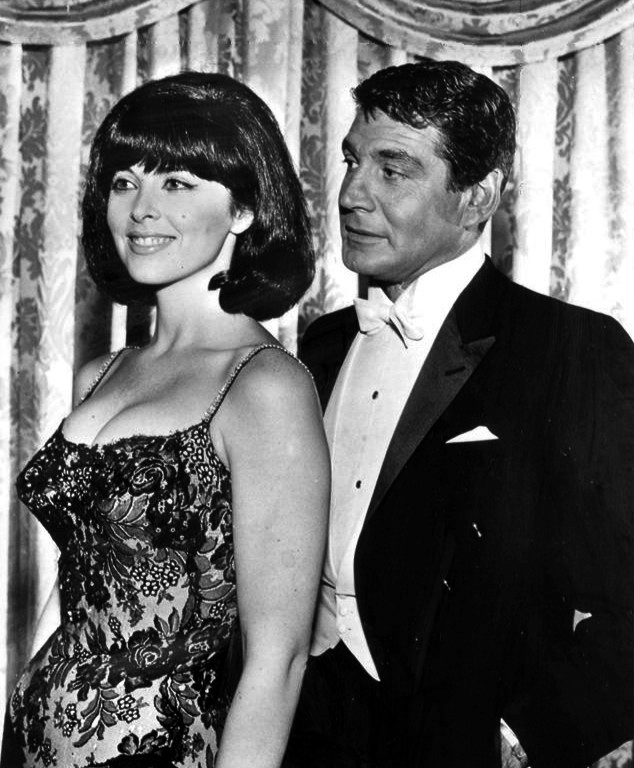
Louise with Gene Barry from the television series Burke's Law (1964)

=== Hollywood and Gilligan's Island ===
Louise made her film debut in 1958 in God's Little Acre. That same year, the National Art Council named her the "World's Most Beautiful Redhead." The next year, she starred in Day of the Outlaw with Robert Ryan. She became a leading lady for stars such as Robert Taylor and Richard Widmark, often playing sombre roles. She turned down roles in the films of Li'l Abner and Operation Petticoat, taking roles on Broadway and in Italian cinema. Among her Italian film credits were The Siege of Syracuse and Garibaldi (both in 1960).

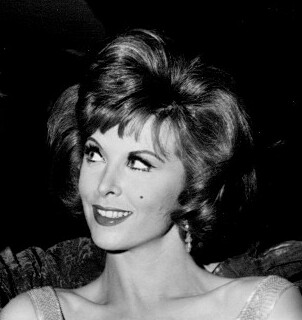
Louise as Ginger Grant in 1966

Louise returned to the United States, began studying with Lee Strasberg, and became a member of the Actors Studio. In 1962, she guest-starred on the situation comedy The Real McCoys, portraying a country girl from West Virginia in the episode "Grandpa Pygmalion". She appeared with Bob Denver two years later in the beach party film For Those Who Think Young (1964). In 1964, she left the Broadway musical Fade Out – Fade In to portray movie star Ginger Grant on the situation comedy Gilligan's Island. She did not appear in any of the subsequent Gilligan's Island sequel movies. She maintained a steady acting career after the series ended, going on to appear in the Matt Helm spy spoof The Wrecking Crew (1968) with Dean Martin and in The Stepford Wives (1975).

In the 1970s, Louise took darker roles, such as a heroin addict in a 1974 episode of Kojak and as a cruel corrections officer in the 1976 television movie Nightmare in Badham County. Other credits from this era include the made-for-TV films Look What's Happened to Rosemary's Baby (1976) and SST: Death Flight (1977), and the soap opera Dallas during the 1978–1979 seasons. In the fall of 1984, she succeeded Jo Ann Pflug as Taylor Chapin on the syndicated soap opera Rituals.

=== Later work ===
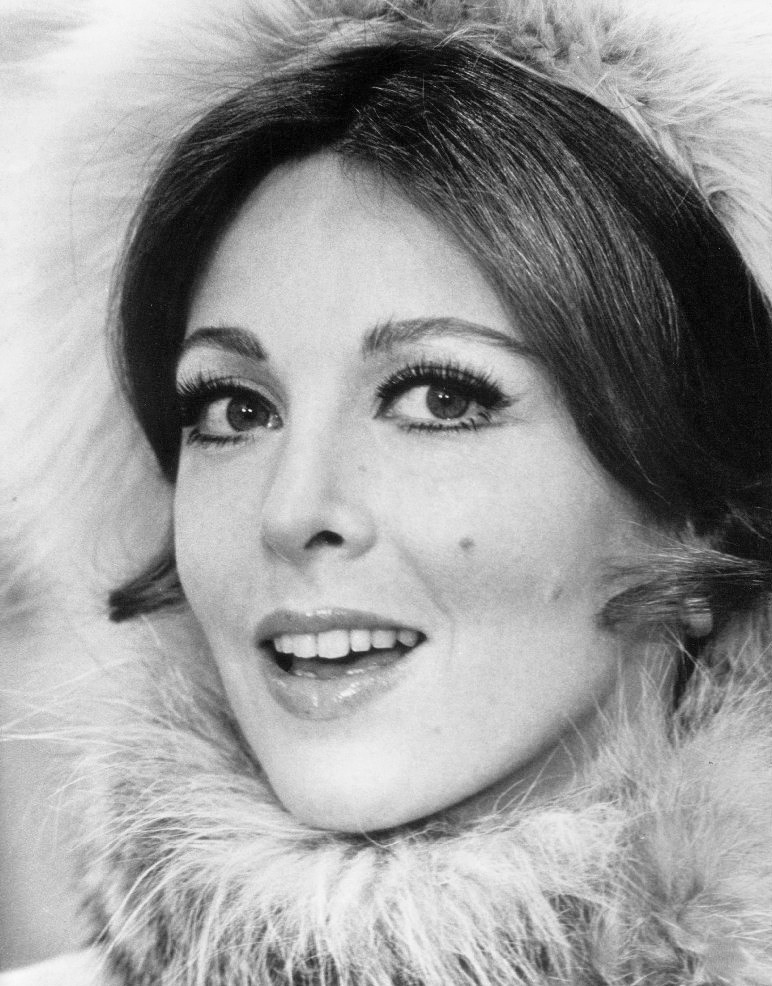
Louise in The Happy Ending (1969)

Later film roles included a co-starring appearance in the Robert Altman comedy O.C. and Stiggs (1987) as well as the independently made satire Johnny Suede (1992) starring Brad Pitt. She appeared in the situation comedy Married... with Children as Miss Beck in episode "Kelly Bounces Back" (1990). In 2014, Louise appeared in the spiritual drama Tapestry and the horror film Late Phases.

Although Louise declined to participate in any of three Gilligan's Island reunion television films, she made brief walk-on appearances on a few talk shows and specials for Gilligan's Island reunions, including Good Morning America (1982), The Late Show (1988) and the 2004 TV Land award show with the other surviving cast members. In the 1990s, she was reunited with costars Bob Denver, Dawn Wells, and Russell Johnson in an episode of Roseanne. In 2005, she wrote a memorial to Bob Denver in the year-end "farewell" issue of Entertainment Weekly.

Following the news of Dawn Wells' passing in December 2020, Louise denied any longtime rumors that she resented the role of Ginger Grant: "Never true – I loved doing my part, especially after they really started writing for my character, originally billed as a 'Marilyn Monroe' type of character. A different director took over and really started to write for my character. I really loved my character." She also said that she was very grateful to the show's fans for their continued support, especially during the COVID-19 pandemic: "We were part of the wonderful show that everyone loves and has been a great source of comfort, especially during these times. We brought a lot of joy to people and still do. This show is an escape from so many things going on. Fathers share it with their children now. I get letters all the time about that."

== Music ==
Louise made one record album, It's Time for Tina, which was released originally on Concert Hall in 1957 (Concert Hall 1521), and later reissued on Urania Records (1958 and 1959 respectively). With arrangements by Jim Timmens and Buddy Weed's Orchestra, 12 tracks include "Tonight Is the Night" and "I'm in the Mood for Love." Coleman Hawkins is featured on tenor saxophone. The album has been reissued on CD twice, most recently on the UK label Harkit Records. The album was made available on iTunes in 2012. Louise also recorded one single for United Artists Records in 1958.

== Personal life ==
From 1966 to 1971, Louise was married to radio and TV announcer/interviewer Les Crane, with whom she had one daughter, Caprice Crane (born 1970), who became an MTV producer and a novelist.

From 1965 to 1968, Les Crane had simultaneous careers as an actor and an interviewer. In 1969, when he was concentrating on acting, he and Louise appeared together as a fictitious married couple in a segment of Love, American Style titled "Love and the Advice-Givers."

Louise is a member of the Academy of Motion Picture Arts and Sciences and a lifetime member of the Actors Studio. Louise has been a vocal advocate for improving child literacy. She donated a portion of the proceeds of her 2007 book, When I Grow Up, to literacy programs and said in a 2013 interview that she had been volunteering at local public schools since 1996. She has written three books including Sunday: A Memoir (1997). When I Grow Up is a children's book that invites children to believe they can become whatever they choose through comparisons drawn from the animal kingdom. A second children's book, What Does a Bee Do?, was published in 2009.

Louise is quoted as saying, "The best movie you'll ever be in is your own life because that's what matters in the end."

A Democrat, Tina Louise campaigned for John F. Kennedy during the 1960 presidential race and campaigned for Hillary Clinton in the 2016 presidential race.

In March 2025, The New York Times ran a story on Tina Louise, then 91, about how she still worked one hour a week, tutoring school children in reading at an Upper East Side Manhattan public school. Louise spoke of her weekly reading sessions in the article, saying: "It's better than vitamins."

== Filmography ==
=== Film ===
Year	Film	Role	Notes
1958	God's Little Acre	Griselda Walden	Golden Globe Award for New Star of the Year – Actress; Laurel Award for Best Female Supporting Performance (5th place)
1959	The Trap	Linda Anderson	
1959	The Hangman	Selah Jennison	
1959	Day of the Outlaw	Helen Crane	
1960	Siege of Syracuse	Diana/Artemide/Lucrezia	
1960	The Warrior Empress	Sappho	
1961	Garibaldi	French Journalist	
1961	Armored Command	Alexandra Bastegar	
1964	For Those Who Think Young	Topaz McQueen	
1967	The Seventh Floor	Dr. Immer Mehr	
1968	The Wrecking Crew	Lola Medina	
1969	How to Commit Marriage	Laverne Baker	
1969	The Good Guys and the Bad Guys	Carmel	
1969	The Happy Ending	Helen Bricker	
1970	But I Don't Want to Get Married!	Miss Spencer	Television film
1973	Call to Danger	April Tierney	Television film
1975	The Stepford Wives	Charmaine Wimpiris	
1975	Death Scream	Hilda Murray	
1976	Look What's Happened to Rosemary's Baby	Marjean Dorn	Television film
1976	Nightmare in Badham County	Greer	Television film
1977	SST: Death Flight	Mae	Television film
1977	The Kentucky Fried Movie	Movie Actress	Uncredited voice
1978	Mean Dog Blues	Donna Lacey	
1979	Friendships, Secrets and Lies	Joan Holmes	Television film
1980	The Day the Women Got Even	Mary Jo Alfieri	Television film
1981	Advice to the Lovelorn	Diane Marsh	Television film
1981	Peter-No-Tail	Molly Creamnose	English version voice
1984	Dog Day	Noémie Blue	
1984	Hell Riders	Claire Delaney	
1985	Evils of the Night	Cora	
1985	O.C. and Stiggs	Florence Beaugereaux	
1987	The Pool	Miloha	
1988	Dixie Lanes	Violet Hunter	
1991	Johnny Suede	Mrs. Fontaine	
1997	Welcome to Woop Woop	Bella	
2000	Growing Down in Brooklyn	Mrs. Pip	
2004	West from North Goes South	Celeste Clark	
2014	Late Phases	Clarissa	
2019	Tapestry	Rose	

=== Television ===
Year	Show	Role	Notes
1956	Studio One	Dolores	Episode: "Johnny August"
1956	Appointment with Adventure	Eva Adams	Episode: "All Through the Night"
1956	Producers' Showcase	Maude	Episode: "Happy Birthday"
1957	The Phil Silvers Show	Gina	Episode: "Bilko Goes South"
1957	Climax!	Maxene Sumner	Episode: "A Matter of Life and Death"
1961	Tales of Wells Fargo	Helene Montclair	Episode: "New Orleans Trackdown"
1961	The New Breed	Stella Knowland	Episode: "I Remember Murder"
1962	Checkmate	Checkmate	Episode: "A Funny Thing Happened on My Way to the Game"
1962	The Real McCoys	Tilda Hicks	Episode: "Grampa Pygmalion"
1963	The Doctors	Janice Wright	2 episodes
1963	Burke's Law	Bonnie Belle Tate	Episode: "Who Killed Billy Jo?"
1964	Kraft Suspense Theatre	Angie Powell	Episode: "The Deep End"
1964	Route 66	Robin	Episode: "I'm Here to Kill a King"
1964	Mr. Broadway	The Girl	Episode: "Smelling Like a Rose"
1964–1967	Gilligan's Island	Ginger Grant	Series regular, 98 episodes
1966	The Red Skelton Show	Daisy June	Episode: "Be It Ever So Homely, There's No Face Like Clem"
1967	The Bob Hope Special	Herself	Television special
1967	Bonanza	Mary Burns	Episode: "Desperate Passage"
1968	It Takes a Thief	Anna Martine	Episode: "Totally by Design"
1969–1973	Love, American Style	Audrey Bailey/Lola/Wilma/Michele Rossi	4 episodes
1970	Ironside	Candy	Episode: "Beware the Wiles of the Stranger"
1972	The New Dick Van Dyke Show	Customer	Episode: "Running Bear and Moskowitz"
1973	Mannix	Linda Cole	Episode: "The Faces of Murder"
1973–1974	Police Story	Anite/April	2 episodes
1974	Kojak	Audrey Norris	Episode: "Die Before They Wake"
1974	Movin' On	Helen Trueblood	Episode: "The Cowhands"
1974	Kung Fu	Carol Mercer	Episode: "A Dream Within a Dream"
1975	Cannon	Nell Dexter	Episode: "The Wedding March"
1976	Marcus Welby, M.D.	Susan Dager	Episode: "All Passions Spent"
1978–1979	Dallas	Julie Grey	6 episodes
1979–1980	CHiPs	Edie Marshall/Herself	3 episodes
1979–1987	The Love Boat	Betty Bricker/Herself	2 episodes
1980	Fantasy Island	Lisa Corday	Episode: "Unholy Wedlock/Elizabeth"
1982	Matt Houston	Jessica Collier	Episode: "The Kidnapping"
1983	Knight Rider	Anne Tyler	Episode: "The Topaz Connection"
1984–1985	Rituals	Taylor Chapin Field von Platen	Series regular
1986	Blacke's Magic	Lainie Warde	Episode: "Death Goes to the Movies"
1986	Simon & Simon	Robin Price	Episode: "Act Five"
1986	Santa Barbara	Cassie Dunn	Special guest star
1990	Married... with Children	Miss Beck	Episode: "Kelly Bounces Back"
1991	Monsters	Mysterious Woman	Voice, Episode: "Talk Nice to Me"
1994	All My Children	Tish Pridmore	Special guest star
1995	Roseanne	Roseanne Conner	Episode: "Sherwood Schwartz: A Loving Tribute"
1999	L.A. Heat	Patricia Ludwigson	Episode: "In Harm's Way"

== Stage work ==
- Two's Company (1952)
- The Fifth Season (1953)
- John Murray Anderson's Almanac (1953)
- Will Success Spoil Rock Hunter? (1955)
- Li'l Abner (1956)
- Fade Out – Fade In (1964)

== Works cited ==
- Boulware, Jack (2000). San Francisco Bizarro: A Guide to Notorious Sights, Lusty Pursuits, and Downright Freakiness in the City by the Bay. New York N.Y.: St. Martin's Press. ISBN 0-312-20671-2.
