= Dawn Wells =

American actress (1938–2020)

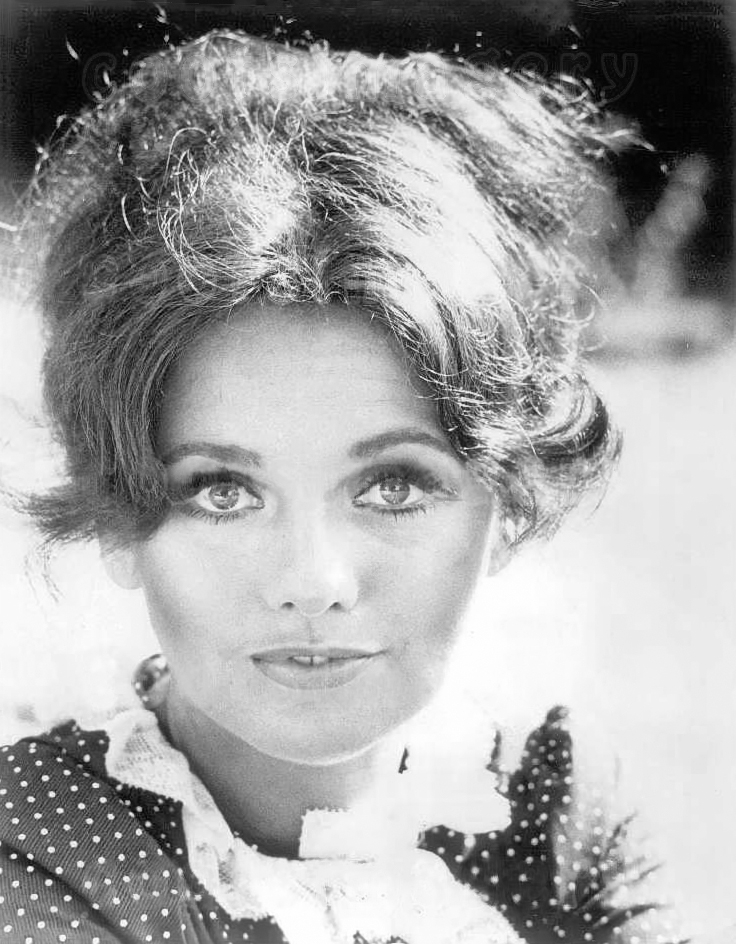
- Wells in 1975
- Born: Dawn Elberta Wells; October 18, 1938; Reno, Nevada, U.S.
- Died: December 30, 2020 (aged 82); Los Angeles, California, U.S.
- Education: University of Washington
- Occupations: Actress; author
- Years active: 1961–2019
- Known for: Miss Nevada 1959; Gilligan's Island
- Spouse: Larry Rosen (m. 1962; div. 1967)

Dawn Elberta Wells (October 18, 1938 – December 30, 2020) was an American actress. She was best known for her role as Mary Ann Summers in the sitcom Gilligan's Island.

== Early life ==
Wells was born to Evelyn (née Steinbrenner, 1911–2004) and Joe Wesley Wells (1911–1967) in Reno, Nevada, where she attended and graduated from Reno High School. Her father owned a local Reno construction company called "Wells Cargo" (not to be confused with the trailer manufacturer). After high school graduation, Wells attended Stephens College in Columbia, Missouri, where she majored in chemistry. She transferred to the University of Washington in Seattle, where she graduated in 1960 with a degree in theater arts and design. She was a member of the Alpha Chi Omega sorority.

== Career ==
In 1959, Wells was crowned Miss Nevada and represented her state in the Miss America 1960 pageant in Atlantic City, New Jersey, finishing outside the top ten.

In Hollywood, Wells made her debut on The Roaring 20's and the movie The New Interns and was cast in episodes of such television series as The Joey Bishop Show, 77 Sunset Strip with Efrem Zimbalist Jr., Cheyenne with Clint Walker, Maverick with Jack Kelly, and Bonanza with Lorne Greene and Dan Blocker.

Wells appeared as a guest star on the Wagon Train episode "The Captain Dan Brady Story" with guest star Joseph Cotten, Tales of Wells Fargo with Dale Robertson, 87th Precinct with Robert Lansing, Surfside 6 with Troy Donahue and Van Williams, Hawaiian Eye with Robert Conrad, Ripcord with Ken Curtis, The Everglades with Ron Hayes, The Detectives with Robert Taylor, Lawman with John Russell, Bonanza, It's a Man's World with Glenn Corbett, Channing with Jason Evers, Laramie with Robert Fuller, Burke's Law with Gene Barry, The Invaders with Roy Thinnes, The Wild Wild West with Robert Conrad, The F.B.I. with Efrem Zimbalist Jr., Vega$ with Robert Urich, The Love Boat, Fantasy Island with Ricardo Montalbán, Matt Houston with Lee Horsley, Growing Pains, Herman's Head with William Ragsdale, Three Sisters with Vicki Lewis, Pastor Greg with Greg Robbins, and Roseanne with Roseanne Barr.

=== Gilligan's Island ===
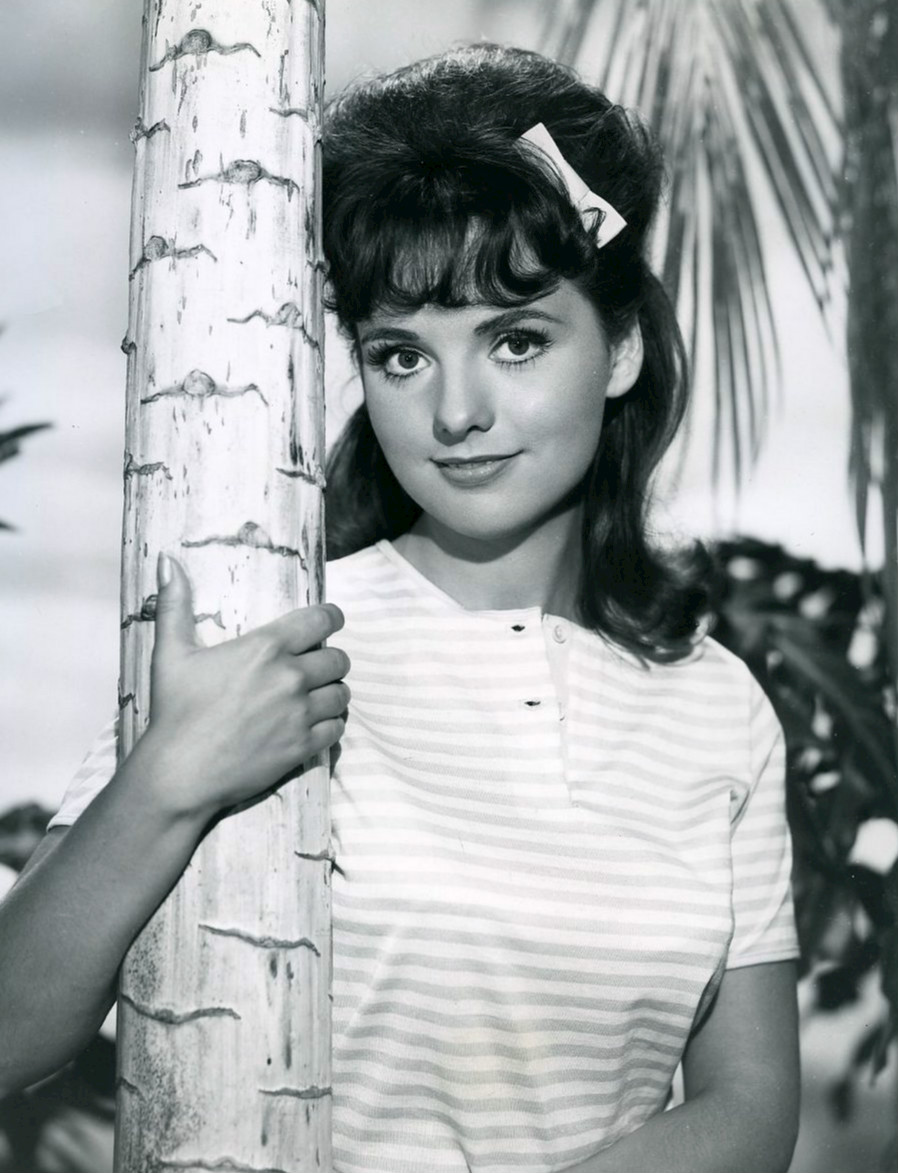
Wells as Mary Ann Summers in Gilligan's Island (1964)

Wells took her signature role of Mary Ann on Gilligan's Island in 1964. The series aired for a total of 98 episodes from 1964 to 1967. She reprised her character in the various Gilligan's Island specials, including the reunion cartoon spin-off Gilligan's Planet (1982–83), and three reunion TV-movies: Rescue from Gilligan's Island (1978), The Castaways on Gilligan's Island (1979), and The Harlem Globetrotters on Gilligan's Island (1981). She also reprised her character in a 1987 episode of ALF, "Somewhere Over the Rerun", and 1992 episode of Baywatch, "Now Sit Right Back and You'll Hear a Tale".

In 1993, Wells published Mary Ann's Gilligan's Island Cookbook with co-writers Ken Beck and Jim Clark, including a foreword by Bob Denver. Alan Hale Jr., who played The Skipper on Gilligan's Island, contributed a family recipe (Kansas Chicken and Dumplings) to her cookbook. Hale's character was the inspiration behind recipes such as Skipper's Coconut Cream Pie, Skipper's Navy Bean Soup, and Skipper's Goodbye Ribeye, and he is depicted as Skipper Jonas Grumby in numerous photographs throughout the book. She said in a 2014 interview with GoErie.com: "Alan could not have been kinder to a young actress. He was a real peach."

In 1997, Wells starred as her Gilligan's Island character in a music video for the song "Mary Ann" by the pop-punk band Squirtgun. The song describes an infatuation with Mary Ann and sings praises to the wholesome character, specifically choosing her over Ginger. The video reached the top 40 of MTV's Alternative Music charts, and it was featured as part of a variety of alternative-themed music video programs.

In 2005, Wells consigned for sale her original gingham blouse-and-shorts ensemble from her signature role. Auction house Profiles in History sold it for $20,700.

In 2014, Wells released What Would Mary Ann Do? A Guide to Life, which she co-wrote with Steve Stinson. The book was released to coincide with the 50th anniversary of Gilligan's Island.

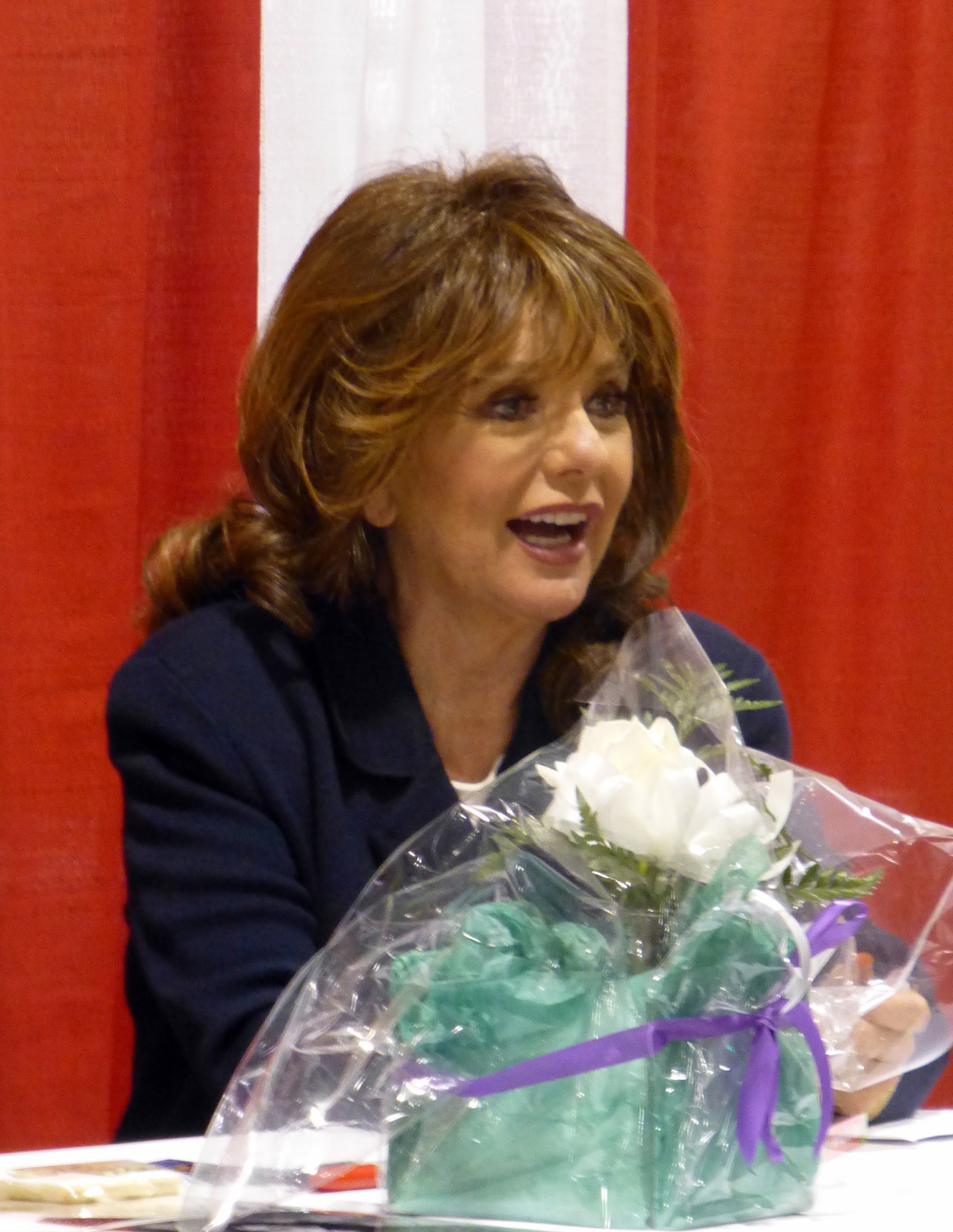
Wells in 2015

A recurring theme, in the form of a rivalry, developed from the show that posed the question, mainly to men, as to which one of the young female stars they preferred: Ginger or Mary Ann? Wells embraced the good-natured rivalry. During a 2014 interview with the Vancouver Sun, Wells said that she had a t-shirt that read: "Ginger or Mary Ann, the ultimate dilemma." The question of which of these two characters men prefer endured long after the end of the series. "You can go anywhere and say 'Ginger or Mary Ann?' You don't have to say what show it is. Everybody gets it. And I always win."

=== Film ===
Wells had small roles in the early-1960s films Palm Springs Weekend and The New Interns, and later starred with Michael Dante in the independent 1975 film Winterhawk, playing a Western settler kidnapped by a Native American chief. Her other films include The Town That Dreaded Sundown, Return to Boggy Creek, Lover's Knot, Soulmates, Forever for Now, and Super Sucker. In fall 2011, she began filming Silent but Deadly (originally titled Hotel Arthritis), a comedy horror film released in 2012.

=== Theater ===
Following Gilligan's Island, Wells embarked on a theater career, appearing in nearly 100 theatrical productions as of July 2009. She spent the majority of the 1970s and 1980s touring in theater productions, notably the second national (bus and truck) tour of Neil Simon's Chapter Two (in the role of Jennie Malone), and replacing Lorna Luft as Sonia Walsk in the second national tour of They're Playing Our Song. She also had a one-woman show at the MGM Grand Hotel and Casino in Las Vegas in 1985.

In 2007, Wells performed in a stage production, of Gilligan's Island: The Musical as Lovey Howell. Considering her voice work as Ginger in the animated series, this means that Wells had played all three female Gilligan's Island characters.

=== MeTV ===
In May 2016, Wells was named marketing ambassador to MeTV Network, which had begun airing reruns of Gilligan's Island.

== Humanitarian activities ==
For several years, Wells operated a business, Wishing Wells Collections, making clothing for people with limited mobility. She was the founder of the Idaho Film and Television Institute, a not-for-profit, educational organization with "a vision of education, technical training and economic development in Southeastern Idaho".

Wells organized and founded SpudFest, an annual family film and festival in Driggs, Idaho, which was sponsored by Idaho Potatoes.

SpudFest held festivals from 2004 to 2008, and showcased film premieres, and included in-person festival appearances by classic TV icons, including Barbara Eden of I Dream of Jeannie and actor Lou Ferrigno, who portrayed The Incredible Hulk.

Wells also lent her support to the Denver Foundation, a West Virginia charity chaired by Dreama Denver, widow of Wells' Gilligan's Island co-star Bob Denver. In November 2009, she appeared at the Denver Foundation's Christmas Wish Celebrity Auction, helping to raise funds for the disabled and disadvantaged in West Virginia.

== Personal life and death ==
Wells married Larry Rosen, a talent agent, on October 27, 1962. The couple had no children, and divorced in 1967.

In 2018, a GoFundMe page was set up to help Wells cope with financial trouble from medical care after a fall.

In June 2020, Wells's manager revealed in court documents that Wells was suffering from dementia.

Wells died from complications related to COVID-19 in Los Angeles on December 30, 2020, at age 82, during the COVID-19 pandemic in California..

== Filmography ==
Sources:

- 1961: Wagon Train – "The Captain Dan Brady Story" as Mrs. Murray
- 1961: The Everglades as Piney
- 1961: The Cheyenne Show – "Lone Patrol" as Sarah Claypool
- 1961: Maverick – "The Deadly Image" as Caprice Rambeau
- 1961: 77 Sunset Strip – 4 episodes as Yvonne Martell/Judy Rogers/Nixie Martin/Connie Kenwood
- 1961: Tales of Wells Fargo – "Kelly's Clover Girls" as Molly
- 1961–1962: Surfside 6 – 2 episodes as June/Consuelo Hernandez
- 1962: Hawaiian Eye – 2 episodes as Carolyn Barnes/Lois Corey
- 1962: Bonanza – "The Way Station" as Marty Johnson
- 1962: It's a Man's World – 2 episodes as Molly
- 1962: Lawman – "No Contest" as Elly Stratton
- 1963: Palm Springs Weekend as Girl at Police Station(uncredited)
- 1963: Ripcord – "Willie" as Evvie Eden
- 1963: Laramie – "The Violent Ones" as Millie
- 1964: The New Interns
- 1964: The Joey Bishop Show – "Joey and Roberta Sherwood Play a Benefit"
- 1964–1967: Gilligan's Island (98 episodes)
- 1967: The Invaders – "Dark Outpost"
- 1967: The Wild Wild West – "The Night of the Headless Woman" as Betsy Jeffers S3 E17
- 1968: Bonanza – "The Burning Sky" as Moon Holt
- 1975: Winterhawk
- 1976: The Town That Dreaded Sundown
- 1977: Return to Boggy Creek
- 1978: Rescue from Gilligan's Island (TV movie)
- 1979: The Castaways on Gilligan's Island (TV movie)
- 1980: The Love Boat "The Family Plan/The Promoter/May the Best Man Win/Forever Engaged/The Judges" as Valerie Madden
- 1981: The Harlem Globetrotters on Gilligan's Island (TV movie)
- 1982–1983: Gilligan's Planet – voices of Mary Ann and Ginger Grant
- 1983: High School U.S.A. (TV movie)
- 1983: Family Feud: "Gilligan's Island vs. Hawaiian Eye"
- 1983: Family Feud: "Gilligan's Island vs. Lost in Space"
- 1983: Family Feud: "Gilligan's Island vs. Batman"
- 1987: Growing Pains: "Carnival" as Myrtle
- 1987: Growing Pains: "Broadway Bound" as Casting Receptionist
- 1987: ALF – "Somewhere Over the Rerun" as Mary Ann
- 1988: The Late Show with Ross Shafer
- 1989: The Princess and the Dwarf
- 1992: Soulmates as Lucille Perkins
- 1992: Baywatch – "Now Sit Right Back and You'll Hear a Tale" as Mary Ann
- 1993: Columbo - "It's All in the Game"
- 1994: Space Ghost Coast to Coast – "Gilligan" as herself
- 1995: Roseanne – "Sherwood Schwartz: A Loving Tribute" as Darlene
- 1995: Lover's Knot as Mary Ann
- 1997: "Mary Ann" – music video by the alternative band Squirtgun, appearing as Mary Ann
- 2000: The Man Show – episode 206, as herself
- 2001: Surviving Gilligan's Island as herself (TV movie)
- 2002: Super Sucker
- 2004: Forever for Now
- 2005: Girlfriends as herself
- 2010: RuPaul's Drag U – "A Star Is Born Again" as herself
- 2012: Hotel Arthritis
- 2013: Chopped – "Chopped Celebrity Holiday Bash"
- 2016: The Bold and the Beautiful 1 episode as Alice
- 2019: The Epic Tales of Captain Underpants – "The Ghastly Danger of the Ghost Dentist" as Gumbalina Toothington

== Books ==
- Wells, Dawn (with Ken Beck and Jim Clark). (1993) Mary Ann's Gilligan's Island Cookbook. Nashville, Tenn.: Rutledge Hill Press.
- Wells, Dawn (with Steve Stinson). (2014) What Would Mary Ann Do?: A Guide to Life. Lanham, Md.: Taylor Trade Publishing.
