= List of black animated characters =

This list of black animated characters lists fictional characters found on animated television series and in motion pictures. The Black people in this list include African American animated characters and other characters of Sub-Saharan African descent or populations characterized by dark skin color (a definition that also includes certain populations in Oceania, the southern West Asia, and the Siddi of southern South Asia).

The names are organized alphabetically by surname (i.e. last name), or by single name if the character does not have a surname.

== In the 1960s ==
Character	Title	Duration	Voice actor	Creator	Ref.
Bem	Humanoid Monster Bem	1968–1969	Kiyoshi Kobayashi	Akira Adachi	
Franklin	Peanuts	1965-	Robin Reed	Charles M. Schulz	
Franklin	Peanuts	1965-	Robin Reed	Lee Mendelson	
Franklin	Peanuts	1965-	Robin Reed	Bill Melendez	
Franklin	Peanuts	1965-	Jake Miner	Bill Melendez	
Franklin	Peanuts	1965-	Marleik "Mar Mar" Walker	Bill Melendez	
Franklin	Peanuts	1965-	Caleel Harris	Bill Melendez	
Franklin	Peanuts	1965-	Christian Dal Dosso	Bill Melendez	
Franklin	Peanuts	1965-	Caleb Bellavance	Bill Melendez	
Franklin	Peanuts	1965-	Antonio Wilson	Bill Melendez	
Pete Jones	The Hardy Boys	1969–1971	Dallas McKennon	Filmation	

== In the 1970s ==
Character	Title	Duration	Voice actor	Creator	Ref.
Astrea	Space Sentinels	1977	Dee Timberlake	Filmation	
Hubert "Geese" Ausbie (Multi Man)	Harlem Globetrotters	1970–1971	Johnny Williams	Hanna-Barbera	
Hubert "Geese" Ausbie (Multi Man)	The Super Globetrotters	1979	Johnny Williams	Andy Heyward	
Black Vulcan	Super Friends	1973–1986	Buster Jones	Hanna-Barbera	
Nate Branch (Liquid Man)	The Super Globetrotters	1979	Scatman Crothers	Andy Heyward	
Brown Hornet	Fat Albert and the Cosby Kids	1972-1985	Bill Cosby	Bill Cosby	
Bucky	Fat Albert and the Cosby Kids	1972-1985	Jan Crawford	Bill Cosby	
Valerie Brown	Josie and the Pussycats	1970-1971	Barbara Pariot	Dan DeCarlo	
Valerie Brown	Josie and the Pussycats	1970-1971	Patrice Holloway	Richard Goldwater	
Cosmo	Rickety Rocket	1979-1980	Bobby F. Ellerby	Ruby-Spears Productions	
William "Bill" Cosby	Fat Albert and the Cosby Kids	1972-1985	Bill Cosby	Bill Cosby	
Russell Cosby	Fat Albert and the Cosby Kids	1972-1985	Jan Crawford	Bill Cosby	
Rude "Rudy" Davis	Fat Albert and the Cosby Kids	1972-1985	Eric Suter	Bill Cosby	
Louis "Sweet Lou" Dunbar (Gizmo)	The Super Globetrotters	1979	Adam Wade	Andy Heyward	
J.C. "Gip" Gipson	Harlem Globetrotters	1970-1971	Richard Elkins	Hanna-Barbera	
Freight Train	Where's Huddles?	1970	Herb Jeffries	Hanna-Barbera	
Granny	Harlem Globetrotters	1970-1971	Nancy Wible	Hanna-Barbera	
George "Meadowlark" Lemon	Harlem Globetrotters	1970-1971	Scatman Crothers	Hanna-Barbera	
Bobby Joe Mason	Harlem Globetrotters	1970-1971	Eddie "Rochester" Anderson	Hanna-Barbera	
Micro Woman (Christy Cross)	Tarzan and the Super 7	1978-1980	Kim Hamilton	Filmation	
Micro Woman (Christy Cross)	Tarzan and the Super 7	1978-1980	Norm Prescott	Filmation	
James "Mushmouth" Mush	Fat Albert and the Cosby Kids	1972-1985	Bill Cosby	Bill Cosby	
Freddie "Curly" Neal (Super Sphere)	Harlem Globetrotters	1970-1971	Stu Gilliam	Hanna-Barbera	
Freddie "Curly" Neal (Super Sphere)	The Super Globetrotters	1979	Stu Gilliam	Andy Heyward	
"Dumb" Donald Parker	Fat Albert and the Cosby Kids	1972-1985	Lou Scheimer	Bill Cosby	
"Fat" Albert Robertson	Fat Albert and the Cosby Kids	1972-1985	Bill Cosby	Bill Cosby	
Pablo Robertson	Harlem Globetrotters	1970-1971	Robert DoQui	Hanna-Barbera	
Pablo Robertson	The New Scooby-Doo Movies	1972-1973	Robert DoQui	Hanna-Barbera	
James "Twiggy" Sanders (Spaghetti Man)	The Super Globetrotters	1979	Buster Jones	Andy Heyward	
Weird Harold Simmons	Fat Albert and the Cosby Kids	1972-1985	Gerald Edwards	Bill Cosby	
Splashdown	Rickety Rocket	1979-1980	Johnny Brown	Ruby-Spears Productions	
Super Stretch (Chris Cross)	Tarzan and the Super 7	1978-1980	Ty Henderson	Filmation	
Sunstroke	Rickety Rocket	1979-1980	John Anthony Bailey	Ruby-Spears Productions	
Lt. Uhura	Star Trek: The Animated Series	1973-1974	Nichelle Nichols	Gene Roddenberry	
Venus	Rickety Rocket	1979-1980	Dee Timberlake	Ruby-Spears Productions	

== In the 1980s ==
Character	Title	Duration	Voice actor	Creator	Ref.
Albert	The Simpsons	1989-	Hank Azaria	Matt Groening	
Alex	Turbo Teen	1984-1985	T. K. Carter	Michael Maurer	
James Dwight "J.D." Corey Bennett	Bionic 6	1987	Norman Bernard	Ron Friedman	
Big Lob	G.I. Joe: The Movie	1987	Norman Bernard	Hasbro	
Carl Carlson	The Simpsons	1989-	Hank Azaria	Matt Groening	
Carl Carlson	The Simpsons	1989-	Alex Désert	Matt Groening	
Cyborg 008 (Pyunma)	Cyborg 009: Legend of the Super Galaxy	1980	Kazuyuki Sogabe	Shotaro Ishinomori	
Diana	Dungeons and Dragons	1983-1985	Tonia Gayle Smith	Kevin Paul Coates	
Diana	Dungeons and Dragons	1983-1985	Tonia Gayle Smith	Dennis Marks	
Diana	Dungeons and Dragons	1983-1985	Tonia Gayle Smith	Takashi	
Doc (Carl W. Greer)	G.I. Joe: The Movie	1987	Buster Jones	Hasbro	
Doc (Carl W. Greer)	G.I. Joe: A Real American Hero	1989-1992	Buster Jones	DIC Entertainment	
Shana Elmsford	Jem	1985	Cindy McGee	Christy Marx	
Walter "Doc" Hartford	The Adventures of the Galaxy Rangers	1986	Hubert Kelly	Robert Mandell	
Heavy Duty (Lamont A. Morris)	G.I. Joe	1989-1992	Hubert Kelly	DIC Entertainment	
Dr. Julius Hibbert	The Simpsons	1989-	Harry Shearer	Matt Groening	
Dr. Julius Hibbert	The Simpsons	1989-	Kevin Michael Richardson	Matt Groening	
Hotwing	Silverhawks	1986	Adolph Caesar	Rankin/Bass Animated Entertainment	
Hotwing	Silverhawks	1986	Doug Preis	Rankin/Bass Animated Entertainment	
Max Jones	Spiral Zone	1987	Hal Rayle	Diana Dru Botsford	
Claudia LaSalle (Note: She later appeared as Claudia Grant in Robotech, a 1985 American adaptation of three Japanese animated series: The Super Dimension Fortress Macross, The Super Dimension Cavalry Southern Cross, and Genesis Climber MOSPEADA, as a single TV series, where she was voiced by Iona Morris)	Super Dimension Fortress Macross	1982-1983	Noriko Ohara	Shōji Kawamori	
Claudia LaSalle	Super Dimension Fortress Macross	1982-1983	Christine Auten	Shōji Kawamori	
Lothar	Defenders of the Earth	1986-1987	Buster Jones	Marvel Productions	
LJ (Lothar Junior)	Defenders of the Earth	1986-1987	Dion Williams	King Features Syndicate	
Hondo MacLean	M.A.S.K.	1985-1986	Doug Stone	Terrence McDonnell	
Hondo MacLean	M.A.S.K.	1985-1986	Doug Stone	Gary Warne	
Hondo MacLean	M.A.S.K.	1985-1986	Doug Stone	Jack Olesker	
Mario	Denver, the Last Dinosaur	1988	Cam Clarke	Peter Keefe	
Mister T	Mister T	1983-1985	Mr. T	Steve Gerber	
Mister T	Mister T	1983-1985	Mr. T	Martin Pasko	
Misty Magic	The Kid Super Power Hour with Shazam!	1981-1982	Jere Fields	Filmation	
Moleculad	Space Stars	1981-1982	David Raynr	Hanna-Barbera	
Officer Black	Dragon Ball	1986-1989	Christopher Sabat	Akira Toriyama	
Paul	Dinosaucers	1987	Richard Yearwood	Michael E. Uslan	
Roadblock (Marvin Hinton)	G.I. Joe: A Real American Hero	1989-1992	Kene Holliday	DIC Entertainment	
Robbie Robertson	Spider-Man	1981-1982	Unknown (Note: Cannot determine whether Buster Jones or Lewis Bailey voiced him)	Stan Lee	
Shanelle Spencer	Beverly Hills Teens	1987	Michelle St. John	Jack Olesker	
Shanelle Spencer	Beverly Hills Teens	1987	Michelle St. John	Michael Maliani	
Shanelle Spencer	Beverly Hills Teens	1987	Michelle St. John	Barry O'Brien	
Stalker (Lonzo Wilkenson)	G.I. Joe: A Real American Hero	1989-1992	Arthur Burghardt	DIC Entertainment	
Thomas	Dirty Pair	1985	Charlotte Chun	Haruka Takachiho	
Thomas	Dirty Pair	1987-1988	Charlotte Chun	Haruka Takachiho	
Baldwin P. "Bulletproof" Vess	COPS	1987	Ken Ryan	Bruce Shelly	
Winston Zeddmore	The Real Ghostbusters	1986-1991	Arsenio Hall	Joe Medjuck	
Winston Zeddmore	The Real Ghostbusters	1986-1991	Buster Jones	Michael C. Gross	

== See also ==
- African characters in comics
- Ethnic stereotypes in comics
- List of black superheroes
- List of black video game characters
