= The Harlem Globetrotters on Gilligan's Island =

1981 made-for-television film

- Title card
- Genre: Adventure; Comedy; Sports
- Written by: Sherwood Schwartz; Al Schwartz; David P. Harmon; Gordon Mitchell
- Directed by: Peter Baldwin
- Starring: Bob Denver; Alan Hale, Jr. Jim Backus; Natalie Schafer; Constance Forslund; Russell Johnson; Dawn Wells; David Ruprecht
- Theme music composer: Gerald Fried
- Country of origin: United States
- Original language: English

Production
- Executive producer: Sherwood Schwartz
- Producers: Hap Weyman; Lloyd J. Schwartz
- Cinematography: K.C. Smith
- Editors: Albert J.J. Zuniga; Beryl Gelfond
- Running time: 94 minutes
- Production companies: Redwood Productions; Universal Television

Original release
- Network: NBC
- Release: May 15, 1981

Related
- The Castaways on Gilligan's Island; Gilligan's Planet

The Harlem Globetrotters on Gilligan's Island is a 1981 made-for-television comedy film. It is the third of three movies that reunited the cast of the 1964–1967 sitcom Gilligan's Island. The film aired on NBC on May 15, 1981.

== Plot ==
The former castaways own and operate a vacation resort called The Castaways, located on the formerly deserted island, which was introduced in the previous film, The Castaways on Gilligan's Island. Thurston Howell III has some business in the mainland; his son, Thurston Howell IV, came to the island and runs the hotel business while his father is working. The Harlem Globetrotters, a traveling troupe of merry basketball players, are on a plane ride over the Pacific Ocean when it suffers engine trouble and is forced to make an emergency landing onto the island. The castaways heard the news on Mr. Howell's private TV. After a brief time stranded in the jungle, they are discovered by Gilligan and the Skipper, and welcomed to The Castaways. The castaways play basketball against the Globetrotters and are soundly defeated. While the castaways did not intend to play a serious game, the Globetrotters believe the group has little athletic ability.

Meanwhile, J.J. Pierson, a corporate raider and Thurston Howell III's worst rival, plans to swindle Gilligan and the others into signing over the island resort ownership to him, knowing that the island contains "supremium", an ore which provides huge sources of energy. After numerous devious acts, Pierson tricks most of the castaways into signing. Gilligan and the Skipper uncover the conspiracy before Thurston Howell IV signs. Mr. Howell forces Pierson to agree to tear up the fraudulent contracts if the Globetrotters play his team, the New Invincibles, which has robot players. The winner gets the island. Notable sports broadcasters Chick Hearn and Stu Nahan appear as part of the basketball game scene, with Hearn calling the play-by-play action of the climactic showdown.

The Globetrotters have no idea how to defeat a team of robots. The Professor is also at a loss on how to defeat them until Gilligan unknowingly remarks that the Globetrotters have not done any tricks, causing the Professor to give a halftime pep talk to the Globetrotters that the New Invincibles would be caught off-guard. The Globetrotters start scoring against the New Invincibles, but when two of them are fouled out, the team will forfeit unless they can find replacements. They recruit Gilligan and the Skipper to serve as substitute players. Moments before the game expires, Gilligan makes the winning shot. Pierson then remarks the outcome of the game does not matter, for while everyone was watching the game he ordered the supremium removed from the mine and loaded onto his boat. The Professor warns that supremium is a very unstable element outside of its natural surroundings. J.J. Pierson realizes this too late as the supremium explodes and sinks his yacht, leaving him penniless.

As everyone celebrates, Thurston Howell III returns from his business trip. The elder Howell commends the Harlem Globetrotters for saving the island and the castaways for their teamwork, and gives thanks to the younger Howell for proving himself an adept manager of the resort.

== Cast ==
- Bob Denver as Gilligan
- Alan Hale, Jr. as Skipper Jonas Grumby
- Russell Johnson as Professor Roy Hinkley, Jr.
- Jim Backus as Thurston Howell III
- Natalie Schafer as Lovey Howell
- Constance Forslund as Ginger Grant
- Dawn Wells as Mary Ann Summers
- David Ruprecht as Thurston Howell IV
- Martin Landau as J.J. Pierson
- Barbara Bain as Dr. Olga Schmetner
- Scatman Crothers as Dewey Stevens
- Whitney Rydbeck as George The Robot
- Dreama Perry Denver as The Howells' Secretary
- Rosalind Chao as Hotel Clerk
- Stu Nahan as Sportscaster #1
- Chick Hearn as Sportscaster #2
- Bruce Briggs as The Referee
- Cindee Appleton as Linda
- Wendy Hoffman as Jackie
- Greg McGrath as Horse Whisperer
- Earl the Pearl as Doghouse Resident
- Jeremiah Sird as Brian

=== The Harlem Globetrotters ===
- Hubert "Geese" Ausbie
- Frederick "Curly" Neal
- James "Twiggy" Sanders
- Louis "Sweet Lou" Dunbar
- Nate Branch
- Clyde "the Glide" Austin
- Jimmy Blacklock
- Charles "Tex" Harrison
- Theodis Lee
- Bobby Joe Mason
- Robert Paige
- Dallas Thornton

== Production ==
The previous film, The Castaways on Gilligan's Island, had been produced as a pilot for a potential series set at The Castaways resort in a similar fashion to The Love Boat, but NBC had decided not to proceed. Nonetheless, a sequel to the film was commissioned, following the newly established format.

NBC executives brought the idea to have the Dallas Cowboys Cheerleaders appear in a Gilligan's Island special to original series creator Sherwood Schwartz. Schwartz liked the idea and agreed to produce a two-hour TV-movie based on this premise. Before the script was completed, NBC informed Schwartz the cheerleaders would not be available and asked him to rewrite the script with the Harlem Globetrotters instead, which Schwartz agreed to do.

At the time of filming Jim Backus was unable to reprise his role due to ill health from Parkinson's disease. Sherwood Schwartz refused to recast Thurston Howell III with another actor, feeling it would hurt Backus too much. So instead, he rewrote the script, writing out Thurston Howell III by having him tend to business in the mainland United States, and adding a new character, Thurston Howell IV, the son of the Howells (played by David Ruprecht) to manage the island resort (although this contradicted the original series, where the Howells were childless). Schwartz was impressed with Ruprecht's performance in maintaining a Howell-like persona without being an imitation of Backus. Toward the end of filming, Backus insisted that he felt well enough to make a cameo appearance and was written in as having returned from his business trip, at the end of the movie. Sherwood Schwartz and Dawn Wells both recalled how emotional it was on set that day as Backus filmed his short scene. He was weakened and very shaky as he said his few lines, but he still dominated his character as before; after he finished his scene, he asked Wells, "Was I funny?" Wells assured him that he was, although she broke into tears afterwards. As Backus left the set with his longtime wife Henny and his caretaker, there was an emotional round of applause for him, from the cast and crew, many of whom were in tears. Backus, who was also in tears, stopped, and responded to the applause by blowing kisses to everybody before he left. He was credited alongside the main cast in the opening scene as "Thurston Howell III", and Ruprecht was credited at the end of the opening with "and introducing David Ruprecht as Thurston Howell IV".

Neither of the previous actresses who played Ginger agreed to reprise their role in this film. Bob Denver's wife, Dreama, having previously appeared in an episode as a cavewoman, appeared as Lucinda, Mrs. Howell's overly punctual secretary.

This was the final performance together of Martin Landau and Barbara Bain, the husband-and-wife team best known for their starring roles in Mission: Impossible and Space: 1999. They divorced in 1993.

Like the original sitcom, The Harlem Globetrotters on Gilligan's Island featured a laugh track.

== Release ==
The Harlem Globetrotters on Gilligan's Island aired on NBC on May 15, 1981, from 8:00 to 10:00 p.m. It received a 26 share in the ratings, which was not an improvement on the previous TV movie The Castaways on Gilligan's Island. Sherwood Schwartz was surprised and disappointed that the ratings were not higher. He lamented that he would likely never get the opportunity to produce another spin-off special that he had conceived, Murder on Gilligan's Island, which would have involved a group of famous detectives investigating the apparent murder of one of the castaways.
