= The Super Globetrotters =

- Genre: Superhero
- Developed by: Andy Heyward
- Written by: Tom Dagenais; Rowby Goren; Andy Heyward; Robert M. London; Larry Parr
- Directed by: Ray Patterson; Carl Urbano; Oscar Dufau; George Gordon
- Starring: Harlem Globetrotters
- Voices of: Scatman Crothers; Stu Gilliam; Buster Jones; Adam Wade; Frank Welker; Johnny Williams
- Narrated by: Michael Rye
- Theme music composer: Hoyt Curtin
- Country of origin: United States
- No. of seasons: 1
- No. of episodes: 13

Production
- Executive producers: William Hanna; Joseph Barbera
- Producers: Alex Lovy; Art Scott
- Running time: 30 minutes
- Production company: Hanna-Barbera Productions

Original release
- Network: NBC
- Release: September 22 – December 15, 1979

Related
- Harlem Globetrotters

The Super Globetrotters is a 30-minute Saturday morning animated series produced by Hanna-Barbera Productions. It premiered on NBC on September 22, 1979, and ran for 13 episodes. It was a spin-off series from Hanna-Barbera's Harlem Globetrotters. Unlike the original Globetrotters series, The Super Globetrotters was solely produced by Hanna-Barbera, whereas the original series was co-produced with CBS Productions. Thus, Super Globetrotters later became incorporated into the library of Warner Bros. while the original series remains under CBS ownership. The series was a re-adaptation of HB's earlier 1966 series The Impossibles.

The Super Globetrotters aired in its own half-hour timeslot from September 22 to November 3, 1979, and beginning November 10, episodes were packaged together with Godzilla under the title The Godzilla/Globetrotters Adventure Hour which ran until September 20, 1980.

Like many animated series created by Hanna-Barbera in the 1970s, the show contained a laugh track created by the studio. This is also one of a number of shows made before the mid-1980s seen on the Cartoon Network and Boomerang to have been taken from time-compressed PAL masters.

== Plot ==
This show featured the basketball team Harlem Globetrotters as undercover superheroes, who would transform from their regular forms by entering magic portable lockers. Each member of the group had individual super powers and could fly. The Super Globetrotters gained their powers through an element called Globetron and another exposure would weaken them on occasions. This was similar to The Impossibles, as the three members of that team were a famous musical trio as civilians.

The Globetrotters received their missions from a basketball-styled talking satellite called the Crime Globe. Most episodes culminated in the Super Globetrotters challenging the villain and his henchmen to a basketball game for whatever treasure or device they sought. The civilian Globetrotters were always bested by the villains' super-powers in the first half, but they would use their own super-powers in the second half (often at the admonition of the Crime Globe) to save the day.

== Characters ==
=== Super Globetrotters ===
- Nate Branch/Liquid Man (voiced by Scatman Crothers) – Branch is the leader of the Super Globetrotters and can transform into living fluid. He is based on Fluid-Man from The Impossibles.
- Freddie "Curly" Neal/Super Sphere (voiced by Stu Gilliam) – Neal can retract his limbs into his head to bounce, smash, and grow. This was one of two original additions to the team not modified from one of The Impossibles.
- James "Twiggy" Sanders/Spaghetti Man (voiced by Buster Jones) – Sanders can use his body as a ladder or a rope. He is based on Coil-Man from The Impossibles and Rope-Man from The Mighty Heroes.
- Louis "Sweet Lou" Dunbar/Gizmo (voiced by Adam Wade) – Dunbar's afro contains an unlimited supply of gadgets. This was the other of the two original additions to the team not modified from one of The Impossibles.
- Hubert "Geese" Ausbie/Multi Man (voiced by Johnny Williams) – Ausbie can clone himself to surround and mystify foes. He is based on Multi-Man from The Impossibles.
- Crime Globe (voiced by Frank Welker) – A basketball-shaped satellite who alerts the Globetrotters of villainous activities and even give them strategies to fight the villains in basketball matches. Crime Globe is based on Big D from The Impossibles.

=== Villains ===
- Museum Man (voiced by Herb Vigran) – Cratchit is a disgruntled history museum janitor who can bring fossils and statues to life through a special remote control called the Skeleton Simulator.
  - Egyptian Guard – An Egyptian guard statue brought to life by Museum Man.
  - Fearless Fossils – A bunch of dinosaur fossils brought to life by Museum Man.
  - Fido Dino – A sauropod fossil brought to life by Museum Man.
- Bwana Bob (voiced by Joe Baker) – A big game hunter who lives on his private island of Bongo Zuny. He has stocked his island with wild animals and traps so that he can hunt his ultimate prey: humans.
  - Putt Putt (voiced by Frank Welker) – Bwana Bob's Native henchman.
  - Bongo Zuny Timid Turtles – A group of giant turtles who make up Bwana Bob's basketball team.
- Facelift (voiced by John Stephenson) – Facelift is an alien who runs on nuclear energy who can steal the faces of people and place them on his Demon Droids. He used this ability in order to steal the faces of the world's leaders.
  - Demon Droids – Faceless robots that serve Facelift.
- Whaleman (voiced by Michael Rye) – Whaleman is a pirate accompanied by the mechanical whale Moby Whale who steals oil, intending to control oil worldwide.
- Robo (voiced by John Stephenson) – Robo is a mad scientist and robotician who created the Globots, robot duplicates of the Globetrotters, to get revenge on Dr. G.G. Goodley after Goodley cut Robo's funding. When the Globetrotters defeat the Globots, Robo and the Globots are incarcerated and the real Globetrotters are cleared of all charges. Robo vows to use his genius for good when he gets out of prison.
- Tattoo Man (voiced by Lennie Weinrib) – A space pirate who can animate the tattoos on his body. After the Globetrotters defeat his basketball team, Tattoo Man eventually reforms and starts showing off his tattoo tricks to the children.
  - Arms the Octopus – An octopus who works for Tattoo Man.
  - Atlas – A henchman of Tattoo Man who possesses immense strength.
  - Glob – A henchman of Tattoo Man who possesses a slimy body.
  - Mercury – A henchman of Tattoo Man who possesses superhuman speed.
- Movie Man (voiced by John Stephenson) – Movie Man is a film director who uses films as inspiration for his crimes.
  - Mighty Movie Monsters – Movie Man's basketball team who are based on the monsters and villains of different monster movies.
    - Batula – A vampire who is a member of the Mighty Movie Monsters. He is a spoof of Count Dracula.
    - Dink Dong (vocal effects provided by John Stephenson) – A large gorilla from the "lost world" who is a member of the Mighty Movie Monsters. He is a spoof of King Kong.
    - Dinorga – A dinosaur who is a member of the Mighty Movie Monsters.
    - Globula – A slimy alien who is a member of the Mighty Movie Monsters. He is a spoof of the Blob.
    - Peerless Frankenstein – A monster who is a member of the Mighty Movie Monsters. He is a spoof of Frankenstein's monster.
- Bad Blue Bart (voiced by Paul Winchell) – Bad Blue Bart is a western outlaw who used the remote-controlled Phantom Cowboys in order to take control of the Bar-B-Q Ranch and gain access to the Steam Wells. After a tie in the rodeo, the Super Globetrotters go up against Bart's Phantom Cowboys in a western version of a basketball game. The Super Globetrotters defeat the Phantom Cowboys and Bart ends up in the calaboose.
  - Fenwick (voiced by Frank Welker) – Miss Jenny's ranch foreman who is actually a henchman of Bad Blue Bart in a plot to get to the steam wells under the Bar-B-Q-Ranch.
  - The Phantom Cowboy (vocal effects provided by Paul Winchell) – The Phantom Cowboy is a steam-operated, remote-controlled zombie who has been causing trouble in Tombstone Valley. Five of them were controlled by Bad Blue Bart and later make up his basketball team.
- The Time Lord (voiced by Don Messick) – Time Lord is a villain who had a special Time Crystal that could alter time including to summon any criminals out of history to do his bidding. He plans to steal T.I.M. (Time Isolation Machine), a time machine built from a grandfather clock in order to take over the world in the past. Time Lord manages to freeze time on the Super Globetrotters and place them in a Time-Warp Barrier in a plan to send them to the time of dinosaurs. Time Lord challenges the Super Globetrotters to a basketball tournament to determine the fate of T.I.M. With advice from Crime Globe, the Globetrotters use Multi Man's shield to protect themselves from Time Lord's Time Crystal. The Super Globetrotters use this tactic to block the Time Lord's Time Crystal as Time Lord ends up surrendering to Multi Man. Time Lord and his henchmen are arrested and T.I.M. is returned to the Time Research Center.
  - Eagle (voiced by Frank Welker) – A historic criminal who is a skilled lookout.
  - Lioness (voiced by Marlene Aragon) – A historic cat burglar.
  - Tumbler – A historic safe-cracker.
  - Wheels – A historic criminal who is a skilled getaway driver.
- Count Bragula (voiced by Lennie Weinrib) – A vampire who is the leader of the Transylvanian Terrors. He plotted to reclaim Transylvania and place it under his control. Bragula is a spoof of Count Dracula.
  - Igor (voiced by Frank Welker) – Count Bragula's second-in-command and member of the Transylvanian Terrors. Following Count Bragula's defeat, Igor was assigned to oversee his 30-year community service.
  - Frightenstein – Member of the Transylvanian Terrors. Following Count Bragula's defeat, Frightenstein becomes a crossing guard. He is a spoof of Frankenstein's monster.
  - Old Lovable Mummy – Member of the Transylvanian Terrors. Following Count Bragula's defeat, Old Lovable Mummy becomes a playground attendant.
  - Vampire bats – Count Bragula's pet vampire bats.
  - Wolf Person – A werewolf who is a member of the Transylvanian Terrors. Following Count Bragula's defeat, Wolf Person ends up going with the Globetrotters. He is a spoof of the Wolf Man.
- Bull Moose (voiced by John Stephenson) – A moose-themed villain who wears fake antlers and is assisted by a gang of livestock-themed henchmen called the Underworld Gang. He had a Golden Ray Gun that turned anything that is hit by its rays to gold.
  - Bull Moose Dogs – Bull Moose's three robot dogs.
  - Ham – Bull Moose's pig-themed henchman.
  - Ponytail – Bull Moose's horse-themed henchwoman, who possesses superhuman speed.
  - Stomper – Bull Moose's tough bull.
  - Weird Beard (voiced by Frank Welker) – Bull Moose's goat-themed henchman.
  - Wise Quacker – Bull Moose's duck-themed henchman.
  - Woolly Woman – Bull Moose's sheep-themed henchwoman, who has wool-like hair.
- Merlo the Magician (voiced by John Stephenson) – Merlo is a wizard who leads the Knights of the Crooked Table. He and his Knights of the Crooked Table have been stealing the world's monuments like London Bridge, the Eiffel Tower, the Statue of Liberty, and the Pyramid of Giza. After the Globetrotters defeat him, Merlo reluctantly returns the monuments to their rightful locations. He is a spoof of Merlin.
  - Knights of the Crooked Table – A group of knights that serve as Merlo's henchmen. They are a spoof of the Knights of the Round Table.
- Attila the Hun (voiced by Frank Welker) – Attila the Hun and his army of Huns had followed a scientist named Professor Herbert George through his Time Transporter from 450 AD to the present. The Huns end up running amok in San Francisco until they run into the Globetrotters. The Super Globetrotters then end up going against Attila and his Huns in a basketball tournament to determine who leaves the century. After the Globetrotters won, Attila and his Huns intend to return to their time. Attila and his Huns get off the transporter before their time and end up in the 19th century, where they pose as Jesse James and his gang and encounter the Super Globetrotters' ancestors.
  - Crunch – A super-strong member of Attila's Huns.
  - Draco – A fire-breathing member of Attila's Huns.
  - Ox – Member of Attila's Huns.

== Episodes ==
No.	Title	Original release date	Prod. code
1	"The Super Globetrotters vs. Museum Man"	September 22, 1979	7902
Museum Man uses his Skeleton Simulation gun to bring the dinosaur skeletons to life in a plot to take over Big City.
2	"The Super Globetrotters vs. Bwana Bob"	September 29, 1979	7905
A cruise ship that the Globetrotters are on crashes off the coast of Bongo Zuny where a big game hunter named Bwana Bob plans to hunt the Globetrotters and the people on the cruise.
3	"The Super Globetrotters vs. The Facelift"	October 6, 1979	7907
A nuclear-powered alien named Facelift plots to steal the faces of the World Leaders and place them on his Demon Droids in order to gain control of the world.
4	"The Super Globetrotters vs. Whaleman"	October 13, 1979	7901
Whaleman uses the mechanical whale Moby Whale in order to steal supertankers containing 50 tons of oil as part of a plot to control the world's oil supplies.
5	"The Super Globetrotters vs. Robo and the Globots"	October 20, 1979	7908
To help in his revenge on G.G. Godfrey, Robo builds robotic duplicates of the Globetrotters to commit a crime spree that ends up framing the real Globetrotters.
6	"The Super Globetrotters vs. Tattoo Man"	October 27, 1979	7903
A space pirate named Tattoo Man is on a gold-robbing spree.
7	"The Super Globetrotters vs. Movie Man"	November 3, 1979	7910
Movie Man plans to steal a top secret mystery robot. Crime Globe warns them that the mystery robot in question is filled with Globetron.
8	"The Super Globetrotters vs. The Phantom Cowboy"	November 10, 1979	7904
While visiting Miss Jenny on her Bar-B-Q-Ranch, the Globetrotters learn that the Phantom Cowboy is responsible for various attacks in Tombstone Valley. The Crime Globe states that the Phantom Cowboy is actually a remote-controlled zombie and now the Globetrotters must find the person controlling it.
9	"The Super Globetrotters vs. The Time Lord"	November 17, 1979	7909
Time Lord invades the Time Research Center in order to steal a time machine called T.I.M. (short for Time Isolation Machine). He uses his criminals from history to help him.
10	"The Super Globetrotters vs. Transylvania Terrors"	November 24, 1979	7906
Count Bragula and his Transylvania Terrors plot to take over Transylvania and place it under their control. The Globetrotters are called in to keep Count Bragula from taking over Transylvania.
11	"The Super Globetrotters vs. Bull Moose"	December 1, 1979	7912
Bull Moose steals the Goose that Laid the Golden Eggs in order to complete his golden ray and take over Breadbasket City.
12	"The Super Globetrotters vs. Merlo the Magician"	December 8, 1979	7911
Merlo the Magician and his Knights of the Crooked Table are stealing the world's monuments.
13	"The Super Globetrotters vs. Attila the Hun"	December 15, 1979	7913
Attila the Hun and his Huns follow Professor Herbert George through his Time Transporter. When they cause havoc in San Francisco, the Super Globetrotters are called in to stop Attila the Hun and return him to his own time.

== Home release ==
On October 28, 2014, Warner Archive released The Super Globetrotters: The Complete Series on Region 1 DVD as part of their Hanna–Barbera Classics Collection.

== Voice cast ==
- Scatman Crothers as Fluid Man/Nate Branch
- Stu Gilliam as Super Sphere/Freddie "Curly" Neal
- Buster Jones as Spaghetti Man/James "Twiggy" Sanders
- Michael Rye as Narrator, Basketball Announcer, Lighting Man, Mayor of Breadbasket City, Whaleman
- Adam Wade as Gizmo/Louis "Sweet Lou" Dunbar
- Frank Welker as Crime Globe, Attila the Hun, Eagle, Fenwick, Igor, Pingu, Weird Beard, Eagle, Make-Up Master, Putt Putt
- Johnny Williams as Multi Man/Hubert "Geese" Ausbie

=== Additional voices ===
- Marlene Aragon as Lioness
- Joe Baker as Bwana Bob
- Michael Bell
- Chris Elie
- Jackie Joseph
- Margaret McIntyre
- Don Messick as Time Lord
- John Stephenson as Bull Moose, Dink Dong, Facelift, Merlo the Magician, Movie Man, Professor Herbert George, Robo, Sound Man
- Herbert Vigran as Museum Man/Cratchit
- Janet Waldo
- Lennie Weinrib as Tattoo Man, Count Bragula
- Nancy Wible
- Helen Wilson
- Paul Winchell as Bad Blue Bart, Phantom Cowboys

== See also ==
- List of works produced by Hanna-Barbera
- List of Hanna-Barbera characters
