= Albert Pullins =

American professional basketball player (1910-1985)

Albert "Runt" Pullins (November 23, 1910 - October 19, 1985) was an American professional basketball player. Born in Louisiana, his family moved to Chicago when he was a child. There, he led Wendell Phillips High School to a lightweight city basketball championship. This was the first city basketball title in Chicago's history to be won by an African American team. He became one of the original members of Abe Saperstein's Harlem Globetrotters in 1929 and was among the team's biggest stars. Pullins was inducted into the Naismith Memorial Basketball Hall of Fame in 2022.
