= Charles Harrison (basketball) =

American basketball player (1933–2014)

Charles "Tex" Harrison
Harlem Globetrotters

Personal information
- Born: January 20, 1933 Gary, Indiana, U.S.
- Died: November 20, 2014 (aged 81) Houston, Texas, U.S.
- Listed height: 6 ft 3 in (1.91 m)

Career information
- High school: Wheatley High School
- College: North Carolina Central

Charles "Tex" Harrison (January 20, 1933 – November 20, 2014) was an American basketball player, born in Indiana and raised in Texas, who played and coached for the Harlem Globetrotters for six decades. Harrison was the first player from a historically African American college to receive All-American honors.

After he was discovered by the Globetrotters in 1954, he played with and coached for players such as Meadowlark Lemon, Marques Haynes, Wilt Chamberlain, and Fred Neal. During his playing career, Harrison had tea with Queen Elizabeth, played for an audience of three popes, ate caviar with Nikita Khrushchev, and starred in a Saturday morning variety show.

He died at 81 years old in Houston, Texas.

== Early life ==
Harrison was born to Lullelia Walker Harrison and Alexander Crystal Harrison in Gary, Indiana. Harrison was raised in Houston, Texas after his family moved there in 1933. He had one older brother, Alexander Crystal Harrison II.

Harrison's father was a small business operator as well as the regional manager of General Foods, Inc. His mother was an educator, civil rights activist, author, and community servant to many volunteer organizations. Her civil rights efforts included her assistance in establishing the Texas State University of Negroes (now known as Texas Southern University) and the Thurgood Marshall School of Law. Walker Harrison also served on the board of directors for over a dozen organizations and was a teacher and guidance counselor for schools in the Houston Independent District.

Harrison attended Wheatley High School in Houston.

== College ==
Harrison attended North Carolina Central University where he earned a degree in physical education and became the first player from a historically African American college to receive All-American honors. It was in college where Harrison was given the nickname "Tex," inspired by his recognizable 6 ft 3 frame.

== Career ==
=== Harlem Globetrotters ===
Harrison was discovered in 1954 when he faced The Harlem Globetrotters as a member of the College All-American team during the World Series of Basketball. Later described as an "iconic figure" for the Globetrotters, Harrison was known to be an "outstanding dribbler and rebounder." During his basketball career, it is estimated that Harrison traveled to more than 100 counties. Harrison also had tea with Queen Elizabeth and played for an audience of three popes. He played for the Globetrotters for 18 years before becoming a coach and advisor for his team.

"Aside from my family, being a Harlem Globetrotter has been the greatest highlight of my life. I have had the good fortune to be a part of the most celebrated sports team in history."

— Charles "Tex" Harrison, http://www.click2houston.com/news/former-harlem-globetrotter-charles-tex-harrison-dies-in-houston

=== Moscow Games ===
Harrison was among many notable Globetrotter players who went to Moscow during a 1959 tour for a nine-game exhibition in the midst of the Cold War, where he ate caviar with former Russian First Secretary Nikita Khrushchev. The games were a symbol that relations between the U.S. and the Soviet Union were improving. The Moscow tour solidified the Globetrotters as global ambassadors, and Harrison and the team were awarded the Athletic Order of Lenin Medal in 1959.

=== Television ===
Harrison joined his teammates on The Harlem Globetrotters Popcorn Machine, a 1974-75 Saturday morning variety show that featured players singing, dancing, and performing comedy sketches.

=== Coaching ===
After playing for 18 years for the Globetrotters, Harrison became a coach and advisor for the team. He spent many of his New Year's Eves in Milwaukee coaching the Globetrotters for their annual game against the Washington Generals and the New York Nationals.

Harrison received a “Legends” Ring from the team in 1996.

"We want to give the kids a message of hope. The Globetrotters are a role model of talent and athletic excellence for young people to emulate. Basketball has done a lot for each of us, and we think it can help young people everywhere by giving them something constructive to do."

— Charles "Tex" Harrison, http://www.themoscowtimes.com/news/article/harlem-globetrotters-bounce-into-russia/297107.html

== Personal life ==
Harrison married Tommye L. Cary in 1964, and they were together for 47 years until Cary died in 2011. Cary and the couple's three daughters would often accompany Harrison during his tours in the summer.

== Death ==
Harrison died at 81 years old in Houston, Texas. After his death, the Globetrotters honored Harrison's legacy by adding a band that read “TEX” on the players’ uniforms for a 2015 world tour.
