= The Harlem Globetrotters Popcorn Machine =

- Genre: Children's television series
- Created by: John Aylesworth; Frank Peppiatt
- Written by: John Aylesworth; Frank Peppiatt; Jack Burns
- Directed by: Tony Mordente
- Starring: Geese Ausbie; John Aylesworth; Nate Branch; Marques Haynes; Charles "Tex" Harrison; Theodis Lee; Meadowlark Lemon; Bobby Joe Mason; Curly Neal; Rodney Allen Rippy; John Smith
- Country of origin: United States
- Original language: English

Production
- Production location: CBS Television City
- Running time: 25 minutes
- Production companies: Funhouse Productions Inc; Viacom Productions

Original release
- Network: CBS
- Release: September 7, 1974 – August 30, 1975

The Harlem Globetrotters Popcorn Machine is a Saturday morning variety show featuring players from the basketball team the Harlem Globetrotters singing, dancing, and performing comedy sketches. Broadcast on CBS from September 7, 1974 to August 30, 1975, it was produced by Funhouse Productions for Viacom Productions.

== Cast ==
The Harlem Globetrotters:

- Meadowlark Lemon
- Marques Haynes
- Charles "Tex" Harrison
- Hubert "Geese" Ausbie
- Nate Branch
- Curly Neal
- Theodis "Wolfman" Lee
- John Smith
- Bobby Joe Mason
- Avery Schreiber as Mr. Evil
- Rodney Allen Rippy as himself
- John Aylesworth - announcer
