= Bob Karstens =

American basketball player

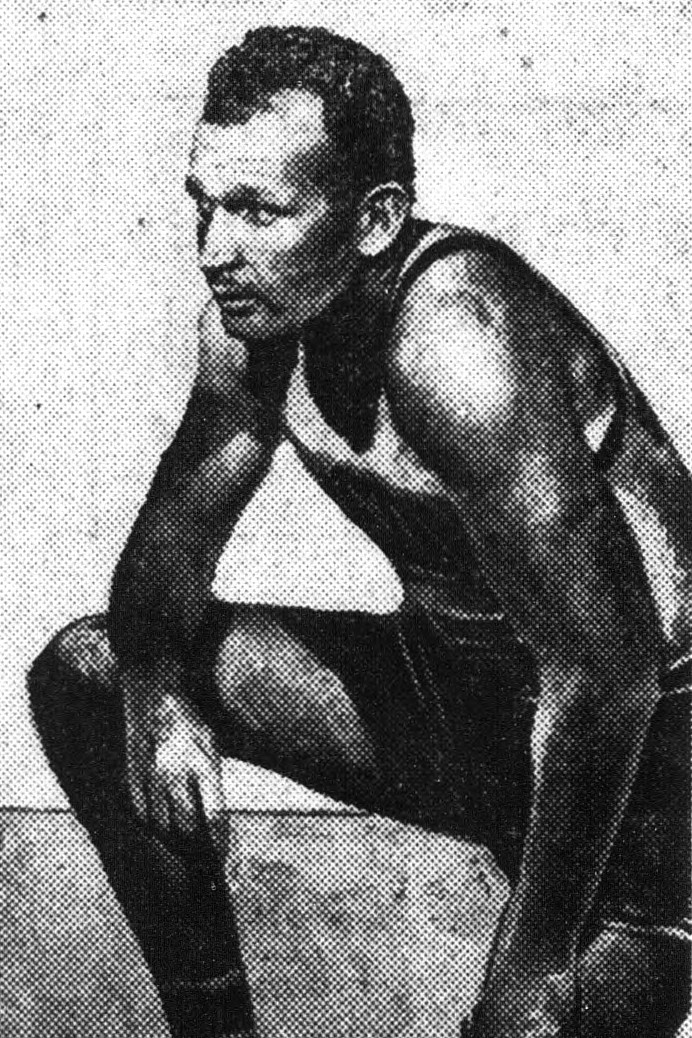
Karstens, circa 1951

Robert H. Karstens (March 11, 1915 – December 31, 2004) was a professional basketball player in the United States. Karstens was born in Davenport, Iowa and attended school at Iowa Central Turner Gym and St. Ambrose College. A white man, Karstens was the third non-black player on the Harlem Globetrotters' roster. First was owner Abe Saperstein as a substitute in the team's first year. Second was Rob Nichol a Canadian in 1941. He invented a few routines including the magic circle and the yo yo basketball. He played on the All Black Team, 8 years before the NBA was integrated. He stayed on as a team manager from 1954 to 1994. He died on December 31, 2004.
