= Marques Haynes =

American basketball player (1926–2015)

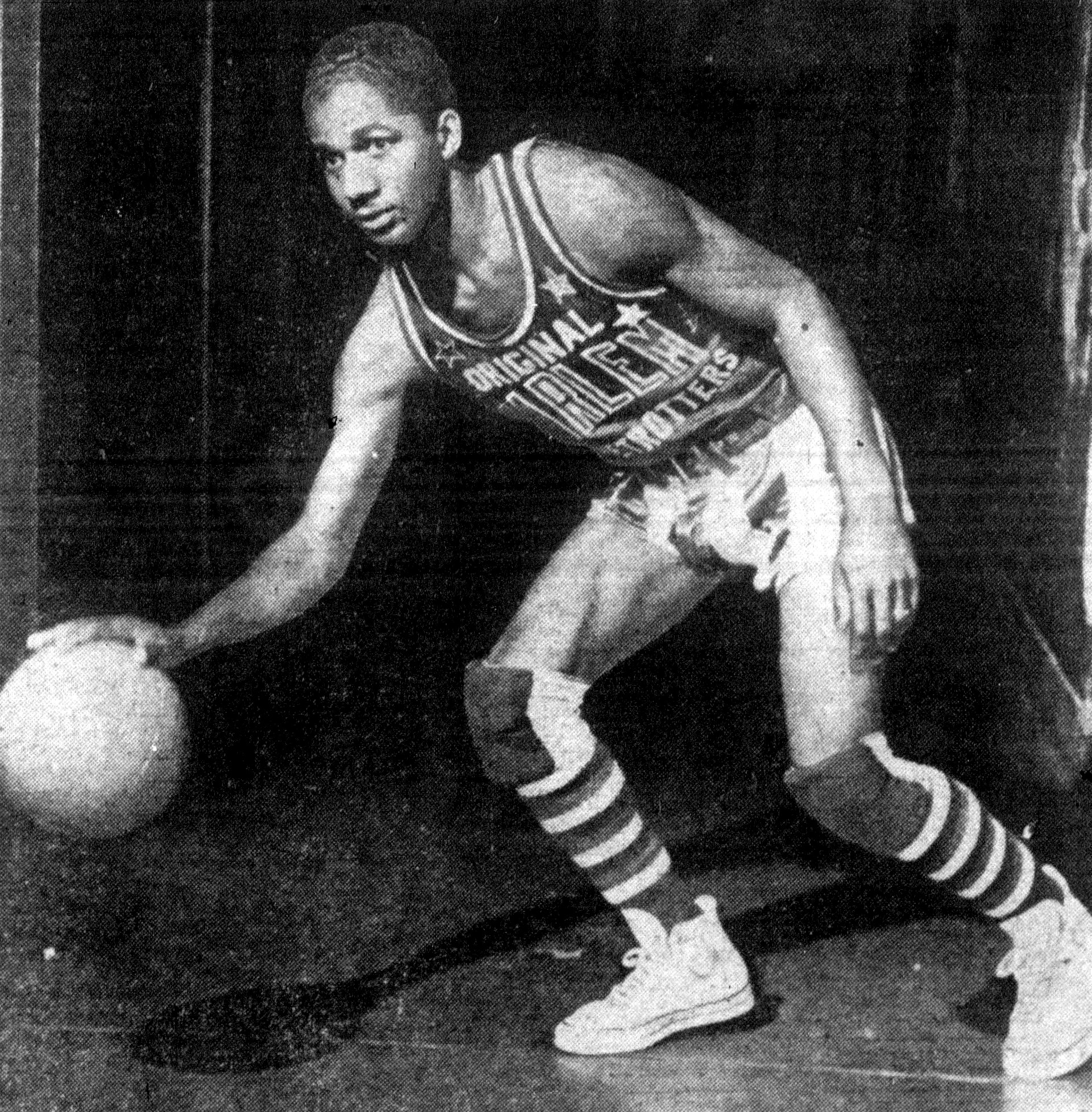
- Haynes, circa 1951

Personal information
- Born: March 10, 1926 Sand Springs, Oklahoma, U.S.
- Died: May 22, 2015 (aged 89) Plano, Texas, U.S.

Career information
- High school: Booker T. Washington (Sand Springs, Oklahoma)
- College: Langston (1942–1946)
- Position: Point guard
- Basketball Hall of Fame

Marques Haynes (March 10, 1926 – May 22, 2015) was an American professional basketball player and member of the Harlem Globetrotters, notable for his ability to dribble the ball and keep it away from defenders. According to the 1988 film Harlem Globetrotters: Six Decades of Magic, Haynes could dribble the ball as many as 348 times a minute.

== Early playing days ==
As a child, Haynes learned to dribble a basketball in the dirt yard of his home. A native of Sand Springs, Oklahoma, he attended Booker T. Washington High School and received a $25 church scholarship to play basketball for Langston University, where he attended from 1942 to 1946. During his time with the Langston Lions, the team racked up a winning record of 112–3, including a 59-game winning streak.

In a February 1945 conference tournament game, Haynes showed off his dribbling skills for more than two minutes, running down the clock on a solid lead to ridicule an opponent, Southern University, which had run up the score against an inferior team (Sam Huston College, later Huston–Tillotson University, coached by a young Jackie Robinson) in a previous round. Haynes' own coach, the legendary Zip Gayles, threatened to kick him off the team for his showboating display, but it got an immense response from the crowd at the game.

In 1946, Langston was invited to play an exhibition game against the Globetrotters in Oklahoma City. In that game, Haynes led Langston to a 4-point win, catching the eye of team owner Abe Saperstein in the process. He was invited to join the Globetrotters, and, after completing his degree, began his long professional career. Prior to joining the Globetrotters, Haynes briefly played for the Kansas City Stars of the Black Professional Basketball League.

== Tenure with the Harlem Globetrotters ==
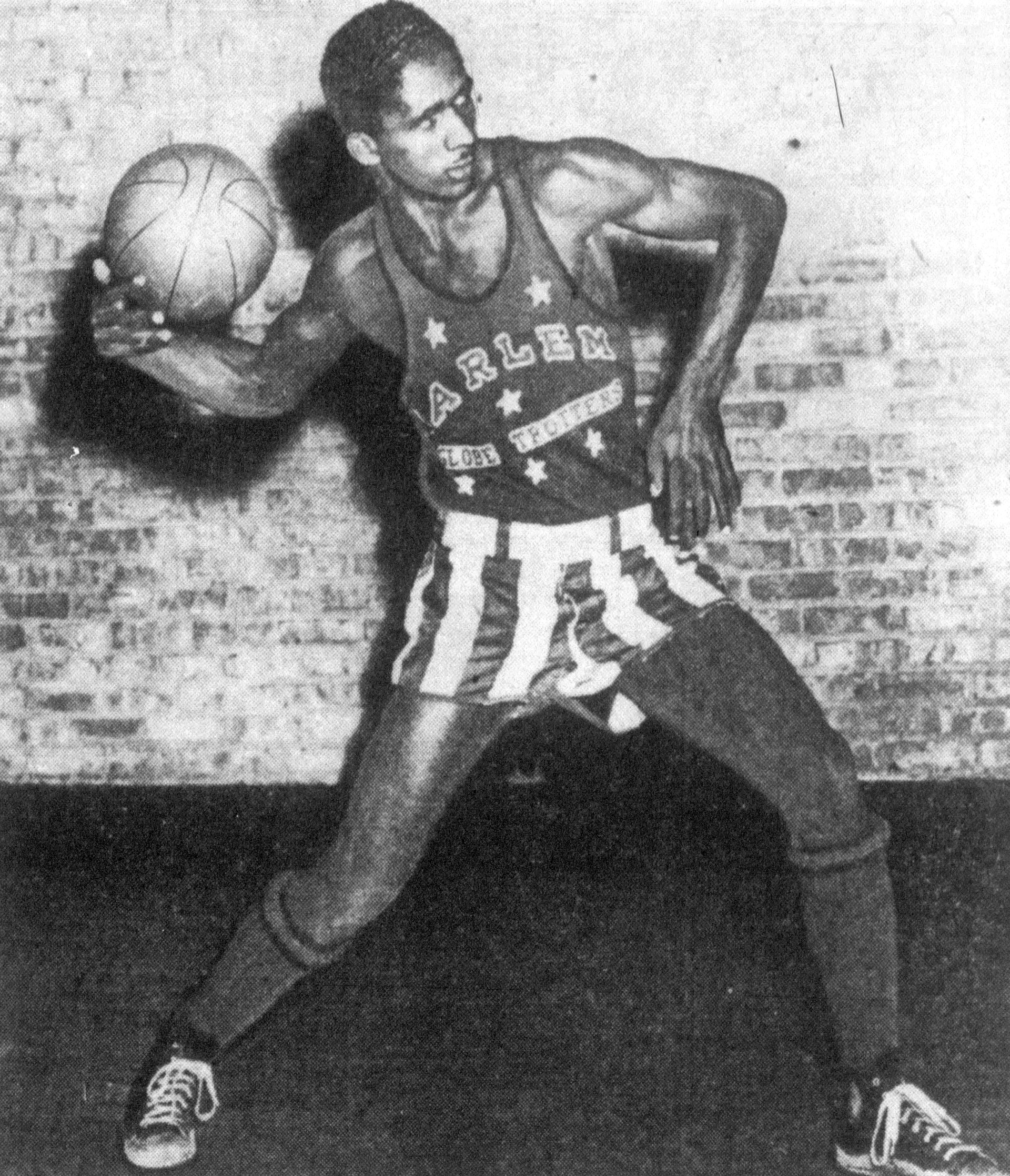
Haynes, circa 1950

Haynes played with the Globetrotters from 1947 to 1953. One of the exhibition games in which he played was the famous game in West Berlin on August 22, 1951, where a landmark 75,000 people were recorded in attendance—although Haynes later insisted the turnout was closer to 90,000—and Haynes met track star Jesse Owens, with whom he roomed on the tour. He also toured South America with the Globetrotters and played a series of exhibition games against some of the top college basketball teams in the United States.

In 1953, Haynes left the Globetrotters after an acrimonious split with Abe Saperstein, the team's owner. After quitting the team, he turned down a $35,000 a year offer from the Philadelphia Warriors that would have made him the second-highest paid player in the NBA to found his own barnstorming team, the Harlem Magicians, after finding out that Saperstein was a part-owner of the Warriors. He also received an offer to play for the Minneapolis Lakers in 1955, but he turned down that opportunity as well. Despite a series of legal battles with Saperstein, Haynes attended his funeral in 1966, although he later joked he was only there to "make sure he didn't jump out of the casket".

Haynes later rejoined the Globetrotters as a player and coach in 1972. During his second stint with the team, he founded a clothing company in 1973, through which he met his wife Joan, a model. He was a regular on the 1974–75 The Harlem Globetrotters Popcorn Machine TV show. After leaving the Globetrotters again in 1979, he played for Meadowlark Lemon's Bucketeers, the Harlem Wizards, and a revitalized incarnation of his old Harlem Magicians.

By the end of his playing career, Haynes was estimated to have played in at least 12,000 games and visited more than 100 countries.

== In retirement ==
Haynes retired in 1992 after a 46-year professional career, and was inducted into the Naismith Memorial Basketball Hall of Fame in 1998, the first Globetrotter to be so honored. On January 5, 2001, he received his "Legends" ring from the Harlem Globetrotters in Chicago. The Globetrotters also retired his #20 jersey in his honor.

Haynes spent his twilight years in Plano, Texas, where he and his wife moved in the mid-1990s to be closer to their daughters. His old team, the Globetrotters, "pulled strings" to get him a ticket to the 2010 NBA All-Star Game in Arlington, Texas. In 2011, he was inducted into the Oklahoma Hall of Fame. That year, he also joined the staff of the Texas Legends, a farm team for the Dallas Mavericks. At the time, he told the press that, even at the age of 85, "Basketball is constantly on my mind."

== Death ==
Haynes died at the age of 89 on May 22, 2015, in Plano, Texas. His death was stated to be of natural causes.

== Legacy ==
Haynes was considered to be among the greatest ballhandlers who ever lived. Wilt Chamberlain once said, "What he did was something that I could never do, and I could do almost everything on the basketball court." His game influenced players such as Bob Cousy, Pete Maravich, and Fred "Curly" Neal. He has been described as one of the best basketball players never to compete in the NBA.

Haynes was known for his catchphrase, "I'm Marques Haynes, I'll show you how!" His daughter Marsha is married to Dallas Cowboys player Drew Pearson.

The March 16, 2022, game between Morgan State and Youngstown State at The Basketball Classic was designated as the Marques Haynes Game.
