= Abe Saperstein =

Harlem Globetrotters founder and first coach (1902–1966)

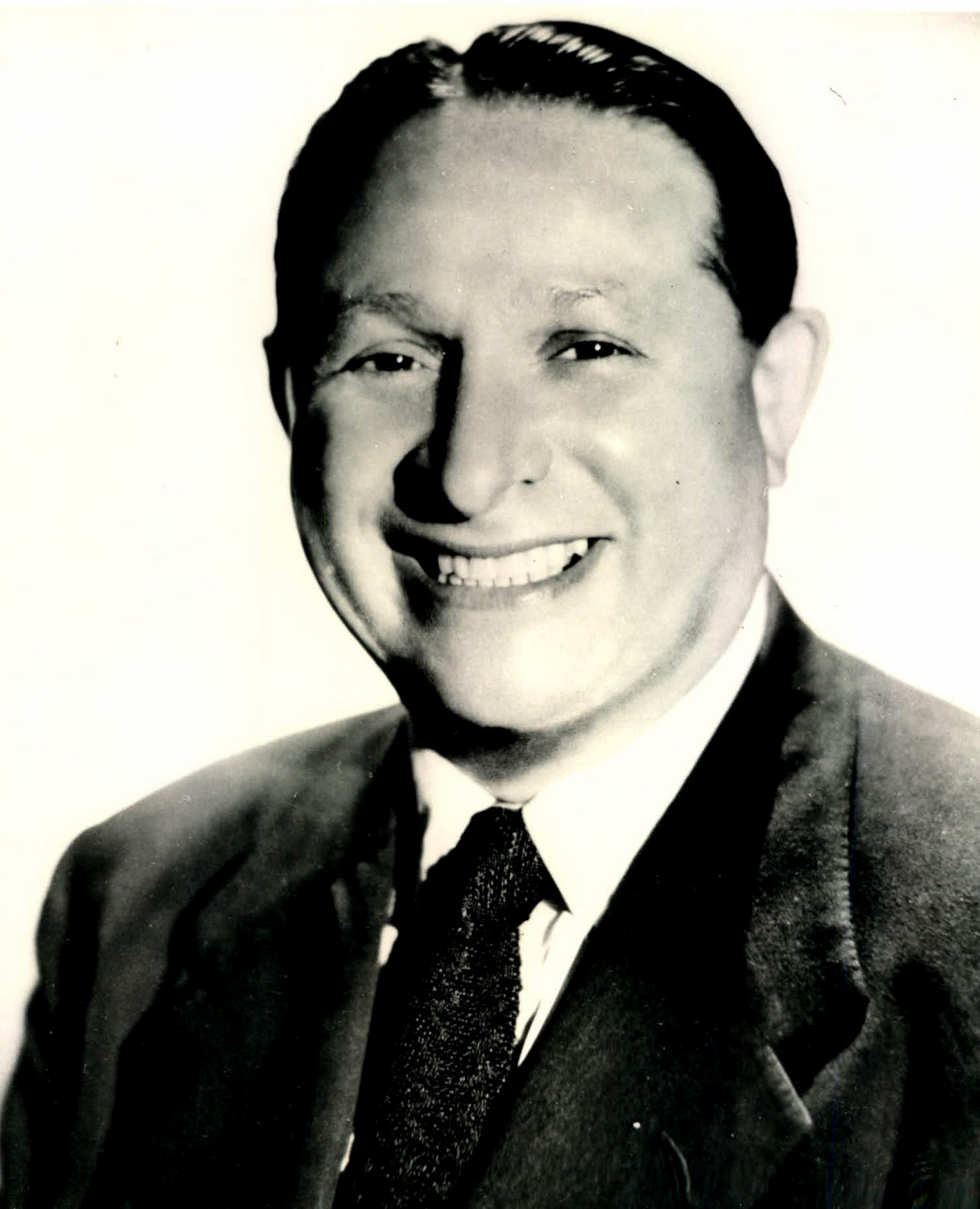
- Saperstein, c. 1950s
- Born: Abraham Michael Saperstein; July 4, 1902; London, England
- Died: March 15, 1966 (aged 63); Chicago, Illinois, U.S.
- Resting place: Westlawn Cemetery
- Occupations: Coach; basketball executive; businessman
- Known for: Owner of the Harlem Globetrotters; Commissioner of the American Basketball League
- Height: 5 ft 3 in (160 cm)
- Awards: Naismith Memorial Basketball Hall of Fame (1971); International Jewish Sports Hall of Fame (1979); National Jewish Sports Hall of Fame (2005)

Abraham Michael Saperstein (July 4, 1902 – March 15, 1966) was the founder, owner and earliest coach of the Harlem Globetrotters. Saperstein was a leading figure in black basketball and baseball from the 1920s through the 1950s, primarily before those sports were racially integrated.

Saperstein revolutionized the game of basketball and took the Globetrotters from an unknown team touring small farm towns in the Midwestern United States during the height of the Great Depression to a powerhouse that went on to beat the best team in the all-white National Basketball Association. He also introduced the three-point shot, which went on to become a mainstay of modern basketball.

Saperstein was elected to the Basketball Hall of Fame in 1971 and, at 5 ft 3 in (1.60 m), is its shortest male member. In 1979, he was inducted into the International Jewish Sports Hall of Fame and in 2005, he was inducted into the National Jewish Sports Hall of Fame.

== Early life ==
Saperstein was born in the East End of London, England, to a Jewish family originally from Łomża, Poland. His family moved from London to Chicago in 1907, when Abe was five years old. They settled just north of the city's Jewish area, often called the "Poor Jews' quarter" because of the many struggling immigrants living there. Saperstein's father, Louis, who had been an apprentice tailor in Poland, saw an ad for a tailor on Chicago's North Side in a predominantly German, Irish, and Swedish neighborhood. The ad warned "No Jews allowed" so Louis changed his surname to the more German-sounding Schneider, which is German for "tailor". After buying the business from the owner several years later, Louis dropped the façade and changed the name of the store to Louis Saperstein's Tailor Shop.

At age 10, Saperstein discovered a lifelong love of sports, playing basketball at the Wilson Avenue YMCA and second base for a parochial school team, though he attended the public Ravenswood Elementary School. At Lake View High School, he played nine different sports, including baseball, basketball, football, boxing, and track. Saperstein attended the University of Illinois, but dropped out to help support his family. He decided not to follow his father into tailoring. Instead, his dream was to pursue a career in sports, though he realized that his athletic abilities and height were not going to take him far.

Saperstein eventually landed a position working for the Chicago Park District as a playground supervisor at Welles Park, on Chicago's North Side. There, after hours of watching kids play basketball, he decided to create his own team, the Chicago Reds. The Chicago Reds were a semi-pro lightweight (135 lb limit) basketball team, and Saperstein played point guard.

As player, manager, and coach of the Chicago Reds, Saperstein met Walter Thomas Ball, a legendary baseball player in the Negro leagues, who had a black baseball team he wanted to send on tour in Illinois and southern Wisconsin. He hired Saperstein as his booking agent.

== Harlem Globetrotters career ==
Saperstein went on to become booking agent for several other basketball teams also, until branching out in the late 1920s to form his own team with some of the members of the Savoy Big Five. He called the team the New York Harlem Globetrotters. Although Saperstein's team had nothing to do with Harlem (they wouldn't play there until 1968), he chose the name to indicate that the players were black, as Harlem was the epicenter of African-American culture. Many of the towns where the Globetrotters played in their first few years were all white, and Saperstein did not want other teams or spectators to be surprised that his team was black.

The Globetrotters played their first game in Hinckley, Illinois. The team netted a grand total of $8, which was split evenly among the six members of the team, including Saperstein. Over the next several years, in the midst of the Great Depression, Saperstein served as the team's coach, driver, booking agent, PR director, and occasional substitute player. When a player was injured in a 1926 game, for example, Saperstein substituted into the game, prompting the Winona (Minnesota) News to report: "Four clean-limbed young colored men and a squat bandy-legged chap of Jewish extraction ... styled the Harlem Globetrotters, beat the Arcadia Military police ... 29 to 18."

During the early seasons, the Globetrotters needed to play every night just to make ends meet, because the team often netted less than $50 a night. Accommodations on the road were sparse and hotels often would not allow black patrons. On one occasion, when the players could not find a hotel in Des Moines, Iowa, they sneaked up the fire escape and slept in Saperstein's room. Saperstein was relentless in booking games; in the team's first seven years, the Globetrotters played more than 1,000 games, with Saperstein driving the players to tiny towns throughout the Midwest in his unheated Ford Model T.

From early on, the Globetrotters blended basketball with showmanship, but they were also talented basketball players, winning most of their games. In 1940, the Globetrotters beat the New York Renaissance.

An even bigger achievement came a few years later in the 1948 Globetrotters–Lakers game, when the Globetrotters defeated the Minneapolis Lakers, the best team in the all-white NBA, a league that had been formed two years earlier. The star of the Lakers was six-foot-ten George Mikan, nicknamed "Mr. Basketball". Despite the Lakers' significant height advantage and the team's billing as the best basketball team in the country, the underdog Globetrotters won the game 61–59, thanks to a dramatic long shot at the buzzer by Globetrotter Ermer Robinson. Afterward, in the locker room, the players hoisted Saperstein triumphantly on their shoulders.

The Globetrotters-Lakers game had taken place amid a sharp racial divide in sports. Many fans and team owners believed that black athletes were not coachable or intelligent enough to learn complicated plays, and lacked the competitive fire necessary for premier athletes. The victory, which was just shy of the Globetrotters' 3,000th victory in 21 seasons, proved that none of this was true and that African-American players had the skill and ability to play in the professional leagues.

In 1950, within two years of the Globetrotters-Lakers' game, the NBA integrated. Chuck Cooper, who had been a Globetrotter briefly, became the first black player to sign a contract with the NBA. Another two of the first black NBA players also were Globetrotters – Nat "Sweetwater" Clifton and Hank DeZonie.

Also in 1950, the Globetrotters played their first game in Madison Square Garden, marking the first time the venue sold out for a basketball game. Following these successes, interest in the Globetrotters grew and Saperstein created two more teams in the United States, as well as an international squad. The Globetrotters have now played in more than 123 countries and territories across the planet.

Even after the NBA integrated, top black players continued to play for the Globetrotters. In 1958, Wilt Chamberlain joined the Globetrotters for a year before going to the NBA and becoming its most dominant player. In a 1999 interview, Wilt Chamberlain said, "The fraternity of the Globetrotters was one of the most rewarding times of my life. I almost did not go into the NBA."

Two feature-length movies have been made about the Globetrotters, The Harlem Globetrotters (1951) and Go, Man, Go (1954), the latter starring Dane Clark and Sidney Poitier. Several documentaries have also told the Globetrotters' story, including The Harlem Globetrotters: The Team That Changed the World (2005), which featured Geese Ausbie, Larry Brown and Bill Bradley.

== Innovation of the three-point rule ==
Saperstein had ambitions of owning a team in the National Basketball Association and hoped to start a team in California. That hope was dashed when the NBA approved the move of the Lakers from Minneapolis to L.A. Saperstein was also denied ownership of the Warriors when the team moved from Philadelphia to San Francisco. Instead of sitting on the sidelines, Saperstein started the American Basketball League (ABL) in 1961 and served as its commissioner, as well as owner of the league's Chicago Majors team. To differentiate the ABL from the NBA – and to promote the new league – Saperstein introduced several innovations that have endured as features of modern basketball. He widened the free throw lane to 18 feet (from 12) and created the three-point shot. As commissioner of the short-lived ABL, Saperstein wanted a way to add excitement to the game and provide players with additional challenges. He hoped the three-pointer would become basketball's equivalent of the home run. "We must have a weapon," Saperstein said, "and this is ours".

To determine the distance the new shot line should be from the basket, Abe Saperstein and longtime DePaul University coach Ray Meyer went onto a court one day with tape and selected 25 feet as the right length. "They just arbitrarily drew lines," his son Jerry Saperstein said. "There's really no scientific basis. Just two Hall of Fame coaches getting together and saying: 'Where would we like to see the line?'" Not long after, in June 1961, Saperstein was traveling when the other seven ABL owners voted, 4–3, to officially shorten the line to 22 feet. Saperstein, who had significant power in the league as owner of the popular Globetrotters, disagreed with this and simply ignored the ruling. Games continued with the 25-foot shot. Saperstein eventually acknowledged there was one problem with the 25-foot arc and solved it by adding a 22-foot line in the corners. "It made for interesting possibilities," he wrote.

After the ABL shut down in 1963, the American Basketball Association made the three-pointer a central part of its image, creating enough competition for the NBA that the two leagues merged in 1976. The NBA adopted the 23 ft 9 in (7.24 m) shot in 1979. In 1994, it was moved to 22 feet, then changed back three seasons later, where it has stayed ever since.

== Other sports teams ==
Saperstein was a leading figure in the black baseball leagues. At various times, he owned the Chicago Brown Bombers, the Birmingham Black Barons, and the Cincinnati Crescents baseball teams. He also created several new leagues, including the Negro Midwest League and, in partnership with Olympic track and field star Jesse Owens, the West Coast Negro Baseball League.

When Saperstein's friend Bill Veeck took ownership of the Cleveland Indians in the late 1940s, he hired Saperstein as his chief scout for African-American players. At Saperstein's suggestion, Veeck eventually signed Luke Easter, Minnie Minoso, Suitcase Simpson, Satchel Paige, and Larry Doby, the American League's first black player.

Saperstein also founded the white New York Nationals baseball team and the Boston Brownskins, a basketball team that served as a minor league club for the Globetrotters. He also booked games for the Hong Wah Kues, a basketball team of Chinese Americans from San Francisco. Started in 1939 with six players, the Hong Wah Kues became known for their speed and quick passing. They played the Harlem Globetrotters once, and lost.

== Legacy ==
In a time of racial segregation and bigotry in professional sports, Saperstein showcased the talents of the nation's black basketball players. Four years after the all-white National Basketball Association (originally called the Basketball Association of America) was formed, black players were finally allowed into the league.

As the integrated NBA became recognized as the country's highest level of basketball, Saperstein focused the Globetrotters on entertainment, creating a popular act that played to audiences worldwide. In the years following World War II, the Globetrotters embarked on a "goodwill tour". Among the more memorable of those games took place in Berlin's Olympic Stadium and featured Jesse Owens, who was traveling with the team. Owens returned to the stadium where he had won four gold medals 15 years earlier, after which Hitler famously refused to shake his hand.

Although Saperstein worried about bringing the team into the racially charged atmosphere of Berlin, Owens and the Globetrotters were greeted by 75,000 cheering fans. The mayor of Berlin greeted Owens and famously said, "In 1936, Hitler refused to shake your hand. Today, I give you both of mine."

As the movement for civil rights progressed, some alleged that Saperstein did not do enough to advance the equality of his black players. In the 50s and 60s, some players resented that, due to the prejudice of hotel owners, they continued to be housed in "colored" hotels in black neighborhoods, while players on Saperstein's white teams supposedly stayed in first-class hotels. There was also discontent among some Globetrotters that Saperstein reportedly paid white players on his other teams higher salaries. Others criticized the Globetrotters for their on-court antics, saying they played into racial stereotypes. In 1978, however, Jesse Jackson said: "They did not show blacks as stupid. On the contrary, they were shown as superior...they were able to turn science into an art form." Meadowlark Lemon, who played with the Globetrotters from 1954 until 1979, also came to the Globetrotters's defense, saying that the team had "done more for the perception of black people, and the perception of America, than almost anything you could think of."

In 1999, the City of Chicago erected a historical marker dedicated to Saperstein in front of the home he lived in at 3828 N. Hermitage Ave. in the Lakeview neighborhood.

== Personal life ==
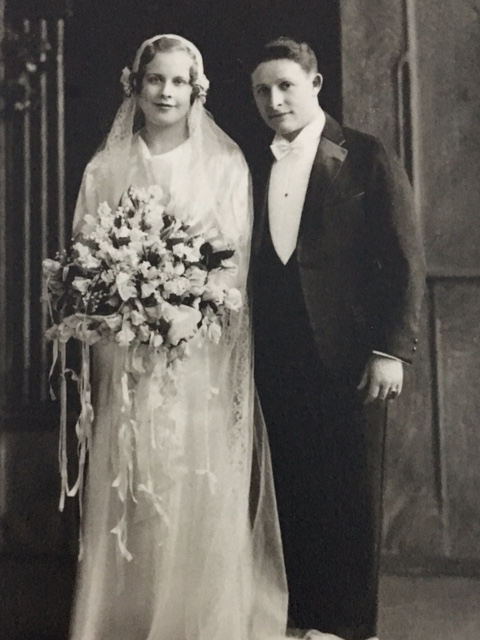
Abe Saperstein and Sylvia Franklin at their wedding in 1934

Saperstein was the eldest of nine children, several of whom were involved with the Globetrotters. In the early years, Saperstein's then-teenage brother Harry worked as a typist and secretary, sending out press releases and game schedules. His sister Fay, the youngest sibling, helped Abe with paperwork for years and ran the New York office in the 1950s. After Abe's death in March 1966, his brother Morry Saperstein assisted in running the business before it was sold to a group of Chicago businessmen for $3.7 million and eventually moved from Chicago to New York City.

On May 6, 1934, Saperstein married Sylvia Franklin from Chicago. They had two children, Jerry and Eloise. Jerry ran the international unit of the Globetrotters in the 1960s, founded the New York Sets, a charter franchise of World Team Tennis, and owned the San Francisco Shamrocks of the Pacific Hockey League. He then served as the first vice president at Madison Square Garden Corporation, reporting directly to the then-Chairman Sonny Werblin. Jerry died on November 16, 2021, two days after his 81st birthday. Jerry's two sons, Adam and Lanier Saperstein, and his daughter Sara Chana (Simone) Silverstein all live in the New York area. Lanier is a partner in the law firm of Dorsey & Whitney LLP. Eloise established a non-profit organization, the Abe Saperstein Foundation, designed to advance opportunities through sports for Chicago's youth, and she also was the first woman ever certified as an NBA player representative. She died on July 15, 2018, at the age of 81. Eloise's three children, Lonni, Avi and Abra, live in the Chicago area.

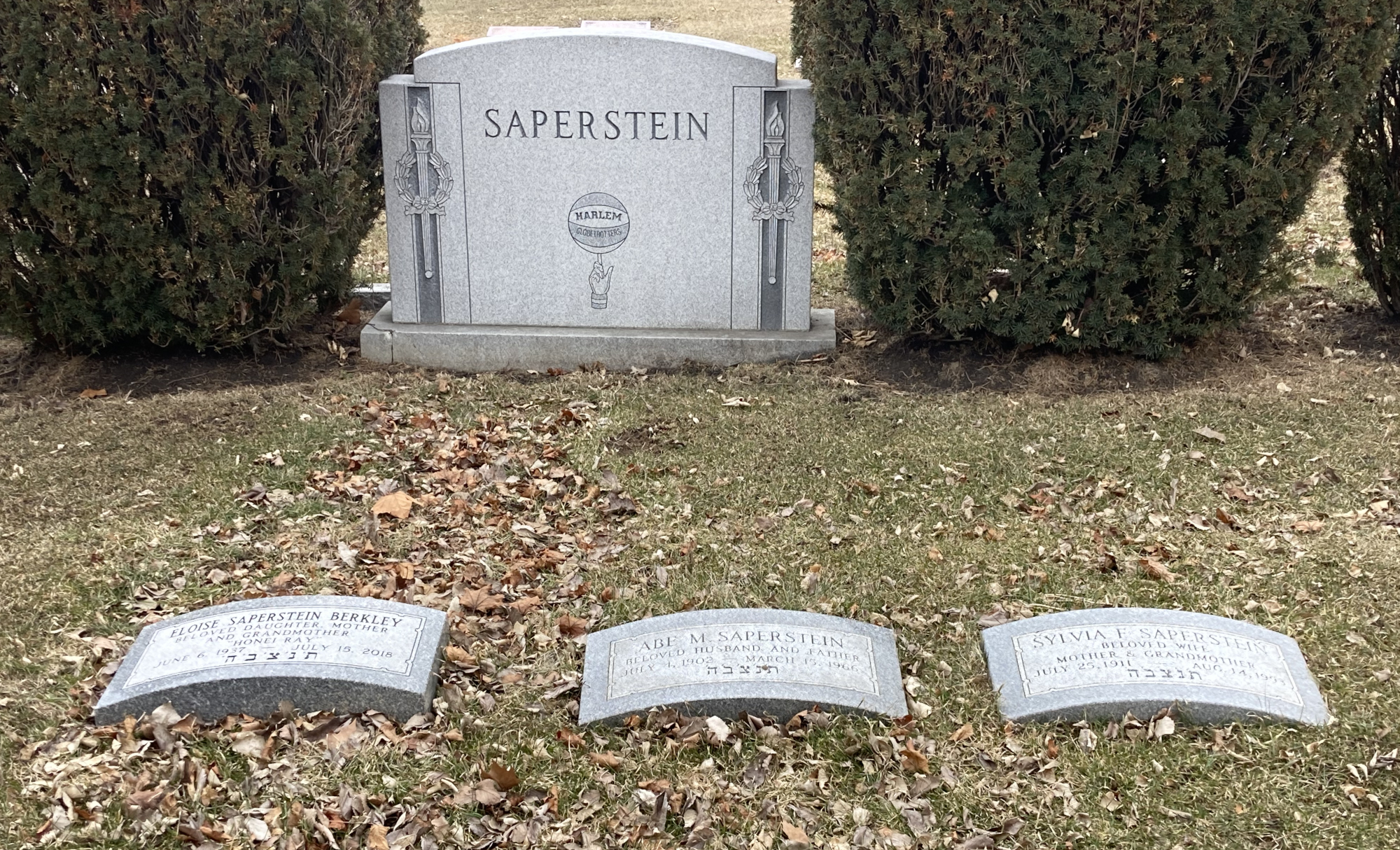
Saperstein's grave at Westlawn Cemetery

Saperstein was a tireless worker, taking off just one day a year, Yom Kippur. He continued to work right up until his death from a heart attack in March 1966. "He had more energy than the Grand Coulee Dam," wrote Chuck Menville in The Harlem Globetrotters: An Illustrated History. The news of Saperstein's death came as a shock to the Globetrotters. The team's star, Meadowlark Lemon, was on the road in Charlotte, North Carolina at the time. "My mouth went dry," Lemon said. "The boys cried. I had to force myself to be funny. I did it only because Abe would have wanted the show to go on." Saperstein is buried in the Westlawn Cemetery in Norridge, Illinois, near Chicago.

== See also ==
The first biography of Abe Saperstein, Globetrotter: How Abe Saperstein Shook Up the World of Sports, by Mark Jacob and Matthew Jacob, was published in October of 2024.
