= Pablo Robertson =

American basketball player (1944–1990)

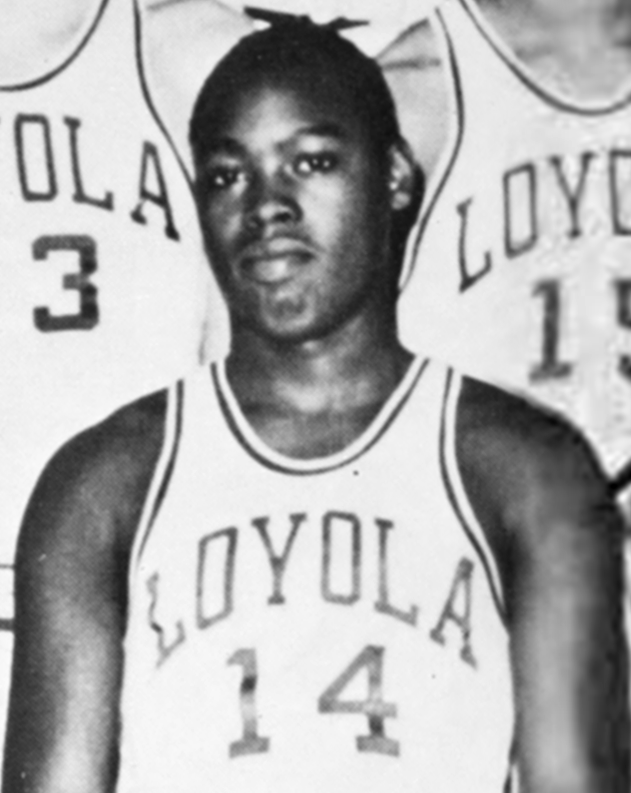
- Robertson with the Loyola Ramblers in 1962

Personal information
- Born: 1943 or 1944
- Died: June 23, 1990 (aged 46) Long Island, New York, U.S.
- Listed height: 5 ft 7 in (1.70 m)
- Listed weight: 160 lb (73 kg)

Career information
- High school: DeWitt Clinton (Bronx, New York)
- College: Loyola Chicago (1962–1963)
- NBA draft: 1965: undrafted
- Position: Guard
- Number: 14, 15

Paul "Pablo" Robertson (1944–1990) was an American professional basketball player and member of the Harlem Globetrotters. At college, Robertson played on the 1962–63 Loyola University Chicago squad that won the NCAA tournament, although Robertson was dropped in the middle of the season due to poor grades. He was named in ESPN's "Elite 24: Rucker Park legends".

== Early life ==
Pablo Robertson grew up in Harlem, New York, and played basketball at DeWitt Clinton High School. Although relatively short at a listed height of 5 feet 5 inches (1.65 m), he attracted attention with his ball-handling skills. Pete Axthelm described him as "a guard who could ignite playground crowds in a way that no bigger man could match."

== College career ==
Robertson matriculated to Loyola University Chicago in 1961. After a year on the freshman basketball team, he joined the varsity squad in 1962, by now listed at a height of 5 feet 9 inches (1.75 m).

On December 29, 1962, in a game between Loyola and Wyoming at the All-College Tournament in Oklahoma City, Loyola's starting point guard Jack Egan fouled out. When Robertson was put in to replace Egan, Loyola became the first major college team known to play five African-American players at the same time.

Along with teammate Billy Smith, Robertson did poorly in his classes during the first semester of his second year, and was ruled ineligible to continue playing on the basketball team. Egan recalls that he got four Fs and one D, and joked that "he put too much time into that one subject."

== After college ==
According to Loyola teammate Billy Smith, Robertson was drafted into the Army in the mid-1960s to serve in the Vietnam War. Smith said that serving in war greatly affected Robertson, and that he turned to alcohol and drugs when he returned.

After the war, Robertson joined the Harlem Globetrotters. As a Globetrotter, he was one of the animated characters on the Harlem Globetrotters Saturday morning cartoon on CBS. He was with the team for seven years.

Robertson died on June 23, 1990, at the age of 46 in a Long Island hospital.
