= Ermer Robinson =

American professional basketball player and coach (1922–1982)

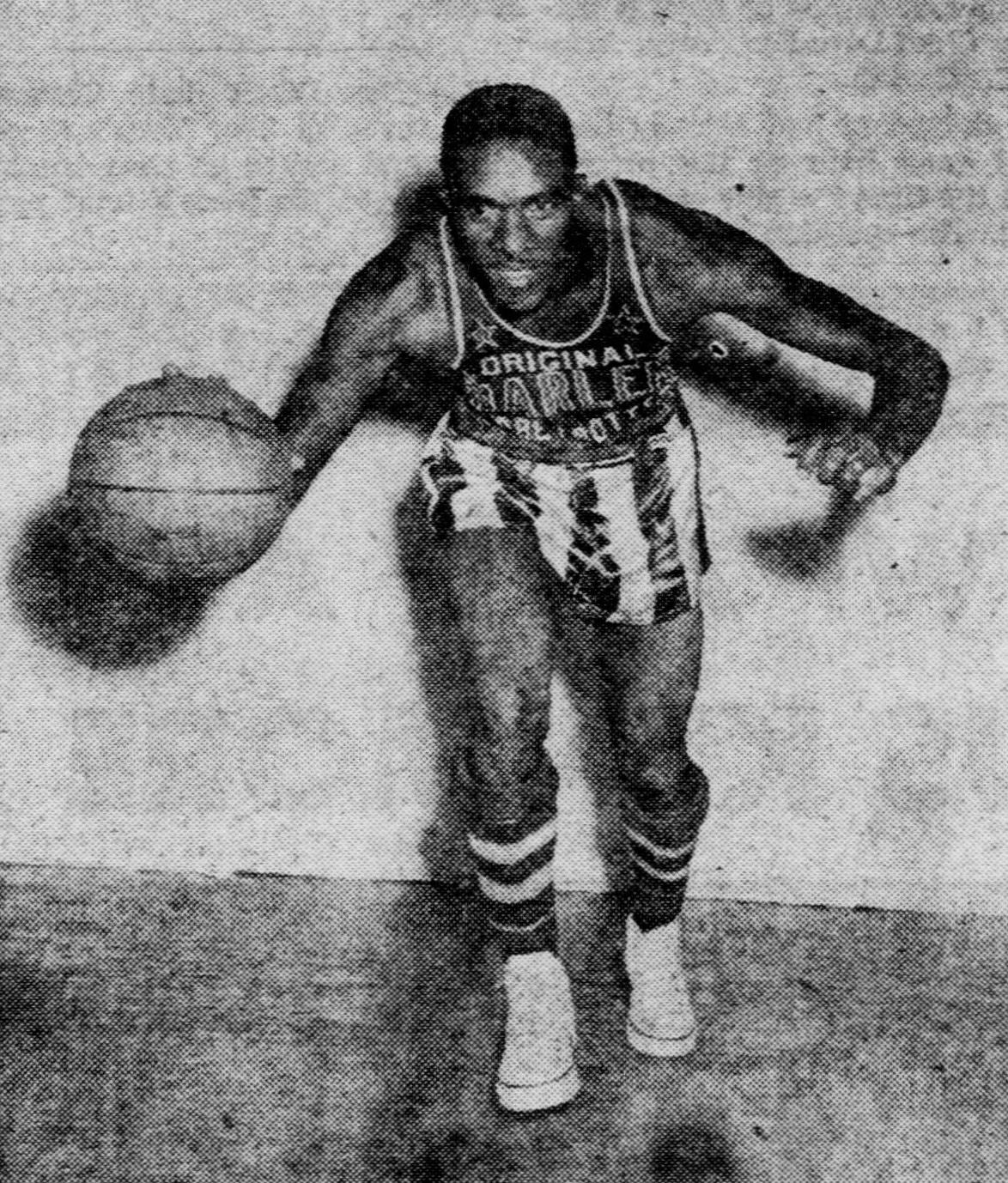
Elmer Robinson, circa 1955

Ermer B. Robinson (November 24, 1922 - December 29, 1982) was an American professional basketball player and coach.

He was a native of San Diego. He graduated from high school in 1942. Robinson was a member of the Harlem Globetrotters. Robinson shot the game-winning basket when the Globetrotters beat the Lakers in 1948.

Robinson was Head Coach of the Oakland Oaks and the general manager for the Chicago Majors, both of the American Basketball League. He was a coach for Oakland in 1962. He joined the US Army and then, after the Second World War ended, the Globetrotters. He died from cancer in 1982.
