= Curly Neal =

American basketball player (1942–2020)

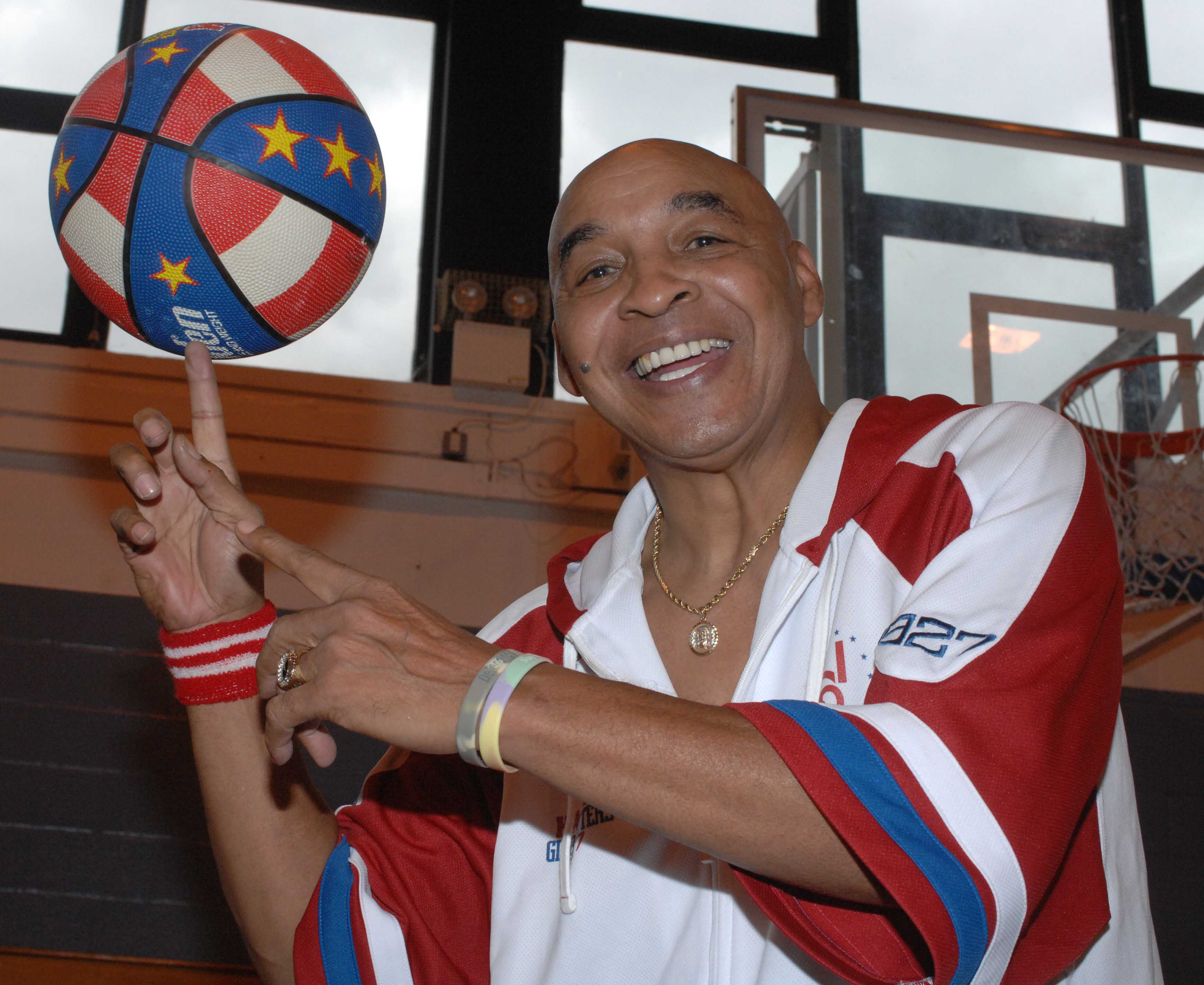
- Neal in 2008

Personal information
- Born: May 19, 1942 Greensboro, North Carolina, U.S.
- Died: March 26, 2020 (aged 77) Houston, Texas, U.S.
- Listed height: 6 ft 1 in (1.85 m)
- Listed weight: 162 lb (73 kg)

Career information
- High school: James B. Dudley (Greensboro, North Carolina)
- College: Johnson C. Smith (1959–1963)
- Playing career: 1963–1985
- Position: Point guard
- Number: 22

Career history
- 1963–1985: Harlem Globetrotters

Frederick "Curly" Neal (May 19, 1942 – March 26, 2020) was an American basketball player who played with the Harlem Globetrotters, instantly recognizable with his shaved bald head. Following in the footsteps of Marques Haynes, Neal became the Trotters' featured ballhandler, a key role in the team's exhibition act.

== Early life ==
Born in Greensboro, North Carolina, Neal attended James B. Dudley High School and Johnson C. Smith University in Charlotte, North Carolina from 1959 to 1963. At Smith, he averaged 23.1 points a game and was named All-Central Intercollegiate Athletic Association (CIAA) guard.

== Career ==
Neal played for 22 seasons (from 1963 to 1985) with the Globetrotters, appearing in more than 6,000 games in 97 countries. His shaved head earned him his nickname, a reference to the Three Stooges' Curly Howard, and made him one of the most recognizable Globetrotters. In the 1970s, an animated version of Neal starred with various other Globetrotters in the Hanna-Barbera animated cartoon Harlem Globetrotters as well as its spinoff, The Super Globetrotters. The animated Globetrotters also made three appearances in The New Scooby-Doo Movies. Neal himself appeared with Meadowlark Lemon, Marques Haynes, and his other fellow Globetrotters in a live-action Saturday morning TV show, The Harlem Globetrotters Popcorn Machine, in 1974–75, which also featured Rodney Allen Rippy and Avery Schreiber. Neal also appeared in The White Shadow, The Harlem Globetrotters on Gilligan's Island, and The Love Boat. Neal also starred in an episode of Superboy, playing a basketball coach.

On January 11, 2008, the Globetrotters announced that Neal's number 22 would be retired on February 15 in a special ceremony at Madison Square Garden as part of "Curly Neal Weekend." Neal was just the fifth Globetrotter in the team's 82-year history to have his number retired, joining Wilt Chamberlain (13), Meadowlark Lemon (36), Marques Haynes (20) and Goose Tatum (50). On January 31, 2008, it was announced that Neal would be inducted into the North Carolina Sports Hall of Fame.

He was also granted the Harlem Globetrotters' prestigious "Legends" ring, which is presented to those who make major humanitarian contributions and work for the Harlem Globetrotters organization.

== Personal life and death ==
A mural commemorating Neal's achievements both as a Globetrotter and his time playing for Dudley High School is painted in the basketball gym of the Hayes-Taylor Memorial YMCA at 1101 East Market Street in Greensboro. He had two daughters and six grandchildren. Neal lived in Houston with his fiancée Linda Ware until his death.

On March 26, 2020, Neal died at his home outside Houston at the age of 77. No cause of death was released, but Neal's health had been deteriorating in recent years following a stroke.
