= Twiggy Sanders =

American basketball player and coach

James "Twiggy" Sanders (born in Raleigh, North Carolina), is a retired American basketball player and coach. He played basketball at Ligon High School where he earned All-Conference, All-State and All-American honors.

Sanders went on to star at Johnson C. Smith University. He was voted to the CIAA All-Tournament team in 1973 and 1974. He received his B.S. in Physical Education in 1974.

Sanders later gained fame when in 1974 he joined the Harlem Globetrotters in which he played for 17 years, retiring from the team in 1991.

Since then Sanders become head basketball coach at Bonner Academy in Raleigh and also was head coach for two years with the Raleigh Cougars of the United States Basketball League (USBL). He later became an assistant coach for two years at Morris Brown College.

In 2004, Sanders became the first head coach of the American Basketball Association expansion team the Maryland Nighthawks. Twiggy is now a substitute teacher at Carnage Middle School

Twiggy has three children. Monty Jackson is currently the Director of Operations for the men's basketball team at Elon University in North Carolina.

Twiggy is also a substitute teacher at schools such as Carnage Middle School in Raleigh, NC. He once was the basketball coach at Carnage.
