= Rodney Allen Rippy =

American actor

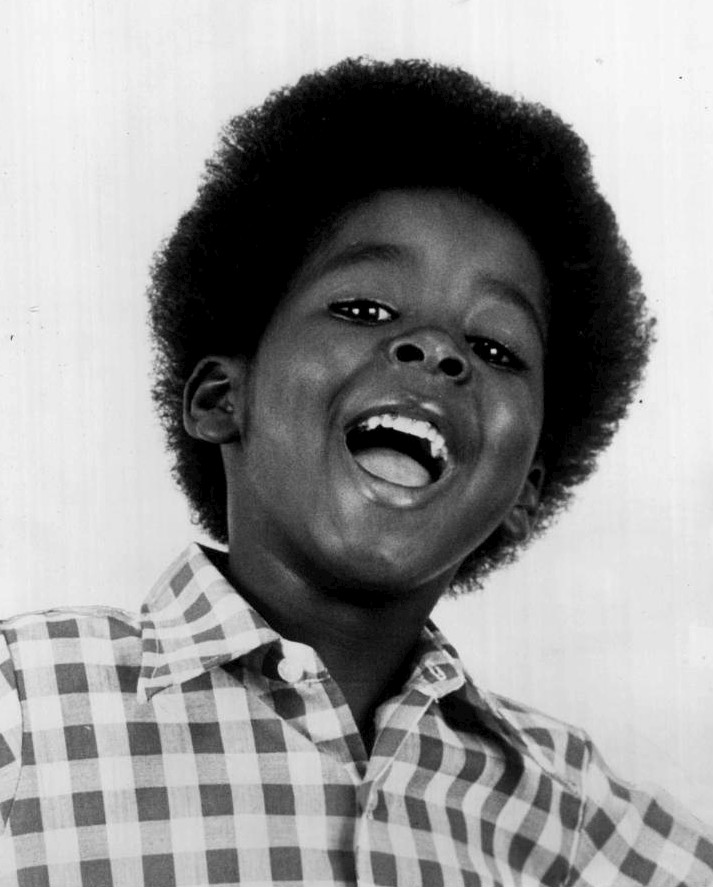
- Rippy in 1974.
- Born: July 29, 1968 (age 58); Long Beach, California, U.S.
- Education: California State University, Dominguez Hills
- Occupations: Child actor; television personality; producer; marketing director; politician

Rodney Allen Rippy (born July 29, 1968) is an American former child actor, television personality, marketing director, producer, and politician. He appeared in TV commercials for the fast-food chain Jack in the Box in the early 1970s, as well as in numerous roles in television and movies.

== Early career ==
In the Jack in the Box advertisements, Rippy was seen trying to wrap his mouth around the super-sized Jumbo Jack hamburger. The tag line "It's too big to eat!" (pronounced "It's too big-a-eat!") became a catchphrase. Another spot showed Rippy giggling while singing the song "Take Life a Little Easier," which was released as a single by Bell Records in the fall of 1973 in the wake of the commercial's popularity.

The single (b/w "World of Love") appeared on the Billboard magazine "Bubbling Under" chart in October 1973, peaking at #112. An LP, also titled Take Life a Little Easier (Bell 1311), was released in 1974.

Rippy subsequently had guest roles in many popular television shows, including The Six Million Dollar Man, Marcus Welby, M.D., Police Story, and The Odd Couple (in which Rippy played himself and was the owner of the building where Oscar Madison and Felix Unger lived). He also appeared frequently on talk shows such as The Tonight Show Starring Johnny Carson and Dinah's Place with Dinah Shore. Rippy also had a co-starring role on the CBS Saturday morning children's show The Harlem Globetrotters Popcorn Machine.

Rodney made his big screen debut (uncredited) in the Mel Brooks comedy Blazing Saddles in 1974 portraying a young Sheriff Bart. In a Peanuts newspaper comic strip dated July 3, 1974, Snoopy awakens from a dream in which he "had been invited out to dinner by Rodney Allen Rippy!"

== Later career ==
Rippy graduated from Cerritos College in 1990 and California State University, Dominguez Hills in 1995 where he majored in marketing. In 2000 he opened his own marketing firm which he named Ripped Marketing Group. He worked on campaigns such as promoting leisure wear and country music, among other projects. He has taken on a few acting roles since his childhood stardom, filming a few episodes of Parker Lewis Can't Lose in the early 1990s, appearing in the 1997 independent film Former Child Star and the 2003 David Spade comedy Dickie Roberts: Former Child Star.

Rippy is a partner in the film production company Bow Tie Productions, and spokesman for Hurricane Housing Relief. He worked at KABC-TV in Los Angeles, California. A resident of Carson, California, he has served as master of ceremonies for the Carson Relay For Life (Rippy's mother died of cancer in 1986). He was at one time a national director of marketing with Metro Networks (Westwood One).

== Political candidacy ==
In 2015 Rippy was a candidate for mayor of Compton, California. He was eliminated by finishing 10th out of 12 candidates in the election's primary.

== Partial filmography ==
Year	Title	Role	Notes
1974	Blazing Saddles	Bart - Age 5	Uncredited
1976	The Six Million Dollar Man	Earnest Cook	Episode: “The Blue Flash”
1976	Police Story	Jeb	Episode: "50 Cents First Half Hour, $1.75 All Day"
1980	Vega$	Boy	Episode: “The Hunter Hunted”
1980	Oh, God! Book II	Charlie	
1997	Former Child Star	Himself	
2003	Checking the Gate		
2003	Dickie Roberts: Former Child Star	Himself - cameo	
2015	Flowers in the Snow-FTP		
2016	To the Top		
