= Harlem Globetrotters =

American exhibition basketball team

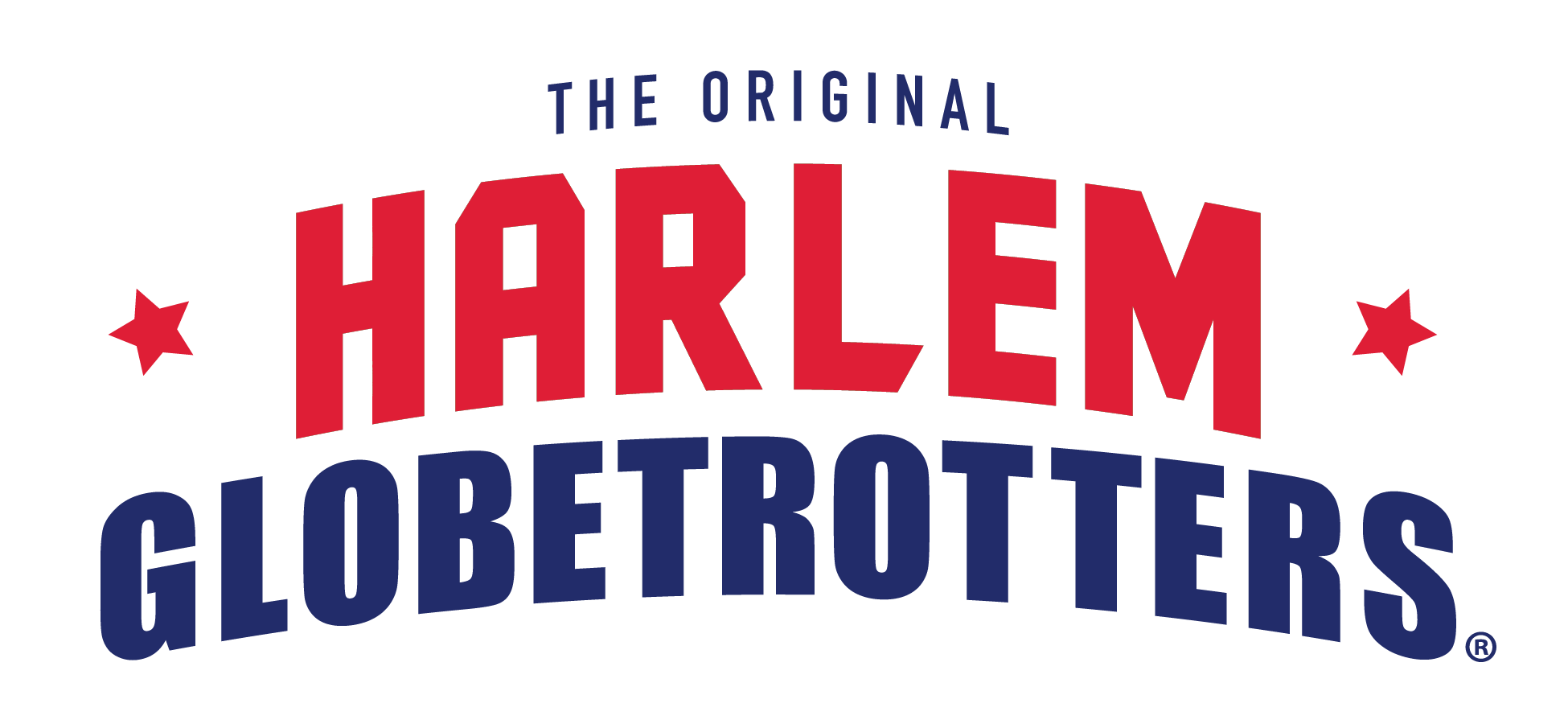
- Leagues: Independent
- Founded: 1926; 100 years ago
- History: 1926–27: Chicago GlobeTrotters / Savoy Big Five; 1928–29: New York Harlem Globetrotters; 1929–present: Harlem Globetrotters
- Arena: Barnstorming team
- Team colors: Red, white, blue
- Head coach: "Sweet" Lou Dunbar (coach); Barry Hardy (coach)
- Ownership: Herschend
- Championships: 75, including the 1940 WPBT
- Website: harlemglobetrotters.com
| Primary | Secondary |

The Harlem Globetrotters are an American exhibition basketball team. They combine athleticism, theater, and comedy in their entertaining style of play. Over the years, the Globetrotters have played more than 26,000 exhibition games in 124 countries and territories, mostly against deliberately ineffective opponents, such as the Washington Generals (1953–1995, 2007–2015, 2017–present) and the New York Nationals (1995–2006). The team's signature song is Brother Bones' whistled version of "Sweet Georgia Brown", and their mascot is an anthropomorphized globe named "Globie". The team is owned by Herschend.

== History ==
The Harlem Globetrotters originated in 1926 at the Giles American Legion Post #87, on the South Side of Chicago, where all the original players were raised and went to Wendell Phillips High school in the Bronzeville neighborhood. Their first season of existence saw them get a 101–16 record. Their first match in which they began their globetrotting ways started with a 48-mile-long road trip from Chicago to Hinckley, Illinois in an uncomfortable Ford Model T with a tattered road map. They were paid $75. They began as the Savoy Big Five (which held Walter "Toots" Wright, Byron "Fats" Long, Willis "Kid" Oliver, Andy Washington, and Al "Runt" Pullins as their inaugural Globetrotters players from that period of time), one of the premier attractions of the Savoy Ballroom; starting in January 1928, a basketball team of Black American players played exhibitions before dances to prop up the ballroom's cratering attendance numbers. In 1928, several players left the team in a dispute. That autumn, those players formed a team called the "Globe Trotters" and toured southern Illinois that spring. Abe Saperstein became involved with the team as a coach, manager, promoter and part-time player. By 1928, Saperstein was touring Illinois and Iowa with his basketball team called the "New York Harlem Globe Trotters", although they later decided to shorten the name to the more well-known "Harlem Globetrotters" (sometimes spelled as "Globe Trotters" in their early history) by the following year in 1929. Saperstein selected the name Harlem because it was then considered the center of Black American culture and the contraction Globetrotter to mythologize the team's international venues. While they would start being a comedic basketball team by 1929 with the addition of Inman Jackson on their roster, it wouldn't be until 1935 where they would begin to be more recognized throughout the nation when the Globetrotters would get the Original Celtics franchise to forfeit a match (by having them call a timeout and then leave the game not long afterward) as opposed to risking defeat after they were tied 32–32 with two minutes remaining in the game.

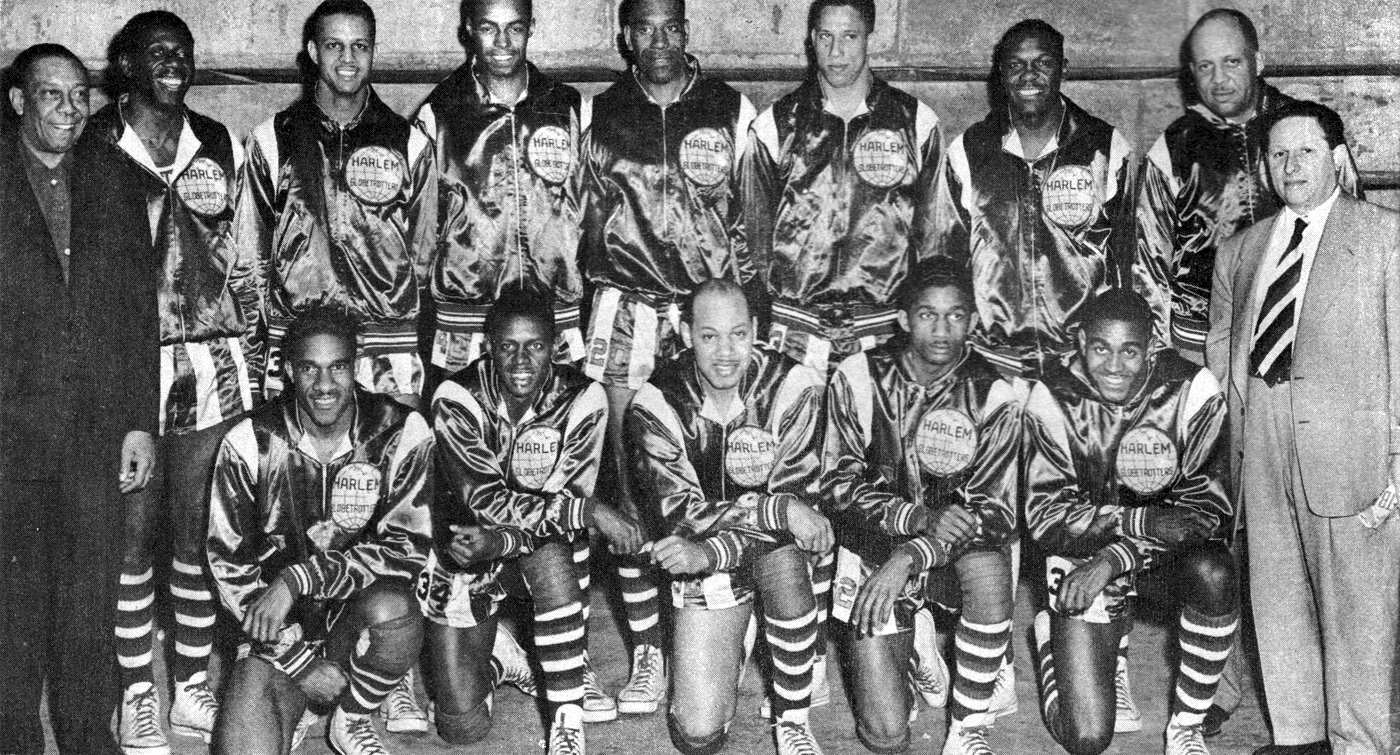
The 1950 World Series Harlem Globetrotters, with owner Abe Saperstein (right) and team secretary W. S. Welch (left)

The Globetrotters were perennial participants in the World Professional Basketball Tournament, first competing in the inaugural 1939 World Professional Basketball Tournament following their first international foray with a tour in Mexico before later winning it all by the following year's event in 1940. In a heavily attended matchup a few years later, best known as the 1948 Globetrotters–Lakers game, the Globetrotters made headlines when they beat one of the best white basketball teams in the country, the Minneapolis Lakers. The Globetrotters continued to easily win games due to Harlem monopolizing the entire talent pool of the best black basketball players in the country. Once one of the most famous teams in the country, the Globetrotters were eventually eclipsed by the rise of the National Basketball Association (NBA), particularly when NBA teams began recruiting black players in the 1950s. In 1950, Harlem Globetrotter Chuck Cooper became the first black player to be drafted in the NBA by the Boston Celtics, and teammate Nat "Sweetwater" Clifton became the first black player to sign an NBA contract when the New York Knicks purchased his contract from the Globetrotters for $12,500 (equivalent to $167,000 in 2025). Despite the eclipse, the Globetrotters would still see success as an independently ran franchise long after the NBA stopped relying on the Globetrotters as an attention grabber for certain matches on what could be seen as "doubleheader" nights on their ends.

The Globetrotters gradually worked comic routines into their act—a direction the team has credited to Reece "Goose" Tatum, who joined in 1941—and eventually became known more for entertainment than sports. The Globetrotters' acts often feature incredible coordination and skillful handling of one or more basketballs, such as passing or juggling balls between players, balancing or spinning balls on their fingertips, and making unusually difficult shots.

In 1952, the Globetrotters invited Louis "Red" Klotz to create a team to accompany them on their tours. This team, the Washington Generals (who also played under various other names), became the Globetrotters' primary opponents. The Generals are effectively stooges for the Globetrotters, with the Globetrotters handily defeating them in thousands of games.

The Harlem Globetrotters in the Netherlands (1958)

In 1959, Saperstein received an invitation from Vasily Grigoryevich, the director of Lenin Central Stadium, and the Globetrotters played nine games in Moscow. The team, which included Wilt Chamberlain, was welcomed enthusiastically by spectators and authorities, and they met Premier Nikita Khrushchev and collectively received the Athletic Order of Lenin medal.

According to one report titled "Russians Baffled by Harlem Fun", however, spectators were initially confused: "A Soviet audience of 14,000 sat almost silently, as if in awe, through the first half of the game. It warmed up slightly in the second half when it realized the Trotters are more show than competition." The Globetrotters brought their own opponent—not the Washington Generals, but the San Francisco Chinese Basketeers. A review in state-run Pravda stated, "This is not basketball; it is too full of tricks" but praised the Globetrotters' skills and suggested that "they have some techniques to show us".

The American press—particularly Drew Pearson—made note of the fact that the Globetrotters were paid (per game) the equivalent of $4,000 (equivalent to $44,000 in 2025) by the Soviet government, which could be spent only in Moscow. The games were used as evidence that U.S.–Russian relations were improving, that Moscow was backing off its propaganda campaign aimed at American race relations, and that the Russian society was becoming more capitalist (Pearson suggested that the games were held because Lenin Stadium needed money).

In May 1967, New York City–based Metromedia announced that it would acquire the Globetrotters for $1 million (equivalent to $10 million in 2025), but the deal was never completed and the team was sold to George N. Gillett Jr., who formed a new company called Globetrotter Communications in 1968.

Nine years after the company's attempted acquisition, in 1976, Metromedia announced that it would acquire the Globetrotters for $11 million (equivalent to $62 million in 2025) from Globetrotter Communications.

Many famous basketball players have played for the Globetrotters. Greats such as "Wee" Willie Gardner, Connie "the Hawk" Hawkins, Wilt "the Stilt" Chamberlain, and Nat "Sweetwater" Clifton later joined the NBA. The Globetrotters signed their first female player, Olympic gold medalist Lynette Woodard, in 1985.

Because nearly all of the team's players have been black, and as a result of the buffoonery involved in many of the Globetrotters' skits, they drew some criticism during the Civil Rights era. The players were accused by some civil-rights advocates of "Tomming for Abe", a reference to Uncle Tom and owner Abe Saperstein. However, prominent civil rights activist Jesse Jackson (who would later be named an honorary Globetrotter) came to their defense by stating, "I think they've been a positive influence... They did not show blacks as stupid. On the contrary, they were shown as superior."

In 1986, as part of the spin-off of Metromedia's television stations to Rupert Murdoch and the 20th Century Fox film studio, the company sold the Globetrotters and the Ice Capades to the Minneapolis-based International Broadcasting Corporation (owners of KTAB-TV in Abilene, Texas and controlled by Thomas Scallen) for $30 million (equivalent to $88 million in 2025).

In 1993, former Globetrotters player Mannie Jackson purchased the team from the International Broadcasting Corporation, which was on the verge of bankruptcy.

In 1995, Orlando Antigua became the first Hispanic player on the team. He was the first non-black player on the Globetrotters' roster since Bob Karstens played with the squad in 1942–43.

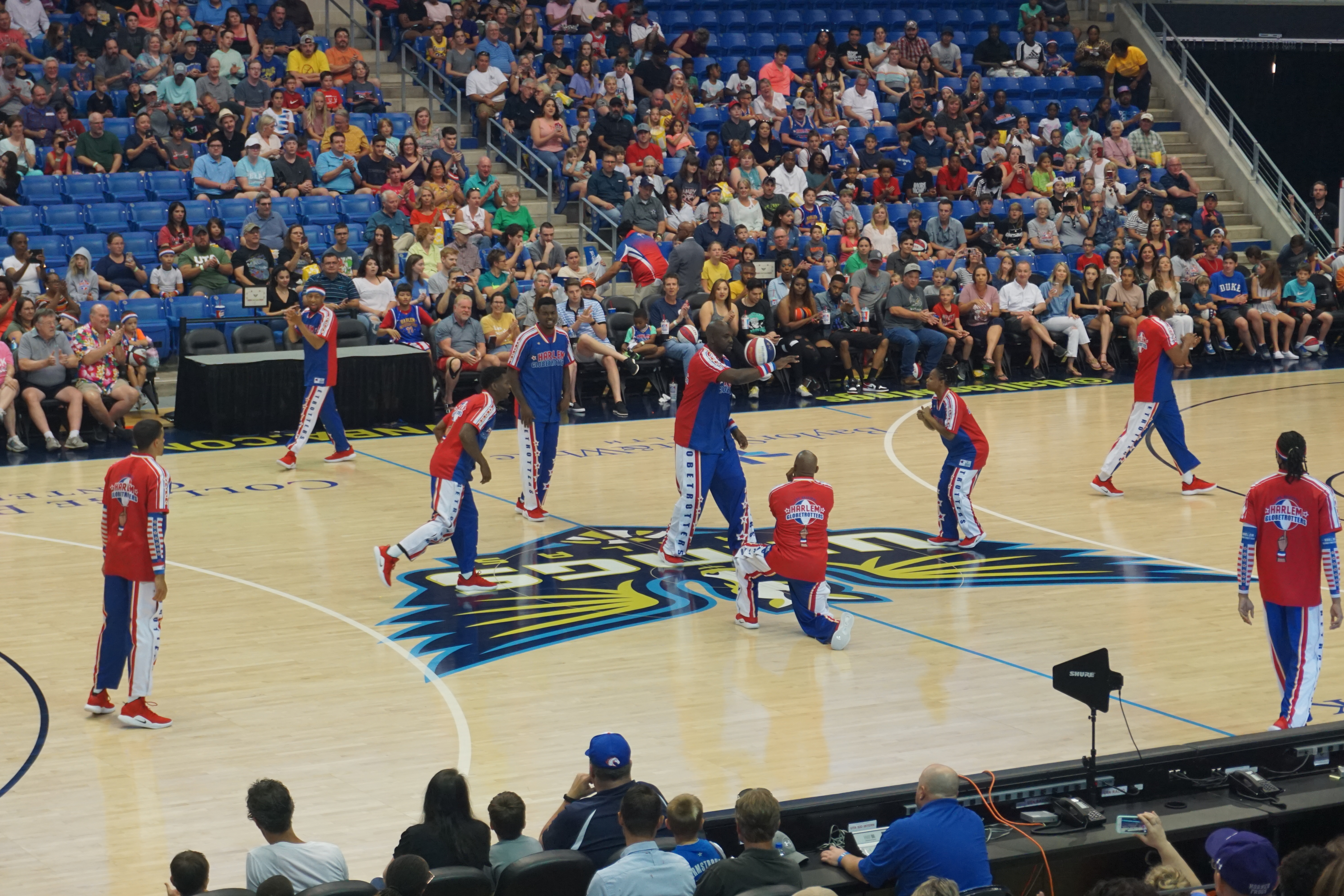
The Globetrotters' Magic Circle in 2019

While parts of a modern exhibition game are pre-planned, the games themselves are not fixed. While their opponents do not interfere with the Globetrotters' hijinks while on defense, they play a serious game when in possession of the ball, and about 20 to 30 percent of a game is "real". This once led to an infamous 100-99 overtime defeat at the hands of the New Jersey Reds on January 5, 1971, much to the distress of the watching crowd. The Globetrotters lost track of the score and were facing a 12-point deficit with two minutes remaining, and after the Globetrotters took a one-point lead late, the Reds made a game-winning shot with a few seconds remaining and won.

In September 2005, Shamrock Holdings purchased 80% stake in the Globetrotters.

In October 2013, Herschend Family Entertainment announced that it would acquire the Globetrotters from Shamrock Holdings.

In June 2021, the Globetrotters filed a petition to join the National Basketball Association (NBA) as an expansion franchise.

== Roster ==
2025 Harlem Globetrotters roster
Players

| Pos. | No. | Player | Height | Weight | DOB | From |
|---|---|---|---|---|---|---|
| G | 0 | Justin "X-Over" Tompkins | 4 ft 6 in (1.37 m) | | | Borough of Manhattan CC |
| F | 1 | Arysia "Ace" Porter | 5 ft 6 in (1.68 m) | | | St. Mary's (TX) |
| G | 3 | Darnell "Speedy" Artis | 5 ft 7 in (1.70 m) | | | Gwynedd Mercy |
| G | 4 | Tyriek "Shake" Railey | 5 ft 11 in (1.80 m) | | | Virginia Union |
| F | 5 | Chandler "Bulldog" Mack | 6 ft 7 in (2.01 m) | | | Freed–Hardeman |
| G | 6 | Eryka "Spice" Sidney | 5 ft 5 in (1.65 m) | | | Houston |
| G | 7 | Lucius "Too Tall" Winston | 5 ft 10 in (1.78 m) | | | Tuskegee |
| G | 8 | Kaylin "Sunshine" West | 5 ft 5 in (1.65 m) | | | Georgetown |
| G | 9 | Jahmani "Hot Shot" Swanson | 4 ft 5 in (1.35 m) | | | Monroe |
| G | 10 | Cherelle "Torch" George | 5 ft 3 in (1.60 m) | 132 lb (60 kg) | 1984-11-27 | Purdue |
| G | 11 | Brawley "Cheese" Chisholm | 6 ft 2 in (1.88 m) | | | Ball State |
| F | 12 | Jason "Buckets" Barrera | 6 ft 3 in (1.91 m) | | | Mount Saint Vincent |
| F | 17 | Travion "Diesel" Kirkendoll | 6 ft 2 in (1.88 m) | | | Centenary |
| G | 18 | Fatima "TNT" Lister | 5 ft 6 in (1.68 m) | | | Temple |
| G | 21 | Carl "Lights Out" Garcia | 6 ft 2 in (1.88 m) | | | Miles |
| F | 23 | Corey "Thunder" Law | 6 ft 3 in (1.91 m) | | | High Point |
| F | 24 | Marlow "Dragon" Gilmore | 6 ft 6 in (1.98 m) | | | Francis Marion |
| F | 25 | Malik "Prime Time" Moore | 6 ft 4 in (1.93 m) | | | USC Upstate |
| F | 27 | Cameron "Silk" Burrell | 6 ft 7 in (2.01 m) | | | Lindenwood |
| F | 28 | Joe "Jumpin" Ballard | 6 ft 6 in (1.98 m) | | | Glenville State |
| G | 29 | Evan "Swish" Gaffney | 6 ft 5 in (1.96 m) | | | Tennessee Wesleyan |
| F | 30 | Julian "Zeus" McClurkin | 6 ft 8 in (2.03 m) | | | North Carolina A&T |
| F | 31 | Donte "Hammer" Harrison | 6 ft 9 in (2.06 m) | | | Hampton |
| G | 32 | Latif "Jet" Rivers | 6 ft 1 in (1.85 m) | | | Wagner |
| G | 33 | William "Bull" Bullard | 6 ft 4 in (1.93 m) | | | Texas A&M–Corpus Christi |
| F | 38 | Mark "Splash" Blount Jr. | 6 ft 6 in (1.98 m) | | | Neumann |
| F | 39 | Marcus "Bones" Driscoll | 6 ft 6 in (1.98 m) | | | Montgomery College |
| G | 40 | Rock "Wham" Middleton | 5 ft 7 in (1.70 m) | | | Savannah State |
| F | 41 | Louis "Sweet Lou II" Dunbar | 6 ft 3 in (1.91 m) | | | Oklahoma City |
| F | 42 | Angelo "Spider" Sharpless | 6 ft 4 in (1.93 m) | | | Elizabeth City State |
| F | 44 | Prince "Baller" Moss | 6 ft 6 in (1.98 m) | | | Grambling State |
| F | 45 | Alex "Moose" Weekes | 6 ft 8 in (2.03 m) | | | Middle Tennessee |
| F | 46 | Gwarren "Tree" Douglas | 6 ft 7.5 in (2.02 m) | | | Clark Atlanta |
| F | 47 | Joey "Hot Rod" De La Rosa | 7 ft 1 in (2.16 m) | | | St. John's |
| G | 48 | Paweł "Dazzle" Kidoń | 5 ft 11 in (1.80 m) | | | Zubrzyca Dolna, Poland |
| F | 49 | Asanti "Cash" Price | 6 ft 5 in (1.96 m) | | | Benedict |
| F | 51 | Andrew "Big Dog" Whitsett | 7 ft 1 in (2.16 m) | | | Cal State Dominguez Hills |
| F | 53 | Jarius "Dynamite" Key | 6 ft 5 in (1.96 m) | | | Campbellsville |
| F | 54 | Brandon "Hi-Rise" Mitchell | 6 ft 6 in (1.98 m) | | | San José State |
| F | 55 | Randy "Crash" McClure | 6 ft 4 in (1.93 m) | | | Albany State |
| F | 56 | Zavian "Sky" Jackson | 6 ft 3 in (1.91 m) | | | Arkansas–Pine Bluff |
| G | 58 | Max "Hops" Pearce | 6 ft 0 in (1.83 m) | | | Purchase College |

Coaches
Head coach
- Vacant

Legend
- (DP) Unsigned draft pick
- (FA) Free agent
- (S) Suspended
- Injured

Roster
Updated: 2024-12-13

== Draft ==
Starting in 2007, the Globetrotters have conducted an annual "draft" a few days before the NBA draft, in which they select players they feel fit the mold of a Globetrotter. Being drafted by the Globetrotters does not guarantee a spot on the team, although several drafted players have gone on to become Globetrotters: Anthony "Ant" Atkinson (2007), Brent Petway (2007), William "Bull" Bullard (2008), Tay "Firefly" Fisher (2008), Charlie Coley III (2009), Paul "Tiny" Sturgess (2011), Jacob "Hops" Tucker (2011), Darnell "Spider" Wilks (2011), Bryan "B-Nice" Narcisse (2012), Tyrone Davis (2013), Corey "Thunder" Law (2013), Tyler "Iceman" Inman (2014) Devan "Beast" Douglas (2016), and AJ "Money" Merriweather.

Other notable draft picks by the Globetrotters include Sun Mingming (2007), Patrick Ewing Jr. (2008), Sonny Weems (2008), Taylor Griffin (2009), Tim Howard (2009), Mark Titus (2010), Lionel Messi (2011), Jordan McCabe, then 12 years old (2011), Andrew Goudelock (2011), Usain Bolt (2012), Mariano Rivera (2013), Brittney Griner (2013), Johnny Manziel (2014), Landon Donovan (2014), Mo'ne Davis (2015), Dude Perfect (2015), Kevin Hart (2016), Neymar (2016), Missy Franklin (2016), Jordan Spieth (2016), Craig Sager (2016), Gal Gadot (2017), Aaron Judge (2017), Tim Tebow (2017), Paul Pogba (2018), Joe Kilgore (2018), Hafþór Júlíus Björnsson (2018), Mahershala Ali (2019), Mookie Betts (2020), and Chadwick Boseman (2020).

== Film and television ==
Beginning with their eponymous 1951 film, the Globetrotters have frequently appeared or been referenced in film and television.

| Year | Title | Players | Notes |
|---|---|---|---|
| 1951 | The Harlem Globetrotters | Roscoe Cumberland; William 'Pop' Gates; Marques Haynes; Louis 'Babe' Pressley; Ermer Robinson; Ted Strong; Reece 'Goose' Tatum; Frank Washington; Clarence Wilson | |
| 1966 | The Ed Sullivan Show | | |
| 1970–1971 | Harlem Globetrotters | Bobby Joe Mason (voiced by: Eddie "Rochester" Anderson); Curly Neal (voiced by: Stu Gilliam); Meadowlark Lemon (voiced by: Scatman Crothers); Geese Ausbie (voiced by: Johnny Williams); J.C. Gipson (voiced by: Richard Elkins); Pablo Robertson (voiced by: Robert DoQui) | Animated Globetrotters voiced by professional voice actors |
| 1972–1973 | The New Scooby-Doo Movies | Bobby Joe Mason (voiced by: Eddie "Rochester" Anderson); Curly Neal (voiced by: Stu Gilliam); Meadowlark Lemon (voiced by: Scatman Crothers); Geese Ausbie (voiced by: Johnny Williams); J.C. Gipson (voiced by: Richard Elkins); Pablo Robertson (voiced by: Robert DoQui) | The same cast carried over from the 1970 series. Episodes: s1 ep12: "The Ghostly Creep from the Deep"; s1 ep16: "The Loch Ness Mess"; s2 ep1: "Mystery of Haunted Island" |
| 1974 | The Harlem Globetrotters Popcorn Machine | Meadowlark Lemon; Marques Haynes; Charles "Tex" Harrison; Geese Ausbie; Nate Branch; Curly Neal; Theodis "Wolfman" Lee; John Smith; Bobby Joe Mason | |
| 1981 | The Harlem Globetrotters on Gilligan's Island | Geese Ausbie; Curly Neal; Twiggy Sanders; Louis Dunbar; Nate Branch; Clyde Austin; Jimmy Blacklock; Charles "Tex" Harrison; Theodis "Wolfman" Lee; Bobby Joe Mason; Robert Paige; Dallas Thornton | |
| 1996 | Hangin' with Mr. Cooper | | Episodes: s4 ep16: "Globetrotters" |
| 1999–present | Futurama | | All Globetrotters portrayed are fictional. Episodes: s3 ep14: "Time Keeps on Slippin'"; s3 ep22: "The 30% Iron Chef"; s4 ep4: "Less than Hero"; s4 ep5: "A Taste of Freedom"; Futurama: Bender's Big Score; Futurama: The Beast with a Billion Backs; Futurama: Into the Wild Green Yonder; s6 ep8: "That Darn Katz!"; s6 ep10: "The Prisoner of Benda"; s7 ep19: "Saturday Morning Fun Pit" |
| 2005 | Harlem Globetrotters: The Team that Changed the World | Geese Ausbie; John Chaney; Connie Hawkins; Mannie Jackson | |
| 2009 | Hell's Kitchen | Herbert "Flight Time" Lang; Kevin "Special K" Daley; Nathaniel "Big Easy" Lofton; Eugene "Wildkat" Edgerson; Scooter Christiansen | Season 5, Episode 6 |
| 2012 | Goose | Reece 'Goose' Tatum; Mannie Jackson | An ESPN Films documentary |
| 2023 | Sweetwater | Nat Clifton (portrayed by Everett Osborne); Reece 'Goose' Tatum (portrayed by Kevin Daley | |

== Retired numbers ==
The Globetrotters have honored eight players by retiring their numbers:

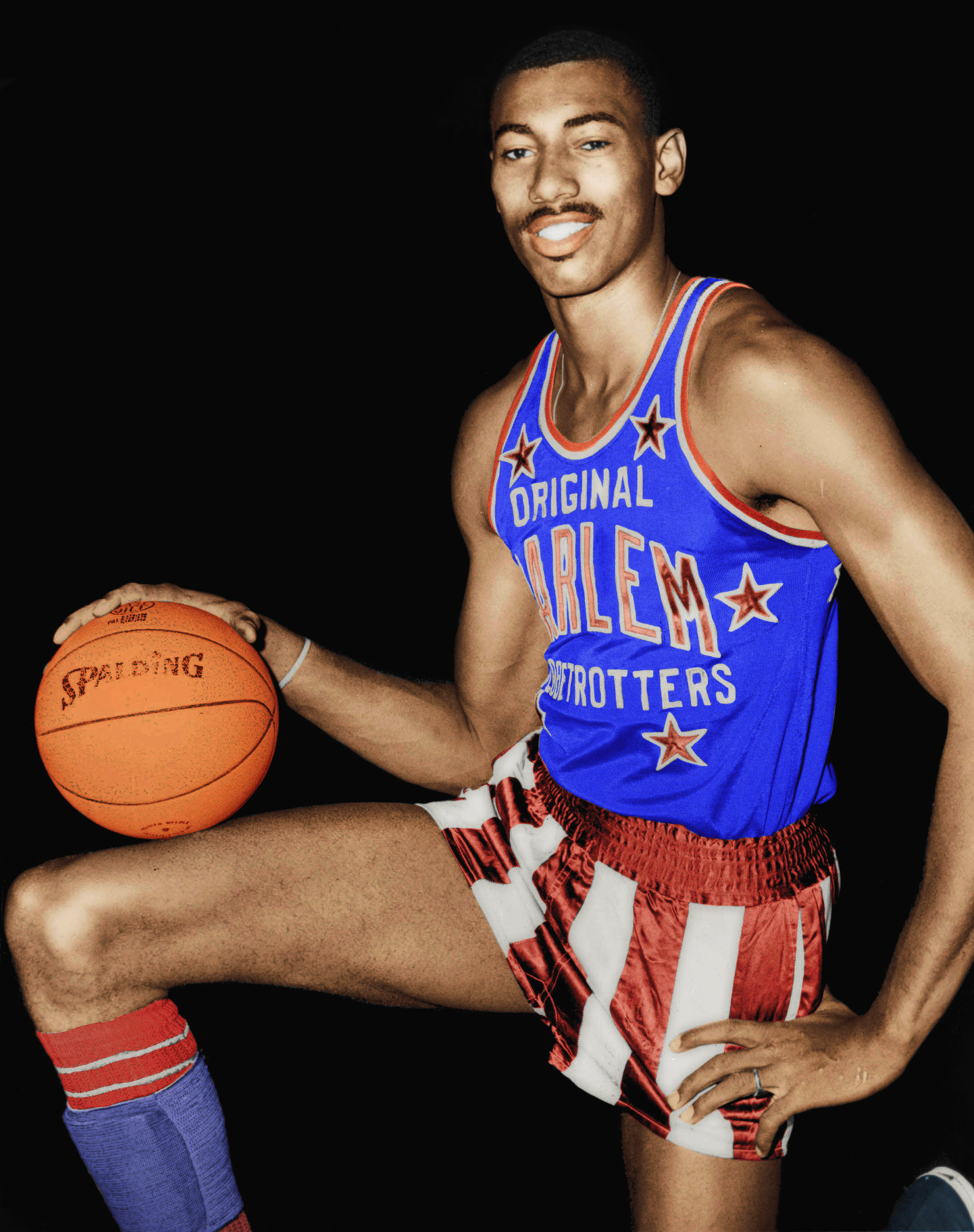
Wilt Chamberlain, the first Globetrotter to have his jersey number retired, played for the Globetrotters from 1958 to 1959

Harlem Globetrotters retired numbers
| No. | Player | Tenure | Date retired |
|---|---|---|---|
| 13 | Wilt "the Stilt" Chamberlain | 1958–1959 | March 9, 2000 |
| 20 | Marques Haynes | 1947–1953, 1972–1979 | January 5, 2001 |
| 22 | Fred "Curly" Neal | 1963–1985 | February 15, 2008 |
| 34 | Charles "Tex" Harrison | 1954–1972 | December 26, 2017 |
| 35 | Hubert "Geese" Ausbie | 1961–1985 | January 31, 2017 |
| 36 | Meadowlark Lemon | 1954–1979, 1993 | January 5, 2001 |
| 41 | "Sweet" Lou Dunbar | 1977–present | February 15, 2019 |
| 50 | Goose Tatum | 1941–1943, 1945–1955 | February 8, 2002 |

== Honorary members ==
Ten people have been officially named as honorary members of the team:

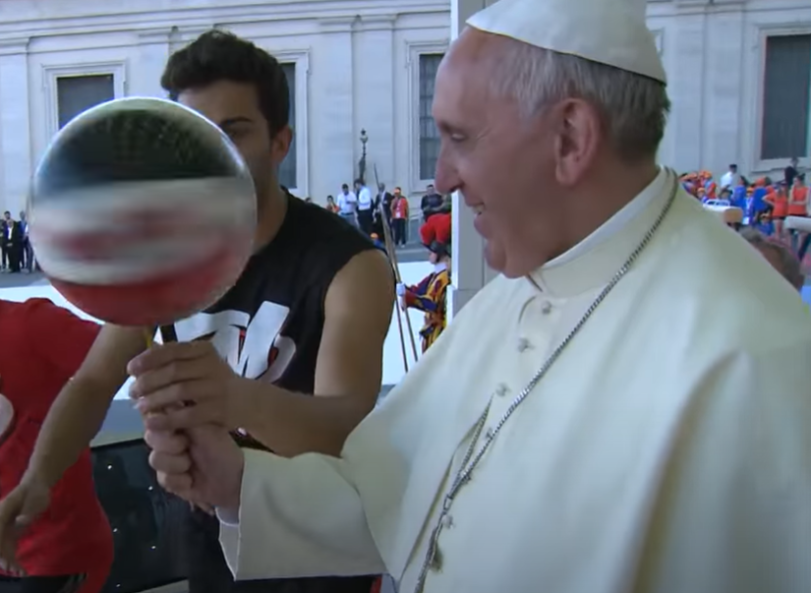
Pope Francis, an honorary member of the Harlem Globetrotters, spinning a basketball

- Henry Kissinger (1976)
- Bob Hope (1977)
- Kareem Abdul-Jabbar (1989)
- Whoopi Goldberg (1990)
- Nelson Mandela (1996)
- Jackie Joyner-Kersee (1999)
- Pope John Paul II (2000) – Press agent Lee Solters arranged a ceremony orchestrated in front of a crowd of 50,000 in Saint Peter's Square in which the Pope was recognized as an honorary Globetrotter.
- Jesse Jackson (2001)
- Pope Francis (2015)
- Robin Roberts (2015)

In addition, Bill Cosby (1972) and Magic Johnson (2003) were each signed to honorary $1-a-year lifetime contracts with the Globetrotters. When Cosby's nominal association with the team was the subject of criticism following sexual assault allegations, the Globetrotters stated that they have had no association with him for decades.

== Bibliography ==
- Kinokff, Dave; Williams, Edgar (1953). Around the World with the Harlem Globetrotters. Philadelphia: Macrae Smith Company.
- Kinokff, Dave; Bloggs, Fred (1958). Go, Man, Go!. New York: Pyramid Books. Retitled version of the above book, to coincide with the Go Man Go (film).
- Kinokff, Dave; Williams, Edgar (1971). Go, Man, Go!. New York: Willow Books. Updated version of two previous books.
- Vecsey, George (1970). Harlem Globetrotters. New York: Scholastic.
- Gault, Clare; Gault, Frank (1976). The Harlem Globetrotters and Basketball's Funniest Games. New York: Scholastic.
- Menville, Chuck (1978). The Harlem Globetrotters: An Illustrated History. New York: Willow Books.
- Green, Ben (2005). Spinning the Globe: The Rise, Fall, and Return to Greatness of the Harlem Globetrotters. New York: HarperCollins. ISBN 9780060555504.
- "Ready-To-Read", Educational Book series featuring the Harlem Globetrotters
  - Dobrow, Larry (2017). Here Come the Harlem Globetrotters. New York: Simon Spotlight.
  - Dobrow, Larry (2017). The Superstar Story of the Harlem Globetrotters. New York: Simon Spotlight.
  - Dobrow, Larry (2018). The Harlem Globetrotters Present the Points Behind Basketball. New York: Simon Spotlight.
