= Meadowlark Lemon =

American basketball player, actor, and minister (1932–2015)

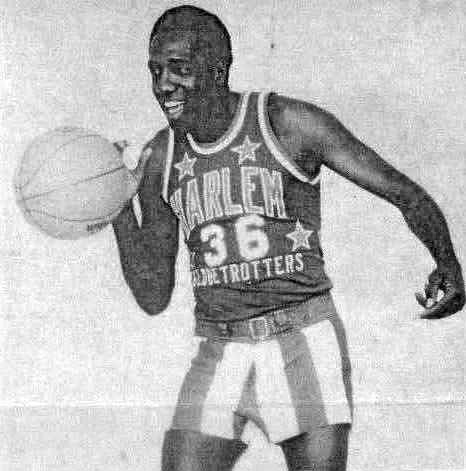
- Lemon with the Harlem Globetrotters in 1975
- Born: Meadow George Lemon III; April 25, 1932; Wilmington, North Carolina, U.S.
- Died: December 27, 2015 (aged 83); Scottsdale, Arizona, U.S.
- Occupations: Basketball player, actor, minister
- Known for: The Harlem Globetrotters
- Spouse: Cynthia Lemon (m. 1994–2015)
- Children: 10

Meadowlark Lemon (born Meadow George Lemon III; April 25, 1932 – December 27, 2015) was an American basketball player, actor, and Christian minister. For 22 years, he was known as the "Clown Prince" of the touring Harlem Globetrotters basketball team. He was a 2003 inductee into the Naismith Memorial Basketball Hall of Fame. Ordained in 1986, in 1994 he started Meadowlark Lemon Ministries in Scottsdale, Arizona.

In one of his final interviews, basketball legend Wilt Chamberlain described Lemon as "the most sensational, awesome, incredible basketball player I've ever seen." Fellow Wilmington great Michael Jordan called Lemon a "true national treasure" and a personal inspiration in Jordan's youth.

== Early life ==
Meadow George Lemon III was born in Wilmington, North Carolina and attended Williston Industrial School, graduating in 1952. He then matriculated at Florida A&M University, but was soon drafted into the United States Army and served for two years in Austria and West Germany. He had his name legally changed to Meadowlark Lemon in 1969.

== Career ==
=== Basketball ===
Lemon made his first basketball hoop out of a coat hanger, using an onion sack for a net and an empty Carnation milk can for a ball, with which he made his first shot.

Lemon first applied to the Globetrotters in 1954 at age 22, finally being chosen to play in 1955. In 1980, he left to form one of his Globetrotters imitators, the Bucketeers. He played with that team until 1983, then moved on to play with the Shooting Stars from 1984 to 1987. In 1988, he moved on to "Meadowlark Lemon's Harlem All Stars" team. Despite being with his own touring team, Lemon returned to the Globetrotters, playing 50 games with them in 1994.

In 2000, Lemon received the John Bunn Award, the highest honor given by the Naismith Memorial Basketball Hall of Fame outside induction. He was inducted into the Naismith Memorial Basketball Hall of Fame in 2003.

=== Television appearances ===
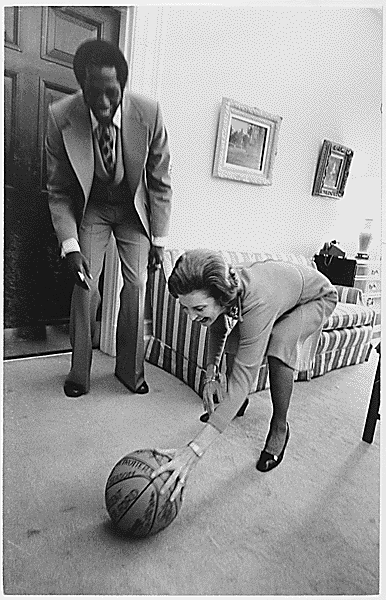
Lemon meeting Betty Ford during a 1974 visit to the White House

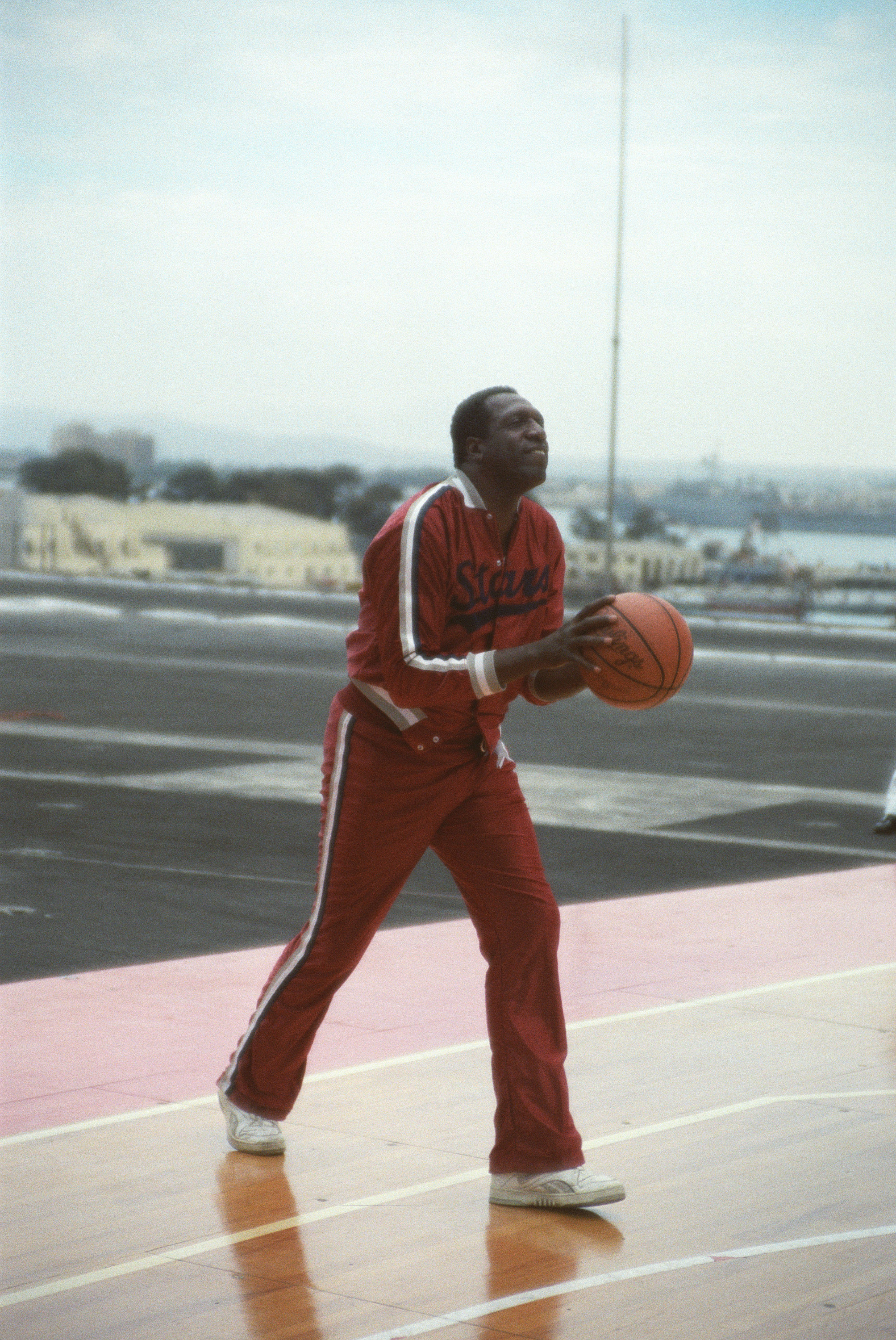
Lemon in 1988

In the 1970s, an animated version of Lemon, voiced by Scatman Crothers, starred with various other Globetrotters in the Hanna-Barbera animated cartoon series Harlem Globetrotters. The animated Globetrotters also made three appearances in The New Scooby-Doo Movies.

Lemon appeared alongside Fred "Curly" Neal, Marques Haynes and his other fellow Globetrotters in a live-action Saturday-morning television show, The Harlem Globetrotters Popcorn Machine, in 1974–1975, which also featured Rodney Allen Rippy and Avery Schreiber.

In 1978, Lemon appeared in a memorable Burger King commercial by making a tower of burgers until he found a double-beef pickles and onions with no-cheese burger.

In 1979, Lemon guest-starred in an episode of the NBC television anthology series $weepstake$.

In 1980, Lemon appeared as the coach of the basketball team from The White Shadow in a series of guest skits for Order/Disorder week on 3-2-1 Contact.

In 1983, Lemon appeared on an episode of Alice entitled "Tommy Fouls Out," and in a Charmin toilet paper commercial alongside Mr. Whipple (actor Dick Wilson).

In 1996 season 2 episode 5 of Pinky and the Brain titled "Brain's Song" Meadowlark Lemon was Brain's best friend in the parody of Brian's Song.

In 2006, on episode of adult swim's The Boondocks entitled "The Itis," the name of Meadowlark was used as the name of the park that Ed Wuncler I mentions an interest in purchasing from the state.

In 2009, on FOX's TV show The Cleveland Show, the name of Meadowlark Lemon was used for a dog's name, a pet for the character of Rallo Tubbs. The dog died in the second episode.

=== Other work ===
In 1979, Lemon starred in the educational geography film Meadowlark Lemon Presents the World and joined the cast in season two of the short-lived television sitcom, Hello, Larry, to help boost the show's ratings. In the same year, he played Rev. Grady Jackson in the movie The Fish That Saved Pittsburgh. It was several years before he actually became an ordained minister.

He recorded a song, "My Kids" which was written by Dalton & Dubarri. The song was produced by Dubarri, and released on Casablanca NB 969 in March, 1979. In The Cash Box Singles to Watch section, it was called Top 40 material by the reviewer.

In 1982, Lemon was featured in the Grammy-nominated video Fun & Games, an interactive educational video produced by Optical Programming Associates and Scholastic Productions, on the then-emerging LaserDisc format.

== Personal life ==
Lemon (right) in 2006 at the Victory Worship Center in Virginia

Lemon was married to Willye Maultsby from 1955 until their divorce in 1977. He later married Cynthia Lemon in 1994, remaining married until his death. His two marriages yielded ten children: Richard, George, Beverly, Donna, Robin, Jonathan, Jamison, Angela, Crystal, and Caleb.

A born-again Christian, Lemon became an ordained minister in 1986 and received a Doctor of Divinity degree from Vision International University in Ramona, California, in 1988. He was also featured as a gospel singer in several Gaither Homecoming videos. In his last years, he took up residence in Scottsdale, where his Meadowlark Lemon Ministries, Inc. is located.

== Death ==
Lemon died in Scottsdale, on December 27, 2015, at the age of 83. No cause of death was given.
