= Hubert Ausbie =

American basketball player (1938–2026)

Hubert Ausbie

Hubert Eugene "Geese" Ausbie (April 25, 1938 – November 8, 2026) was an American professional basketball player.

== Early life and education ==
Ausbie was born in Crescent, Oklahoma, on April 25, 1938. He attended Douglass High School where he played on the basketball and baseball teams. He was such an exceptional basketball star; during a tournament his senior season, he averaged 40 points per game and scored 70, 54 and 62 points in three consecutive games.

Following a brother of his, Ausbie attended Philander Smith College in Little Rock, Arkansas. He attended from 1956 to 1960 and was a star basketball player there, earning All-Conference and All-American honors. He was one of the leading college scorers in the NCAA's College Division (later called Division II), averaging 30 points per game.

== Career ==
Ausbie was offered contracts by Major League Baseball's Chicago Cubs and National Basketball Association teams. However, he joined the Harlem Globetrotters after his wife sent numerous letters describing his play to the team's founder Abe Saperstein, which led to Ausbie attending an open tryout in 1961 in Chicago. Ausbie gained fame as a Globetrotter from 1961 to 1985. After the retirement of Meadowlark Lemon, Ausbie took his place as the "Clown Prince of Basketball" for his dazzling play and irrepressible pranks on the court.

He retired from the team in 1985 and pursued other interests such as involvement in "Drug-Free Youth Program & Traveling Museum Showcase (a collection of Globetrotter-related memorabilia) which presented to hundreds of students at all grade levels in Arkansas and other states". He served on the advisory committee for the National Youth Sports Program.

In 1994, he received a Globetrotters Legends ring, a recognition given to only a few elite former players. The next year, he became head coach and manager of operations for the Globetrotters.

His jersey number 35 was retired by the Globetrotters on January 31, 2017, during the Globetrotters' game at Verizon Arena in North Little Rock, Arkansas.

== Personal life and death ==
Ausbie was married for 61 years to Awilda Ausbie until her death in 2020. He had four children.

A Mason, Ausbie resided in Little Rock, Arkansas, where he was a deacon at Greater Archview Baptist Church.

Ausbie died on November 8, 2026, at the age of 88.
