= Nate Branch =

American basketball player

Nate Branch is an American basketball player. After a high school career at Ravenswood High School in East Palo Alto, California, he played for University of Nebraska and later with the Harlem Globetrotters from 1967 to 1983.

Branch was drafted by the ABA's Oakland Oaks in 1967, and offered a contract by the NBA's San Diego Rockets in the same year. Following an injury at Oakland's camp, Branch returned home and eventually signed with the Globetrotters.

During his 15 years as a member of the legendary basketball team, Branch appeared with the Globetrotters on such television shows as White Shadow, Gilligan's Island, Wide World of Sports, The Harlem Globetrotters Popcorn Machine, Super Globetrotters (Nate was "Fluid Man"), and many more. He was a member of the Globetrotters in 1982 when they became the first professional sports organization to be awarded a Star on the Hollywood Walk of Fame.

Today, Branch is retired from the game, but continues to perform as a professional comedian and musician, and assists at basketball clinics for children. In 2022, his autobiography (co-written by Barry Kienzle), titled Playing My Way Through Life, was published.
