= Gilligan's Island season 3 =

Gilligan's Island
- Season 3
- No. of episodes: 30

Release
- Original network: CBS
- Original release: September 12, 1966 – April 17, 1967

Season chronology
- ← Previous; Season 2

The third and final season of the American comedy television series Gilligan's Island commenced airing in the United States on September 12, 1966, and concluded on April 17, 1967, on CBS. The third season continues the comic adventures of seven castaways as they attempted to survive and escape from an island on which they had been shipwrecked. Most episodes revolve around the dissimilar castaways' conflicts and their failed attempts—invariably Gilligan's fault—to escape their plight. The season originally aired on Mondays at 7:30-8:00 pm (EST).

Originally, it was planned for the series to be renewed at the conclusion of its third season, but at the last minute, CBS decided to renew their older show Gunsmoke (which soon vaulted to the top five in the rankings) and drop Gilligan's Island. This came as a shock to both the cast, crew, and series creator Sherwood Schwartz. At the time of its cancellation, the series was ranked 44th out of 101 shows in total. Immediately following the cessation of the show, it was sold into syndication, wherein it became a major success. However, Schwartz was forced to hire lawyers and audit United Artists film studio because they did not pay royalties in a timely fashion.

Critically, the season was initially brushed off, but contemporary reviews have seen the season in a much more positive light. Many critics have also commented on the season's use of guest stars and dream sequences. On July 26, 2005, the complete season was released on DVD by Warner Home Video subsidiary Turner Home Entertainment; the set included all 30 of the episodes, along with commentary on "The Producer" and several other bonus features.

== Cast ==
Bob Denver as Gilligan

Alan Hale Jr. as Jonas Grumby (Skipper)

Jim Backus as Thurston Howell III

Natalie Schafer as Eunice "Lovey" Howell

Tina Louise as Ginger Grant

Russell Johnson as Professor Roy Hinkley

Dawn Wells as Mary Ann Summers

== Production ==
Executive producers for the third season of Gilligan's Island included William Froug and series creator Sherwood Schwartz. Filming of the season took place at the CBS Radford Studios complex in Studio City, Los Angeles California. This complex contained 17 sound stages, as well as special effects and prop departments. On one stage, a lagoon had been constructed by the production company "at great expense". According to Bob Denver, the crew would spend half of their days filming scenes in the lagoon. Shots and sequences involving the characters' were filmed in a different soundstage. After the series' cancellation, the show's lagoon was not dismantled, and it remained in place until 1995, when it was converted into a parking lot.

== Cast ==
The series employed an ensemble cast of seven main actors and actresses. Denver played the role of the titular First Mate Gilligan, a bumbling, naive, and accident-prone crewman who often messes up the castaways chances of rescue. Alan Hale, Jr. portrayed The Skipper, captain of the S.S. Minnow and the older friend of Gilligan. Jim Backus appeared as Thurston Howell III, a millionaire, and Natalie Schafer played his wife, Eunice Lovelle Wentworth Howell. Tina Louise played the role Ginger Grant, a famous movie star. Russell Johnson portrayed Professor Roy Hinkley, Ph.D., a high school science teacher who often uses his scientific background to try to find ways to get the castaways off the island. Dawn Wells played Mary Ann Summers, wholesome farm girl from Kansas. Charles Maxwell was the uncredited voice of the radio announcer, who the castaways would often listen via their radio.

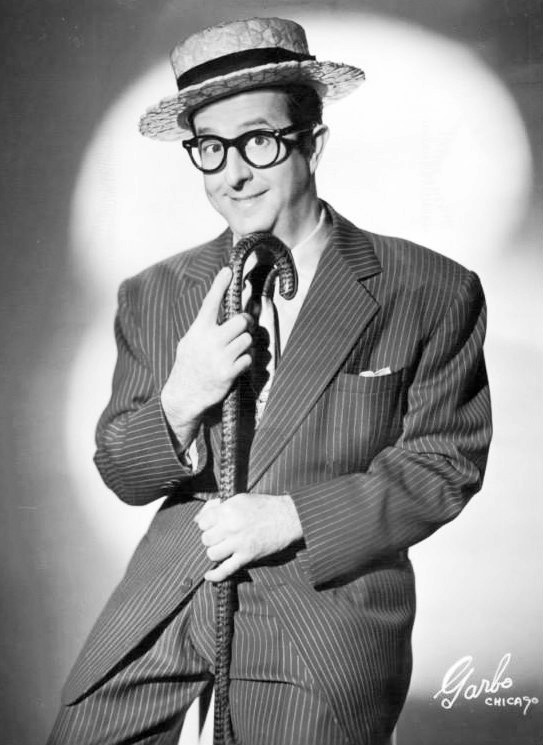
Comedy actor Phil Silvers appeared as Harold Hecuba in the episode "The Producer".

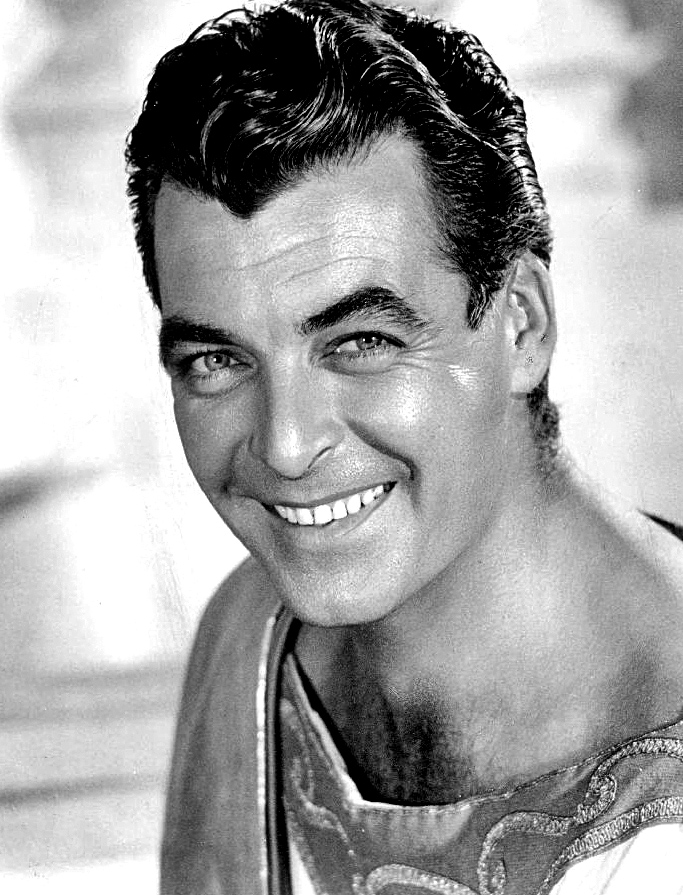
Rory Calhoun played the role of Jonathan Kincaid in the episode "The Hunter".

The season also featured several notable guest stars. Comedy actor Phil Silvers appears as the film director Harold Hecuba in the episode "The Producer". John McGiver plays the role of Lord Beasley in the episode "Man with a Net". Eddie Little Sky appears as a native in both "Voodoo" and "Topsy-Turvy". Vito Scotti reprises his role as Boris Balinkoff in the episode "Ring Around Gilligan"; he had previously appeared in the second season episode "The Friendly Physician". Allan Jaffe and Roman Gabriel—a Los Angeles Rams quarterback—appear as natives in "Topsy-Turvy". Don Rickles plays the role of the criminal in "The Kidnapper". In the episode "Take a Dare", Strother Martin portrays George Barkley, a contestant on the titular game show. In "The Hunter", Rory Calhoun plays the role of Jonathan Kincaid, and Harold Sakata portrays his assistant, Ramoo. Denny Miller plays the character Tongo, and Janos Prohaska plays the gorilla in the episode "Our Vines Have Tender Apes". Miller had previously appeared in the show as lost surfer Duke Williams in the first season episode "Big Man on Little Stick". In the episode "Splashdown", Chick Hearn, George Neise, Scott Graham, and Jim Spencer all play astronauts or officials of NASA. Jim Lefebvre, Al Ferrara, and Pete Sotos play headhunters in the episode "High Man on the Totem Pole". Midori and Michael Forest appears as Kalani and Ugundi, respectively, in "Slave Girl". In "The Pigeon", Sterling Holloway plays the role of Burt the prisoner. Finally, in "Gilligan the Goddess", Stanley Adams plays King Killiwani.

== Broadcast history ==
=== Ratings and syndication ===
The season originally aired Mondays at 7:30-8:00 pm (EST) on CBS. According to Arbitron, the season's first episode, "Up at Bat", received an 11.8 rating and a 23 share. Arbitron—later renamed Nielsen—ratings were audience measurement systems that determine the audience size and composition of television programming in the U.S. At the time, this meant that roughly 11.8 percent of all television-equipped households, and 23 percent of households watching television, were tuned in to the episode. Despite a drop in the ratings when compared to the previous two seasons, Gilligan's Island was still performing solidly in its third year and helped build "excellent" lead-ins for the series that aired directly afterwards on Monday nights. At the time of its cancellation, the series was ranked 44th out of 101 shows in total.

Following the season's end, and the series' cancellation, the show was sold into syndication by United Artists film studio, where it was particularly successful; at one point, it became the most syndicated television series to air. However, after four years in syndication, United Artists still had not announced to Schwartz that the series had turned a profit. Schwartz, familiar with the budgets that had been required to film the episodes, doubted this claim and audited the studio. To finance this endeavor, he used his earnings from his ABC series The Brady Bunch; this conflict later caused him to joke that every television writer or producer needs two hits in which "the second one [provides] the money for the lawsuit on the first one." Eventually, Schwartz and the studio reached an agreement without going to trial. While Schwartz made large sums of money due to syndication earnings, Wells revealed that the cast of the show never received any compensation.

=== Cancellation controversy ===
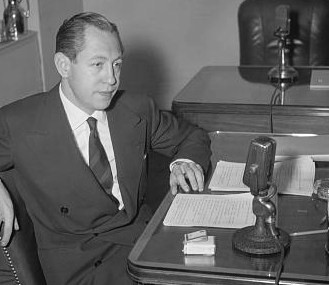
The series was cancelled largely because CBS chief executive William S. Paley did not want Gunsmoke to go off the air.

CBS executive Mike Dann had congratulated Schwartz on the renewal of Gilligan's Island while the show was in the midst of filming its third season. Schwartz then revealed the news to the cast and crew, to much celebration. Dawn Wells and Russ Johnson even purchased new homes, feeling satisfied with the future of the show supposedly secured. However, after several weeks, Schwartz never heard back from CBS Business Affairs, the department officially tasked with announcing the renewal of the show, even though the series appeared on the network's planned schedule for the following year. Schwartz soon learned that when William S. Paley, the chief executive who contributed largely to CBS's success, had learned that his and his wife's favorite television series, Gunsmoke was being canceled due to falling ratings, he demanded that the network find a way to re-add the drama into the 1967–68 United States network television schedule. Desperate, the program associates at CBS went into an "emergency session" and decided to cancel a new series called Doc, along with Gilligan's Island, and reschedule Gunsmoke in their place, at 7:30 (EST) on Mondays. Paley, who did not enjoy Gilligan's Island, found this plan acceptable. For Gunsmoke, this was a resounding success; the series rebounded, gaining an entirely new audience, vaulting to the top five in the Nielsen Ratings for the 1967–68 season (far exceeding previous ratings for Gilligan's Island) and staying in the top ten for six consecutive seasons, finally being cancelled after its twentieth season.

== Reception and release ==
=== Reception ===
Initially, the season—along with the series as a whole—was met with critical scorn, but was extremely popular with "the young crowd". Contemporary reviews have been largely positive, with many commenting upon the season's use of guest stars and dream sequences. Stuart Galbraith IV of DVD Talk noted that since "the series had exhausted every reasonably plausible story situation that could be derived from its limited premise, of seven castaways shipwrecked on an uncharted island in the Pacific […] the show's writers looked for any excuse to cut loose […] and by the third season this seemed like every other episode, dream sequences became the modus operandi." He concluded that, "at its best the show offers immensely likable characters in broadly funny situations that are, in the end, timeless."

=== DVD release ===
On July 26, 2005, the complete season was released on DVD by Warner Home Video subsidiary Turner Home Entertainment. The release included all 30 episodes on three discs, with an aspect ratio of 1.33:1. The set also included close-captioning, and subtitles in English, Spanish, and French. The audio is presented in Dolby Digital 2.0 mono. Extras include a season introduction by Schwartz, episode commentary for "The Producer", and the short documentary Gilligan's Island: A Pop Culture Phenomenon.

=== Airing order ===
The DVD put the episodes in the order they were broadcast. However, the copyrights on the end credits of some episodes indicate episodes made earlier were shown later. For instance, the final episode "Gilligan the Goddess" has a 1966 copyright, but is the series undeclared finale episode shown on April 17, 1967, well into the 1967 season. Eight 1967 copyrighted episodes precede it back to the episode "Gilligan's Personal Magnetism" which is the first aired episode to have a 1967 copyright. Jumbled in the mix of 1967 copyrighted episodes are two 1966 copyrighted episodes "Splashdown" and "The Secret of Gilligan's Island".

== Episodes ==
No. overall	No. in season	Title	Directed by	Written by	Original release date	Prod. code	U.S. households (in millions)
69	1	"Up at Bat"	Jerry Hopper	Ron Friedman	September 12, 1966	1625–0508	8.02
Skipper and Gilligan are hauling bags of coconuts. Gilligan drops his bag and a coconut rolls into a cave. He goes to get it and is bitten in the neck by a bat. Skipper says it's a vampire bat and Gilligan is convinced he will turn into a vampire. Professor tells them that's just superstition and they shouldn't frighten the girls with that kind of talk. When he can't see his reflection in Ginger's broken mirror, Gilligan believes he's become a vampire. That night, Gilligan sleepwalks into the Howell's hut and tries to bite Lovey on the neck. They wake him up and tell Gilligan what he did. Professor will make a potion and fool Gilligan into thinking it's a vampire cure. The drink knocks Gilligan out and they put him to bed. The next morning Gilligan is gone and there is a bat on his hammock. Professor captures the bat and tells everyone it's a fruit bat. Gilligan moves away to save his fellow castaways. Gilligan is haunted by a dream that he is indeed a vampire living in a Transylvanian castle in 1895. The Howells are unwary travelers who want to spend the night. They are let in by Mary Ann the toothless servant. Ginger is Gilligan's vampire bride. Inspector Sherlock (Professor) and Colonel Whatney (Skipper) arrive. Turns out that Mary Ann sent for them. Gilligan is chasing the Howell's around the room. Sherlock and Whatney over power Gilligan. Skipper wakes Gilligan up and tells him about the fruit bat.
70	2	"Gilligan vs. Gilligan"	Jerry Hopper	Joanna Lee	September 19, 1966	1625–0506	10.32
Mary Ann bakes a pie and Skipper and Professor are waiting for a piece. She says the pie is missing and then Gilligan shows up with the empty pie tin. They think he ate the pie, but he tries to prove he didn't. While looking for clues, Gilligan runs into a person who looks and dresses exactly like him. He tries to tell Skipper and Professor what he saw and they don't believe him. The person turns out to be a Russian agent who is on the island to try and find out what the castaway's mission is. The agent sees if he can pass as Gilligan by talking to Lovey and she doesn't suspect anything. Gilligan still maintains to the men that there is someone else that looks like him. He mentions that the double had a shiny gold pocket knife, which is actually the agent's two way radio. Professor thinks there might be someone and the men go looking. Gilligan finds a knapsack and calls for the others. The agent knocks him out and ties him up. The agent then tries to question the other castaways about why they are here. The castaways think there is something wrong with Gilligan, but the Professor says to play along. The real Gilligan escapes and tries to tell the others about the Russian agent. They all just pretend to go along with what he says. Gilligan chases the agent around and finally confronts him. The agent returns to his ship before Gilligan can prove he was there. Professor finds the gold pocket knife but it is broken. Note: Bob Denver plays both Gilligan and his double. Henry Corden is the uncredited voice of the Soviet Commandant.
71	3	"Pass the Vegetables, Please"	Leslie Goodwins	Elroy Schwartz	September 26, 1966	1625–0503	9.72
Gilligan reels in a crate of vegetable seeds from the lagoon, but fails to notice the warning on the crate that the seeds are radioactive. Everyone is excited about the huge variety and they set about to start planting them. Mary Ann, having grown up on a farm, has suggestions about the soil. It's only been 3 days and the plants are growing very quickly. The vegetables are also very strangely shaped. The castaways are feasting on the vegetables, but then hear a radio report about the missing radioactive seeds. Everyone is afraid that consuming the food could be fatal. Professor thinks that keeping active could prolong their lives. Soon they develop unusual abilities such as Mary Ann's exceptional eyesight from carrots. She sees a boat off in the distance and the guys want to build a signal fire. Gilligan develops great strength from spinach. Mary Ann says the boat is now gone. Mrs. Howell develops super speed from sugar beets. Professor comes up with a cure. The castaways have to eat some of their plant based soap.
72	4	"The Producer"	Ida Lupino & George M. Cahan	Gerald Gardner & Dee Caruso	October 3, 1966	1625–0512	9.94
Gilligan and Skipper see a plane flying over the island. Ginger hears on the radio that egocentric Hollywood producer Harold Hecuba is circling the world for new talent. Skipper says that the plane went down. Hecuba arrives on the island on his motorized raft and starts ordering Skipper and Gilligan around. After promising the castaways they will be rescued, Harold has them doing anything he says. Harold takes over the Howell's hut and makes them his butler and maid. Hecuba is unimpressed with Ginger's acting abilities and actually laughs at her. She decides she won't leave the island even if they're rescued. Gilligan suggests to Skipper and Professor that they put on a musical with Ginger as the star. That way Hecuba could see how great Ginger really is. The castaways start rehearsing their own musical production of Hamlet during the night. Hecuba wakes up and comes by. He says he's taking over production of the show. To show the others how it should be, Hecuba does his own version of the musical. The next morning Hecuba leaves the island without the castaways because he wants the idea of a musical Hamlet for his own. Phil Silvers of Gladasya Productions (which filmed Gilligan's Island) guests stars as Harold Hecuba. Note: In 1997, TV Guide ranked this episode #52 on its list of the 100 Greatest Episodes.
73	5	"Voodoo"	George Cahan	Herbert Finn & Alan Dinehart	October 10, 1966	1625–0501	10.27
Skipper finds Gilligan in a cave looking for his rabbit foot. While looking, Gilligan digs up some artifacts. A witch-doctor (Eddie Little Sky) is watching them and he has the rabbit foot. Professor is very impressed with what Gilligan found but Skipper thinks they're cursed. Professor scoffs at the Skipper's superstitions. The witch-doctor steals a personal item from each castaway. Howell would like a priceless artifact from the cave and offers some money to Skipper and Gilligan. Despite the fear of voodoo, Skipper makes Gilligan go back in the cave. The witch-doctor has made dolls that resemble each castaway and starts casting voodoo spells with them. Professor still believes there's a logical explanation for what's happening and then he is suddenly turned into a zombie. Ginger tries kissing Professor to bring him back but it doesn't work. Skipper thinks the curses will be lifted if they put the artifacts back in the cave. Gilligan puts what he thinks are all the artifacts back in the cave but the witch-doctor is still casting spells. Howell puts cash in the cave hoping that will work. It's the next day and Professor is still a zombie. That night Ginger tries a native dance to arouse Professor. But she mistakenly does a rain dance and it starts to storm. When Gilligan puts the last of the artifacts back in the cave, he finds the voodoo dolls and the castaways personal belongings. Skipper waves Professor's knife in front of him and the spell is broken. Gilligan makes a voodoo doll of a witch-doctor and sticks a pin in it. The witch-doctor screams and runs into the lagoon..
74	6	"Where There's a Will"	Charles Norton	Sid Mandel & Roy Kammerman	October 17, 1966	1625–0505	10.71
Mr. Howell isn't feeling well. Professor says he just has a stomach ache. Because everyone cared about his well being, Howell decides to put the castaways in his will. Everyone thinks about what they'll buy with their new found riches. Howell is talking to Gilligan when an arrow hits the tree next to him. Howell begins to think someone wants to kill him. Ginger and Mary Ann have covered up a pit with palm branches and Howell falls in. A boulder falls and almost hits Howell. Lovey says there must be an explanation for these events. What Howell doesn't know is, because they are so grateful, the others are planning a surprise party for him. The pit was to catch and kill a wild boar on the island for spareribs. An overheard discussion convinces Howell they want to murder him for the money. Howell leaves for the other side of the island. Lovey finds out about the party and tells them Howell went into hiding. Howell hears the men searching for him and he leads them to believe he fell into some quick sand. During a funeral service for Howell, the others all say how much he meant to them. They can't accept the things he gave them in his will. Overhearing the service, Howell realizes that the castaways really care for him. When they find Howell is still alive, they throw the party for him.
75	7	"Man with a Net"	Leslie Goodwins	Budd Grossman	October 24, 1966	1625–0513	8.84
Lord Beasley Waterford (John McGiver), a world famous butterfly collector, comes to the island. He's there in search of the world's rarest butterfly, the Pussycat Swallowtail. He tells Gilligan and Skipper that he arrived by boat, with a flare pistol to signal when he's ready to leave. Beasley agrees to take the castaways with him. Professor says that despite Beasley's talent, it could take a very long time to find that butterfly. Professor suggests that they all help him. While hunting, Beasley walks into quicksand and later falls off a cliff. Gilligan and Skipper even accompany Beasley and climb a mountain looking for the butterfly. Howell tries to bribe Beasley and Ginger tries to seduce him. Professor studies up on butterflies hoping to get close to Beasley and convince him to set off the flare. Gilligan finds the flare gun but it has no flares in it. Beasley confronts the castaways about them trying to get him to leave the island without the butterfly. He tells them he will not leave without it. Skipper tries painting another butterfly to look like a Pussycat Swallowtail. Beasley is fooled until rain washes the paint off. They try to get Beasley drunk so they can get his flare gun. The only problem is that he can out drink them and the castaways all pass out. Beasley then finds his butterfly and sets off his flare. He is forced to leave without the castaways, as they are out cold. Days later, they hear an interview with Beasley on the radio and he doesn't even mention them.
76	8	"Hair Today, Gone Tomorrow"	Tony Leader	Brad Radnitz	October 31, 1966	1625–0507	8.18
Gilligan is exhausted from doing everyone's laundry. Gilligan's hair turns completely white overnight. Professor's not sure what could've caused the change. He tells Gilligan to go about his normal life and no one will be affected by his hair. Mary Ann and Ginger see Gilligan's hair and both faint. Gilligan overhears a conversation between Professor and Skipper about a disease that can transform a young man overnight into an old man. Gilligan begins to talk and act like an elderly man. Skipper tries to tell him he doesn't have that disease. Gilligan asks everyone to come see him. Professor tells the others that they should humor Gilligan. Gilligan gives the others his possessions. Mary Ann tries to make Gilligan feel young again by flirting with him. Lovey suggests to Professor and Skipper that they dye his hair while he's sleeping. They dye his hair brown, but when he wakes up in the morning, Gilligan is completely bald. Mary Ann and Ginger see Gilligan's bald head and both faint. Gilligan leaves a note saying he's hiding in a cave. Ginger and Mary Ann each try giving Gilligan a wig, but he doesn't like what he sees. Skipper takes over laundry duty. Soon, the Skipper loses his hair as well. Professor finally figures out it had to do with the bleach Gilligan was using for the laundry.
77	9	"Ring Around Gilligan"	George Cahan	John Fenton Murray	November 7, 1966	1625–0509	9.06
Mad scientist Dr. Boris Balinkoff returns to the island. Gilligan and Skipper are building a raft to get off the island. Gilligan finds a ring that Balinkoff has intentionally left and puts it on. That night, Balinkoff, using a mechanical control device and the ring, turns Gilligan into a mindless robot slave. The next day, Lovey likes Gilligan's ring and asks to wear it. That night, thinking he is still controlling Gilligan, he asks him to go to the Howell hut and take a lot of money. Gilligan is then to bring it to Balinkoff. Howell wakes up, sees Lovey with the money and then she knocks him out. Boris is surprised to see Lovey with the money. Back at the hut and no longer being controlled, Lovey tells Thurston he just had a bad dream. Lovey gives the ring to Skipper to return to Gilligan. Skipper is wearing the ring and Boris orders him to destroy the raft. Later, Skipper thinks Gilligan wrecked the raft. Gilligan rebuilds the raft. Ginger, who now has the ring, comes by and destroys it. Gilligan now has the ring. While Boris is sleeping, Igor, his monkey, plays with the control and makes Gilligan act like a monkey. Professor and Howell witness Gilligan. That night, Boris has Gilligan place rings on the others. Boris tells everyone that they will help him rob Fort Knox. Balinkoff has the castaways rehearse the robbery using coconuts instead of gold bars. The Doctor is foiled by an assault of coconuts, crushing his mechanical control device. The castaways come to as Boris speeds off in his boat. Note: This is the second and final appearance of the character Dr. Boris Balinkoff and the fourth and final guest appearance of Vito Scotti
78	10	"Topsy-Turvy"	Gary Nelson	Elroy Schwartz	November 14, 1966	1625–0511	9.83
The castaways are preparing to hide from a possible invasion of headhunters. Skipper, Gilligan and Professor find a perfect cave for all to hide in. Gilligan bumps his head and sees everything upside down. Professor thinks he can concoct a cure for Gilligan made with Captibora berries. But there are many varieties of the berry and it must be a certain one. Because the headhunter drums have stopped, the Professor believes it's safe to go hunt for the berries. But three of the headhunters are around. They make a few attempts to capture someone, but fail. Professor concocts a potion and gives it to Gilligan. He now sees right side up again, but he sees double of everything. Professor says Gilligan might also see things that aren't really there, so he shouldn't believe everything he sees. Gilligan sees two headhunters but doesn't think they're real. The headhunters capture the Howell's, Ginger and Mary Ann. Professor gives Gilligan another potion of the berries and now he sees five of everything. Professor has Gilligan drink some water to dilute the potion and his vision is back to normal. Skipper and Professor are captured. Gilligan lures the headhunters into drinking the potion and the sight of 35 castaways forces them to flee in terror. Eddie Little Sky and Los Angeles Rams quarterback Roman Gabriel play two of the headhunters.
79	11	"The Invasion"	Leslie Goodwins	Sam Locke & Joel Rapp	November 21, 1966	1625–0518	8.78
While fishing, Skipper reels in a locked official Government briefcase. Professor believes that the Government will spare no expense in finding it and they will be rescued. The others want to open it to see what is inside. Professor says that they shouldn't open it, because when the Government comes to find it, they will want it intact. But, during the night everyone tries to get the case from Professor's hut and open it. The next morning Professor says the case is missing and everyone is a suspect. They all confess to having it at one point and Gilligan puts it on the table. While making a point, Professor slams his hand on the case and it opens. Professor sees a top secret file titled "US Defense plans against secret attack". He is now worried that some enemy spies may try and find the case. Gilligan accidentally handcuffs himself to the briefcase. He becomes afraid that the enemy will come to the island and kill him. Attempts to free Gilligan fail. Gilligan dreams that he is Good Guy Spy 014 (a spoof of James Bond 007). The Chief of the Good Guy Spy Outfit (Professor) wants 014 to get a briefcase to the Secretary of Defense. Evil Agent 10 (Mary Ann) calls Mister EVIL (Howell) saying she will try and get the case. 014 kills Agent 10. Mister EVIL calls Evil Agent 5 (Ginger) and she plans to poison 014. Agent 5 winds up poisoning herself. 014 goes to see his Mother (Skipper) who turns out to be Evil Agent 1 in disguise. Mister EVIL poses as the Secretary and gets the case. He then shoots 014 who turns out to be a machine. The real 014 comes in and has a scuffle with Mister EVIL. Skipper and Professor wake Gilligan up. When the case does get opened again, it reveals that it's from World War 1 and of no use to anyone. They throw the case in the lagoon and it blows up.
80	12	"The Kidnapper"	Jerry Hopper	Ray Singer	November 28, 1966	1625–0515	9.99
Skipper and Gilligan find a note that says Lovey has been kidnapped and they are to pay a ransom. Gilligan and Professor are to deliver the ransom. While putting the money in a hollow log, Gilligan gets stuck. Lovey is released and then there's a note saying Mary Ann has been kidnapped. The Howell's are to deliver the ransom. Mary Ann is released and Ginger is taken. Gilligan and Mary Ann are to deliver the ransom. Ginger is released and she says that the kidnapper will keep taking people. Professor comes up with a plan to catch the kidnapper using Gilligan as bait. Gilligan sets off the trap and gets himself caught. But meanwhile, Skipper captures the kidnapper and puts him in a jail. Norbett Wiley (Don Rickles) explains that he can't help himself. He left civilization so he wouldn't be tempted again. Norbett says he came by boat, but the propeller is now bent. Professor remains wary of his many stories, though the others succumb to his outward charm. Ginger tries to be a psychiatrist and find out why Norbett turned to crime. The castaways decide to try and reform him instead of holding him prisoner. They let Wiley go and plan to give him a welcome back to society party. During the party, Wiley steals things from many of the others. He then excuses himself from the party, and before anyone knows what happened, Wiley leaves in his boat.
81	13	"And Then There Were None"	Jerry Hopper	Ron Friedman	December 5, 1966	1625–0517	8.78
Gilligan and Mary Ann are hanging the wash and suddenly Mary Ann disappears. Professor believes there must be headhunters on the island. Everyone goes searching for her and then Ginger vanishes. Professor suggests that the headhunters may be in search of brides. He gets Gilligan to dress as Mrs. Howell and will use him as bait. Lovey is the next to disappear. When they find no evidence of headhunters, Professor theorizes that one of the men must be responsible. An unknowing fiend who has done away with the girls, a genuine Jekyll and Hyde. Gilligan starts to worry that he's the one behind it all. That night, Professor and Howell are looking in the area where the wash was hung. The two fall through a trap door that is covered with grass. Skipper also falls through the trap door and finds the others. It turns out they're in an old World War Two Japanese munitions pit. Gilligan starts hearing voices out of thin air, so he assumes that he's killed all his friends and is now being haunted by them. Gilligan dreams that he is Dr. Gilligan and is on trial for being Mr. Hyde. The Bailiff (Skipper) announces the start of the trial. A cockney flower girl (Mary Ann) tells Dr. Gilligan that she believes he's innocent. She finds him a defense barrister, Mary Poppins (Lovey). The Judge (Howell) and the Prosecuting barrister (Professor) bring out an eyewitness, the Lady in Red (Ginger). The more the Lady in Red talks, the more Dr. Gilligan transforms into Mr. Hyde. Gilligan wakes up and hears the voices again. He falls through the trap door holding the clothes line. Everyone is now able to escape.
82	14	"All About Eva"	Jerry Hopper	Joanna Lee	December 12, 1966	1625–0516	9.11
A plain and lovelorn woman named Eva Grubb comes to the island. Gilligan and Ginger see the boat in the lagoon and tell the others. By the footprints they figure out that it's a woman and go to search for her. Skipper and Gilligan find Eva and she says they can have the boat. She says she never wants to see anyone again especially a man. Eva gives them the key to the boat if they promise to leave her alone on the island. Professor advises that in her present state of mind it might not be wise for her to be alone. They should send a boat back for her once they reach the mainland, but they can't tell her about it. Gilligan accidentally spills the beans to Eva about their plan to send a boat back. Eva hides the spark plugs so that no one can leave the island. Howell tries to bribe Eva, but it doesn't work. To make Eva feel better about herself, the girls decide to give her a makeover. When the girls are done, Eva looks exactly like Ginger. Eva looks in the mirror and she can't believe how beautiful she is. Eva gives the castaways the missing spark plugs. Lovey tells Eva that there will be a going away party. Lovey also says that if Eva went to Hollywood, no one would know she wasn't Ginger. That night Eva ties up Ginger and says she will go to the party and fool them all into thinking she's Ginger. Eva does have to do some fast maneuvering to be both Eva and Ginger. Ginger shows up and reveals Eva's plan to sail off as her. Eva asks everyone to forgive her. The next morning, Eva and the boat are missing. A note says she's going to pose as Ginger and no one will ever suspect the truth. Note: Tina Louise plays the dual roles of Ginger and Grubb.
83	15	"Gilligan Goes Gung-Ho"	Robert Scheerer	Bruce Howard	December 26, 1966	1625–0510	9.06
Professor, Mary Ann and Ginger are rehearsing a play with a passionate three way love affair. Ginger fires a gun and "kills" Professor. Gilligan witnesses this and thinks it's real. Gilligan is about to tell Skipper what he saw, when Skipper says he found a phosphorescent rock. Gilligan then tells Skipper about the murder. Meanwhile, when Professor fell after pretending to be shot he got a bloody nose. Skipper and Gilligan go to the hut and find out it was just a play. Professor decides to establish law and order on the island. Skipper will be Sheriff and Gilligan the Deputy. Professor wants to collect more phosphorescent rocks to use as a signal to a plane overhead. Deputy Gilligan arrests Howell and puts him in a cave jail. He then jails Ginger, Mary Ann and Mrs. Howell. Professor and Skipper are next. They stage a fight in the jail hoping Gilligan will open the door, but it doesn't work. A search plane is approaching the island. Gilligan winds up locking himself in the jail with the others. Just then the plane passes over the island and flies away. The castaways do get out of the jail and then lock Gilligan up again. Glenn Langan as Search Plane Pilot. Note: A similar story takes place on The Andy Griffith Show when acting Sheriff of the Day Barney Fife locks up the entire town of Mayberry!
84	16	"Take a Dare"	Stanley Z. Cherry	Roland MacLane	January 2, 1967	1625–0504	12.08
Gilligan and Skipper are fishing in the lagoon. They hear on the radio that the Take-A-Dare radio show has put a contestant named George Barkley (Strother Martin) on a deserted island. He must survive for one week without any help from anyone. If he can do this he will win $10,000. Gilligan and Skipper go off to get some bananas and leave the fish on the beach. George comes by and takes the fish. Gilligan and Skipper ask the others if they took the fish. A rash of disappearances have the castaways mystified, but soon they discover George with all the stolen items. George takes a part out of his transmitter so the others can't use it. If they did use it, he would have to forfeit the prize. Professor tries to get the transmitter to work, but he can't. No amount of begging gets George to help the castaways. Howell even offers to give George the money, but George thinks Howell's money is counterfeit. Ginger tries flirting with George. He is quite attracted to Ginger, but still won't give up the transmitter part. Professor discovers the transmitter is now gone. There are two days left and the castaways try to find George. George is talking to the radio program and Gilligan and Skipper start yelling. The announcer asks about the other voices and George says the transmitter is picking up another signal. Skipper talks to the radio program not knowing George disconnected the mike. Later, they see George throw the transmitter off a cliff. The castaways will each go to an assigned place on the island and watch for the boat. George leaves the island by helicopter. The radio interviews George and tells him the money is in a secret compartment in the transmitter.
85	17	"Court-Martial"	Gary Nelson	Roland MacLane	January 9, 1967	1625–0523	11.53
Skipper and Gilligan hear on the radio that the Maritime Board has pinned the loss of the Minnow on the Skipper. Distraught, Skipper wanders off. Gilligan tells the others and they go looking for Skipper. Skipper contemplates killing himself but is stopped by the others. After a suggestion from Ginger, Professor recreates the Minnow voyage to disprove the Maritime Board charge. The blame seems to shift to Gilligan. Skipper says they were both to blame and he and Gilligan decide to move to the other side of the island. Despite the others wanting them to stay, Skipper and Gilligan say goodbye and leave. Gilligan dreams that he is back in the Golden Age of Pirates. Lord Admiral Gilligan is sailing his large ship. Queen Mother (Lovey) and her daughters (Ginger and Mary Ann) are his passengers. Three pirates, Captain Hook (Howell), Long John Silver (Skipper) and Captain Kidd (Professor), board his ship. The Pirates lock the women below and put Gilligan in a cage. Gilligan manages to get out off the cage and he frees the women. The Pirates find the treasure chest full of gold coins. Gilligan gets into a sword fight with the Pirates. The Pirates make Gilligan walk the plank. Skipper wakes Gilligan up. Professor comes by with the radio. A report says that because of new information, the crew of the Minnow were not to blame. Note: This plot element would refigure 11 years later in Rescue from Gilligan's Island when, now back on land, the Skipper is unable to receive an insurance check for his new boat, The Minnow II unless he can prove that the shipwreck was not his fault.
86	18	"The Hunter"	Leslie Goodwins	Ben Gershman & William Freedman	January 16, 1967	1625–0519	11.42
Gilligan sees a helicopter land on the island. On board is big game hunter Jonathan Kincaid (Rory Calhoun) and his assistant Ramoo (Harold Sakata). When he learns there's no game to hunt, he decides to hunt "the Most Deadly Game": a human. He tells the castaways that he radioed for a boat to pick them up the next day. Jonathan will speak to each castaway to see who will present the best challenge. He decides to go after Gilligan and makes the announcement that night. Jonathan promises to rescue everyone if Gilligan can survive 24 hours. Howell tries to bribe Kincaid, but it doesn't work. Ginger tries to seduce Jonathan and she puts a sedative in his drink. But Gilligan drinks it. The next day the hunt begins. The castaways are locked up and Ramoo guards them. There are a couple close calls, but Gilligan survives through the night. The castaways are able to get out of the cave and subdue Ramoo. Jonathan fires at Gilligan but misses again. Professor and Skipper hide Gilligan is a hollowed out tree. Gilligan lasts the 24 hours. Kincaid leaves without the castaways, saying that no one can know he hunted a human. The radio announces that after winning a shooting match, Kincaid had to be put in a straight jacket because he kept muttering the name Gilligan. Note: Based on The Most Dangerous Game Note This storyline was later used on the Logan's Run (TV series) episode Capture in 1977.
87	19	"Lovey's Secret Admirer"	David Orrick McDearmon	Herbert Finn & Alan Dinehart	January 23, 1967	1625–0525	10.71
Mrs. Howell has a secret admirer who is sending letters to her. Mr. Howell is outraged and jealous. He accuses Skipper, then Professor and then Gilligan, but they each deny it. Lovey is enjoying the idea of having an admirer. Ginger and Mary Ann try to find out if Skipper is the one by both pretending to like him. Professor invents a lie detector. When the three men pass the test, Professor suggests to the Howell's there's someone else on the island. But he tells Gilligan he thinks he knows who the real person is. A trap reveals the truth. Thurston had been writing the notes because he felt that with Lovey being older, she might appreciate the attention. This, of course, infuriates her and she kicks Mr. Howell out. All of this causes her to dream that she is Cinderella. Stepmother (Skipper) gives Cinderella a lot of chores to do. A Royal Messenger (Billy Curtis) brings two invitations to the ball that evening. Cinderella's two stepsisters (Ginger and Mary Ann) will be going. Cinderella's Fairy Godfather (Gilligan) shows up. He gives her an invitation and makes her beautiful. At the castle, the Prince (Howell) meets and dances with the stepsisters. He then sees Cinderella and dances with her. Because it's midnight, Cinderella has to leave. Lovey wakes up and her and Thurston get back together.
88	20	"Our Vines Have Tender Apes"	David Orrick McDearmon	Sid Mandel & Roy Kammerman	January 30, 1967	1625–0524	11.53
Gilligan finds Tongo the Ape Man (Denny Miller), actually a movie actor researching a role, in his hut. When Gilligan tries to tell Skipper and Professor about it, they all see Tongo. He tries to fool the castaways into believing he is really a "savage" jungle lord (a la Tarzan). All of the castaways are menaced by Tongo. The men go looking for him, but Tongo throws coconuts at them. Tongo gets into the girls hut and makes off with Ginger after she faints. He puts her in a cave and she tries to communicate with him. Ginger finds out his name is Tongo. She escapes after she hits him on the head with a coconut and knocks him out. After Ginger refuses, Mary Ann agrees to be bait to trap Tongo in a cage. Once he's left alone, Tongo takes out a tape recorder, and starts to keep track of his exploits. He records that he recognizes Ginger Grant. Gilligan talks to Tongo and Professor believes they can let him out of the cage. The castaways are amazed at how easily he adjusts to their teachings. But the island's resident gorilla (Janos Prohaska) gives him away and reveals Tongo to be a coward. The gorilla takes Tongo away. He drops his tape recorder and the castaways find out all about him. The castaways want to rescue Tongo from the gorilla so he can get them off the island. They dress up Gilligan as a gorilla to attract the real ape. Tongo escapes by helicopter, unwilling to rescue the castaways for fear that they might tell about his cowardice with the real ape.
89	21	"Gilligan's Personal Magnetism"	Hal Cooper	Bruce Howard	February 6, 1967	1625–0526	11.20
Skipper and Gilligan are bowling when a storm pops up. Gilligan and his stone bowling ball are magnetically attached to each other after he is struck by lightning. Also, touching Gilligan means an electric shock. Professor says that the stone has a high iron ore content and the electricity caused it to be magnetized to the iron in Gilligan's body. The Howell's try to make Gilligan relax enough to where the ball will come off, but it doesn't work. Professor invents a device that will hopefully break apart the stone ball. They try it once and it doesn't work yet. Just then another bolt of lightning dislodges the ball but renders Gilligan invisible. Professor at first doesn't know what to do to help Gilligan. Professor designs a lead sheathed bandage that should absorb the charge that continues to surge through Gilligan's body. Gilligan now looks like a mummy. A frightened Ginger unravels the bandage and Gilligan is still invisible. Skipper finds a note from Gilligan that says he's moving to the other side of the island. Everyone says how much they love Gilligan and will miss him. Turns out he's sitting right at the table listening. Skipper gets upset that Gilligan tricked them and wants to hit him with his hat. Gilligan figures Skipper can't see him so he's not worried. But, the bandages apparently were on long enough, because Gilligan reappears.
90	22	"Splashdown"	Jerry Hopper	John Fenton Murray	February 20, 1967	1625–0522	10.27
The radio Commentator (Chick Hearn) tells that the spacecraft Scorpio 6, with astronauts Tobias and Ryan, has taken off. They will rendezvous with an unmanned capsule. Professor determines that Scorpio 6 will pass directly over their island three times. Professor believes he can build a radio signal to let the astronauts know they are there. When that doesn't work, Professor comes up with the idea to build a flaming SOS signal. They will use some of Howell's Brandy as fuel for the fire. But, Gilligan messes that up by tripping over the logs. The signal now spells SOL, which is astronaut Tobias' first name. However, they may get another chance when the unmanned capsule lands by the lagoon. Unfortunately, the radio inside has been damaged. The castaways radio says that NASA knows the general area where the capsule went down. Navy ships and planes will be sent to look for it. Professor plans to float the capsule out to sea with Gilligan and the Skipper in it. Everyone else comes up with a reason why they should be in the capsule. Before daybreak the Howell's sneak into the capsule. Not knowing the Howells are in there, Ginger and Mary Ann get in. Meanwhile, a NASA Official (George N. Neise) learns that they can't find the capsule. The capsule contains top secret instruments that can't fall into enemy hands. Gilligan and Skipper discover the others in the capsule and get them out. But, before anything else can happen, NASA remotely blows up the capsule.
91	23	"High Man on the Totem Pole"	Herbert Coleman	Brad Radnitz	February 27, 1967	1625–0520	9.44
Skipper and Gilligan find a totem pole in the jungle, and the head at the top of the pole is a dead ringer for Gilligan. Professor says that the pole was carved by the headhunting Kupakai tribe. The head on top was probably a king of the tribe and it's just a coincidence that it looks like Gilligan. Gilligan now obsesses that he might be a descendent of the king. The others try to get Gilligan to think about something else, but it doesn't work. Gilligan finally decapitates the totem pole, unable to face it. Convinced he has headhunter blood in him, Gilligan wants to move to the other side of the island before he hurts someone. To prove he's not a headhunter, Professor will offer himself up to Gilligan as a sacrifice. Gilligan can't chop off Professor's head and realizes he's not a headhunter. Meanwhile, three headhunters find their pole destroyed and vow to kill whoever cut the head off. Skipper and Professor see the Kupakai and go to warn the others. The Kupakai capture the Howell's and Thurston tries to bribe them. Professor comes up with the idea to dress Gilligan up as the Kupakai king and get the three to release the Howell's. Professor tries to teach Gilligan the Kupakai words. Skipper goes to check on the Howell's and is captured. Ginger, Mary Ann and Professor are then also captured. Gilligan, with the help of the totem pole head, frightens the Kupakai away. Jim Lefebvre as Native. Al Ferrara as Native.
92	24	"The Second Ginger Grant"	Steve Binder	Ron Friedman	March 6, 1967	1625–0527	9.99
Ginger is singing for the castaways and Mary Ann is quite taken with her performance. Mary Ann trips over a rock, hits her head, and now she thinks she is Ginger. Professor diagnoses her as having a bad case of Ginger envy. He suggests humoring her to prevent any kind of psychological trauma. Professor also thinks that Ginger should dress up as Mary Ann. Gilligan is very uncomfortable rehearsing a love scene with Mary Ann. Ginger panics when Mary Ann cuts all of Ginger's clothes to fit her. Mary Ann faints when she sees Ginger without the dark hair wig on. When she comes to, Mary Ann is in shock. Professor attempts to hypnotize Mary Ann. His hypnotic suggestion bounces off her and hits an eavesdropping Gilligan. Mary Ann still thinks she's Ginger, but now Gilligan thinks he's Mary Ann. Professor is able to bring Gilligan back to normal. Professor comes up with the idea to have Mary Ann sing and dance as Ginger. When Mary Ann can't actually perform, her memory comes back.
93	25	"The Secret of Gilligan's Island"	Gary Nelson	Story by : Bruce Howard & Arne Sultan; Teleplay by : Bruce Howard	March 13, 1967	1625–0514	9.72
Skipper and Professor are looking for Gilligan and find him in a cave. Gilligan found an ancient Hieroglyphic stone tablet in the cave. Professor believes if they can find the rest of the tablets, it may tell them the way to get off the island. The others search the caves and find more pieces of the tablet. Gilligan found the last piece they need, but he drops it and it breaks into many pieces. Professor is able to repair it. That night Gilligan falls out of a tree and bumps his head. Gilligan dreams the castaways are prehistoric cave people. Gilligan is chiseling a picture on a stone. Chief Howell doesn't like it and breaks it apart. Skipper and Gilligan want to take a trip to the other side of the hill. Skipper convinces Ginger and Mary Ann they can find husbands on the other side. Professor is trying to invent the wheel. Chief Howell will not permit the others to make the trip. He locks Skipper and Gilligan up. Ginger tries to seduce the Chief into letting Skipper and Gilligan go. While she's kissing Chief, Lovey comes by and clubs Chief on the head. The cave people are about to make the trip when they see a large dinosaur. Gilligan wakes up. Professor realizes that he made a mistake and the tablets actually tell how to get on the island.
94	26	"Slave Girl"	Wilbur D'Arcy	Michael Fessier	March 20, 1967	1625–0529	11.03
Gilligan rescues Kalani from drowning in the lagoon after she capsizes her canoe. She now vows to be his slave for life. Professor learns Kalani is a Matoba native girl. Ginger and Mary Ann want to get Kalani to do their chores. The Howells want her as a maid. Kalani says she will only work for her Master. Gilligan is frustrated with Kalani shadowing his every move. Professor tells Gilligan the only way he can free himself of his predicament is to be killed in mortal combat. Howell is happy to oblige so he can be Kilani's master. They set up a fake fencing duel were Gilligan is killed. Kalani's ex, Ugundi (Michael Forest), shows up on the island and challenges Howell to a duel to the death. Howell gets off the hook when Gilligan reveals he is not dead. Ugundi now challenges Gilligan. Professor comes up with the idea to give Gilligan a serum to make him appear dead. The Howells hear Professor talking to Skipper about the plan. They think Professor is really going to kill Gilligan. Thurston knocks Gilligan out and wants to hide him in his hut. Professor gives Gilligan the serum and it works. Thinking he really is dead, Ugundi wants to cremate Gilligan. To stall for time, Ginger does a dance of the veils. Just as the fire starts, Gilligan comes to. Now the natives believe Gilligan is a Fire God and run away.
95	27	"It's a Bird, It's a Plane" "It's a Bird, It's a Plane, It's Gilligan"	Gary Nelson	Sam Locke & Joel Rapp	March 27, 1967	1625–0530	10.05
A Colonel (Edward Faulkner) and a General (Frank Maxwell) are discussing a new Air Force jet pack. A Lieutenant (Walt Hazzard) delivers a message saying one of the jet packs was lost at sea in the Pacific. The Colonel authorizes a search mission. Gilligan finds the jet pack in the lagoon. Professor says if there's enough fuel in it, someone could get to Hawaii. Professor is running some tests and is constantly interrupted by the castaways. He determines there's enough fuel but the flight would be risky. He is also worried about the fuel losing its potency with time. The Howell's try to trick Gilligan into making the flight. Ginger then tries to seduce Gilligan into using the jet pack. Professor decides to have a test dummy with a note about the castaways make the flight. However, Gilligan accidentally activates the jet pack, using up most of the jet fuel in the process. The radio broadcasts that there will be a fleet of ships in the area searching for the jet pack. There is just enough fuel left to have someone hover high up in the air for a few minutes to be seen. After a test, it is determined that Gilligan will make the flight. Gilligan is up in the air and has the radio with him. The radio reports that the ships have spotted a UFO. Not figuring out that he is the UFO, a frightened Gilligan maneuvers into a thick cloud. The ships lose sight of him and leave. Professor synthesizes more fuel. Gilligan wants to make the trip. He starts the jet pack, but he forgets to strap it on and it flies off.
96	28	"The Pigeon"	Michael Kane	Story by : Jack Raymond & Joel Hammil; Teleplay by : Brad Radnitz	April 3, 1967	1625–0521	9.83
While gathering coconuts, Gilligan discovers a homing pigeon that must have been blown off course by a recent storm. Professor wants to take a couple weeks to nurse the pigeon back to health. The others don't want to wait that long and covertly feed the bird to fatten it up. The pigeon is now to heavy to fly. It will take three weeks to get the bird in flying shape. The bird is finally let free and it flies to its owner, who happens to be Bert (Sterling Holloway), an inmate at Alcatraz. Bert has been messaging back and forth with a certain "old lady Hawkins", and believes the castaways' story to be one of her tall tales. Howell writes the next message, wrapping a $1000 bill inside, and that also fails to convince Bert. The castaways now want to send a picture of themselves in front of the Minnow. Gilligan goes to get the pigeon, but he finds it has become trapped in a cave by a giant spider. Gilligan brings Skipper and Professor to see the spider and Professor says its bite is deadly. Professor develops a cider that should knock the spider out. It doesn't quite work and Gilligan is trapped in the cave. The next spider trap doesn't work and the 4 men are stuck in the cave. The next attempt gets the women trapped in the cave as well. The pigeon winds up scaring the spider away. They get the bird back and send it on its way, but Burt is paroled before he can read the last note. Plot Hole: Six of the seven castaways posed for a picture in front of the Minnow to send to Burt, but the Minnow was destroyed in the first season.
97	29	"Bang! Bang! Bang!"	Charles Norton	Leonard Goldstein	April 10, 1967	1625–0528	9.00
In a Government building, scientist Parsons explains to Agent Michaels (Rudy LaRusso) that they have invented a new type of plastic explosive that can be molded into every day items. Once hardened, the clay is a deadly explosive, set off by the slightest bump. Parsons says that unfortunately a crate of it fell overboard a ship in the Pacific. Gilligan finds the crate in the lagoon. The castaways waste no time in molding it into things they need, like plates and golf balls. A little monkey friend of Gilligan makes off with some of the plastic items. Gilligan looses two fillings from his teeth and Professor replaces them with the plastic. The monkey shows the castaways that the plastic explodes when it throws one of Howell's golf balls. Professor tries to figure out a way to remove Gilligan's fillings. The monkey has stored a bunch of the explosives on the roof of a hut. Professor wants to pull Gilligan's teeth but he and Ginger pass out from the anesthetic not Gilligan. From the roof of a hut, the monkey starts throwing the explosives at the castaways. Gilligan starts to climb up the hut to stop the monkey. He then sneezes out his fillings. Bartlett Robinson as Hartley, a government official.
98	30	"Gilligan, the Goddess"	Gary Nelson	Jack Paritz & Bob Rodgers	April 17, 1967	1625–0502	N/A
King Killiwani (Stanley Adams), the Chief from a nearby island, and two of his men arrive on the island. They follow Ginger and Mary Ann to the camp. Killiwani tells Howell he came in search of a 'White Goddess' to take back to his island. Skipper and Professor come across the King's boat in the lagoon and find a lighter in it. Professor asks Killiwani where he got the lighter and is told ships occasionally come to his island. The castaways believe they could be rescued if a goddess comes forward. All three of the ladies vie to be the goddess. But they find out there is a catch. The goddess will also be sacrificed to a volcano. To protect the women, Skipper, Professor and Howell dress up as girls. Neither one looks good so they force Gilligan to get dressed up. Killiwani takes an instant shine to Gilliana, decides to betray the gods, and keep Gilliana for himself. To distract Killiwani from flirting with Gilliana, Ginger and Mary Ann do a dance routine and Howell tries to do some magic tricks. Killiwani kicks them out of the hut. Gilligan gets out of his dress and wig and runs off. The King believes Gilliana disappeared and there is bad magic on the island and leaves.
