= The Real Gilligan's Island =

American reality television series

- Genre: Reality
- Inspired by: Survivor; Gilligan's Island
- No. of seasons: 2
- No. of episodes: 10

Production
- Executive producers: Sherwood Schwartz; Lloyd J. Schwartz
- Producer: Fred Birckhead
- Production companies: Next Entertainment; Telepictures Productions

Original release
- Network: TBS
- Release: November 30, 2004 – 2005

The Real Gilligan's Island is a reality television series that aired two seasons on TBS in 2004 and 2005. Contestants on the show were required to participate in challenges based on plots from the 1960s television show. Both editions of the show were recorded in the Mexican Caribbean on a location south of Cancun. Pop-punk group Bowling for Soup covered the original Gilligan's Island theme for the show, and the show also featured music from the music producer and songwriter Brett Epstein.

== Combination format ==
The format of the show was a combination of the original show from the 1960s and CBS's Survivor. Contestants were divided into two teams of seven to start the show (14 total contestants). Each team was composed of members that were expected to dress and act like their Gilligan's Island counterpart. Characters used were:

- Gilligan
- the Skipper
- the Millionaire and his Wife
- the Movie Star
- the Professor, and
- Mary Ann

Contestants were picked partly for their real-life resemblance to their characters—real-life millionaires, actresses, and boat owners played their counterparts.

== Competitions of characters and teams ==
=== Initial round: paired competitions ===
In the first round, the teams would participate in a series of competitions that would pit one team's character against the other's (Team A's "Ginger" against Team B's "Ginger," for example) for the right to stay on the island and compete in the second phase of the show. The competitions were set up by having members from the teams venture to "Voodoo Village" to retrieve a chest that, when opened, would reveal a voodoo doll crudely done up to look like a character. The two contestants portraying that character would then compete.

=== Final round: prizes, immunity, and alliances ===
Once the seven finalists were set, the show became very similar to Survivor. Contestants first competed in a challenge for a prize and a chance at immunity from the day's voting. Alliances and strategy was common. The contestants would then all travel to Voodoo Village and engage in a voting ceremony.

== Final challenge ==
Once only three contestants were left, the show wrapped up with a challenge pitting the remaining players against each other. The first season was won by the millionaire Glenn Stearns. The second season was won by the Skipper ("Crazy" Charlie Albert).

== Notable contestants ==
The "Ginger" role was filled by professional actresses. In 2004, Nicole Eggert and Rachel Hunter competed. In 2005, Erika Eleniak and Angie Everhart competed.

In 2004, actress and television personality Mindy Burbano Stearns filled the role of "the Millionaire's Wife" along with her husband, Glenn Stearns, as "the Millionaire".

Zac Turney, who was competing to be Gilligan on season two, was previously a contestant on Legends of the Hidden Temple as a teen, winning his episode.

== The game ==
=== Season 1 ===
Episode Titles	Challenges		Eliminated	Vote
Episode Titles	Reward	Immunity	Eliminated	Vote
Episode 1	Green Team		Skipper Bob^{1}	None ^{2}
Episode 1	Gold Team		Professor Eric	None ^{2}
Episode 2	Gold Team		Mary Ann Amanda	None ^{2}
Episode 2	Gold Team		Millionaires Donna and Bill	None ^{2}
Episode 3	Gold Team		Ginger Nicole	None ^{2}
Episode 3	Gold Team		Gilligan Gooner	None ^{2}
Episode 4	Mary Ann Kate; Gilligan Chris	Millionaire Mindy	Professor Pat	4-3
Episode 4	Mary Ann Kate; Gilligan Chris	Millionaire Glenn	Ginger Rachel	3-2-1
Finale	All	Millionaire Mindy	Skipper Jim	3-2
Finale	None	Mary Ann Kate	Gilligan Chris	2-1-1
Finale	Millionaire Glenn		Millionaire Mindy; Mary Ann Kate	None ^{3}

^1 Skipper Bob was forced to leave the game for medical reasons.

^2 During the team portion, there were no votes cast.

^3 Instead of voting, the Final 3 castaways participated in a final rescue challenge, where the challenge winner would win the game.

=== Season 2 ===
Episode Titles	Challenges		Eliminated	Vote
Episode Titles	Reward	Immunity	Eliminated	Vote
Episode 1	Green Team	Green Team	Skipper Ken	None ^{2}
Episode 1	None		Ginger Angie ^{4}	None ^{2}
Episode 1	Orange Team		Millionaire Howie	None ^{2}
Episode 2	Green Team		Miss Millionaire Donna	None ^{2}
Episode 2	Orange Team		Professor Andy	None ^{2}
Episode 2	Green Team		Mary Ann Mandy	None ^{2}
Episode 2	Orange Team		Gilligan Zac	None ^{2}
Episode 3	Miss Millionaire Melissa; Gilligan Shawn	Skipper Charlie	Millionaire Jim	4-3
Episode 3	Gilligan Shawn; Skipper Charlie; Ginger Erika	Ginger Erika	Miss Millionaire Melissa	4-2
Finale	Skipper Charlie	Skipper Charlie	Mary Ann Randi	4-1
Finale	None	Gilligan Shawn	Professor Tiy-E	2-2
Finale	Skipper Charlie ^{3}		Gilligan Shawn; Ginger Erika	None

^4 Ginger Angie was forced to leave the game because of medical reasons. Therefore, there did not need to be a head-to-head for the Gingers.
