= Gilligan's Island season 2 =

Gilligan's Island
- Season 2
- No. of episodes: 32

Release
- Original network: CBS
- Original release: September 16, 1965 – April 28, 1966

Season chronology
- ← Previous; Season 1 Next → Season 3

The second season of the American comedy television series Gilligan's Island commenced airing in the United States on September 16, 1965, and concluded on April 28, 1966, on CBS. The second season continues the comic adventures of seven castaways as they attempt to survive and escape from an island on which they had been shipwrecked. Most episodes revolve around the dissimilar castaways' conflicts and their failed attempts—invariably Gilligan's fault—to escape their plight. The season originally aired on Thursdays at 8:00-8:30 pm (EST). Unlike the first season, this season was shot in color.

== Production ==
Executive producers for the second season of Gilligan's Island included William Froug and series creator Sherwood Schwartz. Filming of the season took place at the CBS Radford Studios complex in Studio City, Los Angeles, California. This complex contained 17 sound stages, as well as special effects and prop departments. On one part of the studio lot, a lagoon had been constructed by the production company "at great expense". According to Bob Denver, the crew would spend half of their days filming scenes in the lagoon. Scenes involving the castaways' huts and or the jungle, were shot on a soundstage. After the series' cancellation, the show's lagoon was not dismantled, and it remained in place until 1995, when it was converted into a parking lot.

== Cast ==
The series employed an ensemble cast of seven main actors and actresses. Denver played the role of the titular First Mate Gilligan, a bumbling, naive, and accident-prone crewman who often messes up the castaways chances of rescue. Alan Hale Jr. portrayed The Skipper, captain of the S.S. Minnow and the older friend of Gilligan. Jim Backus appeared as Thurston Howell III, a millionaire, and Natalie Schafer played his wife, Eunice Lovelle Wentworth Howell. Tina Louise played the role Ginger Grant, a famous movie star. Russell Johnson portrayed Professor Roy Hinkley, Ph.D., a high school science teacher who often uses his scientific background to try to find ways to get the castaways off the island. Dawn Wells played Mary Ann Summers, wholesome farm girl from Kansas. Charles Maxwell was the uncredited voice of the radio announcer, to whom the castaways would often listen via their radio.

== Broadcast history ==
The season originally aired Thursdays at 8:00–8:30 pm (EST) on CBS.

== DVD release ==
The DVD was released by Warner Home Video, with an interdiction by the creator and members of the cast.

== Episodes ==
No. overall	No. in season	Title	Directed by	Written by	Original release date	Prod. code	U.S. households (in millions)
37	1	"Gilligan's Mother-in-Law"	Jack Arnold	Budd Grossman	September 16, 1965	1625–0752	12.37
A native family arrives on the island looking for a husband for their overweight daughter. The daughter sees Gilligan and says that's the man she wants. Gilligan, Skipper and Howell see the Mother, Father and daughter. They initially think the daughter wants to marry Skipper and the other men say it could be a way to get off the island. Skipper says he won't do it. Professor can speak some of their language and learns it's Gilligan the daughter wants. Gilligan runs away, but the natives find him. The Father says that Gilligan must pass some "marriage tests". The castaways want Gilligan to play along in hopes that they might be able to get off the island. Gilligan passes and now the groom's family must throw a party. At the party, Gilligan has to join in a wedding dance. But then a Native Warrior (Eddie Little Sky) shows up to challenge Gilligan to a duel for the daughter. A spear throwing duel will happen in the morning. Gilligan throws his spear and it winds up in a coconut tree. As the Warrior is about to throw, coconuts drop on his head and knock him out. The daughter says she wants to marry the Warrior. Note: Jim Backus' real-life wife Henny Backus has a cameo as the wife of the chief. Jim Backus impersonates entertainer Ted Lewis in this episode.
38	2	"Beauty Is as Beauty Does"	Jack Arnold	Joanna Lee	September 23, 1965	1625–0757	11.57
The castaways hear about the Miss Globe beauty pageant on the radio. Each of the other men nominate a different woman as the fairest on the island, with the Skipper nominating Ginger, Mr. Howell nominating his wife, and the Professor nominating Mary Ann. Gilligan suggests a beauty contest to decide Miss Castaway. The men work with their girls on looks and poise. Gilligan has a conversation with Gladys the Monkey (Janos Prohaska). Gilligan has to cast the deciding vote, so everybody else tries to influence his vote. Gilligan is with Gladys again and Skipper comes by to talk to him about Ginger. Professor does the same about Mary Ann. While Gilligan tells Gladys his doesn't know what he's going to do, Howell comes by and at first tries to bribe Gilligan. It's time for the pageant and Professor introduces the contestants. Then it's the charm and poise segment. Next is the talent portion and the men resort to some sabotage. Gilligan winds up picking Gladys the Monkey as the winner, simply because she's the only true native to the island.
39	3	"The Little Dictator"	Jack Arnold	Bob Rodgers & Sid Mandel	September 30, 1965	1625–0755	11.08
El Presidente Pancho Hernando Gonzales Enrico Rodriguez of Ecuarico (Nehemiah Persoff) is exiled on the island. Because he has a gun, he tells the castaways that he is now the President of the island. He foments a revolution and the men decide they have to find a way for Pancho to fire off his remaining bullets. They do get him to shoot a couple times and he now has two bullets left. They then try to trap him in a net, but Gilligan messes that up. Pancho wants to shoot Gilligan, but when there are no bullets left, the men jump him. Pancho believes he will be executed, but Lovey tells him he will just be one of them. Pancho tries to get Gilligan to become his puppet leader. Gilligan dreams that he is the ruler of a small country and the castaways are his cabinet. His cabinet sings his praises, but then tell him that things aren't going well in his country. Pancho tries to tell him everything is fine. Gilligan wakes up and goes to tell Pancho he won't be his puppet. Some of Rodriguez's men come back for him and he tells the castaways he will send a boat back for them. They later hear on their radio that Rodriguez had been exiled once again. Note: This episode is in effect a satire of the military politics of many Latin American countries during the 1960s, and is series creator Sherwood Schwartz's personal favorite.
40	4	"Smile, You're on Mars Camera"	Jack Arnold	Al Schwartz & Bruce Howard	October 14, 1965	1625–0751	11.35
Gilligan is collecting feathers for Mr. Howell, who wants to make a pillow for Lovey. Meanwhile, a Mars Probe accidentally lands on the island instead of on Mars. However, the scientists, Professor John Corwell (Booth Colman) and Professor George Bancroft (Arthur Peterson Jr.), believe it has landed on Mars. At first the Probe's camera isn't working, but then the scientists see a primitive hut before the camera stops again. The scientists believe there's life on Mars. Gilligan discovers the Probe and they bring it back to camp. The castaways hope to use it to provide visual evidence to the world that they are still alive. Professor has to repair it first, but the lens is missing. Gilligan finds the lens, but breaks it. They set about to make a glue to fix the lens. The lens is repaired and the castaways get ready to be seen. Gilligan's boiling glue explodes and covers the castaways. They then get covered with a multitude of feathers, which has the scientists reaching the conclusion that they've discovered a race of chicken people. When Gilligan goes to get the signs they made, he trips over the Probe and breaks it. Larry Thor as a Newscaster.
41	5	"The Sweepstakes"	Jack Arnold	Walter Black	October 21, 1965	1625–0758	12.32
The Howell's have set up a private country club on the island. Gilligan is their steward. They are listening to the radio and the winning number of the Argentinian Sweepstakes is announced. Gilligan has the winning ticket and can claim the million dollars at any time. Howell tells Gilligan he may join their exclusive club. After feeling lonely, Gilligan issues IOUs to the others so they may also become members. The Howell's are not happy about it and they want to see Gilligan's winning ticket. He quickly misplaces the ticket and they all get evicted. Howell is mad at himself for letting Gilligan into his club without actually seeing the ticket. The others search for the ticket but don't find it. Howell has a dream that he's a prospector in the Old West and has found a lot of gold. He goes to the Claims office in town and gets a receipt for his claim. Howell writes out IOU's for services in town. He loses his claim receipt and can't pay the IOU's and is about to be hanged. After he wakes up, Howell finds Gilligan's ticket and realizes it was from last year. Howell doesn't say anything about it and lets Gilligan and the others back into his club. Note: The saloon used in the dream sequence is the same set used for 20 seasons as the interior of the Long Branch Saloon in the series Gunsmoke. Mrs. Howell does not appear in the dream sequence, making this the only dream sequence without all seven castaways.
42	6	"Quick Before It Sinks"	George Cahan	Stan Burns & Mike Marmer	October 28, 1965	1625–0760	12.32
The Professor believes that the island is sinking because the measuring stick he has in the lagoon is getting lower. The men don't want to break the news to the women. Professor comes up with the idea to keep above the water as long as possible by building a hut on the island's highest point. Lovey tells the men that the women want them to landscape around all the huts. Despite being tired from working all day, the men start building a hut during the night. This goes on for a couple days. Professor checks his stick and the water is even higher. He thinks they'll be underwater in as little as six days. The men delegate Gilligan to tell the women. Gilligan tries to tell Ginger, but she thinks they're being rescued. The men pretend to have built a transmitter and have Gilligan disguise his voice and communicate with them. The women figure out what they're doing. After finally telling the women, they decide to build an ark, but it falls apart. In the end, it turns out the island isn't sinking, but Gilligan was using the Professor's stick to catch lobster, and was moving it.
43	7	"Castaways Pictures Presents"	Jack Arnold	Herbert Finn & Alan Dinehart	November 4, 1965	1625–0754	12.97
Gilligan discovers a sunken ship in the lagoon. The ship is only half there, but the cargo is intact: two crates of silent movie production equipment and costumes. The Professor then comes up with the idea to make a film telling their story, send it out on a raft, and hope for rescue. Mr. Howell is the director and he has a difficult time with the amateur actors. While processing the film, Professor ran into some technical difficulties which result in what can only be viewed as a comedy. The castaways are listening to their radio and they hear that the film was found and it proceeds to win the grand prize at the Cannes Film Festival.
44	8	"Agonized Labor"	Jack Arnold	Roland MacLane	November 11, 1965	1625–0753	12.97
Late at night Gilligan and Skipper hear on the radio that Howell Industries has collapsed and the Howells are broke. The next morning, Skipper and Gilligan have a hard time giving the Howells the news. The Howells are finally told they're poor. Lovey finds a suicide note and that Thurston is gone. Everyone begins to search for him. Howell is wandering around the island trying to find a painless way to end it all. Gilligan sees him by a cliff. While trying to stop Howell from jumping, Gilligan falls off the edge and grabs a plant limb. Skipper and Gilligan eventually bring Howell back. Professor suggests they try to train the Howells for other lines of work for after they are rescued. No matter what they try, things do not go well. Mary Ann finds a note that says the Howells plan to jump off a cliff. In the end, they hear on the radio that it was Powell Industries that collapsed, and the Howells' wealth is still intact.
45	9	"Nyet, Nyet — Not Yet"	Jack Arnold	Adele T. Strassfield & Robert Riordan	November 18, 1965	1625–0763	13.83
Two Soviet cosmonauts, Ivan (Danny Klega) and Igor (Vincent Beck), land on the island, way off course from their target. Igor tells Gilligan, Skipper and Professor that a Russian submarine will come for them. They want to get their capsule out of the lagoon without it tipping over and getting water in it. Both party's believe the other are there to possibly set up a base. Professor would like to get in the capsule to hopefully send a message. Ginger lures Igor away from the capsule. Gilligan and Professor get into the capsule and Gilligan shorts out the radio. Ivan and Igor catch them. Professor repairs the radio and they learn that the submarine will arrive the next day at 11 o'clock. Igor wants to celebrate and shows Ivan some vodka he smuggled on the capsule. The girls start packing and prepare to leave the island. Gilligan overhears Igor and Ivan saying they can't bring the castaways back with them because they will tell the world the cosmonauts made a mistake. They will get the castaways drunk and then tie them up. Howell suggests that Gilligan puts water in one of the vodka bottles and marks it. That night, Igor and Ivan drink with the men and the Russians wind up passing out. The men bring the two to their capsule in the morning. When they come back later at the scheduled time, the capsule and Russians are gone. In the end Gilligan messed things up by setting his watch to the wrong time. Later that night, Gilligan and the Skipper hear a radio broadcast and learn the real reason they left them behind.
46	10	"Hi-Fi Gilligan"	Jack Arnold	Mary C. McCall, Jr.	November 25, 1965	1625–0762	11.67
Because of a coming typhoon, Skipper and Gilligan are putting supplies in one of the caves. Skipper accidentally hits Gilligan in the mouth. Gilligan's mouth becomes a radio when a filling in a tooth is knocked loose. Everyone wants Gilligan to provide their own station, from exercise programs to the Academy Awards. Professor continues to track the typhoon with their radio. At night, Gilligan's open mouth and constant blaring of music prevents anyone from sleeping. When he's near the castaways radio, he causes interference. A second accident restores Gilligan to normal but he has now also damaged the radio. Now they can't hear about the typhoon. Thurston suggests hitting Gilligan in the mouth to make him a radio again. After several attempts to make Gilligan a radio again, Gilligan himself does it. The typhoon is close. Everyone has a hard time fitting into the cave. When the storm hits, something Gilligan does winds up saving everyone.
47	11	"The Chain of Command"	Leslie Goodwins	Arnold & Lois Peyser	December 2, 1965	1625–0761	12.59
The castaways are afraid of a possible headhunter invasion. After almost being killed by a falling tree, Skipper wonders who could take charge should anything happen to him. Skipper has to settle for Gilligan when the others don't seem right. Skipper tries to get Gilligan to look and act like a leader, but that doesn't go well. Later, Gilligan finds Skipper's hat and a note saying he's been captured. Gilligan wants to take over, but both Professor and Howell believe they can be in charge. Professor and Howell wind up arguing with each other over how to find Skipper. Mary Ann gives Gilligan a pep talk and he takes charge. They set a trap and wind up catching Skipper. Turns out there were no natives and the Skipper just staged the whole thing to test Gilligan. Janos Prohaska as the gorilla.
48	12	"Don't Bug the Mosquitoes"	Steve Binder	Brad Radnitz	December 9, 1965	1625–0764	14.10
In a parody of The Beatles and Beatlemania, the music sensation "The Mosquitoes" (Les Brown, Jr. and The Wellingtons) land on the island for much needed peace and quiet. The guys agree to take the castaways back home when they leave. But, they're not happy when Ginger and Mary Ann can't keep their hands off of them. The Mosquitoes give a concert and then announce they want to stay on the island for a month. The castaways hope to make The Mosquitoes' lives miserable so they'll want to leave--and take the castaways with them. The band says they'll leave the next day. But the next morning the band says they're staying for 2 months, maybe longer. The band's constant playing is driving the castaways crazy. The men decide to form a band called The Gnats hoping The Mosquitoes will make them their back-up band. The Mosquitoes think The Gnats are awful. The girls form a group of their own, "The Honeybees", and they are very good. The Mosquitoes end up leaving without them because they see The Honeybees as competition.
49	13	"Gilligan Gets Bugged"	Gary Nelson	Jack Gross, Jr. & Michael R. Stein	December 16, 1965	1625–0766	12.32
Skipper thinks Gilligan may have been bitten by the dreaded, and deadly, Mantis Khani. Professor says that if he was bitten, Gilligan has only 24 hours to live. They'll have to watch for the symptoms which are pain in the joints, loss of appetite, and itching. Gilligan does display the symptoms, but it's because he hit his hand while building a bath tub, he ate a lot of bananas and the Howell's see him scratching himself. A 'going away party' ends with everyone drifting away in tears, leaving the guest of honor alone and wondering where they all went. Professor says that he may be able to make an antidote, but they'll have to substitute ingredients. Things grow worse when Professor learns that the Mantis Khani travels in such swarms that by nightfall all of them will have been bitten and are doomed. Gilligan knows that Professor is working on an experiment, but no one will tell him what it's for. Skipper is bitten by one of the insects and he tells Gilligan the truth. One by one the others wind up bitten. Later on, after doing some more research, the Professor allows one to bite him, revealing that these bugs are not poisonous after all.
50	14	"Mine Hero"	Wilbur D'Arcy	David Braverman & Bob Marcus	December 23, 1965	1625–0759	N/A
Skipper is building a raft to attach an S.O.S. message to. Gilligan catches a World War II mine while fishing in the lagoon and accidentally triggers it. Gilligan tries to tell Skipper what he caught, but Skipper is too busy to listen to him. The Professor tries to round up enough metal to make an anchor for a raft to keep it in the shipping lanes. He made a sand timer that will drop the anchor when it gets to the right place. Gilligan tells the Howell's about the mine and they think it's a gold or diamond mine. Professor still needs more metal and Gilligan mentions his iron mine. Gilligan takes the men to the mine and they hear it ticking. Professor goes to see if he can disarm the mine. Because the mine is magnetized, Gilligan's neck chain and Howell's watch drag and attach both of them to the mine. Professor figures out a way to free them. Professor realizes there's no way to disarm the mine. After he hears Professor suggest it, Gilligan uses the raft to tow the mine out to sea. The mine floats back, explodes and covers the beach with fish.
51	15	"Erika Tiffany Smith to the Rescue"	Jack Arnold	David P. Harmon	December 30, 1965	1625–0765	13.67
Socialite Erika Tiffany-Smith (Zsa Zsa Gabor) arrives on the island. She is looking for a place to build a resort and is thinking of buying the island. The Skipper instantly falls for her. Gilligan tells the Howell's and Professor about Erika. The Howell's know her and are not fond of her, but will be polite. Erika meets Professor and takes an immediate liking to him. Skipper asks Ginger's advice on how to get Erika to notice him. Professor and Erika are getting along very well and wind up engaged. While at first excited, Professor comes to realize that they are not meant for each other. Erika asks Howell to tell Professor that it isn't going to work between them. Erika leaves, promising to be back soon. It's been three days and Erika hasn't returned. While listening to the radio, the Professor, Gilligan and the Skipper hear that Erika Tiffany-Smith's logbook has no longitude or latitude, so the US Navy won't be able to find the island. Michael Witney as Johnny, Erika's boat driver.
52	16	"Not Guilty"	Stanley Z. Cherry	Roland MacLane	January 6, 1966	1625–0767	12.43
While fishing in the lagoon, Gilligan reels in a crate full of coconuts and newspapers. Who killed Randolph Blake? According to one of the newspapers one of the castaways did it the night before the fateful tour. Skipper and Gilligan wonder who it could be. They go to see Professor and he's using a guillotine he just made to cut open coconuts. They then go to see Ginger and Mary Ann who are cooking up some poison to kill the mice around the huts. The paper said that Blake was killed with a spear gun. Skipper and Gilligan even start to suspect each other. Howell finds the newspaper clipping after it falls out of Skipper's pants pocket. Then Mary Ann and Ginger see the paper and tell Professor. The castaways hold a meeting. Five of the castaways actually knew Mr. Blake, and each had a motive to kill him. So, they recreate the crime in order to find out who among them is the murderer. When none of the five seem to have done it, the Skipper and Gilligan discover that slamming the door is what caused the spear gun to fire, killing the victim, so no one is guilty. A radio report confirms the castaways discovery. Note: Well-known Cincinnati news anchor Al Schottelkotte has an off-screen cameo as himself as the radio announcer.
53	17	"You've Been Disconnected"	Jack Arnold	Elroy Schwartz	January 13, 1966	1625–0756	11.67
A storm washes an international underwater telephone cable onto the shore of the lagoon. Professor is sure they can try to call for help. Meanwhile, Ginger hears on the radio that Hollywood will film "The Ginger Grant Story". Professor is having a hard time cutting through the metal casing of the cable. Ginger is writing down things that happened on the island for the movie and a lot of it involves Gilligan messing things up. Professor rigs up a blow torch and melts some of the metal off the cable and exposes the wires. Next they have to monitor the calls to find one with a language they can understand. Professor then builds a telephone. The castaways get several calls out, but none of them produce any results. Another storm comes and washes the cable back out to sea. The castaways assume a repair crew will be dispatched to repair the wires, but courtesy of Gilligan's sealing it, there's no need for one. Sandra Gould as Telephone Operator. Ann Robinson as St. Louis' Bijou Theater Operator.
54	18	"The Postman Cometh"	Leslie Goodwins	Herbert Finn & Alan Dinehart	January 20, 1966	1625–0769	11.19
Gilligan has been helping Mary Ann send out letters in a bottle to her hometown sweetheart Horace Higgenbothum. Gilligan and Skipper hear on the radio that Horace married a wealthy shipping heiress. The men can't bring themselves to tell Mary Ann. After Ginger suggests it, Gilligan, Skipper, and Professor try to boost her confidence by competing for her attention. They each take a different romantic approach. She leaves and tells the Howell's and Ginger what happened. When she returns, she overhears the three men talking. Mary Ann believes they are trying to tell her she is dying from eating poisonous mushrooms. After listening to her favorite radio soap opera, Mary Ann decides to be brave about her dying. She tells everyone she knows what's going on. They think she's talking about Horace and she is saddened when they make light of the situation. Mary Ann dreams that she is a terminally ill patient on the radio soap opera. When she is finally told about Horace, Mary Ann reveals she didn't think all that much of him. She only pretended there was a romance because she didn't want the others to think she had no one.
55	19	"Seer Gilligan"	Leslie Goodwins	Elroy Schwartz	January 27, 1966	1625–0772	11.78
Gilligan is answering Skipper's questions before he even asks them. Skipper tells everyone that Gilligan can read minds. Professor is skeptical. Gilligan then proceeds to read everyone else's minds. Gilligan doesn't know what he did to cause his power. While Ginger is trying to give Gilligan a psychiatric examination, he's eating some seeds. When Ginger eats some, she can suddenly read his mind. Professor learns about the seeds and says it is possible they caused the power. Gilligan is sleeping and some of the castaways try to get him to say where he got the seeds. The next day Professor says he read up on the subject and learned that the effect is only temporary. Gilligan shows up with seeds for everyone. But everyone begins to fight and argue when they start reading each others minds. Gilligan burns the bush with the seeds so they can all be friends again.
56	20	"Love Me, Love My Skipper"	Tony Leader	Herbert Finn & Alan Dinehart	February 3, 1966	1625–0770	11.62
Everybody mistakenly believes that The Skipper wasn't invited to the Howells' cotillion. They plan to hold a masquerade party of their own and not invite the Howells. Everyone R.S.V.P.s that they won't attend the cotillion. The Howell's are stunned that no one will attend their party and they weren't invited to the masquerade party. Lovey wonders what Thurston may have done to offend the others. The Howell's have a fight and separate. Gilligan later finds Skipper's dropped invitation. Skipper goes to tell Lovey about the lost invite. He tries to talk Lovey into forgiving Thurston, but she won't do it. Gilligan talks to Thurston but he wants nothing to do with Lovey. The others come up with a plan to get the Howell's to attend the party. It's time for the masquerade party. The Howells arrive and get back together.
57	21	"Gilligan's Living Doll"	Leslie Goodwins	Bob Stevens	February 10, 1966	1625–0768	11.89
A robot parachutes on to the island. Professor believes that whoever sent it will come looking for it and they will be rescued. Professor learns that he can program it to do the chores on the island. Things don't go well when they try to get the robot to sweep, do the dishes and do the laundry. A radio broadcast reveals that a search for the lost robot will not be conducted. Professor insists that they can program it to rescue them. Professor asks the robot to build them a boat, but it turns out to be a small toy boat. Ginger tries to seduce the robot into getting her off the island. Skipper wonders if the robot could swim to Hawaii, but Professor finds it's not built to do that. Professor puts a message about the castaways in the robots memory bank and then sends it off to walk under water to Hawaii. The castaways hear on the radio that the robot made it to Hawaii. But the recorded message is all scrambled. The scientists find a rabbit's foot in the robot. Gilligan attached it for good luck but it demagnetized the memory bank.
58	22	"Forward March"	Jerry Hopper	Jack Raymond	February 17, 1966	1625–0771	11.73
Someone threw a hand grenade at Skipper and Gilligan. The men are trying to decide a plan of action. They consider surrendering, but then change their minds. While they're talking, another grenade is thrown not far from them. Howell wants to organize an army and appoints himself General. Skipper and Professor split up and start searching the island. Howell instructs the ladies to become nurses and Ginger to entertain the troops. Skipper and Professor return without finding anything. Then someone starts firing at them with a machine gun. Gilligan scratches himself and Howell sends him to the nurses. While there, Ginger sings It Had to Be You to Gilligan. The machine gun is found. The men then see a gorilla (Janos Prohaska) and it throws another grenade. Howell fires the machine gun and scares the gorilla away. It turns out the gorilla found a stash of World War II weapons in a cave. The problem lies in trying to remove the grenades before they can be used again. The gorilla captures Gilligan. It's actually Gilligan who comes up with the solution, teaching the gorilla to throw the grenades into the lagoon, where their explosions merely cause splashing.
59	23	"Ship Ahoax"	Leslie Goodwins	Charles Tannen & George O'Hanlon	February 24, 1966	1625–0773	11.35
The Professor believes the castaways may be beginning to suffer from "Island Madness". Everyone has been fighting with each other lately. With some cards she has, Ginger plays a trick and convinces Gilligan she can foretell the future. Professor gets Ginger to agree to make everyone believe that a boat is coming to rescue them. He wants to give everyone something to hope for. They start by getting information from the radio and then have Ginger make the predictions to Gilligan. Gilligan tells the people the different things Ginger said would happen and no one believes it. They then hear a later broadcast on the radio that has everything that Ginger said would happen. They now believe Ginger has the power. That night, Ginger looks into a crystal ball and tells the castaways that several ships are coming. The castaways then hear a broadcast announcing that actual ships will be in their area looking for a missing destroyer. Ginger now actually believes she can see the future and will give individual readings. They later hear that the ships found the missing destroyer and will no longer be close to the island. Professor wants Ginger to make another boat prediction because it will make the others happy. Gilligan breaks Ginger's crystal ball so she will now give a séance. Eventually Ginger confides that she's a fake, but the islanders are no longer fighting amongst each other. What they don't know is that a large ship actually passed by the island. Note: NFL Films narrator John Facenda has an off-screen cameo as himself as a radio announcer.
60	24	"Feed the Kitty"	Leslie Goodwins	J.E. Selby & Richard Sanville	March 3, 1966	1625–0776	12.11
A crate carrying a lion washes off a ship and onto the island and the lion gets out. The men go looking for the lion, but get frightened. The women actually come in contact with the lion and run to their huts. The lion winds up in the Howell's hut and the girls try to trap it in there. While looking for the women, Gilligan goes in the Howell's hut. Gilligan befriends the lion by pulling a thorn from its paw. But while the other castaways are scared for their lives, the lion immediately makes a bond with Gilligan. Unwilling to have his new friend put in a cage, Gilligan wanders off with the lion. Gilligan uses cans of corned beef to train it. Howell comes by with Gilligan's lunch and is shown some of the lion's tricks. Gilligan asks Howell if he would finance a new circus when they get off the island. Ginger wants to be in the circus as well. Gilligan asks Skipper to be a clown in the circus. Eventually Gilligan runs out of corned beef and he thinks the lion ate the Skipper. Skipper shows up and Gilligan agrees to have the lion caged. A high tide takes the cage out to sea. Later, the radio reports a ship found the lion. Note: During filming of this episode, the lion tried to attack Bob Denver. The lion's trainer asked the cast to keep this a secret from his employer, fearing he would be fired.
61	25	"Operation: Steam Heat"	Stanley Z. Cherry	Terence & Joan Maples	March 10, 1966	1625–0777	11.67
Gilligan finds a thermal vent and soon everyone wants piping-hot water for showers, washing dishes and baths. Professor is not so excited, because this means there is an active volcano on the island. He goes off to search the island. Gilligan builds a pipeline to bring the hot water to everyone at camp. But the pipeline is full of leaks. Howell tries to bribe Gilligan into making sure only he gets the hot water. Professor is finding all the warning signs of a large volcanic eruption and tells the others. He wants to build a bomb to help stop the eruptions from the volcano. Ginger tells Gilligan how they stopped a volcano in the movies by sacrificing two people who jumped into it. Skipper thinks that Gilligan accidentally drank the nitroglycerin that Professor made. Skipper is worried Gilligan will blow up. After talking to Professor it turns out that it was just water. Gilligan and Ginger add to the chaos by falling into a tunnel. Things get quite chaotic when Professor and Skipper try to deploy the bomb. They throw the bomb into the tunnel and Gilligan catches it. Gilligan throws it up and Skipper catches it. Skipper falls into the tunnel with the bomb. Professor uses a vine to get the others out of the tunnel, but the bomb is caught on Gilligan's foot. In the end the bomb is successfully dropped, and the eruptions are stopped.
62	26	"Will the Real Mr. Howell Please Stand Up?"	Jack Arnold	Budd Grossman	March 17, 1966	1625–0778	10.71
Gilligan hears on the radio that Mr. Howell has been rescued. He goes to tell the Howell's and they listen to the imposter tell his tale. The fake Howell tells the Interviewer (George N. Neise) that he plans to start selling off his stocks. The real Mr. Howell offers his fellow castaways a one million dollar reward to get him off the island so he can save his fortune. Every time Howell hears what the fake Howell wants to sell, he tries swimming back to the mainland. The castaways pool their ideas and will split the money. Professor decides his idea is the best. He wants to build a pontoon boat. They launch the boat and it immediately sinks. The radio states that the fake Howell has flown to Hawaii and will board a yacht for a Pacific cruise. Howell is becoming despondent and Professor wants to help him get over his obsession with money. The radio reports that the fake Howell has fallen off his yacht. The fake Howell winds up on the island. He knocks out the real Howell and switches clothes with him. The castaways don't know which is the real Mr. Howell. But, another radio report answers the question. The fake Howell swims away. Note: Jim Backus plays both Mr. Howell and the imposter.
63	27	"Ghost a Go-Go"	Leslie Goodwins	Roland MacLane	March 24, 1966	1625–0779	11.24
During the night, Gilligan sees what he thinks is a ghost. Skipper thinks he imagined it and tells Gilligan to not say anything about it to the others. Everyone else noticed strange things happening. The next night, Skipper sees the ghost. Professor thinks there has to be a logical explanation for the ghost sightings. Mary Ann says that there's a white sheet missing and they all go looking for it. The ghost tells Gilligan that the castaways must leave the island and soon. Skipper and Gilligan find a boat by the lagoon with a note that says it's from the ghost. Skipper tells everyone to only take the bare essentials as the boat isn't that big. But they all want to take a lot of stuff. Professor is suspicious and wants to send the boat out with dummies on it first. That night they set the boat adrift. A short way out, the boat explodes. The castaways then decide to terrorize the ghost by pretending to be ghosts themselves. The ghost runs into the lagoon and swims away. Richard Kiel guest-stars as the "Ghost" (actually a foreign agent whose government wants the island's offshore drilling rights).
64	28	"Allergy Time"	Jack Arnold	Budd Grossman	March 31, 1966	1625–0780	10.01
Skipper is sneezing and itching and Professor is concerned. The next day, Skipper feels fine, but then starts sneezing again. Professor examines Skipper and finds no evidence of a tropical disease. Professor believes Skipper is allergic to Gilligan. Gilligan moves in with Professor. Professor and soon everyone else starts sneezing when Gilligan is around. Gilligan moves to the other side of the island. The others feel bad and want to bring him back. They find Gilligan, but they all sneeze so much that they leave. Professor comes up with a vaccine for everyone to take and they proceed to do so. After the others have taken their painful shot, Gilligan tells them he has discovered that it was the papaya nut oil he was using as a hair tonic that caused the sneezing, much to everyone else's dismay. To get back at Gilligan, Skipper and Professor want to give him a shot with a very large needle.
65	29	"The Friendly Physician"	Jack Arnold	Elroy Schwartz	April 7, 1966	1625–0775	9.31
Mad scientist Dr. Boris Balinkoff (Vito Scotti in his third of four guest appearances) comes to "rescue" the castaways. Because the boat he arrived in is too small, Boris first brings the Skipper and Gilligan to his nearby island. They will then sail Balinkoff's yacht back for the others. When they get to Balinkoff's mansion, he says he forgot that his crew took the yacht for repairs. The mansion reminds Skipper and Gilligan of a haunted house. The two then meet the Doctor's servant Igor (Mike Mazurki) and a dog that meows. Balinkoff goes back for the others and overhears Ginger say she's a little suspicious. Gilligan finds a cat that barks and he and Skipper wind up in a hidden room that looks like a torture chamber. Skipper gets stuck in a Medieval stock. After they leave the chamber, Balinkoff explains to them that he's been doing mind transfer experiments on animals. Igor chains up Gilligan and Skipper. The other castaways are in the mansion and they learn he will experiment on them. Balinkoff starts to have all their minds transferred. With the help of Ginger (in Igor's body), the castaways are freed. Professor (in Mary Ann's body) returns them to normal. They then transfer Balinkoff and Igor's minds into the cat and dog. The castaways get back to their island and hope to use the boat to get out to the shipping lanes. But the boat sinks and is not sea worthy.
66	30	"'V' for Vitamins"	Jack Arnold	Barney Slater	April 14, 1966	1625–0781	10.49
Skipper is fealing weak and Professor examines him. Professor tells the men that if they don't find a way to grow more citrus fruits, they risk dying from vitamin deficiencies. Skipper, as the heavest one on the island, is the first to fall ill and the others will soon follow. Gilligan finds an orange and tells everyone it was the last one. After some try to get the orange away from Gilligan, he decides they each will get a slice. Professor says that won't help. After the orange shrivels up in the sun, they plant the seeds. That night, Gilligan must guard the seeds and make sure they stay warm with tiki torches. Gilligan falls asleep and the torches start to go out. Gilligan has a "Jack and the Beanstalk" type of dream. His Mother (Lovey) wants Gilligan to sell her jewels for some oranges. A gangster (Howell) trades Gilligan magic beans that will grow oranges for the jewels. The beans produce a giant beanstalk. Gilligan climbs the stalk into the clouds and finds a castle. The maid at the door (Mary Ann) tells Gilligan a cruel giant lives here and he has a room full of oranges. The maid shows Gilligan the goose that lays the golden oranges. The Giant (Skipper) shows up and Gilligan hides. The Giant finds Gilligan but has to go and slay a dragon. Gilligan grabs the goose but then releases an elderly couple (Professor and Ginger) from a dungeon. The old woman kisses Gilligan and turns into a beautiful young princess. The old man says he's a young prince. The maid reluctantly kisses him, but he tricked her and is still old. The Giant catches Gilligan. Skipper wakes Gilligan up. Professor finds some Grapefruit and Lemon trees. Note: Bob Denver's real-life son Patrick plays small Gilligan in the dream sequence.
67	31	"Mr. and Mrs. ???"	Gary Nelson	Jack Gross, Jr. & Michael R. Stein	April 21, 1966	1625–0774	N/A
The radio announces that the minister who married the Howells was a fraud, so the Howell's marriage is invalid. Lovey now wants to split their money. Ginger suggests that Skipper, as Captain of a ship, marry the Howell's. Professor says it would only be legal at sea. Gilligan says they should just build a raft. Lovey gives Gilligan her ring to hold. Skipper wants to practice the ceremony with Gilligan and Mary Ann and Gilligan is not happy about it. The raft is built and in the lagoon. However, the ring getting stuck on Gilligan's finger and the Howell's getting into a fight causes the wedding to be called off altogether. Howell moves in with Skipper and Gilligan and starts making a lot of demands. Skipper and Gilligan move out. Lovey moves in with the girls. The castaways come up with a plan to make the Howell's jealous by having them 'date' other people. When that plan fails, the Skipper dresses up like a headhunter to scare them together. The Howell's get back together. The next day they hear on the radio that it was another minister with a similar name who was the real fraud. The Howell's have another fight and Thurston moves back in with Skipper and Gilligan.
68	32	"Meet the Meteor"	Jack Arnold	Elroy Schwartz	May 5, 1966	1625–0782	N/A
Skipper and Gilligan witness a meteor crashing onto the island. Professor is concerned that it might be radioactive. He doesn't want the others to know about the meteor until he can test it. While trying to prevent the others from knowing what Professor is doing, Gilligan leads Ginger to believe she'll have a surprise birthday party. He makes Mary Ann think there'll be a Christmas party. The Howell's think they're getting an anniversary party. Professor finds that the meteor is not radioactive, but it's giving off cosmic rays. Professor hopes to use the cosmic rays to signal a plane and get rescued. Professor, Skipper and Gilligan put on homemade lead suits to protect themselves. They put a shield around the meteor to direct the rays upward. Observing that some seedling trees near the meteor have rapidly grown into full grown trees, Professor concludes that the meteor's cosmic rays are speeding up the aging process on the island. Once the rays reach the castaways, they too will age rapidly, and will die of old age in one week. The radio news that an electrical storm will be passing over the island inspires them to build a lightning rod hoping that a bolt of lightning will destroy the meteor. Gilligan dreams that the castaways are 50 years older. The castaways are preparing for a party celebrating 50 years on the island. Just as the storm hits, Gilligan wakes up and gets the rod in place. Lightning hits it and the meteor is destroyed. Note: This episode uses the ending theme of Season 1 by The Wellingtons.
