= Surviving Gilligan's Island =

2001 television film

- Also known as: Surviving Gilligan's Island: The Incredibly True Story of the Longest Three-Hour Tour in History
- Written by: Duane Poole
- Directed by: Paul A. Kaufman
- Starring: Bob Denver; Dawn Wells; Russell Johnson; Jon Wellner; Kristen Dalton; Samantha Harris; Eric Allan Kramer; Steve Vinovich; Aaron Lustig; E. J. Peaker
- Music by: Laura Karpman
- Country of origin: United States
- Original language: English

Production
- Executive producers: Paul A. Kaufman; Dawn Wells; Larry Germain
- Producer: Anthony Santa Croce
- Cinematography: Kenneth D. Zunder
- Editor: Sean Lambert
- Running time: 100 minutes
- Production company: Landscape Entertainment

Original release
- Network: CBS
- Release: October 14, 2001

Surviving Gilligan's Island: The Incredibly True Story of the Longest Three-Hour Tour in History is a 2001 American made-for-television docudrama film based on the 1964–1967 television sitcom Gilligan's Island.

Originally airing on CBS on October 14, 2001, the film stars three of the four cast members from the 1960s series who were still alive at the time: Bob Denver, Dawn Wells, and Russell Johnson. These performers tell their stories, while other actors re-enact old scenes from the series and dramatize behind-the-scenes moments.

== Plot ==
The plot of this docudrama depicts the attempts of Gilligan's Island producer Sherwood Schwartz to make Gilligan's Island a hit television series. It portrays the network's initial rejection of the series as well as the filming of the pilot episode. This film also reveals the changes which each cast member went through after the pilot episode received negative feedback. Denver (who played Gilligan), Wells (who played Mary Ann), and Johnson (who played the Professor) share stories about the show and its status in pop culture. Footage from the original series is unveiled in addition to the recreations.

This film also addresses the question of whether Ginger or Mary Ann is more attractive. An informal poll of 21 people is conducted in which Mary Ann wins by a single vote, despite the fact that Mary Ann has consistently outpolled the glamorous Ginger by a sizable margin and that at the time, Wells, who played Mary Ann, was receiving 3,000– 5,000 fan letters weekly, while Louise, who player Ginger, may have been receiving 1,500 or 2,000.

Cast member Tina Louise, who portrayed Ginger in the series, does not appear. She had consistently refused to participate in any Gilligan's Island-related spin-offs or projects since the original series ended, other than an appearance on The Late Show with Ross Shafer with the rest of the cast in 1988, and a cameo appearance on Roseanne with Denver, Johnson and Wells in 1995 (neither of which is addressed). This docudrama presents Louise to have been under the impression that the series was supposed to revolve around her own character's adventures as a shipwrecked castaway (despite the series' title). It also chronicles Louise's repeated efforts at removing herself from her contract, and the subsequent side effect it would have on the relationships between herself and her co-stars.

This docudrama covers the period from the concept and casting of the first series pilot in 1963 through to its cancellation in 1967; it then touches on moments in the 1970s and early 1980s, including the production of the Gilligan's Island reunion TV movies, and Jim Backus's declining health during that time, and ends with a sequence discussing the deaths of original cast members Alan Hale, Jim Backus and Natalie Schafer, and the present-day (as of 2001) activities of Wells, Denver, and Johnson.

This film has been released on both VHS and DVD in one region only. Special features of the DVD release include the casting of the performers, a trivia game, and other information about the behind-the-scenes look at the series. As of 2020, this DVD is out of print.

== Cast ==
- Bob Denver as himself (also archive footage)
- Dawn Wells as herself (also archive footage)
- Russell Johnson as himself (also archive footage)
- Jon Wellner as Bob Denver (a.k.a. Gilligan)
- Kristen Dalton as Tina Louise (a.k.a. Ginger)
- Samantha Harris as Dawn Wells (a.k.a. Mary Ann)
- Eric Allan Kramer as Alan Hale Jr. (a.k.a. The Skipper)
- E. J. Peaker as Natalie Schafer (a.k.a. Mrs. Howell)
- Steve Vinovich as Jim Backus (a.k.a. Mr. Howell)
- Michael Wiseman as Russell Johnson (a.k.a. The Professor)
- Aaron Lustig as Sherwood Schwartz
- Jerry Van Dyke as himself
- Gloria Grant as Henny Backus
- Tina Louise (archive footage)
- Alan Hale Jr. (archive footage)
- Jim Backus (archive footage)
- Natalie Schafer (archive footage)
