= The Producer =

- Gilligan's Island episode
- Episode no.: Season 3 Episode 72
- Directed by: George Cahan and; Ida Lupino
- Written by: Dee Caruso and; Gerald Gardner
- Production code: 1625–0512
- Original air date: October 3, 1966

Guest appearance
- Phil Silvers

Episode chronology
← Previous "Pass the Vegetables, Please"	Next → "Voodoo"

"The Producer" is the fourth episode of the third season of Gilligan's Island, in which the castaways stage a musical version of Hamlet. It first aired in on October 3, 1966.

== Synopsis ==
After curmudgeonly film producer Harold Hecuba (Phil Silvers) crash lands near the island during an around-the-world talent hunt, the castaways are forced to tolerate him until his rescue plane arrives. When Ginger asks him for a role in his next movie however, Mr. Hecuba laughs at the idea, causing Ginger to become so upset that she refuses to return to civilization with the rest of the castaways.

Hoping to change Mr. Hecuba's mind, Gilligan suggests that they perform a play for Mr. Hecuba so that he might reconsider Ginger's talent and ultimately decide to use her in a movie. From the limited resources available on the island, they create a musical version of William Shakespeare's Hamlet. The cast performs three songs for their show. These parody the "To be, or not to be" speech of act 3, scene 1; the "Get thee to a nunnery" exchange between Hamlet and Ophelia later in the same scene, and Polonius's "Neither a borrower nor a lender be" speech from act 1, scene 3.

The episode employs snippets of dialog taken directly from the original work and musical passages from the operas Carmen and The Tales of Hoffmann. Hamlet's soliloquy is done to the Habanera, Ophelia adapts "Belle nuit, ô nuit d'amour" (the Barcarolle), and Polonius's advice is set to the Toreador Song:

Neither a borrower nor a lender be.
Do not forget: stay out of debt.
Think twice, and take this good advice from me:
Guard that old solvency!
There's just one other thing you ought to do.
To thine own self be true.

Hecuba awakens as the castaways rehearse at night, taking over the production. When help arrives Hecuba departs alone, leaving behind all the others. The show-biz producer’s new plan, announced on the castaways’ radio, is to take full credit for his latest brilliant idea: the musical version of Hamlet he intends to stage as his next project.

== Cast ==
In order of appearance:

- Hamlet: Gilligan
- Claudius: Thurston Howell III
- Gertrude: Mrs. Howell
- Ophelia: Ginger
- Polonius: The Skipper
- Laertes: Mary Ann

The show's only other regular character, The Professor, serves as the production's technical crew.

== Reception ==
=== Ratings ===
The episode was viewed in 9.94 million households on its television premiere, beating new episodes of Iron Horse and The Monkees in the same time slot.

=== Critical reception ===
Although the show Gilligan's Island seldom earned awards of any sort, "The Producer" was selected by TV Guide as one of the 100 greatest television episodes of all time, ranked in the #52 spot. In Gilligan Unbound: Pop Culture in the Age of Globalization, Paul A. Cantor terms the Hamlet production a "full-scale Broadway show" and notes the episode as "evidence of the degree of sophistication the castaways are able to achieve in their supposedly primitive state..." Cantor also observes in an introduction to Hamlet that this episode is one of several recent examples that demonstrate the enduring popularity of Shakespeare's play, since audiences continue to recognize references to the centuries-old drama. Cantor places the episode within the framework of a tradition of Hamlet parodies that dates back to the nineteenth century. Yet Michael D. Bristol interprets these parodies, including the Gilligan's Island episode, as reflective of "a distinctively modern experience of subjectivity" in Shakespeare's version of the character.

== References in other media ==
Part of the first song of the episode is featured in the Space Ghost Coast to Coast episode with Bob Denver, Dawn Wells, and Russell Johnson.
