= Belle nuit, ô nuit d'amour =

Duet from the opera The Tales of Hoffmann

Jacques Offenbach by Nadar (c. 1870s)

"Belle nuit, ô nuit d'amour" ("Beautiful Night, Oh Night of Love" in French, often referred to as the "Barcarolle") is a piece from The Tales of Hoffmann (1881), Jacques Offenbach's final opera. A duet for soprano and mezzo-soprano, it is considered the most famous barcarolle ever written and described in the Grove Book of Operas as "one of the world's most popular melodies." The text, concerning the beauty of the night and of love, is by Jules Barbier.

== The piece ==
Barcarolle
Computer-synthesized (MIDI) version

The piece opens the opera's "Giulietta" act, set in Venice. It is sung by the characters Giulietta – the protagonist Hoffmann's love, a Venetian courtesan – and Nicklausse – Hoffmann's poetic muse, in disguise as his faithful male companion. In addition to the Venetian location it sets the seductive and sinister tone of the Venice act in general and of Giulietta's character specifically. The music reappears later in the act in a septet, "Hélas! Mon cœur s'égare encore," which was constructed by editors of the opera.

"Belle nuit" is in the 6/8 time signature characteristic of barcarolles, allegretto moderato. Approximately a minute of musical introduction occurs before the melody appears, although a flute accompaniment figure which suggests the melody, "suspend[ing] time" and creating anticipation for the melody before it begins, is played throughout the piece. Although it is sung by a juvenile male character, Nicklausse, in a "breeches role", and a female character, Giulietta, the fact of its being fundamentally a piece for two women's voices, intertwining in the same octave, means that in productions where Nicklausse has been played by a male baritone instead of a female mezzo-soprano, his part has been reassigned to a chorus soprano.

Carl Dahlhaus cites the piece as an example of the duplicity of musical banality: in the period of Wagner, when serious opera was marked by chromaticism, Offenbach used the Barcarolle's very consonance to give a sinister feel to the act throughout which it recurs. Dahlhaus attributes this effect to the contrast between the "physical" presence of the vocal line and the ethereal feel of the instrumental introduction, creating a "mirage." "Beneath the music we hear, there seems to be a second musical level descending into the abyss."

== History ==
The Barcarolle does not originate in The Tales of Hoffmann; it was written in 1864 for Offenbach's Die Rheinnixen, where it is sung as "Komm' zu uns" by the chorus of elves in the third act. In Hoffmann, it appeared in the version of 1881; although the third act was cut at the premiere, the location of the second act (Antonia) was changed from Munich to Venice in order to retain the duet, which was sung by offstage chorus and soloists rather than characters.

The Barcarolle inspired English composer Kaikhosru Shapurji Sorabji to write his Passeggiata veneziana sopra la Barcarola di Offenbach (1955–56). Moritz Moszkowski also wrote a virtuoso transcription of it for piano.

Many films have made use of Offenbach's music for the Barcarolle, for example in Life Is Beautiful (1997). The piece (which represents European culture as contrasted with fascist oppression in the film) is used diegetically, first in a scene where Guido sees Dora (the woman he loves) at the opera and later when Guido plays the piece through the concentration camp on a record player and Dora (now his wife) hears it. Other uses include: Titanic (1997) by the ship's orchestra during the evacuation, Walt Disney Silly Symphony "Birds of a Feather" (1931), G.I. Blues (1960), where a jazzed-up version becomes the tune for Elvis Presley's "Tonight is so Right for Love", Dad's Army ("Time on my Hands", 1972), where it is identified as a "German" classical song with a swing rhythm, Margaret (2011), and Midnight in Paris (2011). It is also the tune of "Adrift on a Star" from the musical The Happiest Girl in the World, of Ophelia's song in the Gilligan's Island episode "The Producer", and is used by Sherlock Holmes to set a trap for the criminals in The Adventure of the Mazarin Stone. Bob Dylan's song "I've Made Up My Mind to Give Myself to You", from his album Rough and Rowdy Ways (2020), quotes from the Barcarolle in the guitar accompaniment.

The melody from "Belle nuit, ô nuit d'amour" was also adapted for the 1968 song "Please Don't Go", which was given English lyrics by Les Reed and Jackie Rae. The song was a hit in the UK for Welsh singer Donald Peers, whose version lasted 21 weeks in the UK Singles Chart, peaking at No. 3 in March 1969.

Barcarolle, Tales of Hoffmann has been recounted by many first class passengers on the RMS Titanic as the final piece of music played on April 14th 1912 at the after dinner concert.

"...Yet Titanic was still on her mind. As the countess would relate to historian Walter Lord, she was with friends at a London restaurant in the spring of the following year when she was suddenly overcome with emotion. At first she couldn’t understand what was wrong but soon realized it was because the orchestra was playing “The Tales of Hoffman,” the last selection Titanic’s band played at dinner the night of the sinking."

== Words ==
=== French lyrics ===
Belle nuit, ô nuit d'amour,
Souris à nos ivresses !
Nuit plus douce que le jour !
Ô belle nuit d'amour !

Le temps fuit et sans retour
Emporte nos tendresses;
Loin de cet heureux séjour
Le temps fuit sans retour !

Zéphyrs embrasés.
Versez-nous vos caresses !
Zéphyrs embrasés.
Donnez-nous vos baisers !

Belle nuit, ô nuit d'amour,
Souris à nos ivresses !
Nuit plus douce que le jour !
Ô belle nuit d'amour !

=== English Version ===
Beauteous night, O night of love,
Smile thou on our enchantment;
Radiant night, with stars above,
O beauteous night of love!

Fleeting time doth ne'er return,
But bears on wings our dreaming,
Far away where we may yearn,
For time doth ne'er return.

Sweet zephyrs aglow,
Shed on us thy caresses,
Sweet zephyrs aglow,
Thy soft kisses bestow.

Ah! Beauteous night, O night of love,
Smile thou on our enchantment,
Radiant night with stars above,
O beauteous night of love!
