= How to Break Up a Happy Divorce =

1976 American comedy film

- Genre: Comedy
- Written by: Gerald Gardner; Dee Caruso
- Directed by: Jerry Paris
- Starring: Barbara Eden; Hal Linden; Peter Bonerz; Marcia Rodd
- Music by: Nelson Riddle
- Country of origin: United States
- Original language: English

Production
- Executive producer: Charles W. Fries
- Producers: Gerald Gardner; Dee Caruso
- Cinematography: Richard A. Kelley
- Editors: Bob Moore; Bud Molin
- Running time: 74 minutes
- Production company: Charles Fries Productions

Original release
- Network: NBC
- Release: October 6, 1976

How to Break Up a Happy Divorce is a 1976 American made-for-television comedy film starring Barbara Eden and Peter Bonerz, written and produced by writer partners, Gerald Gardner and Dee Caruso. It was broadcast on NBC on October 6, 1976.

== Plot ==
Ellen (Barbara Eden) and Carter (Peter Bonerz) used to be married, but are now divorced. Ellen is jealous of the woman Carter is dating, so her friend Eve (Marcia Rodd) advises her to try to make him jealous. She gets involved with Tony (Hal Linden), a handsome man-about-town.

== Cast ==
- Barbara Eden as Ellen Dowling
- Hal Linden as Tony Bartlett
- Peter Bonerz as Carter Dowling
- Marcia Rodd as Eve
- Liberty Williams as Jennifer Hartman
- Harold Gould as Mr. Henshaw
- Chuck McCann as Man with hangover
- Archie Hahn as Harassed waiter
