= Aaron Lustig =

American film and television actor (born 1956)

- Born: September 17, 1956 (age 70); Rochester, New York, United States
- Occupation: Actor
- Years active: 1984–present

Aaron Lustig (born September 17, 1956) is an American film and television actor.

== Career ==
He was nominated for an Emmy Award in 1997, for Best Supporting Actor on The Young and the Restless as Tim Reid, whom he has also portrayed on The Bold and the Beautiful. He guest-starred in Criminal Minds as Walter Kern, a serial killer who has been inactive for eighteen years, in the episode "Unfinished Business". He made guest appearances in the seventh season of Desperate Housewives as a transplant coordinator working on the case of Susan Delfino (Teri Hatcher).

== Personal life ==
Lustig currently resides in Sherman Oaks, California.

== Selected filmography ==
- Lily in Love (1984) - Chauffeur
- Leap of Faith (1989, TV Movie) - Dr. Kent
- Naked Lie (1989, TV Movie) - Ellis Scott
- Ghostbusters II (1989) - Norman the Producer
- The Operation (1990, TV Movie) - Anesthesiologist
- Summer Dreams: The Story of the Beach Boys (1990, TV Movie) - Reporter at Beach
- Darkman (1990) - Martin Katz
- Edward Scissorhands (1990) - Psychologist
- Family of Spies (1990, TV Mini-Series) - FBI Agent #1
- Blind Faith (1990, TV Mini-Series) - Medical Examiner
- L.A. Story (1991) - Boring Speaker
- Roadside Prophets (1992) - Morning Desk Clerk
- Bad Channels (1992) - Vernon Locknut
- The Opposite Sex and How to Live with Them (1993) - Movie Bully
- Empty Cradle (1993, TV Movie) - Frazier Lawyer
- The Day My Parents Ran Away (1993, TV Movie) - Teacher Haldeman
- I'll Do Anything (1994) - Jack
- Monkey Trouble (1994) - Store Manager
- Ray Alexander: A Taste for Justice (1994, TV Movie) - Douglas Hirschman
- No Dessert, Dad, till You Mow the Lawn (1994) - Doctor
- The Shadow (1994) - Doctor
- Clear and Present Danger (1994) - Dr. Polk
- Girth of a Nation (1994)
- Scanner Cop II (1995) - Dr. Gordon
- Boys on the Side (1995) - Judge
- Star Trek: Voyager (1995, Episode: "Ex Post Facto") - Dr Tolen Ren
- Stuart Saves His Family (1995) - Fred
- A Mother's Prayer (1995, TV Movie) - Dr. Shapiro
- An Element of Truth (1995, TV Movie) - Cemetery Manager
- The Late Shift (1996, TV Movie) - Paul Shaffer
- If These Walls Could Talk (1996, TV Movie) - Tom (segment "1952")
- After Jimmy (1996, TV Movie) - Mike
- Pinocchio's Revenge (1996) - Dr. Edwards
- The Relic (1997) - Dr. Brown
- Murder in Mind (1997) - Defense Attorney
- Tuesdays with Morrie (1999, TV Movie) - Rabbi Al Axelrod (uncredited)
- Blood Type (1999) - Paul
- Gun Shy (2000) - Larry, Fulvio's Neighbor
- Bedazzled (2000) - Synedyne Supervisor
- Surviving Gilligan's Island (2001, TV Movie) - Sherwood Schwartz
- The Day After Tomorrow (2004) - Bernie
- Jane Doe: Vanishing Act (2005, TV Movie) - Miles Crandell
- Thank You for Smoking (2005) - Doctor
- Transformers: Revenge of the Fallen (2009) - Reporter #1
- Due Date (2010) - Dr. Greene
- The Rum Diary (2011) - Monk
- The Five-Year Engagement (2012) - Michigan Rabbi
- War Dogs (2016) - Rock Island Bureaucrat
- Blood Type (2018) - Paul
