= Dee Caruso =

American screenwriter

Dee Caruso (April 7, 1929 – May 27, 2012) was an American television and film screenwriter and television producer, whose credits included Get Smart, The Monkees and The Smothers Brothers Show. Caruso and his longtime writing partner, Gerald Gardner, frequently collaborated on projects. The writing duo were the head writers for the 1960s television comedy series, Get Smart.

== Career ==
Caruso began his career by writing for comedians at nightclubs, including Don Adams and Allen & Rossi, the comedy team of Marty Allen and Steve Rossi.

Caruso and writing partner, Gerald Gardner, were head writers for Get Smart. They duo continued to collaborate on projects throughout their career. Caruso and Gardner wrote 22 episodes of The Monkees, which aired from 1966 to 1968. In 1965, Caruso and Gardner were part of the writing staff which won an Emmy for their work on David Frost's That Was the Week That Was. They co-produced The Red Skelton Show. Together, they wrote other episodes of The Smothers Brothers Show, What's Happening!!, The Ghost & Mrs. Muir, Happy Days and The Bill Cosby Show. Caruso and Gardner co-wrote a 1966 episode of Gilligan's Island, "The Producer," which guest starred Phil Silvers and featured a musical version of Hamlet, and which was selected by TV Guide as one of the 100 greatest television episodes of all time. Caruso and Gardner co-wrote television specials for Jerry Lewis, Bill Cosby, Robin Williams, Debbie Reynolds, Don Rickles and Jack Benny. Additionally, the pair wrote several television films, including Break Up, which starred Bernadette Peters in 1973; and How to Break Up a Happy Divorce, a 1976 NBC television movie starring Barbara Eden, which the duo also produced.

Dee Caruso and Gardner also worked on several feature film projects. They co-wrote Which Way to the Front?, a 1970 satirical war flick starring Jerry Lewis; The World's Greatest Athlete, a 1973 Walt Disney production starring John Amos and Jan-Michael Vincent; and Doin' Time, a 1985 Warner Brothers film.

Caruso and his wife, Sandra Caruso, co-taught a class, called "What's Funny, What's Not," for ten years at the UCLA Extension Writers' Program. Caruso then became a screenwriting professor at the UCLA School of Theater, Film and Television, where he taught for more than twenty years.

Dee Caruso died of pneumonia at his home in Brentwood, Los Angeles, on May 27, 2012, at the age of 83. He was survived by his wife of 47 years, Sandra Caruso. His memorial service was held at the Pierce Brothers Westwood Village Memorial Park Cemetery in Los Angeles.
