= Gilligan =

TV character

- Gilligan's Island character
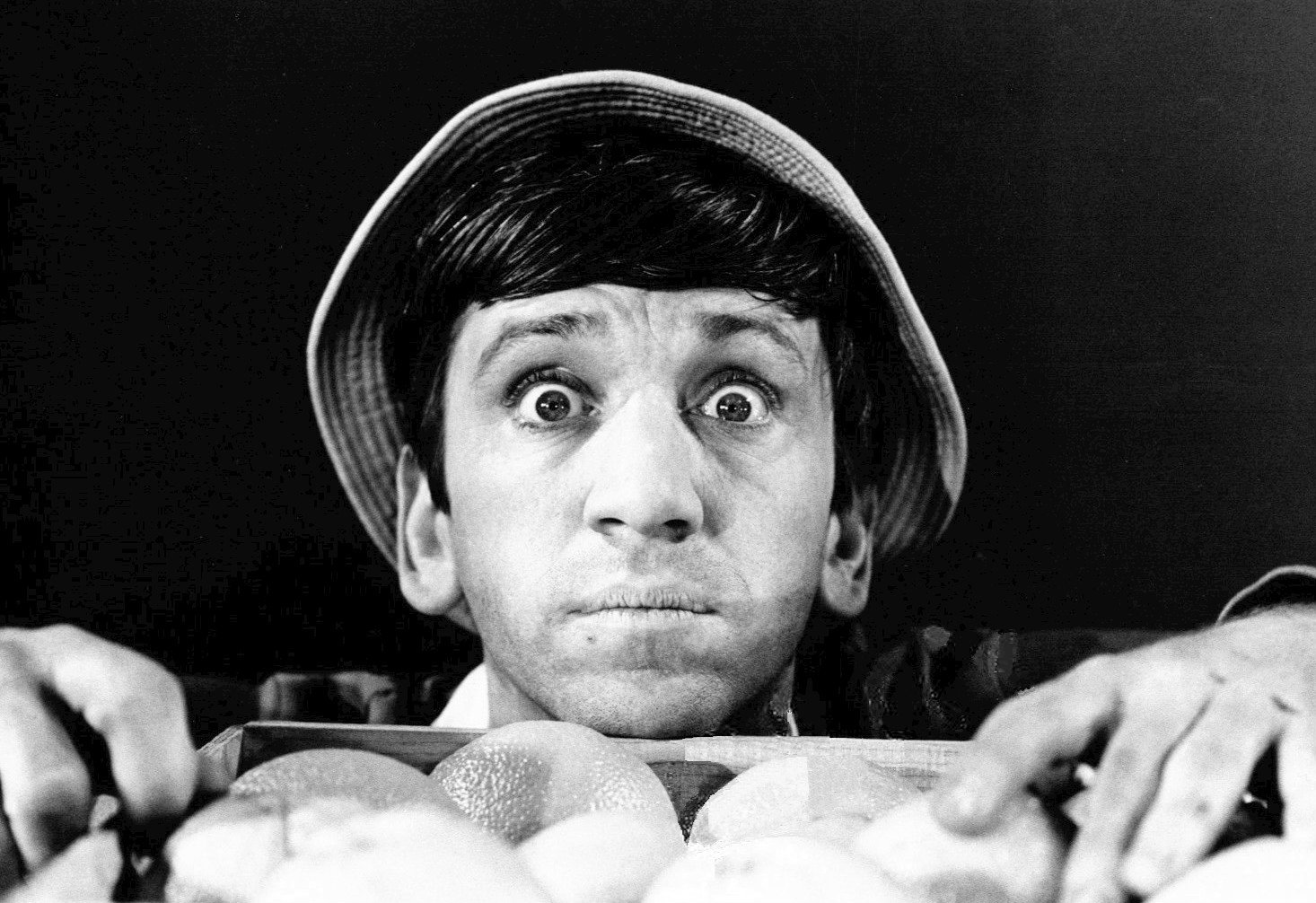
- First appearance: "Marooned"; Gilligan's Island (pilot, 1963)
- Last appearance: "Gilligan's Army"; Gilligan's Planet (1982)
- Created by: Sherwood Schwartz
- Portrayed by: Bob Denver

In-universe information
- Nickname: Little buddy
- Species: Human
- Gender: Male
- Occupation: First mate

Willy Gilligan (or simply just Gilligan) is a fictional character played by Bob Denver on the 1960s TV show Gilligan's Island and its many sequels. Gilligan, affectionately called "little buddy" by the "Skipper", is the bumbling, dimwitted, accident-prone first mate of the SS Minnow. He wears a trademark red shirt, pale trousers, white sneakers, and white navy cap.

During a storm, he throws an anchor overboard without a rope attached, which leaves the Minnow shipwrecked on an "uncharted desert isle" with its seven passengers and crew, establishing the underlying premise of the franchise. The enduring popularity of the series has made him a cultural icon.

== Background ==
Gilligan served in the United States Navy with Jonas Grumby (the Skipper) during an unspecified war (probably the Korean War) and saved him from being killed by a runaway depth charge. Upon retirement, Grumby, described as "an old salt in these waters", used his savings to buy the Minnow, and as the captain (or "Skipper" as he was nearly invariably addressed), Grumby hired his "little buddy", Gilligan, as his first mate.

Gilligan's past and family are fleetingly mentioned during the series. Such characters include: an older brother from whom he swiped his ever-present red rugby shirt, his Uncle Ramsey (who was the guide for "The Lost Battalion" in World War I), possibly a sister, his cousin Rudolph, his father (who wore glasses and a mustache and was short), his grandmother, whose advice he imparts to Ginger during the episode "Don't Bug The Mosquitoes", Aunt Sarah, who had a "sneaky disease", and an Uncle John who was apparently illiterate. He once mentions he was born in Pennsylvania, but no city is specified. He'd occasionally mention his childhood friends Fatso Flannagan and Skinny Mulligan, implying that he grew up in an Irish-American neighborhood,

== Personality ==
The character of Gilligan is noted for physical comedy, often with his friend the Skipper in the role of a comic foil. Recurring gags of the show include Gilligan's seduction by Ginger, eating Mary Ann's coconut cream pies, joking about the Skipper's weight, and inadvertently undermining any attempts and efforts of the castaways to get off the island. He often interjects discussions with pointless anecdotes about his childhood or with seemingly useless advice. Though he is often chided by the Skipper for interrupting, on more than one occasion, Gilligan's seemingly random nonsense actually triggers the Professor to remember a useful fact or suggest a course of action. In some episodes, he attempts to make an important suggestion, but is interrupted by the Skipper or another castaway, who tells him to be quiet until the discussion is practically over, when he is able to tell them. Examples of this include the episode where he discovers waterproof glue that turns out to be temporary and that the boat will sink. His warning is ignored until the point when the boat's boards come undone. When a butterfly collector comes to the island and refused to signal until he got what he came for, the castaways argue among themselves about the collector's recalcitrance and ignore Gilligan, until he gets in the last word by saying he stole the man's flare gun.

Despite his bumbling nature, Gilligan has an innate innocence of character that causes the others to forgive his mistakes. He occasionally saves the others when an escape plan goes awry. He performs virtually all manual labor on the island, mostly without complaint; the Skipper notes that Gilligan can "run as fast as a rabbit [and] climb a tree like a monkey". Gilligan often acts as the Howells' servant; duties include golf caddy, chauffeur for the castaways' pedal-powered car, and waiter at the "Howell Private Country Club".

Gilligan also makes several discoveries, but they often have disastrous results, and he is usually faced with big decisions. Often, Thurston Howell III attempts to bribe him with money, or Ginger with seduction or fake crying. Examples include to whom to give the last orange on the island, or to whom to give hot water from a hole in the ground (which the Professor later discovers to be an active volcano). On one occasion, Gilligan finds seeds that give people the ability to read minds, but when the seeds prove to have disastrous results, he gathers up the bush and all the seeds on the island and burns them.

Despite frequently ruining plans to get off the island, his fellow castaways (the Skipper included) ultimately harbor affection for him. When Gilligan is bitten by a potentially fatal insect, everyone tries to find a cure, only to get bitten themselves (the insect is later found to be harmless). Upon hearing this, Ginger and Mary Ann burst into tears and the Skipper attempts to cheer them up by having them envision everyone getting off the island. This temporarily works until Mary Ann says, "Except for Gilligan", before Ginger and she start crying again.

Gilligan is occasionally the exception to the rescue ruination, though. In the episode "The Big Gold Strike", which involves both the finding of the S.S. Minnow's life raft and repairing of it, along with the discovery of gold on the island, the Professor warns the castaways to not bring gold on the raft due to weight concerns, but every castaway brings a personal item with them to smuggle gold, with an alternate excuse as to why (including the Professor and the Skipper), causing the raft to sink in the lagoon and for them to lose both the raft and gold. After they all confess to bringing a bag of gold on the raft, they all turn and look at Gilligan, who realizes he is the only one who actually obeyed the Professor's warning, causing him to laugh and say, "That's a switch. Usually, I'm the one left holding the bag."

Ultimately, Gilligan's ineptitude ends up rescuing the castaways. In the 1978 film Rescue from Gilligan's Island the group escapes certain death when a tsunami hits the island by merging their huts into a makeshift boat. They are now off the island, but still adrift on the high seas. Gilligan lights a fire which is immediately extinguished and he is scolded by the other castaways for such a harebrained activity. A US Coast Guard helicopter notices the smoke plume and investigates, positively identifying the lost castaways from the SS Minnow and remarks that the using a fire to signal was smart thinking, else they would have remained lost at sea and unnoticed.

In the Season 2 episode "Nyet, Nyet -- Not Yet" a pair of Soviet cosmonauts encounter the castaways, and make the following observation of Gilligan's intelligence:

Cosmonaut Igor: These Americans. They think they can fool us.

Cosmonaut Ivan: Especially Gilligan. He acts too stupid to be stupid.

Igor: Must be the cleverest one of them all.

— "Nyet, Nyet -- Not Yet", 18 November 1965

== Cultural impact ==
Today, Gilligan is widely recognized as an American popular culture icon; he ranked at 122nd place in the July 2003 list of 200 Greatest Pop Culture Icons compiled by VH-1 and People magazine.

== Name ==
Gilligan's full name has been a subject of debate among fans of the series for decades. On the 2004 DVD release of season one, Gilligan's Island – The Complete First Season, a documentary called Before the Three Hour Tour shows that Sherwood Schwartz's original treatment for the series indicated that Gilligan's full name in the failed pilot was to be "Willy Gilligan", but that rendition, with other unfamiliar castaways, was canned and did not air. The documentary also reveals that Schwartz found the name "Gilligan" by flipping through a Los Angeles telephone directory. Another story was that the term "Gilligan" was once mariner's slang for an unlucky or jinxed member of a ship's crew.

Bob Denver, on various television/radio interviews (The Pat Sajak Show, KDKA radio), said that "Gil Egan" was his choice. The actor reasoned that because everyone yelled at the first mate, it ran together as "Gilligan". On the May 18, 1988, episode of the Late Show on Fox, Denver told host Ross Shafer that Sherwood Schwartz stated that if was ever stated on the show, Gilligan's first name would have been "Willy".

== Controversies ==
In 2015, the Canadian university Université de Montréal launched a defamation lawsuit against its student union for having portrayed an "insulting" comparison of the Gilligan character with the members of the board of directors.

== Appearances ==
=== Television series and films ===
- Gilligan's Island – 98 episodes (1964–1967)
- The New Adventures of Gilligan – animated, 24 episodes (1974–1975)
- Rescue from Gilligan's Island – TV movie (1978)
- The Castaways on Gilligan's Island – TV movie (1979)
- The Harlem Globetrotters on Gilligan's Island – TV movie (1981)
- Gilligan's Planet – animated, 13 episodes (1982)
- Surviving Gilligan's Island – TV movie (2001)

=== Video games ===
- The Adventures of Gilligan's Island (1990)
- Gilligan's Island (1991)

=== Other appearances ===
- The New Gidget – 1 episode: "Gilligidge Island" (1987)
- ALF – 1 episode: "Somewhere Over the Rerun" (1987)
- Back_to_the_Beach Movie (1987)
- Baywatch – 1 episode: "Sit Right Back and You'll Hear a Tale" (1992)
- Meego – 1 episode: "Mommy 'n' Meego" (1997)
