= Lovey Howell =

- Gilligan's Island character
- First appearance: "Marooned"; Gilligan's Island (pilot, 1963)
- Last appearance: "Gilligan's Army"; Gilligan's Planet (1982)
- Created by: Sherwood Schwartz
- Portrayed by: Natalie Schafer

In-universe information
- Gender: Female
- Occupation: Socialite
- Spouse: Thurston Howell III

Lovey Howell (née Wentworth), is a fictional character from the 1964 American television sitcom Gilligan's Island, she was played by Natalie Schafer. The character is a rich socialite married to millionaire businessman Thurston Howell III.

== Character summary ==
While Mr. Howell always calls her "Lovey", she is almost always otherwise referred to as "Mrs. Howell". In the pilot, a radio announcer says that "the passenger list included one of the world's wealthiest men, billionaire Thurston Howell III, and his socially prominent wife, the international hostess Lovey Howell." When Gilligan believes he has won a lottery and invites all the people into the Howells' club, The Professor greets Mr. and Mrs. Howell as "Thurston" and "Lovey". In episode 31 of season 2, "Mr. and Mrs. ??", the Howells tell Gilligan that her maiden name is Wentworth.

Not much information was revealed about her life before being marooned with her fellow castaways, but she introduced herself in episode 6 of season 2 ("Quick Before It Sinks") as "Mrs. Thurston Howell III, from New York, Palm Beach and of course, Paris, mon cher". She also mentions in episode 17 of season 2: "You've Been Disconnected" that she spoke fluent French and Italian, hinting at a classical education. In episode 9 of season 3 ("Ring Around Gilligan"), Mr. Howell mentions her having studied at Vassar, saying "Mommy warned me about you Vassar girls and your long gym classes".

During episode 4 of season 2: "Smile, You're on Mars Camera" Thurston Howell indicates that Lovey, or at least her family, had money of their own; Mr. Howell describes her as being an heiress who is "loaded". It is also revealed that Mrs. Howell's father gave them an oil company (apparently dry) in "Dustbowl, Oklahoma" as a wedding gift, which she claims he thought was a football stadium (episode 13 of season 1:"Three Million Dollars More or Less"). Two members of her family Mr. Howell cannot stand are her mother (Mr. Howell describes her as sounding like a screech owl and having fangs for teeth and claws for hands) and her brother.

Mrs. Howell claims she was a member of the Daughters of the American Revolution (episode 30 of season 2, "'V' for Vitamins"), to have been presented at the Court of St James, and to have been selected the "Queen of the Prune-Bowl Parade" (episode 30 of season 3, "Gilligan, the Goddess"). A favorite movie star of hers is silent movie star Mary Pickford ("Castaways Pictures Presents").

Although spoiled and preoccupied with social status, Mrs. Howell was also kind and genuinely cared about the well-being of her fellow castaways. She frequently served as something of a mother figure to the two younger female castaways, Ginger Grant and Mary Ann Summers, offering advice (though she sometimes also displays jealousy toward the two younger women). One of the Island "visitors" she can't stand is socialite Erika-Tiffany Smith (played by Zsa Zsa Gabor) because her name appears before the Howells in the "Social Register". She also claims to be close friends with "Grace and Prince Rainier" on several episodes.

Several times she acted as a motherly figure to Gilligan, such as psychoanalyzing him, adopting him, and praising him for his accomplishments when no one else did. She plotted with her husband several times to steal/access/manipulate things from the other survivors. She once tried to get Gilligan and Mary Ann to wed, kept a gold mine secret from the rest of the group, divulged secrets about stolen jewelry from a parrot, schemed to convince a burnt-out artist to leave the island, and got through to an uncivilized jungle boy played by Kurt Russell. Although she gives the impression of being physically frail, in one episode ("The Big Gold Strike") she actually resorts to physical menial labor in order to extract gold from a mine; in another ("Ring Around Gilligan"), under the influence of Mad Dr. Balinkoff's ring, she executes a judo flip on her husband. She adores dogs but is allergic to cats.

It was said by Thurston Howell that their brilliance together was exceeded only by their greed. They had a house in each state and numerous servants, including an upstairs maid, a downstairs maid and a butler who served Thurston breakfast in bed. Thurston once said that in their experience a neighborhood of households worth only a million dollars each was considered a slum area.

Although the Howells were portrayed as childless in the original series, their son Thurston Howell IV (portrayed by David Ruprecht) was introduced in the reunion movie The Harlem Globetrotters on Gilligan's Island.
