= The Skipper =

"Skipper" Jonas Grumby
- Gilligan's Island character
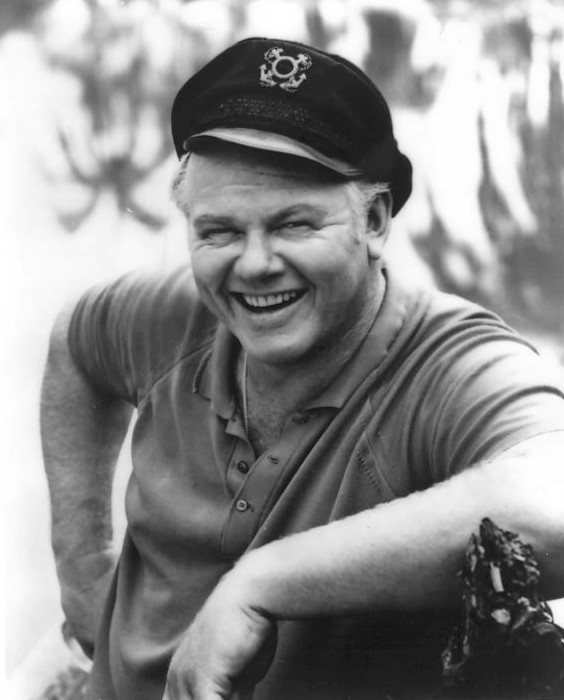
- Skipper in 1966
- First appearance: "Marooned"; Gilligan's Island (pilot, 1963)
- Last appearance: "Gilligan's Army"; Gilligan's Planet (1982)
- Created by: Sherwood Schwartz
- Portrayed by: Alan Hale Jr.

In-universe information
- Nicknames: The Skipper; Captain
- Gender: Male
- Title: Skipper
- Occupation: Boat captain
- Nationality: American

The Skipper is the title and nickname of Jonas Grumby, a fictional character from the 1960s situation comedy Gilligan's Island. Played by Alan Hale Jr., the Skipper (the character's actual name was rarely mentioned after the show's pilot episode) was the owner and captain of the S. S. Minnow on its "three-hour tour" from Hawaii when he, first mate Gilligan (portrayed by Bob Denver), and their tourist passengers were caught in a violent storm and stranded on a deserted island. He acts often in his legal role as the group's leader, albeit with a decidedly collegial and democratic bent; the only individual whom he routinely orders about is Gilligan. In times of crisis, the Skipper tends to defer to the more level-headed and educated passenger, Professor Roy Hinkley (portrayed by Russell Johnson). He does most of the physical work on the island or makes Gilligan do it. He is also the most superstitious castaway, sometimes putting him in conflict with the Professor's rationalism. The Skipper is usually depicted wearing a blue polo shirt and captain's hat.

The Skipper is irritated continually by the clumsiness and ineptitude of his "little buddy" Gilligan; despite that, they are good friends. A running gag is that the Skipper conks Gilligan on the head with his hat whenever Gilligan exhibits incompetence. One variation of this gag occurs when Gilligan (on rare occasion) does something right or correctly predicts an outcome. The Skipper prepares to conk Gilligan, then restrains himself due to the fact Gilligan was right. Another running gag is that whenever Gilligan is in a tree as a lookout and falls down, he usually lands on the Skipper.

== In other media ==
In the 2003 book Gilligan's Wake (ISBN 0-312-29123-X), Esquire film and television critic Tom Carson wrote a backstory that the Skipper served with John F. Kennedy of the PT-109 and McHale of McHale's Navy. John F. Kennedy was also skipper of his boat, and the 1964 Gilligan's Island would follow the 1961 pilot episode of McHale's Navy, the 1962 series, and the 1963 movie PT 109 as films about PT-sized boats that were shipwrecked with Navy sailors on board. Little was ever learned about his past, but in several episodes he mentions variously having several ships blown out from under him, and his veteran's status, implying that he had served in World War II. Two episodes indicate the Skipper was a veteran of the Battle of Guadalcanal as he relived an experience from the battle where he turned the radio into a transmitter, reliving the scenario in his sleep. In one episode he gets amnesia, and thinks he is on a covert mission behind enemy lines, mistaking the others for Japanese soldiers, including Ginger, whom he mistakenly believes to be a ventriloquist. He claims to be the CO of the 177th Infantry Regiment, which is a (fictional) U.S. Army regiment, but whether that actually happened or was just a wish-fulfilling fantasy is open to debate, for later on in the series he says that he was simply a cook. In one episode he claimed to have been a Navy Bandmaster and in another he claims to have been the best poker player in the US Navy.
