= Thurston Howell III =

- Gilligan's Island character
- First appearance: "Marooned"; Gilligan's Island (pilot, 1963)
- Last appearance: "Gilligan's Army"; Gilligan's Planet (1982)
- Created by: Sherwood Schwartz
- Portrayed by: Jim Backus

In-universe information
- Nickname: Mr. Howell
- Gender: Male
- Title: Millionaire
- Spouse: Lovey Howell

Thurston Howell III (mentioned in the opening credits as: "The Millionaire") is a character on the CBS television sitcom Gilligan's Island, which ran from 1964 to 1967, and later in syndication.

== Portrayal ==
Howell, portrayed by veteran character actor Jim Backus, took hundreds of thousands of dollars in cash and several changes of clothing with him for what was intended to be only a three-hour boat tour in Hawaii. Speaking with a Locust Valley lockjaw accent, Howell is a stereotypical member of the New England Yankee elite – a resident of Newport, Rhode Island, a graduate of Harvard University and a Republican. He is a member of the Newport Country Club, Oyster Bay Yacht Club, and the Union League Club where he has a "window seat". His wife, Lovey, portrayed by Natalie Schafer, is conscious of social strata, yet seems to be a good-hearted woman with a deep sense of noblesse oblige, allowing her to interact with the other passengers and crew, though regarding them all as her social inferiors. One of the implied humorous points of the show is that Thurston continually fails to realize that all of the Howells' money is essentially useless to them on the island. On the other hand, the other castaways apparently tolerate the fact that he refuses to do any work. One exception is when an egocentric Hollywood producer (played by Phil Silvers) "visited" the island and the Howells had to wait on him as butler and maid in order to be rescued. One of the most unusual aspects of his character is that, even though he is married, he sleeps with a teddy bear that he calls "Teddy". The Howells, as was common practice on American sitcoms of the mid-1960s, slept in twin beds. Thurston Howell III was the basis of a character in the television sitcom Dusty's Trail which was based on Gilligan's Island. Though described as a cunning, ruthless businessman, whose nickname was "The wolf of Wall Street", he is shown to have some moral scruples-when a mad scientist lures the castaways to his private island and shows Mr. Howell technology he had developed to switch peoples' bodies, he then asks for Mr. Howell's help in switching the bodies of world leaders with his personal minions to take over the world. Mr. Howell instead turns him down and tells his fellow castaways about the scientist’s intentions.

== Wealth ==
Howell was included on Forbes Magazine's 2006 list of the 15 richest fictional characters. Just how much money he had was never specified, but he was shown as owning several large corporations. In the pilot episode, when the radio announcer reads the names of the lost passengers, they refer to Mr Howell as a billionaire. Also when asked what happened to him during the Great Depression, his wife says that he was a billionaire, lost most of his money and "became just a millionaire." Among his assets were a diamond mine, a coconut plantation, a railroad, an oil well, and 40 acres (16 ha) in Colorado – which included all of downtown Denver – that he bequeathed to his fellow castaways in his will. He also owned the Hatchet-Cuckoo Oil Company in Dust Bowl, Oklahoma. He tried to shove this supposedly worthless oil company on Gilligan. When he hears that an imposter is going to sell off his companies for cash, he is so enraged that he tries to swim back to the mainland three times, intent on killing the man, only to be stopped by Gilligan, the Skipper, and wife Lovey.

== Spin-offs ==
Backus reprised his role in the three spin-off movies of the original series, although in the last one (The Harlem Globetrotters on Gilligan's Island) Backus's declining health only allowed him to make a three-minute cameo appearance at the conclusion. Although the Howells never had any children in the original series, their son Thurston Howell IV (portrayed by David Ruprecht) is introduced in the last movie. The younger Howell's mannerisms are similar to those of his father.
