= The Professor (Gilligan's Island) =

Professor Roy Hinkley
- Gilligan's Island character
- First appearance: "Marooned"; Gilligan's Island (pilot, 1963)
- Last appearance: "Gilligan's Army"; Gilligan's Planet (1982)
- Created by: Sherwood Schwartz
- Portrayed by: John Gabriel (1963); Russell Johnson (1964–1983)
- Voiced by: Russell Johnson

In-universe information
- Nickname: The Professor
- Gender: Male
- Occupation: High School Science Teacher; Scoutmaster; College professor

Roy Hinkley, referred to as the Professor, is one of the seven castaways from the television series Gilligan's Island (1964–1967); he was played by Russell Johnson. The character was originally played by John Gabriel in the pilot episode, but the network thought he looked too young to have all the degrees attributed to the Professor.

== Character summary ==
The Professor's backstory identifies him as Roy Hinkley (though his actual name is rarely mentioned during the series), a high-school science teacher who was born in Cleveland, Ohio. His principal expertise was as a botanist, whose purpose in joining the ill-fated voyage that stranded the castaways was to write a book to be titled Fun With Ferns. His main function on the show was to devise many ways for the castaways to live more comfortably on the island. Many of his inventions (including a method for recharging the batteries in the ubiquitous radio) used coconuts and bamboo, both of which were in plentiful supply. Aside from his proficiency in science, he was also adept and well-versed in law, literature, social sciences, and the arts. Besides a list of degrees from various schools (including a B.A. from USC, a B.S. from UCLA, an M.A. from SMU, and a PhD from TCU) he provides in one episode, little was ever learned about his past and nothing was ever learned about his family. In several episodes, brief remarks are made on his past: in the pilot he is described as a research scientist and "well-known scoutmaster"; in another when a big game hunter comes to the island and asks the Professor what sports he took, the answer is "chess"; after kissing Ginger for a prolonged period (during filming of a silent movie), he claims that he was able to hold his breath during the kissing because he used to be a "scuba diver"; in another, when the castaways try to recreate who killed "Randolph Blake", the Professor threatens to "...cancel his subscription to the Science Quarterly". Also, in the episode "Will the Real Mr. Howell Please Stand Up?", the Professor states that he does "...hold a Masters Degree in Psychology".

The Professor was portrayed as the most neutral and level-headed character. He usually displayed more patience with Gilligan than the other castaways, and was often called upon to settle disputes. As a result, he often served as a guide for the castaways whom the others respected because of his great store of knowledge, although the castaways rarely mentioned this. For unexplained reasons—possibly for research purposes in writing his book (although titled Fun with Ferns, ferns may not have been its sole topic)—the Professor brought a large number of books on diverse subjects such as chemistry and anthropology of the South Sea Islanders on a three-hour pleasure cruise in Hawaii. On many occasions, he conveniently pulls out a book which has exactly the facts needed to fix or explain a particular problem they are having. In several episodes, electric power for phonographs or washing machines is generated by employing someone (usually Gilligan) to manually pedal, or turn, a pulley, which the Professor has engineered. Besides his light blue shirt and khaki suit he also has a pair of pajamas and a sports coat.

A running joke about the Professor was his ability to build nearly anything from coconuts and bamboo, yet he was somehow unable to repair the damaged Minnow, construct a seaworthy raft or find other means to leave the island. This was parodied in the sitcom Roseanne.

The show's producer, Sherwood Schwartz, answered this paradox in an interview, when he said that the Professor's behavior was logical and quite typical; people often ignore the obvious solution because of their own biases and preferences. "That’s true of mankind", said Schwartz in an interview with WABC radio's Mark Simone. "They can do except what they cannot do." However, the professor did try many times to repair the Minnow using available island resources, but they ultimately proved inadequate.

Likewise, in an interview with Larry King, Bob Denver explained that the Professor simply "had no talent for boat-building." This is the more logical answer, since the island was stated to be 1000 miles from civilization, and an inexpert repair would be risky on such a long journey. Furthermore, in an early episode, "Goodbye Island", he attempts to do so with a native tree syrup, which proves a disastrous failure that results in the Minnow being completely destroyed. (Also, earlier in the series, Gilligan and Skipper built a raft to sail for help; however, the island was revealed to be near a shark-filled area that made such a journey too dangerous for anything other than an actual boat.)

== In popular culture ==
In the sitcom Roseanne, one of the characters playing the Professor stated after they crashed, "This hole on the boat defies all of my advanced knowledge. To fix it would be impossible ... now if you'll excuse me, I’m going to go create explosive fillings out of sand."

In the episode "Screech's Spaghetti Sauce" of the sitcom Saved by the Bell, when the Communications Class were talking about different cable access TV Shows they should produce, Screech mentioned creating a Gilligan's Island remake in the next generation and the nerd Sylvester asked if he could be the Professor.

In the parody movie Back to the Beach, a character played by Bob Denver and obviously based on Gilligan mentions knowing "a guy who could build a nuclear reactor out of coconuts but couldn't fix a two-foot hole in a boat."

In "Weird Al" Yankovic’s song "Isle Thing" (a parody of Tone Lōc’s "Wild Thing"), he sings: "She said 'That guy’s a genius' / I shook my head and laughed / 'If he's so fly / then tell me why / he couldn’t build a lousy raft?'"

In the New Monkees episode "All My Martys" actor Russell Johnson makes a guest appearance as The Professor to help the Monkees.

The end of the movie A Very Brady Sequel suggests that the Professor was the first husband of Carol Brady from The Brady Bunch (both The Brady Bunch and Gilligan's Island were creations of Sherwood Schwartz).

In an episode of the sitcom Friends, Joey buys a boat and starts wearing a boat captain's blazer and cap all the time. When Chandler enters the apartment and Joey asks him where he has been, Chandler looks at Joey's outfit and says that he was making a coconut phone with the Professor.
