= List of World War II television series =

Below is an incomplete list of fictional television series which feature events of World War II in the narrative.

== 1950s ==
Year	Year	Country	Main title (Alternative titles)	Original title (Original script)	Battles, campaigns, events depicted
1955	1958	United States	Navy Log		
1956	1957	United States	Combat Sergeant		Drama-action. North African campaign US Army espionage group
1957	1957	United Kingdom	Escape		Drama. Allied soldiers attempting POW camp escapes; six episodes
1957	1958	United Kingdom	O.S.S.		OSS in occupied France
1957	1958	United States	The Silent Service		Drama. USN submarine service

== 1960s ==
Year	Year	Country	Main title (Alternative titles)	Original title (Original script)	Battles, campaigns, events depicted
1960	1960	East Germany	Toter Winkel Blind Spot (TV)		Drama. German farm girl at odds with forced-labor camp, guards guilty of war crimes on verge of Soviet occupation period after war during 1945 directed by Wolfgang Luderer
1961	1963	United States	Alcoa Premiere "Seven Against the Sea" (1962 episode)		Drama. US PT Boat island base decimated by Japanese forces in Pacific Campaign; pilot episode for comedy McHale's Navy
1962	1963	United States	The Gallant Men		Drama. US Fifth Army company in Italian Campaign
1962	1966	United States	McHale's Navy		Comedy. Misadventures of misfit PT Boat crew in Pacific Campaign and (later) Italian Campaign
1962	1967	United States	Combat!		Drama. Frontline American infantry squad battling across France
1963	1963	United Kingdom	Moonstrike		The series was an anthology programme: a collection of self-contained stories about acts of resistance in occupied Europe during the Second World War.
1964	1965	United States	Broadside		Comedy. WAVES (navy women) transferred to South Pacific Theatre to run motorpool on island; spinoff from McHale's Navy
1964	1967	United States	Gilligan's Island "So Sorry, My Island Now" (1965 episode)		Comedy. Island is captured by Japanese sailor
1964	1967	United States	"Mine Hero" (1965 episode)		Comedy. Wartime sea mine in lagoon
1964	1967	United States	"Forward March" (1966 episode)		Comedy. Gorilla armed with wartime grenades
1964	1967	United States	Twelve O'Clock High		Drama. Missions of USAAF Bomber Group stationed on English air base and equipped with B-17s; based on 1949 film Twelve O'Clock High
1965	1965	United States	Convoy		Drama. Supply convoys and German U-boats in Atlantic Theatre that focused on an American destroyer escort and lead convoy freighter
1965	1965	Poland	The Underground Front	Podziemny front	Polish resistance, 1941–45
1965	1966	United States	Mister Roberts		Comedy. US Navy cargo ship in South Pacific; based on 1955 film Mister Roberts
1965	1966	United States	The Wackiest Ship in the Army		Comedy. Spy scow/schooner based in the South Pacific Theatre; spinoff of film The Wackiest Ship in the Army
1965	1971	United States	Hogan's Heroes		Comedy. Allied prisoners in German Stalag
1966	1966	United States	Blue Light		Drama.
1966	1966	United Kingdom	Court Martial		Drama. Judge Advocate General's office investigating crime during war
1966	1967	United States	Jericho		Drama. Espionage
1966	1968	United States	The Rat Patrol		Long Range Desert Patrol
1966	1970	Poland	Four Tank Men and a Dog	Czterej pancerni i pies	Tank crew, their dog, and their T-34 tank in 1st Polish Army on Eastern Front, 1943–45
1967	1968	United States	Garrison's Gorillas		Adventure-drama. Allied convicts recruited as commandos behind Nazi lines with offer of a post-war parole and inspired by The Dirty Dozen film; 26 episodes
1967	1968	Poland	More Than Life at Stake	Stawka większa niż życie	Kapitan Hans Kloss, Poland and Germany, 1941–45
1968	1977	United Kingdom	Dad's Army		Comedy. English Home Guard
1969	1969	United Kingdom	Manhunt		

== 1970s ==
Year	Year	Country	Main title (Alternative titles)	Original title (Original script)	Battles, campaigns, events depicted
1970	1970	East Germany	Jeder stirbt für sich allein		
1970	1972	United Kingdom	A Family at War		
1971	1973	Australia	Spyforce		Action/drama. Australian series about the fictional Special Intelligence Unit (based on the real Services Reconnaissance Department)
1971	1971	East Germany	Rottenknechte		
1971	1974	Greece	Unknown Warfare	O Agnostos Polemos (Άγνωστος Πόλεμος)	Drama. The adventures of a colonel of the counter-espionage service of Greece during the war. (226 episodes; remade in 1987)
1972	1973	United Kingdom	Pathfinders		RAF pathfinding missions
1972	1974	United Kingdom	Colditz		Colditz Castle POW camp
1973	1973	Soviet Union	Seventeen Moments of Spring	Semnadtsat mgnoveniy vesny (Семнадцать мгновений весны)	Soviet spy operating in Nazi Germany
1973	1974	United States	Roll Out		Comedy-drama. Quartermaster Trucking Company of US Third Army's "Red Ball Express" in France
1974	1974	Czechoslovakia	Once upon a time there was a house	Byl jednou jeden dům	The fate of the inhabitants of a house before and during WWII.
1974	1974	Yugoslavia	Otpisani		
1974	1975	Canada	Witness to Yesterday		Drama (talk show format). Broadcaster Patrick Watson aggressively "interviews" historical figures, including Norman Bethune († 1939)
1974	1981	United Kingdom	It Ain't Half Hot Mum		Comedy.
1975	1977	United States	Wonder Woman		Action/Drama/Sci-fi. Fictional stories of Wonder Woman battling Nazis.
1975	1975	Poland; Hungary	Third Border	Trzecia granica (in Polish)	Polish Resistance in Poland, Tatra Mountains, Slovakia, Hungary
1975	1975	Yugoslavia	The Farm in the Small Marsh		
1976	1976	Iran	My Uncle Napoleon	دایی‌جان ناپلئون	Comedy. Tehran under Allied occupation
1976	1977	United Kingdom	Yanks Go Home		Comedy.
1976	1978	United States	Baa Baa Black Sheep		Gregory 'Pappy' Boyington and Marine Air Squadron during Pacific War
1976	1983	Australia	The Sullivans		Drama. The effects World War II has on the lives of an average middle-class Melbourne family
1977	1978	United Kingdom	Backs to the Land		Comedy. Land Girls
1977	1979	United States	Operation Petticoat (Life in the Pink)		Comedy. USS Sea Tiger, pink submarine in South West Pacific Theatre; spinoff of film Operation Petticoat
1977	1979	United Kingdom; Belgium	Secret Army		Drama. Belgian Resistance; followed by 1981 series Kessler
1978	1981	Denmark	Matador	Matador	Fictional Danish town of Korsbæk, 1929–1947
1978	1978	United States	Pearl		
1978	1978	Yugoslavia	Povratak otpisanih		
1978	1978	United States	Holocaust		
1979	1979	United Kingdom	Danger UXB		British/PBS Drama centering on a Royal Engineers high explosives disposal unit operating in London defusing un-exploded bombs during the Blitz.
1979	1979	United States	Ike		

== 1980s ==
Year	Year	Country	Main title (Alternative titles)	Original title (Original script)	Battles, campaigns, events depicted
1980	1980	United States	Goodtime Girls		Comedy. Women's war effort on the homefront (Washington, D.C.)
1980	1980	East Germany	Archiv des Todes		
1981	1981	United Kingdom	Kessler		Drama. Former SS Sturmbannführer living under alias of industrialist to avoid discovery as war criminal; sequel to 1977–79 series Secret Army
1981	1981	United Kingdom	Private Schulz		
1981	1984	United Kingdom; Australia	Tenko		Women interned after the Battle of Singapore
1981	1981	Australia	A Town Like Alice		
1982	1992	United Kingdom	'Allo 'Allo!		Comedy. Café in Occupied France, French Resistance, Communist Resistance, RAF, Stalag, Italian expeditionary forces, art heists, 1940–1944
1982	1992	United Kingdom	We'll Meet Again		
1983	1983	United States	Casablanca		Based on film Casablanca
1983	1983	United States	The Winds of War		Events that lead to WWII up to Pearl Harbor from the perspective of two families
1983	1983	United Kingdom	The Fourth Arm		
1984	1984	Australia	The Last Bastion		Mini-series about Australia's relationship with its allies during World War II
1984	1984	East Germany	Front ohne Gnade		
1984	1984	Ireland	Caught in a Free State		
1984	1984	United Kingdom	The Jewel in the Crown		The last days of the British Raj during and after WWII in India. Based on the four novels by Paul Scott known collectively as "The Raj Quartet."
1984	1984	United Kingdom	Strangers and Brothers		Drama based of the novel series of the same name by C. P. Snow.
1985	1985	Australia	The Cowra Breakout		Semi-fictional mini-series about the Cowra breakout, August 1944
1985	1985	Italy	Mussolini: The Untold Story		
1985	1985	Sweden	Rød snø		
1985	1985	Australia	The Dunera Boys		Mini-series based on the Dunera incident, 1940-1941
1985	1985	United States	Jenny's War		Woman launches rescue of RAF pilot son downed over Germany, 1941
1985	1985	Czechoslovakia	Vlak dětsví a naděje	The Train of Childhood and Expectation	The story of a family from the Czechoslovak borderlands in the pre-war period and during the Second World War.
1987	1987	United Kingdom	The Diary of Anne Frank		
1987	1987	United Kingdom	Fortunes of War		
1987	1987	Australia	Nancy Wake		Drama. Mini-series about the exploits of New Zealand born SOE Operative and French Resistance member Nancy Wake
1988	1988	United States; Yugoslavia	Dirty Dozen: The Series		Allied prisoners trained for "do or die" missions; spinoff of The Dirty Dozen
1988	1988	United Kingdom	Piece of Cake		RAF from Phoney War through Battle of Britain
1988	1989	United States	War and Remembrance		Continues the story of The Winds of War starting on 15 December 1941 and ending on 7 August 1945
1988	1991	Poland	The Burning Border	Pogranicze w ogniu	Action-drama. German and Polish counter-espionage from 1918 to 1939
1988	1990	United Kingdom	Wish Me Luck		Drama-espionage. SOE women in German-occupied France
1989	1989	Australia	Tanamera – Lion of Singapore		Drama based on novel.
1989	1989	Australia; United Kingdom	The Heroes		Mini-series about the Allied commando raid on Singapore Harbour during Operation Jaywick

== 1990s ==
Year	Year	Country	Main title (Alternative titles)	Original title (Original script)	Battles, campaigns, events depicted
1990	1990	Soviet Union	The cry of a quail	Плач перепёлки	War.
1991	1991	United Kingdom; Australia	Heroes II: The Return		Sequel to The Heroes about a second commando raid on Singapore Harbour during Operation Rimau
1992	1992	Denmark	Blackout	Mørklægning	Thriller. German occupation of Denmark and Danish war-tired and ill
1993	1993	United Kingdom	Demob		Comedy-drama. Two demobilized soldiers
1994	1994	Czech Republic; United Kingdom; France; Italy; Russia	Life and Extraordinary Adventures of Private Ivan Chonkin	Žvot a neobyčejná dobrodružství vojáka Ivana Čonkina	Comedy, Romance, War.
1994	1994	United Kingdom	Seaforth		Drama. British homefront conman
1994	1994	United Kingdom	Which Way to the War		Comedy. British and Australian Desert Rats and Italian nurses in North Africa; pilot episode only
1996	1996	United Kingdom	Over Here		
1997	1997	Singapore	The Price of Peace	Hépíng de dàijià (和平的代價)	Japanese occupation of Singapore
1998	1998	United Kingdom	Coming Home (TV serial)		Drama. Wartime experiences of Judith, a schoolgirl and young woman.
1998	1998	Czech Republic	Three Kings	Tři králové	Drama. Resistance efforts in German occupation of Czechoslovakia; seven episodes
1999	1999	Germany	Riding the Storm	Sturmzeit	
1999	1999	Germany	Klemperer – Ein Leben in Deutschland		Drama based on Charlotte Link trilogy. East Prussian home front through both World Wars

== 2000s ==
Year	Year	Country	Main title (Alternative titles)	Original title (Original script)	Battles, campaigns, events depicted
2000	2000	United Kingdom	Monsignor Renard		
2001	2001	United States	Anne Frank: The Whole Story		
2001	2001	United States	Band of Brothers		Action-drama. Non-fictional account of "Easy" Company (506th Parachute Infantry Regiment, U.S. 101st Airborne Division) from training to war's end, based on Stephen E. Ambrose book
2001	2001	Australia	Changi		Changi POW camp
2001	2001	Singapore	In Pursuit of Peace	Hérì Jūn Zàilái (何日军再来)	Japanese occupation of Singapore
2001	2001	Singapore	A War Diary	Zhànzhēng rìjì (战争日记)	Romance/Drama. Chinese family during Battle of Singapore and Japanese occupation of Singapore
2001	2001	United Kingdom	The Cazalets		
2001	2002	United Kingdom	The 1940s House		
2002	2015	United Kingdom	Foyle's War		Mystery. English police solving crime amid war in Southern England
2003	2003	United Kingdom	P.O.W.		Drama. German Stalag Luft and follows RAF crewman captured after Normandy bombing raid, 1940
2004	2004	Russia	Do Not Forget	Не забывай	Drama, Romance, War.
2004	2004	Russia	Convoy PQ-17	Конвой PQ-17	Action, Adventure, Drama, History, War.
2004	2004	Russia	Moscow Saga	Московская сага	Drama.
2004	2004	Russia	Red Orchestra	Красная капелла	War. Red Orchestra
2004	2004	Russia	The Penal Battalion	Штрафбат	Action, Drama, Romance, War. Shtrafbat
2004	2004	United Kingdom	Island at War		
2004	2004	Vietnam	A Candle in the Imperial Palace	Ngọn Nến Hoàng Cung	Bảo Đại's point of view during the Japanese coup d'état in French Indochina to 1954.
2004	2005	Russia	The Cadets	Kursanty (Курсанты)	
2005	2005	Russia	Echelon	Эшелон	War.
2005	2005	Russia; China	The Dawns Here Are Quiet	А зори здесь тихие 这里的黎明静悄悄	Drama, War.
2005	2005	Russia	Man of War	Человек войны	War.
2005	2005	United Kingdom	Colditz		
2005	2005	United Kingdom	Churchill's Bodyguard		
2005	2006	China	Liang Jian	Liang Jian (亮剑)	Campaigns of 18th Army Group and Chinese People's Liberation Army from Sino-Japanese War to Chinese Civil War
2006	2006	Russia	Alka	Алька	Drama.
2006	2006	Russia	Main caliber	Главный калибр	
2006	2006	Russia; Belarus	The Last Armoured Train	Последний бронепоезд Апошні бронецягнік	Action, History, War.
2006	2006	Vietnam	Under The Flag of Great Cause	Dưới Cờ Đại Nghĩa	From episode 38 to 46, set during the Japanese occupation of Indochina
2006	2006	Canada	Above and Beyond		
2007	2007	Russia	About you	О тебе	
2007	2007	Russia	Stronger than fire	Сильнее огня	Action, Drama, War.
2007	2007	Russia	Spies Must Die!	Смерть шпионам!	Action, War. SMERSH
2007	2007	Russia	The Saboteur 2: The End of the War	Диверсант 2: Конец войны	History, War.
2007	2007	Poland	Fortress of Codes	Tajemnica twierdzy szyfrów	Thriller. Polish and German espionage, 1945
2007	2007	Denmark	Nazitübbies	Nazitübbies	Parody. Nazi Teletubbies
2007	2007	Hong Kong	War and Destiny	Leun sai gai yan (亂世佳人) (in Yue Chinese)	Nanjing Massacre
2007	2007	Iran; Hungary; France; Lebanon	Zero Degree Turn	Madār-e sefr darajeh (مدار صفر درجه) (in Persian)	Drama based on Abdol Hossein Sardari. Iranian student in occupied Paris in love with French-Jewish woman
2008	2008	Russia	Airborne Batya	Десантный Батя	Vasily Margelov
2008	2008	Russia	Heavy sand	Тяжёлый песок	Drama.
2008	2008	Russia	I'll come back	Я вернусь	
2008	2008	Russia	Save our souls	Спасите наши души	
2008	2008	Russia	Spies Must Die: The Crimea	Смерть шпионам: Крым	Action, War. SMERSH
2008	2008	Russia; Belarus	In June 1941	В июне 41-го	Drama, War.
2008	2008	Russia	Apostle	Apostol (Апостол)	Life and treachery for Russian teacher trained as Abwehr double agent
2008	2008	Germany	A Woman in Berlin	2 episodes	covers the period between 20 April and 22 June 1945 in Berlin during the capture and occupation of the city by the Red Army
2008	2008	Estonia	Windward Land	Tuulepealne maa	History of Estonia through two families, World War I to 1941
2008	2008	Germany	Wilhelm Gustloff	Die Gustloff	Greatest Disaster of German transport ship wreck by a Soviet submarine in the Baltic Sea on January 30, 1945.
2008	2010	Russia	May 9. Personal attitude	9 мая. Личное отношение	War.
2008	2011	Poland	Time of Honor	Czas honoru	Cichociemni (SOE agents) and Polish Resistance
2009	2009	Russia	When the snow melted	Когда растаял снег	Drama.
2009	2011	Russia	Katya: War History	Катя: Военная история	Drama, Romance, War.
2009	2009	Russia; Ukraine	1941		War.
2009	2009	Russia	Ordered to destroy! Operation "Chinese Box"	Приказано уничтожить! Операция: «Китайская шкатулка»	Adventure, Drama, History, War. SMERSH
2009	2009	Russia	The Disappeared	Исчезнувшие	War.
2009	2009	Russia	Second; Kochubey's detachment	Вторые; Отряд Кочубея	
2009	2009	Russia	Zastava Zhilina	Zastava Zhilina (Застава Жилина)	Romance drama. Set in 1941
2009	now	France	A French Village	Un village français	Occupied French village, from May 1940 –... (one month per episode)
2009	2011	United Kingdom	Land Girls		Drama. Land Girls
2009	2009	United Kingdom	The Diary of Anne Frank		
2009	?	China	My Brother Named Shun Liu	Wǒde Xiōngdì Jiào Shùn Liū (我的兄弟叫顺溜)	Chinese sniper during the Sino-Japanese War
2009	now	China	My Chief and My Regiment	Wǒde Tuánzhǎng Wǒde Tuán (我的团长我的团)	Drama. Chinese National Revolutionary Army Expeditionary Force in Burma battling Imperial Japanese Army during Battle of Yunnan-Burma Road in Sino-Japanese War, 1942

== 2010s ==
Year	Year	Country	Main title (Alternative titles)	Original title (Original script)	Battles, campaigns, events depicted
2010	2010	Russia	War Intelligence Service. Western Front	Военная разведка: Западный фронт	War.
2010	2010	Russia	Sky on Fire	Небо в огне	Drama, History.
2010	2010	United States	The Pacific		Action-drama. Marines of the 1st Marine Division in Pacific Theatre.
2010	2010	Vietnam	The Horse Gallops on the Southern Sky	Vó Ngựa Trời Nam	Vietnamese revolutionary's struggle against French and later Japanese occupation in Cochinchina.
2010	2010	Hong Kong	No Regrets (Rosy Business II)	巾幗梟雄之義海豪情	Drama. Canton, China during Japanese occupation.
2010	2010	Belarus	Attempt	Покушение	War.
2011	2011	Russia	Counterplay	Контригра	War.
2011	2011	Russia	M.U.R	М.У.Р	Crime, War.
2011	2011	Russia	My dear man	Дорогой мой человек	Drama.
2011	2011	Russia	Alien wings	Чужие крылья	Adventure.
2011	2011	Russia	Berlin-style roast hare	Заяц, жаренный по-берлински	Comedy, War.
2011	2011	Russia	War Intelligence Service 2. The First Hit	Военная разведка: Первый удар	War.
2011	2011	Russia	Enemy Wings	Чужие крылья	Adventure.
2011	2011	Belarus	German	Немец	Adventure, War.
2011	2011	Russia	People's Commissariat's convoy	Наркомовский обоз	
2011	2011	Russia; Ukraine	Ballad About the Bomber	Баллада о бомбере	War.
2011	2011	Russia	1942	1942	War. German invasion of Russia and partisans surviving in forests; continuation of 2009 film 1941
2012	2012	Russia	Life and Fate	Жизнь и судьба	Drama. Battle of Stalingrad
2012	2012	Russia	Save or destroy	Спасти или уничтожить	Yakov Dzhugashvili
2012	2012	Russia	War Intelligence Service. The Northern Front	Военная разведка: Северный фронт	War. Winter War
2012	2014	Canada	Bomb Girls		Drama. Canadian homefront and women working in Toronto munitions plant
2012	2012	United Kingdom	Restless		
2012	2012	Russia	Hunting the Gauleiter	Охота на гауляйтера	Drama, War. Wilhelm Kube, Mariya Osipova, Yelena Mazanik
2013	2013	Russia	Red Mountains	Красные горы	War.
2013	2013	Russia	Ashes	Пепел	Drama, History, War.
2013	2013	Russia	1943		
2013	2013	Russia; Belarus; Ukraine	Vasiliy Stalin	Сын отца народов	Biography, Drama, History. Vasily Stalin
2013	2013	Russia	Kill Stalin	Убить Сталина	Drama, Mystery. Brandenburgers, Battle of Moscow
2013	2013	Russia	Fighters	Истребители	Action, Drama, War.
2013	2013	Russia	Night Swallows	Ночные ласточки	Action, Drama, Romance, War. Night Witches
2013	2013	Russia	Spies	Разведчицы	Drama, War.
2013	2013	Germany	Generation War	Unsere Mütter, unsere Väter	Group of friends experience different fate during German 1941 east front campaign.
2013	2013	United Kingdom; Poland	Spies of Warsaw		A spy posing as a military attaché at the French embassy in Warsaw finds himself drawn into the outbreak of World War II.
2013	2013	Belarus	Traces of the Apostles	Следы апостолов Сляды апосталаў	
2013	2014	Russia	The Bomb	Бомба	Action, Drama, War.
2014	2014	Russia	Martha's Line	Линия Марты	Drama. Siege of Leningrad
2014	2014	Russia	Talyanka	Тальянка	Drama, Romance.
2014	2014	Russia	Goodbye boys	До свидания, мальчики	Podolsk cadets, Battle of Moscow
2014	2014	Russia	Major Sokolov's gaiters	Гетеры майора Соколова	War.
2014	2014	United Kingdom	Fleming: The Man Who Would Be Bond		Mini-series detailing the military career of James Bond creator Ian Fleming.
2014	2014	China	Battle of Changsha	战长沙	Set between 1938 and 1945, depicting Battles of Changsha during Second world war.
2015	2015	Russia	Satellites	Спутники	
2015	2015	Russia	Executioner	Палач	Mystery. Antonina Makarova
2015	2015	Russia	The Young Guard	Молодая гвардия	Drama, History, War. Young Guard
2015	2017	Canada; Hungary	X Company		Drama. Canadian, British, and American spies based out of a training facility in Canada carry out missions in Nazi-occupied Europe.
2015	2015	Norway	The Heavy Water War	Kampen om tungtvannet	Based on the operation surrounding the destruction of Nazi heavy water production facility in occupied Norway by the Norwegian Resistance.
2015	2015	Germany	Tannbach		Fictionalized story inspired by a village that was divided by the Iron Curtain along a brook known as the Tannbach, during the ending of the Second World War
2015	2015	France	Resistance	Résistance	Paris 1940, based on the Groupe du musée de l'Homme
2015	2016	Georgia	Kerch: The Lost Heroes	Kerči: Daḳarguli Gmirebi (ქერჩი - დაკარგული გმირები)	Drama. Centered around ethnic Georgians in the Red Army during Crimean Offensive and Battle of the Kerch Peninsula.
2015	2016	United Kingdom	Home Fires		Drama. Set in a rural Cheshire community called Great Paxford, about the life of Women's Institute members on the Home Front during the Second World War.
2016	2016	United Kingdom	My Mother and Other Strangers		Drama set in 1943, centering on the townspeople of the fictional village of Moybeg, Northern Ireland, as they come to terms with the influx of thousands of American servicemen.
2016	2016	United Kingdom	Close to the Enemy		
2016	2016	Japan	Tokyo Trial		
2016	Now	Russia; Ukraine	Under Military Law	По законам военного времени За законами воєнного часу	Drama, History, War.
2017	2017	Ukraine	Convoy	Конвой	
2017	2017	Russia	Commissioner	Комиссарша	Drama, War.
2017	2017	Russia	One Hundred Days of Freedom	Сто дней свободы	Drama.
2017	2017	Russia	Ancestral Land	Отчий берег	Drama.
2017	2017	Germany	Charité (TV series)		The plot takes place in 1943 at a hospital under the Nazi regime during World War II and shows how the war affected the doctors, nurses and students at Berlin's renowned learning hospital
2017	2017	United Kingdom	The Halcyon		
2017	2017	United Kingdom	SS-GB		
2018	2018	Ukraine	Someone else's life	Чужая жизнь	
2018	2018	Russia	Staying Alive	Остаться в живых	Drama. Battle of Moscow
2018	2018	Russia	Strong armor	Крепкая броня	War. Battle of Kursk
2018	2018	Germany	Das Boot		
2019	2019	Russia; Ukraine; China	Richard Sorge. Master Spy	Зорге	Biography, Drama, History, Mystery, War. Richard Sorge
2019	2019	Germany	Charité at War		It is a sequel of Charité.
2019	2019	United Kingdom	World on Fire		Drama. Mini-series that follows the hidden lives of ordinary people from Britain, Poland, France and Germany during World War II.
2019	2019	United States; Italy	Catch-22		Comedy, Drama. USAAF in the Italian campaign.
2019	2020	Ukraine	Not a step back!	Ни шагу назад!	Drama.
2019	2022	Russia	Death to Spies	СМЕРШ	Action, Drama, History, Mystery, War. SMERSH

== 2020s ==
Year	Year	Country	Main title (Alternative titles)	Original title (Original script)	Battles, campaigns, events depicted
2020	Now	Russia	Savage	Алекс Лютый	Alexander Yukhnovsky
2020	2020	Russia	Dzhulbars	Джульбарс	Drama, History, War.
2020	2020	Russia	The Black Sea	Чёрное море	Drama.
2020	Now	Russia	About People and About War	Про людей и про войну	Drama, History, War.
2020	2020	Norway	Atlantic Crossing		Drama. Evacuation of the Royal Family of Norway during World War II
2020	2020	United States	The Liberator		Italian campaign
2021	2021	Germany	The Defeated	Shadowplay	Berlin immediately after being divided into allied zones
2020	2020	India		The Forgotten Army - Azaadi Ke Liye	China Burma India Theater, Indian National Army against British Raj
2020	2020	United Kingdom	Life After Life		An English woman experiences an endless cycle of birth, death, and rebirth in the first half of the 20th century, which includes The Blitz and the destruction of Germany after Allied bombings.
2021	2021	Russia	Through the eyes of war	Глазами войны	
2021	2021	Russia	Death number	Смертельный номер	Drama, War.
2022	2022	Russia	In the Chair Park	В парке Чаир	Drama, History, War.
2022	2022	Russia	Barents Sea	Баренцево море	Mystery, War.
2022	2022	Russia	No Order to Die	Приказа умирать не было	Mystery, War.
2022	2022	United Kingdom		SAS: Rogue Heroes	Origins of the British Army Special Air Service (SAS) during World War II.
2022	2022	Russia	SMERSH. Continuation	СМЕРШ. Продолжение	Action, Drama, History, Mystery, War. SMERSH
2023	2023	Russia	Under the unkind sky	Под неласковым небом	History.
2023	2023	Russia	Big house	Большой дом	Mystery.
2023	2023	Russia	Katyusha	Катюша	Drama, Mystery, War. Anti-tank dog
2023	2023	Russia	Operation Neman	Операция «Неман»	Drama, War.
2023	2023	United States	All the Light We Cannot See		A drama about two teenagers during occupied France during World War II.
2023	2023	Russia	Call sign "Cranes"	Позывной «Журавли»	Drama, War.
2024	2024	Russia	Only Tanya is left	Осталась одна Таня	Tanya Savicheva, Siege of Leningrad
2024	2024	Russia	Admiral Kuznetsov	Адмирал Кузнецов	Biography, Drama, History, War. Nikolai Kuznetsov
2024	2024	Russia	Fighters. Battle for Crimea	Истребители. Битва за Крым	Drama, War.
2024	2024	United States	Masters of the Air		100th Bombardment Group of the Eighth Air Force
2024	2024	Philippines	Pulang Araw		Japanese occupation of the Philippines
2024	2024	United States	We Were the Lucky Ones		A Polish Jewish family separated by the Invasion of Poland
2024	2024	Italy; Australia; United Kingdom; United States	The Tattooist of Auschwitz		A Jewish prisoner in the Auschwitz-Birkenau concentration camp
2024	2024	Russia	Enemy at the gates	Враг у ворот	Drama, Mystery, Romance, War.
2025	2025	Russia	45 days until victory	45 дней до победы	
2025	2025	Russia	Atom	Атом	Drama, History. Soviet atomic bomb project
2025	2025	Russia	SMERSH 3	СМЕРШ 3	Action, Mystery, War. SMERSH
2025	2025	Russia	So, that's where we're headed	Значит, нам туда дорога	Drama, History, War.
2025	2025	Russia	Soldier's Mother	Солдатская мать	Drama, War. Epistinia Stepanova
2025	2025	Russia	Victory	Победа	Eastern Front
2025	2025	Russia	Taganrog	Таганрог	Drama, War. Taganrog resistance movement
2025	2025	Russia	On the trail of the beast	По следу зверя	Drama, Mystery, War.
2025	2025	Russia	Doctor Vera	Доктор Вера	Drama, War.
2025	2025	Russia; Kazakhstan	Alligator	Аллигатор	
2025	2025	Russia	Berlin heat	Берлинская жара	Drama, Thriller. German nuclear program during World War II, Soviet atomic bomb project

== In development ==
Year	Year	Country	Main title (Alternative titles)	Original title (Original script)	Battles, campaigns, events depicted
2025	2025	Belarus; Russia	Partisans	Партизаны	
2025	2025	Russia	Angels of Ladoga	Ангелы Ладоги	Siege of Leningrad
2025	2025	Russia	Baltic Sea	Балтийское море	
2025	2025	Russia	A soldier named Rex	Солдат по кличке Рекс	Drama, War.

== Science fiction and fantasy ==
Years		Country	Main title (Alternative titles)	Original title (Original script)	Battles, campaigns, events depicted
1959	1964	United States	The Twilight Zone "The Man in the Bottle" (1960 episode)		Fantasy. Genie turns man into Hitler at the Battle of Berlin, 1945
1959	1964	United States	"A Quality of Mercy" (1961 episode)		Fantasy. A racist American officer is turned into a Japanese man during the Philippines Campaign.
1964	1965	United States	Jonny Quest "The Devil's Tower" (1965 episode)		Animated. Nazi war criminal has slave cavemen
1964	1968	United States	Voyage to the Bottom of the Sea "Death from the Past" (1967 episode)		SF adventure. Nazis who believe the war has not ended
1966	1967	United States	The Time Tunnel "The Day The Sky Fell In" (1966 episode)		SF adventure. Time travellers at Pearl Harbor the day before
1966	1967	United States	"Invasion" (1966 episode)		SF adventure. Time travellers in Cherbourg before D-Day
1966	1969	United States	Star Trek "The City on the Edge of Forever" (1967 episode)		SF drama. Time-travelling Dr. McCoy causes Hitler to win the war
1966	1969	United States	"Patterns of Force" (1968 episode)		SF drama. Alien society modelled after Nazi Germany
1975	1976	United States	Wonder Woman (The New Original Wonder Woman / The New Adventures of Wonder Woman) (Season 1 only)		Diana Prince battles Nazi villains; Wonder Woman (TV) spinoff
1980	1980	United States	Galactica 1980 "Galactica Discovers Earth" (episode)		SF adventure. V-2 rocket programme receives future technology
1989	1989	United Kingdom	Doctor Who Season Twenty Six "The Curse of Fenric" (4 episodes)		SF adventure. The Doctor and Ace confront an ancient evil, while trying to stop the British Navy and a group of Soviet commandos from destroying each other
1993	1999	United Kingdom	Goodnight Sweetheart		Comedy-Fantasy. Time traveller living two lives, between 1940's wartime London and 1990s
1999	2004	United States	Angel "Why We Fight" (2004 episode)		Vampires encounter undead U-boat crew
1999	present	United States	Family Guy "Road to Germany" (2008 episode)		Animated SF comedy. Time-travelling Brian and Stewie in a Warsaw shul, 1 September 1939
2001	2005	United States	Star Trek: Enterprise "Storm Front (Star Trek: Enterprise)" (2004 episode)		SF adventure. Aliens from an alternate timeline join with Nazis to attempt a takeover of Earth while at the same time attempting to return to their native timeline
2004	2005	Japan	Zipang	Jipangu (ジパング)	Anime. Japan Maritime Self-Defence Force destroyer travelling through time to early days of war
2007	2020	Japan	Strike Witches	Sutoraiku Wicchīzu (ストライクウィッチーズ)	Anime. Set on an alternate Earth that being invaded by aliens call the "Neuroi", most of Witches are based on the World War II flying aces
2008	2010	Japan	Hetalia: Axis Powers	Hetaria Axis Powers (ヘタリア Axis Powers)	Anime. Characters as national personifications of wartime countries
2011	2011	United Kingdom	Doctor Who Sixth Series "Let's Kill Hitler" (episode)		SF adventure. Time travellers lock Hitler in a cupboard, 1938
2015	TBA	Japan	Kantai Collection	Kantai Korekushon -KanKore- (艦隊これくしょん -艦これ-)	Anime. Set in a world with the monsters from the deep sea called the "Abyssal Fleet", all Fleet Girls are based on the World War II warships
2016	2016	Japan	Izetta: The Last Witch	Shūmatsu no Izetta (終末のイゼッタ)	Anime. Set in an alternate Earth with a story based on World War II, featuring a witch that possesses the ability to magically manipulate any object that she touches
2018	2018	Japan	Katana Maidens: Toji No Miko	Toji no Miko (刀使ノ巫女)	Anime. Set in the modern time, however the story also focuses on a project dated from near the end of the World War II
2019	2019	Japan	Azur Lane	Azūru Rēn (アズールレーン)	Anime. Set in the world that being invaded by the mysterious creatures called the "Siren" and other nations fight each other, all ships are based on the World War II warships
2023	2024	South Korea	Gyeongseong Creature (1st season)	Gyeongseong Keulicheo (경성크리처)	Set in 1945, where Unit 731 experiments created monsters underground in Gyeongseong, when Korea was still under Japanese occupation

== See also ==
- List of World War II films
- List of World War II short films
