= Girl next door =

Archetype of a kind and unassuming woman

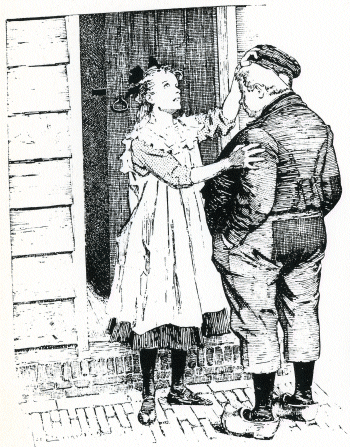
Dik Trom and the blind girl next door (by Johan Braakensiek)

The girl next door is a young female stock character who is often used in romantic stories. She is named so because she often lives next door to the protagonist or is a childhood friend. They start out with a friendship that later often develops into romantic attraction. A similar expression is "boy next door".

== Characteristics ==
A girl-next-door character is often portrayed as natural, innocent, and unpretentious. Evoking nostalgia, she is associated with small towns and local or even rural ways of life. For example, the actress and singer Doris Day, "Hollywood's girl next door", renowned for her rom-com film roles in the 1950s, pioneered the type in film. On television, the sitcom Gilligan's Island offered the character of Mary Ann Summers (portrayed by Dawn Wells), with her girl-next-door allure in contrast with the glamorous movie star character Ginger Grant (Tina Louise). The show's long popularity led to the question "Ginger or Mary Ann?," a shorthand way to ask someone whether they preferred a girl-next-door type or a glamorous type.

The love triangle is a common trope in fiction and often involves a male protagonist caught between his desire for two women, one of them the "sweet, ordinary, and caring girl next door" he grew up with, the other a more well-off or beautiful woman of lower morals. The male may pass over the latter for the girl next door, or may himself be ignored by the beautiful woman as she pursues a more desirable man.

== See also ==
- Farmer's daughter – Stereotype in fiction
- Friend zone – Inability to move from a platonic relationship into a romantic one
- Innamorati – Stock characters within the theatre style known as Commedia dell'arte
