= Veselkin =

Veselkin (Russian: Весёлкин, from весёлый meaning cheerful) is a Russian masculine surname, its feminine counterpart is Veselkina. It may refer to

- Alexei Veselkin (1961–2025), Russian actor and TV game show presenter
- Igor Veselkin (1915–1997), Russian realist painter, graphic artist and scenographer
