= Mary Ann Summers =

Fictional character in TV sitcom Gilligan's Island

- Gilligan's Island character
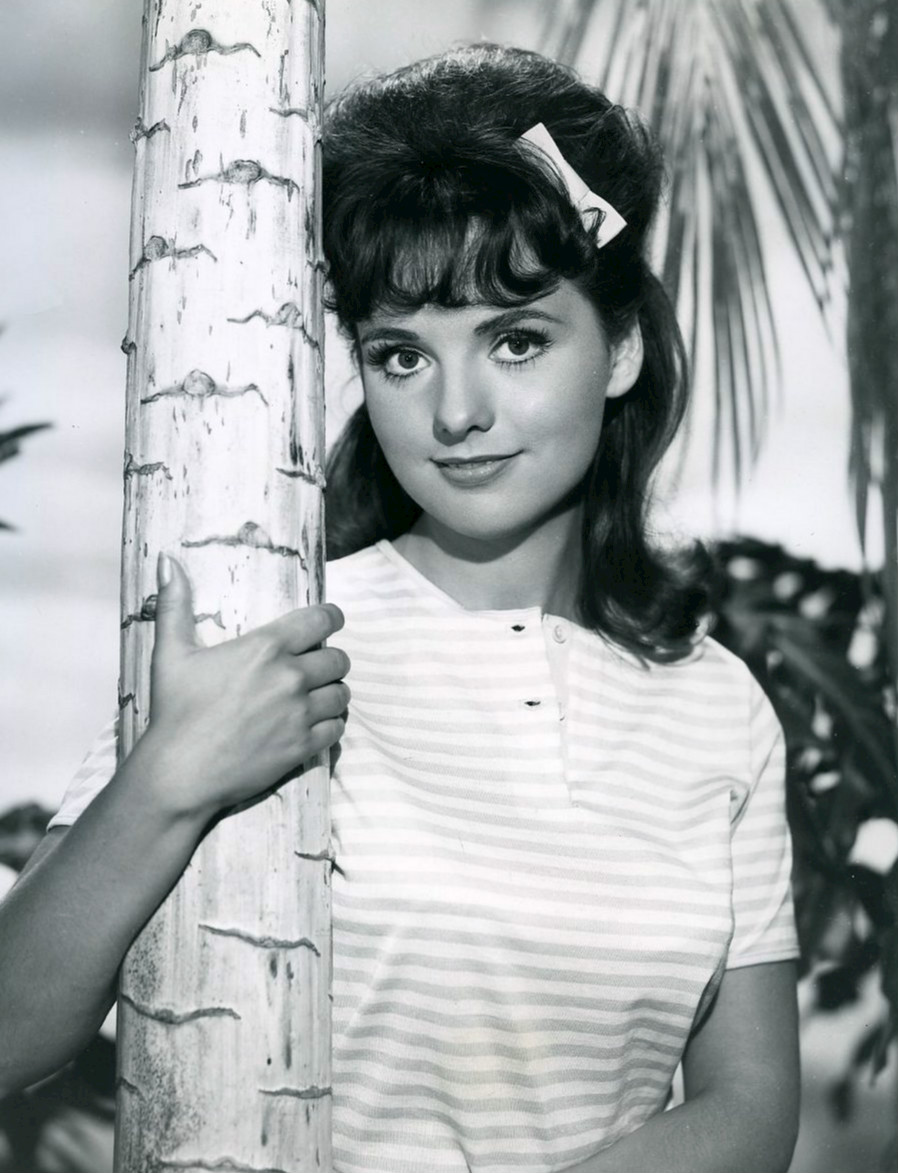
- First appearance: "Two on a Raft"; Gilligan's Island (1964)
- Last appearance: "Gilligan's Island Commercials"; Me-TV Promos (2020)
- Created by: Sherwood Schwartz
- Portrayed by: Dawn Wells

In-universe information
- Gender: Female
- Occupation: Farm girl, general store employee
- Relatives: Aunt Martha; Uncle George

Mary Ann Summers is a fictional character in the television sitcom Gilligan's Island which ran on the CBS network from 1964 to 1967, and has run more or less continuously since in reruns. She was played by actress Dawn Wells.

== Character summary ==
Mary Ann was portrayed by actress Dawn Wells. She is an ingénue, the typical girl next door, and a foil as well as a friend to glamorous Hollywood star Ginger Grant, played by Tina Louise. In addition, her practical domestic skills and plain, good, common sense make her an indispensable member of the group. She is from Winfield, Kansas, a farm girl, and a reference to Dorothy Gale as played by Judy Garland in the 1939 classic movie The Wizard of Oz (occasionally wearing Dorothy's ubiquitous pigtails and a gingham dress).

Mary Ann is in her late teens to early twenties. She was traveling alone on the "three-hour tour", which she had won in a contest. She tells the others that she has a boyfriend named Horace Higgenbotham from Horner's Corners, Kansas, so they would think she has someone special waiting for her, but confesses later that he is "a real creep" and not her boyfriend at all. In Rescue from Gilligan's Island, she is revealed to be in fact engaged and that her fiancé had waited 15 years for her, but when she was finally rescued, they no longer loved each other, and he married her best friend instead.

Mary Ann mentions her mother and father in passing and only very briefly, such as when she tells about her father going bankrupt, before the shipwreck, due to a dishonest business partner, but references her Aunt Martha and Uncle George multiple times, leading some to believe that she lived with them and that her parents may be deceased, another connection to The Wizard of Oz. However, her parents seem to be alive in Rescue from Gilligan's Island.

In "Two on a Raft", the Honolulu-based AM radio newsreader only states, "the attractive brunette" is "employed at the Winfield General Store".

Mary Ann Summers was not in the original pilot. They had Bunny, a secretary who was a cheerful but not so bright blonde, played by Nancy McCarthy. Bunny was a co-worker of Ginger Grant, a brunette played by Kit Smythe. After the pilot, both secretary characters were changed. Bunny was replaced by Mary Ann from Kansas, played by Dawn Wells. Ginger was changed from a secretary to a movie star from Hollywood, played by Tina Louise.
