= Farmer's daughter =

Stereotype in fiction

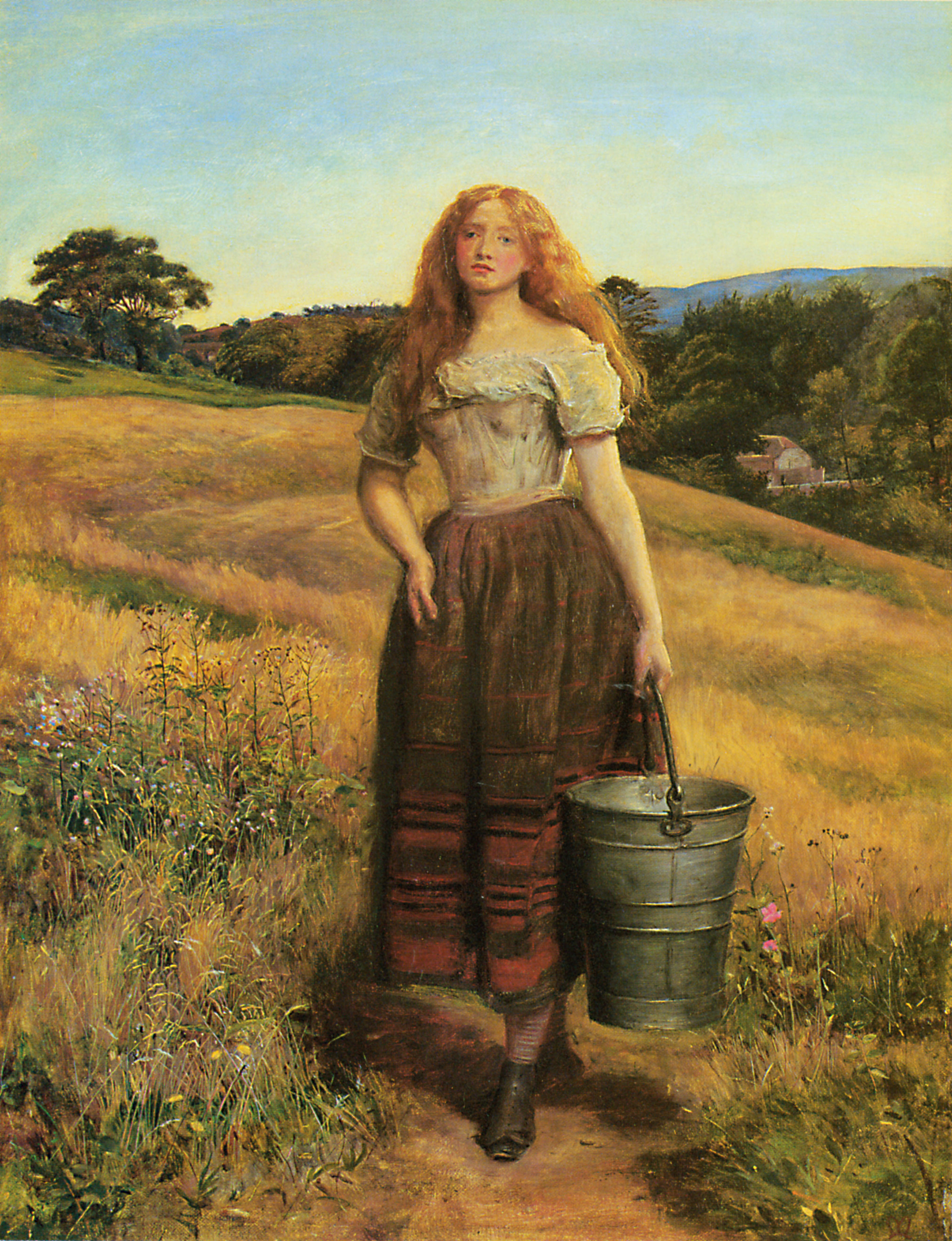
The Farmer's Daughter by John Everett Millais

The farmer's daughter or farm girl is a stock character and stereotype in fiction, often portrayed as a desirable and naïve young woman. She is described as being an "open-air type" and "public-spirited", who will tend to marry a hero and settle down.

== History ==
=== Sexual humour ===
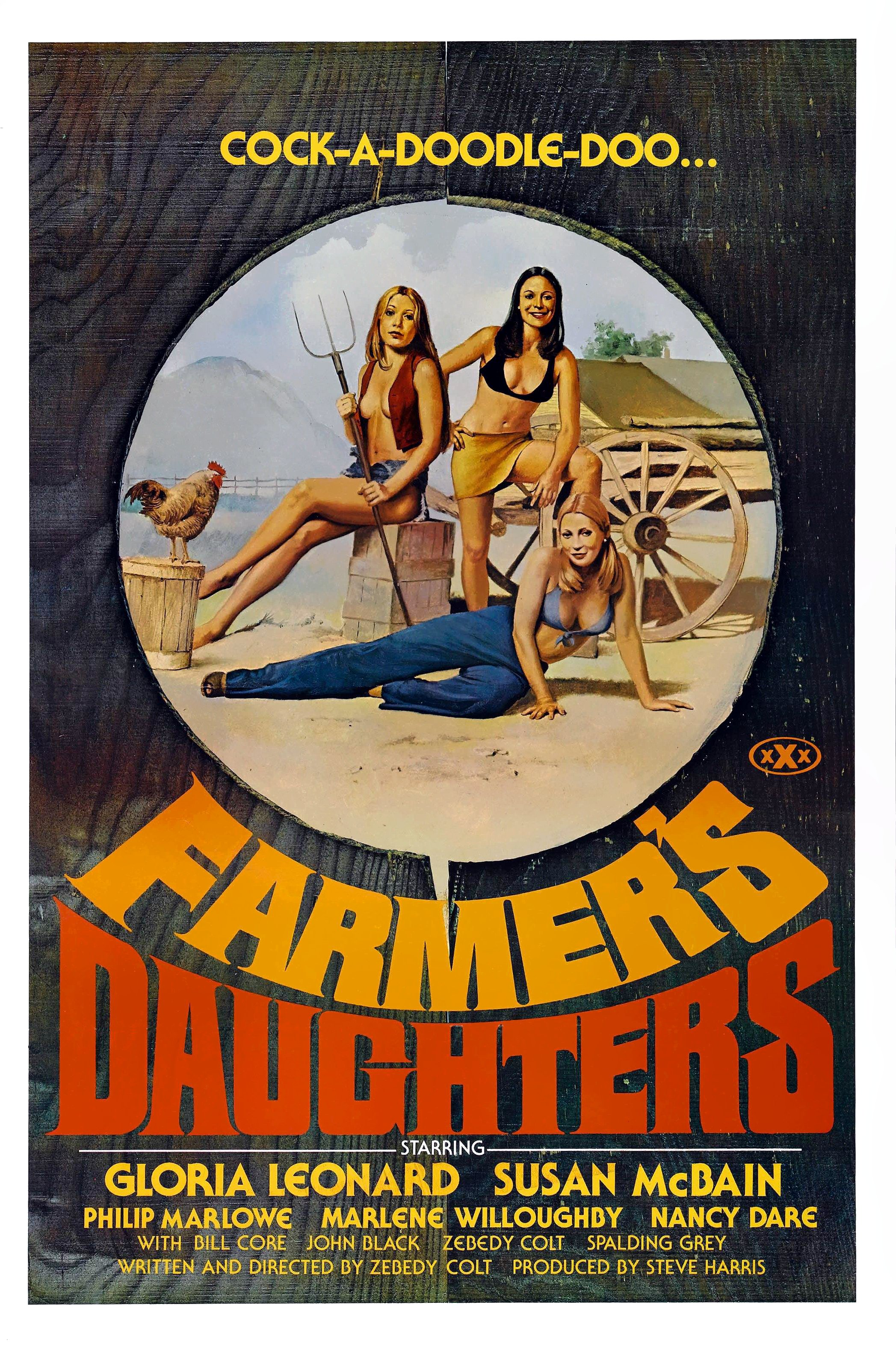
The 1976 pornographic film Farmer's Daughters plays on the term's sexual aspect

The character has historically often formed the basis for a series of jokes, known as "farmer's daughter jokes", which tend to be sexual in nature and focus on acts of promiscuity. A medieval French story describes a farmer's daughter who "Couldn't Bear to Hear About Fucking". In the story, the farmer's daughter is rendered physically ill by the very mention of vulgarisms, so she and her father's farmhand come up with euphemisms, referring to his penis as a horse and her vagina as a spring; at the end of the story, however, she instructs him to water his horse in her spring, implying that she is unwilling to speak vulgar words, but readily performs the acts.

Other variations of this types of joke characterize the farmer's daughter as an ingénue with far less knowledge about sex than the girls of her age in a city or town, (due to her upbringing being more focused on manual labor than in socialization) in this version the farmhand (or whatever other stock male character is fulfilling his role in context) takes advantage of the woman's naiveté towards her own sexual desires to get with her, often creating a misconception in the process whose unexpected consequences will be the joke's final punch line.

The plot of "farmer's daughter" jokes often involves the seduction of the daughter by another stock character, the peddler. The concept of the farmer's daughter having sex with an itinerant traveling salesman is particularly prominent in American retellings, where they are "closely associated with Ozark subculture", and where some jokes can be traced back to at least 1900.

=== Character stereotypes ===
Several stereotypes have been attached to farmer's daughters. The farmer's daughter is also characterized as being physically healthy. In a 1753 debate in the British House of Commons, the Anglo-Irish politician Robert Nugent, who was extolling the right of people to marry outside their class, stated that "a farmer's daughter is a match for the eldest son of the best lord in the land, and perhaps a better match than his father would chuse for him, because she will bring good and wholesome blood into the family".

Another characteristic is the desire of the farmer's daughter to leave the farm and discover the city and urban life. A mid-20th century American account relates that the author "heard it often stressed that a farmer's daughter is the right woman for the farmhouse. Time and time again I have heard a farmer's daughter say that she would never be a farmer's wife, yes, and at times when she's asked, she changes her mind!"

== Popular culture ==
The character of the farmer's daughter appears in several popular mainstream media productions, including the three daughters, Betty Jo, Bobbie Jo, and Billie Jo in the sitcom Petticoat Junction, Mary Ann Summers in Gilligan's Island, Daisy Duke in The Dukes of Hazzard, and Elly May Clampett in The Beverly Hillbillies, as well as Daisy Mae in the comic strip Li'l Abner. Aspects of the character type appeared in the 1947 film, The Farmer's Daughter, later adapted into a TV series of the same name, and remade in 1962.
