= Moloaʻa Bay =

Bay in Kauai County, United States of America

Coordinates: 22.19568°N 159.330415°W

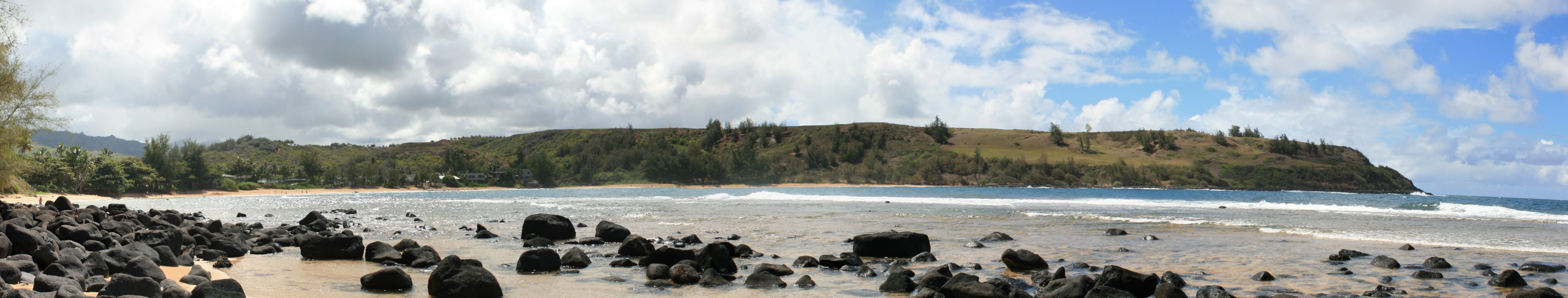
Moloaʻa Bay

Moloaʻa Bay is on the northeast shore on the island of Kauaʻi in Hawaii. The bay is 0.44 miles (710 m) long.

The name comes from molo aʻa in the Hawaiian language which means "matted roots". Paper Mulberry trees (Broussonetia papyrifera, or wauke in Hawaiian) once grew so thickly that the roots were interwoven. The Moloaʻa Stream empties into the north end of a beach which is backed by high cliffs. Uphill from the bay is the Moloaʻa State Forest Reserve.

Moloaʻa Bay had one of the highest runups in Kauaʻi during the April 1, 1946 tsunami from the 1946 Aleutian Islands earthquake. It experienced one of the highest wave amplitudes: 11.5 meters (38 ft).

Some scenes in the Gilligan's Island pilot were filmed in Moloaʻa Bay.
