= List of Gilligan's Island episodes =

Gilligan's Island is an American sitcom created and produced by Sherwood Schwartz and originally produced by United Artists Television. The series aired for three seasons on the CBS network from September 26, 1964, to April 17, 1967.

== Series overview ==
Season	Episodes	Originally released		
Season	Episodes	First released	Last released	Network
Pilot		October 16, 1992		TBS
1	36	September 26, 1964	June 12, 1965	CBS
2	32	September 16, 1965	April 28, 1966	CBS
3	30	September 12, 1966	April 17, 1967	CBS
Television films		October 14, 1978	October 14, 2001	NBC/CBS

== Episodes ==
=== Pilot (1992) ===
No.	Title	Directed by	Written by	Original release date
0	"Marooned"	Rod Amateau	Sherwood Schwartz, Austin Kalish and Elroy Schwartz	October 16, 1992 (on TBS)
Seven people find themselves marooned on a small, uninhabited island after their boat washes ashore during a storm. As in the subsequent series, the pilot episode featured Bob Denver as Gilligan, Alan Hale Jr. as The Skipper, and Jim Backus and Natalie Schafer as the Howells. The three remaining characters and actors differed from those in the series: John Gabriel played a high school teacher, while Kit Smythe and Nancy McCarthy played coworkers who were secretaries. Smythe's red-haired character was named Ginger, but was more sarcastic than the same-named movie-star character played in the series by Tina Louise. McCarthy played her character, Bunny, as a cheerful "dumb blonde" stereotype. Note: The pilot was filmed in November 1963, but was not broadcast until TBS aired it in October 1992. The departure of the Minnow was filmed on November 26, following the assassination of John F. Kennedy, and all the flags in that sequence can be seen flying at half-staff.

=== Season 1 (1964–65) ===
The first season aired Saturdays at 8:30-9:00 p.m. (EST). This is the only season to be filmed in black and white.

No. overall	No. in season	Title	Directed by	Written by	Original release date	Prod. code	U.S. households (in millions)
1	1	"Two on a Raft"	John Rich	Lawrence J. Cohen & Fred Freeman	September 26, 1964	1625–0703	11.94
2	2	"Home Sweet Hut"	Richard Donner	Bill Davenport & Charles Tannen	October 3, 1964	1625–0705	10.63
3	3	"Voodoo Something to Me"	John Rich	Austin Kalish & Elroy Schwartz	October 10, 1964	1625–0701	11.15
4	4	"Goodnight, Sweet Skipper"	Ida Lupino	Dick Conway & Roland MacLane	October 17, 1964	1625–0706	10.78
5	5	"Wrongway Feldman"	Ida Lupino	Fred Freeman & Lawrence J. Cohen	October 24, 1964	1625–0708	13.31
6	6	"President Gilligan"	Richard Donner	Roland Wolpert	October 31, 1964	1625–0707	8.15
7	7	"Sound of Quacking"	Thomas Montgomery	Lawrence J. Cohen & Fred Freeman	November 7, 1964	1625–0711	11.57
8	8	"Goodbye Island"	John Rich	Albert E. Lewin & Burt Styler	November 21, 1964	1625–0702	11.31
9	9	"The Big Gold Strike"	Stanley Z. Cherry	Roland Wolpert	November 28, 1964	1625–0713	11.68
10	10	"Waiting for Watubi"	Jack Arnold	Fred Freeman & Lawrence J. Cohen	December 5, 1964	1625–0715	11.62
11	11	"Angel on the Island"	Jack Arnold	Herbert Finn & Alan Dinehart	December 12, 1964	1625–0718	10.52
12	12	"Birds Gotta Fly, Fish Gotta Talk"	Rod Amateau	Sherwood Schwartz and Austin Kalish and Elroy Schwartz	December 19, 1964	1625–0704	11.52
13	13	"Three Million Dollars More or Less"	Thomas Montgomery	Story by : Sam Locke & Joel Rapp; Teleplay by : Bill Davenport & Charles Tannen	December 26, 1964	1625–0710	N/A
14	14	"Water, Water Everywhere"	Stanley Z. Cherry	Tom Waldman & Frank Waldman	January 2, 1965	1625–0714	14.36
15	15	"So Sorry, My Island Now"	Alan Crosland, Jr.	David P. Harmon	January 9, 1965	1625–0719	14.41
16	16	"Plant You Now, Dig You Later"	Lawrence Dobkin	Elroy Schwartz & Oliver Crawford	January 16, 1965	1625–0717	14.94
17	17	"Little Island, Big Gun"	Abner Biberman	Dick Conway & Roland MacLane	January 23, 1965	1625–0720	12.41
18	18	"'X' Marks the Spot"	Jack Arnold	Sherwood Schwartz & Elroy Schwartz	January 30, 1965	1625–0721	13.99
19	19	"Gilligan Meets Jungle Boy"	Lawrence Dobkin	Al Schwartz, Howard Merrill & Howard Harris	February 6, 1965	1625–0716	13.73
20	20	"St. Gilligan and the Dragon"	Richard Donner	Arnold & Lois Peyser	February 13, 1965	1625–0712	16.73
21	21	"Big Man on a Little Stick"	Tony Leader	Charles Tannen & Lou Huston	February 20, 1965	1625–0722	15.15
22	22	"Diamonds Are an Ape's Best Friend"	Jack Arnold	Elroy Schwartz	February 27, 1965	1625–0725	14.99
23	23	"How to Be a Hero"	Tony Leader	Herbert Finn & Alan Dinehart	March 6, 1965	1625–0724	13.57
24	24	"The Return of Wrongway Feldman"	Gene Nelson	Lawrence J. Cohen & Fred Freeman	March 13, 1965	1625–0723	13.62
25	25	"The Matchmaker"	Tony Leader	Joanna Lee	March 20, 1965	1625–0727	14.78
26	26	"Music Hath Charms"	Jack Arnold	Al Schwartz & Howard Harris	March 27, 1965	1625–0726	13.83
27	27	"New Neighbor Sam"	Thomas Montgomery	Charles Tannen & George O'Hanlon	April 3, 1965	1625–0729	15.41
28	28	"They're Off and Running"	Jack Arnold	Walter Black	April 10, 1965	1625–0728	13.52
29	29	"Three to Get Ready"	Jack Arnold	David P. Harmon	April 17, 1965	1625–0731	13.26
30	30	"Forget Me Not"	Jack Arnold	Herbert Margolis	April 24, 1965	1625–0730	N/A
31	31	"Diogenes, Won't You Please Go Home?" "Diogenes, Please Go Home"	Christian Nyby	David P. Harmon	May 1, 1965	1625–0709	N/A
32	32	"Physical Fatness"	Gary Nelson	Herbert Finn & Alan Dinehart	May 8, 1965	1625–0732	N/A
33	33	"It's Magic"	Jack Arnold	Al Schwartz & Bruce Howard	May 15, 1965	1625–0733	N/A
34	34	"Goodbye, Old Paint"	Jack Arnold	David P. Harmon	May 22, 1965	1625–0734	N/A
35	35	"My Fair Gilligan"	Tony Leader	Joanna Lee	June 5, 1965	1625–0735	N/A
36	36	"A Nose by Any Other Name"	Hal Cooper	Elroy Schwartz	June 12, 1965	1625–0736	N/A

=== Season 2 (1965–66) ===
The second season aired Thursdays at 8:00-8:30 p.m. (EST).

No. overall	No. in season	Title	Directed by	Written by	Original release date	Prod. code	U.S. households (in millions)
37	1	"Gilligan's Mother-in-Law"	Jack Arnold	Budd Grossman	September 16, 1965	1625–0752	12.37
38	2	"Beauty Is as Beauty Does"	Jack Arnold	Joanna Lee	September 23, 1965	1625–0757	11.57
39	3	"The Little Dictator"	Jack Arnold	Bob Rodgers & Sid Mandel	September 30, 1965	1625–0755	11.08
40	4	"Smile, You're on Mars Camera"	Jack Arnold	Al Schwartz & Bruce Howard	October 14, 1965	1625–0751	11.35
41	5	"The Sweepstakes"	Jack Arnold	Walter Black	October 21, 1965	1625–0758	12.32
42	6	"Quick Before It Sinks"	George Cahan	Stan Burns & Mike Marmer	October 28, 1965	1625–0760	12.32
43	7	"Castaways Pictures Presents"	Jack Arnold	Herbert Finn & Alan Dinehart	November 4, 1965	1625–0754	12.97
44	8	"Agonized Labor"	Jack Arnold	Roland MacLane	November 11, 1965	1625–0753	12.97
45	9	"Nyet, Nyet — Not Yet"	Jack Arnold	Adele T. Strassfield & Robert Riordan	November 18, 1965	1625–0763	13.83
46	10	"Hi-Fi Gilligan"	Jack Arnold	Mary C. McCall, Jr.	November 25, 1965	1625–0762	11.67
47	11	"The Chain of Command"	Leslie Goodwins	Arnold & Lois Peyser	December 2, 1965	1625–0761	12.59
48	12	"Don't Bug the Mosquitoes"	Steve Binder	Brad Radnitz	December 9, 1965	1625–0764	14.10
49	13	"Gilligan Gets Bugged"	Gary Nelson	Jack Gross, Jr. & Michael R. Stein	December 16, 1965	1625–0766	12.32
50	14	"Mine Hero"	Wilbur D'Arcy	David Braverman & Bob Marcus	December 23, 1965	1625–0759	N/A
51	15	"Erika Tiffany Smith to the Rescue"	Jack Arnold	David P. Harmon	December 30, 1965	1625–0765	13.67
52	16	"Not Guilty"	Stanley Z. Cherry	Roland MacLane	January 6, 1966	1625–0767	12.43
53	17	"You've Been Disconnected"	Jack Arnold	Elroy Schwartz	January 13, 1966	1625–0756	11.67
54	18	"The Postman Cometh"	Leslie Goodwins	Herbert Finn & Alan Dinehart	January 20, 1966	1625–0769	11.19
55	19	"Seer Gilligan"	Leslie Goodwins	Elroy Schwartz	January 27, 1966	1625–0772	11.78
56	20	"Love Me, Love My Skipper"	Tony Leader	Herbert Finn & Alan Dinehart	February 3, 1966	1625–0770	11.62
57	21	"Gilligan's Living Doll"	Leslie Goodwins	Bob Stevens	February 10, 1966	1625–0768	11.89
58	22	"Forward March"	Jerry Hopper	Jack Raymond	February 17, 1966	1625–0771	11.73
59	23	"Ship Ahoax"	Leslie Goodwins	Charles Tannen & George O'Hanlon	February 24, 1966	1625–0773	11.35
60	24	"Feed the Kitty"	Leslie Goodwins	J.E. Selby & Richard Sanville	March 3, 1966	1625–0776	12.11
61	25	"Operation: Steam Heat"	Stanley Z. Cherry	Terence & Joan Maples	March 10, 1966	1625–0777	11.67
62	26	"Will the Real Mr. Howell Please Stand Up?"	Jack Arnold	Budd Grossman	March 17, 1966	1625–0778	10.71
63	27	"Ghost a Go-Go"	Leslie Goodwins	Roland MacLane	March 24, 1966	1625–0779	11.24
64	28	"Allergy Time"	Jack Arnold	Budd Grossman	March 31, 1966	1625–0780	10.01
65	29	"The Friendly Physician"	Jack Arnold	Elroy Schwartz	April 7, 1966	1625–0775	9.31
66	30	"'V' for Vitamins"	Jack Arnold	Barney Slater	April 14, 1966	1625–0781	10.49
67	31	"Mr. and Mrs. ???"	Gary Nelson	Jack Gross, Jr. & Michael R. Stein	April 21, 1966	1625–0774	N/A
68	32	"Meet the Meteor"	Jack Arnold	Elroy Schwartz	May 5, 1966	1625–0782	N/A

=== Season 3 (1966–67) ===
The third season aired Mondays at 7:30-8:00 p.m. (EST).

No. overall	No. in season	Title	Directed by	Written by	Original release date	Prod. code	U.S. households (in millions)
69	1	"Up at Bat"	Jerry Hopper	Ron Friedman	September 12, 1966	1625–0508	8.02
70	2	"Gilligan vs. Gilligan"	Jerry Hopper	Joanna Lee	September 19, 1966	1625–0506	10.32
71	3	"Pass the Vegetables, Please"	Leslie Goodwins	Elroy Schwartz	September 26, 1966	1625–0503	9.72
72	4	"The Producer"	Ida Lupino & George M. Cahan	Gerald Gardner & Dee Caruso	October 3, 1966	1625–0512	9.94
73	5	"Voodoo"	George Cahan	Herbert Finn & Alan Dinehart	October 10, 1966	1625–0501	10.27
74	6	"Where There's a Will"	Charles Norton	Sid Mandel & Roy Kammerman	October 17, 1966	1625–0505	10.71
75	7	"Man with a Net"	Leslie Goodwins	Budd Grossman	October 24, 1966	1625–0513	8.84
76	8	"Hair Today, Gone Tomorrow"	Tony Leader	Brad Radnitz	October 31, 1966	1625–0507	8.18
77	9	"Ring Around Gilligan"	George Cahan	John Fenton Murray	November 7, 1966	1625–0509	9.06
78	10	"Topsy-Turvy"	Gary Nelson	Elroy Schwartz	November 14, 1966	1625–0511	9.83
79	11	"The Invasion"	Leslie Goodwins	Sam Locke & Joel Rapp	November 21, 1966	1625–0518	8.78
80	12	"The Kidnapper"	Jerry Hopper	Ray Singer	November 28, 1966	1625–0515	9.99
81	13	"And Then There Were None"	Jerry Hopper	Ron Friedman	December 5, 1966	1625–0517	8.78
82	14	"All About Eva"	Jerry Hopper	Joanna Lee	December 12, 1966	1625–0516	9.11
83	15	"Gilligan Goes Gung-Ho"	Robert Scheerer	Bruce Howard	December 26, 1966	1625–0510	9.06
84	16	"Take a Dare"	Stanley Z. Cherry	Roland MacLane	January 2, 1967	1625–0504	12.08
85	17	"Court-Martial"	Gary Nelson	Roland MacLane	January 9, 1967	1625–0523	11.53
86	18	"The Hunter"	Leslie Goodwins	Ben Gershman & William Freedman	January 16, 1967	1625–0519	11.42
87	19	"Lovey's Secret Admirer"	David Orrick McDearmon	Herbert Finn & Alan Dinehart	January 23, 1967	1625–0525	10.71
88	20	"Our Vines Have Tender Apes"	David Orrick McDearmon	Sid Mandel & Roy Kammerman	January 30, 1967	1625–0524	11.53
89	21	"Gilligan's Personal Magnetism"	Hal Cooper	Bruce Howard	February 6, 1967	1625–0526	11.20
90	22	"Splashdown"	Jerry Hopper	John Fenton Murray	February 20, 1967	1625–0522	10.27
91	23	"High Man on the Totem Pole"	Herbert Coleman	Brad Radnitz	February 27, 1967	1625–0520	9.44
92	24	"The Second Ginger Grant"	Steve Binder	Ron Friedman	March 6, 1967	1625–0527	9.99
93	25	"The Secret of Gilligan's Island"	Gary Nelson	Story by : Bruce Howard & Arne Sultan; Teleplay by : Bruce Howard	March 13, 1967	1625–0514	9.72
94	26	"Slave Girl"	Wilbur D'Arcy	Michael Fessier	March 20, 1967	1625–0529	11.03
95	27	"It's a Bird, It's a Plane" "It's a Bird, It's a Plane, It's Gilligan"	Gary Nelson	Sam Locke & Joel Rapp	March 27, 1967	1625–0530	10.05
96	28	"The Pigeon"	Michael Kane	Story by : Jack Raymond & Joel Hammil; Teleplay by : Brad Radnitz	April 3, 1967	1625–0521	9.83
97	29	"Bang! Bang! Bang!"	Charles Norton	Leonard Goldstein	April 10, 1967	1625–0528	9.00
98	30	"Gilligan, the Goddess"	Gary Nelson	Jack Paritz & Bob Rodgers	April 17, 1967	1625–0502	N/A

== Television films (1978–2001) ==
There were three sequel films. The first (1978) had them rescued and proved so successful that it spawned a second (1979) and third (1981). By the third film, ratings were down, and no more were made.

In 2001, Dawn Wells co-produced a television film bio-pic, where she, Bob Denver, and Russell Johnson appear as themselves as hosts and remember what life was like during the series. In the memory scenes, they and the rest of the cast are played by different actors, while Wells narrates.

Title	Original release date
Rescue from Gilligan's Island	October 14, 1978
Rescue from Gilligan's Island	October 21, 1978
The castaways turn the huts into rafts and are finally rescued, to great fanfare. On the first anniversary of their rescue they all meet in Hawaii for a reunion, and decide to take a short cruise. The weather starts to get rough, and they get stranded on the same island again. Ginger Grant was portrayed by Judith Baldwin.
The Castaways on Gilligan's Island	May 3, 1979
The castaways are once again rescued from the island, but this time they return voluntarily to build a resort on the island. Ginger Grant was portrayed by Judith Baldwin.
The Harlem Globetrotters on Gilligan's Island	May 15, 1981
The Harlem Globetrotters crashland on the island. When a millionaire tries to take over the resort, the rivalry is settled by a game between the Globetrotters and the rival's robot team. Jim Backus (Thurston Howell) had only a small walk-on part at the end of the film as he was suffering the advanced stages of Parkinson's disease. His role on the island was filled by creating "Thurston Howell IV", played by David Ruprecht, the couple's supposed son. (This conflicts with the first season episode in which Gilligan was adopted by the Howells after saving Lovey's life. He was said at that time to be their only son.) Ginger Grant was portrayed by Constance Forslund.
Surviving Gilligan's Island	October 14, 2001
A behind-the-scenes look at life as member of the Gilligan's Island cast. Dawn Wells, who was the co-executive producer, Bob Denver, and Russell Johnson reminisce about their experiences making the show. These memories come to life as the cast and crew are portrayed by actors.

== Home media ==
This series has been released on DVD by Warner Home Video, in three season box sets (the first of which includes the pilot episode) and in a complete series set. There has also been a single-disc release containing only the first two episodes.

DVD set	Episodes	Release date
Gilligan's Island: The Complete 1st Season	37	February 3, 2004
Gilligan's Island: TV Premiere DVD	2	June 8, 2004
Gilligan's Island: The Complete 2nd Season	32	January 11, 2005
Gilligan's Island: The Complete 3rd Season	30	July 26, 2005
Gilligan's Island: The Complete Series Collection	98	November 6, 2007
