= Sdelka =

- Сделка!?
- Presented by: Alexei Veselkin
- Country of origin: Russia
- No. of episodes: 70

Production
- Running time: 45 minutes (with commercials)

Original release
- Network: REN TV
- Release: April 17 – September 22, 2006

Sdelka!? (Cyrillic: Сделка!?, Russian for "deal") is the Russian version of Deal or No Deal. It was broadcast on REN TV from April 17 to September 22, 2006, and hosted by Alexei Veselkin. The prizes available ranged from 3,000,000 Russian rubles (about US$98,000, €69,000 or £61,000) to 1 kopek (smallest Russian unit of currency, less than 1 US cent, euro cent or penny).

The music used was taken from various other Deal or No Deal versions, like Miljoenenjacht (Theme), UK Deal or No Deal and Australian Deal or No Deal (various incidentals).

There are 22 cases held on a podium with 22 players that return each show like on Deal or No Deal UK, but they have briefcases rather than boxes. The show's set is similar to that of the American one, but the set is a lot smaller.

== Case values ==
Left Side	Right Side
0.01	10,000
0.10	15,000
1	25,000
5	50,000
10	100,000
50	200,000
100	300,000
500	500,000
1,000	1,000,000
2,500	1,500,000
5,000	3,000,000
