= Aleksei Veselkin =

Russian actor and television show presenter (1961–2025)

- Born: 21 November 1961
- Died: 26 March 2025 (aged 63)
- Occupations: Actor; game show presenter
- Years active: 1976–2024

Aleksei Alekseyevich Veselkin (Russian: Алексей Алексеевич Весёлкин; 21 November 1961 – 26 March 2025) was a Russian actor and television game show presenter and Honoured Artist of Russia. He was a visible personality on television and in society magazines during the 1980s and 1990s, making a popular comeback in 2006 as the host of Sdelka? (Сделка "Deal?"), the Russian version of the American gameshow Deal or No Deal. During 2012, he was also a radio host on Radio Mayak show of Sergei Stillavin, but he and co-presenter Victoria Kolosova were dismissed after government watchdog Roskomnadzor upheld complaints against a controversial article by the presenters on cystic fibrosis. Veselkin returned to his previous position as a staff actor at the Russian Academic Youth Theatre.

His son Aleksei Veselkin Jr (born in 1990) is a well-known teen actor: Veselkin Sr and Jr dubbed the voices of David Beckham and his son for the Russian version of Coca-Cola advertisements.

Veselkin died on 26 March 2025, at the age of 63.

== Filmography ==
- 1976 – Field Move
- 1983 – Romeo and Juliet
- 1984 – Faith. Hope. Love
- 1984 – It All Begins With Love
- 1984 – Two Hussars
- 1984 – Egorka
- 1985 – Road to the Sea
- 1986 – The Right People
- 1987 – Riders
- 1988 – The Actress from Gribov
- 1988 – Diskzhokey
- 1988 – The Black Corridor
- 1991 – Armavir
- 1991 – A Woman for All
- 1999 – D. D. D. Detective Dubrovsky's Dossier
- 2001 – Doctors
- 2002 – The Joys and Sorrows of Little Lord Fauntleroy
- 2002 – Looking Down
- 2003 – Poor Nastya
- 2005 – Not Born Beautiful (ru)
- 2005 – Kulagin and Partners
- 2007 – A Suitcase with a Bright Future
- 2010 – All for the Best
- 2012 – All the Afflicted
- 2014 – April Fools' Day
