= Epistinia Stepanova =

Russian woman (1882–1969)

- Portrait in 1990
- Born: Epistinia Fyodorovna Rybalko; 18 November 1882; Russian Empire
- Died: 7 February 1969 (aged 86); Rostov-on-Don, RSFSR, Soviet Union
- Spouse: Mikhail Stepanov (m. 1899; died 1934)
- Children: 15

Epistinia Fyodorovna Stepanova (Russian: Епистини́я Фёдоровна Степа́нова; November 18, 1882—February 7, 1969) was a Russian woman known for having eight sons die during World War II. She was made Cavalier of the orders Mother Heroine and the Order of the Patriotic War, I degree.

== Biography ==
Epistinia Stepanova was born on November 18, 1882, in the territory of present-day Ukraine, but from childhood she lived in the Kuban. The Stepanovs lived on the May Day farm (now the Olkhovsky farm) in the Timashyovsky District of the Krasnodar Krai. She gave birth to fifteen children. During the Russian Civil War, her son Aleksandr Sr. (1901–1918) was captured in the field, tortured and shot by Whites in retaliation for the help that the Stepanov family provided to the Red Army.

Stepanova's sons Vasily, Filipp, Fyodor, Aleksandr Jr. (posthumously awarded the title of Hero of the Soviet Union), Ivan, Ilya and Pavel died during World War II between 1939 and 1943. Her son Nikolai survived the war, but was severely wounded. He returned from hospital in August 1945, but eventually died from the long-term complications of his wounds.

In her later years, Epistinia lived in Rostov-on-Don, with the family of her only daughter, Valentina Korzhova. She died there on February 7, 1969. She was buried in the village of Dneprovskaya, Krasnodar Krai, with full military honors.
