= Nancy McCarthy =

American actress (born 1937)

Nancy McCarthy (born June 8, 1937 in Pittsburgh) is an American actress perhaps best known for her role as Bunny in the original 1963 pilot (unaired until 1992) for Gilligan's Island.

== Career ==
After the Gilligan's Island pilot was made, series creator Sherwood Schwartz, after many network problems, decided to make changes, including dropping McCarthy's character. She also appeared in two other unaired TV pilots: Zelda with Sheila James and on The Peter Lorre Playhouse.

McCarthy made appearances on eight episodes of other television series, including My Three Sons, The Donna Reed Show, The Many Loves of Dobie Gillis, Adventures in Paradise, Lock Up, and Surfside 6.

McCarthy originally made her New York stage debut as Dixie Evans in The Big Knife at the Seven Arts Playhouse in 1959, which starred Carroll O'Connor and was directed by Peter Bogdanovich. She appeared in several live television plays produced in New York, including True Story, Divorce Court, and Moment of Fear with Robert Redford on the Alfred Hitchcock Presents series. On stage in Los Angeles, she played Maggie in After the Fall.

Her regional credits include Flirt in Dark at the Top of the Stairs with Sylvia Sydney at the Cape Playhouse in Dennis, Massachusetts, and Maisie in The Boy Friend at the Pittsburgh Playhouse.

McCarthy retired from acting after suffering a back injury in 1972, but continued to work as a print and fashion model, and later, in the advertising and design field. Her final television credit is the pilot for Gilligan's Island, which finally aired on TBS on 16 October 1992, 29 years after it was filmed.

== Personal life ==
Nancy Darlyne McCarthy grew up in Pittsburgh and graduated from Carnegie Tech (now Carnegie Mellon University) with a Bachelor of Fine Arts (BFA) in drama. She began her acting career by appearing in local theater and performing on a weekly radio play. While still a student in college, she auditioned for director Otto Preminger for the title role in his movie Saint Joan.

McCarthy married twice, first to a fellow actor, and later to a businessman to whom she is still married.
