= Gilligan's Island =

American television series (1964–1967)

- Created by: Sherwood Schwartz
- Directed by: Rod Amateau; Jack Arnold; Ida Lupino; Stanley Z. Cherry; Richard Donner
- Starring: Bob Denver; Alan Hale Jr.; Jim Backus; Natalie Schafer; Tina Louise; Russell Johnson; Dawn Wells
- Theme music composer: Sherwood Schwartz; George Wyle
- Opening theme: "The Ballad of Gilligan's Isle"
- Country of origin: United States
- No. of seasons: 3
- No. of episodes: 98 plus a 1963 pilot (first broadcast in 1964) (list of episodes)

Production
- Executive producer: Sherwood Schwartz
- Producer: Sherwood Schwartz
- Camera setup: Film; single-camera
- Running time: 25 minutes
- Production companies: Gladasya Productions; CBS Productions; United Artists Television

Original release
- Network: CBS
- Release: September 26, 1964 – April 17, 1967

Related
- The New Adventures of Gilligan

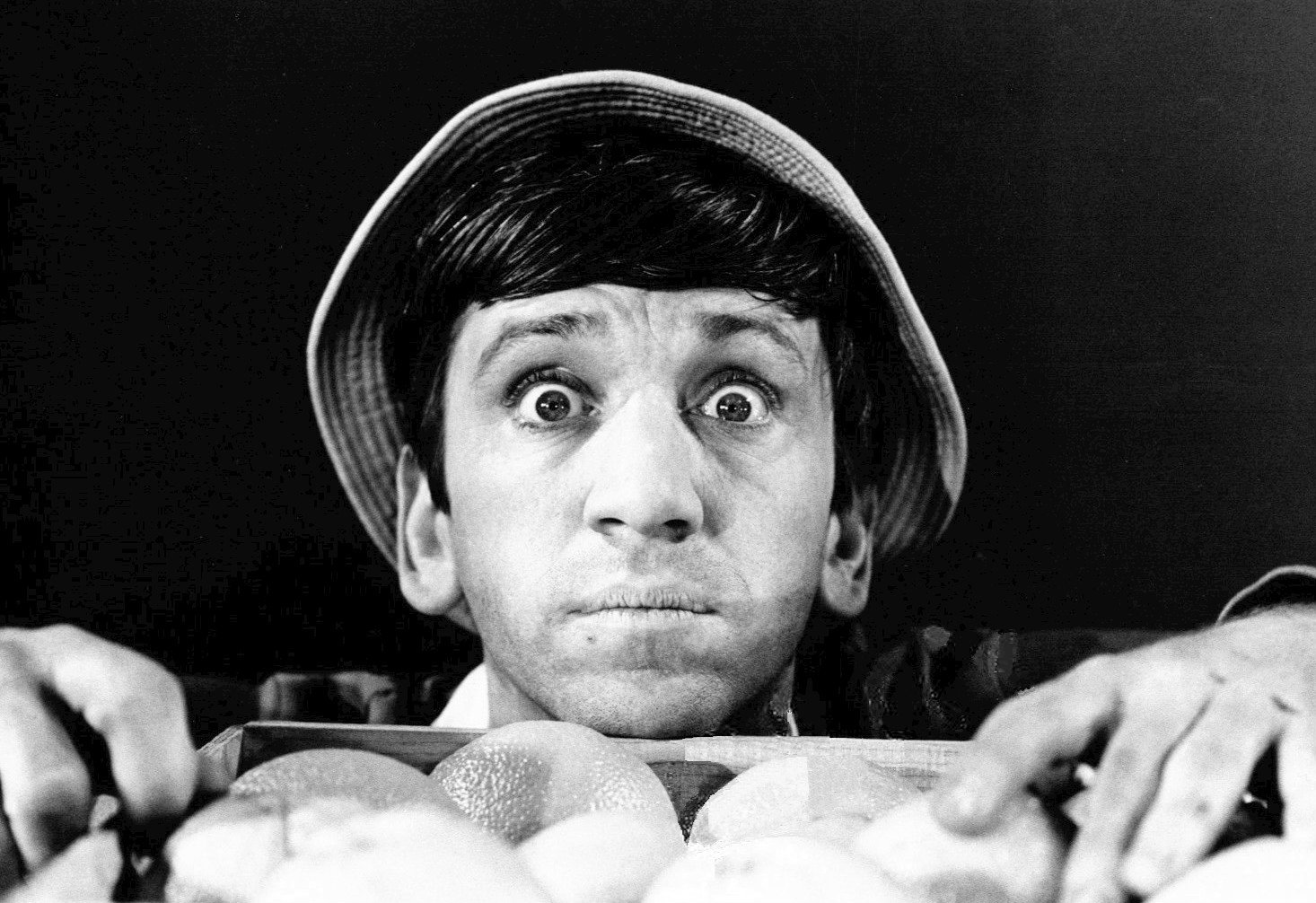
Bob Denver as Gilligan

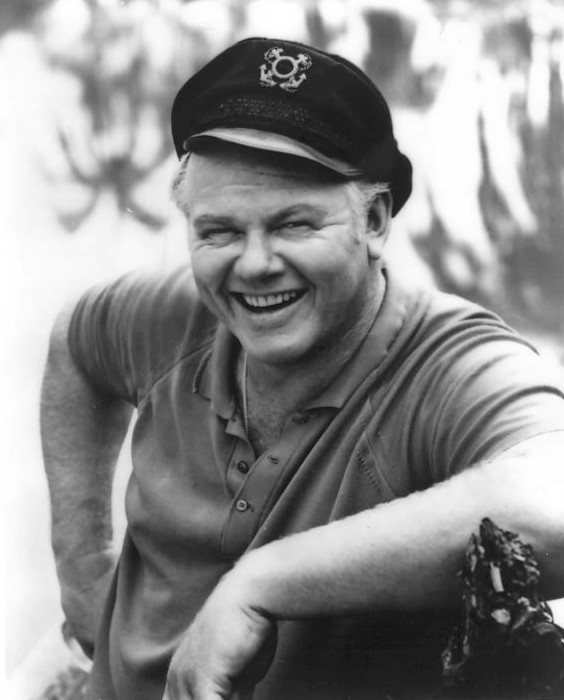
Alan Hale Jr. as The Skipper

Russell Johnson as The Professor

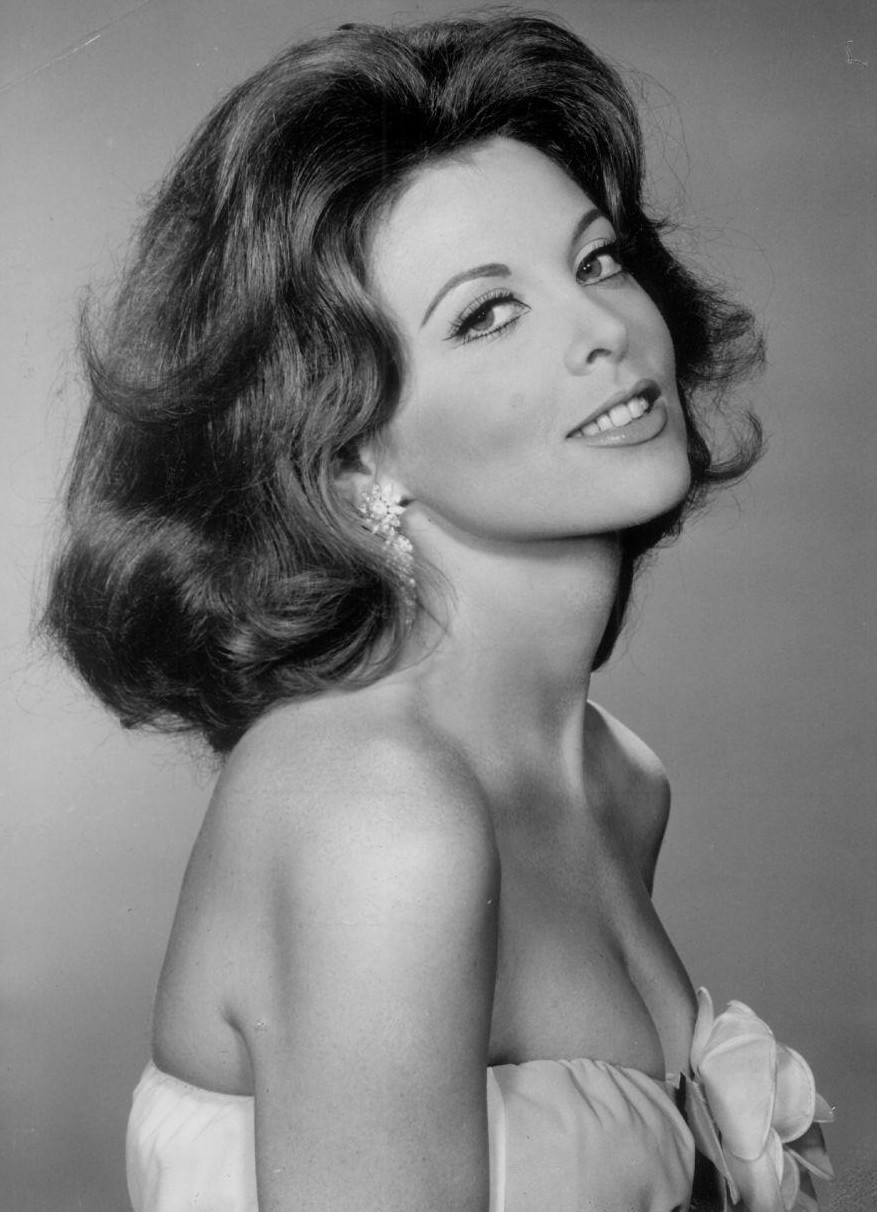
Tina Louise as Ginger Grant

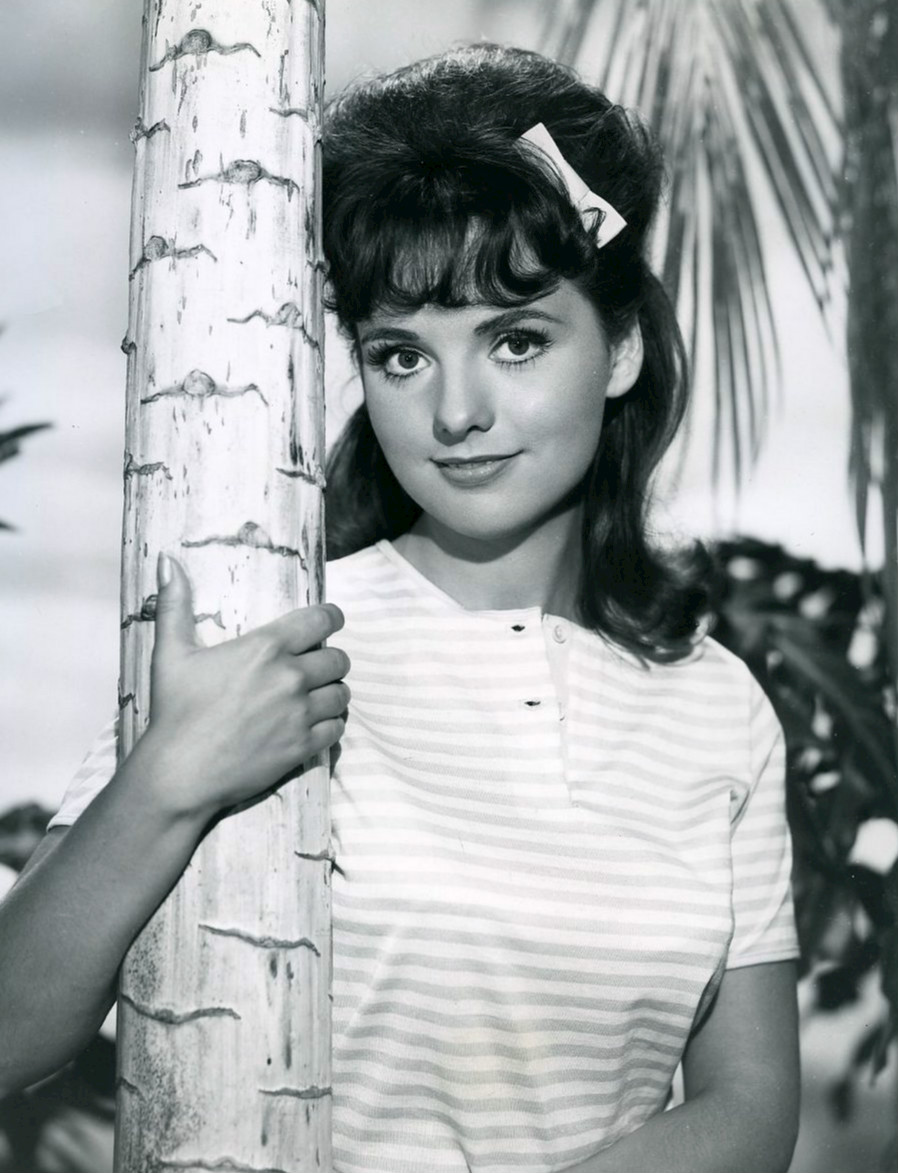
Dawn Wells as Mary Ann Summers

Gilligan's Island is an American sitcom created and produced by Sherwood Schwartz. The show's ensemble cast features Bob Denver, Alan Hale Jr., Jim Backus, Natalie Schafer, Tina Louise, Russell Johnson, and Dawn Wells. It aired for three seasons on the CBS network from September 26, 1964, to April 17, 1967.

The series follows the comic adventures of seven castaways as they struggle to survive on an island where they've been shipwrecked. Most episodes revolve around the dissimilar castaways' conflicts, and/or their unsuccessful attempts to escape their plight. The ship's inept first mate, Gilligan, is typically responsible (or at least blamed) for the failures.

Gilligan's Island ran for 98 episodes. All 36 episodes of the first season were filmed in black and white and were later colorized for syndication. The show's second and third seasons (62 episodes) and the three television film sequels (broadcast between 1978 and 1982) were filmed in color.

Gilligan's Island received solid ratings during its original run and grew in popularity during decades of syndication, especially in the 1970s and '80s, when many markets ran the show in the late afternoon.

== Premise ==
The two-man crew of the charter boat SS Minnow and five passengers on a "three-hour tour" from Honolulu run into a storm and are shipwrecked on an uncharted island somewhere in the Pacific Ocean. The exact location is said to be in conflicting longitudes/latitudes in three episodes.

Their efforts to be rescued are typically thwarted by the negligent conduct of the hapless first mate, Gilligan. In 1997, show creator Sherwood Schwartz explained that the underlying concept— people with different characters and backgrounds being in a situation where they need to learn how to get along and cooperate to survive— is still "the most important idea in the world today."

== Cast and characters ==
- Bob Denver as Willy Gilligan, the hapless first mate of the S.S. Minnow.
- Alan Hale Jr. as Captain Jonas Grumby ("The Skipper"), the captain of the S.S. Minnow
- Jim Backus as Thurston Howell III, a Wall Street millionaire
- Natalie Schafer as Eunice "Lovey" Howell, Thurston's wife
- Tina Louise as Ginger Grant, a Hollywood movie star
- Russell Johnson as Professor Roy Hinkley, Ph.D. ("The Professor")
- Dawn Wells as Mary Ann Summers, a wholesome farm girl from Winfield, Kansas, who won the trip and tour in a lottery
- Charles Maxwell (uncredited) as the voice of the recurring radio announcer

== Episodes ==
Season	Episodes	Originally released		
Season	Episodes	First released	Last released	Network
Pilot		October 16, 1992		TBS
1	36	September 26, 1964	June 12, 1965	CBS
2	32	September 16, 1965	April 28, 1966	CBS
3	30	September 12, 1966	April 17, 1967	CBS
Television films		October 14, 1978	October 14, 2001	NBC/CBS

=== Pilot episode ===
The pilot episode, "Marooned," was filmed in November 1963. The pilot featured seven characters (as in the series), but only four of the characters—and their associated actors—were carried forward into the series: Gilligan (Denver), the Skipper (Hale), and the Howells (Backus and Schafer).

Because of the three significant character and casting changes between the pilot episode and the first series episode, the pilot was not shown before the series first aired on September 26, 1964. The original pilot eventually aired over 29 years later on TBS.

The three characters who did not carry forward from the pilot were two secretaries and a high school teacher. In the pilot, the scientifically inclined Professor was instead a high school teacher played by John Gabriel. Ginger, the movie star, was still red-haired, but she worked as a secretary and was played by Kit Smythe. She was more sarcastic than the later incarnation. Mary Ann, the Kansas farm girl, was instead Bunny, Ginger's co-worker, played as a cheerful "dumb blonde" by Nancy McCarthy.

The pilot's opening and ending songs were two similar calypso-styled tracks written by John Williams and performed by Sherwood Schwartz impersonating singer Sir Lancelot. The lyrics of both differ from those of the TV series, and the pilot's opening theme song is longer. The short scenes during this initial music include Gilligan taking the Howells' luggage to the boat before cast-off and Gilligan trying to give a cup of coffee to the Skipper during the storm that would ultimately maroon the vessel.

After the opening theme song and credits end, the pilot proper begins with the seven castaways waking up on the beached SS Minnow. It continues with them performing various tasks, including exploring the island, trying to fix the transmitter, building huts, and finding food. Contrary to some descriptions, the pilot contained no detailed accounts of the characters' backgrounds. It concludes with the ending theme song and credits. The background music and even the laugh tracks of the pilot appear nearly identical to those used during the series.

=== First broadcast episode ===
The first episode broadcast, "Two on a Raft," is sometimes incorrectly referred to as the series pilot. This episode begins with the theme song performed by The Wellingtons and then the same scene of Gilligan and the Skipper awakening on the boat as in the pilot (though slightly differently cut to eliminate most shots of the departed actors) and continues with the characters sitting on the beach listening to a radio news report about their disappearance. No equivalent scene or background information is in the pilot, except for the description of the passengers in the original theme song. Rather than reshooting the rest of the pilot story for broadcast, the show proceeded. The plot thus skips over the topics of the pilot; the bulk of the episode tells of Gilligan and the Skipper setting off on a raft to try to bring help but unknowingly landing back on the other side of the same island.

The scene with the radio report is one of two scenes that reveal the names of the Skipper (Jonas Grumby) and the Professor (Roy Hinkley); the names are used in a similar radio report early in the series. The name Jonas Grumby appears nowhere else in the series except for an episode in which the Maritime Board of Review blames the Skipper for the loss of the Minnow. The name Roy Hinkley is used one other time when Mr. Howell introduces the Professor as Roy Huntley, and the Professor corrects him, to which Mr. Howell replies, "Brinkley, Brinkley."

The plot for the pilot episode was recycled into that season's Christmas episode, "Birds Gotta Fly, Fish Gotta Talk," in which the story of the pilot episode, concerning the practical problems on landing, is related through a series of flashbacks. Footage featuring characters that had been recast was reshot using the current actors. For scenes including only Denver, Hale, Backus, and Schafer, the original footage was reused.

=== Last broadcast episode ===
The last episode of the show, "Gilligan, the Goddess", aired on April 17, 1967, and ended just like the rest, with the castaways still stranded on the island. It was not known at the time that it would be the series finale, as a fourth season was expected but then canceled.

== Typical plots ==
The shipwrecked castaways are desperate to leave the island, and various opportunities frequently present themselves but invariably fail, nearly always due to some bumbling error committed by Gilligan. Sometimes, this results in Gilligan saving the others from some unforeseen danger or flaw in their plan. The only episode in which the entire cast leaves the island (albeit temporarily) is "The Friendly Physician" aired in Season 2.

Most episodes of Gilligan's Island use variations of five recurring basic plots:

- Life on the island. A running gag is the castaways' ability to fashion various useful objects from bamboo, coconuts, gourds, vines, and other local materials. Some are everyday items, such as eating and cooking utensils, while others (such as a dental drill and a remarkably efficient lie detector apparatus) are stretches of the imagination. Russell Johnson noted in his autobiography that the production crew enjoyed the challenge of building these props. These bamboo items include framed huts with thatched grass sides and roofs, bamboo closets strong enough to withstand hurricane-force winds and rain, a communal dining table and chairs, Gilligan's hot water pipes, a stethoscope, and a pedal-powered car.
- Visitors to the island. Another challenge to a viewer's suspension of disbelief is the remarkable frequency with which an assortment of people visit the remote, uncharted island, all of whom either refuse or fail to help rescue the castaways.
- Dream sequences in which one of the castaways dreams they are some character related to that week's storyline. All of the castaways appeared as other characters within the dream. In later interviews and memoirs, nearly all the actors stated that the dream episodes were among their favorites.
- A piece of news concerning one or more of the castaways is heard over the radio and causes distress or discord among them.
- The appearance or arrival of unusual objects to the island, such as a World War II naval mine, an old silent motion picture camera and costumes, a crate of radioactive vegetable seeds, plastic explosives, a robot, a live lion, a jet pack, or a wayward "Mars Lander" that the scientists who launched it think is sending them pictures of life on Mars.

Most of the slapstick comedic sequences between Hale and Denver were inspired by Laurel and Hardy, particularly when Hale breaks the fourth wall by looking directly into the camera, expressing his frustration with Denver's clumsiness, as Oliver Hardy often did.

=== Guest stars ===
Although most episodes do not have guest stars, given that the characters are on an uncharted, unknown island, a remarkable number of people manage to find their way to the island—and to leave without helping the castaways also escape. Among the actors who guest-starred were Rory Calhoun, Hans Conried, Zsa Zsa Gabor, Richard Kiel, Strother Martin, John McGiver, Denny Miller, Don Rickles, Kurt Russell, Vito Scotti, Phil Silvers, Larry Storch, and pop group The Wellingtons.

=== Dream sequences ===
One of the trademarks of Gilligan's Island is its frequent use of dream sequences. The showrunners used this device to expand beyond the premise's limited setting, and to showcase the cast's acting talents. Many episodes that feature dream sequences are ranked among the show's most memorable episodes, as most of them parodied or drew inspiration from works of literature, film, and other television shows of the day.

Each dream sequence is triggered by the real-life situation of the episode and usually features symbolism that prompted a change of heart in whichever castaway was dreaming. Of the fourteen dream episodes, eleven feature a Gilligan dream (with one of these episodes including short dreams of each of the male cast members). Mr. Howell, Mrs. Howell, and Mary Ann each have an episode centering on a dream of theirs, making Mr. Howell the only cast member besides Gilligan who has more than one dream sequence. The Skipper is presented as a woman in two dreams, although in one this is only a disguise; in Mrs. Howell's dream he is both her wicked stepmother and a different male character, making him the only cast member to have two roles in one dream and also the only one to be the opposite sex in a dream. The Professor appears twice as a faux Cary Grant: in Mary Ann's dream, and his own short dream. Ginger is the only one of the seven castaways who never had a dream sequence.

- "The Sound of Quacking" (S1E7)—Inspired by Gunsmoke (and filmed on the actual Gunsmoke set). Afraid that the starving castaways will eat his pet duck Emily, Gilligan dreams that he is U.S. Marshal Gilligan, whose primary task is keeping the rowdy citizens of his town from eating Emily, whom he keeps locked in a jail cell. Features the Skipper as the Marshal's limping deputy, Ginger as a sultry saloon girl, Mary Ann as the Marshal's sweetheart, Mrs. Howell as a duck-gravy-making Spanish señora, and Mr. Howell and the Professor as a lynch mob.
- "St. Gilligan and the Dragon" (S1E20)—All four men react to the girls' recent demand for equal rights by having dreams that reflect what they expect from their women. The Skipper dreams of being a sultan with Ginger, Mary Ann, and Mrs. Howell as his dancing girls. Mr. Howell dreams of relaxing in a spa with all three girls catering to his every whim. The Professor dreams that he is Cary Grant emerging from his dressing room only to be assaulted by the girls, his crazed fans. Gilligan, always childlike, dreams that he is a bullfighter and that the girls each bring him a gift.
- "My Fair Gilligan" (S1E35)—Gilligan's fears of his new life as the Howells' adopted son manifest when he dreams that he is a spoiled prince who callously orders the beheadings of any supplicant who displeases him. Features Mr. and Mrs. Howell as the pampering King and Queen, Mary Ann as a shepherd girl, the Professor as a wizardly astronomer, Ginger as a simpering court lady, and the Skipper as a naval admiral.
- "The Little Dictator" (S2E3)—Having just been appointed the puppet ruler of the island, Gilligan dreams that he is the dictator of a small foreign country on the brink of war, and the other castaways serve as his cabinet, who desperately try to convince him to look out his window at the chaos outside. Features Mr. Howell as the minister of finance, the Skipper as the secretary of the navy, Ginger as an undercover agent, the other castaways as cabinet members, and guest star Nehemiah Persoff as the masterminding dictator. It is notable for being the only dream sequence to feature a guest star as a main character.
- "The Sweepstakes" (S2E5)—Obsessed with finding Gilligan's lost sweepstake ticket, Mr. Howell dreams that he is a grizzled prospector in the Old West who has just struck millions of dollars' worth of gold, but the kingly treatment he receives in town is quickly revoked when he realizes that he doesn't have proof of his claim. Features the Professor as a crooked bank owner, Gilligan as the corrupt U.S. Marshal, Ginger as a smooth-talking saloon owner, Mary Ann as an impoverished country girl, and the Skipper as a cheating gambler. It is notable for being one of the few dream sequences in which one of the castaways does not appear (Mrs. Howell, in this case). Jim Backus reprised his role as the prospector in the three-part Grand Canyon episode in the third season of The Brady Bunch.
- "The Postman Cometh" (S2E18)—Inspired by Dr. Kildare and Ben Casey. Afraid that she is going to die from eating poisonous mushrooms, Mary Ann falls asleep listening to her medical soap opera radio show and dreams that she is a patient in a hospital for a fatal disease. Features Mr. Howell as the kooky Dr. Zorbagillespie, Gilligan as Dr. Charles Boyer, the Skipper as Dr. Matt Dillon, the Professor as Dr. Cary Grant, and Mrs. Howell and Ginger as somewhat sympathetic nurses.
- "V for Vitamins" (S2E30)—Inspired by "Jack and the Beanstalk". Gilligan falls asleep while guarding the last of the castaways' citrus rations and dreams that he is a farm boy named Jack tasked with retrieving oranges for his starving family. Instead, he buys magic beans, climbs a beanstalk, and enters a giant's castle. Features Mrs. Howell as Jack's mother, Mr. Howell as a W.C. Fields-inspired gangster, Mary Ann as the Giant's helpful maid, the Skipper as the Giant, and Ginger and the Professor as elderly captives in the Giant's dungeon. In the sequence where Jack runs from the Giant, Bob Denver's young son Patrick plays Jack and uses a forced perspective to make Jack look extra small.
- "Meet the Meteor" (S2E32)—When the Professor's measurements of radiation on a newly crashed meteor show it to be lethal, Gilligan dreams that the castaways have aged to extreme feebleness in only a few days. The castaways hobble from their huts to the dining table to celebrate one final anniversary on the island before they die of old age or an electrical storm destroys the island.
- "Up at Bat" (S3E1)—Inspired by Dracula and Sherlock Holmes. After supposedly being bitten by a vampire bat, Gilligan dreams that he is a ghoulish vampire inhabiting a haunted castle and eagerly awaiting the arrival of his guests, who also double as his dinner. It features Ginger as the vampire's ghostly wife, the Professor as Sherlock Holmes, and the Skipper as Dr. Watson (renamed "Colonel Watney"), Mr. and Mrs. Howell as unsuspecting guests in the house, and Mary Ann as the hideous housekeeper. Notable for being filmed on the same haunted mansion set from the earlier episode "The Friendly Physician" (S2E29) and for concluding with a brawl featuring superimposed onomatopoeic words in the style of rival series Batman.
- "The Invasion" (S3E11)—Inspired by James Bond. Gilligan's fears of being hunted down by secret agents show up in his dream, in which he is suave spy Agent 014 fighting against a criminal empire and its formidable group of assassins out to kill him and take away his top-secret briefcase. Features the Professor as the Chief Good Guy, Mr. Howell as Mr. Evil (inspired by Ernst Stavro Blofeld), Mrs. Howell as Mr. Evil's moll, Mary Ann as the deadly receptionist, Ginger as Gilligan's treacherous fiancée, and the Skipper as an evil agent disguised as Gilligan's mother.
- "And Then There Were None" (S3E13)—Inspired by Strange Case of Doctor Jekyll and Mister Hyde. Gilligan believes that he may be a murderous psychopath and dreams that he is on trial as an Oscar Wilde-style Doctor Gilligan, who transforms into a hideous monster at the mention of food. Features Mrs. Howell as his defense attorney Mary Poppins (renamed "Mary Poplin"), Mary Ann as the loyal Eliza Doolittle (who has confused Henry Jekyll for Henry Higgins), Ginger as the Lady in Red, Mr. Howell as a biased judge, the Professor as the prosecuting attorney, and the Skipper as the bailiff.
- "Court-Martial" (S3E17)—Gilligan dreams that he is Lord Admiral Gilligan, the youngest in the British fleet, charged with protecting the three noble ladies on board when the ship is attacked and captured by uncouth pirates. Features Mr. Howell as Captain Hook, the Professor as Long John Silver, the Skipper as Captain Kidd, Mrs. Howell as the queen mother, and Ginger and Mary Ann as her daughters.
- "Lovey's Secret Admirer" (S3E19)—Inspired by "Cinderella". After a fight with her husband, Mrs. Howell dreams of being Cinderella, oppressed by her wicked stepfamily but determined to attend the royal ball and meet the prince. Features the Skipper as Cinderella's stepmother, Ginger and Mary Ann as the ugly stepsisters, Gilligan as the inept Fairy Godfather, Mr. Howell as the self-absorbed prince, and the Skipper and the Professor as pages.
- "The Secret of Gilligan's Island" (S3E25)—Gilligan's discovery of an ancient stone tablet on the island leads him to dream that he and the castaways are cave people, each with a goal or fear about leaving their familiar caves in search of a better land. Features Gilligan as an artistic stonecutter, the Skipper as his best friend, Mr. Howell as the dictatorial chief, Mrs. Howell as his jealous wife, Ginger and Mary Ann as cave girls seeking husbands, and the Professor as an inventor.

== Production ==
The show was filmed at CBS Studio Center, 4024 Radford Avenue in Studio City, Los Angeles. The same stage was later used for The Mary Tyler Moore Show and Roseanne, the latter of which featured a daydream parodying Gilligan's Island in one episode. The lagoon was drained and used as a parking lot during the show's off-season. It was the last surviving element of the show and was demolished in 1997 as part of an expansion project.

Four boats were used as the SS Minnow. The one shown in the opening credits was rented in Ala Wai Yacht Harbor in Honolulu. Another, the Bluejacket, was used in the opening credits shown during the second and third seasons and eventually turned up for sale on Vancouver Island in August 2006 after running aground on a reef in the Hecate Strait on the way south from Alaska. One boat was used for beach scenes after being towed to Moloa'a Beach on the northeast side of the island of Kauai in Hawaii. The fourth Minnow was built on the CBS Studios set in the second season. The Minnow was named in reference to Newton Minow, chairman of the U.S. FCC, in response to Minow's landmark 1961 speech "Television and the Public Interest"; the speech lambasted television producers for producing, among other things, "formula comedies about totally unbelievable" characters and creating a "vast wasteland" of bad television.

The final day of filming the pilot was Friday, November 22, 1963, the day of the assassination of President John F. Kennedy. The cast and crew learned of the assassination late that morning, Hawaii time. Between the filming of scenes, they crowded around a radio listening to news bulletins. A reminder of the tragedy appears in the opening sequence of the show's first season when the theme song is played. As the Minnow is leaving the harbor and heading out to sea, an American flag flying at half staff can be seen in the background.

=== Casting ===
Bob Denver was not the first choice to play Gilligan; actor Jerry Van Dyke was offered the role, but he turned it down, believing that the show would never be successful. He chose instead to play the lead in My Mother the Car, which premiered the following year and is frequently cited as one of the worst television shows of all time; it was canceled after one season. The producers looked to Bob Denver, the actor who had played Maynard G. Krebs, the beatnik in The Many Loves of Dobie Gillis. Schwartz was initially reluctant to cast Denver, as he didn't want Gilligan to be a beatnik type character, but eventually agreed that Denver was a good choice.

Schwartz had an extremely difficult time casting the role of the Skipper, as the character had to be gruff, but affable at the same time. Actor Carroll O'Connor was among those who auditioned, but could not bring the right combination into the role. Schwartz almost gave up, before actor Alan Hale Jr. became available, and was cast. According to his wife, "(Hale) was born to play the Skipper".

Schwartz had written the role of Thurston Howell III specifically for Jim Backus, with whom he was close friends. However, at the time Backus was not immediately available for the role, holding out for a pilot to become a potential series, and he was too expensive to be hired for a supporting role with the show's limited budget. Eventually, Backus became available, and liked the script enough to join the cast, and CBS approved a budget increase to cast him.

Natalie Schafer had it written into her contract that no close-ups would be made of her, but it was forgotten after a while in the series. Schafer was 63 when the pilot was shot, although, reportedly, no one on the set or in the cast knew her actual age, and she refused to divulge it. Initially, she accepted the role only because the pilot was filmed on location in Hawaii. She looked at the job as nothing more than a free vacation, as she was convinced that a show this silly would "never go."

Tina Louise clashed with producer Sherwood Schwartz because she initially believed she was hired as the central character. The character of Ginger was originally written as a hard-nosed, sharp-tongued temptress, but Louise argued that this portrayal was too harsh and refused to play her as written. A compromise was reached; Louise agreed to play Ginger as a Marilyn Monroe/Jayne Mansfield type. Her temperament reportedly made her difficult to work with, but she was always professional when it came time to shoot. Louise continued to disagree with producers over her role and was the only cast member who refused to appear in any of the three post-series TV movies. After many years of distancing herself from the show, she appeared in a reunion of the cast on two television talk shows in 1982 and 1988 and on an episode of Roseanne in 1995 when the Roseanne cast re-enacted Gilligan's Island. In the pilot episode, the character of Ginger was played by actress Kit Smythe.

Russell Johnson played the part of the Professor. John Gabriel was initially cast as the academic character, a high school teacher. After testing, the network didn't believe the character scored well with the audience. Auditions were held for the revised role of the Professor, which included Dabney Coleman, but the part was ultimately won by Johnson. Before his acting career, he had served as a bombardier in 44 combat missions over the Pacific during World War II. On March 4, 1945, the B-25 he was flying as the navigator was shot down, killing the copilot and breaking both of Johnson's ankles. At the time of his audition, he worked primarily in movies and was not very interested in a television show unless he would be the leading character. His film career had been going well, tallying several science fiction and Western film credits, including a role opposite Ronald Reagan in the 1953 film Law and Order. In addition to movies, Johnson had landed roles in multiple popular television series such as The Adventures of Superman, The Twilight Zone and The Outer Limits. Johnson was initially reluctant to accept the role of the Professor as he felt it wasn't good for him; with six other leads, his agent had to talk him into going to the audition, but after meeting Sherwood Schwartz, he started to warm up to the idea of playing the Professor. In discussing his role, he laughingly said he was unsure what was more difficult, remembering the Professor's technically oriented lines or looking up what they meant.

Dawn Wells was a former Miss Nevada when she auditioned for the Mary Ann role. Her competition included Raquel Welch and Pat Priest. The pilot episode featured a different character ("Bunny") played by actress Nancy McCarthy. After it was shot, the network decided to recast the roles of the Professor and the two young women. Mary Ann became a simple farm girl from Winfield, Kansas.

=== Theme song ===
The music and lyrics for the theme song, "The Ballad of Gilligan's Isle", were written by Sherwood Schwartz and George Wyle.

"Just sit right back, and you'll hear a tale, a tale of a fateful trip

That started from this tropic port aboard this tiny ship

The Mate was a mighty sailing man, the Skipper, brave and sure

Five passengers set sail that day for a three-hour tour; a three-hour tour

The weather started getting rough, the tiny ship was tossed

If not for the courage of the fearless crew, the Minnow would be lost; the Minnow would be lost

The ship set ground on the shore of this uncharted desert isle

With Gilligan, the Skipper too, the millionaire, and his wife

The movie star and the rest are here on Gilligan's Isle"

In Season 2, the last two lyrics became:

"With Gilligan, a Skipper too, a millionaire, and his wife

A movie star, a professor, and Mary Ann, here on Gilligan's Isle"

The lyrics were changed because Denver personally asked studio executives to add the Professor and Mary Ann's names to the song. When the studio at first refused, saying it would be too expensive to reshoot, Denver insisted, even going so far as to state that if Johnson and Wells were not included, he wanted his name out of the song as well. The studio caved, and "the Professor and Mary Ann" were added and replaced the words "and the rest are" in the last line of the lyrics above. The theme song in the original pilot did not even mention the character Ginger, with the last two mentioned by name being "the Millionaire and Mrs. Millionaire" followed by "...and the other tourists".

The show also featured a separate theme song for the end credits using the same melody, but with a slightly faster tempo:

"Now this is a tale of our castaways, they're here for a long, long time

They'll have to make the best of things; it's an uphill climb

The First Mate and his Skipper too will do their very best

To make the others comfortable in their tropic island nest

No phones, no lights no motorcars, not a single luxury

Like Robinson Crusoe, it's primitive as can be

So join us here each week my friends, you're sure to get a smile

From seven stranded castaways, here on Gilligan's Isle"

The first-season version was recorded by the folk group The Wellingtons. The second-season version, which incorporated more of a sea shanty sound, was uncredited, but according to Russell Johnson in his book Here on Gilligan's Isle, it was performed by a group called the Eligibles.

The show's original pilot episode featured a calypso theme song by composer John Williams and different lyrics. The original length of the voyage was "a six-hour ride", not "a three-hour tour". John Williams (or Johnny Williams as he was often listed in the show credits) was the initial composer of the incidental music for the show (from 1964 to 1965), but was replaced by Gerald Fried for the remaining seasons (1965–1967).

==== Later parodies and homages ====
The band Little Roger and the Goosebumps recorded "Stairway to Gilligan's Island", a parody of Led Zeppelin's "Stairway to Heaven", substituting the words to the Gilligan's Island theme song. In 1987, The Iceman parodied Madonna's "La Isla Bonita" as "La Isla Gilligan". "Weird Al" Yankovic recorded a song called "Isle Thing", a parody of Tone Lōc's "Wild Thing", about a rapper whose girlfriend introduces him to the show. Yankovic also mentions the show in his song "Stop Draggin' My Car Around," a parody of "Stop Draggin' My Heart Around" by Stevie Nicks and Tom Petty and the Heartbreakers (1981). He also used one verse from the closing theme lyrics in "Amish Paradise" (1996), a parody of Coolio's "Gangsta's Paradise" (1995). The song has also been covered by many bands, including Bowling for Soup for the TBS show The Real Gilligan's Island. Israel Kamakawiwoʻole also recorded a comic tribute to the theme song on his album E Ala E. The chorus to rap group Big Tymers' "Still Fly" is based on the Gilligan's Island theme song.

== Cancellation ==
During the 1966–1967 television season, Gilligan's Island aired on Mondays at 7:30 p.m. Eastern time. Although the sitcom's ratings had fallen well out of the top-30 programs, during the last few weeks of its third season, the series was still winning its timeslot against its main competition, The Monkees, which aired at the same time on NBC. Therefore, CBS assured Sherwood Schwartz that Gilligan's Island would be picked up for a fourth year.

CBS, however, had signaled its intention to cancel the long-running Western series Gunsmoke, which had been airing late on Saturday nights during the 1966–1967 television season. Under pressure from CBS network president William S. Paley and his wife Babe, along with many network affiliates and longtime fans of Gunsmoke, CBS rescheduled the Western to an earlier time slot on Mondays at 7:30 p.m. Eastern time. As a result, Gilligan's Island was quietly canceled at practically the last minute while the cast members were all on vacation. Based on Sherwood Schwartz's verbal confirmation that the series would be renewed for a fourth season, some of the cast had bought houses near the set.

== Nielsen ratings/television schedule ==
Season	Ep#	Season premiere	Season finale	Time slot	Rank	Rating	Households
1 (1964–1965)	36	September 26, 1964	June 12, 1965	Saturdays at 8:30 p.m. eastern time	#18	24.7 (tie)	13,227,700
2 (1965–1966)	32	September 16, 1965	April 28, 1966	Thursdays at 8:00 p.m. eastern time	#22	22.1	11,900,850
3 (1966–1967)	30	September 12, 1966	April 17, 1967	Mondays at 7:30 p.m. eastern time	#49	N/A	N/A

== Film sequels ==
Three television film sequels were made—the first independently, the other two in association with Universal Television.

In the 1978 TV film, Rescue from Gilligan's Island, the castaways successfully leave the island but have difficulty reintegrating into society. During a reunion cruise on the first Christmas after their rescue, fate intervenes, and they find themselves wrecked on the same island at the end of the film. It starred the original cast, except for Tina Louise, who refused to participate because of her disputes with the producers and was replaced by Judith Baldwin. The plot involved Soviet agents seeking a memory disc from a spy satellite that landed on the island and facilitated the protagonists' rescue.

In a 1979 sequel, The Castaways on Gilligan's Island, they are rescued once again, and the Howells convert the island into a getaway resort with the other five castaways as "silent partners." Ginger was again played by Judith Baldwin.

In a 1981 sequel, The Harlem Globetrotters on Gilligan's Island, villains played by Martin Landau and then-wife Barbara Bain try to take over the island to gain access to a vein of "supremium", a valuable but volatile fictional element. They are thwarted by the timely intervention of the Harlem Globetrotters. This time, Ginger was played by Constance Forslund. Jim Backus, who was in poor health then, was written out of the script by saying Thurston Howell III was tending to Howell Industries back on the mainland. David Ruprecht played the role of his son, Thurston Howell IV, who was asked to manage the resort. However, Backus insisted on maintaining continuity and made a cameo appearance at the end of the film.

In September 1992, it was reported Sherwood Schwartz and his son Lloyd J. Schwartz were negotiating a possible feature film adaptation titled Gilligan’s Island: The Movie with Ted Turner and Columbia Pictures.

In 2008, Sherwood Schwartz stated he would like a modern-day movie adaptation of Gilligan's Island with Michael Cera as Gilligan and Beyoncé Knowles as Ginger.

== Spin-offs and timelines ==
The New Adventures of Gilligan is a Filmation-produced animated remake that aired on ABC on Saturday mornings from September 7, 1974, to September 4, 1977, for 24 episodes (16 installments airing in 1974–75 and eight new ones combined with repeats in 1975–76). The voices were provided by the original cast except for Ginger and Mary Ann (both were voiced by Jane Webb). Dawn Wells could not participate because she was in a touring production. An additional character was Gilligan's pet, Snubby the Monkey.

Gilligan's Planet is an animated science-fiction version produced by Filmation and starring the voices of the Gilligan's Island cast, save for Tina Louise (Dawn Wells voiced both Mary Ann and Ginger). In a follow-up to The New Adventures of Gilligan, the castaways escape from the island by building a spaceship and get shipwrecked on a distant planet. Only 13 episodes aired on CBS between September 18, 1982, and September 3, 1983. In the episode "Let Sleeping Minnows Lie", they travel to an island and get shipwrecked there, and Gilligan observes, "First we were stranded on an island, then we were stranded on a planet, and now we're stranded on an island on a planet."

== Related productions ==
- Gilligan's Island: The Musical was first produced in the early 1990s. Its script was by Lloyd Schwartz, Sherwood Schwartz's son, and its songs were written by Schwartz's daughter and son-in-law, Hope and Laurence Juber.
- Gilligan's Wake is a 2003 parallel novel loosely based on the 1960s CBS sitcom, from the viewpoints of the seven major characters, written by Esquire film and television critic Tom Carson. The title is derived from the title of the TV show and Finnegans Wake, the seminal work of Irish novelist James Joyce.
- On November 30, 2004, the TBS network launched a reality series titled The Real Gilligan's Island, which placed two groups of people on an island, leaving them to fend for themselves in the manner of Survivor—the catch being that each islander matched a character type established in the original series (a klutz, a sea captain, a movie star, a millionaire's wife, etc.). While heavily marketed by TBS, the show turned out to be a flop with a very Survivor-like feel, but little of its success. A second season began June 8, 2005, with two-hour episodes for four weeks. TBS announced in July 2005 that a third season of the show would not be produced.

== Syndication ==
Syndication is handled by Warner Bros. Television (under Turner Entertainment Co., which in 1986 acquired United Artists Television's share of the series as part of the classic pre-1986 Metro-Goldwyn-Mayer library). It aired on TBS from 1986 to 2003, where it also aired with colorization on season one for a while. TBS aired Gilligan's Island weekday mornings at 8:05 a.m. ET throughout the 1990s, often paired with Bewitched. TNT aired it at some point in the 1990s and also aired the colorized season one. Nick at Nite later aired the series from 2000 to 2001. It then shifted to TV Land, where it aired from 2001 to 2003 and again from January to June 2014. In 2004, it aired on Hallmark Channel.

In 2015, the show started to air nationally on MeTV until it was removed in 2025. It has since returned to MeTV in 2026, airing Sundays at 2:00 p.m. EST. It currently airs on sister network Catchy Comedy, airing Saturdays from 3:00 to 5:00 p.m. EST.

Warner/Turner also handles the two Filmation-produced animated sequel series, while other companies handle the three TV movie sequels.

In the UK, Gilligan's Island had a very brief run on ITV in April 1965, but it was dropped after 13 episodes.

Gilligan's Island has briefly aired on MBC in the MENA region.

== Home media ==
Warner Home Video released all three seasons of Gilligan's Island on DVD in Region 1 between 2004 and 2005. The Complete First Season features all 36 episodes unedited with the original theme song in their original black-and-white format. The special features include the rare pilot episode with commentary from creator Sherwood Schwartz and three other featurettes.

The Complete Second Season includes all 32 season-two episodes in color. Bonuses for this set include a season-two introduction with Russell Johnson and Sherwood Schwartz and audio commentary on the season's third episode, "The Little Dictator".

The Complete Third Season includes all 30 season-three episodes. Special features include a season introduction with Russell Johnson and Sherwood Schwartz, commentary on the season's fourth episode, "The Producer," guest-starring Phil Silvers, and a 15-minute documentary titled Gilligan's Island: A Pop Culture Phenomenon.

The Complete Series Collection contains all the same bonuses and featurettes for a complete series box set in 2007. In April 2012, the series was reissued in new DVD releases.

The series is also available at the iTunes Store.

DVD name	Ep#	Release date
The Complete First Season	36	February 3, 2004
The Complete Second Season	32	January 11, 2005
The Complete Third Season	30	July 26, 2005
The Complete Series Collection	98	November 6, 2007

In August 2006, an executive at Warner Bros. announced plans that Gilligan's Island, in addition to other classic TV series owned by the studio, would be digitally re-mastered in HD. The original TV series was shot on high-resolution film but scaled down for broadcast.

On January 20, 2014, TV Land became the first network to air theatrical-style widescreen HD remastered episodes of Gilligan's Island. This marked the first time fans and the general public saw the WB remastered episodes.

HD remastered episodes have been made available for purchase through streaming media sources.

== In other media ==
Two board games based on the show, both called The Gilligan's Island Game featuring Gilligan, Thurston Howell III, and the Skipper on the box cover, were manufactured by Game Gems and released in 1965. The New Adventures of Gilligan, based on the short-lived cartoon of the same name and featuring all castaways, was manufactured by Milton Bradley and was released in 1974.

A set of trading cards was released by Topps in 1965. A pinball machine, manufactured by Bally and based on the show, was released in May 1991. A video game based on the series, called The Adventures of Gilligan's Island and manufactured by Bandai, was released for the Nintendo Entertainment System in July 1990. The game features the likenesses of all the original castaways except for Ginger, who is absent from the game. A video slot machine, manufactured by International Game Technology and loosely based on the show, was released in 2004.

== Ginger or Mary Ann? ==
The question of which of these two characters fans of the show prefer has endured long after the end of the series. The question has inspired commercials, essays, videos, and a sermon. By most accounts, the wholesome Mary Ann has consistently outpolled the glamorous movie-star Ginger by a sizable margin. Bob Denver admitted he was a Mary Ann fan. According to Denver in a 2001 interview, Wells received 3,000–5,000 fan letters weekly. In contrast, Louise may have had 1,500 or 2,000.

== See also ==
- Surviving Gilligan's Island, 2001 documentary co-produced by and starring Dawn Wells, about production of the show
