= The Many Loves of Dobie Gillis season 4 =

The Many Loves of Dobie Gillis
- Season 4
- No. of episodes: 36

Release
- Original network: CBS
- Original release: September 26, 1962 – June 5, 1963

Season chronology
- ← Previous; Season 3

This is a list of episodes from the fourth and final season of The Many Loves of Dobie Gillis; the series' title was changed to Max Shulman's Dobie Gillis during this season.

This season continues with the misadventures of Dobie Gillis and his best friend Maynard G. Krebs at Central City's S. Peter Pryor Junior College, Dobie continuing to deal with life with his parents, Herbert and Winifred Gillis, and working in (or trying not to work in) his father's grocery store. Two new recurring characters were added: Virgil Gillis, Herbert's dishonest would-be music star cousin from Tennessee, and Duncan "Dunky" Gillis, Dobie's cousin and Herbert's nephew, who comes to live with the Gillis family and becomes Maynard's running partner.

Sheila James and William Schallert left Dobie Gillis before the start of the fourth season; Schallert to star in the pilot for Philbert and James to star in the pilot for a Dobie Gillis spinoff, Zelda. Both shows went unsold, and James returned to Dobie on a freelance basis for four episodes towards the end of this final season.

== Broadcast history ==
The season originally aired Wednesdays at 8:30-9:00 pm (EST) on CBS from September 26, 1962, to June 5, 1963, moving from its original Tuesday at 8:30pm slot. The series fell out of the Top 30 during this season and was cancelled by CBS in spring 1963.

== DVD release ==
The entire series was released on DVD by Shout! Factory.

== Cast ==
=== Main ===
- Dwayne Hickman as Dobie Gillis
- Frank Faylen as Herbert T. Gillis (28 episodes)
- Florida Friebus as Winifred "Winnie" Gillis (19 episodes)
- Bob Denver as Maynard G. Krebs

=== Recurring ===
- Ray Hemphill as Cousin Virgil Gillis (3 episodes)
- Bobby Diamond as Duncan "Dunky" Gillis (7 episodes)
- Sheila James as Zelda Gilroy (4 episodes)
- Steve Franken as Chatsworth Osborne, Jr. (4 episodes)
- Doris Packer as Mrs. Chatsworth Osbourne, Sr. (5 episodes)
- Jean Byron as Dr. Imogene Burkhart (10 episodes)
- Tuesday Weld as Thalia Menninger (1 special guest appearance)

== Episodes ==
No. overall	No. in season	Title	Directed by	Written by	Original release date
112	1	"A Funny Thing Happened to Me on the Way to a Funny Thing"	Rod Amateau	Bud Nye	September 26, 1962
Dobie and Maynard are working as janitors in a high rise office building. They hear the siren of a fire truck and see a large crowd down on the street. Out on the ledge outside their window is a man (Richard Clair) about to jump. Dobie tries to talk the man out of jumping. Maynard then gets out on the ledge and manages to get the man to go back inside. Maynard falls off the ledge and is caught by the firemen on the street. Maynard tries to explain what happened and winds up in the college hospital under observation. At first Herbert and Winnie think it might do Maynard some good, but then they want to get him out. Dean Magruder (Raymond Bailey) is holding a hearing as to whether or not Maynard should be kicked out of school. Dr. Litweiler (James Millhollin) describes the tests they performed on Maynard and how things didn't go well. Winnie and Herbert both try to defend Maynard but it doesn't help. The hearing is over and Magruder says he will make his decision. Dobie comes up with a plan to get Maynard out of the hospital and it almost works. Magruder wants Maynard out of school. Dobie manages to get Magruder to change his mind. Later, Maynard and Herbert wind up in a situation where they try to stop the same man from jumping off a pier. Note: Dobie does an extended imitation of the eponymous character from Ben Casey in attempts to break Maynard out of the hospital.
113	2	"What's a Little Murder Between Friends?"	Rod Amateau	Max Shulman	October 3, 1962
Thalia Menninger (final appearance of Tuesday Weld) wants a list of Dobie's assets and net worth before she'll let him propose to her. Dobie tells her that he made her the beneficiary of his GI insurance policy worth $10,000. Thalia says that doesn't do her any good as long as he's alive. Dobie is late for a class and Thalia tells him a short cut, which turns out to be a firing range. Dobie then overhears Thalia offer Maynard some money to do something. Things start happening to Dobie and he believes Thalia and Maynard are plotting to murder him. Dobie then hears what sounds like Herbert and Winnie planning on helping Thalia. Dobie sees Herbert sharpening a large knife. What Dobie doesn't know is that Thalia just wants him to go out west where he has better prospects. And she's planning a going away party at the old Osbourne hunting lodge. Winnie suggests that Herbert take Dobie duck hunting. Herbert wakes Dobie up while holding a rifle and Dobie jumps out a window. Dobie goes to the police and talks to Sgt. Lafferty (Dennis Patrick). Dobie says that his family and friends want to kill him. Dobie wants Lafferty to stake out the hunting lodge. Lafferty says he will, but he really won't. It's the night of the party and all the guests are there. Everyone hides when they see Dobie and Thalia coming. Dobie winds up alone in the dark house and gives the signal for the police, but no one shows up. Winnie, Herbert, Thalia and Maynard show up and Dobie is frightened. Dobie finally finds out about the party. Dobie tells Thalia he isn't going out west and they break up. Paul 'Mousie' Garner as Short Policeman. Kelton Garwood as Officer Fogarty. Note: This episode's plot will be similar to the 1988 TV reunion film Bring Me The Head of Dobie Gillis.
114	3	"Northern Comfort"	Rod Amateau	Dean Riesner	October 10, 1962
Virgil T. Gillis, Herbert's nephew from Chicken Run, Tennessee, has come north to audition for talent agent Charles Wayzak (Charles Lane). Charles tells Virgil that to improve his act he needs a girl sidekick with good legs and a better costume. Charles also wants Virgil to perform in front of a crowd to gauge audience reaction. Meanwhile, Herbert just received a $300 dividend check from his GI insurance. Virgil shows up at the grocery store and quickly sweet talks his way into being invited to stay. Maynard doesn't trust Virgil and thinks he's a phony. Dobie's girlfriend, Grace Grimsby, comes by and Virgil sees a girl with great legs. Virgil finds a way for Grace to break up with Dobie. He then makes Dobie think that he'll be able to get them back together if Virgil could take her out and talk up Dobie. But Virgil will need money and a new suit, which Dobie gets him. Virgil talks Herbert into staging another benefit with a large crowd. On the date, Virgil tries to talk Grace into being on stage with him. Virgil sweet talks Herbert into letting him perform at the benefit and gets Winnie to make him costumes. Virgil needs an electric guitar. Virgil gets Herbert's $300 and then wins more playing poker with Herbert's friends. It's the night of the benefit and Virgil performs with Grace dancing next to him. Charles Wayzak is still not that impressed. Maynard unintentionally helps Virgil win over Charles. Albert Cavens as Poker Player. George DeNormand as Poker Player.
115	4	"The Ugliest American"	Rod Amateau	Joel Kane	October 17, 1962
There's a bar fight in a jungle bar. Himelmayer (Sig Ruman) is there watching it. Himelmeyer then has a drink with Dobie. Back to the real world. Dobie enrolls in Dr. Burkhart's (Jean Byron) anthropology class to be near Clydene Quigley (Laraine Stephens). Dr. Burkhart tells him they will be taking a field trip to the Amazon jungle. Maynard enrolls as well because of Dobie. The class is in the jungle and Dobie pretends to not be scared because Clydene isn't. Dobie's romance with Clydene is going nowhere and he's not doing well academically. Clydene is very impressed with Maynard and all the native relics he's found. To win Clydene back, Dobie claims to have found the most prized artifact in the jungle: a shrunken head. Dobie treks to the village and finds Himelmayer, who is supposed to be an influential man in the area. Burkhart tells Dobie that Maynard is missing. Dobie buys a shrunken head from Himelmayer. When he gets back to camp, Burkhart and Clydene look at the head and it looks like Maynard. Everyone thinks Dobie had something to do with it and they turn him over to the police. Fearing for his life, Dobie escapes into the jungle. He runs into some natives and one is wearing Maynard's shoes. Dobie is put into a pot to be cooked. Maynard shows up wearing native clothes and is apparently their king now. Maynard showed the natives how to make fake shrunken heads out of coconuts. Everyone is finally home except Maynard. But it's not long before he shows up. Anthony Eustrel as Ex-Viceroy of India. Nacho Galindo as Manuel. Albert Cavens as Bartender.
116	5	"A Splinter Off the Old Block"	Rod Amateau	Max Shulman	October 24, 1962
Herbert is thrilled to see his brother, Timothy Gillis (Ollie O'Toole). Tim travels a lot digging oil wells, so he doesn't get to visit often. Tim wonders if his son Duncan can stay with Herbert as Tim has to go to Africa. Herbert is not happy about the prospect of having a teenager in the house. "Dunky" comes in the store with Clarissa Spangler (Ahna Capri), a girl he just met outside. Dunky immediately starts to drive Herbert crazy. Later, Dunky asks Dobie's advice on how to win over Clarissa. Dobie suggests that he find some family tragedy to appeal to Clarissa's sympathy. Cathy Morin breaks up with Dobie. Dunky leads Clarissa to believe that Dobie is an alcoholic. Clarissa is now very interested in Dunky. Dunky confesses to Dobie what he told Clarissa. Clarissa told Miss Donna Whittaker (Ellen Burstyn), a social worker, about Dobie and Donna is coming by to help Dobie. Donna arrives and Dobie is immediately taken with her. Donna mistakenly believes that Herbert and Winnie are encouraging Dobie's drinking. Donna and Dobie spend a lot of time together as she "rehabilitates" him. The two wind up liking each other. Clarissa breaks up with Dunky because Dobie is now cured and there is no more tragedy. Dunky tells Clarissa that Dobie is now addicted to gambling. Hank Ladd as Drunk. Albert Cavens as Waiter. Note: First appearance of Bobby Diamond as Duncan "Dunky" Gillis.
117	6	"What Makes the Varsity Drag?"	Guy Scarpitta	Bud Nye	October 31, 1962
Dobie falls for Pryor's pretty new drum majorette, Lottie Lee McQuiddy. She wants nothing to do with Dobie until she mistakenly believes he's a football player. To keep the ruse going, Dobie claims he's a quarterback. Dobie talking to Lottie Lee doesn't sit well with her huge, but not too bright, boyfriend Stanislau "Roadblock" Jahurski. Roadblock is a football player at S.C. Dental. Maynard calls Roadblock "shorty" and he goes blank. After they leave, Lottie Lee returns and brings Roadblock to. Dobie talks Coach Prendergast (Bert Freed) into letting him join the team. Dobie knows he'll never actually play as the team has three other quarterbacks. Herbert is thrilled that Dobie is on the team. Dobie spends a lot of time with Lottie Lee. Roadblock vows to get even with Dobie at the next game. Because of Maynard's clumsiness, the three quarterbacks become incapacitated. Dobie tries various ways to be kicked off the team. Prendergast comes to realize that Dobie knows nothing about football. Prendergast pulls some strings to get some other quarterbacks. Roadblock knocks the three quarterbacks out of the game and it's Dobie's turn. Because of Maynard, Dobie hurts his neck. Maynard pretends to be Dobie and gets into the game. Maynard calls Roadblock "shorty" and he goes blank. Maynard wins the game and everyone finds out it wasn't Dobie.
118	7	"Like, Hi, Explosives"	Rod Amateau	Bud Nye & Joel Kane	November 7, 1962
Maynard and Dunky are in the Gillis grocery truck and pull up to a police barracade. Dunky drives through the barricade. Earlier, Mrs. Osbourne tells Dobie he better bring her niece Victoria home early. Dobie manages to lose what money he had when Mrs. Osbourne challenges him to arm wrestling and he loses. Victoria will only go out with Dobie that night if he has some money. Dobie calls Dunky and Maynard saying they need to bring him $25 immediately. Dunky tries to get the money from the cash register but that sets off a bunch of alarms. To make some money, Maynard and Dunky volunteer to transport a canister for truck driver McGinty. They're supposed to pick up weed killer, but Maynard takes a canister of nitroglycerin. The police are notified and a radio alert is broadcast. On the way to meet Dobie, Dunky stops for a woman on the sidewalk (Pamela Austin), but she's not interested in him. The truck then stalls on a railroad track because it's overheated. Maynard pushes the truck off the tracks just in time. Dobie hears about the truck on the radio and realizes it's Maynard and Dunky. Maynard and Dunky are now at the police barracade. Because he doesn't have a driver's licence Dunky doesn't want to be stopped by the police and drives through. They show up at the Osbourne mansion with the nitro. Dobie puts the canister down a well where something Mrs. Osbourne does, causes it to explode. This produces an oil gusher. Chet Brandenburg as State Police Marshal. Joe Brooks as Nitro Truck Worker.
119	8	"Where Is Thy Sting?"	Rod Amateau	Joel Kane	November 14, 1962
The latest girl Dobie is crazy for is pre-med student Emily Busby (Eilene Janssen). She's not interested in him as she is only concerned with taking care of sick people. Dobie lies to her and says he only has six months to live. Now Emily wants to be with him. Emily lets Maynard know about Dobie's condition. Dobie tells Maynard not to tell anyone, but he tells Dobie's parents. Herbert and Winnie start waiting on Dobie hand and foot. Dobie tells Maynard the truth. Dr. Burkhart hears about Dobie and wants to give him a complete examination. Instead of telling the truth, Dobie says he's cured and feels great. Dr. Burkhart finishes her exam and sends the results to the lab. Maynard is to take the papers and xrays to the lab but bumps into Shorty Eggleston (Burt Mustin) and drops them. Shorty also had test results that he dropped and they get mixed up. Dr. Burkhart gets the results and it says Dobie's in perfect health for a man in his 80s. Everyone, including Dobie, believes he doesn't have long to live. Maynard talks to Posthumas J. Simpson (Howard McNear) and Moribund T. Simpson, Undertakers, to arrange things for Dobie. They think Maynard is the one the arrangements are for. After speaking to Shorty, Dr. Burkhart figures out the switch in the lab reports and realizes Dobie was lying.
120	9	"Flow Gently, Sweet Money"	Rod Amateau	Arnold Horwitt	November 21, 1962
Dobie has asked Linda Sue Faversham (Yvonne Craig) to marry him sixty-one times. She has turned him down each time. Linda Sue has to marry someone with money because she needs to be able to support her family. Everyone knows Dobie has no money. But surprisingly when Dobie proposes a 62nd time, she says yes. Linda Sue will have her money hungry little sister Amanda Jean try and find a rich husband. Linda Sue tells Amanda Jean to not fall in love with a poor guy as she did with Dobie. Despite never having spoken to her, Dunky is in love with Amanda Jean. It turns out Amanda Jean loves Dunky. Dobie has to stop this romance or Linda Sue will have to go back to looking for a rich guy. Linda Sue has tried talking Amanda Jean into dumping Dunky but it didn't work. Linda Sue and Dobie will try to mold Dunky into a cutthroat money maker. Dunky goes to work for a competing grocery store and Linda Sue gives him some tricks to get ahead. Dunky does things to sabotage Herbert's business. Dobie doesn't like the guy Dunky is turning into. Business is so bad that Herbert is selling the store. Even though he'll lose Linda Sue, Dobie gets Dunky to break it off with Amanda Jean. Things get weird when Linda Sue says she likes Dunky and Amanda Jean says she likes Dobie.
121	10	"Strictly for the Birds"	Guy Scarpitta	Arnold Horwitt	November 28, 1962
Maynard is on an operating table to have an appendix removed. But then the Doctor (Anthony Ray) realizes it had already been done years ago. Earlier, Dobie's latest object of affection is the very patriotic Betsy Dolly Martha Trueblood (Julie Parrish). She's not interested in him do to his lack of knowledge about American history. The only way Besty will go out with Dobie is if he enrolls and then passes Dr. Burkhart's American History class. Burkhart will reluctantly enroll both Dobie and Maynard in her class if they pass an entrance exam right now. Dobie comes up with a plan to teach a mynah bird the answers. They'll get out of taking the exam right now by Maynard pretending to have an Appendicitis attack. That's how Maynard wound up in the operating room. Afterwards, Dobie and Maynard go to the pet store and buy Arthur (Mel Blanc voice), the mynah bird. It's time for the exam and the boys have no trouble bringing Arthur along as Burkhart likes birds. Things go bad when Burkhart lets Arthur out the window for some fresh air. After she leaves, Maynard whistles for the bird and it returns. But for some reason, Arthur doesn't give the boys the answers. Suddenly, Maynard knows the answers. But it turns out they were all the wrong answers and Dobie flunks the test.
122	11	"The Iceman Goeth"	Rod Amateau	Max Shulman	December 5, 1962
Dobie shows us a picture of him and Herbert in the paper saying they're wanted for murder. Earlier, Herbert gets a letter from his oil geologist brother Timothy Gillis which says he'll be gone longer than he thought. Timothy says he would like to give Herbert a token of his appreciation for taking care of Dunky. Herbert tells Dobie that he thinks Timothy will give him some oil wells. Dunky and Maynard come by and Dunky holds the freezer door open for Herbert. Dunky is distracted talking on the phone and lets the freezer door close locking Herbert in. Dunky and Maynard forget about Herbert and leave. While the two are with Clarissa, they remember about Herbert. They go back to the store not knowing Herbert got out through a trap door. They believe they've killed Herbert. The two run into Police Officer Bloodhound Mulcahey (Richard Reeves) who says he's been promoted to homicide. They then go into hiding in a tunnel at the college. Several days later, Mulcahey suspects Herbert and Dobie have done away with Dunky so they would inherit some oil wells. Herbert and Dobie are arrested for murder and released on bond. A cold wave hits the town. The college turns on their coal burning furnace which puts smoke in the tunnel. Dunky and Maynard get out and pretend to be girls in Dr. Burkhart's home economics class. Herbert delivers flour to the class and finds Maynard and Dunky.
123	12	"Dr. Jerkell & Mr. Gillis"	Rod Amateau	Dean Riesner	December 12, 1962
In an homage to Dr. Jekyll & Mr. Hyde, Prof. Dartmoor is showing the class the brains of a criminal psychopath and a genius. He says the abnormal brain contains the chemical compound called LYC-13. Dartmoor has manufactured the chemical in liquid form. Given the right amount, it could also make a human a genius. Dobie is seeing a girl named Gloria Brownlee and she likes him because of his hair. Dean Hollister (Paul Tripp) tells Maynard he will be expelled from College unless he passes a comprehensive exam. Maynard asks Dobie to help him study. Dobie says only a genius could learn everything he needs before the test later. Maynard asks Dartmoor if he could have some of the LYC-13, but he says no. It's time for the test and Maynard sneaks a small drink of the formula. Maynard goes to see Dartmoor and Prof. Nastington (Howard McNear). They are impressed with how smart Maynard now is. The formula wears off and Maynard goes back and drinks a large amount of it. Maynard turns into a hairy monster and runs around frightening people. Dobie wants to find a way to help Maynard. Maynard goes to see Herbert and causes a lot of damage to the store. Dobie and Gloria seek Dartmoor's help in finding a cure. Maynard comes by and starts to destroy Dartmoor's lab. Dobie gives Maynard a cure to drink and it turns him into Prof. Nastington. They give Maynard a different cure which turns him into Herbert. The third cure turns him into a beautiful girl and Dobie leaves with her. Later, Maynard eats something that turns him back to normal.
124	13	"Will the Real Santa Claus Please Come Down the Chimmey?"	Rod Amateau	Arnold Horwitt	December 19, 1962
It's a few days away from Christmas and Winnie is not happy about it. A week earlier, the Gillis' learn that Maynard will be staying with them for the holiday. The family mentions some of the things they would like as gifts. They find out that Maynard still believes in Santa Claus. Maynard decides to be a Santa's helper and get the family the presents they want. Herbert learns that Duffy (Anthony Spinelli) is putting in a new washer and dryer, which is what Winnie wanted. There are other gifts and it costs Herbert hundreds of dollars to send stuff back and put the house back to the way it was. Dobie believes it's time that Maynard learned that Santa Claus doesn't really exist. Dobie wants to stage a scene were Santa Claus comes down the chimney and then exposes himself as a fraud. Herbert will be Santa. He practices going down the chimney and gets stuck. Herbert actually replaces the fireplace with a larger one. It's Christmas Eve and Dobie puts his plan into action. Maynard is excited to see Santa and he tells Santa all the gifts he originally wanted for the others. Maynard says he doesn't need anything because he has the best friends in the world. Herbert can't bring himself to hurt Maynard and agrees to get all the gifts he wanted. Maynard reveals that he knew it was Herbert all along. Herbert makes up for all the money he spent by charging other women to use Winnie's new washer and dryer. Bess Flowers as Woman in Line.
125	14	"Who Did William Tell?"	Rod Amateau	Arnold Horwitt	January 2, 1963
The Milano Opera Company comes to Pryor College to perform William Tell and are going through rehearsals. Maynard brings Dunky to the school auditorium thinking there was a beauty pageant there, but it's the opera. Alfredo Farino (Alejandro Rey), the Opera Director, asks them if they would like to make some money as extras in the opera. They are not interested. Then Dunky sees Rosa Cesara (Roxane Berard), the opera's diva, and instantly falls for her. Rosa is dating Alfredo and they have an argument. To get Alfredo jealous, Rosa gets Dunky a part in the opera. Rosa tells Dunky she loves him and wants to get married. Dunky goes and asks Dobie's advice. Dobie tries to use reverse psychology and tells Dunky he should get married. Thinking opera singers make no money, Dobie tries to bribe Rosa into dumping Dunky. When Dobie learns how much money Rosa actually makes, he's all for Dunky marrying her. Alfredo catches Dunky and Rosa kissing and he threatens Dunky. Thinking Alfredo is out of town, Dunky plans to elope with Rosa after the performance. Alfredo comes back early in the day and Maynard repeatedly interrupts rehearsal trying to warn Dunky. There's a small confrontation between Alfredo and Dunky and Rosa gets back with Alfredo. Ned Romero as Funcoli.
126	15	"Too Many Kooks Spoil the Broth"	Guy Scarpitta	Bud Nye	January 9, 1963
Dobie tells Maynard that he is in love with Cecily Atwater and she's crazy about him. Cousin Virgil T. Gillis returns for a visit on his way to Cleveland. Dobie still thinks Virgil is a nice guy, while Maynard knows he is a two-faced phony. Virgil hopes to marry into money while in Cleveland. Cecily comes by and meets Virgil. Her father is P.T. Atwater (Charles Lane) "The Kitchenware King". P.T. is the inventor of the Quickie Cooker. Cecily expects Dobie will take her father's executive training course so that he will become a wealthy businessman. Virgil has found his wealthy woman. He says he'll take the course as well so he can help Dobie, but he really has another plan. Virgil goes to see P.T. and starts to butter him up. Virgil finds a way to sabotage Dobie's first meeting with P.T. and Dobie is kicked out of the course. Cecily gets her father to give Dobie another chance. Virgil finds a way to be alone with Cecily and he bad mouth's Dobie. At the next class, Virgil again makes Dobie look bad. To get back in Atwater's and Cecily's good graces, Dobie plans to sell more Quickie Cookers than anyone else. Things don't go well for Dobie. Virgil, Cecily and Atwater go south to sell the Cookers.
127	16	"Vocal Boy Makes Good"	Rod Amateau	Dean Riesner	January 16, 1963
The pop trio The Lettermen are performing at the college. Behind the scenes, the band is having trouble with one member, Lou (Tony Butala). Herbert and Dobie are in the audience and everyone witnesses the band get into a fight on stage. Maynard would like to join the band. The band has a contract to perform at the college one more time. They need to find a replacement for Lou. They want to find someone who doesn't have an ego problem and can take orders. Dobie brings Maynard to the band, but they want to hire talent-less Dobie. Dobie feels bad that he stole the job from Maynard. Dobie gives Maynard a note to give to the band that says Dobie lost his voice. While going to see the band, Dobie meets April Boynton (Carol Christensen), the beautiful music critic for the school paper. She is happy to meet Dobie because he'll be singing with the band. When the band asks Dobie if he really lost his voice, he starts singing. Maynard is again disappointed with Dobie. During a rehearsal, Dobie is performing too much and the band puts a stop to it. Herbert thinks Dobie needs more publicity and April offers to help. Fame has gone to Dobie's head and the band is not happy about it. But because they have a contract to perform, there's nothing they can do. Maynard finds a way to sabotage Dobie's performance and Dobie apologizes to him. The Letterman get back together.
128	17	"All Right, Dobie, Drop the Gun"	Rod Amateau	Arnold Horwitt	January 23, 1963
Herbert and Winnie come back from seeing a gangster movie. Herbert says how he would handle things if a gangster tried to hold him captive. Suddenly there's a guy in the store with a gun and Herbert faints. Turns out the guy is escaped convict Clyde "Goon" Calhoun (Ralph Taeger). Clyde takes them upstairs where Dobie is and Dobie faints. Clyde calls Big Louie (Clegg Hoyt) and tells Louie to come and get him. The next morning, Clyde tells the Gillis' to open the store and have business as usual. Dobie is locked in the closet upstairs. Winnie suggests to Herbert that they offer Clyde money to leave. A woman comes in the store and Herbert tries to tell her to get the police. She is Patsy (Joyce Jameson), Clyde's gun moll. Maynard comes by and things get confusing with Clyde. Herbert and Dobie try to talk each other into jumping Clyde, but both are too afraid. Winnie puts a sedative in Clyde's food, but Maynard winds up eating it and passes out. Clyde makes Herbert eat the rest and he passes out. Herbert will try and sweet talk Patsy into double-crossing Clyde, but that doesn't work. Thanks to Maynard and his petrified frog, Herbert gets Clyde's gun and Winnie calls the police. Clyde gets his gun back. The police arrive and there's a shoot out between them and Clyde. Maynard causes some confusion and Clyde is captured. The next day Big Louie arrives and thanks to Maynard, he is captured as well.
129	18	"And Now a Word from Our Sponsor"	Rod Amateau	Arnold Horwitt	January 30, 1963
Dobie is asking Dr. Burkhart whether or not she has picked him to be the disc jockey for the college radio station. Burkhart asks him how he stands on the subject of payola, excepting money to play certain records. When he says he would never do that, Burkhart gives him the job. Meanwhile, Ma Baker (Alice Pearce) wants her ex-con son Eddie Baker (Lennie Weinrib) to get involved in another payola scheme. He says he promised the Warden that he'd go straight. Ma Baker says that folk music is very big. Ma brings in their old friend Fifi LaVerne (Carole Cook) who will pose as folksinger Prudence Virtue. They'll take Prudence's record to college disc jockey's. To gain Dobie's attention, Zelda tells him that she can become a singing sensation. Zelda gets Maynard to help her stage a flashy picture for her album cover and to record a song. After Dobie sees the sexy picture of Zelda on the album cover, he agrees to play her record. Eddie tries to talk Dobie into playing Prudence's record and then gives him a lot of money. Dobie agrees to play the record that night. Eddie gets mad when Dobie plays Zelda's record and he goes to the radio station to confront Dobie. Dobie locks the door and then announces this will be his last broadcast. He tells the audience that he accepted a bribe to play a record from Eddie Baker. Burkhart and a Police Officer come by and arrest Eddie. After Maynard breaks the turntable, Zelda and Prudence both grab the microphone and each start singing their song at the same time. Zelda and Prudence record their songs sung together and believe it will be a hit.
130	19	"Two for the Whipsaw"	David Davis	Bud Nye	February 6, 1963
Chatsworth offers Dobie $200 to impersonate him at a stuffy dinner party. Old friend of the family, wealthy Nicholas J. Vanderfeller (Roy Roberts), will be visiting with his daughter Cynthia (Maggie Pierce). He tells Dobie that the last time he saw the Vanderfellers is when he was very young. Chatsworth remembers Cynthia wasn't very good looking back then. Chatsworth has rented the exclusive penthouse suite at the Peabody Hotel for the occasion. It's the night of the party and Dobie arrives with Maynard as his valet. Cynthia shows up and she is beautiful. Dobie falls for her right away. Chatsworth comes by to make sure things are going well. He sees Cynthia and now wants to join the party. Dobie manages to get rid of him. Meanwhile, it turns out that Nicholas has no money. He will try and hypnotize "Chatsworth" into marrying Cynthia to gain access to the Osbourne fortune. Chatsworth does get in, but Maynard kicks him out. Dobie says that he was just a local eccentric. Nicholas hypnotizes Dobie and inadvertently Maynard. Dobie is taken by helicopter to an awaiting boat. Captain Lopez starts the wedding ceremony. Maynard awakens and goes to get Herbert. They get to the boat and Herbert says that is his son. Chatsworth shows up and is eventually able to prove who he is and that the Vanderfeller's are fortune hunters. Nicholas and Cynthia jump off the boat. Roger Til as Pierre.
131	20	"The Moon and No Pence"	Rod Amateau	Bud Nye	February 13, 1963
Dobie is in love with Roberta, but she just broke up with him. He is also on the verge of being expelled from college due to his poor grades. Zelda offers to help him improve his grades and then guide him to the top of the corporate ladder after he graduates. Herbert would just like Dobie to join him in running the grocery store. But after reviewing the long hours for the little money that he makes, Herbert tells Dobie to let Zelda help him. Dobie tells Zelda he won't even look at another girl, but then he sees a Russian beauty named Anastasia Dimitrov. Anastasia loves the arts and somehow believes Dobie does as well. Being a transfer student, Anastasia will soon be leaving Pryor to travel the world from one artistic venture to another. She would like Dobie to go with her, but he would need to improve his grades so he can graduate. Dobie goes to Zelda for help. Anastasia wants Dobie to dance barefoot with her in the moonlight. Maynard sees them and somehow thinks Dobie is under the spell of a witch. He gets the Gillis' and Zelda and brings them to where Dobie is dancing. Winnie likes the dancing and her, Zelda and Herbert join Dobie and Anastasia. They are apparently trespassing on Mr. Vincent's property and he has them arrested. At the police station, Mr. Vincent decides to drop the charges. But Winnie and Anastasia want to be able to continue dancing at that place and they all wind up in jail. Days later, Zelda had Dobie set up with a corporate interview. It turns out to be with Mr. Vincent and Dobie leaves.
132	21	"The Beast with Twenty Fingers"	Rod Amateau	Arnold Horwitt	February 20, 1963
Herbert is practicing a speech for the Grocers Convention should he be named grocer of the year. Maynard and Herbert's pinkies become entrapped in a Gypsy love link bought from a novelty-selling Gypsy. They try several different ways to get separated but none work. Figuring that the Gypsy would know how to get separated, Dobie goes out in search of him. Mrs. Fogarty comes to the store to complain about the meat Herbert sold her. Herbert tries to hide, but being stuck to Maynard makes that impossible. Dobie finds the Gypsy camp and the beautiful Natasha. Dobie wants to talk to her father about the love link. Natasha thinks he might be there for another reason. She keeps kissing him in hopes of finding out what it is. Dobie enjoys the kissing and forgets why he was looking for the Gypsies. The next day Herbert wonders where Dobie is. It's getting close to convention time. Herbert has Maynard shave his beard and dress up as a woman so he can pose as Winnie. At the convention, Herbert's old friend Molly O'Day (Carole Cook) would like to meet his wife. Meanwhile, Dobie is still kssing Natasha. Molly announces the Grocer of the Year and it isn't Herbert. Outside, Maynard and Herbert trip and are separated. Maynard reconnects them. Dobie finally comes home and is able to free Maynard and Herbert. But the three get tangled up in a set of rings. Albert Cavens as Party Guest. Bess Flowers as Party Guest.
133	22	"Thanks for the Memory"	Rod Amateau	Max Shulman	February 27, 1963
After the countless times Zelda has tried to make Dobie hers, he finally gives in. Dobie is stunned when Zelda turns him down. Dr. Burkhart is trying to get class started but Dobie and Zelda are interrupting. Zelda says she's finally realized that Dobie will always be a dead weight that she will have to pull along. Zelda tells Dobie he's just too dumb for her. Suddenly a beautiful girl comes in the room and introduces herself as Claypool. She just came to town because her father's business keeps them moving a lot. He makes a lot of money building bridges. After class, Claypool tells Dobie that he may go steady with her. Now Zelda wants Dobie back and Dobie picks her. Dobie confesses to Maynard that he doesn't love Zelda, but she can help him through life. Zelda wants to teach Dobie how to think. It doesn't go well and Zelda leaves Dobie again. Claypool agrees to take Dobie and she wants to meet his parents. Claypool arrives at the grocery store riding a small elephant. Zelda wants Dobie back. He's tired of the back and forth and is staying with Claypool. But then he picks Zelda. After they decide to just be friends, Dobie goes back to Claypool, but she has now picked Maynard. Claypool moves away. Maynard and the elephant move in with the Gillis'. Note: A remake of "Love is a Fallacy" from season one.
134	23	"Three Million Coins in the Fountain"	Rod Amateau	Joel Kane	March 6, 1963
Clarissa Osborne tells Chatsworth that their entire fortune of $30 million has been wiped out. Chatsworth pressures Maynard and Dunky into raising money for a needy family in town. He won't say who the family is. Chatsworth gives Maynard a Charity Wishing Well stand to collect the money. The money collecting is going very well. Dr. Burkhart brings money collected from the faculty. She says the Dean is running a raffle with the proceeds to be given to the charity. When Dobie learns what Maynard is doing and that Chatsworth is behind it, he becomes very suspicious. Dobie, Dr. Burkhart and Herbert bring Chatsworth to see Clarissa. They question Chatsworth's motives and don't believe there is a needy family. They are surprised to learn that the Osbournes are the family. They won't pursue the matter if Chatsworth gives back all the money. Herbert also wants the $16 he spent for the paint for the signs that were put up. To pay Herbert, Clarissa says she'll take a job as the Gillis' maid and Chatsworth will be the butler. Clarissa orders new appliances for the kitchen and hires a chef. Then she gets other fancy things. Herbert realizes he'll have to pay for everything and it's more trouble then it's worth. Mr. Nichols (Richard Clair), a tax assessor, comes by and Herbert tries to make things look poor. When Nichols sees all the fancy items and a maid and butler, he raises Herbert's taxes. Clarissa learns that an investment came through and she now has $35 million. Eddie Applegate as Walter Funk. Note: Final appearance of Bobby Diamond as Duncan "Dunky" Gillis.
135	24	"Beethoven, Presley, and Me"	Guy Scarpitta	Dean Riesner	March 13, 1963
Charlie Wayzack (Charles Lane), a music publisher, tells Sally O'Malley, a campus disc jokey, about the abilities of a hit-song-analyzing robot named Arnold (Robby the Robot). Maynard comes in the office and introduces Virgil T. Gillis. Virgil sings one of his southern-fried songs for Charlie. Arnold didn't like the song. Earlier, Virgil gets a job in town and Maynard still thinks he's a fink. Virgil took a job getting shot out of a canon at the local carnival. But it's not long before he's fired. He now wants to become a big song writer. Virgil talks Herbert into lending him money and Maynard into being his road crew. Now back in Charlie's office. Arnold has just said Virgil's song was a flop. Maynard monkeys with Arnold and is transformed into a robot with all of Arnold's abilities. Maynard is back at the grocery store. Herbert hopes to make a fortune with Maynard picking hit songs. Herbert and Virgil show Sally how Maynard helps Virgil make his songs better. Virgil winds up with a bunch of hit records. But then Maynard loses his hit selecting abilities and returns to normal.
136	25	"The Little Chimp That Couldn't"	Stanley Z. Cherry	Arnold Horwitt	March 20, 1963
Dean Hollister (Addison Richards) visits Dr. Burkhart's Psychology class. They have been training chimpanzees to do simple tasks. One chimpanzee who isn't learning well is Seymour and Burkhart wants to hide him from Hollister. Hollister wants to know why Seymour is being hidden. The school has spent considerable money on these chimps and Hollister is beginning to wonder if it's worth it. To recoupe some money, Hollister wants to send Seymour to the medical research wing. Hollister will give Maynard, Burkhart's chimpanzee handler, one week to teach Seymour something of value. Maynard asks Herbert if he and Seymour can stay at the Gillis household and Winnie gets Herbert to say yes. Maynard is working with Seymour constantly, but is making no progress. Maynard decides to paint a picture and claim that Seymour did it. Hollister doesn't believe the chimp painted the picture, but Burkhart says that Maynard never lies. Hollister wants Seymour to paint something else. Maynard paints another picture, but Hollister is sure Maynard did it. Hollister wants to see Seymour paint in front of him. When the chimp doesn't, Hollister threatens to fire Burkhart and expel Maynard. Suddenly Seymour starts to paint and does a copy of Whistler's Mother. Hollister will Seymour stay in Burkhart's class. Hollister does believe it was just a one time thing, but then Seymour paints Washington's crossing of the Delaware. Seymour paints several more reproductions, but then loses the talent. Seymour starts playing the piano.
137	26	"There's Always Room for One Less"	Tom Montgomery	Bud Nye	March 27, 1963
Having done some things to embarrass the Osbourne name, Clarissa throws Chatsworth out of the house. Herbert offers to take Chatsworth in. He figures that in a couple days Clarissa will want Chatsworth back. Herbert hopes she will then throw all her grocery business to him for taking care of Chatsworth. Once Chatsworth moves in, he starts giving orders that the family happily follows. Things get very expensive and Chatsworth even has his polo pony move in. Herbert finds a way to talk Chatsworth into going home. Meanwhile, Clarissa is missing her son and she tries to get him out of her mind. Chatsworth arrives home and at first Clarissa thinks she's imagining it. After the happy reunion, something goes wrong and Clarissa kicks him out again. Herbert goes to see Clarissa and tells her how much money he has spent on Chatsworth. She throws Herbert out. Chatsworth comes back to the Gillis home. He tells Dobie he will send Dobie's parents on a vacation. Chatsworth goes to see his butler Tremblay and blackmails him for some money. Back at the Gillis house, Chatsworth and Dobie print up some thank you cards for Herbert and Winnie. Herbert and Maynard think they're printing up money. Maynard tells Clarissa about the money printing and she comes to the Gillis home. Herbert and Maynard start tearing up the money. Herbert finds out about the money being real and tries to put the bills back together.
138	27	"The General Cried at Dawn"	David Davis	Bud Nye	April 3, 1963
Dobie and Maynard go vacationing in the banana republic of Boca Dolce. Once there, Dobie is not pleased and feels they are being watched. They are in fact being watched by Hernandez (Pepe Hern) and Guadalupe Rubero. Dobie thinks the place is ugly until he sees Guadalupe. She wants nothing to do with Dobie and is interested in Maynard. She leads them to a place where Hernandez knocks both of them out. They are taken to President Carlos Rubero. They are told that the person who really runs the country is General Ramon, a fearless leader known as El Tigre. Maynard is the exact look-alike for Ramon. Carlos would like Maynard to impersonate Ramon in public, despite the danger. If Maynard refuses, he and Dobie will face a firing squad. Two men come in and abduct Dobie and the real Ramon. Maynard will have to fill in at a boarder meeting to sign a treaty with the evil dictator Zapatero (Rodolfo Hoyos Jr.). Meanwhile, Zapatero tells Cpl. Gonzales (Al Checco) that he wants to take over Boca Dolce. Despite having Ramon as a prisoner, Zapatero hears that Ramon is coming to sign the treaty. Rubero, Guadalupe and Maynard arrive. Before the treaty can be signed, the real Ramon and Dobie are brought out. They are all locked up. The next morning the prisoners are brought before a firing squad. Dobie had a plan and they are able to escape.
139	28	"Now I Lay Me Down to Steal"	Guy Scarpitta	Arnold Horwitt	April 10, 1963
Herbert, Dobie and Maynard are delivering some groceries to Osborne Manor. Dobie sees Alicia Osborne, Mrs. Osborne's niece, and is instantly in love. Alicia apparently falls for Dobie right away. She asks Dobie to kiss her and as he does, Clarissa breaks them up and wants Dobie to leave. Alicia insists that Dobie stay the weekend or she'll tell her father. Clarissa reluctantly allows Dobie, Maynard and Herbert to stay. However, she warns there will be trouble if anything goes wrong during the weekend. During the day, Herbert is constantly watching Maynard so he doesn't break anything. Dobie and Alicia are spending some time in the moonlight when Dobie sees Maynard sleepwalking. Back in the bedroom, Herbert tells Maynard that he was sleepwalking and he will ruin everything. Clarissa gathers everyone and says her diamond necklace was taken from her wall safe. Clarissa suspects Maynard. Herbert ties Maynard to his bed. Sleepwalking Maynard frees himself and Dobie again sees him while he's trying to be with Alicia. Maynard comes back to the bedroom and ties himself up. Some more of Clarissa's jewelry has been taken. Officer Casper (Willard Waterman) and Officer Luke Feldon (Herbie Faye) arrive to investigate. Maynard again wanders off with Herbert trying to follow him. The police catch Herbert and he lets it slip that Maynard may have taken the jewels. While interrogating Maynard, the Police see Clarissa walk by in her sleep and take more jewels out of the safe.
140	29	"Lassie, Get Lost"	Rod Amateau	Dean Riesner	April 17, 1963
Hollywood teen sensation Valentine Van Loon broadcasts a plea for the return of her lost dog Boo Boo. There will be a $500 reward. Dobie would like to find the dog for romantic reasons, while Herbert wants the money. Maynard has found the dog and Dobie wants to be able to get the credit. He goes to see Speed Pulitzer (Joyce Van Patten), Valetine's press agent. Dobie tells Valentine that he has found her dog and she kisses him. Speed comes up with a publicity stunt where Dobie and Valentine become a romantic couple. Dobie is to come back with the dog at a certain time and Speed will have a camera crew waiting. Back at the grocery store, Dobie tries to get the dog from Maynard. He doesn't want Maynard to know the dog belongs to Valentine. They have to hide the dog because Herbert is coming. Herbert finds the dog. To prevent Herbert from returning the dog, Dobie gets Herbert into the freezer. He tells Maynard to leave with the dog. Turns out the dog they thought was Boo Boo really wasn't. Somehow Maynard returns the real Boo Boo and gets the reward. Dobie loses out on the romance. Albert Cavens as Reporter.
141	30	"The Rice and Old Shoes Caper"	Rod Amateau	Arnold Horwitt	April 24, 1963
Dobie tells us how Maynard and Zelda came to be standing in front of the Justice of the Peace (Burt Mustin) getting married. At Zelda's 21st birthday party, she mentions how she would like to marry Dobie. Dobie is still not interested. Zelda says she has a plan to use Maynard to get Dobie to marry her. Maynard loves his freedom and Dobie wouldn't let that be taken away from him. If Zelda gets Maynard to propose to her, Dobie would have to step in to save him. Zelda finds a way to talk Maynard into proposing to her, not letting him know her real plan. Dobie tries to talk Maynard out of marrying Zelda. But Maynard now sees marrying Zelda as the best thing for him. Dobie can't break his heart by telling him Zelda's real plan. Even Winnie and Herbert can't find a way to get Maynard to change his mind. Zelda buys a wedding dress and has a bridal shower. It's the day of the wedding and the ceremony is starting. Dobie tries to stop the wedding, but it's Zelda that finally admits she tricked Maynard. Maynard still wants to get married. But then he changes his mind because he knows Zelda will always be wishing it was someone else. Zelda wants to continue the ceremony because she wants someone to take care of. The Justice of the Peace realizes the two aren't meant for each other and stops the ceremony. Linda Henning as Elsa. Note: Final appearance of Shiela James as Zelda Gilroy.
142	31	"Requiem for an Underweight Heavyweight"	Rod Amateau	Arnold Horwitt	May 1, 1963
Maynard is in a boxing ring with heavyweight champion and undefeated Rocky Feroni. Dobie explains that it all started in Dr. Burkhart's biology class. The Air Force has given her the assignment of testing some new energy pills on mice. The pills contain the concentrated essence of the Galapagos Island turtle. After class, Burkhart wants Maynard to feed one pill to each of the mice. Maynard winds up eating several pills and suddenly has super strength. When Dobie finds out what Maynard did, he asks Herbert's advice. Herbert wants to make a lot of money by having Maynard become a boxer. Peace loving Maynard doesn't want to hit people, but Herbert finds a way to trigger him. Herbert becomes Maynard's manager and has him go a round with a boxer (Chuck Hicks). Maynard knocks him out after being triggered. Herbert and Maynard start crossing the country and winning fights. "Killer Krebs" is to fight Rocky Feroni next. Rocky and his girlfriend, Lola Laverne (Joyce Jameson), figure that Maynard must have a secret weapon. Lola decides to seduce the information out of Maynard. Maynard tells Lola about the pills he's taking. While he's out of the room, she grabs them and leaves. It's the night of the fight and Herbert finds out that Rocky has the pills. Herbert gets a telegram from Burkhart saying the pills have a certain shelf life and anyone taking them now will collapse. Maynard avoids Rocky long enough for the pills to weaken him. But both guys wind up getting hit and are knocked out. The Referee (John Indrisano) counts Maynard out first and he loses.
143	32	"I Was a Spy for the F.O.B."	Tom Montgomery	Bud Nye	May 8, 1963
The Gillises and Maynard are on vacation in Washington DC. Foreign spies Bruno (Henry Corden) and Veronica Vanderheit (Barbara Bain) see Maynard and believe him to be the famous rocket scientist Dr. Henry Fahrenheit. Bruno wants Veronica to romance Maynard and get the top secret formula for his rocket fuel. Veronica starts to flirt with Maynard and Dobie is interested in her. Dobie allows Veronica to think Maynard is Fahrenheit, which will give Dobie time to win her over. Dobie claims to be Henry's assistant and Henry can go nowhere without him. Federal Agent A.F. Bottomly (Linden Chiles) tells Dobie and Maynard that Veronica is a spy and will kill to get what she wants. Bottomly wants Maynard to continue posing as Fahrenheit so they can capture the rest of the spy ring. Bottomly and Agent T.F. Elliott (Joseph Hoover) get Maynard to invite Veronica up to his room for dinner. Bruno gives Veronica a powder to drug Maynard with so they can take him to headquarters. Herbert and Winnie come into the room and Dobie needs to get rid of them. Veronica shows up and the Gillises leave, but they return later dressed as room service and bring food. Dobie gets his parents into the room where the Agents were listening from. Dobie tries to tell them about the Agents, but his parents think they are there to help the woman black-mail Maynard. Veronica drugs Maynards drink and the two keep switching the glasses around. Maynard does drink the drugged glass. Bruno and the Chief (John Banner) come in the room and carry Maynard out. In the hotel lobby, a dazed Maynard wanders off and the spies try to capture him. Dobie and the Agents show up and are able to overpower Bruno and the Chief. With Maynards help, Veronica is also caught. The spies learn that Maynard is not Fahrenheit.
144	33	"There's a Broken Light for Every Broken Heart on Broadway"	David Davis	Joel Kane	May 15, 1963
Kitty Fontaine is performing at the Tip Top Club and Maynard is in the band. It all started when Maynard is in the same Music Appreciation class as singer Emily Klauber. Maynard wants to be her manager. He gets Eddie Ringding to be Emily's singing teacher. Maynard makes Emily practice really hard. Maynard has Emily audition for Club owner Joe Ziegfreld and he hires her. Joe gives her the stage name Kitty Fontaine. Kitty becomes a singing sensation and Maynard books her all over the country. Booking agent Freddy J. Quick (Linden Chiles) tells Kitty she needs to dump Maynard and sign with his agency. Freddy claims he can make her a huge star. Kitty wants nothing to do with Freddy and kicks him out. Maynard overheard the whole conversation. He wants what's best for Kitty and puts on a show saying he's quiting. Kitty begs Maynard to stay but he leaves. After signing with Freddy, Kitty becomes an even bigger star. Kitty is to sing in the biggest club in the country, the Tip Top Club. She tells Freddy she just doesn't feel right and won't perform. Kitty calls Dobie and she wants him to get Maynard to come to the club. Maynard has been trying to forget Kitty by over eating and he's gained a lot of weight. But Dobie says Kitty needs him and talks Maynard into going. Kitty gets on stage and has a hard time singing. Suddenly she sees Maynard in the band and then gives a great performance. Earl Hammond as Nightclub Manager.
145	34	"Beauty Is Only Kin Deep"	Rod Amateau	Bud Nye	May 22, 1963
Despite only knowing each other for one day, Dobie and Nancy Sue (Susan Watson) love each other. Dobie asks her to marry him and she says yes. The only problem is, because she comes from a very traditional family, she can't get married until her older sister does. Turns out her older sister is plain looking Dr. Imogene Burkhart. Nancy Sue tells the Gillis' that Imogene has a boyfriend. He's a CPA and his name is Clinton Hardwell (Douglas Dick). Clinton and Imogene have been going together for 12 years. The problem is getting him to propose. Imogene agrees to let Herbert and Winnie make her over because she wants to get married. They actually get Imogene to look quite beautiful. Clinton comes by, and despite Imogene doing her best to be sexy, he's his usual meek self. Herbert suggests getting a fake boyfriend to make Clinton jealous. Herbert pays his handsome milkman Casimir H. Prohosky Jr. (Peter Lupus) to fill in the role. The next night, Imogene tells Clinton about Casimir and how he has proposed several times to her. Imogene says that Casimir is coming over again. Dobie gets a call from Casimir saying he can't make it. Dobie fills in and pretends he's Casimir. Clinton starts to see Imogene in a different light. But then Herbert comes in pretending to be Casimir, followed by Maynard. The real Casimir shows up. Clinton wants to know what's going on. Casimir actually falls for Imogene and she agrees to go out with him. Imogene now wants to play the field and Nancy Sue does also.
146	35	"The Call of the, Like, Wild"	Guy Scarpitta	Dean Riesner	May 29, 1963
At the premiere of a new movie, Zedda Parsnips (Mary Jackson) interviews the star Gina Lollolasagna (Susan Bay Nimoy). Zedda then speaks to the other star, Maynard. It all started in Professor Guildenstern's (Jack Raine) biology class. They are discussing the wild Musk Ox and how it attracts a female. After class, Maynard accidentally switches his hair tonic for the bottle of Musk Ox oil. Dobie is spending time with his latest love, Amelia (Sally Kellerman). Amelia suddenly smells something that really arouses her. Maynard shows up and Amelia is drawn to him and kisses him. Girls everywhere are now chasing Maynard. A bride at the altar chases Maynard. Even Winnie is attracted to him. Hoping to make money off of Maynard, Herbert wants to make him the next Hollywood heartthrob. Herbert, Dobie and Maynard go to Hollywood to see studio executive R.J. Crumley (Howard Caine). Crumley is not interested in Maynard until leading lady Gina Lollolasagna gets near Maynard. She now wants Maynard to be the leading man in her next movie. At the premiere, the movie is a flop and everyone sees that Maynard can't act. Maynard breaks the bottle of Musk Ox oil and they never figure out that was what attracted the women.
147	36	"The Devil and Dobie Gillis"	Guy Scarpitta	Story by : Max Shulman; Teleplay by : Bud Nye	June 5, 1963
The Osbornes are holding their annual two-day charity bazaar. Dobie and Maynard volunteer to help with things. Being short of funds, Chatsworth approaches Dobie with a scheme to get some money. Because it would be dishonest, Dobie isn't interested. But then Dobie meets Chatsworth's beautiful cousin, Pamela Osborne (Barbara Babcock) and the two immediately like each other. Chatsworth tells Dobie he'll need a lot of money to take Pamela out. Against his better judgement, Dobie accepts an offer of $50 from Chatsworth. Dobie spends the first day of the bazaar with Pamela. But thanks to Chatsworth, Dobie squanders all of the $50. Pamela talks all about the expensive things she wants to do on the 2nd day of the bazaar. Chatsworth approaches Dobie with a scheme to rig the raffle at the bazaar and split the $5000 prize. Because he already owes Chatsworth and he needs more money for Pamela, Dobie feels he has no choice. Dobie has a fantasy about a future where he and Pamela have a lot of money from all the crooked schemes he's pulled. Herbert and Winnie want nothing to do with their thieving son. Chatsworth, as the Devil, comes to claim Dobie's soul. Back to reality, the number Dobie is holding is called in the raffle. Knowing that it was rigged, Dobie doesn't respond. Pamela is stunned that Dobie is throwing away the money. Another number is called and Pamela leaves him. Dobie learns that Maynard detained Chatsworth and his number was legitimately called. Grandon Rhodes as Auctioneer. Note: A remake of the pilot, "Caper at the Bijou".
