= List of The Many Loves of Dobie Gillis episodes =

This is a list of episodes from the CBS television comedy The Many Loves of Dobie Gillis. The first episode aired on September 29, 1959, and the final episode aired on June 5, 1963. There were 147 episodes in total.

== Series overview ==
| Season | Episodes | Originally released | | Rank/Rating |
| Season | Episodes | First released | Last released | Rank/Rating |
|---|---|---|---|---|
| 1 | 39 | September 29, 1959 | July 5, 1960 | Not in Top 30 |
| 2 | 36 | September 27, 1960 | June 27, 1961 | 23/23.0 |
| 3 | 36 | October 10, 1961 | June 26, 1962 | 21/22.9 |
| 4 | 36 | September 26, 1962 | June 5, 1963 | Not in Top 30 |

== Episodes ==
=== Season 1 (1959–60) ===
| No. overall | No. in season | Title | Directed by | Written by | Original release date | Prod. code |
|---|---|---|---|---|---|---|
| 1 | 1 | "Caper at The Bijou" | Rod Amateau | Max Shulman | September 29, 1959 | 3301/3401 |
| 2 | 2 | "The Best Dressed Man" | Rod Amateau | Max Shulman | October 6, 1959 | 3403 |
| 3 | 3 | "Love Is a Science" | Rod Amateau | Max Shulman | October 13, 1959 | 3406 |
| 4 | 4 | "The Right Triangle" | Rod Amateau | Ben Starr | October 20, 1959 | 3415 |
| 5 | 5 | "Maynard's Farewell to the Troops" | Rod Amateau | Max Shulman & Rod Amateau | November 3, 1959 | 3405 |
| 6 | 6 | "The Sweet Singer of Central High" | Rod Amateau | Story by: Charles R. Marion; Teleplay by: Charles R. Marion & Ray Allen | November 10, 1959 | 3408 |
| 7 | 7 | "Greater Love Hath No Man" | Rod Amateau | Joel Kane & Jack Lloyd | November 17, 1959 | 3411 |
| 8 | 8 | "The Old Goat" | Rod Amateau | Fred S. Fox & Izzy Elinson | November 24, 1959 | 3414 |
| 9 | 9 | "Dobie Gillis - Boy Actor" | Ralph Francis Murphy | Dean Riesner | December 1, 1959 | 3409 |
| 10 | 10 | "It Takes Two" | Rod Amateau | Max Shulman | December 8, 1959 | 3402 |
| 11 | 11 | "Dobie's Birthday Party" | Rod Amateau | Ed James | December 15, 1959 | 3410 |
| 12 | 12 | "Deck The Halls" | Rod Amateau | Ray Allen | December 22, 1959 | 3416 |
| 13 | 13 | "Couchville, U.S.A." | Rod Amateau | Irving Brecher | December 29, 1959 | 3407 |
| 14 | 14 | "The Gaucho" | Rod Amateau | Fred S. Fox & Izzy Elinson | January 5, 1960 | 3413 |
| 15 | 15 | "The Smoke-Filled Room" | Rod Amateau | Teleplay by: Ray Allen, Max Shulman & Bernie Gould; Story by: Bernie Gould | January 12, 1960 | 3420 |
| 16 | 16 | "The Fist Fighter" | Ralph Francis Murphy | John Kohn & Mel Diamond | January 19, 1960 | 3419 |
| 17 | 17 | "The Hunger Strike" | Rod Amateau | Teleplay by: Ben Starr & Ray Allen; Story by: Ben Star | January 26, 1960 | 3423 |
| 18 | 18 | "The Flying Millicans" | Ralph Francis Murphy | Ray Allen | February 2, 1960 | 3417 |
| 19 | 19 | "Room at the Bottom" | Rod Amateau | Max Shulman | February 9, 1960 | 3422 |
| 20 | 20 | "The Power of Positive Thinking" | Rod Amateau | Louella MacFarland | February 16, 1960 | 3421 |
| 21 | 21 | "Dobie Spreads a Rumor" | Rod Amateau | Story by: George Beck; Teleplay by: George Beck & Max Shulman | February 23, 1960 | 3426 |
| 22 | 22 | "Love Is a Fallacy" | Rod Amateau | Max Shulman | March 1, 1960 | 3425 |
| 23 | 23 | "The Chicken From Outer Space" | Rod Amateau | Max Shulman | March 8, 1960 | 3428 |
| 24 | 24 | "Dobie's Navy Blues" | Rod Amateau | Story by: Terry Ryan & Robert Van Scoyk; Teleplay by: Terry Ryan, Robert Van Scoyk & Ray Allen | March 15, 1960 | 3429 |
| 25 | 25 | "Taken to the Cleaners" | Ralph Francis Murphy | Story by: Ray Allen; Teleplay by: Ray Allen & Max Shulman | March 29, 1960 | 3424 |
| 26 | 26 | "That's Show Biz" | Rod Amateau | Max Shulman | April 5, 1960 | 3430 |
| 27 | 27 | "The Prettiest Collateral in Town" | Rod Amateau | Story by : Jerry Davis; Teleplay by : Joel Kane | April 12, 1960 | 3432 |
| 28 | 28 | "Live Alone and Like It" | Guy Scarpitta | Story by: Sumner Long; Teleplay by: Joel Kane & Sumner Long | April 19, 1960 | 3431 |
| 29 | 29 | "The Big Sandwich" | Rod Amateau | Ray Allen & Ben Gershman | April 26, 1960 | 3404 |
| 30 | 30 | "Soup and Fish" | Rod Amateau | Teleplay by: Phil Davis & Joel Kane; Story by: Phil Davis | May 3, 1960 | 3433 |
| 31 | 31 | "Where There's a Will" | Rod Amateau | Ray Allen | May 10, 1960 | 3434 |
| 32 | 32 | "Put Your Feet In Our Hands" | Robert Butler | Story by : Nord Riley; Teleplay by : Joel Kane | May 17, 1960 | 3435 |
| 33 | 33 | "Competition Is the Life of Trade" | Robert Gordon | Dick Conway, Roland MacLane & Joel Kane | May 24, 1960 | 3436 |
| 34 | 34 | "The French, They Are a Funny Race" | Rod Amateau | Story by : Harvey Helm & Bernard Drew; Teleplay by : Joel Kane | May 31, 1960 | 3437 |
| 35 | 35 | "The Unregistered Nurse" | H. Bruce Humberstone | Phil Davis | June 7, 1960 | 3412 |
| 36 | 36 | "The Long Arm of the Law" | Guy Scarpitta | Lee Karson & Joel Kane | June 14, 1960 | 3438 |
| 37 | 37 | "Here Comes the Groom" | Rod Amateau | Story by : George Beck; Teleplay by : Joel Kane & Max Shulman | June 21, 1960 | 3439 |
| 38 | 38 | "A Taste for Lobster" | Rod Amateau | Arnold Horwitt | June 28, 1960 | 3418 |
| 39 | 39 | "Rock-A-Bye Dobie" | Rod Amateau | Ray Allen | July 5, 1960 | 3427 |

=== Season 2 (1960–61) ===
| No. overall | No. in season | Title | Directed by | Written by | Original release date | Prod. code |
|---|---|---|---|---|---|---|
| 40 | 1 | "Who Needs Elvis?" | Rod Amateau | Max Shulman | September 27, 1960 | 4401 |
| 41 | 2 | "You Ain't Nothin' But a Houn' Dog" | Rod Amateau | Lawrence Williams & Maggie Williams | October 4, 1960 | 4402 |
| 42 | 3 | "Baby Talk" | Rod Amateau | Joel Kane | October 18, 1960 | 4405 |
| 43 | 4 | "Dobie Goes Beatnik" | Guy Scarpitta | Joel Kane | October 25, 1960 | 4404 |
| 44 | 5 | "The Mystic Powers of Maynard G. Krebs" | Rod Amateau | Max Shulman | November 1, 1960 | 4406 |
| 45 | 6 | "The Face That Stopped the Clock" | Rod Amateau | Story by : Max Shulman; Teleplay by : Fred S. Fox & Iz Elinson | November 15, 1960 | 4412 |
| 46 | 7 | "Maynard G. Krebs - Boy Millionaire" | Rod Amateau | Joel Kane | November 22, 1960 | 4408 |
| 47 | 8 | "Around My Room in 80 Days" | Rod Amateau | Lawrence Williams, Maggie Williams & Max Shulman | November 29, 1960 | 4407 |
| 48 | 9 | "Drag Strip Dobie" | Rod Amateau | Bud Nye & Joel Kane | December 6, 1960 | 4409 |
| 49 | 10 | "Jangle Bells" | Rod Amateau | Lawrence Williams, Maggie Williams & Joel Kane | December 20, 1960 | 4413 |
| 50 | 11 | "Parlez-Vous English?" | Guy Scarpitta | Max Shulman | December 27, 1960 | 4414 |
| 51 | 12 | "The Day the Teachers Disappeared" | Rod Amateau | Story by : Rod Amateau; Teleplay by : Dean Riesner | January 3, 1961 | 4411 |
| 52 | 13 | "What's My Lion?" | Robert Gordon | Story by : Rod Amateau; Teleplay by : Dean Riesner | January 10, 1961 | 4410 |
| 53 | 14 | "The Big Question" | Rod Amateau | Max Shulman & Joel Kane | January 24, 1961 | 4417 |
| 54 | 15 | "Have You Stopped Beating Your Wife?" | Robert Gordon | Story by : Rod Amateau; Teleplay by : Ray Allen | January 31, 1961 | 4415 |
| 55 | 16 | "The Bitter Feud of Dobie and Maynard" | Stanley Z. Cherry | Story by : Rod Amateau; Teleplay by : Joel Kane | February 7, 1961 | 4418 |
| 56 | 17 | "Zelda, Get Off My Back" | Rod Amateau | Story by : Max Shulman; Teleplay by : Lawrence & Maggie Williams | February 14, 1961 | 4416 |
| 57 | 18 | "I Was a High School Scrooge" | Rod Amateau | Max Shulman | February 21, 1961 | 4420 |
| 58 | 19 | "Will Success Spoil Dobie's Mother?" | Rod Amateau | Story by : Max Shulman; Teleplay by : Ray Allen | February 28, 1961 | 4419 |
| 59 | 20 | "The Second Childhood of Herbert T. Gillis" | Robert Gordon | Joel Kane | March 7, 1961 | 4421 |
| 60 | 21 | "Dobie vs. the Machine" | Rod Amateau | Malvin Wald & Max Shulman | March 14, 1961 | 4423 |
| 61 | 22 | "Baby Shoes" | Robert Gordon | Lawrence Williams, Maggie Williams & Max Shulman | March 21, 1961 | 4422 |
| 62 | 23 | "I Didn't Raise My Boy to Be a Soldier, Sailor or Marine" | Rod Amateau | Joel Kane | March 28, 1961 | 4424 |
| 63 | 24 | "The Chicken Corporal" | Rod Amateau | Arnold Horwitt | April 4, 1961 | 4425 |
| 64 | 25 | "The Solid Gold Dog-Tag" | Guy Scarpitta | Dean Riesner | April 11, 1961 | 4427 |
| 65 | 26 | "The Battle of Maynard's Beard" | Rod Amateau | Dean Riesner | April 18, 1961 | 4429 |
| 66 | 27 | "Spaceville" | Rod Amateau | Arnold Horwitt | April 25, 1961 | 4428 |
| 67 | 28 | "Like Mother, Like Daughter, Like Wow" | Rod Amateau | Ray Allen | May 2, 1961 | 4430 |
| 68 | 29 | "Dobie Plays Cupid" | Rod Amateau | Joel Kane | May 9, 1961 | 4431 |
| 69 | 30 | "Like Father, Like Son, Like Trouble" | Stanley Z. Cherry | Bud Nye | May 16, 1961 | 4432 |
| 70 | 31 | "Be It Ever So Humble" | Rod Amateau | Arnold Horwitt | May 23, 1961 | 4433 |
| 71 | 32 | "Ah! Yer Fadder Wears Army Shoes" | Rod Amateau | Bill Gammie & Max Shulman | May 30, 1961 | 4435 |
| 72 | 33 | "Everything But the Truth" | Stanley Z. Cherry | Joel Kane | June 6, 1961 | 4434 |
| 73 | 34 | "Goodbye, Mr. Pomfritt - Hello, Mr. Chips" | Guy Scarpitta | Joel Kane | June 13, 1961 | 4436 |
| 74 | 35 | "Take Me to Your Leader" | Rod Amateau | Lawrence Williams, Maggie Williams & Max Shulman | June 20, 1961 | 4403 |
| 75 | 36 | "This Ain't the Way We Used to Do It" | Stanley Z. Cherry | Bud Nye | June 27, 1961 | 4426 |

=== Season 3 (1961–62) ===
| No. overall | No. in season | Title | Directed by | Written by | Original release date | Prod. code |
|---|---|---|---|---|---|---|
| 76 | 1 | "The Ruptured Duck" | Rod Amateau | Max Shulman | October 10, 1961 | 5401 |
| 77 | 2 | "Dobie, Dobie, Who's Got the Dobie?" | Rod Amateau | Story by : Rod Amateau; Teleplay by : Les Pine | October 17, 1961 | 5404 |
| 78 | 3 | "Move Over, Perry Mason" | Rod Amateau | Story by : Rod Amateau; Teleplay by : Dean Riesner | October 24, 1961 | 5402 |
| 79 | 4 | "The Fast, White Mouse" | Rod Amateau | Max Shulman | October 31, 1961 | 5405 |
| 80 | 5 | "The Gigolo" | Rod Amateau | Joel Kane | November 7, 1961 | 5406 |
| 81 | 6 | "Dig, Dig, Dig" | Rod Amateau | Max Shulman | November 14, 1961 | 5407 |
| 82 | 7 | "Eat, Drink and Be Merry...For Tomorrow, Ker-Boom!" | Guy Scarpitta | Teleplay by: Lawrence & Maggie Williams & Joel Kane; Story by Lawrence Williams & Maggie Williams | November 21, 1961 | 5408 |
| 83 | 8 | "The Richest Squirrel in Town" | Rod Amateau | Story by : Max Shulman; Teleplay by : Dean Riesner | November 28, 1961 | 5410 |
| 84 | 9 | "The Second Most Beautiful Girl in the World" | Guy Scarpitta | Max Shulman | December 5, 1961 | 5409 |
| 85 | 10 | "This Town Ain't Big Enough for Me and Robert Browning" | Rod Amateau | Max Shulman | December 12, 1961 | 5411 |
| 86 | 11 | "Have Reindeer, Will Travel" | Rod Amateau | Arnold Horwitt | December 19, 1961 | 5413 |
| 87 | 12 | "Crazylegs Gillis" | Rod Amateau | Story by : Max Shulman; Teleplay by : Terry Ryan & Joel Kane | December 26, 1961 | 5414 |
| 88 | 13 | "The Blue-Tail Fly" | Rod Amateau | Arnold Horwitt | January 2, 1962 | 5412 |
| 89 | 14 | "I Do Not Choose to Run" | Rod Amateau | Story by : Rod Amateau; Teleplay by : Les Pine & Joel Kane | January 9, 1962 | 5415 |
| 90 | 15 | "Happiness Can't Buy Money" | Guy Scarpitta | Story by : Max Shulman; Teleplay by : Dean Riesner | January 16, 1962 | 5417 |
| 91 | 16 | "The Magnificent Failure" | Rod Amateau | Bud Nye | January 23, 1962 | 5416 |
| 92 | 17 | "For Whom the Wedding Bell Tolls" | Stanley Z. Cherry | Arnold Horwitt | January 30, 1962 | 5418 |
| 93 | 18 | "Girls Will Be Boys" | Rod Amateau | Joel Kane | February 13, 1962 | 5414 |
| 94 | 19 | "The Marriage Counselor" | Rod Amateau | Story by : Rod Amateau; Teleplay by : Les Pine | February 20, 1962 | 5421 |
| 95 | 20 | "The Big Blunder and Egg Man" | Rod Amateau | Story by: Bud Nye; Teleplay by: Bud Nye & Max Shulman | February 27, 1962 | 5430 |
| 96 | 21 | "Birth of a Salesman" | Rod Amateau | Arnold Horwitt | March 6, 1962 | 5426 |
| 97 | 22 | "Like, Oh, Brother!" | Guy Scarpitta | Story by: Arnold Horwitt; Teleplay by: Arnold Horwitt & Joel Kane | March 13, 1962 | 5422 |
| 98 | 23 | "Dobie Gillis: Wanted Dead or Alive" | Rod Amateau | Max Shulman | March 20, 1962 | 5424 |
| 99 | 24 | "Names My Mother Called Me" | Rod Amateau | Lawrence Williams, Maggie Williams & Max Shulman | March 27, 1962 | 5423 |
| 100 | 25 | "An American Strategy" | Rod Amateau | Story by : Max Shulman; Teleplay by : Dean Riesner | April 3, 1962 | 5428 |
| 101 | 26 | "The Truth Session" | Rod Amateau | Story by : Rod Amateau; Teleplay by : Henry Sharp & Max Shulman | April 10, 1962 | 5433 |
| 102 | 27 | "I Remember Muu Muu" | David Davis | Joel Kane | April 17, 1962 | 5435 |
| 103 | 28 | "Sweet Success of Smell" | Stanley Z. Cherry | Joel Kane | April 24, 1962 | 5429 |
| 104 | 29 | "When Other Friendships Have Been Forgot" | Rod Amateau | Joel Kane | May 1, 1962 | 5434 |
| 105 | 30 | "I Was a Boy Sorority Girl" | Ralph Murphy | Arnold Horwitt | May 8, 1962 | 5427 |
| 106 | 31 | "It Takes a Heap o' Livin' to Make a Cave a Home" | Rod Amateau | Arnold Horwitt | May 15, 1962 | 5421 |
| 107 | 32 | "Back-To-Nature Boy" | Guy Scarpitta | Joel Kane | May 22, 1962 | 5437 |
| 108 | 33 | "How to Cheat an Honest Man" | Guy Scarpitta | Story by : Rod Amateau; Teleplay by : Les Pine & Joel Kane | May 29, 1962 | 5425 |
| 109 | 34 | "Bachelor Father...and Son" | Stanley Z. Cherry | Joel Kane | June 5, 1962 | 5438 |
| 110 | 35 | "Like Low Noon" | Rod Amateau | Dean Riesner | June 12, 1962 | 5420 |
| 111 | 36 | "The Frat's in the Fire" | Stanley Z. Cherry | Joel Kane | June 26, 1962 | 5403 |

=== Season 4 (1962–63) ===
| No. overall | No. in season | Title | Directed by | Written by | Original release date |
|---|---|---|---|---|---|
| 112 | 1 | "A Funny Thing Happened to Me on the Way to a Funny Thing" | Rod Amateau | Bud Nye | September 26, 1962 |
| 113 | 2 | "What's a Little Murder Between Friends?" | Rod Amateau | Max Shulman | October 3, 1962 |
| 114 | 3 | "Northern Comfort" | Rod Amateau | Dean Riesner | October 10, 1962 |
| 115 | 4 | "The Ugliest American" | Rod Amateau | Joel Kane | October 17, 1962 |
| 116 | 5 | "A Splinter Off the Old Block" | Rod Amateau | Max Shulman | October 24, 1962 |
| 117 | 6 | "What Makes the Varsity Drag?" | Guy Scarpitta | Bud Nye | October 31, 1962 |
| 118 | 7 | "Like, Hi, Explosives" | Rod Amateau | Bud Nye & Joel Kane | November 7, 1962 |
| 119 | 8 | "Where Is Thy Sting?" | Rod Amateau | Joel Kane | November 14, 1962 |
| 120 | 9 | "Flow Gently, Sweet Money" | Rod Amateau | Arnold Horwitt | November 21, 1962 |
| 121 | 10 | "Strictly for the Birds" | Guy Scarpitta | Arnold Horwitt | November 28, 1962 |
| 122 | 11 | "The Iceman Goeth" | Rod Amateau | Max Shulman | December 5, 1962 |
| 123 | 12 | "Dr. Jerkell & Mr. Gillis" | Rod Amateau | Dean Riesner | December 12, 1962 |
| 124 | 13 | "Will the Real Santa Claus Please Come Down the Chimmey?" | Rod Amateau | Arnold Horwitt | December 19, 1962 |
| 125 | 14 | "Who Did William Tell?" | Rod Amateau | Arnold Horwitt | January 2, 1963 |
| 126 | 15 | "Too Many Kooks Spoil the Broth" | Guy Scarpitta | Bud Nye | January 9, 1963 |
| 127 | 16 | "Vocal Boy Makes Good" | Rod Amateau | Dean Riesner | January 16, 1963 |
| 128 | 17 | "All Right, Dobie, Drop the Gun" | Rod Amateau | Arnold Horwitt | January 23, 1963 |
| 129 | 18 | "And Now a Word from Our Sponsor" | Rod Amateau | Arnold Horwitt | January 30, 1963 |
| 130 | 19 | "Two for the Whipsaw" | David Davis | Bud Nye | February 6, 1963 |
| 131 | 20 | "The Moon and No Pence" | Rod Amateau | Bud Nye | February 13, 1963 |
| 132 | 21 | "The Beast with Twenty Fingers" | Rod Amateau | Arnold Horwitt | February 20, 1963 |
| 133 | 22 | "Thanks for the Memory" | Rod Amateau | Max Shulman | February 27, 1963 |
| 134 | 23 | "Three Million Coins in the Fountain" | Rod Amateau | Joel Kane | March 6, 1963 |
| 135 | 24 | "Beethoven, Presley, and Me" | Guy Scarpitta | Dean Riesner | March 13, 1963 |
| 136 | 25 | "The Little Chimp That Couldn't" | Stanley Z. Cherry | Arnold Horwitt | March 20, 1963 |
| 137 | 26 | "There's Always Room for One Less" | Tom Montgomery | Bud Nye | March 27, 1963 |
| 138 | 27 | "The General Cried at Dawn" | David Davis | Bud Nye | April 3, 1963 |
| 139 | 28 | "Now I Lay Me Down to Steal" | Guy Scarpitta | Arnold Horwitt | April 10, 1963 |
| 140 | 29 | "Lassie, Get Lost" | Rod Amateau | Dean Riesner | April 17, 1963 |
| 141 | 30 | "The Rice and Old Shoes Caper" | Rod Amateau | Arnold Horwitt | April 24, 1963 |
| 142 | 31 | "Requiem for an Underweight Heavyweight" | Rod Amateau | Arnold Horwitt | May 1, 1963 |
| 143 | 32 | "I Was a Spy for the F.O.B." | Tom Montgomery | Bud Nye | May 8, 1963 |
| 144 | 33 | "There's a Broken Light for Every Broken Heart on Broadway" | David Davis | Joel Kane | May 15, 1963 |
| 145 | 34 | "Beauty Is Only Kin Deep" | Rod Amateau | Bud Nye | May 22, 1963 |
| 146 | 35 | "The Call of the, Like, Wild" | Guy Scarpitta | Dean Riesner | May 29, 1963 |
| 147 | 36 | "The Devil and Dobie Gillis" | Guy Scarpitta | Story by : Max Shulman; Teleplay by : Bud Nye | June 5, 1963 |
