= Zelda Gilroy =

Fictional character

- The Many Loves of Dobie Gillis character
- Created by: Max Shulman
- Portrayed by: Sheila Kuehl

In-universe information
- Alias: Zelda K. Gilroy
- Gender: Female
- Nationality: American

Zelda K. Gilroy, portrayed by Sheila Kuehl, is a character from the American sitcom The Many Loves of Dobie Gillis, which originally aired on CBS from 1959 to 1963. A teenage girl who was bright in academics and excelled in athletics, Zelda was smitten with the handsome, clean-cut teenager Dobie Gillis, played by Dwayne Hickman, who had his romantic sights set on more popular girls. Most of these, however, shunned him for various reasons. Zelda was always there for Dobie and his friend Maynard G. Krebs, portrayed by Bob Denver.

== History ==
The character originated not on television, but in "Love is a Science", a Dobie Gillis short story written by humorist Max Shulman and included in his 1959 Dobie Gillis short-story collection I Was a Teenage Dwarf. "Love is a Science" was one of several of the Shulman short stories adapted by the author for the Dobie Gillis television program. Originally intended to play Zelda as a one-shot in the TV adaptation of "Love is a Science" on Dobie Gillis in 1959, Sheila Kuehl was upped to recurring and then semi-regular by the show's second season, and continued to appear throughout the run of the program.

Zelda especially irritated Dobie by wrinkling her nose at him. He always wrinkled back; he claimed it was a reflex action (often admonishing her "Now cut that out!"), while she took it as proof that he loved her but did not realize it yet. Zelda assured Dobie that he would eventually come to realize his love for her through the influence of "propinquity": because he was Gillis and she was Gilroy, they were always going to be seated together through high school and college and would eventually fall in love.

The Zelda character became popular enough to warrant a spinoff pilot, titled Zelda, produced in late 1961 for consideration for the 1962–1963 television season. Despite early enthusiasm for the show at CBS, the network eventually decided to pass on it. Sheila Kuehl, at the time a closeted lesbian and later an openly gay politician in California, later recalled that Dobie Gillis and Zelda producer/director Rod Amateau told her one day that CBS executive James T. Aubrey had found the Zelda character "too butch".

Although Dobie was romantically uninterested in Zelda in the series, in two later Dobie Gillis reunion productions, he was depicted as having married Zelda. In the 1977 TV pilot Whatever Happened to Dobie Gillis?, the now middle-aged Dobie and Zelda are seen running the Gillis family's grocery store with the help of Dobie's father Herbert, while the 1988 TV movie Bring Me the Head of Dobie Gillis showed just Dobie and Zelda running the store. In both productions, the two had a teenaged son named Georgie (played by Steven Paul in 1977 and Scott Grimes in 1988), who was much like Dobie was at his age.

In 1969, Zelda was used as the main source of inspiration for the character of Velma Dinkley from the show Scooby-Doo, Where Are You!, whose main cast was modeled on various Dobie Gillis characters.
