= Gilligan's Island (disambiguation) =

Gilligan's Island is an enduringly popular 1960s American television comedy.

Gilligan's Island may also refer to:

== Entertainment ==
- Gilligan's Island (film), the remake film of the TV series
- Rescue from Gilligan's Island, 1978 TV movie
- The Castaways on Gilligan's Island, 1979 TV movie
- Surviving Gilligan's Island, 2001 TV docudrama
- The Real Gilligan's Island, 2004–2005 TV reality show
- Gilligan's Island (pinball), a 1991 pinball machine based on the TV show
- The Adventures of Gilligan's Island, also known as Gilligan's Island: The Video Game, a 1990 video game based on the TV show
- "Gilligan's Island (Stairway)", a song by Little Roger and the Goosebumps

== Other uses ==
- Gilligan's Island, an alternate name of one of the cays of the Cayos de Caña Gorda, south of Puerto Rico
- Gilligan's Island, a nickname for a secondary pitlane at Sonoma Raceway

== See also ==
- The New Adventures of Gilligan, 1974–75 American cartoon, based on the original TV series
- Gilligan's Planet, 1983–84 American cartoon, based on the original TV series
- Gilligan's Wake, 2003 novel, loosely based on the original TV series
