= Gilligan's Wake =

2003 novel by Tom Carson

- Author: Tom Carson
- Publisher: Picador
- Publication date: January 2003
- ISBN: 978-0-312-29123-5

Gilligan's Wake (ISBN 0-312-29123-X) is a 2003 novel, loosely based on the 1960s CBS sitcom Gilligan's Island, written by Esquire film and television critic Tom Carson. The title is derived from the title of the TV show and Finnegans Wake, the final work of Irish novelist James Joyce. The novel was published subsequently as a paperback in 2004 (ISBN 0-312-31114-1).

Carson's text contains several deviations from the TV series' established canon, including Ginger Grant being born in a fictional small town in Alabama (rather than New York City as depicted in the show); and the surname and birthplace of Mary Ann Summers. Whether these were errors of research or deliberate changes on Carson's part is unclear.

== Plot summary ==
Each of the seven castaways narrate an autobiographical story—almost totally unrelated to the events of the show—in order of their mention in the show's title theme. Their stories intersect with a character named John Gilbert "Jack" Egan, a Marine-turned-CIA operative, whose own life is the meta-narrative which ties the novel together. Each chapter features an important person or object in the lives of the castaways whose name is an anagram of "Gilligan"; additionally, a character whose name is a variant of "Susan" and Maxwell House coffee appears or is referred to in each story.

== Chapters ==
- This Tiny Ship (Gilligan's story): This chapter is the shortest, and also somewhat unclear. It has a writing style similar to Thomas Pynchon's, as displayed in V. and Gravity's Rainbow, with a series of puns and popular culture allusions. The main character believes himself to be Maynard G. Krebs, the beatnik character from the TV series The Many Loves of Dobie Gillis (on their respective shows, both Krebs and Gilligan were portrayed by actor Bob Denver). The chapter opens with Maynard/Gilligan living a beat lifestyle in San Francisco with his girlfriend Suze. He is knocked unconscious by a falling Maxwell House billboard during a protest against the Bay of Pigs invasion, and comes to in the Mayo Clinic, being treated for mental illness under the care of Dr. Kildare F. Troop. Dr. Troop tells Krebs that he has lived in Rochester, Minnesota his whole life, and calls him by a name that Krebs hates (never mentioned, but implied to be Gilligan). Krebs refuses to accept this, and his story grows more erratic and confusing as Dr. Troop subjects him to powerful electroshock therapy in a final attempt to cure him. The chapter ends ambiguously, with Krebs/Gilligan shouting out various non sequiturs while Dr. Troop turns the voltage ever higher.
- The Skipper's Tale (The Skipper's story): The Skipper reminisces about his service as a PT boat skipper in the Pacific War. The chapter opens with him talking to his friends, the skippers of PT-109 (future president John F. Kennedy) and PT-73 (Quinton McHale from the TV series McHale's Navy). Here, Susan is Screw-Me Susie, a cheap prostitute from the Panama Canal Zone, whom both the Skipper and McHale knew. After having a cup of Maxwell House with McHale at Nick's Snack Shack, a business operated by a fellow naval officer, the secretive and distant Richard Nixon, the Skipper departs with his crew (including a dumb young kid named Algligni) on a supply run to another island. That evening, something large and black gets caught in the propeller and they stall. The dark scares everyone too much to try to free the object, so they all sleep on the deck of the drifting boat. The Skipper has a weird dream with many cameos from fictional characters. Come daybreak, they find that the dark object is the hideously burnt body of a Japanese soldier. This terrifies them even more, and they crouch in the bow to hide from it. Eventually, they are rescued by McHale, who doesn't notice the corpse. As they are being towed, Algligni shoots it apart with the boat's .50 Cal. Unable to explain why the body terrified them so much, the crew never tells anyone about it, instead explaining that their propeller was fouled with seaweed.
- Alger and Dean and My Son and I and Whatnot (Mr. Howell's story): Here, Howell shows himself to be ignorant and blustering, but also somewhat humble. His first memory recounted is of the time he met Alger Hiss and a Russian revolutionary, Mr. Gliaglin, in New York. Not noticing obvious signs that the two are Communists, he helps get Hiss a job in the State Department. He also remembers telling Dean Acheson that Hiss was a Communist, which Acheson took as a joke. He also admits that he knows his wife does not love him nearly as much as he loves her, and even reminisces about a time in the early 1940s, when he nearly caught her in an indiscretion in a bower with their son's tutor, which she hastily covers up by offering him another cup of Maxwell House, even though the silver pot and china cups have been untouched. Nevertheless, he feels lucky that she decided to live with him anyway, noting that "[h]er presence is my consolation for my inconsolability in her presence". As his rebellious son grows up and begins dating an intelligent French Canadian girl, Suzanne, Howell finds himself drawn increasingly into a series of comic books, Two-Fisted American Stories, that have begun to be delivered instead of his newspaper. They depict various American military and covert operations around the world as fictional adventure stories, such as the 1954 Guatemalan coup d'état and the Phoenix Program. Eventually, his son reveals to him that these books are propaganda, meant to keep the class of older, wealthy people in the country from taking any current events too seriously. After burning the books on his son's orders, however, Howell finds himself listless and uninterested in anything, and eventually has a heart attack. In the hospital, he tells his son his view that dying for a purpose is pointless, and that he intends to slip away, as if after a long and tiring day.
- Sail Away (Lovey's story): Mrs. Howell (not actually named Lovey; that was Thurston Howell's later nickname for her) was born into a wealthy Eastern family. She loved her oil-driller father, but despised her suffragette mother and their maid, Lil Gagni. Eventually, her father moved out to Los Angeles on the pretext of drilling for oil, but instead began living with another woman, leaving Lovey feeling betrayed. Upon growing up, she lived the opulent lifestyle of the young and rich in the Jazz Age, but her obvious and admitted Elektra complex prevents her from sustaining any real relationship with men, despite Thurston Howell's dogged efforts. She begins a friendship with Daisy Buchanan (a character from the novel The Great Gatsby). Daisy is struggling for companionship after her husband's death, and tries to get Lovey closer by addicting her to morphine and pursuing a lesbian relationship with her. At first Lovey resists when she realizes Daisy's lesbian intentions, but in the end, she misses the experience of the morphine trips (which she describes as "sailing away") and drives back to East Egg – past a Maxwell House billboard – to be with her again. Over time, however, Lovey finds herself annoyed with Daisy's possessiveness, unintelligent daughter and yappy lap dog (named SooSoo). Ultimately, she realizes that the only person she could ever really love would be an idealized version of her father and leaves Daisy. She comes home to find her mother dead. She destroys her mother's life work, a memoir about her work as a suffragette, which highly offends Lil Gagni. She then proposes to Thurston Howell, not out of love but instead the desire for a steady, loving presence in her life.
- Hello Nurse (Ginger's story): Ginger was a Southern girl from a stereotypical redneck family of the fictional Jolene, Alabama. Ginger goes to Hollywood to become an actress, and as she leaves her mother tells her "not to sleep with any coons". The first job she got in Hollywood was posing for bondage photographs in the employ of a Jewish man, Mr. Gagilnil, at the top of whose building is a billboard for Maxwell House. Ultimately, the activities Mr. Gagilnil asks her to perform become too extreme, even for her, so she is replaced by her even more promiscuous sister, Suzannah. She finds work making B movies for and being the mistress of one Y. Avery Willingham, but leaves when she realizes Willingham is actually her incestuous missing father. Now without work, Ginger and Suzannah are taken by their agent to a mysterious location out in Palm Desert. They ultimately realize they have been brought to Frank Sinatra's house, where they meet Sinatra, John F. Kennedy (a little-known Senator at the time) and Sammy Davis Jr. Kennedy takes Suzannah away, and Davis begins flirting with Ginger. Realizing how open-minded and intelligent she is compared to most of her family, Ginger ignores her mother's demands and beds Davis. Afterwards, the drunken Ginger calls him "Samby" and insinuates that she only slept with him for the thrill of sleeping with a black man. Offended, Davis kicks her out and her agent takes her back to Los Angeles.
- Professor X (The Professor's story): In this chapter, the Professor is depicted as being highly intelligent yet also an egomaniac and a DPW, seeing his sexual encounters as charity to the imperfect. He worked on the Manhattan Project and was personally responsible for the choice of Nagasaki as the location of the second A-bombing. After the war, he is convinced by Roy Cohn (Joseph McCarthy's legal counsel) to join a secret cabal headquartered under Theodore Roosevelt Island, which has controlled the nation since World War II. Among the Professor's accomplishments were the founding of the CIA, the Suez Crisis and the Apollo Program (to get rid of surplus money and talent). Meanwhile, the Professor's desires grew more extreme, and he began taking Laggilin pills for a heart condition. In the mid-1960s he started a program to see if the ignorant masses (or Gillies, as he calls them) are really as dumb as everyone else assumes they are. He marooned six civilians, along with himself, on an island off the coast of California. Unknown to the castaways, he could come and go as he pleased, and would sabotage all their efforts to escape. He eventually grew bored with and abandoned the project after three years. This project is implied to be the inspiration for the Gilligan's Island TV series. To avoid scrutiny during the Watergate scandal, the Professor leaves the underground headquarters, swimming to shore via the emergency exit and removing supplies from a secret cache located directly underneath a Maxwell House billboard to enable him to survive above ground. Later, the Professor decides to work as a high-school history teacher in Arlington, Virginia. He seduces a high school girl, Sue, but is forced to quit his job when her boyfriend discovers them. Eventually, the Professor decides to find the ultimate disability, and settles on a survivor of the Nagasaki bombing. Flying to Japan, he finds a woman with the help of an unscrupulous doctor. He rapes her in her hotel room, but the exertion kills her. He finds that he is out of Laggilin, but the doctor refuses to help him. The doctor reveals that he works for the same organization as the Professor, which went global long ago, and that the Professor's services are no longer required. Without his pills, the Professor suffers a mental breakdown. He returns to Washington, D.C. and ends up wandering the streets as an insane, homeless man, not remembering anything of his former life.
- Yesterday Never Knows (Mary Ann's story): Mary Ann's story is the longest and most detailed in the book, and ties up many loose ends. Mary Ann (named Mary Ann Kilroy in the book, after Kilroy was here) was a girl from Russell, Kansas. In the book, Russell is similar to Brigadoon in that it only appears to outsiders every hundred years, on the Fourth of July. Her father had died in World War II, and she was raised by her librarian mother. Eventually, she achieves her dream of attending the Sorbonne in Paris. While there, she dates future New Wave director Jean-Luc Godard. Daily life in Paris is disturbed by the bombs of the OAS and the smaller bombs of the safecracking Lili Gang. Before she returns to the United States, Mary Ann finds herself incapable of losing her virginity – her hymen grows back soon after any sexual encounter. She eventually finds that this makes her a perpetual innocent. Upon returning, she finds that this trait has made her an outsider, and she can no longer enter Russell. She finds work as a translator at the UN Headquarters in New York, bunking with a roommate named Susan. Nevertheless, she soon becomes dissatisfied with her life, noting that it is not her cup of Maxwell House. Noting several inconsistencies with her life, Mary Ann asks Susan what's going on. In a surreal conversation, Susan explains everything that has happened in the book. The entire book has been a series of fantasies by one Jack Gil Egan. Egan's father, who has the same name, was a Marine in World War II. He later joined the CIA as an international troubleshooter. This meant that Egan Jr. grew up an American citizen without ever seeing America. Eventually, the Egan family returned to America, where Egan Jr. tried desperately to be accepted by the other children. He got a nickname which he hated, Gilligan (Gil Egan), after the character on the TV series. He got a girlfriend, Susan, whom he thought of as a symbol of American normality rather than someone to actually be loved. Their differences make Egan feel inadequate, and their relationship was never fruitful. Angrily, Susan began a secret relationship with her history teacher as revenge. Egan broke off Susan's and his relationship when he found the teacher and Susan together in the woods. When he grew up, Egan became a film and TV critic (the same job as Tom Carson). Remembering his old nickname, the adult Egan used the characters from the old Gilligan's Island TV show in a series of fantasies to come to terms with his betrayal by Susan. Her explanation and Egan's fantasy finished, Susan disappears. Mary Ann, however, being a fictional character Egan had merely borrowed, fades back to home on the imaginary island where she and the other castaways have lived since the 1960s, when they were first imagined.

== Publication history ==
- Carson, Tom (January 2003). Gilligan's Wake (1st (hardback) ed.). USA: Picador. ISBN 0-312-29123-X.

== Critical reaction ==
Publishers Weekly gave the novel a "starred" (favorable) review, while The New York Times considered it "not as good as Finnegans Wake, but (...) better than Gilligan's Island."

Booklist also reviewed the novel.
