= Doris Packer =

American actress (1904–1979)

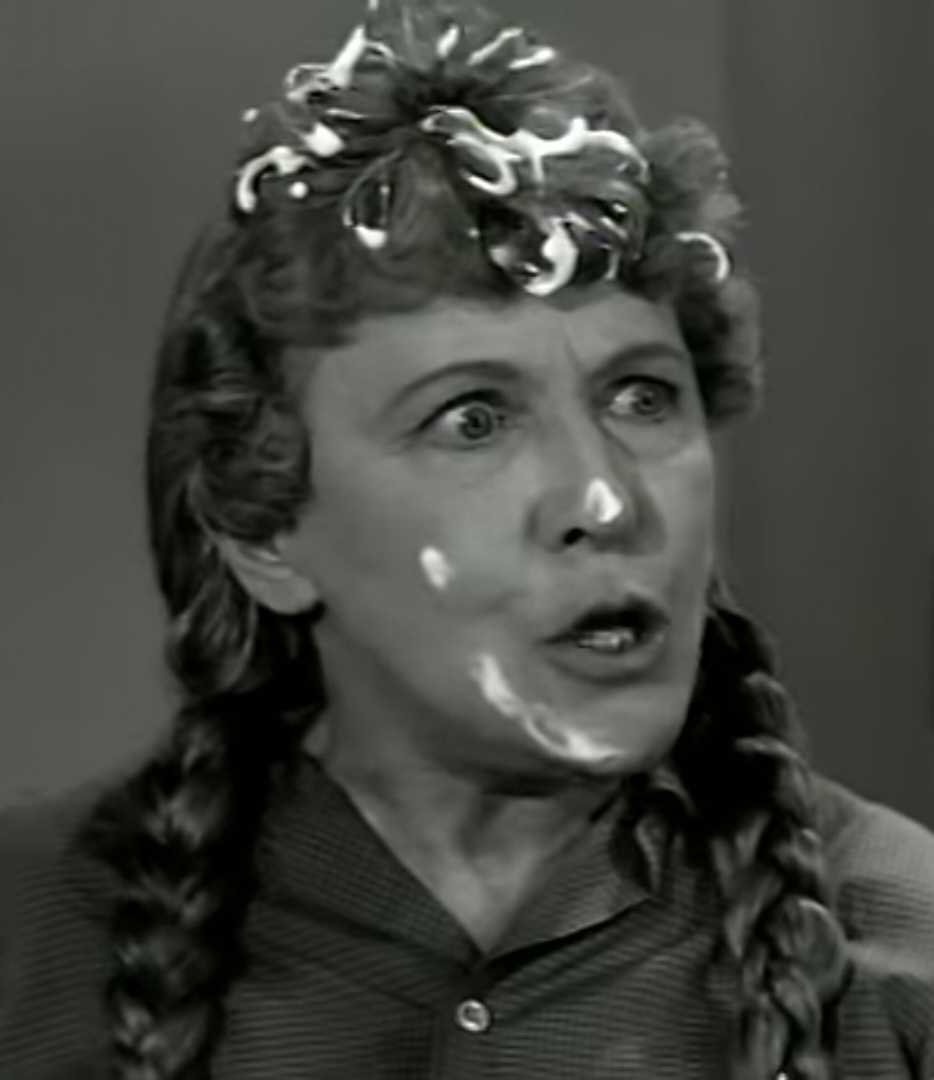
- Packer in the TV series The Beverly Hillbillies, episode The Clampett Look, 1963
- Born: May 30, 1904; Menominee, Michigan, U.S.
- Died: March 31, 1979 (aged 74); Glendale, California, U.S.
- Resting place: Forest Lawn Memorial Park, Glendale
- Education: University of California, Los Angeles
- Occupation: Actress
- Years active: 1953–1975
- Known for: Leave It to Beaver; The George Burns and Gracie Allen Show; The Many Loves of Dobie Gillis; Paradise, Hawaiian Style
- Spouse: Rowland G. Edwards (m. 1928; died 1953)

Doris Packer (May 30, 1904 – March 31, 1979) was an American actress, possibly best known for her recurring role as Mrs. Cornelia Rayburn, Theodore Cleaver's elementary school principal in the television series, Leave It to Beaver.

Packer portrayed the mother of millionaire playboy Chatsworth Osborne, Jr. on CBS's The Many Loves of Dobie Gillis. Before that, she played Clarice Armitage, mother of Milton Armitage, whose character on the series Osborne replaced. She also portrayed an unfavorite teacher, who was retiring after 30 years, on My Favorite Martian. In most of her screen roles, she was known for her aristocratic and intellectual bearing and precise use of the English language.

== Background ==
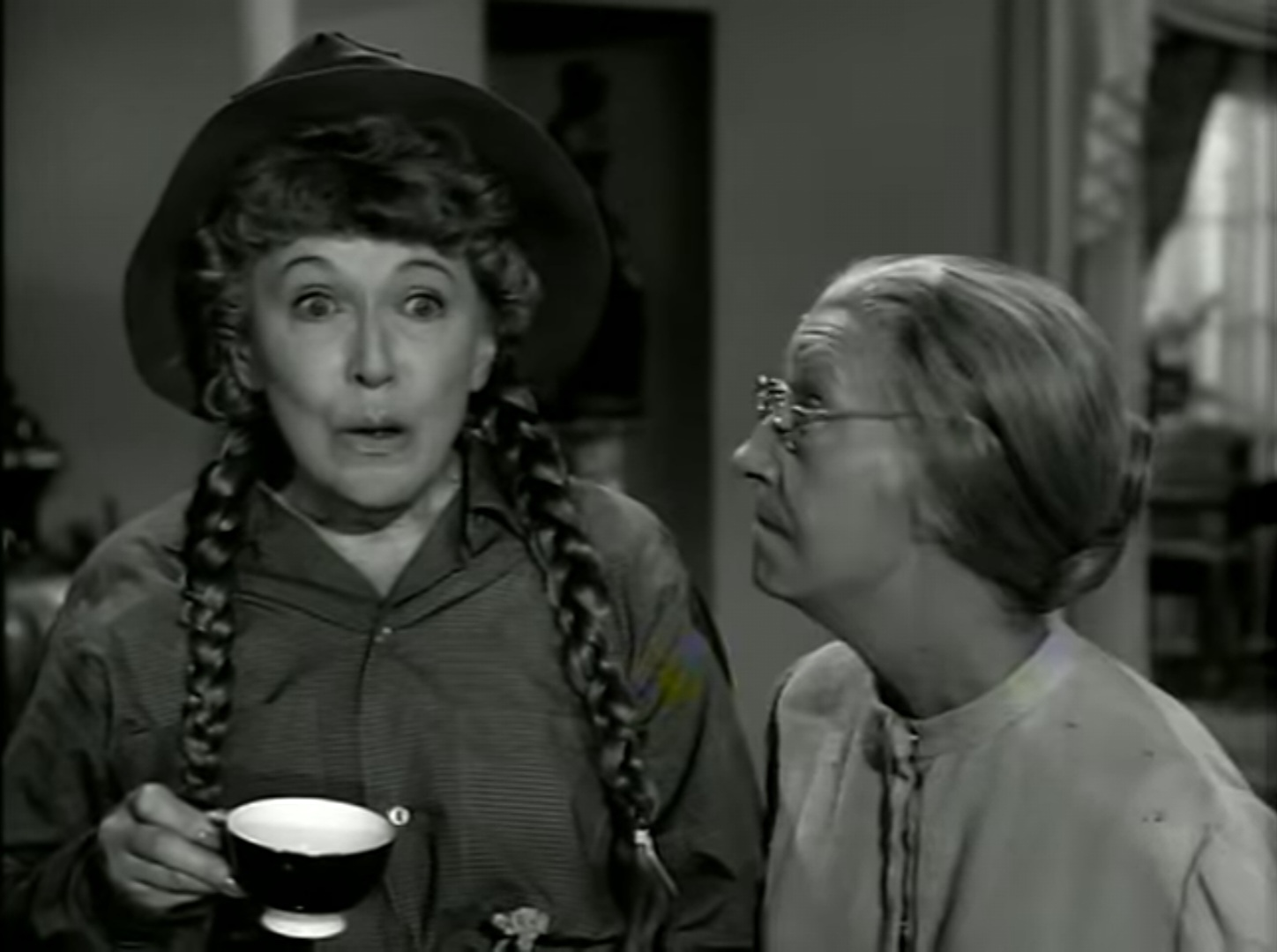
Doris Packer and Irene Ryan in the TV series The Beverly Hillbillies, episode The Clampett Look, 1963

Packer was born in Menominee, Michigan. Her family moved to southern California when she was quite young. She became interested in acting while in high school. After attending the University of California at Los Angeles, she moved to New York City to study under noted drama and dance teacher Evelyn Thomas. Packer also appeared in Broadway shows.

During World War II, Packer enlisted in the U.S. Army Women's Army Corps (WACs), joining in 1943 as a Private and eventually reaching the rank of Technical Sergeant. Her discharge records were likely lost in the 1973 fire at the Military Personnel Records Center.

Packer appeared in an episode of Colgate Theatre in 1958 and played wealthy society matrons on The George Burns and Gracie Allen Show and I Love Lucy and Mrs. Wiley on The Andy Griffith Show. She had a recurring role as Clara Mason in the 1960-61 sitcom Happy. Packer played Mrs. McGillicuddy in the 1961 episode "Gladys' Political Campaign" on the CBS sitcom Pete and Gladys.

She played Grandmother Nedra in S3 E35 (1962) of The Twilight Zone entitled "I Sing the Body Electric". She played the wealthy Mrs Huntingdon in a 1963 episode "I'm No Henry Walden!" on CBS's The Dick Van Dyke Show. She appeared on three episodes of The Beverly Hillbillies as wealthy matron Mrs. Fenwick. She made a guest appearance on Perry Mason in 1962 as Mrs. Campion in "The Case of the Polka Dot Pony". She also played Mrs. Rayburn in "Leave it to Beaver".

During the first season of Petticoat Junction in 1964, Packer appeared in the thirtieth episode, titled "Kate and the Dowager". She portrayed a hotel guest whom Kate Bradley was trying to impress. She played retiring high school teacher Miss Hortense Pringle in a season two episode of My Favorite Martian entitled "We Love You, Miss Pringle" in 1965.

== Family ==
Packer was married to stage director Rowland G. Edwards for 25 years — from September 29, 1928 until his death on August 10, 1953. The couple had no children.

== Death ==
Packer died, aged 74, in 1979 in Glendale, California, of natural causes. Her body is interred in Forest Lawn Memorial Park, Glendale, California, with her grave marker noting her military service.

== Filmography ==
Year	Title	Role	Notes
1953	Meet Me at the Fair	Mrs. Swaile	
1954	About Mrs. Leslie	Boutique customer	Uncredited
1955	Teen-Age Crime Wave	Juvenile Court Judge	Uncredited
1956	Anything Goes	English Woman in Audience	Uncredited
1962	Bon Voyage!	Mrs. Henderson	Uncredited
1962	Mr. Hobbs Takes a Vacation	Hostess	Uncredited
1966	Paradise, Hawaiian Style	Mrs. Barrington	
1967	The Perils of Pauline	Mrs. Carruthers	
1975	Shampoo	Rozalind	(final film role)
