= Arnold Horwitt =

- Publicity Photo of Arnold Horwitt
- Born: July 21, 1918; Richmond, Indiana
- Died: October 20, 1977 (aged 59)

Arnold B. Horwitt (July 21, 1918 – October 20, 1977) was a writer and lyricist for Broadway shows and television.

Horwitt was born in Richmond, Indiana and moved with his family to New York when he was three. He graduated from DeWitt Clinton High School, New York University, and the Columbia School of Journalism. He first worked in vaudeville theaters as an assistant press agent.

Horwitt wrote scripts and lyrics for many plays, songs, and television shows, including Broadway shows such as Make Mine Manhattan (1948) and The Girls Against the Boys (1959). Horwitt also wrote sketches or lyrics for shows such as Are You with It? (1945), Call Me Mister (1946), Two's Company (1952), and Plain and Fancy (1955) (including the often-recorded Young and Foolish). He wrote episodes of numerous television shows from the 1950s into the 1970s, including shows such as The Many Loves of Dobie Gillis and The Patty Duke Show. He also wrote for World War II shows for soldiers.

Horwitt died from cancer in Santa Monica, California at the age of 59 on October 20, 1977.
