= Maynard G. Krebs =

Fictional character

- The Many Loves of Dobie Gillis character
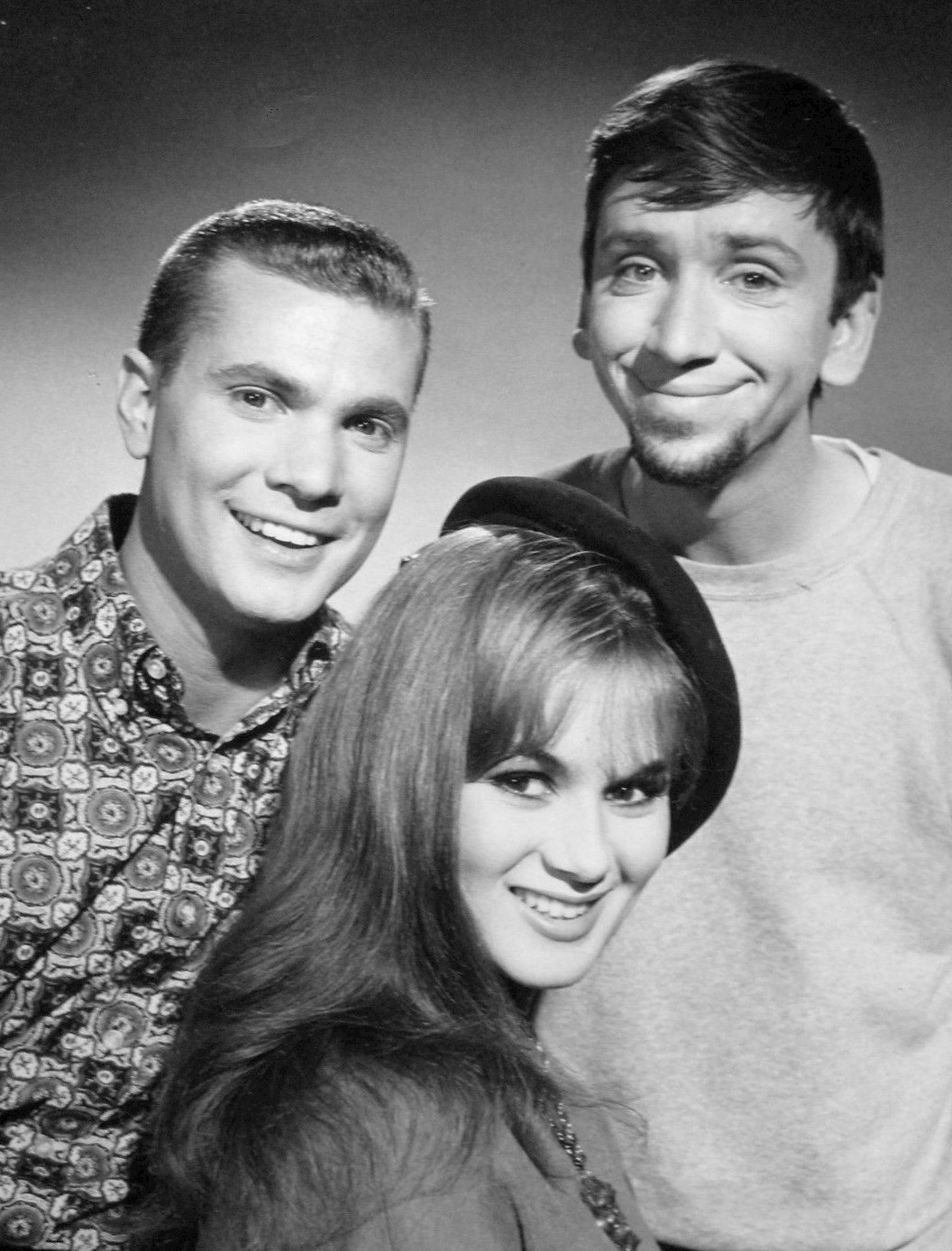
- Maynard G. Krebs (Bob Denver, right), Dobie Gillis (Dwayne Hickman, left), and one of Dobie's "many loves", Yvette LeBlanc (Danielle De Metz), in a publicity still promoting the Dobie Gillis episode "Parlez-Vous English", originally aired December 27, 1960.
- Created by: Max Shulman
- Portrayed by: Bob Denver

In-universe information
- Alias: Maynard Gwalter Krebs
- Gender: Male
- Nationality: American

Maynard Gwalter Krebs is the beatnik sidekick of the title character in the U.S. television sitcom The Many Loves of Dobie Gillis, which aired on CBS from 1959 to 1963.

The character, portrayed by actor Bob Denver, begins the series as a beatnik, with a goatee, "hip" (slang) language, and a generally unkempt, bohemian appearance. He played the bongos and ocarina and sang scat. He also played bebop trumpet. His abhorrence of conventional social forms is signified by comical reactions to three words: "work", "marriage", and "police". For example, whenever the word "work" is mentioned, even in passing, he yelps "Work?!" and jumps with fear or even faints. He serves as a foil to the well-groomed, well-dressed, strait-laced Dobie, who also hates to work, and the contrast between the two friends provides much of the humor of the series.

By the third season of Dobie Gillis, Maynard becomes less of the stereotypical beatnik and more a free soul who "does his own thing," as he might say—including collecting tinfoil or petrified frogs, seeing the old Endicott Building get torn down and going to see the movie The Monster That Devoured Cleveland, which perpetually ran at the Central City Bijou throughout the entire series run. In one episode, he invites Dobie to accompany him to a double-feature of the film and its sequel, Son of the Monster that Devoured Cleveland. Many of the later episodes center around Maynard, with Dobie more of an observer, but always as narrator. The series lasted four years, but its popularity extended into the 1990s and 2000s as channels like Nick at Nite and Me-TV re-broadcast it for new generations.

Maynard's middle name is pronounced "Walter", named for his aunt. The "G" is silent, he would explain.

== Reception ==
In 1999, TV Guide ranked Maynard G. Krebs number 22 on its '50 Greatest TV Characters of All Time' list.

== In popular culture ==
Maynard G. Krebs became a well-known figure in American popular culture.

- The spread of the now-ubiquitous trope phrase "You rang?" can ostensibly be traced back to Maynard G. Krebs's usage of it, despite the misconception that its origin is from being the (originally ad-libbed) catchphrase of Lurch in the 1964 version of The Addams Family, which first aired a year after The Many Loves of Dobie Gillis's CBS airing ceased. The phrase has since become a widely used stock response.
- The series inspired the creators of Scooby-Doo, whose four human characters were modeled from characters on the series, with Shaggy Rogers being inspired by Maynard.
- Krebs appeared in the novel Gilligan's Wake, where Gilligan believed himself to be Krebs. (On their respective shows, both Krebs and Gilligan were portrayed by actor Bob Denver.)
- In The Simpsons episode "Homer the Vigilante", Homer fantasizes riding a nuclear bomb onto a group of beatniks in a parody of a scene from Dr. Strangelove, after which he says, "Take that, Maynard G. Krebs!"
- In the Family Guy episode "Tales of a Third Grade Nothing", Frank Sinatra Jr. refers to the DJ in the nightclub as Maynard G. Krebs.
