= The Many Loves of Dobie Gillis =

American sitcom (1959–1963)

- First season title card
- Also known as: Dobie Gillis (seasons 2–3); Max Shulman's Dobie Gillis (season 4)
- Genre: Sitcom
- Created by: Max Shulman
- Based on: The Many Loves of Dobie Gillis and I Was a Teen-Age Dwarf by Max Shulman
- Directed by: Rod Amateau; Stanley Z. Cherry; David Davis; Robert Gordon; Tom Montgomery; Ralph Murphy
- Starring: Dwayne Hickman; Frank Faylen; Florida Friebus; Bob Denver
- Theme music composer: Lionel Newman; Max Shulman
- Opening theme: "Dobie", performed by Judd Conlon's Rhythmaires (season 1–2) "Dobie" (Instrumental) (seasons 3–4)
- Ending theme: "Dobie", performed by Judd Conlon's Rhythmaires (seasons 1–2) "Dobie" (Instrumental) (seasons 3–4)
- Composer: Lionel Newman
- Country of origin: United States
- Original language: English
- No. of seasons: 4
- No. of episodes: 147 (list of episodes)

Production
- Executive producer: Martin Manulis
- Producer: Rod Amateau
- Production location: 20th Century Fox Studios – Hollywood, California
- Cinematography: James Van Trees
- Editors: Johnny Ehrin; Willard Nico; Robert Moore
- Camera setup: Single-camera setup
- Running time: 26 min
- Production companies: 20th Century-Fox Television; Martin Manulis Productions; Marman Productions

Original release
- Network: CBS
- Release: September 29, 1959 – June 5, 1963

Related
- The Affairs of Dobie Gillis (1953); Zelda (1962, pilot); Whatever Happened to Dobie Gillis (1978, pilot); Bring Me the Head of Dobie Gillis (1988, telefilm)

The Many Loves of Dobie Gillis (also known as simply Dobie Gillis or Max Shulman's Dobie Gillis in later seasons and in syndication) is an American sitcom starring Dwayne Hickman that aired on CBS from September 29, 1959, to June 5, 1963. The series was adapted from the Dobie Gillis short stories written by Max Shulman since 1945 and first collected in 1951 under the same title as the subsequent TV series, which drew directly on the stories in some scripts. Shulman also wrote a feature-film adaptation of his Dobie Gillis stories for Metro-Goldwyn-Mayer in 1953, titled The Affairs of Dobie Gillis, which featured Bobby Van in the title role.

Hickman in Dobie Gillis was among the first leads to play a teenager on an American television program. Dobie Gillis broke ground by depicting elements of the contemporaneous counterculture, particularly the Beat Generation, primarily embodied in a stereotypical version of the "beatnik", mainly in the character of Maynard G. Krebs, portrayed by actor Bob Denver. Hickman wrote in 1994 that Dobie represented "the end of innocence of the 1950s before the oncoming 1960s revolution".

== Overview ==
=== Dobie Gillis and Maynard G. Krebs ===
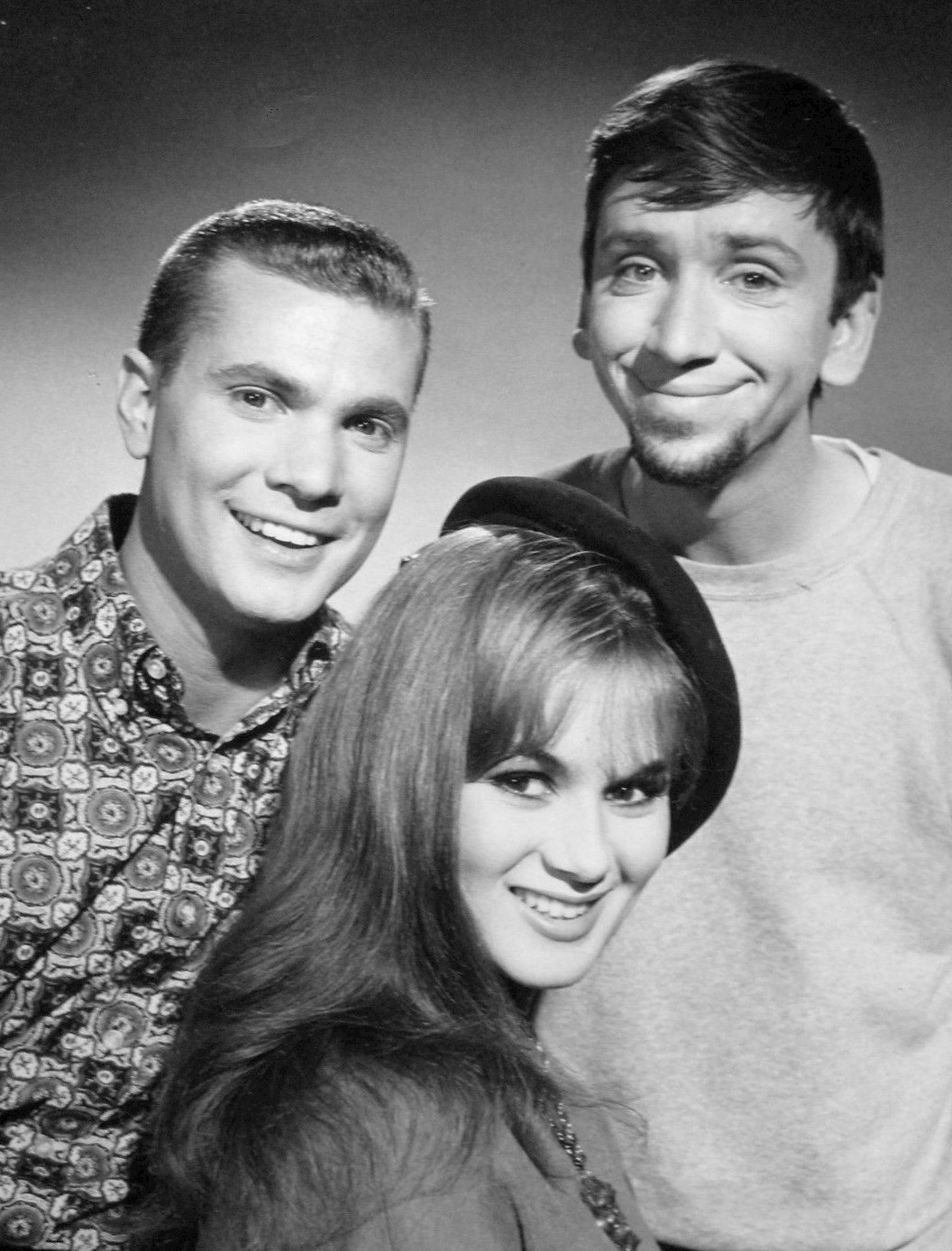
Dobie Gillis (Dwayne Hickman, left), Maynard G. Krebs (Bob Denver, right), and one of Dobie's "many loves", Yvette LeBlanc (Danielle De Metz), in a still from the Dobie Gillis episode "Parlez-Vous English", originally aired December 27, 1960

The series revolved around teenager Dobie Gillis (Dwayne Hickman), who aspired to have popularity, money, and the attention of beautiful and unattainable girls. He did not have any of these qualities in abundance, and the tiny crises surrounding Dobie's lack of success made the story in each weekly episode. Also constantly in question, by Dobie and others, was Dobie's future, as the boy proved to be a poor student and an aimless drifter.

His sidekick and best friend was American television's first beatnik, Maynard G. Krebs (Bob Denver), who became the series's breakout character. An enthusiastic fan of jazz music (with a strong distaste for the music of Lawrence Welk), Maynard plays the piano and bongos, collects tinfoil and petrified frogs, and steers clear of romance, authority figures, and work (yelping "Work?!" every time he hears the word). Always speaking with the vernacular and slang of the beatniks and jazz musicians he admired, Maynard punctuates his sentences with the word "like" and has a tendency towards malapropisms. The main running gag on Dobie Gillis would have Dobie or one of the other characters rattling off a series of adjectives describing something undesirable or disgusting ("I'd be a ragged, useless, dirty wreck!"), at which point a previously unseen Maynard would appear (entering the scene in close-up), saying "You rang?"

Dobie Gillis is set in Central City, a fictitious city in the Midwestern United States (the original short stories are explicitly set in the Minneapolis–Saint Paul area). One of the show's running gags is that Maynard is going downtown "to watch them knock down the old Endicott Building" (which is in Saint Paul, Minnesota). Another running gag is the reference, especially by Maynard, to a film called The Monster that Devoured Cleveland and its sequels, one of which always seems to be playing at the local cinema.

=== Supporting characters ===
Dobie's often apoplectic father, Herbert T. Gillis (Frank Faylen), owned a grocery store and was only happy when Dobie was behind a broom. Dobie's mother, Winifred (Florida Friebus), was a usually calm and serene woman who protected Dobie to the best of her ability and tended to baby him. Herbert Gillis, a proud, hard-working child of the Great Depression and World War II veteran, was often (during the first season of the show) heard to declare, in relation to Dobie, "I gotta kill that boy, I just gotta!" The Gillis family also originally included an older son, Davey Gillis (portrayed by Dwayne Hickman's own older brother, Darryl Hickman), who made three appearances during the first season while home on break from college before being written out of the show.

Dobie's two main antagonists were rich kids Milton Armitage (played by Warren Beatty), who appeared in five episodes, and after Beatty's departure, Chatsworth Osborne Jr., Milton's cousin (played by Steve Franken). Both characters represented the wealth and popularity to which Dobie aspired, but also served as romantic and competitive rivals for Dobie. Beatty's Milton was taller, better looking, and more athletic than Chatsworth (who ultimately proved more amiable/less snobbish than Milton). Doris Packer played Clarissa Osborne, Chatsworth's overbearing and snobbish mother, whom he affectedly (yet affectionately) referred to as "mumsie."

Dobie was hopelessly attracted to the beautiful but greedy blonde Thalia Menninger (Tuesday Weld). Thalia was written out of the series after the first season and was succeeded by a seemingly endless stream of women for whom Dobie hankered. Weld returned as a slightly wiser Thalia for two guest appearances in seasons three and four.

Zelda Gilroy (Sheila James) was a brilliant and eager young girl, hopelessly in love with Dobie, much to his annoyance. Zelda did not find Dobie particularly attractive, but fell in love with him because she found him helpless and needing of her care, and also because of the concept of "propinquity" (or nearness; as Gillis and Gilroy, they were typically seated together in class). Despite his protests, Dobie was clearly fond of Zelda, and Zelda claimed Dobie loved her, but just had not realized it yet. To prove this, she would wrinkle her nose at Dobie, who would reflexively do the same back to Zelda and then protest "now cut that out!" Dobie and Zelda later appeared as a middle-aged married couple in the two spin-off Dobie Gillis reunion projects of the 1970s/1980s.

Leander Pomfritt (Herbert Anderson in the pilot, William Schallert thereafter) was Dobie's English and science teacher at Central High School, and later, when Dobie went to S. Peter Pryor Junior College, Pomfritt (played by Schallert) was on the faculty there, as well. A stern educator fond of deadpan quips, Pomfritt referred to his pupils as "my young barbarians" or "students (and I use that term loosely)" and served as a father figure to both Dobie and Maynard.

=== Format ===
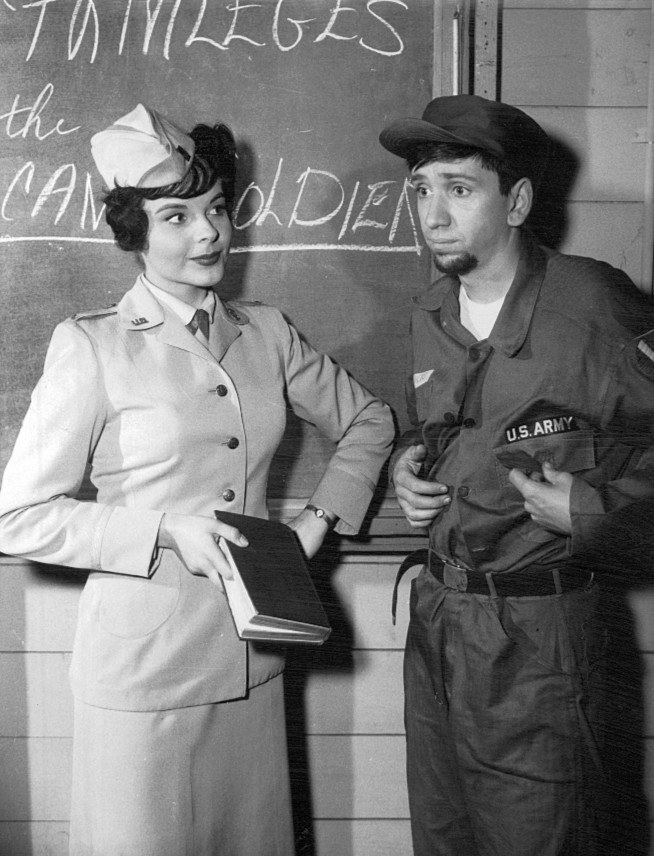
Maynard was not prepared to give up his beard after entering the army. Bob Denver and Kaye Elhardt are featured in this still from the Dobie Gillis episode "The Battle of Maynard's Beard", originally aired April 18, 1961.

Most of the action for the first season-and-a-half of Dobie Gillis centered on the Gillis grocery store, Central High School, and the Central City park. The park scenes are used as the show's framing device, with Dobie sitting on a park bench in front of a reproduction of Auguste Rodin's statue The Thinker. Breaking the fourth wall, he would explain to the viewing audience his problem of the week, usually girls or money (in the earliest episodes, Dobie is seen emulating the trademark pose of The Thinker – head planted on fist in deep contemplation – before turning and acknowledging the camera).

The teen characters graduated from high school halfway through the second season, and Dobie and Maynard (along with Chatsworth) subsequently did a brief stint in the U.S. Army. Dobie continued to break the fourth wall and narrate the episodes, with the park set eschewed for an abstract set with the same reproduction of The Thinker.

At the start of the third season, Dobie and Maynard received their Army discharges, after which they, Zelda, and Chatsworth enroll in S. Peter Pryor Junior College, where Mr. Pomfritt was now a professor after having resigned from his position at Central High. Dobie's science and history teacher at the college was Dr. Imogene Burkhart (Jean Byron, whose real name was used for that of the character). In season four, Dobie's teenaged cousin Duncan "Dunky" Gillis (Bobby Diamond) moves in with the Gillises, and becomes something of a tag-along for Dobie and Maynard. The fourth-season episodes tended more towards surreal plots and situations featuring Maynard as the central character rather than Dobie.

== Cast ==
=== Main ===
- Dwayne Hickman as Dobie Gillis is a clean-cut teenager (later young adult) and unremarkable student whose young heart finds poetry and literature resonant. He aspires to have dates with all of the beautiful girls he pursues, despite the pressures of home life, high school, and later the military and college. Dobie also serves as the series narrator, relating his observations to the audience from in front of a statue of Rodin's The Thinker.
- Frank Faylen as Herbert T. Gillis, Dobie's old-fashioned, short-tempered, and gruff father, who runs a small independent grocery store.
- Florida Friebus as Winifred "Winnie" Gillis is Dobie's doting mother, who tends to baby her son and critique her husband's parenting skills.
- Bob Denver as Maynard G. Krebs is Dobie's lazy and somewhat goofy best friend. Maynard is a would-be beatnik who shuns romance, authority figures, and work. Like Dobie does later, Maynard briefly joins the Army in season two between his high-school graduation and enrollment in college.

=== Semiregulars ===
- Tuesday Weld as Thalia Menninger (season one) is a beautiful high-school classmate of Dobie's. Thalia is only willing to date Dobie when he has money or helps her in her schemes to make some for herself (with a father in poor health and a sister who married a layabout, Thalia sees it as her duty to bring some money into the family; she acknowledges that were this not a factor, she would date Dobie). Weld departed the series after the first season, later returning to make two guest appearances, as a somewhat chastened Thalia, once in season three and once in season four.
- Warren Beatty as Milton Armitage (season one) is a rich jock at Dobie's high school and a rival of Dobie's for Thalia's affections. Beatty quit the series midway through the first season.
- Sheila James as Zelda Gilroy is the smartest girl in Dobie's high school and college. Zelda is in love with the uninterested Dobie and schemes ways to get him to date and marry her.
- Steve Franken as Chatsworth Osborne, Jr., is a spoiled rich boy and a classmate of Dobie's in high school and college. Chatsworth assumed the role left vacant by the departure of Milton from the series. Like Dobie, Chatsworth also briefly joins the Army in season two between his high-school graduation and enrollment in college.
- William Schallert as Professor Leander Pomfritt is a dry-wit English and science teacher at Dobie's high school and later one of Dobie's college professors at S. Peter Pryor Junior College (seasons one-three). Herbert Anderson plays Mr. Pomfritt in the pilot episode.
- Jean Byron as Mrs. Ruth Adams is Dobie's math teacher in high school (season one), and as Dr. Imogene Burkhart, is one of Dobie's professors at S. Peter Pryor Junior College. (seasons three and four). One of the series' inside jokes was that Jean Byron's birth name was Imogene Audette Burkhart.
- Doris Packer as Mrs. Clarice Armitage is Milton's mother, a rich and eccentric socialite. She shifted to Mrs. Clarissa Osborne (Chatsworth Osborne, Jr.'s mother) when Franken replaced Beatty midway through season one. She has disdain for anyone outside her social class and considers all boys, including her own son, as "nasty".

=== Notable recurring roles ===
- Darryl Hickman as Davey Gillis (season one) is Dobie's older brother, a college student no more responsible and no less girl-crazy than Dobie. Davey was written out of the series after season one and Dobie is regarded as an only child thereafter.
- Michael J. Pollard as Jerome Krebs (season one) is Maynard's cousin, also a beatnik. Jerome was intended as a replacement for Maynard when Bob Denver was drafted in mid-1959, and was written out of the show after Denver failed his Army physical and returned to the series.
- Marjorie Bennett as Blossom Kenney (seasons one and two) is a frequent and persnickety customer of the Gillises' grocery store.
- Tommy Farrell as Riff Ryan (seasons one and two) is a beatnik record-store and coffee-house proprietor who serves as something of a reluctant mentor for Maynard.
- Lynn Loring as Edwina "Eddie" Kegel (season three) is Chatsworth Osborne, Jr.'s beatnik cousin.
- Raymond Bailey as Dean McGruder (seasons three and four) is the head of S. Peter Pryor Junior College.

== Episodes ==
Season	Episodes	Originally released		Rank/Rating
Season	Episodes	First released	Last released	Rank/Rating
1	39	September 29, 1959	July 5, 1960	Not in Top 30
2	36	September 27, 1960	June 27, 1961	23/23.0
3	36	October 10, 1961	June 26, 1962	21/22.9
4	36	September 26, 1962	June 5, 1963	Not in Top 30

== Production ==
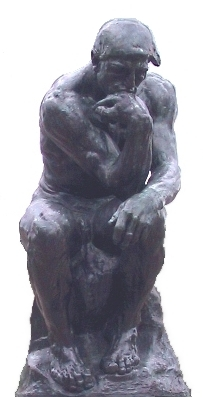
Auguste Rodin's statue of The Thinker

Max Shulman's first Dobie Gillis short stories were printed in 1945, and a short-story compilation, The Many Loves of Dobie Gillis, was published in 1951. These stories were originally published in such magazines as Cosmopolitan and The Saturday Evening Post.

A follow-up collection, I Was a Teen-age Dwarf, appeared in 1959. The titular character appeared at various ages in these stories, all of which are set in St. Paul, Minnesota, though the majority of the stories centered on his college years at the University of Minnesota. Aside from Dobie and his parents, Zelda Gilroy was the only other character from the books directly adapted to the series as a regular or recurring character.

Metro-Goldwyn-Mayer produced the first media adaptation of The Many Loves of Dobie Gillis in 1953 as The Affairs of Dobie Gillis, a black-and-white musical film starring Debbie Reynolds, Bob Fosse, and Bobby Van as Dobie Gillis. Following its release, Shulman set about attempting to bring Dobie Gillis to television. An initial pilot was produced by comedian and producer George Burns in 1957, with his son Ronnie Burns starring as Dobie.

After this pilot did not sell, Shulman took Dobie Gillis to 20th Century Fox Television, run at the time by Martin Manulis. Manulis asked Shulman to reduce the Dobie character's age from 19 to 17, making him a high-school student instead of a college student and an age peer of Ricky Nelson from The Adventures of Ozzie and Harriet and Wally Cleaver (Tony Dow) from Leave It to Beaver. Shulman agreed to the change after negotiating employment for himself on the series as show runner. The Fox pilot, "Caper at the Bijou", featured Dwayne Hickman as Dobie, Frank Faylen and Florida Friebus as his parents, newcomer Bob Denver as a new character, Dobie's beatnik best friend Maynard G. Krebs, and Tuesday Weld as Dobie's unattainable love interest Thalia Menninger.

First pitched to and rejected by NBC, The Many Loves of Dobie Gillis was greenlit for series by CBS. Phillip Morris' Marlboro was the program's primary sponsor, and it sold a week-to-week alternating co-sponsorship to Pillsbury Company for the first two seasons, with Dwayne Hickman appearing in one of the Pillsbury commercials. Colgate-Palmolive replaced Pillsbury as the alternate sponsor in season three.

While the pilot for The Many Loves of Dobie Gillis was shot at the main 20th Century Fox lot in Century City, California, principal photography and production for the series proper took place at the original Fox Film Corporation studio at the intersection of Sunset Boulevard and Western Avenue (next to the headquarters of DeLuxe) in Hollywood. Dobie Gillis was filmed with two cameras, a method that producer and director Rod Amateau had learned while working on The George Burns and Gracie Allen Show. Fox turned out one episode of Dobie Gillis a week, working from May to December of each year. Dwayne Hickman's fourth wall-breaking monologues were saved for the end of the production of each episode; their length resulted in Hickman requesting and getting a teleprompter from which to read them for season two forward.

The show was not filmed before a live studio audience; during the first season, a live audience viewed each episode and provided its laugh track. Subsequent seasons used a standard laugh track provided by technician Charles Douglass.

Creator Max Shulman served as the show runner for and an uncredited producer of Dobie Gillis. He contributed scripts for episodes of the show during all four seasons, with several stories – including "Love is a Science" (season one, episode three), "Love is a Fallacy" (season one, episode 22), and "Parlez-Vous English" (season two, episode 11) – directly adapted by Shulman from his original Dobie Gillis short stories.

During its fourth season, the show, by then known as Max Shulman's Dobie Gillis, suffered both from competition with NBC's color Western The Virginian and from the growing inattention from Max Shulman. Shulman began spending increasing amounts of time at his home in Westport, Connecticut, while the show was in active production, ceding his role as show runner to associate producers Joel Kane and Guy Scarpitta. CBS decided not to renew Dobie Gillis after production had concluded on its fourth season.

The theme song "Dobie" accompanying the UPA-style animated titles was written by 20th Century-Fox musical director Lionel Newman, with lyrics by Shulman. The theme was sung by Judd Conlon's Rhythmaires, with music conducted by Newman. Session singer Gloria Wood of the Rhythmaires provided the scat singing used as incidental score during the first two seasons.

=== Series regular casting notes ===
Dwayne Hickman, at the time the breakout star on The Bob Cummings Show (also known as Love That Bob) as nephew Chuck MacDonald, gained the part of Dobie Gillis over several other candidates, including Michael Landon. Despite being cast as a 17-year-old, Hickman was 24 when he starred in the pilot in the summer of 1958. Because Hickman had appeared for several years on Bob Cummings as Chuck, he was required by Shulman and CBS to bleach his dark brown hair blond for the role of Dobie to distance himself from that character in the public's (and the sponsors') minds. By the second season, however, Hickman was permitted to return to his natural hair color, after he had complained to the producers that the constant bleaching required to keep his low crew cut hairstyle blond was causing his scalp to break out.

Bob Denver, a 23-year-old grade-school teacher and postal worker with no previous professional acting experience, won the part of 18-year-old Maynard G. Krebs after his sister, a casting director's secretary, added his name to a list of candidates auditioning for the role. Denver and Hickman had both attended Loyola University together several years earlier and were casually acquainted before Dobie Gillis. After filming the third episode of Dobie Gillis, Denver announced that he had received his draft notice. The character of Maynard enlisted in the Army and was given an elaborate sendoff in the show's next episode, "Maynard's Farewell to the Troops". Stage actor Michael J. Pollard was brought out from New York to play Maynard's cousin, Jerome Krebs, who was introduced at the end of "Maynard's Farewell to the Troops" and was to assume Maynard's role in future scripts.

Before Pollard had completed his first episode, "The Sweet Singer of Central High", however, Denver returned and announced that he had been designated "4F" – unfit for service – during his physical because of a neck injury he had sustained some years earlier. After completing "The Sweet Singer of Central High", Pollard was bought out of his contract – he had signed a "play-or-pay" contract and was paid for all 30 episodes in which he was to have appeared, while Denver was rehired. Maynard's return was explained by stating that the Army had given Maynard a "hardship discharge" – the Army's hardship, not Maynard's.

Initially only a supporting character, Denver's Maynard had graduated to co-lead by season two, as the character's "beatnik" mannerisms and eccentricities made him a hit with the viewing audience. For a handful of episodes towards the end of season three, Maynard became the show's lead character while Dwayne Hickman was hospitalized with and later recovering from pneumonia.

Despite Maynard's increasing screen time, however, Denver – who had signed on as a Fox contract player without an agent – was unable to negotiate a raise in his $250 a week salary until season four. Denver was able to parlay his role on Dobie Gillis into lead roles on later television series, in particular the one for which he is best remembered, the 1964–67 CBS sitcom Gilligan's Island.

Established actors Frank Faylen, a longtime acquaintance of the Hickman family and a fellow parishioner at their church, and Florida Friebus were cast as Dobie's parents, Herbert T. Gillis and Winifred Gillis. Faylen's gruff, no-nonsense father character, which according to Hickman, was essentially the same as Faylen's real-life personality, was more of an antagonist to Dobie during the first season of the show, his demeanor underscored by his often-repeated catchphrase "I gotta kill that boy! I just gotta!" Both CBS and Marlboro strongly disapproved of the catchphrase and the Herbert T. Gillis character's hard edges. An early season-two episode, "You Ain't Nothin' But a Houn' Dog" (episode two), in which Dobie inadvertently wins a father-and-son essay contest, was produced to explain why Herbert ceased use of his catchphrase. Herbert was further softened as the series wore on, the character's anger tempered to frustration.

=== Recurring casting notes ===
Experienced child actress Tuesday Weld was cast as Dobie's love interest in "Caper at the Bijou" and stayed on as a semiregular. Weld and Dwayne Hickman had previously appeared as a teenaged couple in the 1958 Fox feature film Rally 'Round the Flag, Boys!, based on a Max Shulman novel, though produced without his input. Neither Hickman nor Weld was fond of the other, with Hickman later stating he felt Weld was not as dedicated as necessary to rehearsal and referring to her as "a pain in the neck". Weld reportedly found Hickman pushy and out-of-touch. Aged 15 at the time of shooting the pilot, Weld had to legally spend much of her time on set in school with a tutor, and the production periodically ran into issues involving Weld's later publicly known difficult home life.

Her work in Dobie Gillis and the feature film The Five Pennies made Weld a star, leading to substantial publicity. She departed the series after the first year to star in features, although she was persuaded by Max Shulman to return for two guest appearances, "Birth of a Salesman" (season three, episode 21) and "What's a Little Murder Between Friends?" (season four, episode two).

Herbert Anderson was cast as Mr. Pomfritt, Dobie and Maynard's English teacher at school. Anderson appeared in a lead role in the pilot for Dennis the Menace; when that show was picked up (also by CBS), he chose to stay with that cast, and actor William Schallert appeared in the recurring role of Mr. Pomfritt through the end of season three.

Warren Beatty was cast as Milton Armitage, a recurring rival of Dobie's at his high school, during the first half of season one. Hickman later recalled that Beatty "looked at me like I was a bug" while on set. Beatty did remain friends with his brief co-star Michael J. Pollard. The two co-starred in Bonnie and Clyde eight years later. He quit the series in September 1959, midway through production of the first season after filming his fifth and final Dobie episode, "The Smoke-Filled Room", to appear in A Loss of Roses on Broadway.

Former child actress Sheila James, who, playing daughter "Jackie" on The Stu Erwin Show, had worked with Dwayne Hickman on that series and The Bob Cummings Show, was cast without an audition as Zelda Gilroy, the tomboyish brainy girl who was in love with Dobie. Originally intended as a one-shot character for the episode "Love is a Science" (season one, episode three), Max Shulman liked both Zelda and Sheila James and had Zelda retained as a semiregular character. Signing a contract with Dobie Gillis necessitated James, then an 18-year-old college student, changing her major from theater to English, so Shulman could assist her with her studies on set.

After the third season of Dobie Gillis, Rod Amateau and Max Shulman produced a pilot for a Zelda spinoff starring Sheila James as Zelda Gilroy, with Joe Flynn and Jean Byron cast as her parents. However, CBS president James Aubrey lingered over moving forward with the Zelda series for a long time before firmly rejecting the series, with Amateau telling James in private that Aubrey had found Zelda (and by extension James, then a closeted lesbian) "too butch". James' contract for the pilot and the resulting waiting period caused her to be absent from much of the fourth and final season of Dobie Gillis, though Amateau was able to hire her to return as Zelda for four episodes towards the end of the season. Acting roles became sparse for James by the late 1960s; she went into law and politics under her birth name of Sheila Kuehl, and later became the first openly gay person elected to the California State Legislature.

Steve Franken, a 28-year-old character actor, was cast immediately after Beatty's departure as Chatsworth Osbourne, Jr., a replacement character for Milton Armitage. While both Milton and Chatsworth were rich rivals of Dobie Gillis's (and both characters shared the same actress, Doris Packer, for a mother) and were, according to canon, cousins, where Beatty's Milton was a menacing and athletic physical threat, Franken's pompous, foppish Chatsworth tended to plot and scheme his way through competitions with Dobie, more often than not using his riches to get ahead. The Chatsworth character became popular enough that the producers had to consciously limit his appearances on the series to roughly one per month to prevent Franken from upstaging Hickman and Denver, but Franken stated both during and after Dobie Gillis that playing Chatsworth led him to be typecast and stifled his career.

Young actor Bobby Diamond was brought on at the beginning of season four as Dobie's teenaged cousin, Duncan "Dunky" Gillis. By 1962, the 28-year-old Dwayne Hickman had begun to look too mature to carry the teenager-based plot lines, and instead Diamond's "Dunky" was given this material, with the older yet immature Maynard as a running partner. The character was dropped midway through the fourth season, with attention shifting back to the characters of Dobie, Maynard, Chatsworth, and Zelda for the remaining episodes of the series.

Actresses who played Dobie's love interests included Cheryl Holdridge, Michele Lee, Susan Watson, Marlo Thomas, Sally Kellerman, Ellen Burstyn (then billed as Ellen McRae), Barbara Babcock, Sherry Jackson, and Danielle De Metz. Yvonne Craig appeared in the opening credits and the closing sequence of the pilot film used to sell the series to CBS, but did not appear in the actual episode, "Caper at The Bijou", when it was broadcast. She eventually played five different girlfriends on the show, more than any other actress.

Actress Sherry Alberoni, an original Mickey Mouse Club "Mouseketeer", played one of Zelda Gilroy's sisters in the 1960 episode "Dobie Spreads a Rumor".

== Other media ==
After the first season of The Many Loves of Dobie Gillis had aired, Capitol Records attempted to make a recording star out of Dwayne Hickman, ignoring the fact that Hickman, by his own admission, was not a singer. Recording engineers had to piece together numerous takes to get a usable vocal track from Hickman for each song. Hickman introduced several of the songs from the Dobie! album on the show during its second season, including "I'm a Lover, Not a Fighter" and "Don't Send a Rabbit". Earlier, while Hickman was appearing on Love That Bob, he had recorded a single, "School Dance", for ABC-Paramount Records, but both the single and the later Capitol album sold very few copies.

DC Comics published a Many Loves of Dobie Gillis comic book that ran for 26 issues from 1960 to 1964, featuring artwork by Bob Oksner. Stories from this comic-book series were later reprinted, with updates to the artwork and lettering to remove any references to Dobie Gillis, by DC as a short-lived series titled Windy and Willy in 1969.

== Sequel films ==
The program spawned two sequels produced by 20th Century Fox, the pilot Whatever Happened to Dobie Gillis? (1977) and the TV movie Bring Me the Head of Dobie Gillis (1988). Whatever Happened to Dobie Gillis? was an unsuccessful pilot for a new weekly sitcom series, which was produced, directed, and developed by James Komack after creator Max Shulman was fired from the production. It was broadcast by CBS on May 10, 1977, as a one-shot special. In the pilot, Dobie had married Zelda and is helping his father Herbert run the Gillis Grocery when Maynard comes back to Central City from his world travels. Depressed over turning 40 and not living the life he had imagined as a teenager, Dobie goes to his beloved Thinker statue and attempts to destroy it, landing in jail. The production starred Dwayne Hickman, Bob Denver, Sheila James, Frank Faylen, and Steven Paul as Dobie and Zelda's teenaged son Georgie, who was a lot like Dobie had been at his age.

Bring Me the Head of Dobie Gillis, first aired as the CBS Sunday Movie on February 21, 1988, was directed and co-written by Stanley Z. Cherry after Dwayne Hickman, who was the film's producer, was forced by the network to fire Max Shulman and Rod Amateau, with whom he had originally conceived the film. The plot features the married Dobie and Zelda running the Gillis Grocery—now also a pharmacy—on their own, Dobie's parents having died. Meanwhile, Thalia (played by Connie Stevens after Weld declined to reprise the role) returns to Central City—with Maynard, whom she has rescued from a deserted island (a homage to Gilligan's Island)—after 20 years. She offers a $50,000 bounty to anyone who will kill Dobie when he refuses to divorce Zelda and marry her. Hickman, Denver, and James returned for Bring Me the Head of Dobie Gillis, which featured Steve Franken as Chatsworth, William Schallert as Mr. Pomfritt, and Scott Grimes as son Georgie Gillis. Connie Stevens' daughter, Tricia Leigh Fisher, played Chatsworth's daughter Chatsie, who chased Georgie Gillis with the same zeal Zelda had once used chasing Dobie.

== Home media ==
On July 2, 2013, Shout! Factory released The Many Loves of Dobie Gillis – The Complete Series on DVD in Region 1. The set included all 147 episodes of the series, plus the original prenetwork version of the pilot and appearances by Dwayne Hickman and Bob Denver on other television programs of the time. Whatever Happened to Dobie Gillis? and Bring Me the Head of Dobie Gillis were not included, the latter due to music clearances, and the former because the master copy could not be located. The first season of the show was also made available on Amazon Prime Video on this date.

Shout! subsequently released each season individually, season one on September 10, 2013, season two on January 14, 2014, season three on May 6, 2014 and the fourth and final season on December 16, 2014.

In addition to the physical releases, all episodes of Dobie Gillis are also available on the streaming services Shout! Factory TV, Amazon Prime Video, Tubi, and Vudu.

== In popular culture ==
The Many Loves of Dobie Gillis was a major influence on the characters for another successful CBS program, the Hanna-Barbera Saturday morning cartoon Scooby-Doo, Where Are You!, which ran on the network from 1969 to 1970 followed by several spin-offs. As confirmed by series creators Joe Ruby and Ken Spears and writer Mark Evanier, the four teenaged lead characters of Scooby-Doo were based on four of the lead characters from Dobie Gillis: Fred Jones on Dobie, Daphne Blake on Thalia, Velma Dinkley on Zelda, and Shaggy Rogers on Maynard.

Garry Marshall said that he drew inspiration from Dobie Gillis when he created the ABC sitcom Happy Days.

Singer-songwriter Dobie Gray's stage name served as a reference to the Dobie Gillis character.
