= Rod Amateau =

American screenwriter, film and television director (1923–2003)

- Born: Rodney Amateau; December 20, 1923; New York City, New York, U.S.
- Died: June 29, 2003 (aged 79); Los Angeles, California, U.S.
- Other name: Rodney Amateau
- Occupations: Film and television screenwriter, director, and producer
- Years active: 1950–1989
- Spouses: Coleen Gray (m. 1945; div. 1949) Joane Andre (m. 1950; div. 1959) Sandra Burns (m. 1959; div. 1962)
- Children: 4

Rodney Amateau (December 20, 1923 – June 29, 2003) was an American film and television screenwriter, director, and producer.

== Early life ==
Amateau was born in New York City, the son of the rabbi Albert Jean Amateau (1888–1996) and Rebecca Amateau (née Nahum, 1894–1976).

== Career ==
Among the programs that he directed were The Dennis Day Show, The George Burns and Gracie Allen Show, The Bob Cummings Show, The Many Loves of Dobie Gillis, Mister Ed, Gilligan's Island and The New Phil Silvers Show. He produced My Mother the Car and Supertrain, and wrote the story for the 1988 film Sunset. Amateau also directed a few episodes of The Dukes of Hazzard, and appeared in a handful of episodes as an actor as well.

In 1987, he directed, produced and co-wrote The Garbage Pail Kids Movie, which is considered to be one of the worst films ever made.

== Personal life ==
From 1945 to 1949, he was married to actress Coleen Gray, who sued him for child support in 1955. Amateau was then married to actress and screenwriter Joane Andre from 1950 to 1959. From 1959 to 1962, he was married to Sandra Burns, daughter of George Burns and Gracie Allen.

Amateau had four children, two sons and two daughters.

== Retirement and death ==
Amateau retired from directing in 1989. He died from a cerebral hemorrhage in 2003 in Los Angeles, aged 79.

== Filmography ==
=== Film ===
Year	Title	Director	Producer	Writer
1952	The Bushwhackers	☒		☒
1952	Monsoon	☒		
1969	Hook, Line & Sinker			☒
1970	Pussycat, Pussycat, I Love You	☒		☒
1971	The Statue	☒		
1972	Where Does It Hurt?	☒		☒
1975	The Wilby Conspiracy			☒
1976	Drive-In	☒		☒
1978	The Seniors	☒		
1979	Son of Hitler	☒		
1984	Lovelines	☒		
1987	The Garbage Pail Kids Movie	☒	☒	☒
1988	Sunset			☒

=== TV ===
Year	Title
1955–1959	The Bob Cummings Show
1956–1958	The George Burns and Gracie Allen Show
1959–1963	The Many Loves of Dobie Gillis
1961–1966	Mister Ed
1963–1964	The New Phil Silvers Show
1965–1966	My Mother the Car
1965–1966	O.K. Crackerby
1979–1985	The Dukes of Hazzard
1979	Supertrain (season 1, episode 2: "And a Cup of Kindness, Too")
1983	High School U.S.A.
