= The Many Loves of Dobie Gillis season 3 =

The Many Loves of Dobie Gillis
- Season 3
- No. of episodes: 36

Release
- Original network: CBS
- Original release: October 10, 1961 – June 25, 1962

Season chronology
- ← Previous; Season 2 Next → Season 4

This is a list of episodes from the third season of The Many Loves of Dobie Gillis; the series' on-screen title was shortened to Dobie Gillis during this season.

This season begins with the enrollment of Dobie Gllis, Maynard G. Krebs, and Zelda Gilroy at Central City's S. Peter Pryor Junior College, after Dobie's and Maynard's discharges from the U.S. Army. The rest of the episodes of the season feature the trio adjusting to college life, and Dobie continuing to deal with life with his parents, Herbert and Winifred Gillis, and working in (or trying not to work in) his father's grocery store.

== Broadcast history ==
The season originally aired Tuesdays at 8:30-9:00 pm (EST) on CBS from October 10, 1961 to June 26, 1962.

== Nielsen ratings ==
The season ranked twenty-first with a 22.9 rating.

== DVD release ==
The Region 1 DVD of the entire series was released on July 2, 2013.

== Cast ==
=== Main ===
- Dwayne Hickman as Dobie Gillis
- Frank Faylen as Herbert T. Gillis (29 episodes)
- Florida Friebus as Winifred "Winnie" Gillis (21 episodes)
- Bob Denver as Maynard G. Krebs

=== Recurring ===
- Sheila James as Zelda Gilroy (10 episodes)
- Steve Franken as Chatsworth Osborne, Jr. (7 episodes)
- William Schallert as Professor Leander Pomfritt (10 episodes)
- Doris Packer as Mrs. Chatsworth Osbourne, Sr. (4 episodes)
- Jean Byron as Dr. Imogene Burkhart (4 episodes)
- Tuesday Weld as Thalia Menninger (1 special guest appearance)

== Episodes ==
No. overall	No. in season	Title	Directed by	Written by	Original release date	Prod. code
76	1	"The Ruptured Duck"	Rod Amateau	Max Shulman	October 10, 1961	5401
Dobie and Maynard are honorably discharged from the Army and Lt. Merriwether (Richard Clair) gives them their papers. While Dobie enjoyed being in the Army, he is looking forward to civilian life. Maynard on the other hand is not as they will now have to find jobs. Winnie and Zelda are eagerly waiting for the boys return. Mr. Pomfritt tells Herbert that he now works at S. Peter Pryor Junior College. Winnie says that tuition is free and anyone who has a high school diploma can get in. Zelda wants to marry Dobie and Herbert wants him to be partners in the store. Dobie wants to go to college, but he knows his grades weren't good enough and he has no money. The junior college is mentioned and Pomfritt is not thrilled about teaching Dobie and Maynard again. Dean Magruder (Raymond Bailey) welcomes the new students and tells them about their freshman orientation guide. Dobie goes to see Mr. Wurts (John Fiedler), the freshman advisor. Wurts has a unique way of deciding which classes to take. Next Dobie and Maynard are to meet their college "big brother". Maynard meets Tyler Cruikshank (Hal England) and is excited to have a brother. Dobie, Maynard and Zelda tell Mr. Pomfritt they'll take whatever classes he's teaching. Dobie is having second thoughts about college. Zelda has Dobie read the last page of the guide and Dobie decides to stay in school.
77	2	"Dobie, Dobie, Who's Got the Dobie?"	Rod Amateau	Story by : Rod Amateau; Teleplay by : Les Pine	October 17, 1961	5404
Dobie and Phyllis (Bennye Gatteys) are going together and are making plans for getting married. Dobie suggests that Phyllis will have to quit school to get a job. Dobie will continue studying to be able to become a good provider. Zelda finds a way for Phyllis to break up with Dobie. Dobie would now like to go out with Maryann Krolisch, but knows he doesn't have a chance with her. Dobie is surprised when Maryann wants to be with him and says they're practically engaged. Maryann tells Zelda that if she, the smartest girl in school, wants Dobie, there must be something special in him. Dobie knows that Zelda is going to try and break them up. After a couple attempts, Zelda tells Dobie she's giving up, but she's not really. Zelda's next ploy is to make Dobie and Maryann think she'll wind up by herself and lonely, hoping they will feel sorry for her. Maryann does feel sorry for Zelda and can't go out with Dobie. Dobie asks Herbert for advice, but doesn't really get any he can use. Dobie and Maryann go to the malt shop and there is Zelda, dressed in black, crying. Maryann just can't bear to see Zelda like that and she breaks up with Dobie. Zelda tells Dobie he's stuck with her.
78	3	"Move Over, Perry Mason"	Rod Amateau	Story by : Rod Amateau; Teleplay by : Dean Riesner	October 24, 1961	5402
Dobie tells Herbert that in his law class, Prof. Brinkerhoff (Douglass Dumbrille) says everyone is protected by the law. Maynard is always slipping on street car tracks and today he fell down a manhole. Herbert says he should sue the city. Maynard gets his hand caught in a gumball machine in Herbert's store. Because he sprained his hand, Maynard mentions suing Herbert, but changes his mind. At school, Brinkerhoff thinks Maynard should get money from Herbert's insurance company. Dobie and Maynard go to see Chester L. Wayzack (Charles Lane), the lawyer for the insurance company. Chester says they won't settle the claim as Maynard is accident prone. Dobie says they'll take it to court and he asks Brinkerhoff to take the case. In court, things are not going well for Maynard. Wayzack brings in several people that testify to Maynard's clumsiness. However, when Wayzack also gets his hand stuck in the gumball machine, Maynard wins his case. The Judge awards him $1.65. At the grocery store, Herbert had the gumball machine fixed. Maynard gets his hand caught in it again. C. Lindsay Workman as Mr. Fortescue.
79	4	"The Fast, White Mouse"	Rod Amateau	Max Shulman	October 31, 1961	5405
Prof. K. Farrington (Hugh Sanders) explains about the heredity factor using a smart white mouse and a dumb white mouse in a maze. Dobie comes up with an idea to get rid of Zelda. Dobie tells Zelda that his inferior genes will result in the possibility of stupid children. Dobie says that Zelda must find a worthy and intelligent mate. Zelda reluctantly agrees. Dobie tries to convince Chatsworth, the smartest boy in class, that Zelda is perfect for him. Chatsworth is not interested. Zelda goes to talk with Clarissa Osborne and she convinces her that she is the best person to keep the Osborne line going. Dobie is a little disappointed at how happy Zelda and Chatsworth are together. Dobie admits to Maynard that he actually misses Zelda and wants her back. Dobie goes to talk to Farrington about heredity again. Zelda continues to have a great time with Chatsworth. Dobie comes up with a plan to over feed the smart mouse so it doesn't perform well. Turns out Zelda and Farrington had the same idea. Zelda wants Dobie back and Farrington actually wanted to help.
80	5	"The Gigolo"	Rod Amateau	Joel Kane	November 7, 1961	5406
Dobie makes advances towards Bernadine (Diane Jergens) because her boyfriend Roger (Bill Bixby) has been at Princeton for three months. She turns him down and then goes to ask Maynard to take her to the dance. It turns out that Maynard has become a hot commodity. Because no man could ever be jealous of him, Maynard serves as girls' escorts to social events while their boyfriends are away. And he makes money doing so. Dobie fears that this is changing Maynard as he's starting to wear fancy clothes and goes to expensive restaurants. Dobie and his parents try to bring Maynard back to his old self. Bernadine still tries to tempt Maynard. Things go back and forth and finally Dobie tells Maynard he needs to make a choice. Maynard chooses Dobie. Roger comes back with a new girlfriend named Abigail. Bernadine now goes out with Dobie. Maynard would hate to think that Dobie did it all just to get Bernadine for himself. Dobie has to break it off with Bernadine.
81	6	"Dig, Dig, Dig"	Rod Amateau	Max Shulman	November 14, 1961	5407
Despite getting good grades, Herbert thinks Dobie is taking easy classes because there are girls in them. Dobie says he's taking these classes to find what he really wants. He tells his parents he wants to take a class in Egyptology. Dobie wants some money from Herbert to go on a class field trip to Egypt. Herbert goes to the Egyptology class to see what girl Dobie is interested in. There are no girls in the class, but then in walks beautiful Dr. Imogene Burkhart, the teacher. Herbert is worried that Dobie is falling for this older woman. Later, Herbert goes to talk to Imogene and she says she has no romantic interest in Dobie. After Dobie says that Imogene is very good looking, Herbert goes to talk to her again. He won't let Dobie go to Egypt with her. She says that Dobie wants to go very badly and she'll stay home. Herbert tells Dobie that Imogene isn't going on the trip. Dobie still wants to go because he's really is into Egyptology. Realizing he was wrong about Dobie, Herbert goes to see Imogene one more time and tells her he was wrong and she should go. Herbert goes back to Imogene several more times with other requests. Maynard gets a letter from Dobie in Egypt and Herbert starts to worry about Dobie and Imogene again. Nora Marlowe as Charwoman. Note: Based on Max Shulman's short story "You Think You've Got Troubles?" First appearance of Jean Byron as Dr. Imogene Burkhart.
82	7	"Eat, Drink and Be Merry...For Tomorrow, Ker-Boom!"	Guy Scarpitta	Teleplay by: Lawrence & Maggie Williams & Joel Kane; Story by Lawrence Williams & Maggie Williams	November 21, 1961	5408
Dr. Burkhart tells her class that the base of the statue of the school's founder will be replaced. She would like to place a time capsule in the base. Imogene would like everyone to bring special items to be placed inside. Dean Magruder will make the final decisions. Maynard refuses because he believes that within a matter of years the world will go "boom, boom, ker-boom!" Dobie tries to tell Maynard that there's good in the world. Because Maynard feeds the owls in Dr. Burkhart's biology lab, he would have access to the test questions she will be giving. Chatsworth would like Maynard to "borrow" them. Chatsworth says the world won't be around much longer so what's the difference. Meanwhile, Dobie and Zelda are trying to pick what they'll put in the capsule. Maynard does take the test questions. It's time for Dean Magruder to pick the items. Maynard tells him he brought nothing because no one will be around to open the capsule. The workman (Albert Cavens) who is replacing the base finds a time capsule already there. There's a newspaper in there from 1911 that predicts all sorts of bad things. Everyone tells Maynard that despite all that bad news, the world is still here. Maynard decides to put a note in the capsule that says things aren't that bad. Chatsworth and Maynard decide to put the test questions back without looking at them.
83	8	"The Richest Squirrel in Town"	Rod Amateau	Story by : Max Shulman; Teleplay by : Dean Riesner	November 28, 1961	5410
Maynard arrives at school in a taxi. He tells Dobie a squirrel gave him $41.37. In class, Mr. Pomfritt says he had $41.37 stolen from his desk. Dobie thinks that Maynard took it and wants him to give it back. Maynard, as usual, is confused and Dobie doesn't want to talk to him anymore. Dobie asks Herbert for the money so he can get Maynard out of trouble. Dobie and Maynard sneak into Pomfritt's classroom to put the money back and are caught by Pomfritt. Pomfritt is shocked that Dobie took the money and then tries to accuse Maynard of doing it. Dobie keeps trying to tell Pomfritt he didn't do it. Pomfritt goes to talk to Herbert and Winnie and tells them what Dobie did. Pomfritt thinks that maybe Dobie did it because there was trouble at home. He thinks Herbert should be more of a buddy to Dobie. Dobie comes by the grocery store and Herbert goes overboard trying to be closer to him. The next day in class the students witness a squirrel take some papers out of Pomfritt's desk. Dobie and Maynard tell Pomfritt what happened and they all realize that they jumped to conclusions too quickly.
84	9	"The Second Most Beautiful Girl in the World"	Guy Scarpitta	Max Shulman	December 5, 1961	5409
Dobie sees and instantly falls for Sally Bean (Carolyn Craig). She agrees to have dinner with him that evening but tells him she also has another date. Herbert gives Dobie more money than he asked for in hopes of Dobie actually getting a girl to stay with him. Dobie goes to Sally's house and meets her parents, Mr. (John Fiedler) and Mrs. Bean (Maxine Stuart). Mr. Bean explains that because Sally is so soft-hearted, she can only date two boys at the same time so she can evaluate them on their merits rather than emotion. Dobie learns the other boy is Chatsworth. During the date, Dobie thinks Chatsworth is too much competition and leaves. Chatsworth brings Sally home and she tells him she'd rather be with Dobie. Chatsworth doesn't need her as he has everything. When Chatsworth tells Dobie he's not interested in Sally, Dobie talks Maynard into going on a date with him and Sally. But during the date, Sally and Maynard spend the whole night talking about animals. Dobie leaves. The next day, Maynard tells Dobie that he and Sally are engaged. Later, Maynard tells Dobie he broke it off with Sally because she kissed him. Note: Based loosely on one of Max Shulman's short stories.
85	10	"This Town Ain't Big Enough for Me and Robert Browning"	Rod Amateau	Max Shulman	December 12, 1961	5411
Mr. Pomfritt's class is studying the works of Robert Browning. Pomfritt mentions the phrase "A man's reach should exceed his grasp, or what's a heaven for". This inspires Dobie to go after beautiful, popular, but slightly dimwitted and vain Poppy Jordan. Zelda warns Dobie that if he goes after Poppy and fails, she won't be there when he comes crawling back. Dobie still asks Poppy out. Dobie asks Herbert for some money and Herbert tells him a man should know his limitations. When Dobie decides to give up on Poppy, Pomfritt gives him a pep talk. Dobie still believes that if he does fail, Zelda will take him back. Dobie and Poppy are at the malt shop and Zelda pretends to be their waiter. Poppy abruptly leaves when another guy comes to pick her up. Maynard tries talking Zelda into taking Dobie back. She tells both Maynard and Dobie goodbye. Pomfritt gives Dobie another pep talk and tells him to not give up. Dobie tells Zelda he's going to go after her and not give up.
86	11	"Have Reindeer, Will Travel"	Rod Amateau	Arnold Horwitt	December 19, 1961	5413
Maynard befriends Pepe, a poor Mexican shoeshine boy, and generously gives him $55.78. It turns out that Maynard is the treasurer of the Christmas fund and that money was to be for the Christmas school dance. It was Dobie, as Chairman, that appointed Maynard. Maynard shows up to the committee meeting without the money. Maynard won't tell Dobie what he did with the money. Dobie says that Maynard will have to get a job to pay the money back. Winnie makes Herbert give Maynard a part time job. Pepe comes into the grocery store and Herbert catches Maynard giving the boy food for free and fires him. Maynard gets a job as a department store Santa. He winds up giving a bunch of toys to a little girl who didn't believe he is a real Santa. She says she's sorry for doubting him and gives Maynard a hug and kiss. All the kids really like Maynard. Maynard gets paid and Dobie will trust him to give the students the money. Maynard sees Pepe again and gives him the money. Zelda and Dobie run into Pepe and because Zelda can speak Spanish, they find out what happened. They go to where Pepe lives and find Maynard and a large family there. The grandmother (Argentina Brunetti) says Pepe shouldn't have taken the money and she tries to give it back. Dobie tells her to keep it. The students still have a Christmas party and Pepe's family joins them. James Millhollin as Mr. Bevere.
87	12	"Crazylegs Gillis"	Rod Amateau	Story by : Max Shulman; Teleplay by : Terry Ryan & Joel Kane	December 26, 1961	5414
Dobie is crazy about Lila Watkins (Michele Lee). Lila is babysitting that evening and Dobie joins her. The five infants belong to football player Truck Horse Bronkowski (Norman Grabowski) and his wife Ethel (Joyce Van Patten). They have a class at night school. Bronk really cares about his kids to the point of maybe being dropped from school and the football team. He does want to graduate so that he can become a coach, but his kids come first. He even missed some football games. Dobie talks to Coach Murdock (Nesdon Booth) and asks him to give Bronk a break. Murdock says Bronk better be at the next game. Dobie would like Herbert to give Bronk a discount on groceries, and Winnie makes him do it. Dobie, Maynard and Lila help Ethel around the house. It's Saturday and time for the game. Bronk calls home right before kickoff and there's no answer. He doesn't know that the Gillises took his family to the game. Bronk races home. Herbert tells Dobie that he'll wear Bronk's uniform and fill in for him. The very first play, Herbert gets knocked out cold. Then Dobie fills in and gets knocked out. Maynard fills in and is knocked out. Bronk learns his family is at the game and races back. Bronk joins the game and his team wins. Bronk does graduate and gets a coaching job.
88	13	"The Blue-Tail Fly"	Rod Amateau	Arnold Horwitt	January 2, 1962	5412
Mr. Pomfritt is trying to hold class, but many of the students are listening to a folk trio outside singing "Blue-Tail Fly". And Dobie is just staring at Ursula Forbes. Pomfritt thinks today's young people should take more of an interest in political affairs. He says there's an election for student council next week and no one has been nominated. When Ursula says that she really likes boys who get involved in politics, Dobie becomes a candidate for council. Zelda offers to be Dobie's campaign manager, but he says that Ursula already has the job. Chatsworth decides to run against Dobie and he uses the folk trio to draw student crowds. Even Ursula goes to Chatsworth's side. Zelda gets Dobie to add some sex appeal and singing to his campaign and the students love it. Pomfritt is not happy with Dobie's new campaign style. He'd rather have more politics and less show business. But when Dobie tries to talk issues with the students, they all walk away. That night, Chatsworth is campaigning and singing and a police officer (Tom Reese) makes him stop. The officer sings a song and then tells the students to move along. Dobie tells everyone to stand their ground and he gets arrested and put in jail. The students raise bail for Dobie. Dobie wins the election.
89	14	"I Do Not Choose to Run"	Rod Amateau	Story by : Rod Amateau; Teleplay by : Les Pine & Joel Kane	January 9, 1962	5415
Herbert is running for city planning commissioner against George J. Cheever (John Fiedler). Dobie is helping Herbert hand out leaflets when he sees a beautiful girl. Dobie learns that she is Betty Jane Cheever, George's daughter. They take an instant liking to each other and Betty Jane says they shouldn't let politics get between them. Betty Jane tells Dobie the only reason her father is running is that he supports Proposition E. It would tear down an old slum-like neighborhood on the north side to put up new schools and parks. Dobie finds out that Herbert knows nothing about that issue or any others. When Herbert learns what Proposition E is, he is against it as he grew up in that neighborhood. Herbert tells a reporter that he wants to debate Cheever on TV. Dobie tells Herbert that Cheever is right on the issues and Herbert tells Dobie to leave. Dobie moves out and campaigns for Cheever. Cheever doesn't do well at the debate and the audience loved Herbert, despite him not saying anything of any substance. Herbert would like to find Dobie and Maynard and Betty Jane takes him to Dobie. Dobie makes Herbert understand how bad the north side is. At the second debate, Herbert supports Proposition E. Herbert now campaigns for Cheever and Cheever campaigns for Herbert. Herbert winds up winning by one vote. A demolition man tells Herbert that his store will have to come down. Herb Ellis as Charlie Mulcahey.
90	15	"Happiness Can't Buy Money"	Guy Scarpitta	Story by : Max Shulman; Teleplay by : Dean Riesner	January 16, 1962	5417
It's Chatsworth's birthday and he tries to win a lot of friends by handing out free gold watches. But when he invites the crowd to his house for a party, they all walk away. Dobie tells him that one can't buy friendship. Chatsworth admits that Dobie is well liked and wants to know how he does it. Chatsworth then comes to believe that rough and tough Herbert is just the guy to make a real man out of him. Meanwhile, Mrs. Osborne wants to take a trip to India to go tiger hunting. But she doesn't think that she can leave Chatsworth alone. Chatsworth wants to have Herbert stay at the mansion and mold him into a man. Dobie and Winnie can move in as well. Mrs. Osborne is skeptical about Chatsworth's plan. She decides to pretend to leave for her trip and hide out in the mansion and watch the goings on. She doesn't like the idea of turning Chatsworth away from the easy life. Mrs. Osborne wants her staff to show the Gillises what it's like to live the life of luxury. It's not long before Herbert and Winnie succumb to the easy life of Osborne Manor. Chatsworth understands how Herbert and Winnie could give in to temptation. Mrs. Osborne reveals herself and Chatsworth tells her that she has to stop treating him like a little boy, he's now a man. The Orsbornes have dinner at the Gillises and Chatsworth is proud when his mother helps with the dishes.
91	16	"The Magnificent Failure"	Rod Amateau	Bud Nye	January 23, 1962	5416
Herbert buys Winnie a mink coat and Dobie a convertible and Dobie wonders why. When asked where he got the money, Herbert says that he is selling his store. He thinks he'll get $35,000 for it. An executive from a supermarket chain is coming by to close the deal. Herbert wants to take a few years off and travel with Winnie. When they get back, he'll take a job as a supermarket manager. Sam Gummage (Tom Reese) from Mammoth Markets comes by. Sam offers him $6,000. Dobie and Winnie come back with a lot of things they bought. Herbert tells them that he's changed his mind about traveling and wants to get the manager's job. He goes to see Fred C. Dobbs, Jr. (James Dobson) at Swift-Thrift Supermarkets. Despite knowing Herbert since he was a child, Fred just doesn't have a job for someone of Herbert's age. Fred goes to see Winnie and she tells him Herbert sold the store for a lot of money. Fred calls Sam and finds out what the real offer was and Winnie and Dobie now know. Dobie and Winnie know they have to return all the gifts and they tell Herbert they know the truth. Friends and family make Herbert feel better. Herb Ellis as Mr. Hogan.
92	17	"For Whom the Wedding Bell Tolls"	Stanley Z. Cherry	Arnold Horwitt	January 30, 1962	5418
Dobie is standing in for his friend Eddie in a wedding-by-proxy with Jane Bailey (Betty Rollin). Eddie is working in South America. Zelda and Maynard are also at the wedding. Zelda tells Dobie sooner or later they'll be getting married. Jane announces that everyone is invited to her bon voyage party on the boat she'll be taking to South America. Zelda catches the bouquet. On the boat, Dobie tells Maynard that one day he will get married and it might even be Zelda. But he's not ready yet. Dobie figures if he were gone for a while, Zelda would look for someone else. Dobie decides to stow away on the boat and Maynard wants to go as well. Zelda tells Jane she'll stow away and then she hopes it will make Dobie's heart grow fonder for her. Without them knowing, Zelda finds out Dobie and Maynard are on the ship. Zelda comes up with a plan. She makes sure Dobie hears her flirting with several different men, hoping to make him jealous. Zelda uses her new found skill of impersonation to get Dobie to actually propose to her. Captain Lopez starts the wedding cerenmony. Zelda feels guilty for tricking Dobie and confesses to what she did. Dobie tells her that they may still get married, just not yet. David Frankham as Derek.
93	18	"Girls Will Be Boys"	Rod Amateau	Joel Kane	February 13, 1962	5414
Dobie's newest girl is Stephanie Trowbridge. Dobie doesn't like to leave Maynard alone so he invites him on his date with Stephanie. She's not happy about it and then suggests they find a date for Maynard. Maynard then meets Edwina "Eddie" Kegel (Lynn Loring), a tomboy who enjoys all of the things that he does. Dobie is worried because Maynard and Eddie don't go on traditional romantic dates. He asks Herbert to talk to Maynard. Maynard tells Dobie and Herbert he likes Eddie because with her he can be himself. Dobie gives Maynard two tickets to the sophomore spring dance. Maynard and Eddie decide to go just to laugh at the others. It's the night of the dance and both Maynard and Eddie are dressed up. Walter Funk asks Eddie to dance and Maynard insists she do it. Then Jerry cuts in. Eddie starts to enjoy being treated like a girl and becomes the hit of the evening. Maynard leaves and Eddie finds him. Eddie explains that the girl was always inside her and she finally came out. Eddie tells Maynard that one day he'll change also and will be happy. Later, Maynard wants to take flowers and candy to Eddie, but Dobie tells him she's going steady with Walter.
94	19	"The Marriage Counselor"	Rod Amateau	Story by : Rod Amateau; Teleplay by : Les Pine	February 20, 1962	5421
Dobie asks Barbara Jean to marry him and Zelda overhears it. Zelda manages to talk Barbara Jean out of it. Zelda decides that she needs to sell herself better to Dobie. Professor Pomfritt is discussing the benefits of marriage in his class. Dobie asks Barbara Jean if she agrees with the benefits and she says she does. She says she's going to accept a proposal she got from a guy in the Navy. Dobie, who wants a happy and prosperous life, now believes that marriage to Zelda will achieve that. Dobie tells an ecstatic Zelda he'll marry her. Dobie's parents don't want him to rush into anything and say to take a couple days to think it over. Herbert and Winnie go to see Pomfritt and he says he'll talk to Dobie and Zelda. Pomfritt comes up with academic questions to a happy marriage and Herbert counters with made up real life situations. Pomfritt concludes that Dobie and Zelda have every chance at a happy marriage. Zelda wants to hear Maynard's reasons why they shouldn't marry. When Zelda asks Dobie why he wants to marry, he never mentions the word love. She'll give time for Dobie to be more romantic and calls off the wedding.
95	20	"The Big Blunder and Egg Man"	Rod Amateau	Story by: Bud Nye; Teleplay by: Bud Nye & Max Shulman	February 27, 1962	5430
Dobie's latest love interest is beautiful Daphne Winsett (Cheryl Holdridge). Daphne tells Winnie and Herbert that she and Dobie are a mismatch because Dobie likes art and culture and she loves business and commerce. She hangs around with Dobie though because he's good looking, he's a good dancer, and he does her homework. To impress Daphne, Dobie will take a class in economics which is temporarily being taught by Mr. Pomfritt. Daphne tells Pomfritt that the class is studying commodities and she is investing in egg futures. They're not using real money, it's only on paper. Daphne doesn't think Dobie will understand the class. Dobie decides that he'll invest in what Daphne does, but use real money to show her he can get rich. Dobie gets $500 by pawning Winnie's fur coat and goes to see a broker. Egg prices rise and Dobie thinks everything is going great. After several days, Winnie asks about her coat and Dobie says he'll have a surprise for her. In class, Daphne says that she sold her futures because if she held on to it after a certain day, she would have to take delivery of the eggs. Dobie now will own 15,000 dozen eggs and have to pay $4500. Dobie tells his parents what he did. He then tells Pomfritt he's quitting school to get a job to pay for everything. With the help of Pomfritt and Dean Magruder, Dobie is able to unload a part of the eggs.
96	21	"Birth of a Salesman"	Rod Amateau	Arnold Horwitt	March 6, 1962	5426
Mary Ellen breaks up with Dobie. Thalia Menninger (Tuesday Weld) suddenly shows up. She's a traveling saleswoman for the Pylon Corporation, which sells clothing door-to-door. Next week she will be promoted to district manager of their Cleveland office. Dobie agrees to go out with her on Saturday night. On the date, Thalia says she still cares for Dobie but she knows he'll still never earn the kind of money she wants. She suggests he quit school and take a salesman job at her company. Dobie asks Mr. Pomfritt for his advice and he recommends staying in school. Herbert thinks Dobie should take the job. Thalia tells Dobie she'll talk to Pomfritt. After Thalia sees Pomfritt mediate some things on the phone, she offers him an executive position in her company. Despite having problems making ends meet, he turns her down. Knowing that Thalia really does care about Dobie, Pomfritt says he'll tell Dobie to make up his own mind about quitting. Dobie decides to take the job. Separately, Pomfritt also thinks about Thalia's offer. After talking to each other, both Dobie and Pomfritt decide to stay in school. Thalia tells Dobie she enrolled in the college.
97	22	"Like, Oh, Brother!"	Guy Scarpitta	Story by: Arnold Horwitt; Teleplay by: Arnold Horwitt & Joel Kane	March 13, 1962	5422
Dobie and Maynard are failing Dr. Burkhart's sociology class. If they "volunteer" to act as big brothers for disadvantaged adolescent boys at the River Street Settlement House, they may remain in the class. Dobie mentions the house is in the roughest neighborhood in town and he's concerned about going there. The boys are not thrilled to see Dobie and Maynard. Meanwhile, Committee President Hawley (Richard Reeves) tells Dr. Burkhart that if they don't get more boys, they will have to close the Settlement House. Burkhart asks for more time. Burkhart has a hard time translating her academic thoughts into something the boys can understand. The boys all leave. When Maynard tells Burkhart she's going about it all wrong, she tells him to leave. Maynard meets up with the boys and they get along great. Burkhart apologizes to Maynard and tells him and Dobie that the settlement will likely be closed down. Maynard talks the boys into coming back to the house. Hawley witnesses Burkhart talking to the boys in a way that they can understand. Hawley is very pleased that Burkhart and the boys are making progress. Rich Correll as Pete. Garry Walberg as Committeeman Klug.
98	23	"Dobie Gillis: Wanted Dead or Alive"	Rod Amateau	Max Shulman	March 20, 1962	5424
Dobie's latest love interest is Giselle Hurlbut. She tells him that she's leaving him because he has no prospects, no bright future and he's not rich. Giselle's family needs money and she'll have to find a guy with money at an Ivy League school. Dobie is now depressed and Mr. Pomfritt would like to help. Dobie and Maynard meet Pomfritt's wife Maude (Joyce Van Patten). Maude complains to Leander that he's always busy with school stuff and never has time for her. She insists they go out that evening. Dobie wants money from Herbert to go to Harvard. There Dobie could meet a rich guy whose father might give him a high paying job. Herbert daydreams that Dobie meets Henry Cabot Loot, Jr. (Hal England) at Harvard. Henry's father, Henry Cabot Loot, Sr. (Stafford Repp), gives Dobie a job with a salary of $1 million a year. Giselle reminds Dobie he'll need good grades to get into Harvard. Maude talks Dobie and Maynard into babysitting the Pomfritts' children. Maynard finds the test questions that Pomfritt is to give the next day. After class, Pomfritt would like to know how Dobie and Maynard got perfect scores on the test. The boys confess to cheating and Pomfritt's faith in them has been restored. Giselle tells Dobie that something happened so that her sisters don't need money anymore, so she can stay and be with him. Note: A remake of "Room at the Bottom" from Season 1.
99	24	"Names My Mother Called Me"	Rod Amateau	Lawrence Williams, Maggie Williams & Max Shulman	March 27, 1962	5423
Dobie wonders how he got his name and Herbert tells him that Winnie picked it out. Winnie won't reveal why she picked the name. Giselle Hurlbut, the girl Dobie loves, has their whole life planned out after college. But she wants him to change his name and by the next day. Maynard tells Dobie that Dr. D.W. Kline (Russell Collins), the Nobel Prize-winning scientist, sent Dobie a telegram. Kline would like Dobie to come to New York City to discuss something they have in common. Winnie reveals that Kline's first name is Dobie and that's who Dobie's named after. She did it because of all the good things the doctor had done. Winnie has also been writing him letters about Dobie's progress as the doctor had no children of his own. The newspaper states that Kline is retiring and will leave civilization to start a hospital in the jungles of Brazil. Giselle still wants Dobie to change his name. In New York, Dr. Charles Graham (Max Showalter) tells a newscaster that Kline is not giving a formal goodbye and will only talk to one person, Dobie Gillis. Dobie, Maynard and Herbert arrive and Dobie is taken to see Kline. Kline shows Dobie a book of clippings about Dobie and says it's very important to him. Kline wants to know what the world wants out of life and Dobie says happiness. Kline wants Dobie to give a goodbye to the world for him and sneaks out the back. Dobie tells everyone what he thinks Kline would have liked to say. Back at home, Dobie tells Giselle he won't change his name. She says that's OK and introduces her fiancé to Dobie.
100	25	"An American Strategy"	Rod Amateau	Story by : Max Shulman; Teleplay by : Dean Riesner	April 3, 1962	5428
Dobie's latest girlfriend is Gloria Mundy (Nancy McCarthy), a coffee girl at Lumpkin Lumber. She helps him get a job at the lumberyard. Dobie was expecting a white-collar job, but C.J. Erdlatz (Paul Bryar) tells him he'll have the blue-collar job of sweeping up sawdust. Dobie hopes to get ahead by using a little initiative and almost gets fired. Gloria helps Dobie keep his job. Dobie then sees Pamela Lumpkin (Maggie Pierce), the boss's daughter, and falls for her. She likes him as well. Dobie also hopes that she can further his career. Pamela introduces Dobie to her parents, Woodrow and Irma Lumpkin (Eleanor Audley). She gets Woodrow to put Dobie in the Junior Executive training program. Gloria finds out about Pamela. Dobie is to attend a Charity Costume Bazaar thrown by Irma. While there, Dobie runs into Gloria, who is waitressing. Gloria makes Dobie realize he was just using Pamela. Dobie breaks it off with Pamela, but she says she will still be there for him. Dobie tells Gloria what he did, but she says it's just not the same and she can't be with him. Gloria does say that there is hope. But when Gloria later wants to get back with Dobie, he has a date with Pamela.
101	26	"The Truth Session"	Rod Amateau	Story by : Rod Amateau; Teleplay by : Henry Sharp & Max Shulman	April 10, 1962	5433
Dobie is at home sick in bed with a head cold. Zelda, who supposedly loves Dobie, decides to hit on new student Nate Gahagan. Nate turns her down because he believes he'll just be a back-up to Dobie. Maynard, who never lies, has to lie to Mr. Pomfritt about why he doesn't have his homework. The real reason is that Dobie didn't do it for him because he's sick. Because Pomfritt knows that Maynard never lies, he says he'll accept Maynard's fantastical excuse. Maynard decides that lying is the way to go. Zelda talks him out of it and Maynard admits to Pomfritt that he lied. Maynard's telling the truth to the extreme causes Herbert to lose a customer (Mary Jackson). It also causes Herbert and Winnie to have a fight. Zelda tells Nate that she's done with Dobie, but he tells her he needs to be with a rich girl. Zelda says that her father is rich and then Maynard comes by and says she's lying. Maynard irritates Pomfritt with his truth telling. Maynard realizes that his telling the truth is hurting people and decides to go away. When they see him with a suitcase, everyone pleads with Maynard to stay. He says he wasn't going away, he was just taking food into a triple feature at the movie theater. Note: Dwayne Hickman was sick during production and only appears during the monologues.
102	27	"I Remember Muu Muu"	David Davis	Joel Kane	April 17, 1962	5435
Dobie is in love with Sue Ellen Silnitzer (Nancy McCarthy) and this causes him to ignore Maynard. Dobie is the assistant editor of the school newspaper, the Pryor Cryer. Maynard needs Dobie's help for his journalism class, which he is flunking. If Maynard writes a paper good enough to be put in the Pryor Cryer, Mr. Pomfritt will give him a passing grade. Pomfritt wants him to write something about anthropology and sends Maynard to see Dr. Imogene Burkhart. Burkhart suggests he write about the class's reenactment of some native ritual dances. Pomfritt tells Maynard to use words that will draw in people's attention. Because Dobie is busy with Sue Ellen, he OK's Maynard's paper without even reading it. What's published is a provocative-sounding article about Dr. Burkhart's recreations of native dances. The article includes a picture of Burkhart in a bathing suit. Herbert wants to know what kind of other scandalous things happen at the school. Other parents start to get upset and want Burkhart fired. Herbert daydreams about Burkhart doing a wild exotic dance in a native outfit. Dean Magruder tells Burkhart she will get a chance to defend herself. When everyone sees the plain floral dress that Burkhart and the students were going to wear, the matter is dropped. Herbert daydreams about Winnie doing an exotic dance in a native outfit. Mary Jackson as Mrs. Grindle. Note: Dwayne Hickman was sick during production and only appears during the monologues and a few brief scenes.
103	28	"Sweet Success of Smell"	Stanley Z. Cherry	Joel Kane	April 24, 1962	5429
Professor McGuffy (Charles Lane) is demonstrating how certain animals, such as his basset hound Charlie, have a keen sense of smell. McGuffy hides a sandwich and then Maynard's powerful sense of smell finds it before Charlie. McGuffy tests Maynard and finds his sense of smell applies to anything, not just food. Elspeth Hummaker (Yvonne Craig), who is interested in money, is suddenly interested in Maynard. Dobie asks Herbert how Maynard could make money with his smelling ability. Dobie then thinks that Maynard should start a detective business and sniff out client's missing items. Dobie will be his manager. Their business is doing very well and money is coming in. Elspeth is coming on to Maynard and wants to become a partner in the business. Dobie tells Maynard to pick between the two and Maynard picks Elspeth. Elspeth has Maynard taking some unethical cases. Dobie tries to talk Maynard out of working with Elspeth. Maynard says that he's getting a cold and he can't smell anything. Elspeth leaves him and the business. Maynard tells Dobie he was just pretending to have a cold to see what Elspeth would do. They both agree to stop the business. But then Dobie learns that Maynard has an incredible sense of hearing.
104	29	"When Other Friendships Have Been Forgot"	Rod Amateau	Joel Kane	May 1, 1962	5434
Dobie's latest love interest is Caprice Pringle (Patricia McNulty). Caprice says she loves Dobie but he treats Maynard cruelly and heartlessly. It's because Maynard is so dependent on Dobie for everything, that if Dobie were no longer around, Maynard would not be able to survive on his own. Dobie realizes Caprice is right and he has to find a way to get Maynard out of his life. Even Herbert can't tell Maynard to go away. Maynard tells the Gillises that his father got transferred to Cleveland and he'll be moving away. Maynard has been gone a week and Caprice is tired of Dobie constantly worrying about him. Caprice breaks up with Dobie. Even Herbert and Winnie miss Maynard. They suggest that maybe Maynard move in with them, which is what happens. Adjusting to life with Maynard has its problems. Caprice tells Maynard that she'd like to get back together with Dobie. But something Maynard does makes Caprice change her mind. Though he was trying to help, Maynard causes Mrs. Kenny (Mary Jackson) to stop shopping at Herbert's store. Maynard tells the Gillises it would be better if he went back to his parents. He then mentions that they moved back to town several days ago. Maynard ruins another chance for Dobie and Caprice to get back together.
105	30	"I Was a Boy Sorority Girl"	Ralph Murphy	Arnold Horwitt	May 8, 1962	5427
Dobie's newest love is high class Samantha Digby, who will only date boys in her social standing. She's with Dobie because he lied and she doesn't know he's poor. Dobie needs $20 to take Samantha to the Spring Prom and Herbert won't give it to him. Dobie gets Maynard to take a job with him at the Eta Theta Sorority's open house. The pay is $10 each and Dobie would then borrow the $10 from Maynard. Mrs. Osbourne is running the event and the boys are to be waiters. She tells the boys they are not to enter the girls-only area on the second floor. What Dobie didn't expect was Samantha attending the open house as a potential pledge. Dobie has to figure out how to do his job and not be seen by Samantha. The boys wind up on the second floor and try to avoid being caught by dressing up as girls. A delivery boy tries making a pass at Maynard until Mrs. Osbourne kicks him out. The boys keep switching between their waiter's clothes and the dresses. Herbert makes a delivery, winds up on the second floor and has to wear a dress to avoid being caught by Mrs. Osbourne. But his outfit gets caught in the door and they are all found out. Dobie loses Samantha.
106	31	"It Takes a Heap o' Livin' to Make a Cave a Home"	Rod Amateau	Arnold Horwitt	May 15, 1962	5421
Maynard is awarded the Man of the Year Medal in Archaeology by Dean Magruder. Dobie tells us how this all came about. A couple weeks ago Dean Magruder is about to expel Maynard for his poor grades. Magruder will give him one more chance if he passes one class. Dr. Burkhart reluctantly agrees to let Maynard take her archaeology class. Her class is studying the Stone Age. They will go on a field trip just outside of town to the Wasatchi Caves where a tribe of Stone Age men once lived. Maynard gets separated from the group and winds up in a cave. There Maynard finds a living Wasatchi caveman who gives him a stone axe. Maynard believes his name is Ugh-ug (Mike Mazurki). Maynard takes his picture and gives it and a comic book to Ugh-ug. Maynard tells Dobie and Herbert about Ugh-ug and they think he's crazy. Dobie tells him to give Burkhart the stone axe artifact but don't mention Ugh-ug. Maynard becomes quite popular and famous for finding the thousands-of-years-old artifact. This led up to Maynard getting the award. But then Burkhart confirms through carbon dating that the axe is new. Maynard tells Burkhart and Magruder about Ugh-ug, but they don't believe him. They go out to the cave but it is sealed off. Everyone leaves but Maynard and he then finds Ugh-ug. Maynard takes the picture back to Burkhart and they now believe Maynard. Maynard talks to Ugh-ug and realizes that he would rather not be part of civilization. Maynard won't tell the others where Ugh-ug is.
107	32	"Back-To-Nature Boy"	Guy Scarpitta	Joel Kane	May 22, 1962	5437
Edwina Kegel, Dobie's latest girlfriend, wants to break up with him. She says that it's not him, she's just been feeling restless lately. They're at Chatsworth's party and Dobie learns that Edwina is a distant cousin of his. Edwina tells Chatsworth she's tired of the high society lifestyle. Maynard shows up and Edwina says he's the man she's been searching for. At first Maynard doesn't recognize her, but then he realizes she is his old tomboy friend Eddie. They leave together and Chatsworth vows to break them up. Chatsworth tells his mother that he's worried that Maynard could become part of the family. Meanwhile, Maynard and Eddie are having a carefree fun time together. Mrs. Osborne invites Maynard to the mansion with hopes of buying him off. Dobie and Eddie come by to rescue Maynard. Mrs. Osbourne then tries to at least make Maynard socially acceptable, with no luck. Dobie and Eloise McGivney (Carol Christensen) invite Maynard and Eddie to a dance. Maynard isn't interested, but Eddie is starting to miss those things. Eddie fantasizes about being old and still doing the things Maynard likes to do. Edwina decides she can't go on with Maynard's lifestyle and kisses him goodbye.
108	33	"How to Cheat an Honest Man"	Guy Scarpitta	Story by : Rod Amateau; Teleplay by : Les Pine & Joel Kane	May 29, 1962	5425
Dobie's current girlfriend is Mona Monaghan (Susan Hart). She wants to go to the dance tonight, but Dobie doesn't have the money for the tickets. Dobie tells her she shouldn't go to the dance because she needs to study for a Latin exam the next day. Mona says she'll pass because she intends to cheat. She knows he's coming up with this because he has no money. Dobie tries to talk her out of cheating but she leaves. Eloise McInerney (Diane Jergens) overheard what Dobie said and she likes his commitment to honesty. Dobie says he's honest because his father is. Meanwhile, Charlie Mulcahey (Herbert Ellis) tells Herbert he can fix his $10 traffic ticket. Dobie and Eloise come by and she learns about the ticket fixing. She now wants nothing to do with Dobie. Dobie later tells Eloise that Herbert will pay the fine. She says that if Dobie can bring a receipt for the payment, they can get together. Herbert agrees to "un-fix" the ticket. When Herbert talks to the Traffic Clerk there is some confusion and Herbert, Dobie and Maynard wind up in jail. The Police Chief eventually releases them, but is still suspicious. Eloise gives Dobie one more chance. Dobie tries to get Mona back by convincing her that he can cheat as well, but it doesn't work. Herbert comes up with a plan to get another ticket, but it backfires and he winds up with the original ticket and a new one. And Dobie still has no luck getting Eloise. Nesdon Booth as Police Officer Gogerty.
109	34	"Bachelor Father...and Son"	Stanley Z. Cherry	Joel Kane	June 5, 1962	5438
While working in the grocery store, Dobie meets Betty Sue Fosdick (Maggie Pierce) and wants to walk her home. Winnie makes Dobie get back to work. Herbert wants to go to the lodge, but Winnie makes him stay at the store. Both are happy when Winnie says she's been invited to visit her sister in Cleveland for two weeks. Winnie's worried about leaving the two, but they talk her into it. Winnie has asked neighbor Mrs. Finchley (Reta Shaw) to look in on them. Herbert and Dobie wind up not being the best of housekeepers and the place is a mess. When they learn that Mrs. Finchley won't take care of the place if Maynard's around, Herbert invites him to move in. Maynard manages to ruin things between Dobie and Betty Sue. Living with Maynard hasn't been easy, but keeping Mrs. Finchley away is worth it. Herbert and Dobie start to realize they need Winnie around. Dobie talks Betty Sue into a date and Herbert has his lodge brothers coming over, but neither has a clean shirt to wear. Dobie goes to his date wearing a heavy overcoat and Betty Sue is not impressed. Betty Sue leaves. Herbert isn't dressed any better for his friends. Dobie and Herbert decide to bear down and clean up the house, but it means no social life. When Mrs. Finchley sees how clean the house is, she'll let Winnie know she can visit for another week. Maynard brings over some of his weird possessions and his rabbits. Mrs. Finchley calls Winnie and tells her to come home right away.
110	35	"Like Low Noon"	Rod Amateau	Dean Riesner	June 12, 1962	5420
Dobie tells Maynard that a guy should stand up to a bully and call his bluff. Dobie then learns from Maynard that Butch Baumgartner is coming back to town on the noon bus. Dobie and Butch had a fight over a girl named Lorelei Lafferty. Butch then joined the Army and went to Alaska. Butch vowed to get back at Dobie if he ever returned. Herbert wants Dobie to fight and is willing to give him boxing lessons, but there's only an hour before the bus arrives. Apparently Butch was a prize fighter while in the Army. Winnie wants Dobie to leave town. Dobie goes to see Lorelei hoping she can help, but she doesn't really remember him. She's willing to help, but the timing is bad. Dobie then asks a police officer (Tom Reese) for protection. Ratsy Ruffner hears about Dobie's problem and offers his protection services. The police officer returns and Ratsy and his gang run off. The officer takes Dobie to see Judge Baumgartner (Douglass Dumbrille). The judge is Butch's father and is willing to help Dobie. Dobie thanks the judge for his offer but decides that he has to face Butch himself. Dobie goes to the bus stop and confronts Butch. Butch admires that Dobie stood up to him and they shake hands in friendship.
111	36	"The Frat's in the Fire"	Stanley Z. Cherry	Joel Kane	June 26, 1962	5403
It's club sign-up time at the college and no one seems that interested in any of the clubs. The only club that is drawing interest is the snobbish Silver Spoons Club. Dobie tells Herbert he would love to join but because of his position in life, there's no chance. Herbert says he'll do anything he can to get Dobie in. Meanwhile at the club, the members are upset about the lack of quality food. President Chatsworth tells Vice President Tyler Cruickshank (Hal England) that do to mismanagement, the food budget is in disarray. Herbert offers to supply the club with free gourmet food twice a week if they make Dobie a member. Chatsworth at first says no, but then agrees. Herbert says that Dobie must not find out about this deal. Maribelle (Bennye Gatteys) tells Dobie that if he's not a member of the Silver Spoons Club, she won't go out with him. Dobie is surprised when Chatsworth tells him he's in the club. Dobie is disappointed when he accidentally finds out how he got into the club. He tells the club he's not sure he wants to join, so he and Maynard will hang around for a couple days to see if they like it. Dobie makes the club wait on him and Maynard hand and foot. Dobie even takes Chatsworth's car and his girl, Brenda LaBelle (Marianna Hill). Before he is to tell the club whether he'll join or not, Maynard makes Dobie see that they've been acting as bad as the club members used to act. Dobie tells the club members that everyone was at fault for this charade, including himself and his father. Later, Chatsworth tells Dobie that they still want him and Maynard in the club, no strings attached. Herbert Ellis as Malcolm the Cook.
