= The Many Loves of Dobie Gillis season 2 =

The Many Loves of Dobie Gillis
- Season 2
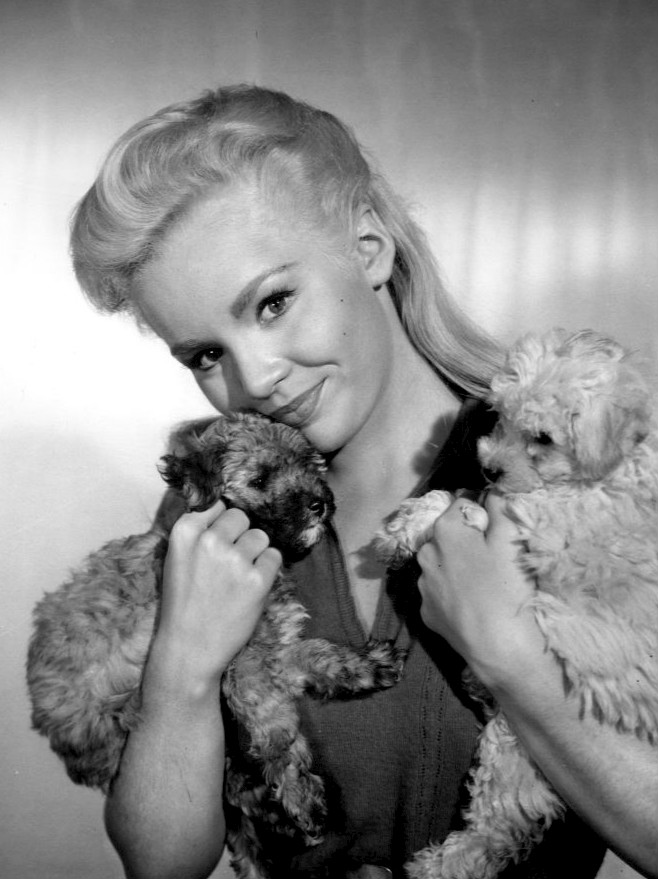
- No. of episodes: 36

Release
- Original network: CBS
- Original release: September 27, 1960 – June 27, 1961

Season chronology
- ← Previous; Season 1 Next → Season 3

This is a list of episodes from the second season of The Many Loves of Dobie Gillis; the series' on-screen title was shortened to Dobie Gillis starting with this season.

The first half of the season explores Dobie Gillis' life as a senior at Central High School. Over the course of episodes 18 through 22, Dobie and his best friend Maynard G. Krebs graduate and enlist in the US Army. The rest of the season primarily centers upon Dobie and Maynard's misadventures in basic training, with a handful of episodes featuring the characters back in their Central City hometown while on leave.

== Broadcast history ==
The season originally aired Tuesdays at 8:30-9:00 pm (EST) on CBS from September 27, 1960 to June 27, 1961.

== Nielsen ratings ==
The season ranked twenty-third with a 23.0 rating.

== DVD release ==
The Region 1 DVD of the entire series was released on July 2, 2013. A Season Two standalone set was released on January 14, 2014.

== Cast ==
=== Main ===
- Dwayne Hickman as Dobie Gillis
- Frank Faylen as Herbert T. Gillis (28 episodes)
- Florida Friebus as Winifred "Winnie" Gillis (22 episodes)
- Bob Denver as Maynard G. Krebs

=== Recurring ===
- Sheila James as Zelda Gilroy (16 episodes)
- Steve Franken as Chatsworth Osborne, Jr. (11 episodes)
- William Schallert as Mr. Leander Pomfritt (10 episodes)
- Doris Packer as Mrs. Chatsworth Osbourne, Sr. (6 episodes)
- Marjorie Bennett as Mrs. Blossom Kenney (5 episodes)
- Tommy Farrell as Riff Ryan (2 episodes)

== Episodes ==
No. overall	No. in season	Title	Directed by	Written by	Original release date	Prod. code
40	1	"Who Needs Elvis?"	Rod Amateau	Max Shulman	September 27, 1960	4401
Dobie joins the school band just to be closer to Esme Lauterbach (Kathe Green). But she wants nothing to do with him as she is 6'1" tall and Dobie is a foot shorter. Esme thinks Maynard is a genius because he can play Jazz on his horn. She wants to go steady with him, but Maynard is scared. Mr. Pomfritt, the band leader, will offer a prize to the student that writes the best original Jazz tune. Herbert tries to explain to Dobie that women are taller now because men have given them too much power. Because of something Winnie said, Dobie believes he just needs some time to grow. He would like Maynard to go steady with Esme to keep her from other guys until Dobie's taller. Things backfire when Maynard says he fallen for Esme and wants to keep her. Despite loving Dobie, Zelda has a plan to make Esme fall for Dobie. Zelda's written a Jazz tune and wants Dobie to pretend he wrote it and enter it in Mr. Pomfritt's music class contest. Zelda teaches Dobie the song and the guitar. During class, Dobie performs the song and wins both the contest and Esme. Dobie confesses that Zelda wrote the song and asks her to go steady. Note: Dwayne Hickman sings "I'm a Lover, Not a Fighter" from his Dobie! album.
41	2	"You Ain't Nothin' But a Houn' Dog"	Rod Amateau	Lawrence Williams & Maggie Williams	October 4, 1960	4402
The Daily Bugle is running a Father/Son week. Herbert is upset that Dobie has not submitted an essay for the "Why My Dad is My Best Pal" contest. Dobie has to write a paper for Mr. Pomfritt's English class about "my favorite pet". Dobie writes about a dog and gets an A on his paper. Beautiful Mason Dixon congratulates him. Mason will agree to go out with Dobie if he can come up with $25. Maynard wants to help Dobie come up with the money. He sees the essay contest in the paper and the prize is $25. Maynard decides to edit Dobie's dog paper by substituting dad for dog. A Newspaper Reporter (Jack Albertson) shows up to the grocery store and his photographer starts taking pictures. The Gillis' learn that Dobie won the contest. Herbert is very moved and wants to spend more time with Dobie. Dobie was to play tennis with Mason but he winds up playing with Herbert. Herbert wants to go fishing so Dobie has to cancel more time with Mason and she is not happy. Herbert finds Dobie's original paper about the dog. Mason tells Dobie she'll still go out with him. Herbert and Winnie overhear Dobie tell Mason he wants to use the money to buy his father something. Dobie says things are better between him and his father because of the essay even though it was about a dog. Moved, Herbert doesn't say anything about the original dog paper. Note: Herbert Gillis says "I gotta kill that boy; I just gotta" for the last time in this episode.
42	3	"Baby Talk"	Rod Amateau	Joel Kane	October 18, 1960	4405
Tomas and Eva must return to the "old country" and decide to leave their baby Katrina in the park. Maynard finds the baby. Dobie reads the note that says the baby's name and that she's one year old. Dobie thinks they should take the baby to the police. Zelda also thinks they should turn the baby in, but Maynard wants to keep it. Maynard brings the baby to school in a knapsack on his back. Things get a little confusing when the baby makes some noise in Mr. Pomfritt's class. Maynard finally agrees to let Dobie and Zelda get the police, but they don't. While waiting in the park, Maynard meets Myrtle Tarantino (Jo Anne Worley), who's out with her baby boy. They have a nice conversation about their babies. Myrtle is buying some things at Herbert's store. Dobie and Maynard try to hide Katrina upstairs, but when she makes a noise, they panic. Maynard winds up putting the baby in Myrtle's stroller and gets her back later. Zelda agrees to help Chatsworth pass chemistry if he takes the baby into his house. Maynard shows the baby to Mrs. Osborne and Chatsworth asks her if the baby could stay with them for a while. It turns out that Tomas and Eva were let go as servants by Mrs. Osborne and that's why they had to leave. When Mrs. Osborne, who has taken a liking to the baby, finds out she belongs to Tomas and Eva, she gives them their jobs back. Little Katrina will grow up in the Osborne mansion.
43	4	"Dobie Goes Beatnik"	Guy Scarpitta	Joel Kane	October 25, 1960	4404
Joanne (Susan Silo) asks Charlene what kind of blind date Dobie got for her. When Maynard shows up and says he's her date, Joanne storms off. Dobie comes by and Charlene tells off Dobie. As Dobie bends down to pick up the flowers Charlene threw away, he causes a man to stumble over him. Meanwhile, Herbert has been elected Grand Exalted Bull Bison of his lodge. He's wanted that position since he joined the lodge. But, he needs the approval of the national Grand Exalted Bull Bison, Edward J. McCluskey (Dick Wessel). McCluskey is coming in from Cleveland and will spend some time with the Gillis'. It turns out that McCluskey was the man that Dobie caused to fall, but he didn't know it was Dobie. To impress him, Herbert tells McCluskey that his son mentors a beatnik named Maynard. Herbert learns that it was Dobie that knocked over McCluskey. Herbert comes up with the idea that Dobie and Maynard should switch places. Maynard can only do it for one day, as he has a chance to play bongos for Thelonious Monk. Despite some awkward moments, McCluskey falls for the ruse. A problem arises when McCluskey decides to stay another day. Herbert wants Maynard to play with Thelonious Monk and he's tired of the lies. McCluskey overhears this and tells Herbert he won't get to be Grand Exalted Bull Bison. Dobie finds a way to get McCluskey to change his mind.
44	5	"The Mystic Powers of Maynard G. Krebs"	Rod Amateau	Max Shulman	November 1, 1960	4406
Mr. Pomfritt is discussing ESP with his class and says it's fake. Maynard claims he has it and proves it by correctly telling Mr. Pomfritt what he has in his pants pocket. During lunch, Maynard correctly tells Chatsworth what he has in his lunch basket. Mrs. Clarissa Osborne is so impressed that she wants to put Maynard on her TV station, KASH. Maynard goes on the show "The Hot Seat" which is hosted by Henry R. Starbuck (Dan Frazer). To question Maynard, Henry has brought in psychologists, Dr. Thaddeus Emmons, Dr. Otto von Schwering (John Banner) and Dr. Carlotta Kaggel (Winifred Deforest Coffin). The three all believe that ESP doesn't exist. Despite Maynard revealing things about the Doctors, Thaddeus and Carlotta still believe it's a trick. Henry says he is convinced and believes in "The Mystic Powers of Maynard G. Krebs". After the show, Mrs. Osborne says the phones haven't stopped ringing since Maynard went on the air. She wants Maynard to go on next weeks show to predict the results of the 1960 U.S. Presidential election. Dobie tells Maynard not to reveal the winner on the show because it could taint the election. Maynard likes his new found celebrity and doesn't think what Dobie suggested is fair. Maynard writes down the winner on a piece of paper and gives it to Dobie. Maynard goes on the show and he can sense Dobie telling him not reveal the winner. Maynard tells Henry R. Starbuck he doesn't know the answer. Dobie is proud of Maynard and they go home. After the election, Dobie tells Maynard the name he wrote down on the paper wasn't the winner. Note: This episode was taken out of syndication after John F. Kennedy's assassination, as it concerned the Kennedy-Nixon election of 1960, which this episode aired one week before (Dobie Gillis was pre-empted on November 8 for election return coverage).
45	6	"The Face That Stopped the Clock"	Rod Amateau	Story by : Max Shulman; Teleplay by : Fred S. Fox & Iz Elinson	November 15, 1960	4412
Dobie is working at the grocery store to make enough money to by Herbert a birthday present. Dobie thinks that Maynard needs to give up his fear of work. Herbert looks in the paper and finds a salesman job at an Army, Navy & Civilian Surplus Store and Maynard agrees to go. At the store, Charlie (Joey Faye) is upset with Harry (Alan Carney) for buying a large amount of ugly Confucius statues with clocks in their bellies. Maynard shows up for the job and at first the men aren't interested in him. But when Maynard says he loves the statues, they think he might be able to sell them. After the first day, Maynard feels bad because he couldn't sell one statue. Dobie gives Zelda and Chatsworth the money he was saving. He wants them to disguise themselves and buy some statues from Maynard. They both go to the store and each tells the men they'll only deal with Maynard. Dobie even dresses up and goes to the store. Maynard keeps thinking he recognizes these people. Charlie and Harry are so impressed with Maynard's selling capabilities, they promote him to selling power mowers. Dobie gives Herbert one of the statues for his birthday and Herbert is clearly disappointed. Winnie talks Officer Sam Parmalee (Richard Reeves) into telling Herbert the statue is beautiful. Herbert wants to give the statues to customers as Christmas presents. Herbert calls the Surplus store and orders two dozen of what Maynard is selling, not knowing about the mowers. Word gets out and Herbert's store is full of people wanting the mowers. Marjorie Bennett as Blossom Kenney. Marjorie Stapp as Customer.
46	7	"Maynard G. Krebs - Boy Millionaire"	Rod Amateau	Joel Kane	November 22, 1960	4408
While talking to Dobie, Maynard finds a purse in the park containing $512. Dobie thinks Maynard should turn it in to the police. At first Maynard says no, but Dobie convinces him to turn it in. Maynard gives the money to the Police Sergeant (Jack Albertson) at the station. Maynard is told that the money will be his if no one claims it within six months. Two crooks, Willy Frymass (Joey Faye) and Alfred Montcalm (Milton Frome) are in the jail cell there and hear this. Maynard annoys the Sergeant and Officer Dugan by coming to the station everyday. It's the day before the six months is up and Willy and Alfred are released. Maynard decides to throw a big party for his friends. Knowing that Maynard will be able to pay him back the next day, Herbert fronts him the money for the party. Willy and Alfred are in the park and overhear Maynard's plans. Alfred wants Willy to dress up as an old woman, go to the party and claim the purse was hers. Everyone is having a great time at the party. Willy comes by and tells Dobie and Maynard about losing the purse. Dobie, Maynard and Willy go to the police station and the Sergeant gives Willy the purse. As Willy is kissing Maynard and Dobie thank you, Dobie realizes the old woman needed a shave. Willy is exposed and put in jail. Marianna Hill as Girl in Park. Guests: Homer Garrett's Hollywood Square Dancers
47	8	"Around My Room in 80 Days"	Rod Amateau	Lawrence Williams, Maggie Williams & Max Shulman	November 29, 1960	4407
Outside of school, a couple dropouts make fun of Chatsworth. He teaches them a lesson with his training in Judo. Student Linda Mayhew (Diana Millay) asks fellow student Paul Merrick what's been bothering him. He was an A student, but lately has let his grades slip dramatically. Linda knows Paul is poor, but that shouldn't effect his grades. Paul leaves with the two drop outs. Mr. Pomfritt wants Dobie to convince Paul to stay in school and work to his potential. Dobie asks about Paul's parents and Mr. Pomfritt says he's an orphan. Dobie and Maynard go to where Paul lives. He's not home, but they see his shabby room. Dobie and Maynard talk to Paul and he has a real chip on his shoulder about being poor. Mr. Pomfritt wants the class to write a paper about what they see in their room. Dobie asks Linda's help with Paul, but despite liking him, she thinks he's too far gone. Paul reads his paper in class and describes the beautiful and lavish room he lives in. Dobie and Maynard know he's making it up. Linda asks Paul to go to the dance with her, but he leaves with the drop outs. With Chatsworth's help, Dobie finds a way for Linda and Paul to get together and for her to convince Paul to stay in school.
48	9	"Drag Strip Dobie"	Rod Amateau	Bud Nye & Joel Kane	December 6, 1960	4409
Dobie and Maynard are riding a tandem bicycle in the park and crash into the fountain. They meet cute new girl Charlotte Lamarr. She tells them how crazy she is about speed and anything fast. But then Chatsworth comes by in his sports car and Charlotte falls for him and the car. Dobie decides to build a hot rod to compete with Chatsworth. Zelda suspects Dobie is doing this clearly to impress another girl. But he talks her into helping him. Now Dobie needs to join the Downshifters, a group of hot rod enthusiasts. After speaking with Mr. Sullivan (Alan Dexter), the supervisor of the club, Herbert gives Dobie the money to join. Dobie, Maynard and Zelda get the hot rod built. Charlotte is very interested and Dobie has to make sure Zelda doesn't notice. The two finalists in the original design contest are Dobie and Chatsworth. Zelda overhears Dobie sweet talking Charlotte and gets mad. She takes the motor out of their car. With a little deception from Maynard, Dobie still wins. After spending time with Dobie, Charlotte decides she's into speed boats and goes off with Chatsworth.
49	10	"Jangle Bells"	Rod Amateau	Lawrence Williams, Maggie Williams & Joel Kane	December 20, 1960	4413
The students are performing part of "A Christmas Carol" in Mr. Pomfritt's class. Mr. Pomfritt convinces Maynard he needn't be a social outcast. He can be one of the gang by throwing a Christmas Eve party. Meanwhile, Chatsworth tells Dobie about the posh Christmas Eve party he'll be throwing. Zelda tells Dobie that to move up the social ladder, he must go to Chatsworth's party. Maynard mentions to Dobie and Zelda about his party. Dobie has to decide between moving up in the world or his friend Maynard. Dobie asks Herbert what he should do, but Herbert is no help. Dobie has a dream about being visited by the Ghost of Christmas Past. The ghost looks like Maynard. Dobie sees back when he and Maynard were little children. Then the Ghost of Christmas Future shows Dobie his wealthy future with Zelda. Dobie sends away a poor Maynard. Dobie wakes up. Dobie feels uneasy at Chatsworth's party and Maynard is all alone as no one came to his party except for an little orange tabby cat (Orangey). Dobie, Zelda, Herbert and Winnie show up at Maynard's place. Soon after, everyone from Chatsworth's party shows up. Note: Dwayne Hickman sings "I Pass Your House" from his Dobie! album.
50	11	"Parlez-Vous English?"	Guy Scarpitta	Max Shulman	December 27, 1960	4414
Winifred would like Dobie to be introduced to more culture. Winnie wants to take Dobie to a touring art exhibit by Aristede Le Blanc (Marcel Hillaire) at the museum. Dobie doesn't want to go and leaves with Maynard. At the museum, Winnie meets Aristede. Winnie learns that Aristede has a daughter named Yvette (Danielle De Metz), who is Dobie's age. Winnie would like Dobie to meet a girl of culture so she invites Aristede's family over for dinner. The family arrive at the Gillis home. What Winnie doesn't know is that Yvette is into older men that will order her around. At Winnie's suggestion, Yvette reluctantly agrees to go for a walk with Dobie after dinner. During their walk, Dobie and Yvette barely speak and they clearly are not having a good time. When they get back, Dobie is surprised when Yvette asks if she may come back the next day. Dobie tells Maynard that Yvette has come by every day for two weeks. One day Yvette comes to the grocery store and after telling Herbert how much she wants him, she chases him around the store. Winnie, Dobie and Maynard arrive and Yvette tells Winnie that she loves Herbert. Aristede arrives and drags Yvette away. Note: Based on one of Shulman's original short stories from I was a Teenage Dwarf.
51	12	"The Day the Teachers Disappeared"	Rod Amateau	Story by : Rod Amateau; Teleplay by : Dean Riesner	January 3, 1961	4411
Dobie and Maynard ask Mr. Pomfritt why he's quitting teaching. Despite liking teaching, it does not pay enough to support his family. Dobie mentions that the teachers are meeting with the School Board to discuss a pay raise. Pomfritt says the Board hasn't approved a raise in a very, very long time. Apparently Pomfritt's new job is selling ice cream bars. That night Mr. Pomfritt tells the Board that the meeting will have to be postponed as all the other teachers have come down with the flu. Promfritt says that the school be closed until the teachers are well again. Winnie suggests that the parents take over the classes. Herbert is for the idea just to prove how soft the teachers have it. Herbert is assigned the English class and Chatsworth sets him straight on what they're learning. Blossom Kenney has the music class and the students complain about her playing old fashioned music. Winnie has the girl's gym class and she has her own style of exercise. Mr. Pomfritt then catches Herbert having his class play baseball instead of studying English. Clarissa Osborne is teaching Home Economics and she teaches the class about how to handle the servant staff. At the next Board meeting the parents vote to give the teachers a bigger raise than they requested. Note: Dwayne Hickman sings "Don't Send a Rabbit" from his Dobie! album.
52	13	"What's My Lion?"	Robert Gordon	Story by : Rod Amateau; Teleplay by : Dean Riesner	January 10, 1961	4410
Prince Dumiphon of Imbodia has gifted a sacred lion to the United States and it is put in the local zoo. But without anyone seeing, it escapes. Maynard finds the lion in the park. The lion follows Maynard to school and everyone runs out of the building. Maynard becomes a hero for capturing the lion and is to receive a reward. Dobie and Maynard are met at the hotel by Mr. Hargrove (James Millhollin) and Mr. Huggins (George Ives) from the US government. Grand Wazir Abdul Ali Hakim (Henry Corden), Prince Dumiphon's Prime Minister, is to make the presentation. The Prince is in the country to sign an oil treaty with the Government and the loss of the lion threatened that. Maynard visits the lion in the zoo and feels sorry for it. Maynard steals the lion and has it in the Gillis grocery truck. Maynard has to find a place to hide the lion until he can return it to the Prince. He takes it to a coffee house where The Imp is playing bongos. Riff Ryan (Tommy Farrell) shows Maynard a newspaper that says the lion thief is being sought. Maynard then brings the lion to the Gillis grocery store where it frightens Herbert. Maynard finally gets to meet Prince Dumiphon and he turns out to be The Imp. The Prince promises Maynard that the lion will be returned to Imbodia and set free. The oil treaty is signed and everyone is happy.
53	14	"The Big Question"	Rod Amateau	Max Shulman & Joel Kane	January 24, 1961	4417
About to graduate from high school, Dobie, Maynard and the rest of the class must write an essay for Mr. Pomfritt on the question "whither are we drifting?". That is, what they plan to do with their lives as adults and what they see happening in their future. Dobie and Maynard are walking through town trying to think of something to write. Officer Dugan gives them a citation because Maynard was dropping peanut shells all over. Dobie and Maynard discuss growing up to no end. Maynard just wants to listen to jazz the rest of his life, but Dobie says he'll outgrow that desire. Dobie thinks that their parents coddled them too much and now they don't know how to be adults. Dobie and Maynard talk with Mr. Pomfritt and he mentions thinking about jobs and if they applied themselves, maybe college. Maynard suggests going into politics, but then realizes there are too many decisions to make. The papers are to be turned in the next day and the boys still haven't written anything. At school, Maynard starts to read his paper and talks about his dog which chewed up the other pages. Dobie hasn't written a paper and explains that he just doesn't know what the future holds for him. Dobie comes up with an analogy between him and baby birds being kicked out of the nest and making it on their own. Mr. Pomfritt gives Dobie an A and tells the class how proud he is of them. All the students ask Mr. Pomfritt if they could buy him a drink at the malt shop.
54	15	"Have You Stopped Beating Your Wife?"	Robert Gordon	Story by : Rod Amateau; Teleplay by : Ray Allen	January 31, 1961	4415
Dobie has been studying a book about the problems of married life. Dobie is concerned that Herbert spends almost every night with the boys at the Bison Lodge. Winnie is left home alone. Dobie believes his parents are incompatible. Herbert tells his family that he is once again in the running to become Grand Exalted Big Bull Bison. Winnie complains to Herbert that she is feeling neglected. Dobie gives Herbert a test out of the book and he doesn't do well. Winnie is getting a travel bag for her friend Blanche who is going to the beach. Herbert sees Winnie with the bag and, thinking that she's leaving, promises to be a better husband. Dobie gives Herbert some suggestions out of the book. Herbert gives Winnie some candy and flowers and sings to her. Winnie's bridge club ladies see this and wonder what Herbert did that he's trying to make up for. Winnie explains that Herbert's been spending more time with her and has even stopped going to the Bison Lodge. The ladies are now all very envious of Winnie. Winnie tells Herbert that he should go to the Lodge. When he does, all the other members want to kick him out because their wives want them to act more like Herbert. The wives come by and demand that their husband's vote Herbert the Grand Exalted Big Bull Bison. Jack Albertson as Zabinski. Milton Frome as Mr. Kenney. Alan Carney as Bison Lodge Member. Winnie Collins as Bridge Player. Arlene Harris as Mrs. Lapping.
55	16	"The Bitter Feud of Dobie and Maynard"	Stanley Z. Cherry	Story by : Rod Amateau; Teleplay by : Joel Kane	February 7, 1961	4418
Dobie starts to realize that Maynard is preventing him from enjoying many opportunities in life. But he doesn't want to give up their friendship. Maynard overhears Zelda telling Dobie that he is holding Dobie back from advancing in life. Maynard then overhears Chatsworth tell Dobie that he won't be able to join the golf and tennis club because of Maynard. Maynard then fantasizes that he and Dobie are crossing a desert. Dobie winds up dying because he wouldn't leave Maynard behind. After talking to Herbert, Maynard decides Dobie should drop him as a friend. Dobie wants to remain friends. Maynard starts to be insulting to Dobie and ignores him. Dobie finally takes advantage of some of those missed opportunities. Zelda sees Maynard talking to himself about how sad he is without Dobie. Now all of Dobie's friends are mad at him for dumping Maynard. Even Mr. Promfritt is mad at Dobie. Dobie goes and befriends Maynard again.
56	17	"Zelda, Get Off My Back"	Rod Amateau	Story by : Max Shulman; Teleplay by : Lawrence & Maggie Williams	February 14, 1961	4416
Dobie is trying to make time with Jessica Zeffelhorse, but Zelda comes by and ruins things. While Zelda is a nice, kind person, Dobie needs to find a way to get her off his back. Dobie tries to tell Zelda that he made a date with Monica Klaus, but she just keeps talking about the two of them getting together. Meanwhile, Chatsworth is getting poor grades and may not get into Yale. Chatsworth starts to woo the brainy Zelda to help him with his studies. Dobie encourages Zelda to go and be wined and dined by Chatsworth. Dobie is now free to date other girls. But he finds that Jessica doesn't want to do any of the things that he likes to do. Dobie finds that Monica is very conceited. Dobie learns that he's not happy being free. Chatsworth is doing much better in school thanks to Zelda. Zelda comes by the grocery store, but neither her nor Dobie can bring themselves to say they miss each other. Dobie finally tells Zelda he wants her back and she is happy to hear it.
57	18	"I Was a High School Scrooge"	Rod Amateau	Max Shulman	February 21, 1961	4420
Zelda is Central High's yearbook editor. She wants Dobie and Maynard to write a "where are they now" feature. Zelda picks the school's former star football player and 1911 graduate Walter "show 'em no mercy" Appleby (Douglass Dumbrille). They don't know it, but Appleby is now a rich industrialist who just bought the Kane Iron & Steel Company. Dobie and Maynard run into Appleby while he's inspecting the waste dump of the company. They believe he is poor and destitute. When they tell Zelda what they saw, they decide to campaign for the senior class to raise money to help him out. The students efforts makes it into the local paper. Appleby sees the article and is furious. He wants his lawyer Mr. Withers (James Millhollin) to sue Dobie's parents. Appleby and Withers come by the grocery store and Winnie offers Appleby some food. Appleby tells Winnie how wealthy he is and that he is going to sue for defamation of character. Appleby and Withers go to the school to hear Dobie make a fundraising speech. Appleby is actually moved by Dobie's kind words. He introduces himself to the students and tells them he's not poor. He gives the students some money to buy things for the school. Later, Dobie tells Appleby that with the money, they will build a new auditorium for the school and name it after him.
58	19	"Will Success Spoil Dobie's Mother?"	Rod Amateau	Story by : Max Shulman; Teleplay by : Ray Allen	February 28, 1961	4419
Winnie has been entering a lot of contests lately and it's driving Herbert crazy. Herbert bets Winnie that if she ever wins a contest, he'll let her mother and sister come to visit for six months. Meanwhile, Dobie is interested in Jessica Tichborn who had been going out with school athlete Fast Freight McCurdy (Norm Grabowski). But Jessica is tired of Fast Freight and his muscles and wants someone like Dobie now. Zelda tries to talk Jessica out of wanting Dobie. Dobie gets a letter saying he won a magazine contest and first prize is a date with glamorous movie starlet Merilee Maribou (Joyce Jameson). Apparently, Winnie entered the contest using Dobie's name. Winnie now wants her Mother and sister to come visit. Trying to get out of it, Herbert says he'll say Dobie didn't write the entry to the contest and he will be disqualified. When Jessica finds out about Dobie winning the date with Merilee, she no longer wants to see him. Dobie would rather be with Jessica and is willing to give up the date with Merilee. But Zelda thinks going out with Merilee would be a stepping stone to stardom. It turns out the date with Merilee is really just an 8 minute photo and publicity session. Mother (Esther Dale) and sister Gladys arrive for their visit. Note: Dwayne Hickman, Sheila James, and Bob Denver sing "Don't Shoot the Man in the Moon" from Hickman's Dobie! album.
59	20	"The Second Childhood of Herbert T. Gillis"	Robert Gordon	Joel Kane	March 7, 1961	4421
It's almost graduation day for Dobie. Dobie tells his parents the school's yearbook committee wants to publish the parents' old high school graduation photos with their child's. Herbert admits to Winnie that he never graduated high school. She talks Herbert into going to night school. Herbert goes to his history class and meets his teacher Monty W. Milfloss (Marvin Kaplan). He learns that Milfloss also teaches Dobie's history class. So Dobie doesn't find out what Herbert is doing, he gives Milfloss a different name. Herbert pretends to help Dobie study, but he is actually using Dobie as a tutor. Milfloss notices that Herbert's last report is exactly like Dobie's and knows that someone is a plagiarist. Herbert confesses to Milfloss and then Dobie about what he did. Milfloss will give Herbert another chance to write his own assignments. Herbert passes his final exam and is able to graduate with Dobie. Robert Foulk as Mr. Callahan.
60	21	"Dobie vs. the Machine"	Rod Amateau	Malvin Wald & Max Shulman	March 14, 1961	4423
Recent graduates Dobie and Maynard have no idea what to do with their lives. Dobie asks Herbert's advice, but Herbert really has no answers. Herbert does suggest going in the grocery business with him, but Dobie doesn't think it's for him. Maynard takes Dobie and Herbert to talk to Riff Ryan. Herbert talks the boys out of taking Riff's suggestion of just sitting around thinking profound thoughts. They then seek Mr. Pomfritt's advice. He suggests they have a psychometric test done to see what their aptitude, actual skills and desires are. The boys go to see Dr. Magruder (Robert Burton) and Dr. Campbell. They run through several different tests. After a week, Dobie and Herbert go for the results. Maynard's aren't ready yet. Dr. Magruder says the results are coded and will be placed into a computer. Dobie doesn't want a machine to tell him what to do. Because Herbert enlisted in the Army after high school, Dobie thinks that's what he'll do. Herbert hopes that Dobie will make new friends in the Army, but then he learns Maynard enlisted as well.
61	22	"Baby Shoes"	Robert Gordon	Lawrence Williams, Maggie Williams & Max Shulman	March 21, 1961	4422
Dobie receives a letter saying his enlistment in the United States Army has been processed. Herbert starts getting sentimental with Dobie. But he also wants to toughen Dobie up. Herbert gets Maynard involved as well. Herbert wants Dobie to clear all the junk out of his room. They find Dobie's baby shoes and Herbert wants to have them bronzed. Herbert reminisces back to the 1940s when he is in the Army and the Gillis' were eagerly expecting their baby. Back to the present, Zelda reminds Dobie that she'll be waiting for him. It's the day that Dobie's to leave and the Gillis' and Zelda try to put on a brave face. Dobie is sad that it doesn't seem that they care that he's going. But after he's gone, they all break down and cry. They don't know it, but Dobie came back and sees them crying and he feels better.
62	23	"I Didn't Raise My Boy to Be a Soldier, Sailor or Marine"	Rod Amateau	Joel Kane	March 28, 1961	4424
Dobie, Maynard and several other men are about to board the bus to the army induction center. Gruff Sgt. Floyd W. Ronk is giving them instructions and tells them it will be some time before the bus takes off. Herbert, Zelda and Chatsworth are there to see them off. Maynard forgot to do something at home and leaves. Not wanting Maynard to get court martialed for desertion, Dobie ropes Chatsworth into substituting for him. On the bus, Chatsworth tries to tell Sgt. Ronk he's not Maynard, but Ronk thinks he's just bucking for a Section 8. Meanwhile, Maynard comes back and Herbert will drive him to the induction center. Chatsworth and Dobie get their uniforms and shots. Dobie and then Chatsworth have a placement interview with Cpl. Grover P. Wister (John Fiedler). Chatsworth starts to impress Wister with his knowledge of foreign languages and Morse code. Chatsworth then lectures and impresses Dr. Worthington (Frank Wilcox). Maynard finally shows up and he and Chatsworth switch clothes. Dobie somehow convinces Ronk that Maynard is really the person that's been at camp the whole time.
63	24	"The Chicken Corporal"	Rod Amateau	Arnold Horwitt	April 4, 1961	4425
Dobie tells Private T.J. Strauss (Jack Mullaney) that there's one thing missing in the Army and that's girls. Dobie would like to have a date with pretty Betsy (Diane Jergens), the waitress at the mess hall. Betsy initially turns Dobie down. But then she agrees if Dobie can get a date for her roommate Suzy. The problem is that while she's a very nice person, Suzy isn't very attractive. Maynard sees a picture of Suzy and actually wants to go out with her. But in order to get leave for Saturday night there are a couple of tests one needs to pass. Maynard is at the bottom of the class. The first test is marksmanship and Lt. Merriweather (Burt Metcalfe) is in charge. Dobie is Maynard's score keeper and was going to falsify how well Maynard did. But after a speech from Merriweather, Dobie can't do it and gives Maynard the bad marks he deserves. Both Maynard and Betsy are mad at Dobie. Maynard might still get leave if his passes bunk inspection, but his bunk is a mess. Because Dobie is doing so well, Merriweather is making him acting Corporal of his squad. He is to do the barrack bunk inspections. Dobie intends to pass Maynard, but then decides it won't be right. Merriweather knows Maynard is Dobie's friend and is proud of Dobie for not passing him. Merriweather gives Maynard another chance and passes him. Maynard gets his leave and is able to go out with Suzy. Dobie, however, is put on guard duty and can't go out with Betsy. Betsy goes out with T.J. Strauss.
64	25	"The Solid Gold Dog-Tag"	Guy Scarpitta	Dean Riesner	April 11, 1961	4427
Some girls are fawning over Chatsworth and his new car. But then Dobie, who is on leave, comes by in his uniform and all the girls rush over to see him. They tell him how handsome he is in his uniform. Tired of being pampered and coddled all his life, Chatsworth decides to become a man by enlisting in the Army. Mrs. Osborne doesn't believe her son can survive without her. Chatsworth is assigned to Dobie and Maynard's platoon and they are at first not happy about it. But then they decide to try and help him fit in and be a regular guy. Things don't go well because of Chatsworth's superior knowledge and skills. Dobie worries that the other guys will start to resent him. Slowly Chatsworth starts to be one of the guys. But then one day Mrs. Osborne shows up and puts a fancy bed for Chatsworth in the barracks. Col. Roy J. Stonehenge (Robert Burton) comes in and wants to know what Mrs. Osborne is doing there. Mrs. Osborne causes some problems and the other guys are now mad at Chatsworth. The next day, everyone likes Chatsworth. It turns out that Mrs. Osborne is donating a giant recreation center to the camp. Chatsworth puts a stop to the recreation center because he doesn't want to be liked for that. Judy Nugent as Blonde. Roy Jenson as Sergeant Trotti.
65	26	"The Battle of Maynard's Beard"	Rod Amateau	Dean Riesner	April 18, 1961	4429
Maynard is ordered to shave off his beard when he gets it caught in his rifle's bolt release. Maynard would rather desert than shave his beard. Dobie is infatuated with their soldier's rights teacher, Lt. Portia Potter (Kaye Elhardt). But he knows nothing can come of it as she is an Officer and he is an enlisted man. Dobie contemplates signing up for Officer's Candidate School so he could date Portia. Dobie believes he can defend Maynard in a court martial. When Dobie tells Sgt. Wyncoup (Richard Bakalyan) that Maynard refuses to shave his beard, Maynard is thrown in the stockade. The Colonel (Bartlett Robinson) is willing to drop all charges if Maynard shaves the beard. Maynard agrees but Dobie refuses to let him do it. Portia learns that Dobie is doing all this in hopes off becoming an officer and dating her. But he says it's also a matter of principal. Dobie gets some advice from his father. The military tribunal has begun and Herbert is there to watch Dobie defend Maynard. Dobie tries to prove that Maynard getting his beard stuck in his rifle was a one time thing. But then Maynard does it again. The Judges on the tribunal are ready to convict Maynard. But then a Colonel from the Judge Advocate General's office arrives and he has a large beard. The Judges then give a verdict of not guilty.
66	27	"Spaceville"	Rod Amateau	Arnold Horwitt	April 25, 1961	4428
Col. Stonehenge informs the General (Willis Bouchey) that the technical problems of Operation Moonshot have been resolved. Dr. Halsey says that they need to find below average men to test the human aspect of the project. If those men can succeed, then anyone can. Dr. Halsey picks Maynard for the experiment which requires him to spend 30 days in a simulated space capsule. Maynard will be teamed with Corporal Kilroy who happens to be a chimpanzee. Dr. Halsey decides Dobie should join them. Maynard and Kilroy figure a way to get out of the capsule. Despite wanting real food, Maynard at first decides not to leave. But then he and Kilroy leave the casule. Dobie wakes up and finds the two eating chicken. Even though he knows he should tell the General, Dobie says he won't. It's the 15th day and time for an examination. Dr. Halsey is surprised Maynard and Kilroy have gained weight. The boys are put back in the capsule, but Kilroy is ready to be sent to the moon. Maynard misses Kilroy and finds him in the other capsule. Maynard is locked in the capsule and it's placed on the rocket. Dobie tries to stop the launch, but the rocket takes off. The caspsule eventually winds up on a tropical island with beautiful girls pampering Maynard. He thinks he's on the moon. Bea Benaderet as Telephone Operator (voice).
67	28	"Like Mother, Like Daughter, Like Wow"	Rod Amateau	Ray Allen	May 2, 1961	4430
At the Servicemen's Recreation Center Dobie is dancing with Hazel Grimes (Yvonne Craig). Dobie is very interested in Hazel, but Hazel is just there as a volunteer dancer and turns down his advances. When Hazel finds out he's Dobie Gillis, she gives him a big kiss. Hazel explains that her mother, Helen "Bubbles" Grimes (Jane Dulo) used to live here in town. They recently moved back. Bubbles and Dobie's father used to go out together until she had to move. Hazel now wants to spend time with Dobie. Army MP Quentin (Hugh Sanders) brings Dobie home for violating curfew. Winnie gets upset when Dobie mentions Bubbles, whose last name was Corrigan back then, because she remembers Herbert went out with her. Herbert tells Winnie that Bubbles means nothing to him anymore. Maynard thinks Hazel is after Dobie for his military salary. Hazel mentions marriage to Dobie and they go looking at furniture. Hazel meets Herbert and Winnie and Winnie gets jealous again at the mention of Bubbles. Bubbles arrives at the grocery store and meets Winnie. Bubbles then fawns all over Herbert, much to Winnie's annoyance. Herbert invites Bubbles to stay for dinner and Winnie starts to cry. Winnie and Bubbles do wind up being friends when Bubbles tells her how lucky she is to have Herbert. Winnie wants to find Bubbles a man. MP Quentin comes by again with Dobie. Winnie introduces Quentin to Bubbles and they start going together.
68	29	"Dobie Plays Cupid"	Rod Amateau	Joel Kane	May 9, 1961	4431
Home from the Army on furlough, Dobie and Maynard go to a party at the Serviceman's Recreation Center. Maynard is terrified of all the girls there. To help him out, Dobie tries to introduce Maynard to Angela Crittenden, but Maynard hides up in a tree. Even Clarissa Osborne, who set up the center, wants Maynard to meet some girls. But Maynard just freezes up when he's by a girl. At the grocery store, Winnie tries to encourage Maynard. Jenny (Trudi Ziskind) comes by, tries to talk to Maynard and he runs off. To build up Maynard's confidence, Herbert suggests that they pay a girl to go out with him. Dobie sweet talks Angela into helping with Maynard. Herbert bribes Jenny into helping. In the park, Angela flirts with Maynard, tells him how much she loves when he twitches his eyebrows and gives him her phone number. Jenny chases Maynard around the grocery store and he twitches his eyebrows. Maynard starts to gain his confidence. Dobie now has to see if Maynard can be with girls that haven't been coached. The two go to another party at the Recreation Center. Over confident Maynard starts going after all the girls. But then Maynard tells Dobie he knew all along that Angela and Jenny were a set up. Maynard says that he just has to be himself and if girls don't like that, it's OK. Angela tells Maynard that she respects his individuality and gives him a kiss. Mrs. Osborne likes that Maynard stands up for his principals.
69	30	"Like Father, Like Son, Like Trouble"	Stanley Z. Cherry	Bud Nye	May 16, 1961	4432
Lt. Merriwether (Richard Clair) has written a play about being a soldier in Korea. Dobie and Maynard land the lead roles playing officers. They tell Herbert they aren't right for the parts. Herbert tells Dobie he comes from a long line of amateur actors. There have been a few rehearsals and Merriwether is happy with Dobie's progress. Dobie sees and tries to woo Dorrit McCurdy. She has her back to him and is definitely not interested. Dress rehearsal goes very well. Still dressed as his character Major Gates, Dobie runs into Dorrit again. When Dorrit sees the uniform, she is impressed and is willing to spend some time with Dobie. They go to her house and Dobie, while calling himself Major Gates, tells Dorrit war stories he was in. Dobie meets Dorrit's father, Col. McCurdy (Howard Petrie). He happens to be the base's gruff new colonel. McCurdy would like Dobie to be the speaker at the next days graduation ceremony. Dobie has to figure how to get out of it or be caught impersonating an officer. Dobie tells Herbert what he did. Herbert knows McCurdy and finds a way to get Dobie out of giving the speech. After the play, McCurdy tells Dobie that he remembers his father as Herbie "Snow Job" Gillis. McCurdy is not angry and Dobie doesn't get into any real trouble.
70	31	"Be It Ever So Humble"	Rod Amateau	Arnold Horwitt	May 23, 1961	4433
Some of the men are watching a sentimental war movie on TV. Maynard is stricken with acute homesickness. Maynard asks Lt. Merriwether for a three day pass but is turned down. Dobie calls Herbert and asks him to bring some of Maynards belongings from home to maybe make him feel better. Herbert is getting an insurance policy and agent Mr. Daly says he will have to take a physical. Herbert brings Maynard many items from his room, but it only makes Maynard even more homesick. Maynard does several unasked for favors for Merriwether and he finally gets his pass. When Dobie finds Maynard gone, he thinks Maynard went AWOL. Dobie tries to fill in for Maynard so he isn't noticed missing. Dobie wants to go back home to get Maynard. He gets his own pass from Merriwether by claiming that his father is deathly ill. Merriwether calls Mr. Mimms (Jonathan Hole) from the Red Cross and asks him to look in on Herbert. Dr. Caul (Norman Fell) comes to give Herbert his physical. Dobie arrives and Maynard tries to tell him that he has a pass. Mr. Mimms comes by and tells Dobie he's there to verify Herbert's illness. Herbert passes his physical and Dr. Caul leaves the room briefly. Dobie tells Herbert he has to pretend to be sick for Mr. Mims. Dr. Caul comes back and there is now confusion between Mims and Caul as to Herbert's condition. Merriwether isn't to hard on Dobie and Maynard. Paul Bryar as Sergeant in Movie.
71	32	"Ah! Yer Fadder Wears Army Shoes"	Rod Amateau	Bill Gammie & Max Shulman	May 30, 1961	4435
Dobie meets Lt. Merriwether's pretty secretary, Private Marcia Turner, and immediately makes advances towards her. She is very much a WAC and wants nothing to do with Dobie. Marcia tells about her long family history of military service. Dobie then exaggerates about his father's military history and the amount of medals he's received. Marcia now looks forward to meeting Herbert at the Father and Son Day at the camp. Merriwether tells Dobie he expects everyone's father to show up on Saturday. Not wanting to be caught in a lie, Dobie leads him to believe that Herbert was "missing in action". Marcia nows cares for Dobie. Winnie hears about the Father and Son Day and wonders why Dobie hasn't mentioned it. Herbert figures Dobie just doesn't want him around. Winnie doesn't believe Dobie would be like that and Herbert decides to go and surprise Dobie. It's Saturday and Merriwether tells everyone about Dobie's father and his sacrifice. Dobie can't help himself and gives a speech about Herbert's extraordinary exploits. Dobie tells how Herbert escaped from a Japanese prison camp with his buddy Brooklyn (Herb Ellis). He recounts how Herbert blew up the Bridge on the River Kwai. Herbert shows up and hearing Dobie's stories, he pretends he was found and is now back. Herbert plays along and tells some more stories.
72	33	"Everything But the Truth"	Stanley Z. Cherry	Joel Kane	June 6, 1961	4434
Dobie is surprised when he gets a nasty letter from Zelda. Despite how upset she is with Dobie's lack of interest, Zelda tells Jenny she'd take him back. Snooty Rochelle Kincheloe comes by and invites Zelda to a big society party. Rochelle gives Zelda a hard time because she doesn't think Zelda can get a date. Zelda lies and tells her she and Dobie are secretly engaged and he'll take her. Zelda knows Dobie has too many demerits to get a pass and she'll use this to her advantage. Meanwhile, the Sergeant made a mistake and Dobie is on the list to get a pass. Zelda tells Rochelle about Dobie not getting a pass. Jenny calls Zelda, while Rochelle is there, pretending to be Dobie calling from camp. Rochelle tells Herbert and Winnie that Dobie is engaged and they say he isn't. Herbert says that when Dobie sees Zelda, he runs. Rochelle tells them Dobie is invited to the party. Dobie doesn't know Rochelle, but he'll go. At the party, Rochelle tells everyone about Zelda's boyfriend Dobie. Just then, Dobie and Maynard walk in and Zelda is embarrassed. Feeling bad for Zelda, Dobie plays along and says they're engaged.
73	34	"Goodbye, Mr. Pomfritt - Hello, Mr. Chips"	Guy Scarpitta	Joel Kane	June 13, 1961	4436
Dobie and Maynard are visiting their old school, Central High. Mr. Pomfritt enters the classroom and announces that at the end of the week he will be leaving the teaching profession. Despite the fact that he enjoys teaching, he doesn't make enough money to support his family. Dobie tells his parents about Pomfritt and how he will be missed. Dobie flashes back to when Maynard brought a bunch of frogs into the classroom. Principal Nettleton wants Dobie and Maynard to bring their parents to school. Pomfritt sticks up for the boys and gets them out of trouble. Back to the present and Dobie wants to bring successful alumni back to the school for a testimonial party in honor of Mr. Pomfritt. Dobie gets a list of people, writes out the invitations and has Maynard mail them. It's the night of the party and no one is there yet. Dobie finds out from Monty Ferguson the mailman that Maynard put the letters in a mail storage box where they've been for three days. Monty and Floyd Trigby the janitor went to Central high. Clyde (Eddie Firestone) and Myrtle Tarantino (Jo Anne Worley) heard about the party from Herbert and come by. They went to school there and want Promfritt to stay. Promfritt comes by. It may not be the successful people that Dobie wanted, but each of these people relate how much Promfritt changed their lives. Mr. Pomfritt decides to stay a teacher. Julie Payne as Mary Lou. June Palmer as Lola.
74	35	"Take Me to Your Leader"	Rod Amateau	Lawrence Williams, Maggie Williams & Max Shulman	June 20, 1961	4403
It's a stormy night and Dobie and Maynard are on guard duty. They hear a strange noise and call for Sgt. Wyncoup (Richard Bakalyan). It turns out to be a lizard. They tell Wyncoup why they're so jumpy. It was a similar stormy night and Dobie, Maynard and Zelda were watching the grocery store. Herbert and Winnie went to go see the movie "The Monster that Devoured Cleveland". Zelda says that if aliens were to invade Earth, they would look exactly like humans to blend in. A Jane Smith comes into the store wanting to use the phone. The three become suspicious. They overhear Jane say that this town was a perfect place to land. Maynard goes to get the police. What they don't know is that Jane is preparing for the arrival of a film crew. At the police station, Chief Rosenbloom (Herb Vigran) is trying to find out where a Little Boy (Ronnie Howard) lives. They give him a space helmet and a plastic ray gun to play with just as Maynard walks in. Maynard thinks he's an alien and leaves. He tells Dobie what he saw. Maynard then locks Jane in the freezer. Herbert and Winnie come back acting like the monster in the movie. Maynard locks them and Zelda in the freezer. Some of the film crew show up and they are put in the freezer. The police and Nicholby the Producer (Alan Carney) arrive and wind up in the freezer. Everyone is finally released and Dobie and Maynard are put in the freezer. Peter Brocco as Cedric Van Horn. Neil Nephew as Alabama Schwarz. Note: The army framing scenes were added because the episode had been shot earlier in the production schedule, before Dobie's and Maynard's enlistments.
75	36	"This Ain't the Way We Used to Do It"	Stanley Z. Cherry	Bud Nye	June 27, 1961	4426
Dobie and Maynard are one week away from graduating basic training. Lt. Spunky Meriwether (Jack Grinnage) says that if they perform well in their finals, there will be passes for everyone. Spunky would like all the parents to be there. After Herbert gets Dobie's letter with the invitation, he looks forward to seeing how the Army has made Dobie into a strong, confident man. Meriwether tells Master Sgt. Clum (Nesdon Booth) that his squad has been chosen to perform the best maneuver, Operation Xerxes. It's a secret special training mission and Dobie and Maynard are worried. Herbert and Winnie arrive at camp and Dobie introduces them to Meriwether. Meriwether is told that Herbert was a sergeant during WWII. Herbert doesn't think much of Meriwether as a commander and the place seems more like a country club than a boot camp. Herbert thinks the men are spoiled and pampered. Herbert wants to get the men in shape for their secret maneuver. The next morning Herbert runs the men through some rigorous exercises. When Maynard suffers a head injury, Herbert decides to fill in for him during the maneuver. The men a loaded onto an airplane. Herbert then learns he'll have to jump out of the plane. Suddenly, Herbert's not as tough as he made out to be.
