= Lane Caudell =

American actor and singer-songwriter

- Born: April 25, 1952 (age 74); Asheboro, North Carolina, U.S.
- Education: Asheboro High School
- Occupations: Actor; singer-songwriter; music publisher
- Years active: 1972–present
- Spouse: Mo Lauren
- Children: Lane Toran

Lane Caudell (born April 25, 1952) is an American actor and singer-songwriter who appeared in the films Goodbye, Franklin High, and Hanging on a Star and played Woody King on the NBC daytime soap opera Days of Our Lives (1982–1983). In addition to working as a solo artist, Caudell's musical endeavors included recording and touring with the Player precursor, Skyband.

Caudell works as a music publisher for Cauley Music Group in Nashville, Tennessee. He is the father of actor-musician Lane Toran.

== Filmography ==
=== Film and television ===
Caudell had roles several minor films for the teenage market in the 1970s, including the lead role in the musical film Hanging on a Star, in which "a big rubbery Lane Caudell arises on a swampy stage and sings in a bubblingly oily voice." Caudell had the starring role in The Archer, a fantasy with swords and sorcerers. Caudell's character, Toran of the Hawk Clan, has been framed for the murder of his father, Chief Brakus.

Hal Erickson praised his performance in Goodbye, Franklin High.

In her 1987 memoir I'm with the Band: Confessions of a Groupie, Pamela Des Barres describes Caudell as having given up show business, "after playing a caveman in a TV movie and a brief stint on Days of Our Lives."

Year	Title	Role	Notes
1977	Satan's Cheerleaders	Stevie	Feature film
1978	Goodbye, Franklin High	Will Armer	Feature film
1978	Hanging on a Star	Jeff Martin	Feature film
1979	Good Ol' Boys	Cooter	TV pilot episode
1980	Battles: The Murder That Wouldn't Die	Joe "Deacon" Johnson	TV film
1981	The Archer: Fugitive from the Empire	Toran of Malveel	TV film
1982–1983	Days of Our Lives	Woody King	Daytime serial

=== Soundtrack ===
Year	Title	Song performed
1976	Sasquatch, the Legend of Bigfoot	"High in the Mountains"
1978	Buffalo Rider	"The Life and Legend of Buffalo Jones"
1993	Fire in the Sky	"Guest of Honor"

== Discography ==
=== Albums ===
Year	Title	Label
1978	Hanging on a Star	MCA Records
1979	Midnight Hunter	MCA Records

=== Singles ===
Year	Title	Label
1972	"Let Our Love Ride"	Capitol Records
1973	"Should I Care"	Metromedia Records
1973	"Play On, Play On"	Capitol Records
1974	"Alabama Boy"	Private Stock Records
1978	"Those Eyes"	MCA Records
1978	"Hanging on a Star"	MCA Records
1979	"Love, Hit and Run"	MCA Records
