= Goodbye, Franklin High =

- Directed by: Mike MacFarland
- Written by: Stu Krieger
- Produced by: Mike MacFarland
- Starring: Lane Caudell; Julie Adams; Darby Hinton; Ann Dusenberry; William Windom
- Cinematography: Dean Cundey
- Edited by: Peter Parasheles
- Music by: Lane Caudell
- Production company: Cal-Am Productions
- Distributed by: Cal-Am Artists
- Release date: April 1978
- Running time: 94 minutes
- Country: United States
- Language: English

Goodbye, Franklin High is a 1978 American film starring Lane Caudell, Julie Adams, Darby Hinton, Ann Dusenberry, and William Windom. The film's tagline is: It seems like it's taken forever – but at last we're on our own!

== Plot ==
Will Armer (Caudell) is a high-school athlete, who during his senior year, must deal with his girlfriend (Dusenberry) and parents (Adams and Windom) and make a difficult decision between the certainty of college or the possibility of a glamorous baseball career. Everyone associated with Will has a different opinion, making the final decision all the more dramatic.

== Cast ==
- Lane Caudell as Will Armer
- Julie Adams as Janice Armer
- William Windom as Clifford Armer
- Darby Hinton as Mark Jeffries
- Ann Dusenberry as Sharon Browne
- Ron Lombard as Gregg Lombardi
- Stu Krieger as Kurt Moriarty
- Myron Healey as Walter Craig
- Virginia Gregg as Nurse

== Release ==
The film was released theatrically in the United States by Cal-Am Artists in April 1978.

It was lauded by film critics upon its initial release, but prints no longer appear to be generally available, either on television or on video.
