= Frederick Coffin =

American actor (1943–2003)

- Born: Frederick D. Coffin; January 16, 1943; Detroit, Michigan, U.S.
- Died: July 31, 2003 (aged 60); Los Angeles, California, U.S.
- Other name: Holden McGuire
- Education: University of Michigan
- Occupation: Actor
- Years active: 1973–2003
- Spouse: Barbara Monte-Britton (1977–2003) (his death)

Frederick D. Coffin (January 16, 1943 – July 31, 2003) was an American film actor, singer, songwriter, and musician.

== Early life ==
Coffin was born in Detroit, Michigan in 1943 to actress Winifred Deforest Coffin and writer Dean Coffin, and was one of five children. He was educated at Western Reserve Academy in Hudson, Ohio, where he studied theater and was also a serious athlete, graduating in 1961. He enrolled the University of Michigan in 1962, where he intended to play football but instead decided to focus on acting, earning a B.A. then a master's degree in theater.

== Career ==
Coffin made his screen debut in 1973 when he appeared in the television film Much Ado About Nothing, an adaptation of the play, in which he also starred. He appeared in his first feature film in 1976 in the drama Dragonfly, with Beau Bridges and Susan Sarandon. His second feature was the Golden Globe nominated King of the Gypsies, with Shelley Winters. During the 1980s, Coffin appeared in several films: the horror film Alone in the Dark, which starred Donald Pleasence, Without a Trace, Mother's Day, Credited as Holden McGuire Nothing Lasts Forever, the biography film Jo Jo Dancer, Your Life Is Calling with Richard Pryor, the action comedy A Fine Mess with Ted Danson, and The Bedroom Window. In the 1990s, Coffin continued to appear in films, one of which he is known for is the comedy film Wayne's World, with Mike Myers and Dana Carvey, and the Steven Seagal film Hard to Kill. In 1999, Coffin would appear, in perhaps his best known role among millennials, as corrupt business man Parker Wyndham in the Disney Channel original movie Zenon: Girl of the 21st Century. He would appear in two final films before his death in 2003: View from the Top with Gwyneth Paltrow, and Identity with John Cusack.

Although, it was in fact television that Coffin appeared in mostly throughout his career, his first appearance in a television series was in Great Performances, which starred actors such as Walter Cronkite, who presented the series, Julie Andrews and Liza Minnelli. He also made guest appearances in many well known series including Kojak, Hill Street Blues, Moonlighting, The Twilight Zone, Remington Steele, Dallas, in which he appeared for six episodes, L.A. Law, The X-Files, Walker, Texas Ranger, Murder, She Wrote, Dr. Quinn, Medicine Woman, and the soap operas Ryan's Hope and The Edge of Night. He appeared as Buffalo hunter Big Zwey in the epic mini-series, Lonesome Dove.

Coffin starred in many television films including Under Siege, the 1989 miniseries Lonesome Dove and the 1995 film adaptation of A Streetcar Named Desire. He was originally cast as the voice of the father in the series Family Dog, he was later replaced by actor Martin Mull.

He also had roles in theater, including playing Eliot Rosewater in the 1979 premier of Ashman and Menken's musical adaptation of Kurt Vonnegut's God Bless You, Mr. Rosewater.

In 1997, he returned to his alma mater as that year's Knight Fellow, one of Western Reserve Academy's most distinguished honors.

Coffin was also a talented singer, songwriter, and musician.

== Personal life and death ==
Coffin was married to actress Barbara Monte-Britton from September 25, 1977, to his death on July 31, 2003, from lung cancer; he was a long-time chain smoker.

== Filmography ==
Film
Year	Title	Role	Notes
1976	Dragonfly	Walter Craigle	
1978	King of the Gypsies	Basketball Coach	
1980	Mother's Day	Ike	Credited as Holden McGuire
1981	Dead Ringer	Himself	Documentary film
1982	Alone in the Dark	Jim Gable	
1983	Without a Trace	Officer Coffin	
1984	Nothing Lasts Forever	Lunar Shopping Observer	
1986	Jo Jo Dancer, Your Life Is Calling	Dr. Weissman	
1986	A Fine Mess	Traffic Cop	
1987	The Bedroom Window	Detective Jessup	
1988	Shoot to Kill	Ralph	
1988	A Time of Destiny	Ed	
1989	Out Cold	Sergeant Haroldson	
1990	Hard to Kill	Lieutenant Kevin O'Malley	
1991	If Looks Could Kill	Lieutenant Colonel Larabee	
1991	V.I. Warshawski	Horton Grafalk	
1992	Wayne's World	Officer Koharski	
1994	There Goes My Baby	Mr. Maran	
1998	Memorial Day	Senator Jerald Lancaster	
1999	The Base	General Albert Becker	Direct-to-video
2003	View from the Top	Mr. Stewart	
2003	Identity	Detective Varole	(final film role)
Television
Year	Title	Role	Notes
1973	Much Ado About Nothing	Borachio	Television film
1974	Great Performances	Second Guard / Oswald	Episodes: "Antigone", "King Lear"
1977	Secret Service	Lieutenant Maxwell	Television film
1976–1977	Kojak	Lieutenant Bill Lee	Episodes: "A Shield for Murder: Parts 1 & 2", "Sister Maria"
1978	Once Upon a Classic	Sagramore	Episode: "A Connecticut Yankee in King Arthur's Court"
1980	The Jilting of Granny Weatherall	Dr. Harry	Television film
1980	Death Penalty	Eddie	Television film
1980	Ryan's Hope	Jim Hurley	Episodes: #1227, #1230, #1250
1982	Muggable Mary, Street Cop	Used Car Salesman	Television film
1983	An Invasion of Privacy	Alvin	Television film
1983	The Edge of Night	Stephen Markham	
1984	Concealed Enemies	Thomas Murphy	Television film
1984	Hill Street Blues	Tony Yankovich	Episode: "Ewe and Me, Babe"
1985	Scandal Sheet		Television film
1985	Moonlighting	Pawnbroker	Episode: "Pilot"
1985	Amos	Roland	Television film
1986	The Twilight Zone	Max	Episode: Season 1.14 - segment: "The Misfortune Cookie"
1986	Under Siege	Dan Murphy	Television film
1986	Remington Steele	Joe Gullickson	Episode: "Steele in the Running"
1986	Mr. and Mrs. Ryan	Beckerman	Television film
1986	The Deliberate Stranger	Jerry Thompson	Television film
1986	Comedy Factory	Lucas Hanlon	Episode: "Chameleon"
1986	Manhunt for Claude Dallas	Frank Weston	Television film
1987	Private Eye		Television film
1987	Crime Story	Slim Mahoney	Episode: "The Battle of Las Vegas"
1987	Amazing Stories	Al Lewis	Episode: "Such Interesting Neighbors"
1987	Dallas	Alfred Simpson	6 episodes
1987	Hunter	Lloyd Fredericks	Episodes: "City of Passion: Parts 1, 2 & 3"
1987	I Married Dora	'Buck'	Episode: "Guess Who's Coming to Dinner Forever?"
1988	The Days and Nights of Molly Dodd	Brian	Episode: "Here's a Message from Your Local Bag Lady"
1988	Something Is Out There	Charles Calvin	Episode: "Night of the Visitors"
1989	Fair Game	Rick Winchester	Television film
1989	Lonesome Dove	'Big Zwey'	4 episodes
1989	The Robert Guillaume Show		Episode: "Together Again"
1989	Jake and the Fatman	Clark Beaudine	Episode: "Side by Side"
1989	A Peaceable Kingdom	Pete Latham	Episode: "Chimp"
1989	Mancuso, F.B.I.	Sullivan	Episode: "Little Saigon"
1989	Settle the Score	Tucker	Television film
1990	The Young Riders	Sutro	Episode: "Unfinished Business"
1990	Glory Days	Mr. Lovejoy	Episode: "The Kids Are Allright"
1990	Crash: The Mystery of Flight 1501	Wes Goddard	Television film
1991	MacGyver	Karl Meredith	Episode: "Deadly Silents"
1992	The Commish	Joe McKellar	Episodes: "Adventures in the Skin Trade: Parts 1 & 2"
1987–1993	L.A. Law	Bill Novicky / John Shale	4 episodes
1993	Renegade		Episode: "Lyon's Roar"
1993	The X-Files	Chief Joe McGrath	Episode: "Fallen Angel"
1994	Secret Sins of the Father	L.J. Thielman	Television film
1994	Secret Sins of the Father	Father	Episode: "Ned Zed"
1994	Dragstrip Girl	Mr. Bickford	Television film
1994	Walker, Texas Ranger	Tate Brodie	Episode: "Rainbow Warrior"
1994	Texas	Zave	Television film
1995	A Streetcar Named Desire	Steve	Television film
1989–1996	Murder, She Wrote	Tim Mulligan / Tony Sable / Stanford Lomax / Lieutenant Roy Flint	4 episodes
1996	Murder One	Wayne Cormier	Episode: "Chapter Ten"
1996	Andersonville	Collins	Television film
1996	The Siege at Ruby Ridge	Doug Wilks	Television film
1997	Dr. Quinn, Medicine Woman	Danforth	Episode: "The Dam"
1997	Night Man		Episode: "Face to Face"
1999	Zenon: Girl of the 21st Century	Parker Wyndham	Television film
1999	Days of Our Lives	Warden	Episode: #8556
2000	Perfect Murder, Perfect Town		Television film
2000	Beyond Belief: Fact or Fiction	Sheriff Driscoll	"The FBI Story"
2000	The Invisible Man	Charlie Fogerty	Episode: "The Catevari"
2000	Rocket's Red Glare	Mitch Greer	Television film
2000	Bull	Wayne Wesley	Episode: "Final Hour"
2001	The District		Episode: "A Southern Town"
2001	Providence	Steven Zeller	Episode: "Home Sweet Home"
2001	Family Law	Doug Perliss	Episode: "Sacrifices"
2002	Diagnosis: Murder- Town without Pity	Mathew Campbell	Television film
2002	American Family		Episode: "La Llorona: Part 2"
2002	For the People	Mr. Cole	Episode: "Our Own"
2002	Presidio Med		Episode: "When Approaching a Let-Go"
2002	Jackie Chan Adventures	Mr. MacDonald	Episode: "When Pigs Fly"
Video Games
Year	Title	Role	Notes
1999	Land of the Lore III	Innkeeper/Morrison/The Last Man	Voice
2002	Star Wars Jedi Knight II: Jedi Outcast	Stormtrooper 1	Voice
