= Sasquatch, the Legend of Bigfoot =

- Theatrical release poster
- Directed by: Ed Ragozzino
- Written by: Ed Hawkins; Ronald D. Olson
- Produced by: Ronald D. Olson; John Fabian
- Starring: George Lauris; Steve Boergadine; Jim Bradford; Ken Kenzle; William Emmons; Joel Morello; Lou Salerini; Jim Coffin as Bigfoot
- Cinematography: Bill Farmer; John Fabian
- Edited by: John Fabian; Bill Farmer
- Music by: Al Capps; Lane Caudell
- Distributed by: North American Film Enterprises Inc.
- Release dates: January 28, 1976 (Eugene, Oregon); February 13, 1976 (U.S.)
- Running time: 102 minutes
- Country: United States
- Language: English
- Budget: c. $300,000

Sasquatch, also known as Sasquatch, the Legend of Bigfoot, is a 1976 American pseudo-documentary horror film directed by Ed Ragozzino and starring George Lauris, Steve Boergadine, and Jim Bradford. It follows a group of explorers on a summer-long search for the mythical Bigfoot creature. It was distributed by North American Film Productions, Oregon Ltd., at the height of public fascination with accounts and tales of Bigfoot sightings.

Though set in British Columbia, Canada, the film was shot in the Cascade Mountains near Bend, Oregon.

While sometimes compared to other Bigfoot documentary films of the era such as The Legend of Boggy Creek (1972) and Creature From Black Lake (1976), the film does not feature on-camera interviews with possible eyewitnesses.

== Plot ==
In a dense forest in the Pacific Northwest, numerous wildlife are agitated and on alert, by an unseen presence, whose large, human-like reflection is seen along a river.

A narrator from the fictional North American Wildlife Research organization in Oregon recounts the historical evidence of the Bigfoot, including the famous Patterson–Gimlin film, along with an announcement of the organization's own upcoming expedition. By running statistical data through modern computers, a site in northern British Columbia has been determined by the organization as the most likely spot for a population of Sasquatch to live undisturbed. An expedition is mounted, hoping to verify the creature's existence and secure funding for future research into the phenomenon.

The seven-man team is composed of Native American guide Techka Blackhawk, seasoned wilderness explorer Josh Bigsby, wise-cracking reporter Bob Vernon, anthropologist Dr. Paul Markham, cook Barney Snipe, animal handler Hank Parshall and team leader Chuck Evans who also narrates the film. The team is on horseback and brings tracking dogs to aid in the hunt.

As the film progresses, tales of Sasquatch encounters by earlier explorers are interwoven with the current expedition's adventure and told as campfire stories. These scenes are recreated by uncredited cast members and include the Ape Canyon incident in which miners are attacked while sleeping in their cabin and an encounter by early pioneer explorers Bauman and Jessup. Initially the expedition takes on the feel of a nature trek, but as we reach a scene where the team is traversing a hillside it takes on a more ominous feel. As rocks begin tumbling down towards them from above, Techka stops the caravan in time to avoid injuries but the cause of the rockslide is unknown. From this point on the film becomes more focused on its intended subject, the search for Bigfoot. After this incident the team feels they're being watched by 'someone or something' and everyone takes turns guarding the camp at night. One evening a bear attacks while they sleep and everyone is shaken up but none are seriously injured. On a subsequent evening the camp is once again attacked, but this time the lookout was able to scare off the attacker(s) with gunshots. The following day they find large footprints in the areas surrounding the camp and employ the tracking dogs. While some team members take plaster molds of the tracks, Hank and his dogs follow a scent to the base of a sheer rock wall but cannot continue due to the difficult terrain.

As the expedition nears their intended destination, they discover tall trees snapped in half well above human reach. Techka tells them it is a sign the Sasquatch use to mark their territory and upon entering the valley, the team finds more footprints and sets up camp. They install a tripwire system around the perimeter and post lookouts. The team notes that the forest is eerily quiet that evening and well after dark, the inevitable happens. Multiple sensors begin to light up, the camp is attacked and we hear the same haunting wail as earlier. As the lookouts scramble for a clear shot with their tranquilizer guns, large boulders and branches are thrown in from multiple directions. Paul Markham is injured by one of the rocks and one of the shadowy creatures actually invades the camp and destroys most of the surveillance equipment. The attackers are eventually scared off and when daylight comes the team gets a good look at the devastation. There are many footprints around the camp but no signs of a dead or wounded Sasquatch. By now summer is almost over and winter storms are looming so the team packs up and begins their long trek back to civilization. In the final scene the camera pans out to a wide shot of the team departing, showcasing a picturesque view of the valley and its surrounding mountains. During the closing credits we see a large human-like silhouette, the same one seen in promotional movie posters, looking down at the camera from a hilltop as it slowly turns and walks away.

== Cast ==
- George Lauris as Chuck Evans
- Steve Boergadine as Hank Parshall
- Jim Bradford as Barney Snipe
- Ken Kienzle as Josh Bigsby
- William Emmons as Dr Paul Markham
- Joel Morello as Techka Blackhawk
- Lou Salerni as Bob Vernon
- Jim Coffin as Sasquatch

== Production ==
The film was shot in 1975 in Bend and Sisters, Oregon on a budget of around $300,000. The film's producer, Ronald Olson, was a real-life bigfoot researcher who founded the Eugene, Oregon-based North American Wildlife Research Company. Olson's father was the founder of American National Enterprises, a Salt Lake City-based film production company that specialized in nature documentaries.

Animals were supplied by Dick Robinson who, along with Sasquatch co-producer and editor John Fabian, went on to make a Grizzly Adams-type film "The Life and Legend of Buffalo Jones". That film was also co-directed by Sasquatch cast member / narrator George Lauris and its soundtrack contains music by Sasquatch contributors Al Capps & Lane Caudell. The "Life and Legend of Buffalo Jones" film ultimately became known as Buffalo Rider.

== Soundtrack ==
The film's soundtrack is a combination of serene 1970s folk / country and blockbuster-style orchestral music. The title track, "High in the Mountains", was written and performed by Al Capps and Lane Caudell and was available on vinyl 45's for a limited time.

== Release ==
The film was originally released by North American Film Enterprises Inc., and opened in Eugene, Oregon on January 28, 1976, after which it was released on February 13, 1976.

=== Home media ===
Distributors such as RetroMedia, RetroFlix, Image Entertainment and VCI Home Video have re-released it on DVD. A remastered version complete with an additional six minute introduction sequence (shown separately from the main picture) was released by Code Red on Blu-Ray in late 2016. It featured a scene that had been in the original theatrical release showing a young Native-American boy being pursued by a Sasquatch. The scene was thought lost for many years.

== See also ==
- Peter C. Byrne

== Sources ==
- Albright, Brian (2012). Regional Horror Films, 1958-1990: A State-by-State Guide with Interviews. Jefferson, North Carolina: McFarland. ISBN 978-1-476-60042-0.
- Long, Greg (2004). The Making of Bigfoot: The Inside Story. New York City, New York: Prometheus Books. ISBN 978-1-615-92374-8.
