= Al Capps =

American record producer, musician and singer (1939–2018)

- Born: Allan Alfonzo Capps; April 26, 1939; Arkansas, U.S.
- Died: June 7, 2018 (aged 79) Michigan, U.S.
- Occupations: Record producer, arranger, songwriter
- Instruments: Multi-instrumentalist, vocalist

Allan Alfonzo Capps (April 26, 1939 – June 7, 2018) was an American record producer, arranger, songwriter, multi-instrumentalist, and vocalist. Beginning in the 1960s and 1970s, he produced and arranged albums for popular artists such as Cher, Andy Williams, Helen Reddy, José Feliciano, Vicki Lawrence, and Liza Minnelli, and delivered film music for more than twenty films. As a musician, he played on albums by The Everly Brothers, Gábor Szabó, and Frank Sinatra. Later in life, he made music for commercials of international brands.

== Biography ==
Capps produced and arranged albums for many artists, including Andy Williams, Helen Reddy, Vikki Carr, José Feliciano, Liza Minnelli, The Osmonds, Cher, Jennifer Warnes, The Lennon Sisters, The Ventures, and The Cats. In the seventies he was a fixed arranger of Snuff Garrett.

During sessions he sometimes took part in the background choir, such as on the album Introducing of Sparks. He also is a multi-instrumentalist and played on records by The Everly Brothers, Gábor Szabó, Bobby Vinton, and Frank Sinatra among others. He also recorded music himself, such as in 1971 the promo single of Jesus Christ, Superstar (cover version).

He made film music for more than twenty films, including The Windsplitter (1971), Sasquatch, the Legend of Bigfoot (1977), Buffalo Rider (1978), Smokey and the Bandit II (1980), Sharky's Machine (1981), The Cannonball Run (1981), Stroker Ace (1983), and Flawless (1999), and a handful of television films.

Capps was working in the music industry as late as 2014. In 2007 he issued the album Great Easy-Listening Hits Of The '60s under the name The Al Capps Orchestra. In his later years he also made music for commercials of brands such as Pepsi, Mercedes Swatch, Cadillac, Budweiser, and Hilton.
