= Hal England =

American actor

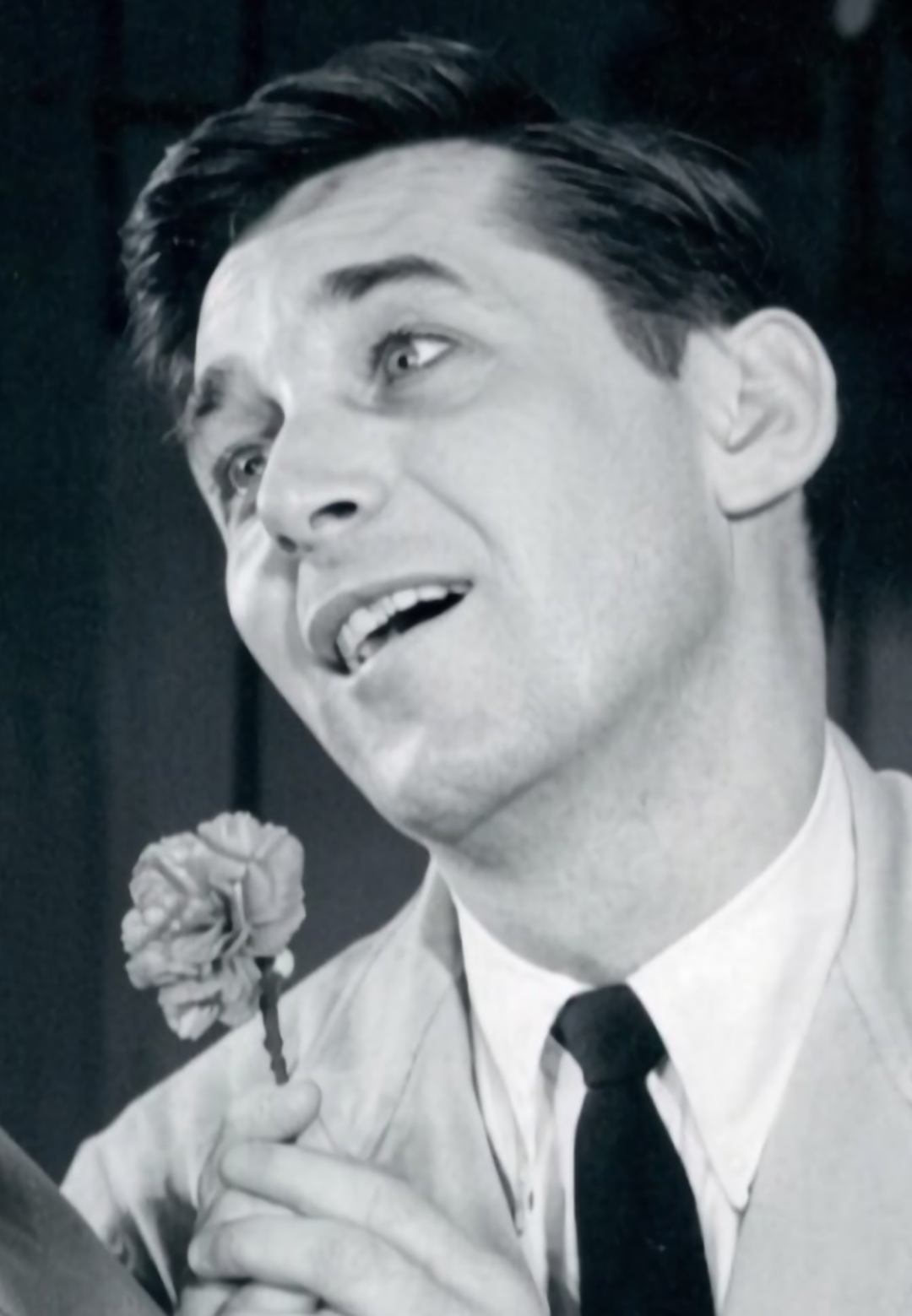
- England in 1964
- Born: Harold Franklin England; October 2, 1932; Kings Mountain, North Carolina, U.S.
- Died: November 6, 2003 (aged 71); Burbank, California, U.S.
- Education: University of North Carolina at Chapel Hill
- Occupation: Actor

Harold Franklin England (October 2, 1932 – November 6, 2003) was an American actor.

== Personal life and death ==
He was born on October 23, 1932 to W. F. England and Della Irene England in Kings Mountain, North Carolina. He attended Kings Mountain High School and graduated with honors. After graduating from high school, he enrolled at Mars Hill Junior College to study for the ministry, but left a year later to study pre-law at the University of North Carolina at Chapel Hill. After a year of pre-law, he switched to dramatics and joined the campus theater group Carolina Playmakers. He graduated with a bachelor of arts degree in dramatic arts. He died on November 6, 2003, of heart failure at Providence Saint Joseph Medical Center. Fred W. Bennett, a producer, was his life partner for forty years.

== Career ==
After graduating from university, England went to New York and starred in a number of off-Broadway productions, including Candide and The Seagull. He understudied Robert Morse for two years in the Broadway production How to Succeed in Business Without Really Trying, and then starred in several Broadway productions including Love Me Little, Say Darling, and The Beggars Opera. He was a life member of the Actors Studio.

England also had over 100 guest starring roles in television, and appeared in over 200 TV commercials. He once had a lawsuit brought against him for $25,000 by Kentucky Fried Chicken, which he had completed a commercial for, for breach of contract, because he had also completed a commercial for their rival McDonald's; it was later settled out of court.

On November 5, 1970, he played the character warlock, Waldo, in the Bewitched episode, "Samantha's Bad Day in Salem."

== Filmography ==
Year	Title	Role	Notes
1968	Hang 'Em High	Brother	
1972	Deadhead Miles	Driver of Wrecked Car	
1972	The Dirt Gang	Sidney	
1990	The Bonfire of the Vanities	French Restaurant Patron	
1991	Going Under	General Telephone	
