= Winifred Deforest Coffin =

American character actress

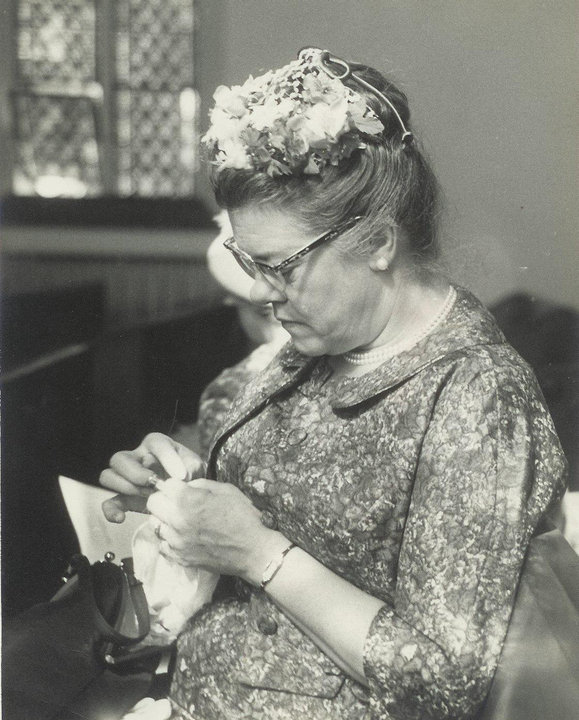
- Born: Winifred Deforest; October 16, 1911; Chicago, Illinois, US
- Died: December 18, 1986 (aged 75); Birmingham, Michigan, US
- Other names: Winnie Collins, Winifred Collins
- Education: Connecticut College (BA)
- Occupation: Actress
- Years active: 1922–1976
- Spouse: Dean Fiske Coffin
- Children: Fred Coffin and 4 others

Winifred "Winnie" Deforest Coffin (October 16, 1911– December 18, 1986) was an American character actress who did not start her Hollywood career until 1960 at age 50. She appeared on a number of television shows, including The Red Skelton Show, The Ann Sothern Show and Adam-12 and movies such as Eight on the Lam, Angel in My Pocket, and Now You See Him, Now You Don't.

== Biography ==
=== Early life and education ===
Coffin was born to Fred Bowden Deforest and his wife. Her mother committed suicide when she was nine. At one time, the family lived on Lake Shore Drive. Coffin attended Connecticut College and earned her bachelor's degree in 1933. In 1929, while still a freshman, she met Brown University student Dean Fiske Coffin, son of former Republican Congressman Howard A. Coffin. Dean was eight hours late to their blind date because Brown had won a football game against Princeton and he wanted to celebrate. He apologized profusely "after seeing her" and they rescheduled for the following week. They married on April 7, 1934, at the Fourth Presbyterian Church in Chicago before moving to Birmingham, Michigan, where all 5 of their children were born.

=== Career ===
Coffin started acting while in college and continued to act in community theatre productions following graduation, but she became serious about it in the early 1950s, when her younger sons were teenagers. Some of the local productions she worked on were None of Them is Perfect (1935); Light Up the Sky (1950); Carousel (1950); Courage Was the Fashion (1951); The Child Buyer (1964); and Cinderella. She worked with companies including St. Dunstan's Theatre Guild, Birmingham Players, Ridgedale Players, and the Detroit Players.

In 1959, while acting at Cranbrook's Greek Theatre in The Bloomingham Eccentrics, a play written and directed by her husband, Coffin was noticed by Hollywood writer DeVallon Scott. Scott was impressed and called his agent Al Kingston after the show to tell him about Coffin. Not long after, she moved to Hollywood, where she quickly found success. Dean, the vice-president of Jam Handy's film company, resigned from his job in 1965 to join her; as a writer and director, he found himself in an oversaturated market. The couple rented an apartment on Hollywood Boulevard on a property formerly owned by Douglas Fairbanks and Mary Pickford. She worked mainly in television and was a regular guest on The Red Skelton Show. She was also in Bonanza, Bewitched, Lancer, and Perry Mason, among others. Her last Hollywood appearance was on The Tonight Show Starring Johnny Carson in 1972.

At the Birmingham Arts Festival in June 1962, Coffin starred in The Bloomingham Newcomers, the sequel to the 1959 The Bloomingham Eccentrics. She also taught acting at Oakland University's Division of Continuing Education.

=== Final years and death ===
After 10 years of living in the Los Angeles smog and a lifetime of smoking, Coffin developed a degenerative lung condition and emphysema, and she and her husband moved back to Detroit in 1972. While visiting her son Tris and his family in Dedham, Massachusetts, in 1980, she collapsed and was taken to Massachusetts General Hospital. She was transferred to the nearby Spaulding Rehabilitation Hospital, "where she received extensive pulmonary rehabilitation. Following her time in the hospital, Coffin wrote and narrated films for Hospice of Southeastern Michigan and the American Lung Association to help patients cope with chronic lung disease. The following year, she began using a stationary oxygen tank, as her lungs were functioning at only 20% capacity. She died on December 18, 1986, in her Birmingham, Michigan, home. At her death, she was survived by her 5 children, 6 grandchildren, 2 great-grandchildren, and a niece. One of her great-grandchildren is named after her.

=== Family ===
Winnie and Dean had five children, four of whom were sets of twins: Cella, their only daughter; Howard Alrich II (named after his grandfather) and Tristram "Tris"; and William "Bill" and Fred (1933). They became grandparents in 1968 when Tris and his wife Mary had twins. One of his sons, Alexander, was diagnosed with cancer as a young child and met Ronald Reagan in 1985 after writing him to sympathize with his cancer diagnosis. Alexander raised $6,000 for the American Cancer Society's Ta-Kum-Ta, a camp for kids with cancer, and died in June 1986 at age 14 from a brain tumor. Dean Coffin died in 1992 and their son Fred died in 2003 of lung cancer.

== Filmography ==
=== TV ===
Year	Title	Role	Episodes	Notes	Ref
??	Gunsmoke				
1960	Riverboat	Mrs. Donlan	"The Sellout"	Uncredited	
1960	The Ann Sothern Show	Miss Bentley	2		
1960	Route 66	Mrs. Hastings	"Three Sides"		
1960—1961	The Many Loves of Dobie Gillis	Bridge Player/Dr. Carlotta Kaggel	2		
1961	The Detectives	Charwoman	"Power Failure"		
1965	Honey West	Masseuse	"The Swingin' Mrs. Jones"		
1965	Bewitched	Nanny Witch	"My Grandson, the Warlock"		
1965	Bonanza	Widow Smith/Edna Brown	2		
1965	Perry Mason	Willa Saint Sutton	"The Casa of the Wrathful Wraith"		
1966	Petticoat Junction	Mrs. Jessop	"Betty Jo Catches the Bouquet"		
1966	Death Valley Days	Bessie Brenner	"The Resurrection of Deadwood Dick"		
1968	The Red Skelton Show	Mother-in-Law (Silent Spot)	10		
1968	The High Chaparral	Woman #1	"Tornado Frances"		
1970	The Beverly Hillbillies	Mrs. Bertha Hewes	"The Clampett-Hewes Empire"		
1970	Lancer	Anne 'Gus' Guthrie	"The Lorelei"		
1970	My Three Sons	Effie Springer	"Charley's Cello"		
1970	The Debbie Reynolds Show	Grandma Morton	"The Producer"		
1971	The Doris Day Show	Agnes/Clara Bixby	2		
1971—1972	Adam-12	Mrs. Ruth Fowler/Mrs. Kovacs/Mrs. Sullivan	3		
1972	The Tonight Show Starring Johnny Carson			Spoof of Nicholas and Alexandra	

=== Films ===
Year	Title	Role	Notes	Ref
1966	Brigadoon		Television movie	
1967	Eight on the Lam			
1969	Angel in My Pocket			
1971	The Million Dollar Duck	Agitated Woman Driver	Uncredited	
1972	Now You See Him, Now You Don't	Secretary	Uncredited	
