= C. Lindsay Workman =

American actor (1924–2012)

- Workman in The Brady Bunch as Mr. Bertram Grossman in 1970
- Born: March 6, 1924; Pittsburgh, Pennsylvania, U.S.
- Died: April 24, 2012 (aged 88); Claremont, California, U.S.
- Resting place: Oak Park Cemetery in Claremont, California, U.S.
- Occupation: Actor

Charles Lindsay Workman (March 6, 1924 – April 24, 2012) was a character and voice actor who had a career in film and television that started in the 1950s and continued until the early 1990s. He has over 100 credits, and was often credited as Lindsay Workman.

== Background ==
Workman was a prolific character actor, especially during the 1960s and 1970s as he acted in dozens of guest roles in television series'. As a voice actor, he did roles for Garfield and Mercedes Benz.

He grew up in Pittsburgh, Pennsylvania. While still a child, he got his introduction to radio. He attended Pomona College and Yale University and there he studied literature and acting. During the 1950s, he was a member of the Scripps College theater department faculty. A family man, he was married and was the father of two children. He had also been active member of the Pacific Pioneer Broadcasters, something that meant a lot to him. He did community volunteering work for the Boy Scouts in the Los Angeles Area Council, and received awards for his service.

== Career ==
One of his earliest roles was in the television series, Blondie, playing the part of Mr. Knapp in the episode "Howdy Neighbor" in 1957. Also that year, he appeared in the series Sergeant Preston of the Yukon. He also appeared on the TV Western Gunsmoke.

In the late 1960s, he had a recurring role as Reverend Adams in Here Come the Brides. (TV)ADAM 12-minister [1973] “ RAMPART division-S6:E2 During the 1970s, he had a recurring role in the series Julia as Otto Brockmeyer.

He had a part in the Paul Wendkos made-for-television film, The Five of Me which was released in 1981.

His last credit appears to be as Dr. Roger Furney in "Episode #1.4813" of The Young and the Restless.

== Death ==
He died on April 24, 2012, in Claremont, California at the age of 88 following a short illness.

== Filmography ==
Year	Title	Role	Notes
1957	The Book of Acts Series	Silas	
1960	Spring Affair	Wilbur Crane	
1961	The Explosive Generation	Science Teacher	Uncredited
1965	At the End of the Rainbow	Prof. Antonio	
1967	Doctor, You've Got to Be Kidding!	Courtney	Uncredited
1973	Westworld	Supervisor	
1978	Buffalo Rider	Narrator	Voice
1978	The One Man Jury	Judge	
1991	The Naked Gun 2½: The Smell of Fear	Maitre'd	
