= Buffalo Rider =

1978 film

- Directed by: John Fabian; Dick Robinson; Dramatic sequences: George Lauris
- Written by: Mollie Gregory; Narration: Bill McCallum; Jim Cisler; Tom Manning; Peter Powell; Pete Cornacchia
- Produced by: John Fabian; Dick Robinson
- Starring: Rick Guinn
- Narrated by: C. Lindsay Workman
- Cinematography: Bill Farmer; George Griner; Greg McKay
- Edited by: John Fabian
- Music by: Al Capps
- Distributed by: Starfire Films
- Release date: November 1, 1976
- Running time: 89 minutes
- Country: United States
- Language: English

Buffalo Rider is a 1976 American Western film co-directed by John Fabian, George Lauris and Dick Robinson. The film's character of Buffalo Jones bears no relation to Charles "Buffalo" Jones who the producers did not know existed until years after.

== Plot ==
Buffalo Rider Tells the story of a man named Buffalo Jones with Rick Guinn playing the role of Jones. Jones is depicted as a loner who tames and rides a buffalo and hunts down murderous buffalo hunters.

== Cast ==
- Rick Guinn as Jake "Buffalo" Jones
- John Freeman as Frank Nesbitt
- Rich Scheeland as Ralph Pierce
- George Sager as Ted Clayborn
- Dick Robinson as Sam Robinson
- Priscilla Lauris as Mrs. Robinson
- C. Lindsay Workman (voice) as Narrator
- Hal Smith (voice) as Old buffalo hunter

== Reception ==
The film has received negative reviews. Chris Higgins of Mental Floss wrote that "given all the animal 'stunts' (including what sure looks like actually shooting buffalo and various cross-species animal fights) it wouldn't pass muster today. The movie itself is a bit sub par, featuring an extreme over-reliance on narration and a sort of meandering documentary-ish treatment with some buffalo-related dramatic elements tossed in." The film was featured in a Gizmodo article of "the weirdest thing on the internet tonight" where Andrew Tarantola wrote, "Enjoy the heartwarming tale of a man, conveniently named Buffalo Jones, and his buffalo, named Buffalo. No wait. Its name is Samson, because that's so much more original. Whatever you call them, the two chum around the American frontier, saving babies and stuff for an hour and a half (even though the script was apparently only about 15 pages long)."

== In popular culture ==
On November 22, 2011, the film was released as a video on demand from RiffTrax. This edition features a satirical commentary done by comedians and actors Michael J. Nelson, Kevin Murphy and Bill Corbett.

In 2011, the Austin-based band The Possum Posse created "Guy on a Buffalo", a narrated song set to clips from the movie Buffalo Rider. A clip from Part 3 of "Guy on a Buffalo" was used in Season 3 Episode 6 "All For Nothing" of the hit series Yellowstone inspiring the ranch hands to try and go buffalo riding.

== Home media ==
BUFFALO RIDER was released on Cobra Video in Australia in the PAL format. The company did not add a release date for the video on the insert art sleeve or the videocassette label. The sleeve art says "copyright 1977 STARFIRE FILMS INC." in very small print on the front and there is no top label on the tape. The company only attached a spine label to the videocassette with the mis-printed title 'BUFFALO RIDERS' (sic).

Cobra Video and Marketing was located at "1A-2 111 Pacific Highway, Hornsby, N.S.W. 2077". ['N.S.W.' is short for 'New South Wales'].

== See also ==
- Revisionist Western
- Bison
