= Nesdon Booth =

American film and television actor

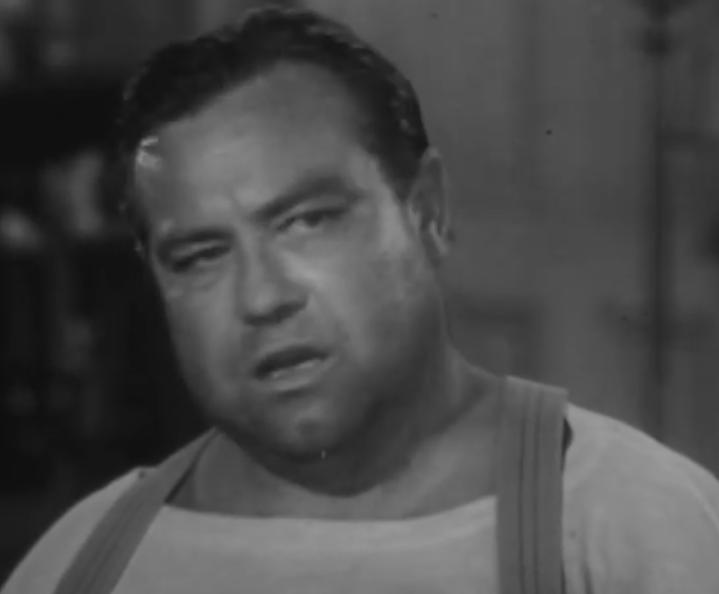
- Booth in Medic, 1955
- Born: Nesdon Foye Booth; September 1, 1918; Baker City, Oregon, U.S.
- Died: March 25, 1964 (aged 45); Hollywood, California, U.S.
- Occupations: Film and television actor

Nesdon Foye Booth (September 1, 1918 – March 25, 1964) was an American film and television actor. He appeared in over 100 films and television programs, and was known for his recurring role as Frank the bartender in the American western television series Cimarron City.

Booth died on March 25, 1964 in Hollywood, California, at the age of 45.

== Partial filmography ==
- City Across the River (1949) - Boy (uncredited)
- The Girl in White (1952) - Sailor (uncredited)
- Sally and Saint Anne (1952) - Fight Fan (uncredited)
- The Glass Wall (1953) - Monroe
- I Love Melvin (1953) - Police Captain (uncredited)
- The 49th Man (1953) - Sheriff Ramirez (uncredited)
- Executive Suite (1954) - Guest (uncredited)
- Rogue Cop (1954) - Detective Garrett
- Black Widow (1954) - Police A.P.B. Man (uncredited)
- Pete Kelly's Blues (1955) - Squat Henchman (uncredited)
- I Died a Thousand Times (1955) - Tom (uncredited)
- I'll Cry Tomorrow (1955) - Pawnbroker (uncredited)
- Three Bad Sisters (1956) - Coroner (uncredited)
- The Price of Fear (1956) - Gorin (uncredited)
- Santiago (1956) - Burns
- These Wilder Years (1956) - Pool Room Proprietor (uncredited)
- Funny Face (1957) - Southern Man (uncredited)
- Mister Cory (1957) - Fat Man (uncredited)
- The Shadow on the Window (1957) - Conway the Truck Driver (uncredited)
- Reform School Girl (1957) - Deetz
- The Brothers Rico (1957) - Burly Man (uncredited)
- Raintree County (1957) - Spectator (uncredited)
- Escape from Red Rock (1957) - Pete Archer
- Alfred Hitchcock Presents (1958) (Season 3 Episode 29: "Fatal Figures") - Shopkeeper
- Sing Boy Sing (1958) - Police Desk Sergeant (uncredited)
- Too Much, Too Soon (1958) - Spectator (uncredited)
- Cattle Empire (1958) - Barkeep
- Damn Yankees (1958) - Baseball Game Spectator (uncredited)
- Rio Bravo (1959) - Clark
- The Big Circus (1959) - Jules Borman (uncredited)
- The FBI Story (1959) - Sandy the Driver (uncredited)
- Yellowstone Kelly (1959) - Reed the Burly Soldier (uncredited)
- The Rise and Fall of Legs Diamond (1960) - Fence/Pawnbroker (uncredited)
- Bells Are Ringing (1960) - Mike the Coffee Shop Proprietor (uncredited)
- Let No Man Write My Epitaph (1960) - Mike the Saloon Owner (uncredited)
- The Wackiest Ship in the Army (1960) - Chief Petty Officer (uncredited)
- One-Eyed Jacks (1961) - Townsman (uncredited)
- Ada (1961) - Walter Dow
- Claudelle Inglish (1961) - Farmer in Peasley's Store (uncredited)
- Gun Street (1961) - Mayor Phillips
- Alfred Hitchcock Presents (1962) (Season 7 Episode 32: "Victim Four") - Bartender
- Walk on the Wild Side (1962) - Guard in Teresina's Cafe (uncredited)
- Billy Rose's Jumbo (1962) - Marshall (uncredited)
- Critic's Choice (1963) - Minor Role (uncredited)
- What a Way to Go! (1964) - Restaurant Patron (uncredited)
- The Greatest Story Ever Told (1965) - (uncredited)
