= Jack Rose (screenwriter) =

American screenwriter (1911–1995)

- Born: November 4, 1911; Warsaw, Russian Empire
- Died: October 20, 1995 (aged 83); Los Angeles, California, U.S.
- Occupations: Screenwriter, film producer

Jack Rose (November 4, 1911 – October 20, 1995) was an American screenwriter and producer. He began writing gags for Milton Berle and radio lines for Bob Hope before moving to screenplays. His first was 1943's Road to Rio starring Hope and Bing Crosby. In 1955, Rose produced the Hope film The Seven Little Foys, co-written and directed by his frequent collaborator Melville Shavelson. He also wrote and produced a 1962 Dean Martin romantic comedy, Who's Got the Action?

For television, Rose created and wrote for the 1968–1970 situation comedy The Good Guys, starring Bob Denver, Herb Edelman, and Joyce Van Patten. It ran for 42 episodes over one-and-a-half seasons.

Rose was nominated for Academy Awards three times for The Seven Little Foys, 1958's Houseboat, and 1973's A Touch of Class.
