= Gail Parent =

American screenwriter (born 1940)

- Born: Gail Kostner; August 12, 1940 (age 86); New York City, U.S.
- Occupations: Screenwriter, television producer

Gail Parent (born August 12, 1940) is an American television screenwriter, producer, and author.

== Life and career ==
Parent was born Gail Kostner in New York City, New York, the daughter of Ruth (née Goldberg) and Theodore Kostner, a Wall Street executive. Parent is Jewish. Parent's writing career began in the 1960s where she teamed up with writer Kenny Solms. Her big break came when she began writing for The Carol Burnett Show. She later went on to write for other TV shows including a 1971 episode of The Mary Tyler Moore Show. The following year her novel Sheila Levine is Dead and Living in New York, which chronicled its unattractive, overweight, Jewish heroine's romantic misadventures in Manhattan, became a best-seller that later served as the basis of a film starring Jeannie Berlin. Although the screenplay was adapted by someone else, she penned the scripts for Barbra Streisand's The Main Event (1979) and Confessions of a Teenage Drama Queen (2004).

Parent wrote "David Meyer is a Mother" (1976) Parent co-wrote the book for the 1974 musical Lorelei. It is her sole Broadway credit.

Parent's greatest success has been in television, most notably with The Golden Girls and Tracey Ullman's sketch comedy series Tracey Takes On..., serving as a producer and writer for both. She also wrote episodes of The Smothers Brothers Show, The Carol Burnett Show, Rhoda, Steven Spielberg's Amazing Stories, Babes (of which she also served as series creator) and Finder of Lost Loves, and the musical variety special Sills and Burnett at the Met (1976). With Ann Marcus, she co-created the 1976-77 soap opera satire Mary Hartman, Mary Hartman. With Kenny Solms, she created the 1970 situation comedy The Tim Conway Show. During the 1990-91 television season, Parent and Los Angeles newscaster Kelly Lange co-hosted the Kelly and Gail talk show which aired on KNBC-TV.

Parent is the winner of a CableACE Award and two Emmys, and has been nominated for an additional twelve Emmys and two Writers Guild of America Awards.
