= Ron Friedman (producer) =

American television writer and producer (1932–2025)

- Born: Ronald Irwin Friedman; August 1, 1932; Pittsburgh, Pennsylvania, U.S.
- Died: September 15, 2025 (aged 93); Los Angeles, California, U.S.
- Education: Carnegie Mellon University (B.A.)
- Occupations: Television producer, television writer, voice actor
- Years active: 1965–1995
- Spouses: Valerie Friedman
- Children: 3

Ronald Irwin Friedman (/ˈfriːdmən/; August 1, 1932 – September 15, 2025) was an American television and film producer and writer. He was known for his work on such animated television shows as G.I. Joe, The Transformers, Iron Man, and Fantastic Four as well as the animated film The Transformers: The Movie.

== Background ==
Ronald Irwin Friedman was born on August 1, 1932. He attended Carnegie Mellon University, graduating with a bachelor of arts degree in architecture.

== Career ==
Ronald Irwin Friedman wrote over 700 hours of episodes for many television series, such as The Andy Griffith Show, The Good Guys, Bewitched, Gilligan's Island, All in the Family, The Odd Couple, Happy Days and That's My Mama.

In animation, Ron Friedman created the G.I. Joe: A Real American Hero animated series and co-wrote G.I. Joe: The Movie as well. He developed the Generation 1 Transformers animated series, with him re-writing over 64 episodes. He co-wrote The Transformers: The Movie, which had two initial drafts. Both drafts have the basic structure of the film, but with many different characters, elements, and details compared to the final result. He also worked with Stan Lee to create The Marvel Action Hour. Friedman also had 42 feature scripts to his name, the last of which was purchased by West Coast Film Partners for production in early 2011.

He was nominated for multiple Emmy Awards, and won several WGA Awards.

Ron Friedman appeared twice on Gilbert Gottfried's audio podcast (Gilbert Gottfried's Amazing Colossal Podcast), and on Mark Evanier's video podcast in September 2020. He told many anecdotes while working in the industry. In his first appearance in Gottfried's podcast, he recounted his experience with Lucille Ball telling him about her then-husband Desi Arnaz pulling a gun on Orson Welles and threatening to kill him if he did not deliver the long-promised script for The Fountain of Youth in 1956.

Ron Friedman died from cardiopulmonary arrest in Woodland Hills, Los Angeles, on September 15, 2025, at the age of 93.

== Screenwriting credits ==
=== Television ===
- My Favorite Martian (1965)
- Get Smart (1965–1966)
- Bewitched (1965–1967)
- Gilligan’s Island (1966–1967)
- The Andy Griffith Show (1966–1967)
- Love on a Rooftop (1967)
- The Second Hundred Years (1967)
- I Dream of Jeannie (1967–1969)
- The Good Guys (1969)
- The Ghost & Mrs. Muir (1969)
- The Partridge Family (1970–1971)
- The Odd Couple (1970–1973)
- Funny Face (1971)
- The Good Life (1971)
- Getting Together (1971)
- Me and the Chimp (1972)
- The Super (1972)
- Bridget Loves Bernie (1972)
- Love, American Style (1972–1973)
- Bob & Carol & Ted & Alice (1973)
- Dusty’s Trail (1973)
- Lotsa Luck (1974)
- All in the Family (1974)
- That’s My Mama (1974–1975)
- Chico and the Man (1974–1978)
- Barney Miller (1975)
- Happy Days (1975)
- Grady (1976)
- Big John, Little John (1976)
- Wonder Woman (1976)
- All's Fair (1976–1977)
- Starsky & Hutch (1976–1978)
- The San Pedro Beach Bums (1977)
- Charlie’s Angels (1977)
- Vegas (1978)
- Fantasy Island (1978–1981)
- The Dukes of Hazzard (1979)
- B. J. and the Bear (1980)
- Harper Valley PTA (1981)
- Strike Force (1982)
- Ace Crawford, Private Eye (1983)
- 9 to 5 (1983)
- Small & Frye (1983)
- The Fall Guy (1983–1985)
- G.I. Joe: A Real American Hero (1983–1986)
- Lime Street (1985)
- American Playhouse (1987)
- Bionic Six (1987)
- Sledge Hammer! (1987)
- Zorro (1990)
- G.I. Joe: A Real American Hero (1990)
- The New WKRP in Cincinnati (1992–1993)
- Fantastic Four (1994)
- Iron Man (1994)
- Legend (1995)
- Taz-Mania (1995)

=== Film ===
- Lucy in London (1966)
- The Wackiest Wagon Train in the West (1976)
- Record City (1978)
- Waikiki (1980)
- Murder Can Hurt You (1980)
- The Romance of Betty Boop (1985)
- The Transformers: The Movie (1986)
- G.I. Joe: The Movie (1987)

== See also ==
- Hypnotia, a character he created
