= Dusty's Trail =

- Genre: Comedy/Western
- Created by: Elroy Schwartz; Sherwood Schwartz
- Written by: John Fenton Murray; Austin Kalish; Irma Kalish; Larry Rhine; Al Schwartz; Elroy Schwartz; Sherwood Schwartz
- Directed by: Jack Arnold; Earl Bellamy; Bruce Bilson; Russ Mayberry; Leslie H. Martinson; Richard Michaels; Oscar Rudolph
- Starring: Bob Denver; Forrest Tucker; Ivor Francis; Jeannine Riley; Lori Saunders; Lynn Wood; Bill Cort
- Theme music composer: Ross Schwartz; Sherwood Schwartz
- Composers: Frank De Vol; Jack Pleis
- Country of origin: United States
- Original language: English
- No. of seasons: 1
- No. of episodes: 26

Production
- Executive producer: Sherwood Schwartz
- Producer: Elroy Schwartz
- Cinematography: Alan Stensvold
- Camera setup: Single-camera
- Running time: 24 mins.
- Production companies: Metromedia Producers Corporation; Redwood Productions; Writer First Productions

Original release
- Network: Syndication
- Release: September 11, 1973 – March 12, 1974

Related
- The Wackiest Wagon Train in the West

Dusty's Trail is an American Western/comedy series starring Bob Denver and Forrest Tucker that aired in syndication from September 11, 1973 to March 12, 1974. The series is a western-themed reworking of Denver's previous series Gilligan's Island.

The series, set in the 1880s, is about a small, diverse cluster of lost travelers who become separated from their wagon train. Country music singer Mel Street sang the theme song.

== Storyline ==
Two coachmen and five passengers of a wagon become separated from their wagon train on the way to California in the 1880s. The group includes wagonmaster Mr. Callahan and his shotgun lookout Dusty, Mr. and Mrs. Brookhaven (a wealthy Eastern banker and his wife), a book smart civil engineer named Andy, dance-hall girl Lulu McQueen, and farm girl Betsy. The show follows their adventures while they attempt to return to their wagon train. According to the theme song, "Dusty's the reason for their plight, thanks to Dusty – nothing's right".

== Cast ==
- Bob Denver as Dusty (The Gilligan role)
- Forrest Tucker as Mr Callahan (The Skipper role)
- Ivor Francis as Carson Brookhaven (The Thurston Howell III role)
- Lynn Wood as Daphne Brookhaven (The Mrs Howell role)
- Jeannine Riley as Lulu McQueen (The Ginger role)
- Bill Cort as Andy Boone (The Professor role)
- Lori Saunders as Betsy McGuire (The Mary Ann role)

== Episodes ==
No. in season	Title	Directed by	Written by	Original release date
1	"The Not So Magnificent Seven"	Earl Bellamy	Sherwood Schwartz, Elroy Schwartz	September 11, 1973
The wagoners stumble upon a ghost town. While they try to find out the reason for the abandonment, one of the wagoners believes that it was not a disaster or economic bust like most ghost towns, but that the people were forced to leave. This proves all too correct, as they then encounter three gunmen who hold the town hostage.
2	"There Is Nothing Like a Dame"	Bruce Bilson	Howard Ostroff	September 18, 1973
Two cattle thieves try to rustle up some women and the others have to lead a cavalry charge to save them.
3	"Horse of Another Color"	Oscar Rudolph	Brad Radnitz	September 25, 1973
Dusty catches a wild horse and tries to tame it, but then the horse's owner shows up with a marshal, ready to hang him as a horse thief.
4	"Treasure of C. Harry Motley"	Bruce Bilson	David P. Harmon	October 2, 1973
Dusty's discovery of a treasure map brings out everyone's greed.
5	"Duel for Daphne"	Leslie H. Martinson	Larry Rhine, Al Schwartz	October 9, 1973
Dusty and an Indian headdress cause a misunderstanding that leads Mr. Brookhaven to challenge Callahan to a duel over Mrs. Brookhaven's affections.
6	"Love Means Not Having to Say You're Bananas"	Leslie H. Martinson	Ron Friedman	October 16, 1973
A gorilla that has escaped from a traveling circus invades the camp and captures Betsy. Dusty, Andy, and Mr. Callahan try to think of some way to get her out of the cave the gorilla has put her in.
7	"Then There Were Seven"	Oscar Rudolph	Larry Rhine, Al Schwartz	October 23, 1973
Andy and Betsy are tricked into giving medical aid to a wounded outlaw, which results in the entire group being held hostage while they try to surgically remove a bullet.
8	"Tomahawk Territory"	Jack Arnold	Elroy Schwartz, Sherwood Schwartz	October 30, 1973
After rescuing a young Indian brave from a bear and finding out he's the Chief's son, the group hopes to trade being Good Samaritans for safe passage through Hackamaw territory, but instead the Hackamaws go on the warpath and kidnap Betsy.
9	"Two of a Kind"	Unknown	Unknown	November 6, 1973
Seeing a "Wanted" poster with a bearded outlaw who looks just like Callahan, the travelers wonder if he has been hiding a checkered past.
10	"Half Moon"	Earl Bellamy	Austin Kalish, Irma Kalish	November 13, 1973
Seeing Dusty's birthmark, an Indian chief thinks Dusty is his long-lost son and kidnaps him to resume life with the Indians.
11	"Here Come the Brides, There Go the Grooms"	Russ Mayberry	Bill Freedman, Ben Gershman	November 20, 1973
Two hillbillies kidnap Dusty and Callahan to become husbands for their ugly sisters in a double-barreled shotgun wedding.
12	"Danger Stranger"	Bruce Bilson	Bruce Howard	November 27, 1973
While trying to find a pass through the mountains, the wagoners bump into a murderous outlaw who is on the run.
13	"The Magician"	Bruce Bilson	John Fenton Murray	December 4, 1973
The group encounters a traveling magician who keeps them amused with his tricks while his assistant steals all their valuables.
14	"Androcles and the Bear"	John Florea	John Fenton Murray	December 11, 1973
A grizzly bear follows Dusty back to camp after he pulls a thorn from its foot, but the others drive it away, right into the path of some hunters.
15	"My Fair Callahan"	Bruce Bilson	Bruce Howard	December 18, 1973
When they rescue a young woman of high social standing who was lost on the trail, Callahan falls in love with her and tries to transform himself into a gentleman.
16	"Brookhaven U.S.A."	Richard Michaels	Bruce Howard, Marc Mandel, Elroy Schwartz	December 25, 1973
When Dusty and the gang stumble upon an apparent ghost town, Mr. Brookhaven decides to rename it and turn it into a real town again.
17	"How Dry Was My Valley"	Unknown	Unknown	January 1, 1974
When the group's supply of fresh water runs out, they hope a crackpot professor will be able to make it rain.
18	"The Wizard of Ooze"	Bruce Bilson	Skip Webster	January 8, 1974
Dusty learns that the wagon train is parked on a volcano, but on the way to warn the others he hits his head and gets amnesia.
19	"Phony Express"	Robert Jones	Howard Ostroff	January 15, 1974
A wounded soldier clamps a pouch onto Dusty's wrist, tells him to deliver it to Ford Hood, and to protect it with his life. Bad guy Bates shows up at the camp demanding the pouch, but it's empty. Everyone makes up a story of how they stole the contents to keep Bates from shooting them.
20	"Nothing to Crow About"	Russ Mayberry	Rick Mittleman	January 22, 1974
With a terrible storm approaching, the travelers try to find the map to a hidden canyon where they'll be safe, but it has gone missing, as have several other valuable items around camp. Dusty is suspected of being a kleptomaniac.
21	"From Here to Maternity"	Earl Bellamy	Unknown	February 5, 1974
Encountering a pregnant Indian woman, Callahan tries using smoke signals to contact her husband, but he's a member of an enemy tribe, and the smoke signals bring her angry father.
22	"Witch's Trail"	Bruce Bilson	Gene Thompson	February 12, 1974
Dusty and Callahan find a girl on the trail and bring her back to camp, but when strange things start to happen they think she must be a witch.
23	"The Cavalry Is Coming"	Richard Michaels	Austin Kalish, Irma Kalish	February 19, 1974
A Cavalry officer arrives, claiming that Andy is a deserter who stole an army payroll. After he arrests Andy, Dusty, and Callahan, who is left to save them?
24	"John J. Callahan"	John Florea	Rick Mittleman	February 26, 1974
Callahan will win $500 in a boxing match if he can last 5 minutes against the Champ. But the Champ has kidnapped Mrs. Brookhaven.
25	"Day at the Races"	Unknown	Unknown	March 5, 1974
The wagoners are forced into a horse race to win safe passage through Indian territory.
26	"Pechango Berries"	Unknown	Unknown	March 12, 1974
Dusty comes back to camp after eating some berries and is suddenly changed from an incompetent bumbler to someone brimming with easy confidence. The trouble is, the berries are also going to kill him.

=== Theatrical film ===
Four episodes of the series were edited together into a theatrical film, The Wackiest Wagon Train in the West, and released in movie theaters in August 1976. In order the four episodes are:

- "Tomahawk Territory" (ep. 8)
- "Horse of Another Color" (ep. 3)
- "There Is Nothing Like a Dame" (ep. 2)
- "The Not So Magnificent Seven" (ep. 1)

== Reception and cancellation ==
The show was created for Denver by Sherwood Schwartz, who had also created its progenitor, Gilligan's Island. (At the time, Schwartz had been actively trying to get Gilligan's Island revived for several years; after Dusty's Trail ended, Schwartz conceded to an animated Gilligan adaptation that debuted in fall 1974.) Jeannine Riley and Lori Saunders were both former cast members of Petticoat Junction, while Forrest Tucker had previously played a crusty Old West character in F Troop. According to U.S. television researchers Tim Brooks and Earle Marsh, the reason for the show's failure was that it was too obviously a rewrite of Gilligan's Island, deeming it "a derivative flop".

Denver professed on several occasions that Dusty's Trail was his favorite show to perform:

"At that time I still had some animus at how CBS threw us in the dumper. Herb Edelman and I'd done The Good Guys – but sour critics said it should have been just called 'Guys'. Gilligan repeats were on the tube more than Cronkite, and its royalties about kaput. I told myself to just enjoy the ride, and if it (Dusty's Trail) hit paydirt, super, if not, then it wasn't in the cards. It was my best year in front of a camera."

During its run in the 1973–1974 season, it was reported Dusty's Trail barely made the top 50 shows, a fairly respectable showing for a first-run syndicated program; nonetheless the program was canceled after its lone season, with 26 episodes produced out of an originally planned 30.

== Observations ==
Each of the seven main characters is derivative of those of Gilligan's Island, a previous series that had been created by Sherwood Schwartz, who had been trying unsuccessfully to sell a Gilligan's Island revival for several years (and eventually succeeded, in animated form, with The New Adventures of Gilligan in 1974).

- Dusty was based on Bob Denver's Gilligan's Island character, Gilligan.
- Tucker's role as the wagonmaster was based on The Skipper, originally played by Alan Hale Jr.
- The millionaire Brookhavens (Ivor Francis and Lynn Wood) were essentially the same characters as the Howells (Jim Backus and Natalie Schafer) from Gilligan's Island.
- Music hall singer Lulu (Jeannine Riley) was an adaptation of Ginger Grant, the movie star played by Tina Louise
- Girl-next-door Betsy (Lori Saunders) replaced farm-girl Mary Ann Summers (Dawn Wells)
- Andy (William Cort) filled the role of the savant Professor (Russell Johnson)

Other elements of the series are reproduced/recycled:

- The Gilligan's Island shipwreck, following what was meant to be a "three hour tour," is now replaced with a wagon being lost in the wilderness after being separated from the wagon train.
- The main mission of the plot was to reunite with the main wagon train, mirroring the castaways' attempt at rescue.
- Head hunters are now replaced by American Indians, who bear resemblance to the Hekawi, a fictional tribe from Forrest Tucker's previous series, F Troop.
- Criminals were encountered in both series; with Dusty's Trail being bandits and desperados, and occasionally marooned felons would end up on Gillian's Island.

== Home media ==
Several Dusty's Trail episodes, for reasons not entirely clear, were not properly copyrighted; these were among some of the last episodes of a regular TV series (in order of production) to lapse into the public domain, and some of the few to do so that were produced after 1963. Because of this, the show became widely available in reruns and on discount DVDs.

On October 12, 2004, Brentwood Home Video released 17 episodes of the series on Region 1 DVD in the United States.

== Legacy ==
The shows opening theme song appears as an easter egg in the video game Phasmophobia. It was included as part of an update that added the "Nell's Diner" map, and can be found by turning on the television in the main dining area.
