= The Invisible Woman (1983 film) =

1983 television film directed by Alan J. Levi

- Title card from advertisement
- Genre: Comedy; Science fiction
- Written by: Lloyd J. Schwartz; Sherwood Schwartz
- Directed by: Alan J. Levi
- Starring: Alexa Hamilton; Bob Denver; Harvey Korman; Garrett Morris
- Music by: David Frank
- Country of origin: United States
- Original language: English

Production
- Executive producers: Lloyd J. Schwartz; Sherwood Schwartz
- Producer: Alan J. Levi
- Cinematography: Dean Cundey
- Editor: Houseley Stevenson Jr.
- Running time: 100 minutes
- Production company: Redwood Productions

Original release
- Network: NBC
- Release: February 13, 1983

The Invisible Woman is a 1983 made-for-television science fiction comedy film starring Alexa Hamilton as Sandy Martinson, the titular character, and Bob Denver as her scientist uncle, Dr. Dudley Plunkett. The film first aired on NBC on Sunday, February 13, 1983.

== Plot ==
Dr. Dudley Plunkett, a scientist, is experimenting with numerous containers of colored chemicals in his laboratory at the Universal Biochemical Institute in Washington D.C. He has two chimpanzees in cages, Chuck and Yvette. Chuck reaches through the bars of his cage and mixes some chemicals together, accidentally producing a formula which turns him invisible after he touches it. Plunkett phones his niece, Sandy Martinson, a newspaper reporter who is working on a story about stolen art. He invites her to the lab, telling her that a story about the invisible chimpanzee could be her first byline. After Sandy arrives, Chuck spills the invisibility formula. While wiping it up, Sandy inadvertently exposes herself to the liquid which causes her body to become invisible. She removes all her clothes to confirm that she is completely invisible without them. Sandy is distraught and tells her uncle that her life is now ruined.

Dr. Plunkett figures out that Sandy can appear passably visible again by using makeup, a wig and sunglasses. This enables Sandy to return to work. Her editor Neil Gillmore assigns her to investigate another art gallery theft. She decides to go nude so that she can use invisibility as an advantage in investigating the crime. She finds a key on the floor of the art gallery vault which leads her to a health club. There she is able to spy on the art thieves in a steam room. She finds out that wealthy philanthropist Carlisle Edwards is the mastermind behind the thefts and that he has instructed his two henchmen to steal Cleopatra's scepter next. The scepter is worth millions of dollars and is also known as "the curse of the Nile." A superstition says that it will bring death to whoever owns it. The thieves notice an outline of steam around Sandy as she watches them and try to pursue her, but she escapes.

Meanwhile, Dr. Plunkett observes that Chuck has become visible again after the invisibility formula had apparently worn off. Plunkett calculates based on time and weight that Sandy will become visible again in a matter of hours. He plans to reveal the invisibility formula to his superior at the institute, Dr. Farrington, by inviting the board of governors to a meeting in his lab with Sandy there at the moment she is due to reappear. At the meeting, however, Plunkett is told that Chuck's seemingly empty cage had been replaced the day before with one that had a different chimpanzee inside. He suddenly realizes that Chuck had not really become visible again. Sandy hides and Plunkett is forced to admit to Farrington that he has no evidence for his claims about the invisibility formula. After Farrington admonishes him and leaves, Sandy tells her uncle she decided to keep her invisibility a secret so she could use it to aid in her job as a reporter.

Sandy informs the police about the planned theft but they are not convinced. She decides to go to the museum herself to try to stop the crime. Dr. Plunkett insists on coming along. Sandy sneaks inside, naked and invisible, finds the two thieves and scares them by pretending to be the curse of Cleopatra. As the criminals start to run away, they accidentally knock her into a sarcophagus that closes and traps her inside. Plunkett runs into the building and frees her but in the confusion the thieves are able to grab the scepter and run towards the exit. A security guard catches them, giving Sandy time to apply her makeup and appear visible again. The thieves escape from the guard, kidnap Sandy and use her as a hostage to fend off the police, who have just arrived. The thieves force Sandy to drive their getaway car and the police chase after them in their vehicles. While the thieves are in the back of the car shooting at the police, Sandy removes her makeup to become invisible and pretends to be Cleopatra again. She tells the men they have to throw away their weapons and give up committing crimes before she will lift the curse, which they agree to do. She drives them to the police station where they are arrested and the scepter is secured. They confess to their crimes and name Carlisle Edwards as their accomplice, who is also brought in and arrested.

Back at Dr. Plunkett's home, Sandy shows off her front-page story in today's newspaper to her uncle, headlined "Museum Robbery Foiled." Plunkett then opens his mail to find a letter from Dr. Farrington notifying him that he's been fired from his job at the institute. He tells Sandy that without that job, he won't be able to research how to make her visible again. Sandy feels responsible because she didn't allow Plunkett to reveal her invisibility to Farrington earlier. She accompanies Plunkett to the Institute where they interrupt a board meeting led by Farrington. Sandy, in invisible form, performs a series of pranks on the board members that they can't explain scientifically, which convinces Farrington to give Plunkett his job back. Sandy and Plunkett are then at the newspaper offices celebrating Sandy's front-page story with the rest of the staff. Gillmore arrives with a competitor's newspaper, points out the headline "'Invisible Woman' Foils Robbery" and asks Sandy why she didn't see the "invisible woman." Plunkett tells him that it's very difficult to see an invisible woman after which he and Sandy raise their glasses together in a toast.

== Cast ==
- Alexa Hamilton as Sandy Martinson
- Bob Denver as Dr. Dudley Plunkett
- Harvey Korman as Carlisle Edwards
- Jonathan Banks as Darren
- Art LaFleur as Phil
- David Doyle as Neil Gillmore
- Ron Palillo as "Spike" Mitchell
- Richard Sanders as Orville
- Jack Bruno Tate as Lieutenant Dan Williams
- Garrett Morris as Lieutenant Greg Larkin
- George Gobel as Dr. Farrington
- Anne Haney as Mrs. Van Dam
- Mel Stewart as Security Guard
- Scott Nemes as Rodney Sherman
- Jake Steinfeld as Attendant
- Ken Sansom as Lionel Gilbert
- Teri Beckerman as The Receptionist
- Ronald E. Morgan as Police #1
- Joseph Phelan as Police #2
- Dan Woren as Gallery Guard
- Marsha Warner as Saleslady
- Clinton Chase as Officer
- David Whitfield as Marvin Carter
- Valerie Hall as Miss Tomkins

== Production ==
This was the last of several television comedy productions worked on by both producer Sherwood Schwartz and actor Bob Denver, who first collaborated on Gilligan's Island.

The movie's invisibility special effects were achieved through the chroma key process. Alexa Hamilton was completely covered in a blue body stocking, mittens and hood and performed her "invisibility" scenes away from the other actors in a room that was colored with matching blue. UPI reporter Vernon Scott called the effects "convincing, the best special effects involving invisibility ever attempted on screen." The film's special effects were done by Alan Hall who later won two Oscars for his effects work in feature films. Cinematographer Dean Cundey went on to work on multiple films for directors Robert Zemeckis and Steven Spielberg and receive an Oscar nomination for Who Framed Roger Rabbit.

Lloyd Schwartz said he joined ASCAP for co-writing the theme song's only lyric, "She must be around here someplace."

== Release ==
The film aired on February 13, 1983, opposite the final installment of the ABC mini-series The Winds of War. It received a 16.6 rating and a 22 share. This rating was lower than the average for any of the top 30 shows for the 1982-83 television season, although NBC only had four shows in the top 30. The movie was intended as a pilot for a weekly series but it was not picked up. Working or alternate titles for the film include Out of Sight and Portrait of an Invisible Woman.
