= Margaret (2011 film) =

- Theatrical release poster
- Directed by: Kenneth Lonergan
- Written by: Kenneth Lonergan
- Produced by: Sydney Pollack; Gary Gilbert; Scott Rudin
- Starring: Anna Paquin; J. Smith-Cameron; Jean Reno; Allison Janney; Matthew Broderick; Mark Ruffalo; Matt Damon; Jeannie Berlin; Kieran Culkin
- Cinematography: Ryszard Lenczewski
- Edited by: Anne McCabe; Michael Fay
- Music by: Nico Muhly
- Production companies: Camelot Pictures; Gilbert Films; Mirage Enterprises; Scott Rudin Productions
- Distributed by: Fox Searchlight Pictures
- Release date: September 30, 2011
- Running time: 150 minutes 186 minutes (Extended cut)
- Country: United States
- Language: English
- Budget: $14 million
- Box office: $623,292

Margaret (/ˌmɑːrɡəˈrɛt/ mar-gə-ret) is a 2011 American psychological drama film written and directed by Kenneth Lonergan. The film stars Anna Paquin, Jean Reno, Mark Ruffalo, J. Smith-Cameron, Jeannie Berlin, Allison Janney, Matt Damon, and Matthew Broderick. Margaret was filmed in 2005 and originally scheduled for release that year by Fox Searchlight Pictures, but was repeatedly delayed while Lonergan struggled to create a final cut he was satisfied with, resulting in multiple lawsuits. The litigation ended in 2014.

Although the studio insisted on a maximum 150-minute runtime, Lonergan's preferred version of Margaret was closer to three hours. Martin Scorsese and Thelma Schoonmaker contributed to editing a 165-minute version that Lonergan approved, but it was never released due to producer Gary Gilbert's refusal. Ultimately, Fox Searchlight Pictures released the 150-minute version in a limited U.S. release on September 30, 2011, to moderately positive reviews from critics. While some found it overlong, it appeared on several best-of-the-year lists. Lonergan completed a three-hour extended version with additional footage, a revised score and sound mix, which was released on DVD in July 2012. Critical praise has grown over time, and Margaret is now regarded as one of the 21st century's best films, ranking 31st in a BBC critics poll.

The film's title is derived from Gerard Manley Hopkins's poem "Spring and Fall: To a Young Child", which is analyzed in Lisa's English class. In the poem, the narrator addresses a young girl named Margaret, who mourns the falling autumn leaves as if they were deceased friends. The narrator informs Margaret that this sense of grief, though it feels profound, is an inescapable part of the human condition.

== Plot ==
A 17-year-old Manhattan student, Lisa Cohen, shopping on the Upper West Side, interacts with bus driver Gerald Maretti as she runs alongside his moving bus; he allows himself to become distracted, leading him to fatally strike a pedestrian, Monica Patterson, who subsequently dies in Lisa's arms. Initially, Lisa reports to the police that the driver had a green traffic signal, but later, out of remorse, changes her story.

Lisa has a rocky relationship with her mother Joan, an actress who has recently found success starring in a play. They fight sporadically and Lisa is ambivalent toward Joan's success in theater and her new boyfriend Ramon. Meanwhile, Lisa is in a back-and-forth discussion with her father over an upcoming trip to his home. Lisa's life takes various turns: she involves herself in various vehement debates with classmates about politics and terrorism, decides to lose her virginity to her classmate, Paul, and flirts with her math teacher, Mr. Caije, which later results in them having sex. Much later, she tells him, in the presence of another teacher, that she had an abortion and was not sure who the father was, mentioning there were several possibilities.

Lisa confronts Maretti at his home. He pretends to have forgotten the details of the accident, but later reveals to her in anger that he does remember them, but believes he did nothing wrong. Lisa decides to pursue his firing with passion. Alongside Monica's best friend, Emily, and cousin, Abigail, Lisa ultimately becomes involved in a wrongful death lawsuit against the Metropolitan Transit Authority, seeking the dismissal of Maretti, who has caused two previous accidents, as well as monetary damages, which would be awarded to Abigail as Monica's next of kin.

Lisa and Emily become close, though the friendship is rocky, especially when they later have an argument where Emily accuses Lisa of using the situation to add drama to her life. Lisa, Joan, Emily, and Ramon attend an after show dinner, which ends with Ramon making a remark that Emily perceives as antisemitic. Joan and Ramon have a minor falling out and Ramon dies of a heart attack sometime after.

The lawsuit reaches a conclusion, with an award of $350,000, but the MTA refuses to fire Maretti, out of concern that it would inflame a labor dispute. Abigail claims the settlement offer, revealing the monetary settlement to have been her primary motivation; Lisa becomes very upset and emotionally confesses that she sees herself as Monica's killer.

Lisa and Joan attend an opera that Joan was to see with Ramon before his death. On the way, Lisa sees Maretti driving the same bus that had killed Monica and there is a brief moment where the two see each other. During the opera performance, Lisa begins crying and she and her mother affectionately reconnect, crying together and holding each other as the opera goes on.

== Cast ==
- Anna Paquin as Lisa Cohen
- J. Smith-Cameron as Joan Cohen
- Jean Reno as Ramon Cameron
- Jeannie Berlin as Emily Smith
- Allison Janney as Monica Patterson
- Matthew Broderick as John Andrew Van Tassel
- Kieran Culkin as Paul Hirsch
- Mark Ruffalo as Gerald Maretti
- Matt Damon as Aaron Caije
- Sarah Steele as Becky
- John Gallagher, Jr. as Darren Rodifer
- Stephen Adly Guirgis as Mitchell
- Betsy Aidem as Abigail
- Adam Rose as Anthony
- Jonathan Hadary as Deutsch
- Brittany Underwood as Leslie
- T. Scott Cunningham as Gary
- Josh Hamilton as Victor
- Rosemarie DeWitt as Mrs. Maretti
- Olivia Thirlby as Monica Sloane
- Kenneth Lonergan as Karl
- Michael Ealy as Dave the Lawyer
- Adam LeFevre as Rob
- Krysten Ritter as Salesgirl
- Matthew Bush as Kurt

== Production ==
Filmed in 2005, the film's lengthy post-production sparked multiple lawsuits, which were scheduled to be tried in 2009. In July 2010, Fox Searchlight stated that Lonergan finally completed work on the film, and that it would be released in 2011.

In an interview with The Guardian, Lonergan explained that Martin Scorsese intervened during a deadlock in the editing process. The theatrical release was based on a version submitted to Fox Searchlight in 2008 or 2009, which Lonergan found unsatisfactory. He continued to work on his own version and suggested involving Scorsese to finalize the film collaboratively. Scorsese saw Lonergan's original cut of the film and declared it a masterpiece before enlisting editor Thelma Schoonmaker to create a final version of the film. Fox Searchlight insisted on a two-and-a-half-hour runtime, which both Lonergan and the studio struggled to achieve satisfactorily. With Scorsese's support, they produced a cut that was 12 minutes longer, but it was not approved by producer Gary Gilbert. Consequently, the shorter version was theatrically released. Lonergan emphasized that the perceived length of a film is more important than its actual runtime, aiming to achieve the fullest realization of the film possible. He added that his approach to storytelling in the film aimed for a naturalistic rhythm that feels like real life, emphasizing the necessity of this method for a story about a teenager learning that the world doesn't revolve around her. Attempts to shorten the film to meet the required runtime compromised its integrity. He acknowledged that while he met his contractual obligations with a two-and-a-half-hour theatrical version, he was never fully satisfied with it. Legal issues prevented him from expressing his discontent publicly during the film's release. He advocated for the extended edition, which he felt better represented his vision despite some technical flaws he hoped to fix in the future.

== Soundtrack ==
Original music was composed by Nico Muhly with additional cues by Elliott Carter. The film also features two scenes at the Metropolitan Opera, featuring "Casta diva" from Bellini's Norma, and "Belle nuit, ô nuit d'amour" (Barcarolle) from Jacques Offenbach's Les contes d'Hoffmann.

== Reception ==
=== Critical response ===
Margaret has a 75% rating on Rotten Tomatoes, based on 102 reviews, with an average rating of 7.2 out of 10. The critical consensus states, "A surfeit of ideas contributes to Margaret's excessive run time, but Anna Paquin does an admirable job of guiding viewers through emotional hell." The film also holds a score of 61 out of 100 on Metacritic (based on 27 critics), indicating "generally favorable" reviews.

For her role as Lisa, Paquin shared the 2011 Best Actress Award from the London Film Critics Circle and received a nomination for Best Actress from the Chicago Film Critics Association. She placed first in critics' polls from the LA Weekly, the Village Voice, and the International Cinephile Society. On December 23, 2011, Fox Searchlight sent screeners of the film to AMPAS members.

Margaret earned five-star reviews from Time Out, The Daily Telegraph, and The Guardian. It then ranked 31st in a 2016 BBC poll of the 21st century's greatest films. In 2019, critic Richard Brody named it one of the 27 best movies of the decade. It continues to be considered a masterpiece by multiple publications.

Some critics have cited the film as an example of a great New York City movie and a portrait of a traumatized Manhattan in the wake of 9/11.

=== Box office ===
Despite being well received critically, Margaret was given a limited release in North America in 14 theaters and earned $46,495. In the UK, it debuted on only one screen in one cinema – Odeon Panton Street in London. Such was the interest in the film that it took £4,595 in its opening weekend, giving it by some margin the highest screen average of any film on release at the time. In France, it was shown on only one screen in one cinema – Publicis Champs Elysées in Paris. The worldwide total for the film was $623,292.

== Home media ==
An extended cut of the film was released on DVD in July 2012 in both the UK and the US. The US release also includes a Blu-ray of the film featuring the theatrical cut in high definition.
