= Sheila Levine Is Dead and Living in New York =

- Movie Poster
- Directed by: Sidney J. Furie
- Screenplay by: Kenny Solms; Gail Parent
- Based on: Sheila Levine Is Dead and Living in New York; 1972 novel by Gail Parent
- Produced by: Harry Korshak
- Starring: Roy Scheider; Jeannie Berlin; Rebecca Dianna Smith
- Cinematography: Donald M. Morgan
- Edited by: Argyle Nelson Jr.
- Music by: Michel Legrand
- Distributed by: Paramount Pictures
- Release date: 12 February 1975 (St. Louis)
- Running time: 113 minutes
- Country: United States
- Language: English
- Budget: $1 million

Sheila Levine Is Dead and Living in New York is a 1975 black comedy film directed by Sidney J. Furie starring Jeannie Berlin and Roy Scheider about a shy young woman who moves to New York City and falls in love with the boyfriend of her extroverted roommate. The film was co-written by Kenny Solms and Gail Parent, adapted from Parent's 1972 novel of the same name. The film was shot on location in New York City.

== Plot ==
Painfully shy Sheila Levine relocates from Pennsylvania to New York City against the wishes of her parents, who want her to get married. Sheila moves in with Kate, a sexy, extroverted aspiring actress with a busy social life. At Kate's suggestion, Sheila visits a nightclub, where she meets Sam, a bachelor doctor who persuades the naive Sheila to spend the night with him. Sheila has the first good sex of her life with Sam, but when she expresses romantic feelings for him, he lets her know he considers their encounter just a one-night stand, "satisfying an urge". Sheila leaves his apartment upset, saying she never wants to see him again.

Some time later, Sheila and Sam meet again when he arrives at her apartment to take Kate on a blind date. Sheila and Sam find they are still attracted to each other, but when Kate appears, she easily lures Sam's attention away from Sheila. To Sheila's chagrin, Kate and Sam begin a steady relationship. When Sheila's younger sister marries, Sheila moves back to her parents' home in Pennsylvania, planning to stay, but she quickly realizes she no longer fits in there and misses Sam, who by now is living with Kate. Sheila returns to New York City and tries to win Sam back, only to find that Sam and Kate are engaged and that Kate is pregnant. Kate later tells Sheila that Sam is only marrying her because he thinks the baby is his, but it is actually another man's child, and Kate plans to have a secret abortion after she and Sam are married. Sheila remains in New York and concentrates on her new career as a producer of children's records. Sam eventually faces the fact that he loves Sheila, not Kate, and he and Kate break up. Sam proposes to Sheila; the film ends before she gives him her answer.

== Cast ==
Actor	Role
Jeannie Berlin	Sheila Levine
Roy Scheider	Sam Stoneman
Rebecca Dianna Smith	Kate
Janet Brandt	Bernice
Sid Melton	Mannie
Charles Woolf	Wally
Leda Rogers	Agatha
Jack Bernardi	Uncle Herm

== Critical reception ==
Vincent Canby of The New York Times did not care for the film, although he liked the novel on which the film was based.

Something disastrous happened to the heroine of Gail Parent's funny novel, Sheila Levine Is Dead and Living in New York, on her way to the silver screen... This Sheila is so aggressively naive and dumb, when it suits the purposes of the comedy, that it's quite impossible to believe that even her family could stand her, to say nothing of the Mr. Right with whom the film provides her.

Arthur D. Murphy of Variety wrote "Substantially different from Gail Parent's book of the same title, the film version of Sheila Levine Is Dead and Living in New York is a very appealing romantic drama with comedy ... Jeannie Berlin's title role performance is outstanding, and Roy Scheider's excellent performance as her reluctant lover is a major career milestone." Gene Siskel of the Chicago Tribune gave the film three stars out of four and called it "a surprisingly warm and funny tale," with a protagonist "who is someone special. Most movie women, and most movie men for that matter, know exactly what they want to do or what they feel at any given moment in the film. The source of their knowledge is that their lives have been scripted and that the actors involved can't breathe unpredictability into predictable responses. In the final analysis, it is the unpredictability of its lead characters that makes 'Sheila Levine' intriguing." Gary Arnold of The Washington Post wrote of the adaptation from page to screen that "it's difficult to understand why the material was transformed into romantic idiocy. Hollow as it sounded, the original jokey tone was far preferable to this humorless sentimentality." Pauline Kael of The New Yorker declared "A confused, part-liberated rehash of old Hollywood attitudes toward the young girl working in the big city, Sheila Levine isn't much of a movie." Despite an advertising campaign featuring a poster with the quote "Jeannie Berlin triumphs!" as attributed to critic Leonard Maltin, the film was given a BOMB rating in his Movie Guide, with him saying "Dead is right."

On Rotten Tomatoes, the film holds a rating of 33% from 42 reviews. The consensus summarizes: "Sheila Levine Is Dead and Living in New York is a tonally confused adaptation that drains the novel's sharp edge into a half-hearted romantic fantasy."

== Soundtrack ==
- "Love Me or Love People" - Composed by Michel Legrand

== See also ==
- List of American films of 1975
