= Bone (film) =

1972 American film directed by Larry Cohen

- DVD cover
- Directed by: Larry Cohen
- Written by: Larry Cohen
- Produced by: Larry Cohen
- Starring: Yaphet Kotto; Andrew Duggan; Joyce Van Patten; Jeannie Berlin
- Cinematography: George Folsey
- Edited by: Michael Corey; George Folsey Jr.
- Music by: Gil Melle
- Production company: Larco Productions
- Distributed by: New World Pictures
- Release date: July 1972 (Hollywood)
- Running time: 95 minutes
- Country: United States
- Language: English

Bone is a 1972 American black comedy crime film written, produced, and directed by Larry Cohen in his directorial debut. It stars Yaphet Kotto, Joyce Van Patten, and Andrew Duggan. The film tells the story of a home invasion perpetrated by Kotto's character, who soon realizes that his victims are less wealthy and far unhappier than they initially appeared.

== Plot ==
Bernadette and Bill are a bickering couple from Beverly Hills. One day, a stranger wanders onto their property and they mistake him for an exterminator. The man, who calls himself Bone, takes the couple hostage, intending to rob them.

Bone discovers that his captives are not as wealthy as they seem. Nevertheless, he forces Bill, a car dealer, to go to a bank to get some money, threatening to rape or kill Bernadette otherwise.

Bill leaves, but at the bank he is distracted by a young girl in line. She ends up seducing him as Bill contemplates how little love there has been in his marriage. He does not return home with the money, but a nearly naked Bernadette, after having too many drinks, seduces Bone on the sofa.

Bernadette then persuades Bone they should murder her husband for his insurance. Bill tries to flee, but they follow him and, at a beach, Bernadette smothers him to death in the sand. She turns to find Bone, only to discover he has disappeared.

== Cast ==
- Yaphet Kotto as "Bone"
- Joyce Van Patten as Bernadette
- Andrew Duggan as Bill
- Jeannie Berlin as Girl
- Brett Somers as X-Ray Lady

Larry Cohen said in an interview that he first considered Paul Winfield for the part of Bone, but found him "too genteel." He then saw Yaphet Kotto in William Wyler's The Liberation of L.B. Jones (1970) and cast him instead.

The film includes a brief appearance by Ida Berlin, grandmother of Jeannie Berlin and mother of actress, comedian, writer and director Elaine May.

== Production ==
Filming started in July 1971 under the title Unreal.

Alternate titles for Bone include "Housewife," "Beverly Hills Nightmare," and "Dial Rat for Terror."

== Reception ==
On the review aggregator website Rotten Tomatoes, 57% of 7 critics' reviews are positive, with an average rating of 6.6/10.

== Theme ==
Larry Cohen explained the theme of the movie in a 2019 interview:

"it deals with problems we still face today in America. The film is revolutionary because it cuts to the heart of racial prejudice. And some of that is indeed sexual, where the white man has a fear of the black man’s sexuality. It’s a thorn in the side of the white community. They’re still afraid of black people. In many cities white people will cross the street when they see black people coming."

== See also ==
- List of films featuring home invasions
