= Big John, Little John =

1976 American TV series

- Big John (Herb Edelman), from the opening credits
- Genre: Sitcom
- Created by: Sherwood Schwartz
- Starring: Herb Edelman; Robbie Rist; Joyce Bulifant
- Theme music composer: Richard LaSalle
- Country of origin: United States
- Original language: English
- No. of seasons: 1
- No. of episodes: 13

Production
- Executive producers: Raymond S. "Ray" "R. S." Allen; William P. D'Angelo; Harvey Bullock; Sherwood Schwartz
- Producer: Lloyd J. Schwartz
- Running time: 22–24 minutes
- Production companies: D'Angelo-Bullock-Allen Productions; Redwood Productions; Viacom

Original release
- Network: NBC
- Release: September 11 – December 4, 1976

Big John, Little John is an American Saturday-morning sitcom, produced by Sherwood Schwartz, which starred Herb Edelman as "Big John" and Robbie Rist as "Little John". The show first aired on September 11, 1976 on NBC, and ran for one season of 13 episodes. The series was produced by Redwood Productions in association with D'Angelo-Bullock-Allen Productions. In the United Kingdom, it was shown on BBC One.

== Plot summary ==
Little John (Robbie Rist), as seen in the opening credits.

The show's main character was a forty-year-old middle school science teacher named John Martin (played by Edelman). While vacationing in Florida, he drinks from a spring which turns out to be the legendary Fountain of Youth sought by Juan Ponce de León. The water changes him into a twelve-year-old boy (played by Rist), and back again.

The changes occur spontaneously and without warning. Because Martin only sipped the water, the changes are recurring and not permanent; according to legend, had he taken a full drink, he would be age twelve permanently. Only his wife, Marjorie (Joyce Bulifant), and son, Ricky (Mike Darnell), know his secret, though Martin's students (who befriend him as "Little John") and his boss, principal Bertha Bottomly (Olive Dunbar), do become suspicious that something unusual is going on. The Martin family explain the younger John as their nephew, staying with them. Throughout the series, "Big John" unsuccessfully tries to find a cure for his predicament, but his experiences as "Little John" often give him insight into what his students are facing.

To make the two actors resemble each other more closely, Rist's blond hair was dyed brown, while Edelman wore a hairpiece that partially covered his baldness, though was absent during the credits sequences. Edelman and Rist appeared together in 1977, on the Jerry Lewis MDA Telethon.

== Cast ==
- Herb Edelman - Big John Martin
- Robbie Rist - Little John Martin
- Joyce Bulifant - Marjorie Martin
- Mike Darnell - Ricky Martin
- Olive Dunbar - Bertha Bottomly
- Kristoff St. John - Homer
- Cari Anne Warder - Valerie
- Stephen H. Cassidy - Stanley

Rist had previously worked on Schwartz's The Brady Bunch during its final season (1973–1974), as the Bradys' cousin, Oliver.

== Episodes ==
No.	Title	Directed by	Written by	Original release date
1	"A Sizeable Problem"	Gordon Wiles	Lloyd J. Schwartz, Sherwood Schwartz	September 11, 1976
While on a trip to Florida, John Martin stumbles upon the legendary fountain of youth. Willing to test the waters, John sips a handful of the liquid. The consequences are unforeseeable, for he begins to revert to his childhood at certain times that are neither predictable nor controllable, causing many problematic situations for John and his family.
2	"Peter Panic"	Gordon Wiles	Philip Taylor	September 18, 1976
Big John is cast as Captain Hook in his school's production of Peter Pan, while Little John ends up having to play Peter Pan at the same time.
3	"Very Little John"	Wes Kenney	Bruce Kalish, Ron Sellz	September 25, 1976
John tries a new formula in the laboratory that he hopes will cure him from his conversions.
4	"The Great Escape"	Gordon Wiles	William Freedman, Albert A. Schwartz	October 2, 1976
John Martin is detained when a sheriff demands his ID and he cannot produce it. He gets his freedom when his personality changes in prison.
5	"Big Scare, Little Scare"	Gordon Wiles	Ron Friedman	October 9, 1976
John has summoned Mr. Boswell, Stanley’s dad, to account for his son’s continuous tardiness to class for five days. Boswell explains that the boy is afraid of crossing in front of the Crabtree mansion, an abandoned house that neighbors believe it to be haunted. John decides to find out who’s behind the Crabtree ghost. Guest stars: Don "Red" Barry (Mr. Crabtree), James Deuter (Mr. Boswell)
6	"Big Shot / Little Shot"	Ross Bowman	Alan Dinehart, Herbert Finn	October 16, 1976
It is vaccination day at the school and John turns into a man and he gets vaccinated. Meanwhile, as the kid, he's invited to join the school basketball team. Then at the end of the episode, he becomes the kid again and the other teachers take him to get vaccinated again, much to his chagrin.
7	"Time for Change"	Gordon Wiles	Lloyd J. Schwartz	October 23, 1976
John believes he has discovered the secret of the Fountain of Youth, so he calls a press conference to announce his discovery — but his "discovery" shows no signs of panning out as he had believed.
8	"The Principal Who Came to Dinner"	Wes Kenney	Mark Fink	October 30, 1976
Big John's voice in Little John's body and vice versa puts not only Martin in a squeeze but his family as well.
9	"Bully for You"	Gordon Wiles	Sam Locke, Paul Roberts	November 6, 1976
Stanley is again late for the class. The teacher is speaking to his students about the importance of facing up bullies. This leads to trouble for Little John when he's threatened by the class bully, Gasey.
10	"Off the Wall"	Gordon Wiles	Ben Gershman, Harry Winkler	November 13, 1976
John is assigned to find who is behind the vandalism inflicted on the school walls.
11	"The Missing John"	Gordon Wiles	Bruce Howard	November 20, 1976
Little John receives a severe reprimand for having played unwillingly a joke on the school principal.
12	"Speak for Yourself, John"	Gordon Wiles	David P. Harmon	November 27, 1976
Because of the arrangements for the annual Thanksgiving dance that is held at the school, Ms. Bottomly proposes to Professor Martin that he be one of the chaperones. At the same time, Little John is chosen by his female classmate as companion for that day.
13	"Abracadabra"	Norm Gray	Jerome Zucker, Davis Samuel Zucker, James S. Abrahams	December 4, 1976
In order to arrange a show for the school annual party, one of Martin's students prepares a set of different magic tricks.

== Home media ==
The complete series was released on DVD (for Regions 1 and 2) in 2009 by Fabulous Films.
