= The Wackiest Wagon Train in the West =

- Theatrical release poster
- Directed by: Jack Arnold; Earl Bellamy; Bruce Bilson; Oscar Rudolph
- Written by: Ron Friedman; Howard Ostroff; Brad Radnitz; Sherwood Schwartz; Elroy Schwartz
- Produced by: Elroy Schwartz
- Starring: Bob Denver; Forrest Tucker
- Cinematography: Alan Stensvold
- Edited by: Jack Woelz
- Distributed by: Danton Films
- Release date: August 1, 1976
- Running time: 86 mins.
- Country: United States
- Language: English

The Wackiest Wagon Train in the West is a 1976 American Western comedy film directed by Jack Arnold. The film stars Bob Denver as Dusty, the bumbling assistant to Wagonmaster Callahan featured in the syndicated series Dusty's Trail.

The film itself consists of four episodes of Dusty's Trail edited together: "Tomahawk Territory", "Horse of Another Color", "There Is Nothing Like a Dame", and "The Not So Magnificent Seven".

== Plot summary ==
A stagecoach and covered wagon heading west across the plains become separated from their wagon train thanks to Dusty, a bumbling assistant to Wagonmaster Callahan (Forrest Tucker). Lost in the wilderness, seven hapless souls must now make their way to California on their own using what brains they have or haven't got.

First, the characters meet Indians.

Then there is a "necktie party" looking to hang Dusty as a horse thief.

Third, a couple of cattle rustlers want to "get friendly" with some willing females.

And finally, a "shootout" takes place, with Dusty dressed up as Bat Masterson in a ghost town setting.

== Home media ==
The Wackiest Wagon Train in the West was released on VHS by JTC, Inc., Front Row Video, Inc. and Direct Source Special. The film has also been released on Region 1 DVD by numerous companies including Tango Entertainment, Digiview and St. Clair Vision. These releases by numerous budget labels were due to the fact that the copyrights on most episodes of Dusty's Trail were never properly claimed, making the series one of the last television series to enter the public domain before the Copyright Act of 1976 (and its much longer copyright terms) took effect. As the film was sourced from this series, the film itself is also in the public domain.

== Reception ==
”Only television cultists will find anything worth watching here”, commented TV Guide.
