= WGAG-LP =

Radio station in Princeton, West Virginia

- Princeton, West Virginia; United States
- Broadcast area: Princeton, West Virginia
- Frequency: 93.1 MHz
- Branding: Little Buddy Radio

Programming
- Format: Adult hits

Ownership
- Owner: The Denver Foundation, Inc.

History
- First air date: 2004

Technical information
- Licensing authority: FCC
- Facility ID: 134607
- Class: L1
- Power: 100 watts
- HAAT: −6 meters (−20 ft)
- Transmitter coordinates: 37°24′4.0″N 81°5′20.0″W

Links
- Public license information: LMS
- Website: WGAG-LP Online

WGAG-LP is a variety/adult hits formatted broadcast radio station licensed to and serving Princeton, West Virginia.

WGAG-LP is owned and operated by The Denver Foundation, Inc., founded by Bob Denver who played the title character on Gilligan's Island (the station is branded as "Little Buddy Radio", a reference to Gilligan's nickname).
