= The Good Guys (1968 TV series) =

1968 TV series

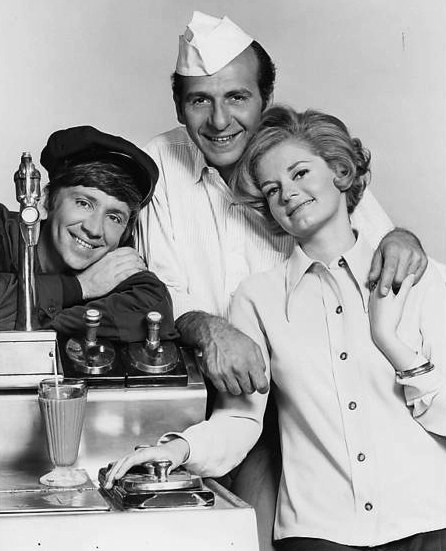
- From left: Bob Denver, Herb Edelman, Joyce Van Patten
- Genre: Sitcom
- Created by: Jack Rose
- Written by: Arnold Horwitt; Jack Rose; Mel Tolkin
- Directed by: Charles R. Rondeau
- Starring: Bob Denver; Herb Edelman; Joyce Van Patten; Jack Perkins
- Theme music composer: Ray Evans; Jerry Fielding; Jay Livingston
- Opening theme: "Two Good Guys"
- Composer: Jerry Fielding
- Country of origin: United States
- Original language: English
- No. of seasons: 2
- No. of episodes: 42

Production
- Executive producer: Leonard B. Stern
- Producers: Jerry Davis; Jack Rose; Bob Schiller; Bob Weiskopf
- Cinematography: William T. Cline; Robert Hoffman
- Camera setup: Multi-camera
- Running time: 24 minutes
- Production company: Talent Associates

Original release
- Network: CBS
- Release: September 25, 1968 – January 23, 1970

The Good Guys is an American sitcom that aired on CBS from September 25, 1968, to January 23, 1970. Forty-two color episodes were filmed. The program was produced by Talent Associates.

Although some episodes, including the pilot, have been posted online in color and black and white, the full series has never been released on home media or rebroadcast in decades, and a majority of the show has remained unseen since its original broadcast.

== Synopsis ==
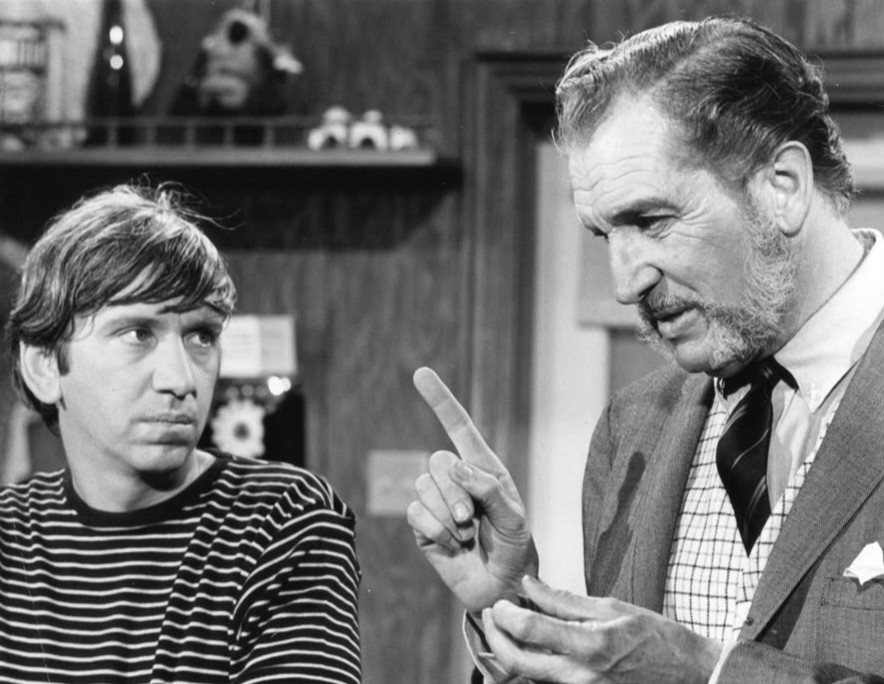
A health inspector (guest-star Vincent Price, right) tells Rufus (Bob Denver) to clean up the diner in the Season 2 episode "Fly in My Stew."

The main characters are Rufus Butterworth (Bob Denver), the driver of a customized 1924 Lincoln turned taxi, and his childhood friend Bert Gramus, played by Herb Edelman, owner of a local diner and neighborhood hangout called "Bert's Place", which Butterworth advertised on the taxi's fender-mount spare tire covers. Plots usually revolved around "get rich quick" schemes that invariably backfired. In the second season (1969–1970), Rufus gave up driving the cab and became a partner with Bert in the diner, which moved to a beach location. Other characters included Bert's schoolteacher wife, Claudia (Joyce Van Patten), and diner regulars Mr. Bender, Hal Dawson, and truck driver Big Tom (played by Denver's Gilligan's Island co-star Alan Hale Jr.).

Never a hit with viewers, The Good Guys failed to finish in the Nielsen Top 30 and was canceled during its second season.

== Production notes ==
Rufus's taxi was created by George Barris. A 1/25-scale model kit was manufactured by MPC Corporation and examples are highly collectable today.

The first several episodes of the first season were filmed before a live studio audience (unusual at the time), with an accompanying laugh track to sweeten the laughs during post-production. Due to production changes, the majority of Season One episodes and all of Season Two were filmed without a studio audience. Episodes were fitted with a laugh track afterwards.

Denver later recalled of the show's negative reception: "I still had some animus at how CBS threw us in the dumper. Herb Edelman and I'd done The Good Guys…but sour critics said it should have been just called 'Guys'."

== Syndication ==
The Good Guys has never been shown in reruns in the United States. In his autobiography, Gilligan, Maynard and Me, Bob Denver related that poor-quality prints of the show were shown for a time in South America. TV Land considered showing episodes of the show in 1998 but opted instead to air episodes of another "lost" sitcom that was also produced by Talent Associates, He & She.

== Episodes ==
=== Season 1 (1968–1969) ===
No. overall	No. in season	Title	Directed by	Written by	Original release date	Prod. code
1	1	"Keep the Home Fires Burning"	Unknown	Unknown	September 25, 1968	1642–0751
After purchasing insurance on the diner from a friend of his – a hapless insurance agent whose clients always seem to end up filing insurance claims – Bert buys a new grill for the diner. The grill promptly catches fire, and Bert soon finds himself under investigation for insurance fraud.
2	2	"Pie in the Sky"	Leonard B. Stern	Jack Rose	October 2, 1968	1642–0752
Bert and Rufus hire a company to make a television commercial for Bert's Place. During production, they argue, and Bert develops stage fright.
3	3	"Let 'Em Eat Rolls"	Leonard Stern	Jack Rose, Milt Rosen, Leonard Stern, Mel Tolkin	October 9, 1968	3605
The pilot episode for the series. Rufus convinces Bert that they should become the agents for a struggling musician. They approach Claudia’s former boyfriend, now a record executive, about getting the musician a recording contract, but to get him to agree, Bert has to convince him that Bert’s Place is part of a chain of successful restaurants. As part of the ruse, Bert places an order for 3,000 rolls, and after they are delivered, Bert and Rufus have to find a way to hide them all before Claudia finds out.
4	4	"A Man for Off-Season"	Unknown	Unknown	October 16, 1968	1642–0753
When Bert goes on a vacation in a cabin, Rufus joins him and drives him crazy.
5	5	"Bert's Rufus-in-Law"	Unknown	Unknown	October 23, 1968	1642–0755
Bert and Rufus have a falling out when Rufus falls for a waitress and Bert tries to keep them apart.
6	6	"Is This Trip Necessary?"	Unknown	Unknown	November 6, 1968	1642–0754
Bert accidentally causes Rufus to suffer an injury in a fall outside the diner, is forced to pay for a hospital stay in which Rufus is surrounded by attractive nurses, and allows Rufus to recuperate in the Gramus home.
7	7	"Nostradamus Rides Again"	Unknown	Unknown	November 13, 1968	1642–0756
Rufus believes that he has developed extrasensory perception and predicts that Bert does not have long to live.
8	8	"Credit Won't Buy You Happiness"	Unknown	Unknown	November 20, 1968	1642–0757
Although Rufus warns him not to, Bert signs up for a credit card and spends far too much. He then loans the card to Rufus, who promptly loses it.
9	9	"A View From the Teraza (or Let's Hear It For the Old Man)"	Peter Baldwin	Milt Rosen, Jack Rose, Mel Tolkin	November 27, 1968	1642–0758
Rufus and Bert compete against another restaurant.
10	10	"Guess Who's Coming to Poker?"	Unknown	Unknown	December 4, 1968	1642–0759
Bert is upset when his poker buddies don't want Rufus joining in their game.
11	11	"Sake to Me"	Unknown	Unknown	December 11, 1968	1642–0760
Rufus and Bert try to duplicate their old U.S. Army mess sergeant's recipe for pancakes, the key ingredient for which is sake, and they go too far with the sake.
12	12	"Ouzo Annie"	Unknown	Unknown	December 18, 1968	1642–0761
Rufus and Bert help their Greek handyman Niko impress his mother by letting him pose as the owner of Bert's Place.
13	13	"Take a Computer to Lunch"	Unknown	Unknown	January 1, 1969	1642–0762
Rufus tries a computer dating service and the computer identifies Claudia as his ideal mate.
14	14	"They Eat By Night"	Unknown	Unknown	January 8, 1969	1642–0763
Hoping to attract truck drivers to Bert's Place, Rufus persuades Claudia to pose as a gum-chewing, sharp-tongued, wisecracking waitress called "Frisco Fritzi." It works, and a large number of truckers, including Rufus's old friend Big Tom, show up to eat at Bert’s Place, leaving Bert struggling both to cook for them all and to keep them away from Claudia. Alan Hale Jr. guest-stars as Big Tom.
15	15	"Wanted: An Honest Thief"	Unknown	Unknown	January 15, 1969	1642–0764
Bert and Rufus decide to operate Bert's Place as a 24-hour diner, requiring them to hire additional staff, and the man they hire turns out to be an ex-convict.
16	16	"The Importance of Being Hairy"	Unknown	Unknown	January 22, 1969	1642–0765
Believing that Bert is unhappy about getting older and being bald, Rufus goes to a lot of trouble to surprise him with a toupée for his birthday, but Bert hurts his feelings by flatly refusing to wear it. Then Claudia persuades Bert to try it on – and, to her dismay, he becomes a changed man.
17	17	"The Courtship of Miles Butterworth (or Big Tom Gets Married)"	Reza S. Badiyi	Jack Rose, Mel Tolkin	January 29, 1969	1642–0766
Too tongue-tied to propose to his girlfriend Gertie, Big Tom talks Rufus into doing it on his behalf, then gets cold feet about the wedding. Gertie's three protective brothers hold Rufus responsible for making sure the often-drunk Big Tom shows up at the wedding – and arrives sober. Alan Hale Jr. guest-stars as Big Tom.
18	18	"The World's Second-Greatest Lover"	Unknown	Unknown	February 5, 1969	1642–0767
Bert hires a man who is irresistible to women but unhappy about it.
19	19	"Win, Place and Kill"	Hal Cooper	Dick Bensfield, Perry Grant	February 12, 1969	1642–0768
A bookie who has been operating out of Bert's Place flees, and Rufus and Bert frantically try to hide $50,000 from two thugs who come looking for the missing bookie.
20	20	"Father Knows Nothing"	Unknown	Unknown	February 19, 1969	1642–0769
Claudia’s stuffy father, Henry Arsdale, visits and is surprised and disappointed to find her working at a diner, so he tries to convince Bert and Rufus to let him take her on a Florida vacation by making them believe he does not have long to live. Jim Backus guest-stars as Henry.
21	21	"Once More Without Feeling"	Unknown	Unknown	February 26, 1969	1642–0771
A Hollywood movie studio uses the diner as the setting for a dramatic movie starring Rufus, Bert, and Claudia.
22	22	"The Splitting Headache"	Unknown	Unknown	March 5, 1969	1642–0770
Big Tom moves in with Rufus after getting into a fight with Gertie. When Rufus finds that he can't stand living with the boisterous Big Tom, he and Bert come up with a scheme to get Big Tom to move out by having Rufus romance Gertie. Alan Hale Jr. guest-stars as Big Tom.
23	23	"Love Comes to Annie Butterworth"	Beryl Gelfond	Jack Rose, Mel Tolkin	March 12, 1969	1642–0772
Trying to get his widowed father-in-law, Henry, out of his life by finding him a wife, Bert tries to fix him up with a female astrologer, but Bert's plan goes awry when the astrologer tells Henry that the stars say that his fate is to marry Rufus’s mother, Annie. Jim Backus guest-stars as Henry.
24	24	"The Best Ship of All is Friendship"	Unknown	Unknown	March 19, 1969	1642–0773
Bert is forced to auction off the diner – and Rufus accidentally buys it.
25	25	"The Bluebook Blues"	Unknown	Unknown	March 26, 1969	1642–0774
Claudia's father, Henry, gets Claudia invited to an upscale social event thrown by her old boyfriend, Dewey Hamilton. Bert is suspicious that Henry is trying to get Claudia to leave him for Dewey, and Bert and Rufus pose as waiters to keep an eye on her. Jim Backus guest-stars as Henry.

=== Season 2 (1969–1970) ===
No. overall	No. in season	Title	Directed by	Written by	Original release date	Prod. code
26	1	"Winer, Diner and Mover"	Alan Rafkin	Arthur Alsberg, Don Nelson	September 26, 1969	1642–0954
Bert decides to move the diner – building and all – to a new beachfront location, and wants to do it without Claudia catching on. Rufus has given up driving his cab and become a full partner in the diner – now renamed Bert and Rufe's Place – so Bert places him in charge of moving the diner while he takes Claudia out for a night on the town so he can surprise her with the move – and she is very surprised.
27	2	"Two's a Crowd"	Unknown	Unknown	October 3, 1969	1642–0951
After Bert and Rufus have an argument, they decide to divide the diner in two with a line down the middle, and Bert buys Rufus's share of their partnership, taking on all of Rufus's responsibilities. The division of the diner in two is more than its customers can bear, and Bert has nightmares about how Rufus will survive without him – only to discover that Rufus does not miss him at all.
28	3	"To Catch a Rufus"	Unknown	Dick Bensfield, Perry Grant	October 10, 1969	1642–0953
Bert finds that money is disappearing from the diner's cash register and can't believe Rufus could have been stealing it, but he sets out to use a hidden camera to catch Rufus in the act anyway.
29	4	"Fly in My Stew"	Unknown	Unknown	October 17, 1969	1642–0952
Mr. Middleton, a health inspector, threatens to close Bert and Rufe's Place and puts it on probation, forcing Bert and Rufus to give the diner a makeover so it will pass inspection. Vincent Price guest-stars as Mr. Middleton.
30	5	"Claudia Sows a Few"	Unknown	Unknown	October 24, 1969	1642–0956
While Bert and Claudia are driving, Claudia decides to beautify the countryside by sowing flower seed capsules from their moving car's window, but two suspicious policemen think she is trying to plant marijuana seeds and arrest them.
31	6	"Total Honesty"	Unknown	Unknown	October 31, 1969	1642–0955
Rufus and Bert encounter their old U.S. Army captain, and believing him to be down on his luck, decide a throw a benefit for him, not realizing that he actually is a millionaire.
32	7	"Fireman, Save My Diner"	George Tyne	Arnold Horwitt	November 7, 1969	1642–0957
Hoping to get firemen to eat at Bert and Rufe's Place, Rufus and Bert decide to join the volunteer fire department. Rufus is accepted because he gets along with the firehouse dog, but Bert is rejected because the dog dislikes him.
33	8	"Biggest Madre of Them All"	Jerry Davis	Si Rose	November 14, 1969	1642–0958
An old prospector named Sierra Jake who has no money to pay for his breakfast pays his bill with a ragged treasure map he claims leads to a pirate's bounty. Bert laughs it off, but Rufus is convinced the map is real, and Rufus, Bert, and Claudia set off to discover the fortune, arousing Bert's suspicions that Rufus will double-cross Claudia and him.
34	9	"No Orchids for the Diner"	Coby Ruskin	Ron Friedman	November 21, 1969	1642–0959
Rufus and Bert learn that a famous jet-set restaurant critic named Lilli Resphighi lives nearby, so they set out to get her to give Bert and Rufe's Place a good review. When Lilli and her entourage visit the diner, Bert wears a toupée to impress her, but everything he does to impress her with his culinary skills ends in disaster. However, Rufus charms Lilli, and she agrees to sample a picnic lunch from the diner. Phyllis Diller guest-stars as Lilli.
35	10	"The Eyes Have It"	Seymour Robbie	Robert Fisher, Arthur Marx	November 28, 1969	1642–0961
Claudia's eyesight is failing and she wants to get eyeglasses, but Bert talks her into getting contact lenses instead – and after she does, Rufus accidentally drops one of them into a pie.
36	11	"The Chimp"	Alan Rafkin	Arnold Horwitt	December 5, 1969	1642–0960
Rufus finds a chimpanzee named Sam abandoned at his doorstep and trains Sam to wait on tables at the diner. Sam becomes so popular with the customers at Bert and Rufe's Place that Bert becomes jealous of him – and Sam is so good at waiting on tables that he receives an offer to open a restaurant of his own.
37	12	"A Familiar Ring"	Unknown	Unknown	December 12, 1969	1642–0962
Claudia loses her engagement ring, and a battle over the insurance money for the ring ensues when she wants to use it to buy new fixtures for the diner and Bert wants to use it to replace the ring.
38	13	"Communication Gap"	Charles Rondeau	Howard Albrecht, Lee Loeb	December 19, 1969	1642–0963
When Bert and Rufus take a communications class taught by an attractive female psychologist, Rufus becomes smitten with her.
39	14	"A Fine Kettle of Fish"	Unknown	Unknown	January 2, 1970	1642–0964
Bert and Claudia are excited to take a long-delayed vacation together, and leave Rufus in charge of the diner and of taking care of their landlord's rare tropical fish, but his bungling interferes with their plans.
40	15	"Deep Are the Roots"	Unknown	Unknown	January 9, 1970	1642–0967
Rufus has his family tree done and is depressed to learn that he comes from a long line of cowards. The discovery undermines his desire to summon the courage to stand up to a gruff landowner in order to impress Bert and Claudia's nephew, so Bert and Claudia try to boost his ego.
41	16	"Compulsion"	Unknown	Unknown	January 16, 1970	1642–0965
To deal with Rufus's craving for candy, Bert sends him to the office of Dr. Booth, who cures him via hypnosis – but Rufus becomes stuck in a trance.
42	17	"Art a la Carte"	Charles Rondeau	Albert E. Lewin	January 23, 1970	1642–0966
To try to help an artist who draws portraits for food and is seeking exposure for his paintings, Rufus and Bert happily display his paintings on the diner's walls, but the paintings drive away all of the diner's customers.
