= Bob Denver =

American actor (1935–2005)

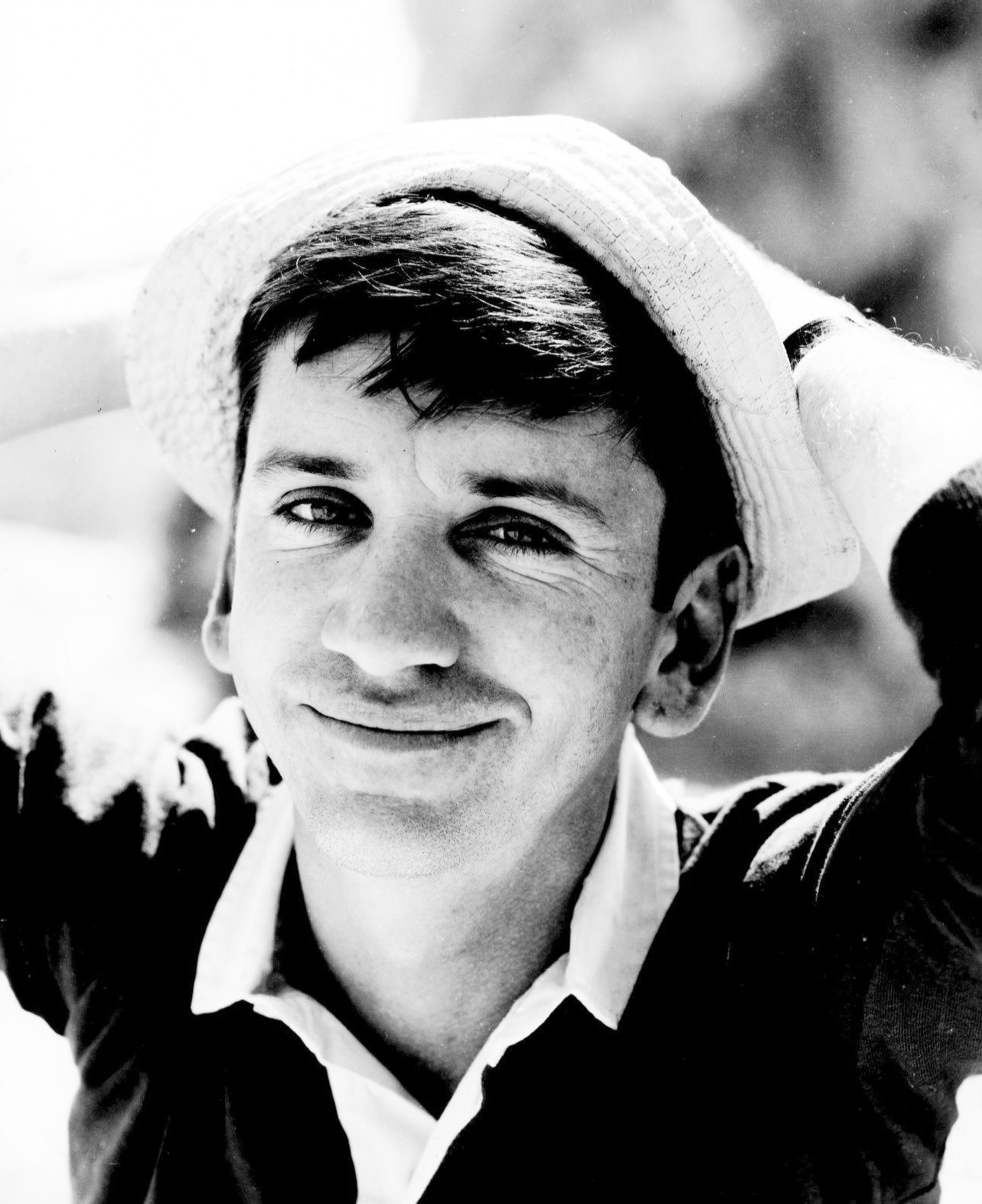
- Denver on the set of Gilligan's Island in 1965
- Born: Robert Osbourne Denver; January 9, 1935; New Rochelle, New York, U.S.
- Died: September 2, 2005 (aged 70); Winston-Salem, North Carolina, U.S.
- Education: Loyola University
- Occupation: Actor
- Years active: 1959–2001
- Known for: Gilligan's Island; The Many Loves of Dobie Gillis; Rescue from Gilligan's Island; The Castaways on Gilligan's Island; The Harlem Globetrotters on Gilligan's Island
- Spouses: Maggie Ryan (m. 1960; div. 1966); Jean Webber (m. 1967; div. 1970); Carole Abrahams (m. 1972; div. 1975); Dreama Perry (m. 1979)
- Children: 4

Robert Osbourne Denver (January 9, 1935 – September 2, 2005) was an American comedic actor who portrayed beatnik Maynard G. Krebs on the 1959–1963 series The Many Loves of Dobie Gillis and Gilligan on the 1964–1967 television series Gilligan's Island.

== Early life ==
Denver was born on January 9, 1935, in New Rochelle, New York, the son of Arthur Leo Denver (1895–1957) and Marion R. Denver (née Osborne, 1902–1990), and he was raised in Brownwood, Texas. He graduated in 1953 from David Starr Jordan High School in Long Beach, California and Loyola University of Los Angeles in California, with a degree in political science. He acted in college productions at Loyola and met fellow student Dwayne Hickman, with whom he later co-starred in The Many Loves of Dobie Gillis.

After graduation, he coached physical education and taught mathematics and history at Corpus Christi School, a Catholic elementary school in Pacific Palisades, California.

== Career ==
Most of Denver's acting career was in television, though he also appeared in several films and on Broadway. He was widely associated with the title character that he played in the 1960s television series Gilligan's Island, and he continued to appear as Gilligan in several movies, as a guest on other television series, in personal appearances, and as a voice actor in the animated version of the series.

=== Television career ===
Denver made his television debut in 1957, playing a small part in an episode of The Silent Service (S01 E37: "The Loss of the Tang"). While teaching at Corpus Christi School in 1958, Denver was permitted to audition for a role on the sitcom The Many Loves of Dobie Gillis as a favor to his sister, who was a secretary on the production lot. He gained the role and left teaching the following year to become a regular on the series. From 1959 to 1963, he appeared on the series as Maynard G. Krebs, the teenaged beatnik best friend of Dobie Gillis, played by Dwayne Hickman. After filming the first three episodes, Denver received his draft notice, and was briefly written out of the script and replaced, but he was designated 4-F due to an old neck injury and returned to Dobie Gillis having missed only one episode. Denver later reprised his Maynard G. Krebs role in the television sequels Whatever Happened to Dobie Gillis? (1977) and Bring Me the Head of Dobie Gillis (1988).

During his time on Dobie Gillis, Denver appeared on the NBC interview program, Here's Hollywood. In 1963, Denver played his only major dramatic role on television, as a physician (Dr. Paul Garrett) in one episode of Dr. Kildare, telecast on October 10, 1963; the episode, "If You Can't Believe the Truth ...", also featured Barbara Eden and Ken Berry. Between the end of Dobie Gillis and the beginning of Gilligan's Island, Denver appeared in an episode of The Farmer's Daughter and in the final episode of The Danny Thomas Show. He also had a one-episode role replacing the actor who played Dudley A. "Dud" Wash, the fiancé of Charlene Darling of the Darlings, on The Andy Griffith Show which was aired March 30, 1964. This was done by the network to promote Denver's face and make him more familiar to the viewing audience since Gilligan's Island was about to go on air.

Following the cancellation of Dobie Gillis, Denver landed the title role on the sitcom Gilligan's Island, which ran for three seasons (1964–67) on CBS, and became a staple of later syndication. His role as the well-meaning but bumbling first mate among a small group of shipwrecked castaways became the one for which he is most remembered. During the run, Denver privately went out of his way to help his co-stars, who warmly appreciated his efforts, such as successfully demanding that Russell Johnson and Dawn Wells be included in the series' opening credits (which also included a nod to their respective characters in the opening theme song), and insisting that Wells get an equal share of the series' publicity with Tina Louise. A decade after the series was canceled, Denver played Gilligan in the made-for-TV reunion movies Rescue from Gilligan's Island (1978), The Castaways on Gilligan's Island (1979), and The Harlem Globetrotters on Gilligan's Island (1981). He also lent his voice to the animated series The New Adventures of Gilligan and its sequel, Gilligan's Planet. During the 1980s and 1992, he reprised the character of Gilligan for numerous cameo appearances, including episodes of ALF, Meego and Baywatch, and played a bartender in the film Back to the Beach (1987).

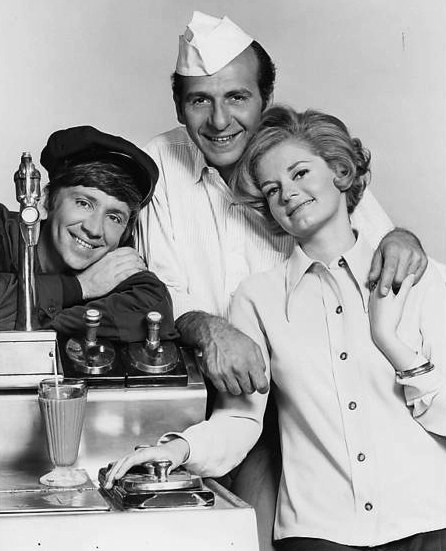
The cast of The Good Guys, 1968: From left: Denver, Herb Edelman and Joyce Van Patten

After Gilligan's Island, Denver went on to star on other TV comedy series, including The Good Guys (1968–1970), Dusty's Trail (1973–1974) (a show similar to Gilligan's Island, involving a lost wagon train headed to California), and the Sid and Marty Krofft children's program Far Out Space Nuts (1975). Four episodes of Dusty's Trail were later combined to create a feature film, The Wackiest Wagon Train in the West (1976).

Denver's other television roles included guest appearances on multiple episodes of Love, American Style; The Love Boat; and Fantasy Island. In 1983, he starred in the television pilot The Invisible Woman as the bumbling mad scientist uncle of the title character.

=== Film career ===
Denver's first feature film appearance was in the service farce, A Private's Affair (1959), with Sal Mineo. Credited as Robert Denver, he had a small role in the Jimmy Stewart film, Take Her, She's Mine (1963), playing a beatnik poet working at a coffee shop. Denver also appeared in the beach film For Those Who Think Young (1964) with Tina Louise prior to the development of Gilligan's Island.

Other films in which Denver appeared include Who's Minding the Mint? (1967), The Sweet Ride (1968), Did You Hear the One About the Traveling Saleslady? (1968) with Phyllis Diller, and The Wackiest Wagon Train in the West (1976). In 1983, he appeared in the television movie High School U.S.A.. His final role was a small part in the Frankie Avalon-Annette Funicello comedy Back to the Beach (1987).

=== Other work ===
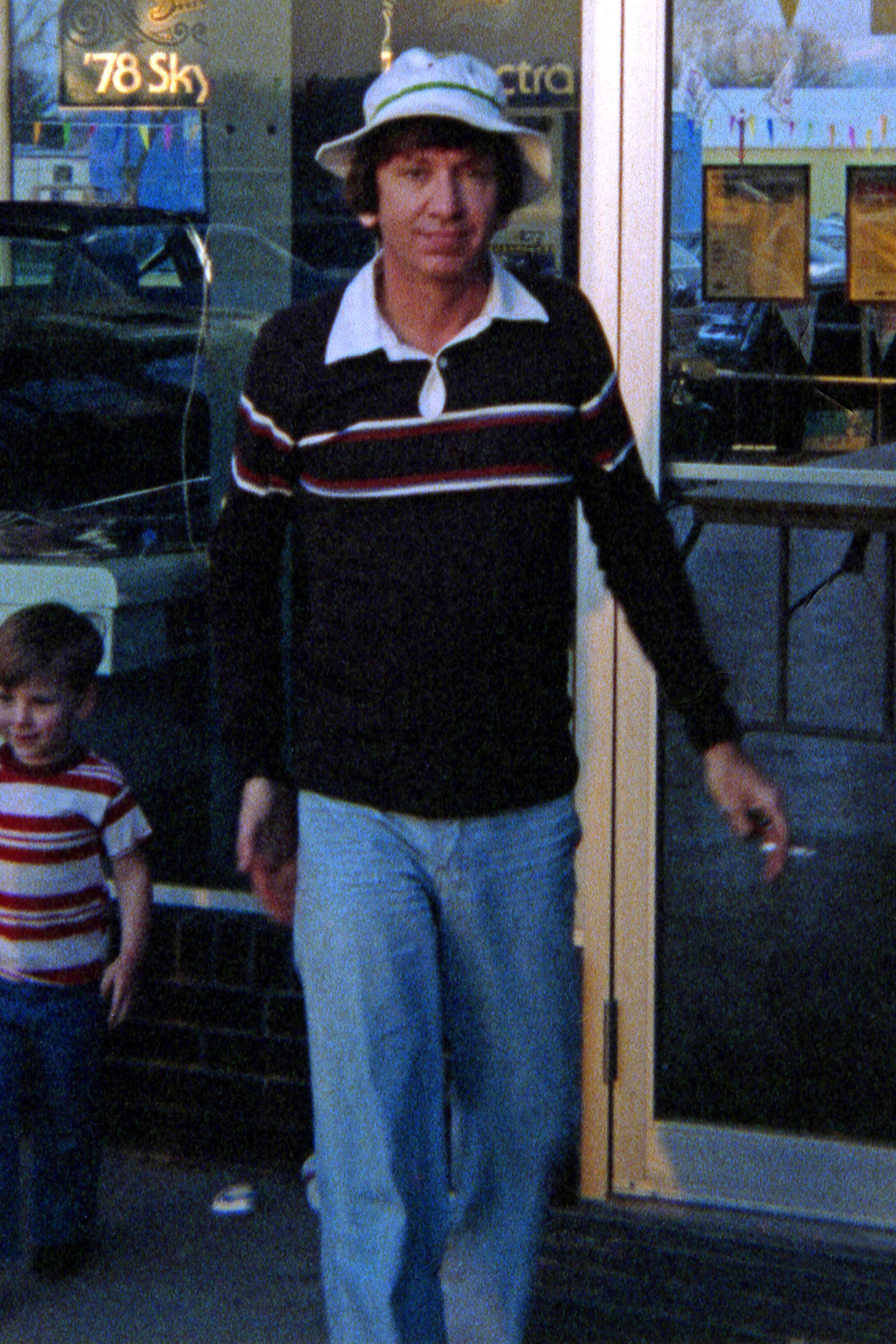
Denver in 1977

In 1970, Denver replaced Woody Allen in the role of Alan Felix in the original Broadway production of Allen's comedy Play It Again, Sam, earning praise from The New York Times chief theater critic Clive Barnes for conveying "a genuine clown-like wistfulness" that Barnes had found lacking in Allen's own performance in the starring role.

== Personal life and death ==
Denver was married four times. With his first wife, Maggie Ryan, he had a son and a daughter. He was later married to Jean Webber (1967–1970) and Carole Abrahams (1972–1975), and with the latter fathered a daughter, Emily. His last wife was Dreama Perry, to whom he was married until his death and with whom he fathered a son, Colin in January 1984. Colin was diagnosed with autism and a seizure disorder aged two in January 1986.

On February 7, 1971, Denver was arrested in Anderson, California for possession of marijuana and drug paraphernalia in his car and pleaded no contest for a reduced sentence of a $250 fine. In 1998, he was arrested for marijuana delivered to his home, originally saying that the delivery came from Dawn Wells, who played Mary Ann on Gilligan's Island, but he later refused to name her in court, testifying that "some crazy fan must have sent it." He pleaded no contest and received six months probation.

Later in his life, Denver returned to his adopted home of Princeton, West Virginia, and became an FM radio personality. He and his wife Dreama ran a small "oldies format" radio station, WGAG-LP 93.1 FM. He also earned a small income making public appearances, often costumed as Gilligan. In 1992, he played Gilligan to benefit the Make-A-Wish Foundation for a West Virginia fundraiser for the organization.

Denver was a heavy smoker. He received cancer treatment and underwent heart bypass surgery in 2005. On September 2, 2005, he died at age 70 from complications, including pneumonia following throat cancer surgery at Wake Forest University Baptist Medical Center in Winston-Salem, North Carolina.

== Filmography ==
=== Film ===
Year	Title	Role	Notes
1959	A Private's Affair	MacIntosh	
1963	Take Her, She's Mine	Alex	
1964	For Those Who Think Young	Kelp	
1967	Who's Minding the Mint?	Willie Owens	
1968	The Sweet Ride	Choo-Choo Burns	
1968	Did You Hear the One About the Traveling Saleslady?	Bertram Webb	
1976	The Wackiest Wagon Train in the West	Dusty	
1987	Back to the Beach	Bartender	

=== Television ===
Year	Title	Role	Notes
1957	The Silent Service	Murph	Episode: "The Tang's Last Shot"
1959–1963	The Many Loves of Dobie Gillis	Maynard G. Krebs	Main cast, 144 episodes
1963	Dr. Kildare	Dr. Paul Garrett	Episode: "If You Can't Believe the Truth"
1963	The Farmer's Daughter	Lieutenant Tenner	Episode: "An Enterprising Young Man"
1964	The Andy Griffith Show	Dud Wash	Episode: "Divorce, Mountain Style"
1964	The Danny Thomas Show	Herbie	Episode: "The Persistent Cop"
1964–1967	Gilligan's Island	Gilligan	Lead role, 98 episodes
1967	I Dream of Jeannie	Harold	Episode: "My Son, the Genie"
1968–1970	The Good Guys	Rufus Butterworth	Lead role, 42 episodes
1970–1973	Love, American Style	Earl / Jeffrey / Sam Cosgrove	3 episodes
1973–1974	Dusty's Trail	Dusty	Lead role, 26 episodes
1974–1975	The New Adventures of Gilligan	Gilligan	Voice, 24 episodes
1975	Far Out Space Nuts	Junior	Lead role, 15 episodes
1977	Whatever Happened to Dobie Gillis?	Maynard G. Krebs	TV movie
1977	Captain Kangaroo	Himself	1 episode
1978	Rescue from Gilligan's Island	Gilligan	TV movie
1979	The Love Boat	Jason Markham	2 episodes
1979	The Castaways on Gilligan's Island	Gilligan	TV movie
1980–1983	Fantasy Island	Morris Binstock; Francis Elkins; Don Winters; Tim Kearns	4 episodes
1981	The Harlem Globetrotters on Gilligan's Island	Gilligan	TV movie
1982	Twilight Theater	Various characters	TV movie
1982	The Love Boat	Norman Lomax	Episode; "A Dress to Remember"
1982	Scamps	Oliver Hopkins	TV movie
1982	Gilligan's Planet	Gilligan	Voice, 13 episodes
1983	The Invisible Woman	Dr. Dudley Plunkett	TV movie
1983	High School U.S.A.	Milton Feld	TV movie
1987	The New Gidget	Gilligan	Episode: "Gilligidge Island"
1987	ALF	Gilligan	Episode: "Somewhere Over the Rerun"
1988	Bring Me the Head of Dobie Gillis	Maynard G. Krebs	
1992	Baywatch	Gilligan	Episode: "Sit Right Back and You'll Hear a Tale"
1992	Phil Donahue Show	Himself	Episode: "Famous Past Celebrities"
1993	Evening Shade	Himself	2 episodes
1994	Space Ghost Coast to Coast	Himself	Episode: "Gilligan"
1994	Herman's Head	Himself	Episode: "The Herm from Ipanema"
1995	Roseanne	Jackie	Episode: "Sherwood Schwartz: A Loving Tribute"
1997	Meego	Gilligan	Episode: "Mommy 'n' Meego" (final appearance)
1998	The Simpsons	Himself	Voice; Episode: "Simpson Tide"
2001	Surviving Gilligan's Island	Himself	TV movie
