= Joyce Van Patten =

American actress (born 1934)

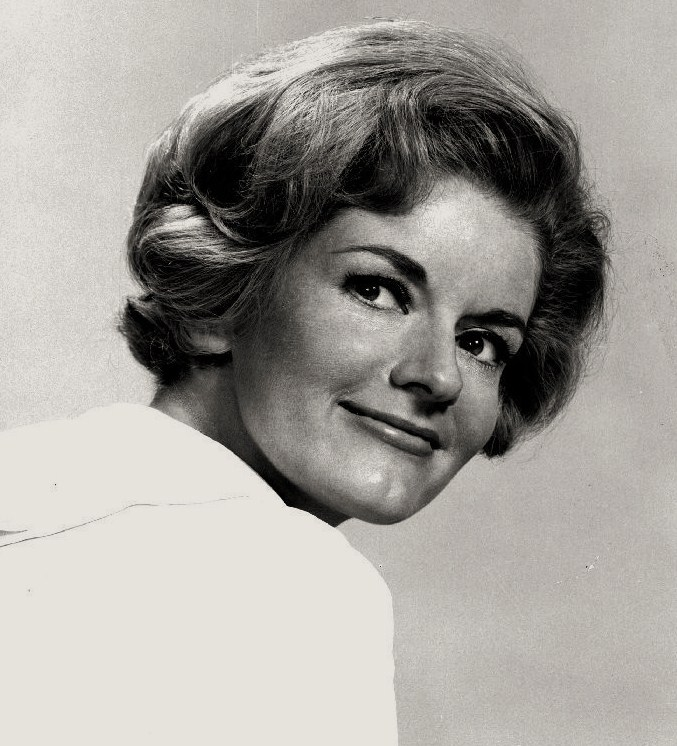
- Van Patten in 1969
- Born: March 9, 1934 (age 92); New York, New York
- Occupation: Actress
- Years active: 1943–2021
- Spouses: Martin Balsam (m. 1959; div. 1962) Dennis Dugan (m. 1977; div. 1987)
- Children: Talia Balsam
- Relatives: Dick Van Patten (brother); Tim Van Patten (half-brother); Vincent Van Patten (nephew); Grace Van Patten (niece); Anna Van Patten (niece)

Joyce Van Patten (born March 9, 1934) is an American film and stage actress. She is best known for her roles in films like The Bad News Bears (1976), St. Elmo's Fire (1985) (as Mrs. Beamish), and as Gloria Noonan in Grown Ups (2010).

== Career ==
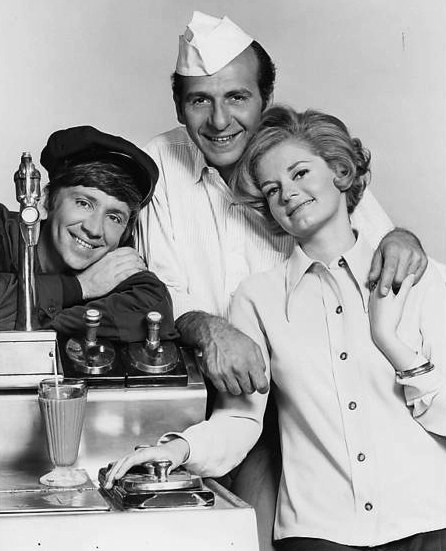
The cast of The Good Guys, 1968: From left: Bob Denver, Herb Edelman and Van Patten

Van Patten has appeared in dozens of television series. She portrayed Janice Turner on As the World Turns. She made her television debut as a featured regular on The Danny Kaye Show, after which she co-starred with Bob Denver and Herb Edelman in the 1968–70 sitcom The Good Guys as Claudia Gramus, the long-suffering wife of diner owner Bert Gramus (played by Edelman). She appeared in two episodes of Perry Mason ("The Case of the Prankish Professor" and "The Case of the Thermal Thief"). She appeared in guest or recurring roles on Stoney Burke, Hawaii Five-O, Gunsmoke (as bar girl "Molly" in "Anybody Can Kill a Marshal" - S8E26), The Untouchables, The Law and Mr. Jones, The Twilight Zone ("Passage on the Lady Anne"), The Jack Benny Program, Family Affair, The Many Loves of Dobie Gillis, The Andy Griffith Show, Mr. Novak, The Outer Limits, Mannix, The Rockford Files, The Bob Newhart Show, The Odd Couple, The F.B.I., Lou Grant, Law & Order, Oz, and The Sopranos. On a 1976 episode of Columbo, "Old Fashioned Murder", Van Patten played the lead, as a museum owner and curator. In 1974, she had a minor role in the episode "Negative Reaction" (with Dick Van Dyke) of the same series. In 1979, she starred as Iris Chapman in The Mary Tyler Moore Hour, and appeared in The Martian Chronicles the following year. In 1995, she played Maureen, Jennie's mother, for two seasons on the WB sitcom Unhappily Ever After. In 2005, she played Carol Prudy, Susan Mayer's stepmother, on two episodes of Desperate Housewives.

Her film credits include I Love You, Alice B. Toklas (1968), The Trouble with Girls (1969), Pussycat, Pussycat, I Love You (1970), Making It (1971), Something Big (1971), Bone (1972), Thumb Tripping (1972), Mame (1974), The Manchu Eagle Murder Caper Mystery (1975), The Bad News Bears (1976), Mikey and Nicky (1976), The Falcon and the Snowman (1985), St. Elmo's Fire (1985), Billy Galvin (1986), Blind Date (1987), Monkey Shines (1988), Grown Ups (2010), This Must Be the Place (2011), and God's Pocket (2014). In 2018 she appeared in the short film The Rest.

=== Theatre ===
At age 9, Van Patten made her stage debut in Tomorrow, the World!. She appeared on Broadway in, among other shows, A Hole in the Head, Brighton Beach Memoirs, Murder at the Howard Johnson's, Rumours, Jake's Women and Rabbit Hole. She appeared off-Broadway in such dramas as Love, Loss, and What I Wore, The Vagina Monologues, and Chekhov's The Seagull. She also appeared and recorded, with Charles Aidman and Naomi Caryl Hirschhorn, excerpts from Spoon River Anthology.

== Personal life ==
Van Patten is the sister of actor Dick Van Patten.

Van Patten was married to actor Martin Balsam from 1959 to 1962 and they had a daughter, actress Talia Balsam. Her second marriage – to actor Dennis Dugan – began, circa spring 1977, with a private ceremony conducted in Jackson Hole, Wyoming, They divorced in 1987. (Note: Although a widely disseminated 1988 Knight Ridder column gives the duration as 1974 to 1987, it seems clear, based both on a 1975 profile/interview–in which the interviewer identifies him as "her boyfriend, Dennis Dugan, a movie actor"–and a news mention made as late as November 1977, dubbing him "Joyce Van Patten's roommate of four years' standing in real life", that the prior three-to-four-year portion of the 1970s simply comprised that period of partner-ship and cohabitation that immediately preceded the official ceremony.)

== Filmography ==
=== Film ===
Year	Title	Role	Notes
1951	Fourteen Hours	Barbara (uncredited)	
1958	The Goddess	Hillary	
1968	I Love You, Alice B. Toklas	Joyce	
1969	The Trouble with Girls	Maude	
1970	Pussycat, Pussycat, I Love You	Anna	
1970	But I Don't Want to Get Married!	Olga	
1971	Making It	Betty Fuller	
1971	Something Big	Polly Standall	
1972	Bone	Bernadette	
1972	Thumb Tripping	Mother	
1974	Mame	Sally Cato	
1975	The Manchu Eagle Murder Caper Mystery	Ida Mae	
1976	The Bad News Bears	Cleveland	
1976	Mikey and Nicky	Jan	
1979	Shadow of Fear	Laura Stewart	
1985	The Falcon and the Snowman	Mrs. Boyce	
1985	St. Elmo's Fire	Mrs. Beamish	
1986	Billy Galvin	Mae Galvin	
1987	Blind Date	Nadia's Mother	
1988	Monkey Shines	Dorothy Mann	
1989	Trust Me	Nettie Brown	
1996	Infinity	Aunt Ruth	
1998	Show & Tell	Mrs. Mahler	
2006	My Mother's Hairdo	Mary	Short film
2008	Marley & Me	Mrs. Butterfly	
2010	Grown Ups	Gloria Noonan	
2011	This Must Be the Place	Dorothy Shore	
2011	Peace, Love & Misunderstanding	Mariam	
2011	The People in the Picture		Video
2012	The Fitzgerald Family Christmas	Mrs. McGowan	
2013	Angel's Perch	Polly	
2014	God's Pocket	Aunt Sophie	
2018	The Rest	Mary	Short film
2018	Diane	Madge	
2019	Alzheimer's	Nancy	Short film

=== Television ===
Year	Title	Role	Notes
1946	NBC Television Theatre		Season 1 Episode 4: ”The Flattering Word”
1948	The Philco Television Playhouse		Season 1 Episode 1: ”Dinner at Eight”
1949–1951	Kraft Television Theatre	Mary	3 episodes
1950	Armstrong Circle Theatre		Season 1 Episode 21: ”Time of Their Lives”
1952	The Web		Season 2 Episode 28: "The Terrible Truth"
1954	Mama		3 episodes
1954	The Big Story	Valerie Foster	Season 6 Episode 2: "Charles McKinney of the Tulsa World"
1956–1957	As the World Turns	Janice Turner Hughes #1	
1956	Robert Montgomery Presents		Season 8 Episode 11: "The Misfortunes of Mr. Minihan"
1959–1960	Young Doctor Malone	Clara Kershaw	
1959	Deadline	Waitress	Season 1 Episode 9: "Charm Boy"
1961	The Law and Mr. Jones	Ethel	Season 1 Episode 20: "Cold Turkey"
1961	Ben Casey	Stella Maxwell	Season 1 Episode 10: "The Sweet Kiss of Madness"
1961–1963	The Many Loves of Dobie Gillis	Ethel Bronkowski / Mrs. Maude Pomfritt / Speed Pulitzer	3 episodes
1962	Bus Stop	Betty	Season 1 Episode 18: "Turn Home Again"
1962	Target: The Corruptors!	Madeleine	Season 1 Episode 21: "Fortress of Despair"
1962	Checkmate	Marcia James	Season 2 Episode 20: "Remembrance of Crimes Past"
1962	The Detectives	Phyllis	Season 3 Episode 20: "Night Boat"
1962	Wide Country	Nina Corbello	Season 1 Episode 4: "Who Killed Edde Gannon?"
1962	The New Loretta Young Show	Charlotte Ramey	Season 1 Episode 6: "First Assignment"
1962–1963	Dr. Kildare	Julie Belmanno / Ruth Scully	2 episodes
1963	The Alfred Hitchcock Hour	Grace Thorpe	Season 1 Episode 23: "The Lonely Hours"
1963	Gunsmoke	Molly	Season 8 Episode 26: "Anybody Can Kill a Marshal"
1963	Stoney Burke	Laura Fredericks	Season 1 Episode 23: "Joby"
1963	The Lloyd Bridges Show	Doris Baxter	Season 1 Episode 26: "The Sheridan Square"
1963	The Untouchables	Claire Vale	Season 4 Episode 23: "The Spoiler"
1963	The Twilight Zone	Eileen Ransome	Episode 4 Episode 17: "Passage on the Lady Anne"
1963	The Defenders	Nora Slater	Season 3 Episode 13: "Fugue for Trumpet and Small Boy"
1963–1965	Perry Mason	Sally Sheldon / Fay Gilmer	2 episodes
1964	The Outer Limits	Rhea Cashman	Season 1 Episode 29: "A Feasibility Study"
1965	Mr. Novak	Avis Brown	Season 2 Episode 14: "From the Brow of Zeus"
1965	Karen	Nora	Season 1 Episode 13: "Good Neighbor Policy"
1965	The Jack Benny Program	The Wife, Mrs. Goodheart	Season 15 Episode 16: "Jack Adopts a Son"
1965	Slattery's People	Barbara Harrison	Season 2 Episode 4: "The Unborn"
1965	The Virginian	Mary Stewart	Season 4 Episode 6: "Ring of Silence"
1965	A Man Called Shenandoah	Lily	Season 1 Episode 13: "The Siege"
1966	The Loner	Peggy Woodward	Season 1 Episode 22: "The Mourners for Johnny Sharp: Part 2"
1966	The Danny Kaye Show	Giovanni's Daughter-in-Law	Season 4 Episode 14: "Episode #4.14"
1966–1972	Insight	Mrs. Foley / Marie Slovak / Thelma Montanus	3 episodes
1967	Mr. Terrific	Margo	Season 1 Episode 8: "Stanley the Jailbreaker"
1967	Accidental Family	Martha	Season 1 Episode 3: "If You Knew Martha"
1967	The Andy Griffith Show	Laura Hollander	Season 8 Episode 5: "Opie Steps Up in Class"
1967	Iron Horse	Alice Fuller	Season 2 Episode 15: "Death Has Two Faces"
1967–1973	Mannix	Lola Collins / Dodie Green	2 episodes
1968–1970	The Good Guys	Claudia Gramus	Series regular
1969	Spoon River	Reader	TV Movie
1970	Storefront Lawyers	Ella	Season 1 Episode 4: "The Electric Kid"
1970	The Odd Couple	Phyllis Parker	Season 1 Episode 7: "I Do, I Don't"
1970	Family Affair	Gail Spencer	Season 5 Episode 11: "Class Clown"
1970–1972	Hawaii Five-O	Lila Daniels / Rhoda Lovejoy	2 episodes
1970–1974	Love, American Style	Rona / Wanda Glass / Nikki / Marge / Janet	6 episodes
1971	The F.B.I.	Alice Kranz	Season 6 Episode 24: "Turnabout"
1971	The Bold Ones: The New Doctors	Millicent Wilson	Season 3 Episode 1: "Broken Melody"
1971	Nichols	Arletta McGreevy	Season 1 Episode 4: "Paper Badge"
1972	The Bravos	(uncredited)	TV Movie
1972	McCloud	Lucy Sloan	Season 2 Episode 5: "A Little Plot at Tranquil Valley"
1972	The Don Rickles Show	Jean Benedict	2 episodes
1972	Cannon	Kate Werner Macklin	Season 1 Episode 21: "A Flight of Hawks"
1972	Medical Center	Paula Eckhart	Season 4 Episode 6: "Betrayed"
1973	The Bob Newhart Show	Connie Miller	Season 1 Episode 15: "Let's Get Away from It Almost"
1973	The Streets of San Francisco	Mrs. Rudolph	Season 1 Episode 21: "The House on Hyde Street"
1973	Young Dr. Kildare	Nurse Marvin	Episode: ”Mercy Killing”
1973	The New Dick Van Dyke Show	Henrietta	Season 3 Episode 5: "Mrs. Ferguson"
1973	Burt and the Girls		TV Movie
1974	Owen Marshall, Counselor at Law	Ruth Tannen	Season 3 Episode 14: "House of Friends"
1974	The Wide World of Mystery	Jane	Season 2 Episode 14: "The Book of Murder"
1974	Winter Kill	Grace Lockhard	TV Movie
1974	The Stranger Within	Phyllis	ABC Movie of the Week
1974	Amy Prentiss	Mrs. Hyser	Season 1 Episode 2: "The Desperate World of Jane Doe"
1974–1976	Columbo	Sister of Mercy / Ruth Lytton	2 episodes
1975	For the Use of the Hall	Alice	TV Movie
1975	Let's Switch!	Linette Robin	ABC Movie of the Week
1975	Winner Take All	Edie Gould	TV Movie
1977	The Rockford Files	Lianne Sweeny	2 episodes
1977	Lou Grant	Gloria Aldrige	Season 1 Episode 6: "Aftershock"
1977	Family	Mrs. Palmer	Season 3 Episode 6: "We Love You, Miss Jessup"
1978	To Kill a Cop	Betty Eischied	TV Movie
1978	Murder at the Mardi Gras	Janet Murphy	TV Movie
1978	The Comedy Company	Ellen Dietz	TV Movie
1978	The Plant Family	Lyla Plant – the mother	TV Movie
1979	Visions	Kit	Season 3 Episode 6: "Ladies in Waiting"
1979	The Mary Tyler Moore Hour	Iris Chapman	Series regular
1979	You Can't Take It with You	Miss Wellington	TV Movie
1979	A Christmas for Boomer	Lila Manchester	TV Movie
1980	The Martian Chronicles	Elma Parkhill	Miniseries
1981	Bulba	Barbara Thatcher	TV Movie
1982	Eleanor, First Lady of the World	'Tommy' Thompson	TV Movie
1982	Bus Stop	Grace	TV Movie
1983	Another Woman's Child	Janet Stein	TV Movie
1983	The Demon Murder Case	Connie Frazier	TV Movie
1983	In Defense of Kids	Caroline Ruben	TV Movie
1984	Crazy Like a Fox	Sally	Season 1 Episode 1: "Pilot"
1985	Malice in Wonderland	Dema Harshbarger	TV Movie
1985	Picking Up the Pieces	Harriet Goodman	TV Movie
1985	Tall Tales & Legends	Ma	Season 1 Episode 2: "Annie Oakley"
1986	Amazing Stories	Eva	Season 1 Episode 23: "One for the Books"
1986	Under the Influence	Helen Talbot	TV Movie
1987	CBS Summer Playhouse	Ilene	Season 1 Episode 15: "Sirens"
1991	The Haunted	Cora Miller	TV Movie
1991	Sisters	Belle Adderly	Season 1 Episode 4: "Devoted Husband, Loving Father"
1992	Maid for Each Other	Leila	TV Movie
1992	Brooklyn Bridge	Harriet Mueller	3 episodes
1993	Law & Order	Ramona Stark, Ph. D.	Season 3 Episode 11: "Extended Family"
1993	All My Children	Helen Marsh	14 episodes
1993	Diagnosis: Murder	Sarah Emerson	Season 1 Episode 3: "Murder at the Telethon"
1993	Bob	Joyce Leona-Curtis	Season 2 Episode 5: "Kiss and Sell"
1994	Breathing Lessons	Serena	TV Movie
1994	Northern Exposure	Pat Hillman	Season 5 Episode 21: "I Feel the Earth Move"
1994	The Gift of Love	Erika Magnussen	TV Movie
1994	All-American Girl	Emma	Season 1 Episode 12: "Loveless in San Francisco"
1995	Grandpa's Funeral	Iris Braimen	TV Movie
1995–1996	Unhappily Ever After	Maureen Slattery	Recurring role
1996	Jake's Women	Edith	TV Movie
1999	Touched by an Angel	Sylvia Mangione	Season 5 Episode 17: "Family Business"
1999	Now and Again	Psychiatrist	Season 1 Episode 6: "Nothing to Fear, but Nothing to Fear"
2002	Oz	Sarah Rebadow	Season 5 Episode 7: "Good Intentions"
2002	The Sopranos	Dr. Sandy Shaw	Episode: "Christopher"
2002	NYPD Blue	Ruth Dwyer	Season 10 Episode 9: "Half-Ashed"
2002–2003	Judging Amy	Jane, Eric's Lawyer	2 episodes
2005	Without a Trace	Paula	Season 4 Episode 6: "Viuda Negra"
2005	Desperate Housewives	Carol Prudy	2 episodes
2011	The Good Wife	Agnes Silvestre	Season 3 Episode 4: "Feeding the Rat"
2012	Made in Jersey	Lilla	Season 1 Episode 3: "Camelot"
2014	Boardwalk Empire	Mrs. Zeller – Crab Woman	Episode: "King of Norway"
2018	Cady Did	Marion Huffman	
2021	If I'm Alive Next Week...	Marjorie	Series regular

=== Stage ===
Year	Title	Role	Notes
1941	Popsy	Marie Antoinette Benson	Playhouse Theatre, Broadway
1943	This Rock	Mary	Longacre Theatre, Broadway
1943	Tomorrow the World	Patricia Frame	Ethel Barrymore Theatre, Broadway
1944	The Perfect Marriage	Helen Williams	Ethel Barrymore Theatre, Broadway
1945	The Wind is Ninety	Joan	Booth Theatre, Broadway
1946	The Bees and the Flowers	Ilka Morgan	Cort Theatre, Broadway
1955	The Desk Set	Elsa	Broadhurst Theatre, Broadway
1957	A Hole in the Head	Shirl	Plymouth Theatre, Broadway
1963	Spoon River Anthology	Reader	Booth Theatre, Broadway
1975	Same Time, Next Year	Doris (Replacement)	Brooks Atkinson Theatre, Broadway
1979	Murder at the Howard Johnson's	Arlene Miller	John Golden Theatre, Broadway
1980	I Ought to Be in Pictures	Steffy	Mark Taper Forum
1980	I Ought to Be in Pictures	Steffy	Eugene O'Neill Theatre, Broadway
1980	The Seagull	Paulina	The Public Theater, Off-Broadway
1981	The Supporting Cast	Florrie	Biltmore Theatre, Broadway
1982	Brighton Beach Memoirs	Blanche Morton	Ahmanson Theatre
1983	Brighton Beach Memoirs	Blanche Morton	Alvin Theatre, Broadway
1988	Rumors	Cookie Cusack	Broadhurst Theatre, Broadway
1988	All My Sons	Kate Keller	San Jose Repertory Theatre
1990	Jake's Women	Edith	Old Globe Theatre
1990	Ivanov	Marfa Yegorovna Babakina	Yale Repertory Theatre
1992	Jake's Women	Edith	Neil Simon Theatre, Broadway
1994	The Seagull	Paulina Andryevna	The Matrix Theatre Company
1997	Show Boat	Parthy Ann Hawks (Replacement)	National Tour
1997	Light Up The Sky	Stella Livingston	Hartford Stage
1998	More to Love	Maxine	Eugene O'Neill Theatre, Broadway
1998	Bells are Ringing	Sue	The Kennedy Center
1998	Labor Day	Ellen	Manhattan Theatre Club, Off-Broadway
1999	Ring Round the Moon	Isabelle's Mother	Belasco Theatre, Broadway
1999	It's My Party (And I'll Die if I Want To)	Dawn	Arclight Theater, Off-Broadway
2000	Taller Than a Dwarf	Mrs. Miller	Longacre Theatre, Broadway
2003	Harvey	Veta Louise Simmons	Laguna Playhouse
2004	The Oldest Profession	Ursula	Signature Theater Company, Off-Broadway
2005	Dead End	Mrs. Martin	Ahmanson Theatre
2006	Rabbit Hole	Nat	Geffen Playhouse
2007	The Cherry Orchard	Charlotta Ivanovna	Huntington Theatre Company
2011	The People in the Picture	Chayesel Fisher	Studio 54, Broadway
2012	The Great God Pan	Polly	Playwrights Horizons, Off-Broadway
2016	Her Requiem	Gram	Lincoln Center Theatre, Off-Broadway
