= Top-rated United States television programs of 1982–83 =

This table displays the top-rated primetime television series of the 1982–83 season as measured by Nielsen Media Research.

Rank	Program	Network	Rating
1	60 Minutes	CBS	25.5
2	Dallas	CBS	24.6
3	M*A*S*H	CBS	22.6
3	Magnum, P.I.	CBS	22.6
5	Dynasty	ABC	22.4
6	Three's Company	ABC	21.2
7	Simon & Simon	CBS	21.0
8	Falcon Crest	CBS	20.7
9	The Love Boat	ABC	20.3
10	The A-Team	NBC	20.1
10	Monday Night Football	ABC	20.1
12	The Jeffersons	CBS	20.0
12	Newhart	CBS	20.0
14	The Fall Guy	ABC	19.4
15	9 to 5	ABC	19.3
16	One Day at a Time	CBS	19.1
17	Hart to Hart	ABC	18.9
18	Gloria	CBS	18.7
18	Trapper John, M.D.	CBS	18.7
20	Knots Landing	CBS	18.6
21	Hill Street Blues	NBC	18.4
22	That's Incredible!	ABC	18.3
22	Archie Bunker's Place	CBS	18.3
24	ABC Monday Night Movie	ABC	18.0
25	Laverne & Shirley	ABC	17.8
26	ABC Sunday Night Movie	ABC	17.6
27	CBS Tuesday Night Movie	CBS	17.5
28	Happy Days	ABC	17.4
28	Little House: A New Beginning	NBC	17.4
30	Real People	NBC	17.2
30	The Dukes of Hazzard	CBS	17.2

== See also ==
Season ratings (newspapers.com: fully lists the top 98 shows for the season, though without ratings points)
