= Jeannie Berlin =

American actress and screenwriter (born 1949)

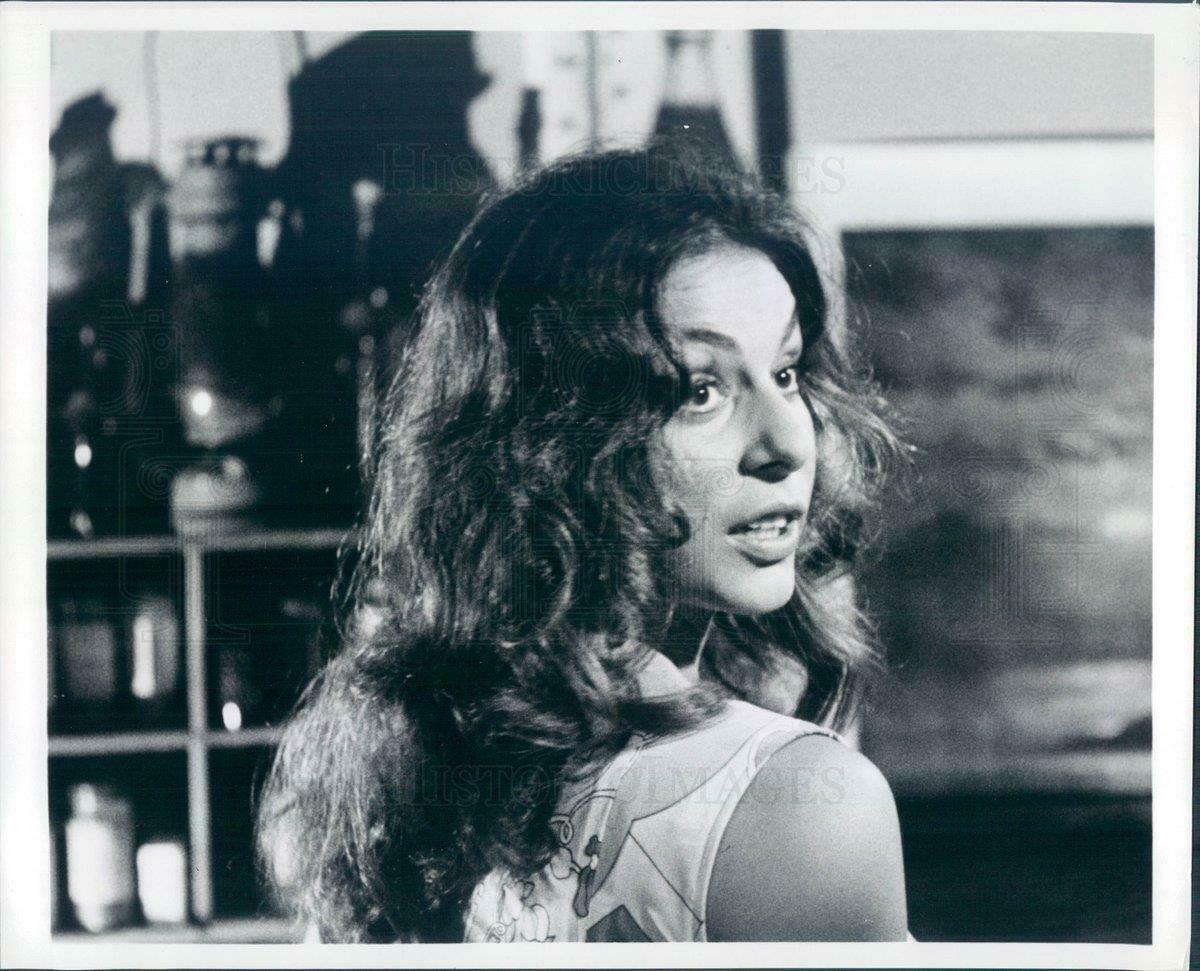
- Berlin in a press photo for the film Bone (1972)
- Born: Jeannie Brette May; November 1, 1949 (age 77); Los Angeles, California, U.S.
- Occupations: Actress and playwright
- Years active: 1969–present
- Known for: The Heartbreak Kid
- Parents: Marvin May (father); Elaine May (mother)

Jeannie Berlin (born Jeannie Brette May; November 1, 1949) is an American actress. She is the daughter of Elaine May. She is best known for her role in the 1972 comedy film The Heartbreak Kid, for which she received Academy Award and Golden Globe nominations for Best Supporting Actress. She later played the leading role in Sheila Levine Is Dead and Living in New York (1975), and has acted in films such as Margaret (2011), Inherent Vice (2014), Café Society (2016), The Fabelmans (2022), and You Hurt My Feelings (2023). She also acted in the HBO miniseries The Night Of (2016), the Amazon Prime series Hunters (2020), and the HBO series Succession (2019–2023).

== Early life ==
Born in Los Angeles, California, Berlin is the daughter of actress, comedienne, screenwriter, and director Elaine May (née Berlin) and inventor Marvin May. Elaine May directed The Heartbreak Kid, in 1972, featuring Berlin, whose performance earned her Golden Globe and Academy Award nominations for Best Supporting Actress. Berlin chose to use her mother's maiden name for her stage name.

== Career ==
Berlin made her screen debut appearing in a supporting role in the made-for-television film In Name Only starring Eve Arden. She acted on the New York stage and began appearing in a number of films, including Getting Straight (1970), The Strawberry Statement (1970), Move (1970), The Baby Maker (1970), Portnoy's Complaint (1971), and Bone (1972).

In 1972, Berlin's performance in the comedy film The Heartbreak Kid, directed by her mother and with a screenplay by Neil Simon, garnered her Golden Globe and Academy Award nominations for Best Supporting Actress. She also won National Society of Film Critics Award for Best Supporting Actress. In an article for The New York Times John Gruen wrote, "What is more, every critic said that Jeannie looks, sounds and acts exactly like her mother. One critic even said that she is a much better actress than her mother . . . 'with real blood coursing through her.' Anyway, this piece will set out to prove that Jeannie Berlin, who looks, talks, and acts exactly like Elaine May, is, in fact, Elaine May's 23‐year‐old daughter, and a person in her own right, even though . . . well, there's just no denying it, she looks, sounds, and acts exactly like her mother."

In 1975, Berlin played a leading role in the romantic comedy film Sheila Levine Is Dead and Living in New York. The film was not well received by critics; Stanley Eichelbaum, in the San Francisco Examiner, noted, "Jeannie is cold and hasn't the inner glow the appeal and magnetism that an actress needs to carry a film." The following year she had a leading role in Old Fashioned Murder, an episode of the NBC detective drama series Columbo. Berlin did not act in film or television again until 1990, when she appeared in and co-wrote the screenplay for the comedy-drama film In the Spirit starring her mother alongside Marlo Thomas and Olympia Dukakis.

Berlin appeared in a number of off-Broadway productions in the 1990s. She made her Broadway theater debut in May's play After the Night and the Music in 2005. In 2012, she appeared in the play Other Desert Cities at the Mark Taper Forum in Los Angeles. After an extended absence of more than a decade from acting in films, in 2011 she co-starred in Margaret, a psychological drama film starring Anna Paquin. She received positive reviews from film critics and was nominated for the National Society of Film Critics and Boston Society of Film Critics Award for Best Supporting Actress. She later appeared in Paul Thomas Anderson's crime film Inherent Vice (2014) and Woody Allen's romantic comedy-drama Café Society (2016).

In 2016, Berlin received glowing reviews for her performance as prosecutor Helen Weiss in the HBO miniseries The Night Of. In 2018 she played the President of the United States in the Hulu drama series The First, and the following year was cast as Cyd Peach, the head of the Roys' Fox News–esque TV station in the HBO drama series Succession. In 2020, she had a recurring role in the Amazon Prime Video drama series Hunters playing the grandmother of the lead character. In 2022, she starred in the coming-of-age drama film The Fabelmans directed by Steven Spielberg.

== Filmography ==
=== Film ===
Year	Title	Role	Notes
1970	Getting Straight	Judy Kramer	
1970	The Strawberry Statement	Girl with Clipboard	
1970	On a Clear Day You Can See Forever	Girl in Orphanage	
1970	Move	Myrna	
1970	The Baby Maker	Charlotte	
1972	Portnoy's Complaint	Bubbles Girardi	
1972	Bone	The Girl	
1972	I figli chiedono perché		
1972	The Heartbreak Kid	Lila Kolodny	
1973	Why?	The Junkie	
1975	Sheila Levine Is Dead and Living in New York	Sheila Levine	
1990	In the Spirit	Crystal	Also co-writer
2011	Margaret	Emily	
2013	Vijay and I	Mrs. Korokowski	
2014	Inherent Vice	Aunt Reet	
2016	Café Society	Rose Dorfman	
2018	The Boor		Short film, writer and director
2020	Here After	Goldie	
2022	The Fabelmans	Haddash Fabelman	
2023	You Hurt My Feelings	Georgia	
2023	I'll Be Right There	Grace	
2026	The Bride!	Greta	

=== Television ===
Year	Title	Role	Notes
1969	In Name Only	Heather	Television film
1971	Two on a Bench	Harriet	Television film
1976	Columbo	Janie Brandt	Episode: "Old Fashioned Murder"
2003	Miss Match	Risa Barbeko	Episode: "Matchmaker, Matchmaker"
2016	The Night Of	Helen Weiss	Miniseries
2018	The First	President Cecily Burke	Recurring role, 3 episodes
2019–2023	Succession	Cyd Peach	Recurring role, 8 episodes
2019	SMILF	Lillian Wheaton	Episode: Sh*t Man, I've Literally Failed"
2020–2023	Hunters	Ruth Heidelbaum	Recurring role, 10 episodes

=== Theatre ===
Year	Title	Role	Notes
2005	After the Night and the Music	Joanne/Gail	Biltmore Theatre, Broadway
2012	Other Desert Cities	Silda	Mark Taper Forum

== Awards and nominations ==
Year	Award	Category	Production	Result
1972	National Society of Film Critics Award	Best Supporting Actress	The Heartbreak Kid	Won
1972	New York Film Critics Circle Award	Best Supporting Actress	The Heartbreak Kid	Won
1972	Golden Globe Award	Best Supporting Actress - Motion Picture	The Heartbreak Kid	Nominated
1972	Academy Award	Best Supporting Actress	The Heartbreak Kid	Nominated
2011	Village Voice Film Poll	Best Supporting Actress	Margaret	Won
2011	Boston Society of Film Critics	Best Supporting Actress	Margaret	Nominated
2011	National Society of Film Critics	Best Supporting Actress	Margaret	2nd place
2011	Indiewire Award	Best Supporting Performance	Margaret	3rd place
2023	Screen Actors Guild Award	Outstanding Cast in a Motion Picture	The Fabelmans	Nominated
