= Herb Edelman =

American actor (1933–1996)

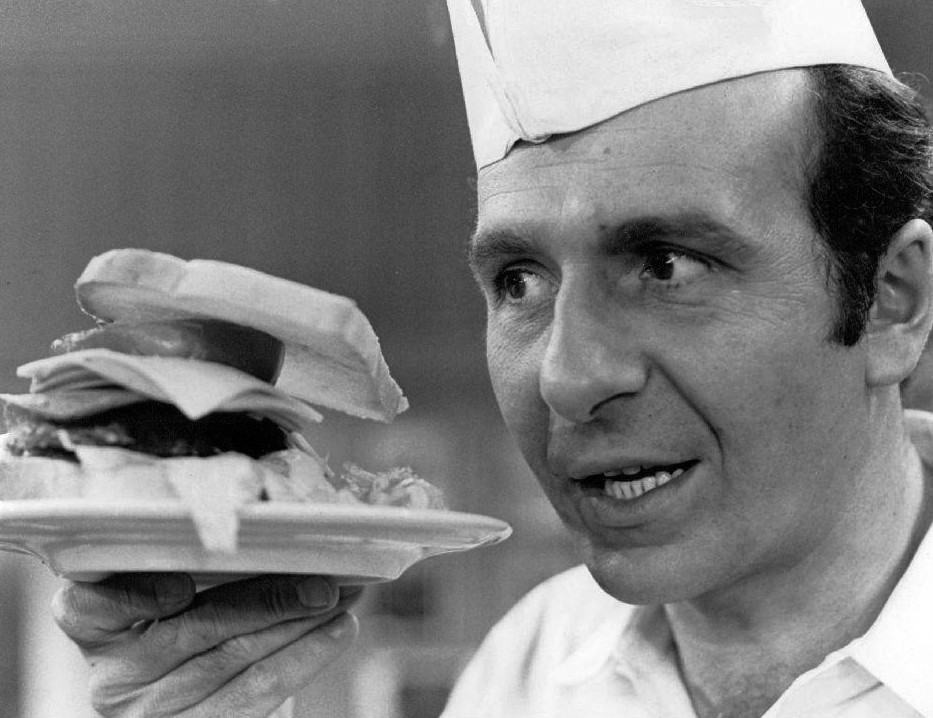
- Edelman as Bert on The Good Guys, 1969
- Born: Herbert Edelman; November 5, 1933; Brooklyn, New York, U.S.
- Died: July 21, 1996 (aged 62); Los Angeles, California, U.S.
- Education: Cornell University
- Occupations: Actor; comedian
- Years active: 1963–1995
- Television: The Golden Girls; The Good Guys; Big John, Little John
- Spouse: Louise Sorel (m. 1964; div. 1970)
- Partners: Merrylin Cosgrove (1971–1984); Christina Pickles (1984–1996, his death)
- Children: 2

Herbert Edelman (November 5, 1933 – July 21, 1996) was an American actor of stage, film and television. He was twice nominated for an Emmy Award for his television work. His best-known role was as Stanley Zbornak, the ex-husband of Dorothy Zbornak (played by Bea Arthur) on The Golden Girls. He also had a recurring role on the 1980s medical drama St. Elsewhere.

== Early life and career ==
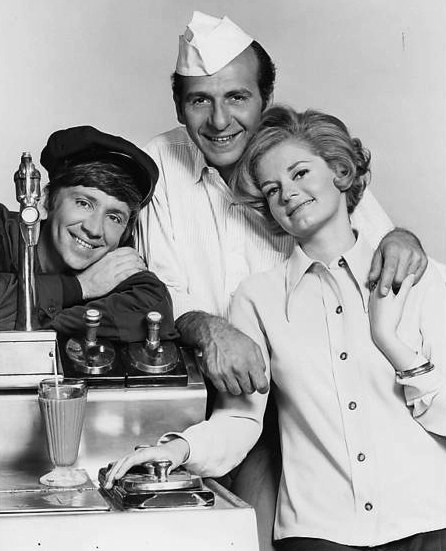
The cast of The Good Guys, 1968: From left: Bob Denver, Edelman and Joyce Van Patten

Edelman was born in Brooklyn, New York, on November 5, 1933. His parents, Jennie (née Greenberg) and Mayer "Mike" Edelman, were Jewish immigrants from Poland and Ukraine, respectively. Before becoming an actor, Edelman studied to become a veterinarian at Cornell University but left during his first year. After serving in the U.S. Army as an announcer for Armed Forces Radio, he enrolled in Brooklyn College as a theater student, but eventually dropped out. He later worked as a hotel manager and as a taxicab driver. One of his fares was director Mike Nichols, who in 1963 cast Edelman in his breakthrough Broadway role, as the bewildered telephone repairman in Neil Simon's Barefoot in the Park. Edelman reprised his role in the 1967 film version (starring Robert Redford and Jane Fonda).

He appeared as Murray the Cop in the movie version of Simon's The Odd Couple (1968) and later appeared in Simon's California Suite (1978). In 1976, in an episode of The Love Boat entitled “Daredevil / Picture Me Spy”, Edelman portrayed a Russian professor at Stanford University. He also had a role in The Way We Were (1973) and in an installment of the Japanese movie series Otoko wa Tsurai yo in 1979.

He remains best known for his three decades in television, usually as a co-star, recurring character, or guest star on CHIPS, The Golden Girls, That Girl, Love, American Style, The Streets of San Francisco, Maude, Cannon, Happy Days, Welcome Back, Kotter, Highway to Heaven, Kojak, Fantasy Island, Cagney & Lacey, and MacGyver, but occasionally in a lead role. In 1976, he starred in the Saturday morning children's series Big John, Little John, as well as The Good Guys with Bob Denver (in what was Denver's first series after Gilligan's Island) from 1968 to 1970.

He also appeared with Bill Bixby and Valerie Perrine in Bruce Jay Friedman's Steambath, a controversial PBS dramedy during 1973. From 1984 to 1988, he had a recurring role on St. Elsewhere. Edelman also appeared in ten episodes of Murder, She Wrote between 1984 and 1995, most frequently appearing as New York Police Department Lieutenant Artie Gelber. His last role was in an episode of Burke's Law.

== Personal life and death ==
Edelman was married to actress Louise Sorel from 1964 to 1970. He had two children with his second wife, Merrilyn (Crosgrove) Saint. He was romantically linked with his St. Elsewhere co-star Christina Pickles from the mid-1980s until his death.

Edelman died of emphysema on July 21, 1996, in Los Angeles at the age of 62. He was interred at Montefiore Cemetery in Springfield Gardens, Queens, New York.

== Filmography ==
=== Film ===
Year	Title	Role	Notes
1967	In Like Flint	Russian Premier	
1967	Barefoot in the Park	Harry Pepper	
1968	P.J.	Charlie	Alternative title: New Face in Hell
1968	I Love You, Alice B. Toklas	Murray	Alternative title: Kiss My Butterfly
1968	The Odd Couple	Murray	
1972	The War Between Men and Women	Howard Mann	
1973	The Way We Were	Bill Verso	
1974	The Front Page	Schwartz	Credited as Herbert Edelman
1974	The Yakuza	Wheat	Alternative title: Brotherhood of the Yakuza
1975	Hearts of the West	Polo	Alternative title: Hollywood Cowboy
1976	Smash-Up on Interstate 5	Danny	TV movie
1977	Charge of the Model T's	Villa Nueva	
1978	Goin' Coconuts	Sid	
1978	California Suite	Harry Michaels	
1979	Tora-san's Dream of Spring	Michael Jordan	24th entry in the Japanese Otoko wa Tsurai yo series
1981	On the Right Track	Sam	
1983	Cracking Up	Dr. Jonas Pletchick	
1984	Wheels on Meals	Matt Henry	
1992	The Naked Truth	Rupert Hess	Credited as Herbert Edelman
1995	Cops n Roberts		(final film role)

=== Television ===
Year	Title	Role	Notes
1964	The Reporter	Benny	Episode: "How Much for a Prince?"
1965	The Nurses	Marco	Episode: "The Witnesses"
1965	Honey West	Moody	Episode: "Live a Little... Kill a Little"
1966	Hey, Landlord	Garvin	Episode: "The Long Hot Bus"
1966	Occasional Wife	Uncle Harry	Episode: "Marriage Counselor"
1966	That Girl	Eddie	Episode: "Time for Arrest"
1967	The Girl from U.N.C.L.E.	Mr. Asterick	Episode: "The Furnace Flats Affair"
1967	Bob Hope Presents the Chrysler Theatre	Seth Swine	Episode: "The Reason Nobody Hardly Ever Seen a Fat Outlaw in the Old West Is as Follows"
1967	Accidental Family	Howard	Episode: "If You Knew Martha"
1967	The Flying Nun	Albion "Al" Caine	Episode: "Ah Love, Could You and I Conspire?"
1968–1970	The Good Guys	Bert Gramus	42 episodes
1971	The Bill Cosby Show	Mr. Maher	Episode: "Tobacco Road"
1971	Bewitched	Col. Bringham	Episode: "This Little Piggie"
1971	McMillan & Wife	Gregory Constantine	Episode: "Once Upon a Dead Man"
1971	Mission: Impossible	Frank Mason	Episode: "Run for the Money"
1972	Banacek	Joe Taddenhurst	Episode: "Project Phoenix"
1972	Banyon	Harry Sprague	Episode: "Pilot"
1972	The Bold Ones: The New Doctors	Howard Feinstein	Episode: "A Quality of Fear"
1972	Temperatures Rising	Dr. Patterson	Episode: "RX: Christmas"
1973	Ironside	David Wollens	Episode: "Murder by One"
1973	The New Dick Van Dyke Show	George Benson	Episode: "One of the Boys"
1973	The Partridge Family	Darby Willis	Episode: "The Strike-Out King"
1973	The Streets of San Francisco	Lou	Episode: "The Twenty-Four Karat Plague"
1974	Hawkins	Lt. Horowitz	Episode: "Murder on the Thirteenth Floor"
1974	Maude	Woody	Episode: "Maude the Boss"
1974	The Strange and Deadly Occurrence	Mr. Felix	—
1975	Happy Days	Burglar	Episode: "The Cunningham Caper"
1975	Barney Miller	Alan Schuster	Episode: "The Guest"
1975	Medical Center	Brannigan	Episode: "Gift from a Killer"
1976	Jigsaw John	Lieutenant Hill	Episode: "Sand Trap"
1976	Big John Little John	Big John Martin	13 episodes
1977	Blansky's Beauties	Sindu	2 episodes
1977	Quinn Martin's Tales of the Unexpected	Don Lucas	Episode: "You're Not Alone"
1977	The San Pedro Beach Bums	Schwann	Episode: "The Angels and the Bums"
1978	CHiPs	Sanders	Episode: "Rainy Day"
1978	Chico and the Man	Doctor	Episode: "The Hot Rock"
1978	Charlie's Angels	Joey January	Episode: "Angels in Vegas"
1979	The MacKenzies of Paradise Cove	Big Jim	2 episodes
1980–1981	Ladies' Man	Reggie	16 episodes
1981–1982	Strike Force	Commissioner Herb Klein	20 episodes
1982–1983	Nine to Five	Harry Nussbaum	8 episodes
1984	Trapper John, M.D.	Dr. Haller	Episode: "A Little Knife Music"
1984-1988	St. Elsewhere	Richard Clarendon	17 episodes
1984–1995	Murder, She Wrote	Lieutenant Artie Gelber, and others	10 episodes
1985	The Fall Guy	Hal Vargas movie producer	Episode: "Reel Trouble"
1985	The Paper Chase	Dr. Arnie Samuels	Episode: "The Big D"
1985	Highway to Heaven	Dr. Cohn	2 episodes
1985	Hardcastle and McCormick	Harry Baxter	Episode: "Games People Play"
1985–1992	The Golden Girls	Stan Zbornak	26 episodes
1987	Matlock	Arthur Rydell	Episode: "The Rat Pack"
1988	Beauty and the Beast	Harold Levinson	Episode: "Temptation"
1989	The Famous Teddy Z	Lassister Fogel	Episode: "The Dark Closet"
1989	Out of This World	Stanley Mansfield	Episode: "Hair Today, Gone Tomorrow"
1989–1990	thirtysomething	Murray Steadman	2 episodes
1990	The Bradys	Gene Dickinson	2 episodes
1990	Knots Landing	Sergeant Levine	5 episodes
1991	MacGyver	Gorman	Episode: "Faith, Hope and Charity"
1992	Batman: The Animated Series	Stern	2 episodes
1992–1993	L.A. Law	Judge Al Jones	2 episodes
1993	The Golden Palace	Stanley Zbornak	Episode: "One Angry Stan"
1994	The Mommies	Therapist	Episode: "The Exercist"

== Award nominations ==
Year	Association	Category	Nominated work	Result
1987	Primetime Emmy Awards	Outstanding Guest Actor in a Comedy Series	The Golden Girls	Nominated
1988	Primetime Emmy Awards	Outstanding Guest Actor in a Comedy Series	The Golden Girls	Nominated
