= List of The Bob Cummings Show episodes =

The Bob Cummings Show (also known as Love That Bob) is an American sitcom starring Robert "Bob" Cummings which was produced from January 2, 1955 to September 15, 1959. The episodes listed below are based on several references.

== Series overview ==
Season	Episodes	Originally released	
Season	Episodes	First released	Last released
1	28	January 2, 1955	July 28, 1955
2	37	September 22, 1955	June 21, 1956
3	34	October 4, 1956	June 6, 1957
4	36	September 24, 1957	June 17, 1958
5	38	September 23, 1958	July 7, 1959

== Episodes ==
=== Season 1 (1955) ===
No. overall	No. in season	Title	Directed by	Written by	Original release date
1	1	"Calling Doctor Baxter"	Fred de Cordova	Paul Henning	January 2, 1955
Bob uses "glamour photos" to find Margaret a husband.
2	2	"Hiring a Receptionist"	Unknown	Unknown	January 9, 1955
Bob is having problems getting a receptionist; Schultzy keeps turning away all beautiful applicants.
3	3	"It's Later Than You Think"	Rod Amateau	Unknown	January 16, 1955
Bob, worried about a lonely old age, considers taking that most drastic of steps: marriage.
4	4	"Chuck Falls for His English Teacher"	Unknown	Unknown	January 23, 1955
Chuck's announcement: he's in love with his English teacher.
5	5	"Bob Becomes a Genius"	Rod Amateau	Unknown	January 30, 1955
Bob has his hands full photographing a temperamental movie star.
6	6	"A Date for Margaret"	Rod Amateau	Unknown	February 6, 1955
Bob tries to get Margaret to start dating again.
7	7	"Bob Gives Up Girls"	Unknown	Unknown	February 13, 1955
To set a good example for Chuck, Bob makes the ultimate sacrifice: he gives up chasing girls.
8	8	"The Eyes of Texas"	Unknown	Unknown	February 20, 1955
A rich client's girl friend means trouble for Bob
9	9	"The Girl from France"	Rod Amateau	Unknown	February 27, 1955
Bob's long-forgotten promise to a French girl returns to haunt him.
10	10	"Ideal Husband"	Unknown	Unknown	March 6, 1955
Bob an ideal mate? Two disgruntled wives believe it—and are ready to leave their husbands to prove it.
11	11	"The Rival Photographer"	Rod Amateau	Unknown	March 13, 1955
Bob clashes with a rival photographer.
12	12	"Bachelor Apartment"	Rod Amateau	Unknown	March 20, 1955
Trouble begins when Bob moves into a bachelor apartment.
13	13	"Mrs. Montague's Niece"	Unknown	Unknown	March 27, 1955
Mrs. Montague is determined to get Bob married—to her niece.
14	14	"Dr. Jekyll and Mr. Cummings"	Rod Amateau	Unknown	April 3, 1955
Bob campaigns to get a magazine's cover-photo assignment. Bob Cummings appears as himself.
15	15	"Bob to the Rescue or Unhand My Sister, You Cad"	Rod Amateau	Unknown	April 10, 1955
Bob schemes to discourage an old friend—and notable wolf—from dating Margaret.
16	16	"The Air Corps vs. Marriage"	Rod Amateau	Unknown	April 17, 1955
Bob's buddies hatch a plot to get the carefree bachelor married.
17	17	"Advice to the Lovelorn"	Unknown	Unknown	April 24, 1955
Bob gives Chuck pointers in winning a girl's affections.
18	18	"Choosing Miss Coffee Break"	Rod Amateau	Unknown	May 1, 1955
Bob is asked to judge a beauty contest where the prize is a week of dates with Bob Cummings.
19	19	"A Boyfriend for Schultzy"	Unknown	Unknown	May 8, 1955
Bob gets Schultzy a date: a girl-shy soda jerk.
20	20	"Schultzy's Dream World"	Unknown	Unknown	May 15, 1955
Schultzy gives a glowing account of a recent date... with Bob.
21	21	"Bob Plays Cupid"	Unknown	Unknown	May 22, 1955
Bob plays matchmaker for Margaret and a city-council candidate.
22	22	"Uncle Bob-Bob"	Rod Amateau	Unknown	May 29, 1955
Bob is saddled with unwelcome house guests.
23	23	"The Silver-Tongued Orator"	Rod Amateau	Paul Henning, Bill Manhoff	June 5, 1955
Bob bets that he can charm Mrs. Neeymeyer into renting a house.
24	24	"Bob's Birthday"	Rod Amateau	Unknown	June 12, 1955
Bob tells friends that he is too old for a birthday party. The surprise: they believe him.
25	25	"The Return of the Wolf or Absence Makes the Heart Grow Fonda"	Rod Amateau	Paul Henning, Bill Manhoff	June 19, 1955
Bob, wanting to go fishing, angles for a tactful way to get rid of his friend Paul.
26	26	"El Lobo Strikes Again"	Unknown	Unknown	June 26, 1955
Bob tries to fend off Paul, a wolf who has eyes for Margaret.
27	27	"Chuck Goes Hollywood"	Unknown	Unknown	July 7, 1955
Chuck's picture turns up on a magazine cover.
28	28	"Bob Glamorizes Schultzy"	Rod Amateau	Unknown	July 28, 1955
Schultzy glamorous? A magazine picture prompts Bob to try to turn the trick.

=== Season 2 (1955–56) ===
No. overall	No. in season	Title	Directed by	Written by	Original release date
29	1	"Bob Rescues Mrs. Neimeyer"	Rod Amateau	Unknown	September 22, 1955
It's Bob to the rescue when Mrs. Neimeyer gets engaged to a fortune-hunting Frenchman.
30	2	"Bob Saves the Day"	Rod Amateau	Unknown	September 29, 1955
Bob and Margaret try to keep Schultzy's boy friend away from other girls.
31	3	"Bob Meets Fonda's Sister"	Unknown	Unknown	October 6, 1955
Tired of Bob's overprotective meddling, Margaret decides to show him the error of his ways.
32	4	"Too Many Cooks"	Unknown	Unknown	October 13, 1955
Bob and Chuck are left to care for the house while Margaret vacations.
33	5	"Bob Falls in Love"	Unknown	Unknown	October 20, 1955
Perennial bachelor Bob shows every sign of being in love... with Kay.
34	6	"Hawaii Calls"	Unknown	Unknown	October 27, 1955
Bob sees green when Jack Carson shows an interest in Kay Michaels.
35	7	"Hawaii Comes Calling"	Unknown	Unknown	November 3, 1955
Bob has romantic problems in Hawaii.
36	8	"Hawaii Stays"	Paul Henning	Unknown	November 10, 1955
Bob comes up with a sure-fire plan to get rid of his Hawaiian "fiancee."
37	9	"Wedding, Wedding Who's Having the Wedding?"	Paul Henning	Unknown	November 17, 1955
Bob and Kay plan to get Paul and Margaret married off while Paul and Margaret try to do the same for them.
38	10	"Bob's One Day to Relax"	Paul Henning	Unknown	November 24, 1955
Latest Collins concern: Chuck's romance with an exchange student.
39	11	"Bob Avoids Another Niece"	Rod Amateau	Paul Henning, William Cowley	December 1, 1955
Bob runs himself ragged trying to avoid a starry-eyed teenager.
40	12	"The Wolf Sitter"	Rod Amateau	Paul Henning, William Cowley, Shirley Gordon	December 8, 1955
Chuck's latest business venture hinders Bob's romantic activities.
41	13	"The Christmas Spirit"	Rod Amateau	Paul Henning, William Cowley, Shirley Gordon	December 15, 1955
Bob solves everyone's romantic problems but his own.
42	14	"Grandpa's Christmas Visit"	Rod Amateau	Paul Henning, William Cowley, Shirley Gordon	December 22, 1955
Grandpa Collins keeps the whole family jumping during a Christmas visit.
43	15	"The Sheik"	Rod Amateau	Paul Henning, William Cowley, Shirley Gordon	December 29, 1955
Bob glamorizes Pamela and Schultzy dreams Bob is a Sheik who has come to rescue her.
44	16	"The Letter"	Unknown	Unknown	January 5, 1956
A letter from Kay carries first-class problems for Bob.
45	17	"The School Play"	Unknown	Paul Henning	January 12, 1956
Bob gives Chuck tips on romance.
46	18	"Bob Joins the Drama Group"	Unknown	Paul Henning	January 19, 1956
It's curtains for Bob, who's being forced to perform in a play.
47	19	"The Acid Test"	Unknown	Paul Henning	January 26, 1956
How faithful is a girl friend? Bob's buddy intends to find out... by using Bob as a test.
48	20	"The Dominant Sex"	Rod Amateau	Unknown	February 2, 1956
Bob woos an Italian actress.
49	21	"Too Many Women"	Unknown	Paul Henning	February 9, 1956
Bob, fed up with women, leaves for an isolated cabin in the mountains.
50	22	"Snowbound"	Unknown	Unknown	February 16, 1956
Bob and Paul Fonda are snowed in at a mountain cabin without food... or women.
51	23	"Long Live the King"	Unknown	Unknown	February 23, 1956
Bob gets snarled up in a matrimonial trap.
52	24	"The Petticoat Derby"	Unknown	Unknown	March 1, 1956
Bob's model finds that it's no snap getting him to attend a photographer's ball.
53	25	"The Fallen Idol"	Unknown	Unknown	March 8, 1956
Bob discovers that he's a fallen idol around the house.
54	26	"The Wolf Who Came for Dinner"	Unknown	Unknown	March 15, 1956
Paul Fonda stays with the Collinses.
55	27	"Hail to Thee, O Alma Mater"	Unknown	Unknown	March 22, 1956
Bob and Margaret differ on which college Chuck should attend.
56	28	"Chuck Visits Grandpa"	Unknown	Unknown	March 29, 1956
Troubles trail Bob to Joplin, Mo., where he renews an old acquaintanceship.
57	29	"The Con Man"	Unknown	Unknown	April 5, 1956
Margaret considers investing her life savings in uranium stock.
58	30	"The Trouble with Henry"	Rod Amateau	Paul Henning, William Cowley, Shirley Gordon	April 12, 1956
Bob tries to smooth out a friend's in-law problems.
59	31	"The Air Force vs. the Navy"	Unknown	Unknown	April 26, 1956
Bob, an old Air Force man, gets that sinking feeling when Chuck decides to enlist in the Navy.
60	32	"The Boys Join Up"	Unknown	Unknown	May 3, 1956
Chuck learns that he is too short to become a pilot.
61	33	"The Sergeant Wore Skirts"	Unknown	Unknown	May 10, 1956
Bob runs interference for Harvey, whose old flame is coming to town.
62	34	"Scramble for Grandpa"	Rod Amateau	Paul Henning, Phil Shuken, Shirley Gordon	May 24, 1956
Grandpa Collins has the Air Force hopping: he's flying his old crate without a flight plan.
63	35	"Masquerade Party"	Unknown	Unknown	May 31, 1956
Triple trouble: Bob has three dates for the same masquerade party.
64	36	"Bob the Chaperone"	Unknown	Paul Henning	June 14, 1956
Trouble begins when Chuck enlists Bob's help as a chaperone.
65	37	"Margaret Becomes Sadie Thompson"	Rod Amateau	Paul Henning, Phil Shuken, Shirley Gordon	June 21, 1956
Margaret a sex symbol? Bob tries to turn the trick.

=== Season 3 (1956–57) ===
No. overall	No. in season	Title	Directed by	Written by	Original release date
66	1	"Grandpa Meets Zsa Zsa"	Rod Amateau	Paul Henning, Phil Shuken, Shirley Gordon	October 4, 1956
Zsa Zsa Gabor mistakes Grandpa Collins for Bob.
67	2	"Bob Buys a Plane"	Unknown	Unknown	October 11, 1956
Bob considers using the money in his trust fund to buy a plane.
68	3	"Bob Batches It"	Unknown	Paul Henning	October 18, 1956
Bob tries to get his dates to do the housework.
69	4	"The Beautiful Psychologist"	Norman Tokar	Paul Henning, Phil Shuken, Shirley Gordon	October 25, 1956
Bob's headache: how to look less like a hero to nephew Chuck.
70	5	"The Boston Mother Returns"	Unknown	Paul Henning	November 1, 1956
To fool a mother-in-law, Bob poses as husband Henry Evans.
71	6	"Miss Joplin Arrives"	Rod Amateau	Unknown	November 8, 1956
Bob escorts a teen-age beauty-contest winner on a tour of Hollywood.
72	7	"Double Date"	Norman Tokar	Paul Henning, Phil Shuken, Shirley Gordon	November 15, 1956
Bob, making a date with a stripper, forgot he promised to double date with Chuck on his 18th birthday.
73	8	"Schultzy Says No"	Norman Tokar	Paul Henning, Phil Shuken, Shirley Gordon	November 22, 1956
Bob tries to discourage Schultzy's romantic notions about him. Schultzy turns down Frank's marriage proposal.
74	9	"Chuck Buys a Hot Rod"	Unknown	Unknown	November 29, 1956
Bob suspects that Chuck is planning to elope.
75	10	"The Air Force vs. Ruthie"	Unknown	Unknown	December 6, 1956
The appearance of models at an Air Force reunion means trouble for Bob and Harvey.
76	11	"How to Handle Women"	Norman Tokar	Unknown	December 13, 1956
Bob helps Chuck map out a campaign to attract a certain girl.
77	12	"Bob Uncovers Ruthie's Past"	Unknown	Unknown	December 27, 1956
Harvey needs help after he is trapped into a luncheon date with an old flame.
78	13	"Bob Traps a Wolf"	Norman Tokar	Paul Henning, Phil Shuken, Shirley Gordon	January 3, 1957
Bob tabs Paul as the perfect man to marry Margaret.
79	14	"Eleven Angry Women (aka Beach Bandit)"	Norman Tokar	Paul Henning, Phil Shuken, Shirley Gordon	January 10, 1957
Bob's not enthusiastic about serving on a jury... until he sizes up the woman on trial.
80	15	"Bob Gives Pamela the Bird"	Robert Cummings	Unknown	January 17, 1957
Bird watcher Pamela Livingston decides that Bob would make the perfect husband.
81	16	"The Model's Revolt"	Unknown	Unknown	January 24, 1957
Bob's models revolt against his double-dating shenanigans.
82	17	"Bob Saves Doctor Chuck"	Robert Cummings	Unknown	January 31, 1957
Chuck considers dropping his pre-med studies.
83	18	"Bob Becomes Chuck's First Patient"	Unknown	Unknown	February 7, 1957
Bob fakes injury to convince Chuck to become a doctor.
84	19	"Bob Tangles with Ruthie"	Unknown	Unknown	February 14, 1957
Bob interferes in Ruthie and Harvey's marriage.
85	20	"Bob Picks a College"	Rod Amateau	Paul Henning, William Cowley, Shirley Gordon	February 21, 1957
Bob and Margaret lock horns over the college Chuck should attend.
86	21	"Chuck at College"	Robert Cummings	Paul Henning, Phil Shuken, Dick Wesson, Shirley Gordon	February 28, 1957
Chuck finds it difficult living up to his uncle's reputation with women.
87	22	"Bob Clashes with His Landlady"	Unknown	Unknown	March 7, 1957
Bob's landlady threatens him with eviction unless he stops bringing models into the apartment.
88	23	"Bob Meets Schultzy's Cousin"	Unknown	Unknown	March 14, 1957
Bonita Granville guest stars as Schultzy's visiting cousin.
89	24	"Bob Meets the Mortons"	Robert Cummings	Paul Henning, Phil Shuken, Dick Wesson, Shirley Gordon	March 21, 1957
Gracie Allen and Blanche Morton try to get Bob and Schultzy romantically involved.
90	25	"Bob Handles the College Boys"	Unknown	Unknown	March 28, 1957
Bob's job: convincing Chuck that he's acting too sophisticated for his age.
91	26	"Bob Escapes Schultzy's Trap"	Unknown	Unknown	April 4, 1957
Determined to make Bob jealous, Schultzy invents a mythical admirer.
92	27	"Bob Plays Gigolo"	Unknown	Unknown	April 11, 1957
Bob's latest love interest: wealthy Kay Van Lockett
93	28	"Bob's Economy Wave"	Unknown	Unknown	April 18, 1957
At income-tax time Bob puts the family on a strict budget.
94	29	"Bob Meets Miss Sweden"	Robert Cummings	Paul Henning, Phil Shuken, Dick Wesson, Shirley Gordon	April 25, 1957
Bob agrees to take Schultzy and her secretary friends to a convention after finding out that Miss Sweden will be there.
95	30	"Bob Enters a Photography Contest"	Unknown	Unknown	May 2, 1957
Trouble develops when Margaret hires a rival photographer.
96	31	"Bob Goes Fishing, Gets Caught"	Unknown	Unknown	May 9, 1957
Kay Michaels returns.
97	32	"Bob Calls Kay's Bluff"	Unknown	Unknown	May 16, 1957
Bob decides to play along with Kay.
98	33	"Bob Ages Margaret"	Unknown	Unknown	May 23, 1957
The gang considers giving a birthday party for Margaret, who's age conscious.
99	34	"Bob Gets Out-Uncled"	Unknown	Unknown	June 6, 1957
Like uncle, like nephew: Chuck is throwing all his energies into one hobby, chasing girls.

=== Season 4 (1957–58) ===
No. overall	No. in season	Title	Directed by	Written by	Original release date
100	1	"Air Force Calls Bob - Grandpa Answers"	Unknown	Unknown	September 24, 1957
Bob's problem: dating Miss Sweden at the same time that he's supposed to report for Air Force duty.
101	2	"Bob Gets Schultzy Into Pictures"	Unknown	Unknown	October 1, 1957
Schultzy's in a panic over a visit from a girl friend who thinks that Schultzy is a movie star.
102	3	"Bob Gets Neighborly"	Robert Cummings	Paul Henning, Dick Wesson, Shirley Gordon	October 8, 1957
Bob takes more than a friendly interest in his new next-door neighbor, a beautiful blonde.
103	4	"Bob for Mayor"	Unknown	Unknown	October 15, 1957
Bob gets the notion that he's being groomed as a mayoral candidate.
104	5	"Bob Hires a Maid"	Unknown	Unknown	October 22, 1957
While Margaret is away, Bob hires a maid... and what a maid!
105	6	"Bob Slows Down"	Robert Cummings	Paul Henning, Dick Wesson, Shirley Gordon	October 29, 1957
Margaret and a doctor conspire to get Bob to slow down a little.
106	7	"Bob the Body Builder"	Robert Cummings	Paul Henning, Dick Wesson, Shirley Gordon	November 12, 1957
Bob isn't thrilled about taking publicity pictures of gymnasium equipment.
107	8	"Bob Meets Bill Lear"	Robert Cummings	Paul Henning, Dick Wesson, Shirley Gordon	November 19, 1957
Bob tries to arrange a date between Margaret and his friend Bill Lear, an aviation inventor.
108	9	"Thanksgiving at Grandpa's"	Unknown	Unknown	November 26, 1957
Bob's choice: Thanksgiving dinner at Grandpa's or a date with a model.
109	10	"Bob Wins the Olympics"	Unknown	Unknown	December 3, 1957
Bob's landlady again doesn't approve of the many women visiting Bob's office.
110	11	"Bob the Gunslinger"	Robert Cummings	Unknown	December 10, 1957
In a dream sequence, Schultzy imagines herself a glamorous senorita in the Old West.
111	12	"Bob and the New Receptionist"	Unknown	Unknown	December 17, 1957
Suspicion is what ails Bob after Margaret goes to work for a doctor.
112	13	"Bob's Christmas Party"	Unknown	Unknown	December 24, 1957
Chaos erupts at Bob's Christmas party.
113	14	"Bob Gives Psychology Lessons"	Unknown	Unknown	December 31, 1957
Bob gives Margaret some psychological pointers in handling Chuck.
114	15	"Bob and Harvey Go Hunting"	Unknown	Unknown	January 7, 1958
Bob and Harvey scheme to keep their hunting trip secret.
115	16	"Bob and Harvey Get Ambushed"	Unknown	Unknown	January 14, 1958
It's one long trail of trouble when a couple of models join Bob and Harvey on a hunting trip.
116	17	"Bob, the Gorilla Trainer"	Robert Cummings	Unknown	January 21, 1958
Bob tries to finesse his way out of flying Margaret's friends to a bridge tournament.
117	18	"Bob Goes Hillbilly"	Robert Cummings	Paul Henning, Dick Wesson, Shirley Gordon	January 28, 1958
Bob, Margaret and Schultzy help Chuck handle a snobbish débutante.
118	19	"Bob Falls for Schultzy"	Unknown	Unknown	February 4, 1958
Schultzy uses the power of suggestion to get Bob interested in her.
119	20	"Bob's Italian Past"	Unknown	Unknown	February 11, 1958
Bob tries to rekindle a wartime romance with an Italian girl.
120	21	"Bob's Italian Past Moves In"	Unknown	Unknown	February 18, 1958
It's Bob vs. Paul for the affections of Rosa Conti.
121	22	"Bob and Automation"	Unknown	Unknown	February 25, 1958
Bob turns to automation to make his photography business click.
122	23	"Bob Gives SRO Performance"	Unknown	Unknown	March 4, 1958
Margaret tries to talk Bob into playing the lead in a charity show.
123	24	"Bob Gets Harvey a Raise"	Robert Cummings	Paul Henning, Dick Wesson, Shirley Gordon	March 11, 1958
It's a chaotic series of mistaken identities after Bob impersonates Harvey.
124	25	"Bob Saves Harvey"	Unknown	Unknown	March 18, 1958
To save a business deal, Bob must impersonate Harvey—and hope he doesn't run into Harvey's wife.
125	26	"Bob Goes Birdwatching"	Robert Cummings	Paul Henning, Dick Wesson, Shirley Gordon	March 25, 1958
Pamela Livingston tries to get Bob to go bird-watching.
126	27	"Bob Goes to the Moon"	Robert Cummings	Paul Henning, Dick Wesson, Shirley Gordon	April 1, 1958
To impress a girl, Bob tells her that he's an astronaut.
127	28	"Bob Retrenches"	Robert Cummings	Paul Henning, Dick Wesson, Shirley Gordon	April 8, 1958
Bob gives everyone gifts when he thinks he's to get a big tax break.
128	29	"Bob Sails for Hawaii"	Robert Cummings	Paul Henning, Dick Wesson, Shirley Gordon	April 22, 1958
Bob and Wally Seawell vie for the affections of Miss Sweden.
129	30	"Bob and Schultzy at Sea"	Robert Cummings	Paul Henning, Dick Wesson, Shirley Gordon	April 29, 1958
Don Knotts plays "Flash" Gruskin, the new man in Schultzy's life.
130	31	"Grandpa Attends the Convention"	Robert Cummings	Paul Henning, Dick Wesson, Shirley Gordon	May 6, 1958
Grandpa attends a convention... and makes a play for Miss Sweden.
131	32	"Grandpa's Old Buddy"	Edward Rubin	Paul Henning, Dick Wesson, Shirley Gordon	May 13, 1958
Grandpa's old buddy helps him out of a romantic dilemma.
132	33	"Bob Digs Rock'N'Roll"	Robert Cummings	Paul Henning, Dick Wesson, Shirley Gordon	May 27, 1958
Bob and Chuck as rock and rollers? That's the price if they want to compete with their girl friends' singing idol.
133	34	"Colonel Goldbrick"	Unknown	Unknown	June 3, 1958
Bob wants to spend more time in the Air Force when he learns a pretty girl will be there.
134	35	"Bob Frees Schultzy for Romance"	Unknown	Unknown	June 10, 1958
Determined to wed, Schultzy goes to work where there are more men—thousands more.
135	36	"Bob's Forgotten Fiancée"	Robert Cummings	Paul Henning, Dick Wesson, Shirley Gordon	June 17, 1958
Bob's friends hatch another plot to get him married.

=== Season 5 (1958–59) ===
No. overall	No. in season	Title	Directed by	Written by	Original release date
136	1	"Bob and Schultzy Reunite"	Robert Cummings	Paul Henning, Dick Wesson	September 23, 1958
Bob's replacement for Schultzy: a very shapely—and dumb—blonde
137	2	"Bob and the Dumb Blonde"	Robert Cummings	Paul Henning, Dick Wesson	September 30, 1958
Schultzy tries to distract Bob's attention in his temporary secretary.
138	3	"Bob Helps Anna Maria"	Robert Cummings	Paul Henning, Dick Wesson	October 7, 1958
Bob's not enthusiastic about photographing Anna Maria Alberghetti, whom he recalls as a "skinny kid."
139	4	"Bob Restores Male Supremacy"	Robert Cummings	Paul Henning	October 21, 1958
Bob tries to help henpecked Harvey Helm come out from under his wife's thumb.
140	5	"Bob and the Ravishing Realtor"	Robert Cummings	Paul Henning, Dick Wesson	October 28, 1958
A pretty real-estate agent talks Bob into selling his house.
141	6	"Grandpa Clobbers the Air Force"	Unknown	Paul Henning	November 11, 1958
Grandpa bombs the base because they won't let him re-enlist.
142	7	"Bob in Orbit"	Robert Cummings	Paul Henning, Dick Wesson	November 18, 1958
Bob gets into trouble when Grandpa attacks the base.
143	8	"Bob Becomes a Stage Uncle"	Unknown	Lawrence Menkin	November 25, 1958
Bob tries to persuade Chuck not to be a rock 'n' roll singer.
144	9	"Bob Butters Beck, Beck Butters Better"	Robert Cummings	Paul Henning, Dick Wesson	December 2, 1958
Margaret wants Bob to promote Chuck's first rock 'n' roll record.
145	10	"Collins the Crooner"	Robert Cummings	Paul Henning, Dick Wesson	December 9, 1958
Collins a crooner? The rumor is that Bob is making a record album.
146	11	"Bob Judges a Beauty Pageant"	Robert Cummings	Paul Henning, Dick Wesson	December 16, 1958
Bob tries to get Peter Lawford to judge a beauty contest.
147	12	"Bob Plays Margaret's Game"	Robert Cummings	Paul Henning, Dick Wesson	December 23, 1958
Bob schemes to be alone with a beautiful model.
148	13	"Grandpa Moves West"	Robert Cummings	Paul Henning, Dick Wesson	December 30, 1958
Bob hears that Grandpa is spending a lot of time with a lady acrobat, so he travels to Missouri to end the romance.
149	14	"Bob's Boyhood Love Image"	Robert Cummings	Paul Henning, Shirley Gordon	January 6, 1959
Schultzy tries to lure Bob with psychology.
150	15	"Bob the Ideal Boss"	Unknown	Unknown	January 13, 1959
Schultzy enters a "What I Think of My Boss" contest.
151	16	"Bob Clashes with Steve Allen"	Unknown	Unknown	January 20, 1959
Bob tries to pull a few strings to get a beautiful, but dumb, blonde on guest Steve Allen's show.
152	17	"Bob vs. Linkletter"	Unknown	Unknown	January 27, 1959
Bob tries to talk Art Linkletter into emceeing a benefit.
153	18	"Bob Meets Mamie Van Doren"	Robert Cummings	Paul Henning, Dick Wesson	February 3, 1959
Schultzy helps Mamie become less attractive to Bob so Mamie can more easily gain some secretarial experience.
154	19	"Bob, the Babysitter"	Unknown	Unknown	February 17, 1959
Bob has a date with a model... if he can duck a baby-sitting job.
155	20	"Bob Seeks a Wife"	Robert Cummings	Paul Henning, Dick Wesson	February 24, 1959
Bob and Grandpa compete for the affections of little Tammy.
156	21	"Bob Buys a Dog"	Unknown	Unknown	March 3, 1959
Chaos ensues when Bob brings a puppy into the Collins house.
157	22	"Bob, the Matchmaker"	Unknown	Unknown	March 10, 1959
Bob once again tries to promote a romance for Margaret.
158	23	"Bob Gets Zodiac-ed"	Unknown	Unknown	March 17, 1959
Bob feigns an interest in astrology to get closer to a heavenly looking singing star.
159	24	"Bob Goes Western"	Unknown	Unknown	March 24, 1959
Guest star George Montgomery tells Tammy that Bob is an excellent horseman.
160	25	"Bob in Surgery"	Unknown	Unknown	March 31, 1959
Bob's girl trouble: choosing between two pretty nurses.
161	26	"Bob Tangles with Engel"	Unknown	Unknown	April 7, 1959
To impress a seagoing widow, Bob develops a liking for all things nautical.
162	27	"Bob Goes to Sea"	Unknown	Unknown	April 14, 1959
It's a knotty problem when landlubber Bob is forced to take a short cruise.
163	28	"Bob and the Ballet"	Unknown	Unknown	April 21, 1959
Bob tries to get out of a photo assignment at the ballet.
164	29	"Bob and the Ballerina"	Unknown	Unknown	May 5, 1959
Bob puts his worst foot forward trying to woo a ballerina.
165	30	"Grandpa Strikes Oil"	Unknown	Unknown	May 12, 1959
Grandpa has his own slick ideas on how to celebrate his oil strike.
166	31	"Grandpa Runs Away"	Unknown	Unknown	May 19, 1959
Grandpa tries to show how important he is to the Collins household.
167	32	"Bob Helps Martha"	Unknown	Unknown	May 26, 1959
Bob plays matchmaker for Harry Von Zell and Schultzy's friend Martha.
168	33	"Bob Helps Von Zell"	Unknown	Unknown	June 2, 1959
Guest star George Burns tries to promote a romance between Harry Von Zell and Martha, Schultzy's friend.
169	34	"Bob and the Pediatrician"	Robert Cummings	Paul Henning, Dick Wesson	June 9, 1959
Bob dates Tammy's beautiful pediatrician who, Bob learns, is also dating Bob's family physician.
170	35	"Bob Gets Hypnotized"	Robert Cummings	Paul Henning, Dick Wesson	June 16, 1959
Bob believes he proposed to a beautiful pediatrician after being hypnotized.
171	36	"Bob, the Last Bachelor"	Unknown	Unknown	June 23, 1959
Bob's worry: his friends all seem to be drifting toward marriage.
172	37	"The King vs. the Chorus Girl"	Unknown	Unknown	June 30, 1959
Chaos breaks loose when Chuck brings home a chorus girl
173	38	"Bob Clashes with Ken"	Unknown	Unknown	July 7, 1959
Ken Murray is worried that his show girls are keeping late hours—with Bob
