= Thonnis Calhoun =

American writer of plays, radio programs, and television shows (1917–1965)

Thonnis Watson Calhoun (1917–1965) was an American writer of plays, radio programs, and television shows.

== Biography ==
Calhoun attended Central High School in Houston, Texas. He was in the Navy.

Calhoun earned a bachelor of fine arts degree from the University of Texas. He performed in a play for the college's Experimental Theater in 1947. While he was a sophomore in 1948, his political satire Josephine was produced.

He was involved in theatre in Houston. He submitted a script to Elliott Lewis of the radio show On Stage; Lewis called Calhoun in the middle of the night to express his interest. The script was produced as the episode "Canary Yellow". He wrote other scripts for radio and television in the 1950s.

Thonnis Calhoun died of a brain tumor at Sawtelle Veterans' Hospital in Los Angeles in 1965. Calhoun's mother, and his sister, Evelyn, survived him.

== Selected works ==
=== Plays ===
- And the Clown Laughed. 1945.
- Josephine. 1948.
- Aeneas '63: A Play in Three Acts. 1948.
- Take My Hand: A Play in Three Acts. 1948.
- Story of a Boy: A Play in Three Acts. 1950.

=== Radio ===
- "Canary Yellow". On Stage with Cathy and Elliott Lewis, 1954.
- "Ditty and Mr. Jasper". On Stage with Cathy and Elliott Lewis, 1954.
- "Fork of the Road". On Stage with Cathy and Elliott Lewis, 1954.
- "Driftwood". On Stage with Cathy and Elliott Lewis, 1954.
- "The Courage of Carver". Hallmark Hall of Fame, 1955.

=== Television work ===
- The Lineup. Actor: "The Submachine Gun Case", 1955.
- Sheena, Queen of the Jungle. Writer: "Devils Mountain", 1956.
- Circus Boy. Story: "Elmer the Great", 1956.
- This Man Dawson. Teleplay: "The Silent Men", 1959.
