= Circus Boy =

American children's television series (1956–1957)

- Genre: Adventure; Family; Western
- Written by: See Episode List
- Directed by: George Archainbaud; William Beaudine; Fred Jackman, Jr.; Robert G. Walker; Douglas Heyes; Lew Landers
- Starring: Micky Dolenz (credited as Mickey Braddock); Noah Beery, Jr.; Robert Lowery; Bimbo the Elephant
- Theme music composer: Hal Hopper; Victor McLeod
- Country of origin: United States
- Original language: English
- No. of seasons: 2
- No. of episodes: 49

Production
- Producers: Norman Blackburn; Herbert B. Leonard
- Running time: 24–26 minutes
- Production companies: Norbert Productions; Screen Gems Television

Original release
- Network: NBC
- Release: September 23, 1956 – June 23, 1957
- Network: ABC
- Release: September 19 – December 12, 1957

Circus Boy is an American Western adventure family television series that aired in prime time on NBC, and then on ABC, from 1956 to 1957. It was then rerun by NBC on Saturday mornings, from 1958 to 1960.

== Summary ==
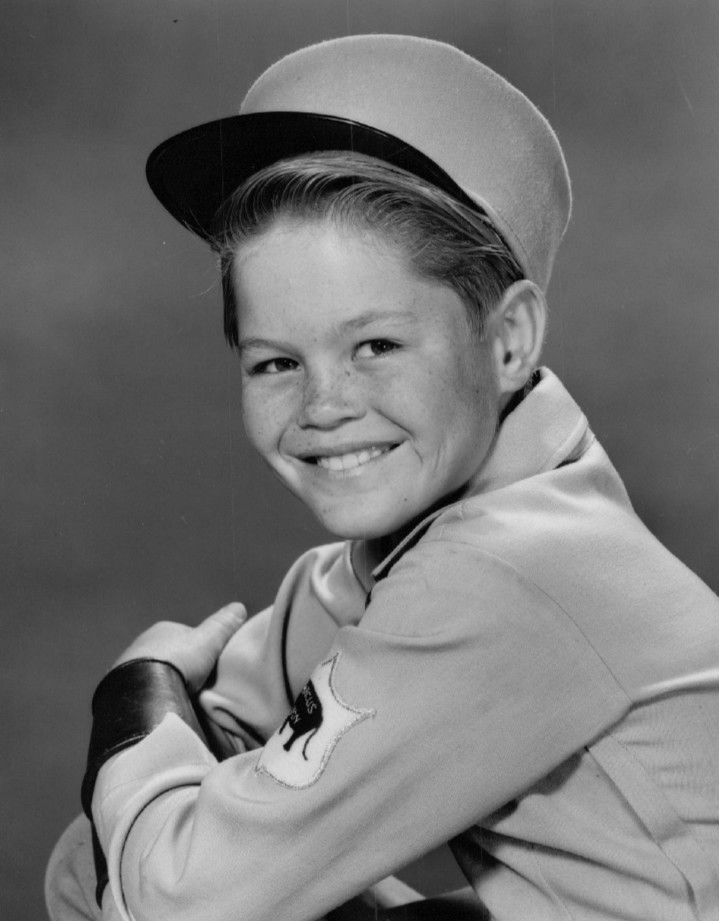
Dolenz as Corky.

Set in the late 1890s, the title of the series refers to a boy named Corky. After his parents, "The Flying Falcons," were killed in a trapeze accident, young Corky (Micky Dolenz – billed at the time as Mickey Braddock) was adopted by Joey the Clown (Noah Beery, Jr.), and the whole Burke and Walsh Circus family. When school was brought up for Corky, Joey said he was a school teacher for many years before joining the circus and could easily handle his education.

The young boy quickly found a role with the circus as water boy to Bimbo, a baby elephant whom Corky would come to consider his pet. Riding Bimbo's back, Corky dealt with adolescent problems, and helped the show's adults including Joey, owner/promoter Big Tim Champion (Robert Lowery) and head canvasman Pete (Guinn Williams), keep the circus successful as the traveling show moved from town to town each week.

Outside of an elephant being the animal companion, the series was similar to popular "boy and his dog" shows of the time, such as Lassie/Jeff's Collie, and The Adventures of Rin Tin Tin.

Unusually, the opening credits billed the regular actors by their character names, rather than their own names.

== Cast ==
=== Series regulars ===
Actor	Role
Mickey Braddock	Corky Foster
Noah Beery, Jr.	Uncle Joey the Clown
Robert Lowery	Big Tim Champion
Guinn Williams	Pete
Bimbo	Corky's pet elephant

=== Recurring roles and notable guest stars ===
Actor	Role	Appearances
Billy Barty	Little Tom	Episodes 1 and 2
Tom Brown	Ned Bailey	Episodes 29
Andy Clyde	Col. Jack Bixby	Episodes 2, 18, 31 and 39
Jane Darwell	Mamie, the seamstress	Episode 17
Coco Dolenz sister of Micky Dolenz	Annie Simmons	Episode 26
Coco Dolenz sister of Micky Dolenz	Coco from the orphanage	Episode 42
Anthony Caruso	Gambino	Episodes 3 and 22
Ed Hinton	Mike	Episode 18
Ed Hinton	Sheriff	Episode 43
Ed Hinton	Glenn Keyes	Episode 48
Sterling Holloway	Elmer Purdy	Episodes 15, 37 and 44
Brad Johnson	Frank Dillard	Episode 27
Russell Johnson	Ben Osgood	Episode 5
Ralph Moody	Casey Perkins	Episodes 6 and 41
Ralph Moody	Chief Spotted Horse	Episode 9
Ralph Moody	Ezra Hillman	Episode 23
Nan Leslie	Muriel	Episode 30
Ken Osmond	Skinny	Episode 23
Hal Peary	Al Garson	Episode 33
Slim Pickens	Curly	Episode 8
Dan White	Deputy Gus, Sheriff and Ben Otis	Episodes 16, 21 and 26
Willard Waterman	Mayor Humphrey	Episode 42

=== First episode guest stars ===
The following cast appeared in the debut episode only. Several sources erroneously list these three, as well as Billy Barty from Episodes 1 and 2, as series regulars.

Actor	Role
Leo Gordon	Hank Miller
Eddie Marr	Barker
Olin Howlin	Swifty

== Episodes ==
=== Series overview ===
Overview of Circus Boy seasons
Season	Episodes	Originally released		Network	Time slot
Season	Episodes	First released	Last released	Network	Time slot
1	36	September 23, 1956	June 23, 1957	NBC	Sundays, 7:30 pm
2	13	September 19, 1957	December 12, 1957	ABC	Thursdays, 7:30 pm

=== Season 1 (1956–57) ===
No. overall	No. in season	Title	Directed by	Written by	Original release date
1	1	"Meet Circus Boy"	Robert G. Walker	Douglas Heyes	September 23, 1956
Big Tim Champion buys the Burke & Walsh Circus, and arrives just in time to stop a fight between the circus troupe and some strangers. He then turns his attention to Corky, the orphan who has been living with the circus since a trapeze accident had taken the lives of his parents. Initially, he decides that he cannot allow Corky to remain with the troupe.
2	2	"The Fabulous Col. Jack"	Robert G. Walker	Victor McLeod & Seymour Robinson	September 30, 1956
Corky persuades Big Tim to hire Col. Jack, but the others of the troupe become suspicious of him when his tall tales come true.
3	3	"The Great Gambino"	Robert G. Walker	Victor McLeod	October 7, 1956
The circus buys a new lion, but it is too ferocious, and turns on the trainer.
4	4	"The Amazing Mr. Sinbad"	Robert G. Walker	Victor McLeod	October 14, 1956
Horseback rider Ben Ali is the circus' star performer. He takes a dislike to Corky, and threatens to quit if the boy remains. Corky runs away and ends up in a ghost town, where he meets Mr. Sinbad, a former cavalry camel.
5	5	"Corky and the Circus Doctor"	Douglas Heyes	Douglas Heyes & Otis Gaylord	October 21, 1956
The circus veterinarian, Pop Warren, seems powerless to stop the spread of disease among the animals. This prompts Big Tim to hire a new veterinarian, Ben Osgood. When Bimbo takes ill, Osgood recommends he be destroyed.
6	6	"Casey Rides Again"	Robert G. Walker	Lee Erwin	November 4, 1956
A flood has washed out the bridge to Carson City, where the circus is scheduled to perform. Retired railroad engineer Casey Perkins saves the show.
7	7	"The Little Fugitive"	Douglas Heyes	Douglas Heyes	November 11, 1956
Arthur Pincus, a friend of Joey's, plans to marry a widow, and must win the friendship of her son.
8	8	"The Proud Pagliacci"	Robert G. Walker	Victor McLeod	November 18, 1956
Fritz Phieffer, a former circus performer, visits his friends at the circus, and leads them to believe that he owns the farm where he works.
9	9	"White Eagle"	Robert G. Walker	Victor McLeod	November 25, 1956
Corky befriends Chief Spotted Horse, the wild west show star. Others of the circus troupe are jealous of the chief's popularity. Taylor, the groom, makes an attempt on his life.
10	10	"The Little Gypsy"	Robert G. Walker	Seymour Robinson & Victor McLeod	December 2, 1956
Corky, Joey and Big Tim rescue an equestrienne, who has been kidnapped by her gypsy suitor.
11	11	"The Masked Marvel"	Robert G. Walker	Max Lamb	December 9, 1956
Circus trick shot artist Billy Stanton is kidnapped by his brother, Earl, who takes his place to rob the circus.
12	12	"The Good Samaritans"	George Archainbaud	Douglas Heyes & Otis Gaylord	December 23, 1956
At Christmas time, local tycoon Ben Farmer urges the townspeople to let the circus know that it is not welcome. To make matters worse, his son David picks a fight with Corky.
13	13	"Daring Young Man"	Robert G. Walker	Charles Stewart	December 30, 1956
Corky recommends his friend, Cal Jones, for a job as a high dive artist. However, Cal has a fear of heights.
14	14	"Farewell to the Circus"	Robert G. Walker	Story by : Victor McLeod; Teleplay by : Lee Erwin	January 6, 1957
Martha Neilson discovers that she is Corky's aunt. Not feeling that the circus is a proper surrounding for the boy, she attempts to adopt him.
15	15	"Elmer the Aeronaut"	Robert G. Walker	Story by : Thonnis Calhoun; Teleplay by : Lee Erwin	January 13, 1957
Corky helps his friend, fellow circus troupe member Elmer Purdy, build a passenger balloon. Against Big Tim's order's, the two take the balloon on its maiden flight.
16	16	"The Remarkable Ricardo"	George Archainbaud	Charles N. Stewart	January 20, 1957
The circus escape artist is suspected of being a thief. Corky follows him, hoping to find that it isn't true, but ends up locked in a bank vault.
17	17	"Big Top Angel"	Lew Landers	Story by : Victor McLeod; Teleplay by : Lee Erwin	January 27, 1957
Circus wardrobe mistress Mamie is working to put her grandson Ken through medical school. After spending a summer with the circus, Ken wants to quit school to marry Estelle the trapeze artist.
18	18	"The Return of Col. Jack"	Robert G. Walker	Lee Erwin	February 10, 1957
While Big Tim is away, Col. Jack shows up. Having loaned money to the circus, he takes it upon himself to run the show. His good intentions result in chaos.
19	19	"The Knife Thrower"	Robert G. Walker	Story by : Rik Vollaerts; Teleplay by : Rik Vollaerts & Victor McLeod	February 17, 1957
Firpo the knife thrower saves Corky's life, but in so doing injures his eye. He makes Corky and Joey promise not to reveal this, so he can continue his act. Problems are compounded by tensions between Firpo and his brother Marino, the trapeze artist.
20	20	"Joey's Wedding Day"	George Archainbaud	Lee Erwin	February 24, 1957
Joey, thinking Corky needs a mother's care, considers marriage. Pete sends for his sister, to meet Joey. Once Joey decides that he is not ready for such a commitment, he must find a way to break it off without offending Pete or his sister.
21	21	"Man From Cimarron"	Robert G. Walker	Story by : Victor McLeod; Teleplay by : Lee Erwin	March 3, 1957
The harness repairman thrills Corky with stories of his days in the old west. When he witnesses a robbery, and refuses to identify the criminals, Corky becomes disillusioned.
22	22	"The Great Gambino's Son"	George Archainbaud	Victor McLeod	March 10, 1957
Gambino the lion tamer brings his son Antonio to the circus, presuming that he will want to continue in his father's footsteps. The younger Gambino initially rebels, then tries to honor his father's wishes, but eventually he finds his own role in the circus. At a staff party, Antonio leads the group in singing a song (the theme song of the TV series, with lyrics).
23	23	"Corky's Big Parade"	Robert G. Walker	Wallace Bosco	March 24, 1957
Small town racket boss Flint demands an exorbitant fee for the circus to perform. A friendly farmer allows the show to set up in his field, just outside town. Corky and the local boys are called upon to promote the show, which Flint tries to shut down.
24	24	"The Lady and the Circus"	George Archainbaud	Barney Slater	March 31, 1957
A former sweetheart of Big Tim's arrives, and the relationship is rekindled. They plan to marry, but he feels that the hardships of circus life are more than he can ask his bride to share. So, he contemplates selling the circus.
25	25	"Counterfeit Clown"	Lew Landers	Victor McLeod	April 7, 1957
Minerva Murdock, a wealthy widow, hires the circus to perform at her engagement party. There are those who doubt her fiancè's intentions. Joey recognizes him as being a fellow clown from years past, which he denies.
26	26	"The Pawnee Strip"	George Archainbaud	Lee Irwin	April 14, 1957
When the government makes grant land available, Corky talks the circus folk into joining the land rush. Then they discover that they must farm the land to keep it. Meanwhile, a farm family, befriended by Corky, becomes the victim of an unscrupulous land investor.
27	27	"The Cub Reporter"	Robert G. Walker	Kenneth A. Enochs	April 21, 1957
Working at a newspaper during a winter break, Corky learns the importance of fair and unbiased reporting. He then discovers that the editor is allowing the mayor to control the paper.
28	28	"General Pete"	Lew Landers	Wallace Bosco	April 28, 1957
In the spring of 1898, at the onset of the Spanish–American War, Pete decides to join Teddy Roosevelt's Roughriders. He had known Roosevelt in years past, and Corky asks him to use his influence to get him on as a drummer boy. While at the camp, Pete discovers a plot to assassinate Roosevelt.
29	29	"The Tumbling Clown"	Robert G. Walker	David Lang	May 5, 1957
Ned Bailey, former clown and a friend of Joey, wants to return to the circus. However, Joey finds that some detectives are looking for him.
30	30	"Death-Defying Dozetti"	Lew Landers	Wallace Bosco	May 12, 1957
Aerialist Dozetti feels he's the star attraction, and his aerialist wife avoids the lime light. When he is injured and cannot do his act, he is surprised at his wife's ability.
31	31	"Col. Jack's Brother"	Robert G. Walker	Victor McLeod	May 19, 1957
The circus' friend and creditor, Col. Jack, goes on a trip to Africa, and leaves his brother, Jonathan Bixby, in charge of his business. Against Col. Jack's orders, Jonathan tries to take over the circus, firing some of the crew and cutting the food supply. Andy Clyde played both brothers.
32	32	"The Swamp Man"	Robert G. Walker	Wallace Bosco	May 26, 1957
While in Louisiana, Corky befriends a young Cajun man, who shows him a mysterious French note from his grandfather. The resulting treasure hunt attracts some local thieves.
33	33	"Hortense the Hippo"	George Archainbaud	Story by : P. K. Palmer; Teleplay by : Lee Irwin	June 2, 1957
Col. Jack sends Corky a hippopotamus to work with. This further aggravates an ongoing rivalry with Al Garson's circus.
34	34	"The Fortune Teller"	Robert G. Walker	Mona Fisher	June 9, 1957
A new cook joins the circus, and the troupe takes her tea leaf readings seriously.
35	35	"The Gentle Giant"	George Archainbaud	Barney Slater	June 16, 1957
Abdulla, the circus strong man, quits to join a medicine show. When the circus hires a new strong man, the owner of the medicine show proposes a contest between the two.
36	36	"Little Vagabond"	Lew Landers	Story by : P. K. Palmer; Teleplay by : Lee Irwin	June 23, 1957
A lost boy, staying with the circus until his parents can be located, loses his belligerent attitude when he sees the equestrian act.

=== Season 2 (1957) ===
No. overall	No. in season	Title	Directed by	Written by	Original release date
37	1	"Elmer The Rainmaker"	Robert G. Walker	Kenneth A. Enochs	September 19, 1957
When the circus enters a drought stricken area, Corky joins Elmer in his balloon, to seed clouds. Their plan backfires, and the townspeople blame them for contaminating their dwindling water supply.
38	2	"Royal Roustabout"	Robert G. Walker	Lee Erwin	September 26, 1957
Eric, 15-year-old heir to the throne of Corvania, runs away from the embassy to join the circus. Big Tim gives him star billing as a horseman, not knowing his true identity.
39	3	"Bimbo, Jr."	Robert G. Walker	Victor McLeod	October 3, 1957
Col. Jack returns, this time bringing a small royal elephant from India. Corky showers the new arrival with attention, and names him Bimbo, Jr. This makes Bimbo jealous, and he refuses to perform and runs away.
40	4	"Alex The Great"	William Beaudine	Kenneth A. Enochs	October 10, 1957
When Corky's parents had fallen, their catcher felt responsible and left the circus. Later, Joey sees him in the audience and persuades him to come back.
41	5	"The Return Of Casey Perkins"	Robert G. Walker	Wallace Bosco	October 17, 1957
Casey Perkins, a friend of the circus, wants to bring a railroad line into a small town, but meets opposition from a rival railroadman, and from Indians.
42	6	"Major Buffington"	Robert G. Walker	Mona Fisher	October 24, 1957
Two con men, escaping from a small town, stow away on a train which is taking a new tiger joining the circus. Once there, they concoct a scheme to steal the proceeds from performance which is intended to benefit a local orphanage.
43	7	"The Clemens Boys"	Fred Jackman	Kenneth A. Enochs	October 31, 1957
After seeing the circus, a young man is determined to join, but refuses to allow his brother to accompany him.
44	8	"The Magic Lantern"	Fred Jackman	Victor McLeod	November 7, 1957
Big Tim sends Corky and Joey into town to buy supplies, but they use the money to get their friend Elmer out of jail. This involves them in Elmer's latest scheme, the marketing of magic lantern motion picture shows.
45	9	"The Dancing Bear"	William Beaudine	Andy White and Victor McLeod (from a story by Andy White)	November 14, 1957
Karl Hofer wants to join the circus, along with his performing bear, Mitzi. Having been cheated by this man in the past, Big Tim does not trust him, but hires him anyway. When Mitzi escapes, local farmers blame her for recent sheep killings.
46	10	"The Marvelous Manellis"	William Beaudine	Victor McLeod	November 21, 1957
Big Tim hires a three-person high wire act from another circus, and then finds that one recently injured member will not perform.
47	11	"Uncle Cyrus"	William Beaudine	Wallace Bosco	November 28, 1957
Pete has led his Uncle Cyrus to believe that he owns the circus. When Cyrus visits, Big Tim agrees to play along, and trades places with Pete.
48	12	"The Judge's Boy"	Fred Jackman	Kenneth A. Enochs	December 5, 1957
A local judge who is running for congress has little time for his son, Carlton, who joins the circus. Meanwhile, Big Tim rescues the judge from an attack by the son of an opposing candidate.
49	13	"The Return Of Buffalo Bill"	Fred Jackman	Jerome S. Gottler and Victor McLeod (from a story by Jerome S. Gottler)	December 12, 1957
Big Tim tries to convince Buffalo Bill Cody to perform. Cody wants to have nothing to do with the circus, feeling that his devotion to his own wild west show had been partly responsible for his son's death.

== References in The Monkees ==
Micky Dolenz sings the theme to the series in "The Monkees at the Circus", an episode of The Monkees. When asked by Mike Nesmith "What 'is' that?", Dolenz responds "It's the theme song for an old TV series". Their song "Porpoise Song" contains references to the series, most notably with the line "riding the back of giraffes for laughs is alright for a while." In their song, "I'm Going to Buy Me a Dog", Micky Dolenz says he can train a dog. Davy Jones says, "I thought you only trained elephants."
