= Sam Houston Math, Science, and Technology Center =

Sam Houston Math, Science and Technology Center
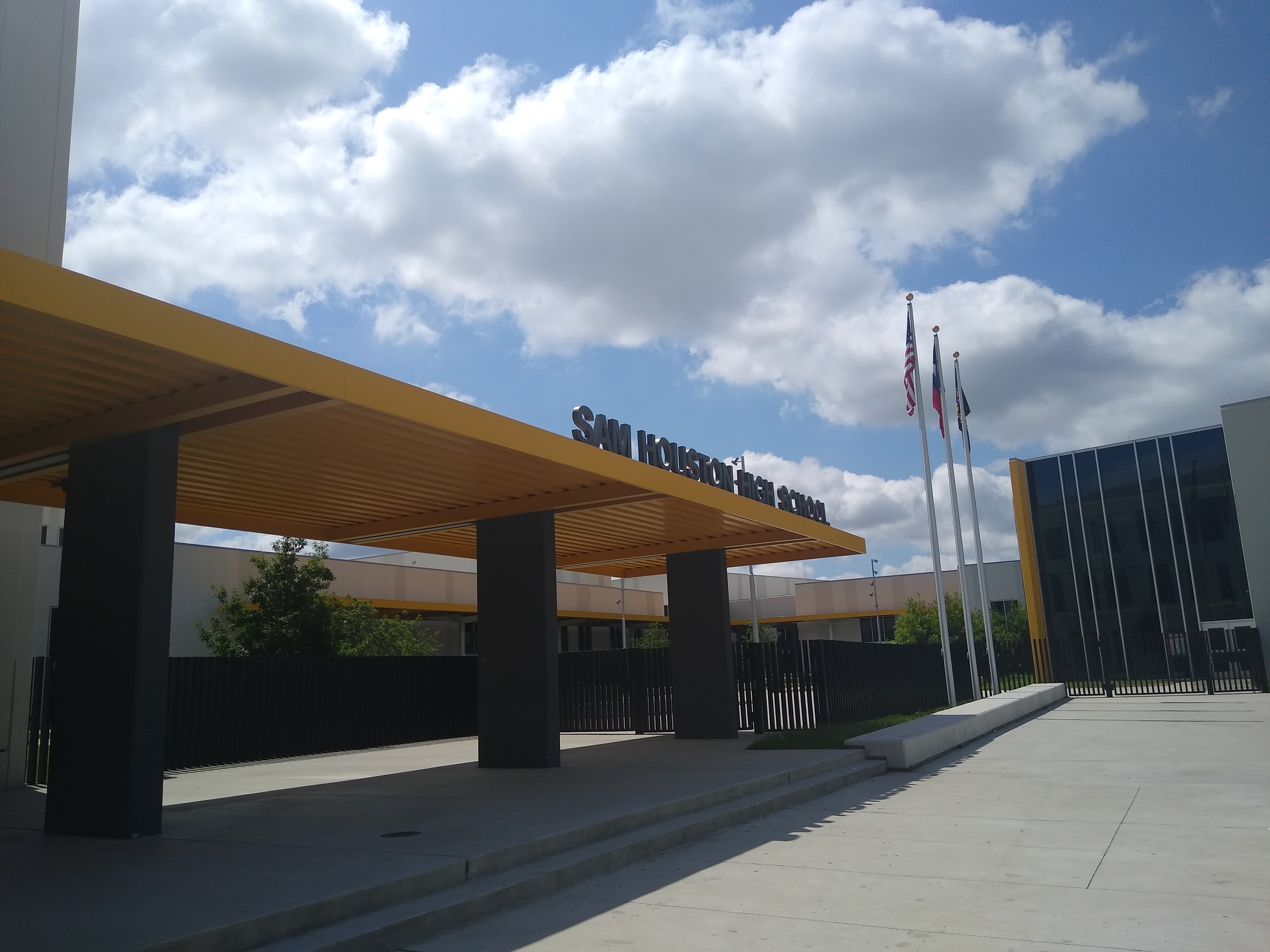

Location
- 9400 Irvington Blvd; Houston, Texas 77076; 29°50′51″N 95°21′37″W

Information
- Type: Public school (U.S.)
- Founded: 1878
- Principal: Dr. Diego Linares
- Staff: 163.04 (FTE)
- Grades: 9 - 12
- Enrollment: 2,644 (2023-2024)
- Student to teacher ratio: 16.22
- Campus type: Urban
- Colors: Gold and black
- Mascot: Tiger
- Feeder schools: Burbank Middle School
- Website: hmstc.houstonisd.org

Sam Houston Math, Science, and Technology Center (SHMSTC), formerly known as Sam Houston High School is a high school located in the Hawthorne Place and Timber Garden subdivisions, in Houston, Texas, United States. Sam Houston Math, Science, and Technology Center handles grades nine through twelve and is part of the Houston Independent School District. Before 1955, it was located in Downtown Houston.

Established in 1889, Sam Houston operates the oldest high school newspaper in Texas, the Aegis. Additionally, the school boasts the world's first female-only military drill squad initially known as the Black Battalion but now called the Tigerettes.

The school is often referred to simply as "Sam" by students, alumni, and faculty.

Sam Houston High School Baseball Field is located at 29°51′03″N 95°21′41″W.

== History ==
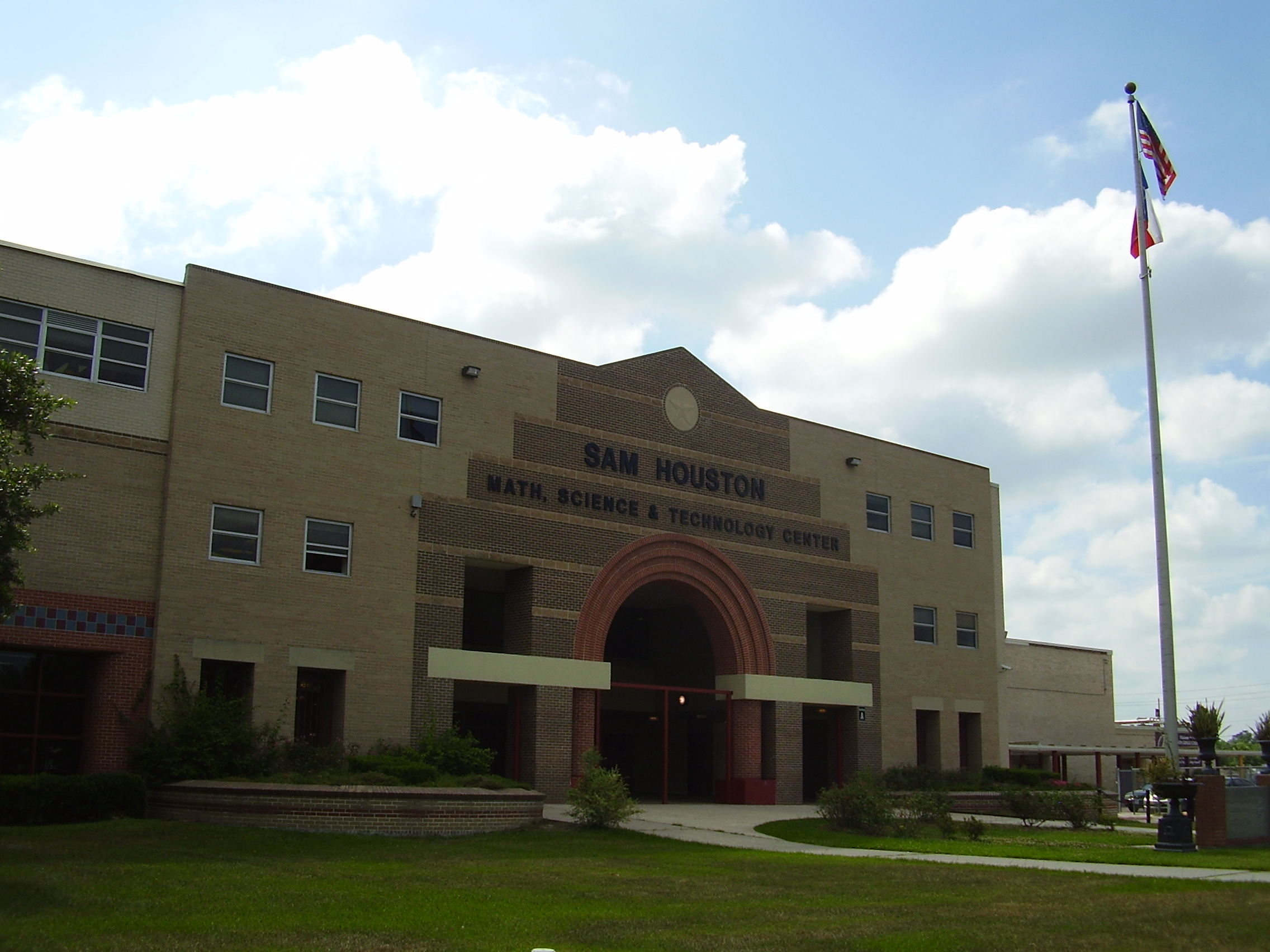
Houston High School prior to the rebuild

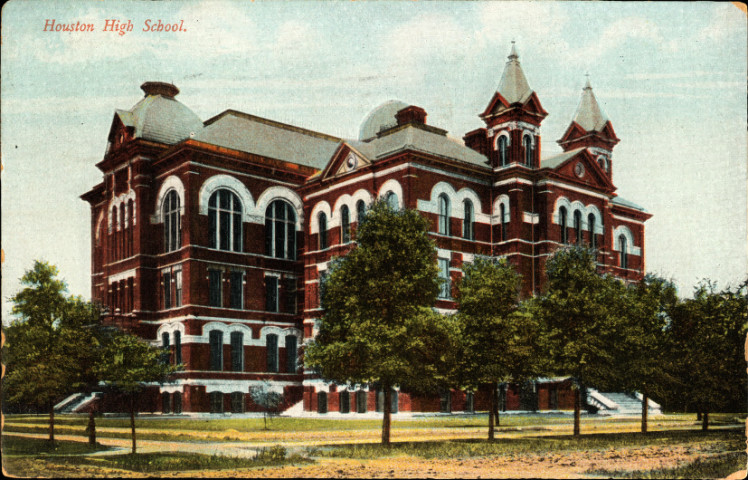
Houston High School as of October 1909

SHMSTC was founded in Downtown Houston in 1878 as Houston Academy. Since then, it has had several name changes.

- Houston Academy: 1878 to 1881
- Clopper Institute: 1881 to 1886
- Houston Normal School: 1886 to 1895
- Houston High School: 1895 to 1926
- Central High School: 1926 to 1955
- Sam Houston High School: 1955 to 2008 (also referred to as Sam Houston Senior High School)
- Sam Houston Math, Science, and Technology Center: 2008 to now

Until the 1950s, the block bordered by Austin, Capitol, Caroline, and Rusk in Downtown Houston housed the institutions that make up what is now Sam Houston High School. Houston Academy was there in the 1850s. In 1894 Central High School was built. J.R. Gonzales of the Houston Chronicle said that the school was "[d]escribed as one of the finest high schools in this part of the country" and "also attracted negative attention for its incredible cost." The school had a price tag of $80,000, $1.9 million in 2010 dollars. In March 1919 the school burned down. A new Sam Houston opened two years later.

According to a 1936 Houston Chronicle article, Sam Houston was to be renamed after Dick Dowling, while the Sam Houston name would be taken by a new high school in southwestern Houston. This did not occur, and the school remained named after Sam Houston.

In 1955, Houston High School moved from its Capitol Street location in Downtown to its current location. The previous Sam Houston High School became the Houston Independent School District administrative headquarters. In July 1970 the first Hattie Mae White Administration Building became the new HISD administrative offices. The Downtown Sam Houston building was demolished. As of 2011, a parking lot owned by HISD now occupies that site. A historical marker is on the south side of that block. In meetings, it had been proposed as a new location for the High School for the Performing and Visual Arts.

Sam Houston has Texas' oldest high school newspaper, the Aegis, started in 1889. In addition, the world's first girls' military drill squad (formerly known as the Black Battalion, but now called the Tigerettes) originated at the school.

Sam Houston was previously reserved for white children, with Hispanics being categorized as white prior to 1970, but it desegregated by 1970.

Today, it has a mostly Hispanic student body.

The names of the individual schools currently occupying the Sam Houston campus were chosen in 2008.

On Saturday February 12, 2011, a state historic marker was dedicated at SHMSTC. The Oran M. Roberts Chapter 440 of the United Daughters of the Confederacy organized the event. Lynna Kay Shuffield, the president of the chapter, wrote a historical narrative about the school and its former location in Downtown.

Renovation of the campus started in late 2016 was completed in 2019.

The Sam Houston Tiger football team holds the distinction of having both the longest active and all time district game losing streak in the entire state of Texas with 100 consecutive losses in district play as of 2022.

The school has been characterized as being a place where discipline issues are rampant, soliciting police involvement. Neighbours allege illegal activity is rampant when students convene after school, and engage the sale and consumption of narcotics, as well as openly carry firearms and engage in shootings. There have been reports of students bringing firearms to campus.

== Rating ==
Sam Houston High School, with Jack Yates High School and Kashmere High School, were the three high schools in Houston ISD that were consistently low-performing in test scores from 2001 to 2004. Because of this problem, there were movements to have the state or another organization take over the schools for a period so the test scores will be at acceptable levels. While Yates received an acceptable rating in 2005, SHMSTC and Kashmere continued to receive unacceptable ratings. Abelardo Saavedra, then superintendent of HISD, described SHHS was "close" to receiving an acceptable rating. In August 2006, the school learned that it again got an unacceptable rating from the Texas Education Agency. HISD threatened to close SHHS. SHHS was not closed and it received another unacceptable rating from the TEA in 2007. Houston ISD, stated that the board would consider spending $300,000 to find a method to improve Sam Houston's marks from the TEA.

In 2008 the Texas Education Agency Commissioner Robert Scott ordered the closure of SHHS; the Houston Chronicle said that HISD would likely replace 75% of the teachers and change the name of the school. The campus housed Sam Houston Math, Science, and Technology Center beginning 2010–2012 and a ninth grade academy. The administration hopeds that the changes would help the school achieve an acceptable rating.

In 2007, an Associated Press/Johns Hopkins University study referred to Sam Houston as a "dropout factory" where at least 40% of the entering freshman class does not make it to their senior year.

== Student body ==
During the 2005–2006 school year, the school had 2,678 students.

- 91% were Hispanic American
- 6% were African American
- 3% were White American
- Less than 1% were Asian American

No Native Americans were enrolled during that school year.

Approximately 89% of the students qualified for free/reduced lunch.

== Neighborhoods served by Sam Houston ==
Several areas of Houston outside of the 610 Loop that are far north of Downtown and south of Aldine are zoned to Sam Houston.

Neighborhoods include Melrose Park, Hardy Acres, Hardy Heights, Assumption Heights, Roos Acres, Virginia Acres, Sunnyland Farms, Oakwood, and Northline Terrace.

Two Houston Housing Authority public housing complexes, Heatherbrook Apartments and Oxford Place, are zoned to the school.

Some small sections of unincorporated Harris County are zoned to Sam Houston High School.

== Feeder patterns ==
Elementary schools that feed into Sam Houston include:

- Barrick
- Burbank
- Coop
- DeChaumes
- Durkee
- Janowski
- Lyons
- Moreno
- Northline
- Scarborough

(partial)

- Berry
- Garcia
- Herrera
- Kennedy
- Osborne

All of Fonville Middle School-zoned areas and some areas of the Burbank Middle and Henry Middle School zones feed into Sam Houston.

== Notable people ==
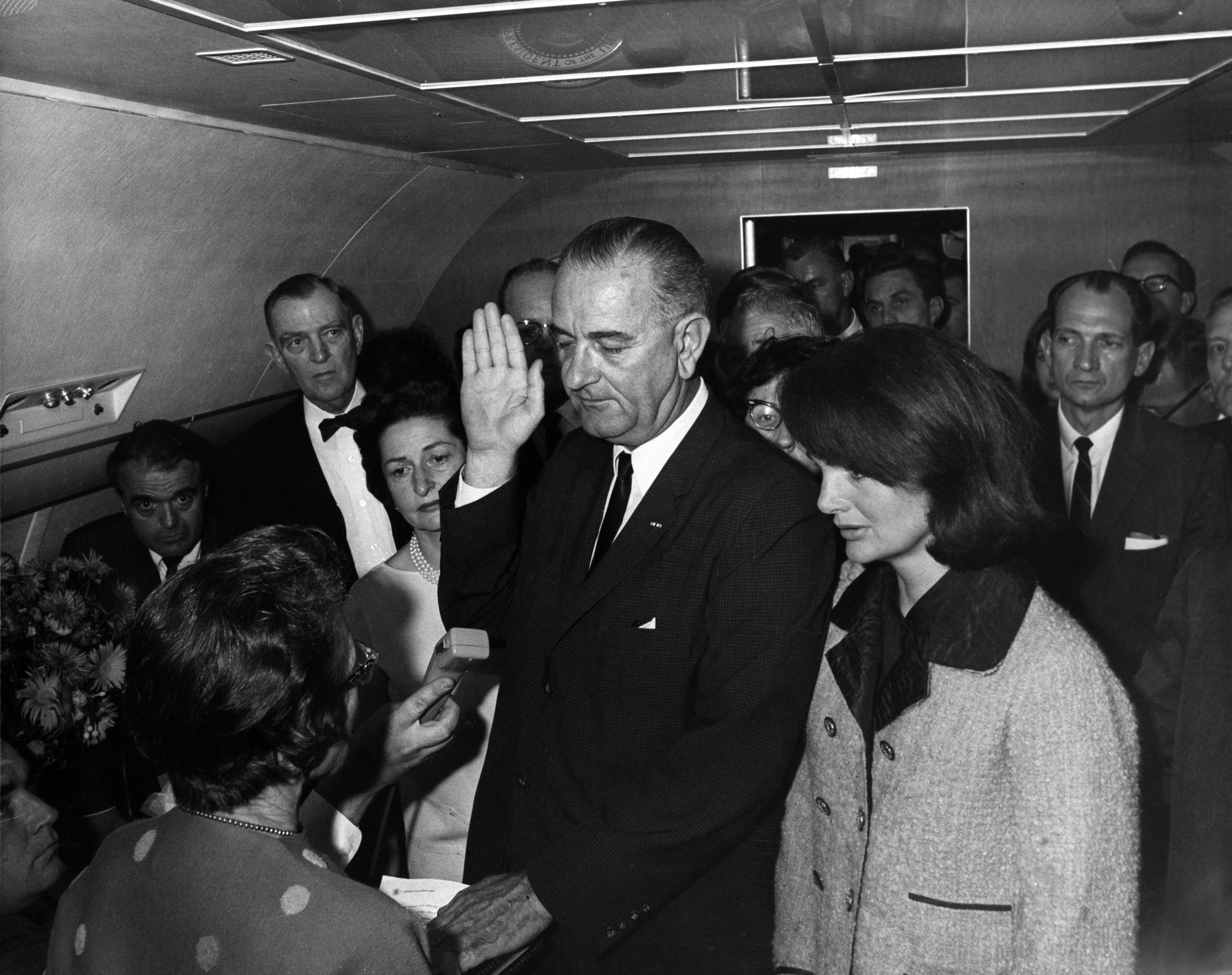
On November 22, 1963, following the assassination of US President John F. Kennedy, alumnus Jack Valenti (far left) was present at then-US Vice President Lyndon B. Johnson's swearing-in ceremony as the new US president aboard Air Force One.

=== Notable alumni ===
- Melvin Baker, American football player
- Joe Bowman, class of 1943, bootmaker and marksman
- Thonnis Calhoun, radio and television writer
- Kendric Davis, basketball player
- William Goyen, novelist
- Jack Valenti, former president of the Motion Picture Association of America, special assistant to US President Lyndon B. Johnson

=== Notable faculty ===
- Lyndon B. Johnson: 36th president of the United States (1963–1969), taught public speaking in 1930.
