= On Stage (radio show) =

American radio show

- Other names: On Stage with Cathy and Elliott Lewis; Cathy and Elliott Lewis on Stage
- Running time: 30 minutes
- Country of origin: United States
- Language: English
- Hosted by: Elliott Lewis; Cathy Lewis
- Starring: Elliott Lewis; Cathy Lewis
- Announcer: George Walsh
- Created by: Elliott Lewis
- Written by: Morton Fine; David Friedkin; Shirley Gordon; E. Jack Neuman
- Directed by: Elliott Lewis
- Produced by: Elliott Lewis
- Original release: January 1, 1953 – September 30, 1954
- No. of episodes: 77
- Opening theme: The Cathy and Elliott Theme

On Stage is an American radio show also known as On Stage with Cathy and Elliott Lewis and Cathy and Elliott Lewis on Stage. It was an anthology program that aired on CBS for two seasons from 1953 to 1954.

== Origin ==
Elliott and Cathy Lewis had wanted a half-hour weekly show over which they had creative control as early as 1946. On Stage came about as radio was in a time of transition due to the popularity of television. Elliott, an actor, director, writer, and producer, wanted to do an anthology series with his wife, Cathy. Elliott was starring on The Phil Harris-Alice Faye Show and directing Suspense. Cathy Lewis performed on many programs and was starring as Jane Stacy on My Friend Irma. Elliott served as transcriber, director, producer, and actor of On Stage. He also edited the episodes and wrote the openings and closings.

== Format ==
Episodes began with "The Cathy and Elliott Theme" by Ray Noble, the following introduction, and a greeting from the hosts with information about the episode.

"Cathy Lewis, Elliott Lewis, two of the most distinguished names in radio, appearing each week in their own theater, starring in a repertory of transcribed stories of their own and your choosing. Radio's foremost players in radio's foremost plays. Dramas, comedy, adventure, mystery and melodrama."

The stories were of all genres—romance, drama, comedy, thriller, western, adventure and literary classic. Both experienced and up-and-coming writers contributed scripts. Contributors included Morton Fine, David Friedkin, Shirley Gordon, E. Jack Neuman, Richard Chandlee, and Antony Ellis.

At the center of each episode was the relationship between the characters played by the Lewises. They were sometimes lovers or spouses; sometimes family or friends; sometimes strangers; and occasionally enemies.

Episodes ended with a concluding dialogue between the stars and a statement about the next week's title and its writer.

== Reception ==
A review in Broadcast Television called the Lewises "experts at underplay."

== Episodes ==
Many episodes of On Stage are thought to be no longer in existence, though over three dozen are publicly available online. Some of these lack the introductions and closings. Titles and air dates appear in Martin Grams' Radio drama: A Comprehensive Chronicle of American Network Programs, 1932-1962. Information regarding the cast and crew comes from the episodes themselves, or from the original scripts. Plots of lost episodes come from newspaper listings or from the original scripts.

Number	Episode title	Date	Writer(s)	Notes
1	"The String Bow Tie"	January 1, 1953	Morton Fine, David Friedkin	With Sheldon Leonard, Mary Jane Croft, Martha Wentworth, Vivi Janiss, and Byron Kane. Comic complications result when an advertising writer stars in an advertisement for perfume.
2	"Beirut by Sunrise"	January 8, 1953	Richard Chandlee	With Edgar Barrier, Byron Kane, and Ben Wright. A romantic tale of a young woman's adventures during a cruise. It was re-done on Suspense, on May 31, 1955.
3	"A Poetic Tragedy"	January 15, 1953	Richard Powell	With Bob Sweeney and Byron Kane. A theatre director/producer oversells a bad show for profit, a scheme also used in The Producers.
4	"Cargo"	January 22, 1953	Morton Fine, David Friedkin	With John Dehner, Ben Wright, and Anthony Barrett. Adventure, danger, heartbreak, and death in the jungle.
5	"Public Furlough"	January 29, 1953	Antony Ellis	With Byron Kane, Herb Butterfield, and Jerry Hausner. A soldier writes to a movie star, but his Hollywood trip isn't what he expected. It was also performed on Romance, on May 19, 1956, with a different cast.
6	"A Corner of Autumn"	February 5, 1953	Morton Fine, David Friedkin	With Clayton Post, Paula Winslowe, Junius Matthews, and Byron Kane. The troubled romance between an alcoholic pianist and a never-was nightclub singer. Cathy Lewis sings "Back in Your Own Backyard". This was also the audition episode for the series.
7	"The Party"	February 12, 1953	E. Jack Neuman	An observational comedy of manners at a party hosted by a woman who's in her element, and a man who's out of his depth.
8	"Four Meetings"	February 19, 1953	Morton Fine, David Friedkin	With Jeanette Nolan and Ben Wright. Adapted from the Henry James short story, in which a man recalls his tragic cousin, whom he met only four times.
9	"A Fifth of Tears"	February 26, 1953	Bob Sweeney	With Barbara Whiting, Bob Sweeney, Byron Kane, Charlotte Lawrence, Irene Tedrow, and Joseph Granby. An undercover policewoman infiltrates gangland activity at a seedy bar, to rescue a young girl.
10	"Call Me a Cab"	March 12, 1953	Shirley Gordon	With Mary Jane Croft, Howard McNear, and Peggy Webber. A lonely woman and a lonely cab driver share a romantic daydream on a rainy day.
11	"Eddie"	March 19, 1953	E. Jack Neuman	With Clayton Post, Jerry Hausner, and Peggy Webber. The story of a stalker and the missed opportunities to stop him.
12	"Dig, the Thief"	March 26, 1953	Morton Fine, David Friedkin	With John McIntire, Lee Millar, Bob Sweeney, Hal Gerard, Ken Christy, Ge Ge Pearson, and Byron Kane. Comic tale of a charming conman who poses as an archaeology expert.
13	"The Lady or the Tiger"	April 2, 1953	Shelby Gordon	With Sammie Hill, Junius Matthews, and Alan Reed. Adapted from a short story by Frank Stockton.
14	"The Bunch of Violets"	April 9, 1953	Shirley Gordon	With Dick Beals, Byron Kane, Charlotte Lawrence, Lou Merrill, and Peggy Webber. A businessman's impulsive purchase of a little bunch of violets causes comic misunderstandings. Cathy Lewis and Peggy Webber each play 3 roles.
15	"Casey at the Bat"	April 16, 1953	E. Jack Neuman	With Hy Averback, Herb Butterfield, Byron Kane, Peter Leeds, Hal March, Howard McNear, and Sidney Miller. Based on the poem of the same name by Ernest Thayer. A charming comic tale, purporting to tell the "real" reason why Casey struck out.
16	"Skin Deep"	April 23, 1953	Richard Chandlee	With Janet Waldo, Larry Thor, Herb Butterfield, Herbert Rawlinson, and Paul Frees. A homely female lawyer's jealousy of a plaintiff subconsciously drives her to maliciously prosecute the innocent woman.
17	"Happy Anniversary Album"	April 30, 1953	Elliott Lewis (script), Ray Noble (music)	With Manny Klein and Red Nichols. Re-creation of a record the Lewises made with Ray Noble in 1948. Aired in honor of the Lewis' 10th wedding anniversary. Cathy sings "The Very Thought of You."
18	"The Bear"	May 7, 1953	Walter Brown Newman	With Byron Kane and Horace Murphy. The play The Bear by Anton Chekhov is adapted into a Western, in which a brash and boorish man tries to collect a debt from a widow obsessed with her deceased husband. The script was also used under the title of "The Hooligan" on The Richard Boone Show on January 14, 1964.
19	"Statement of Fact"	May 14, 1953	E. Jack Neuman	With Joan Danton, Byron Kane, Joseph Kearns, Jack Kruschen, Truda Marsden, and Tyler McVey. An ambitious Assistant State's Attorney meets with an accused axe-murderess. The script was adapted as the premiere episode of The Richard Boone Show on September 24, 1963.
20	"Conrad in Quest of His Youth"	May 21, 1953		(Lost episode) Based on the bittersweet Leonard Merrick novel about a man in his late 30s, who tries to recapture the happiness of his youth by returning to the people and places he'd loved.
21	"The Hanging at Four Oaks"	May 28, 1953	Shirley Gordon	With Edgar Barrier, Harry Bartell, Byron Kane, Johnny McGovern, and Barney Phillips. Western tale of a dancehall singer and an outlaw who's a killer.
22	"And a Fond Farewell"	June 4, 1953	Arthur Ross	With Byron Kane. Comedy about a romantic triangle involving a college drama professor, his wife, and their old college friend who's now a famous actor and still a bachelor.
23	"East Lynne"	June 11, 1953		(Lost episode) Based on the classic Victorian novel and melodrama East Lynne. According to the teaser in the outro of the previous week's episode, it was chosen purely so Elliott could make the old theatrical in-joke of saying, "Next week: East Lynne".
24	"An Ideal Couple"	June 18, 1953	Tom Dickson	With Tom Dixon and Paul Frees. A happily married couple is chosen to appear on a television show called "Happy, Though Married".
25	"A Day to Remember"	June 25, 1953	Shirley Gordon	With Lynn Terry, George Pirrone, Byron Kane, Paula Winslowe, and Howard McNear. The comic tribulations of a couple preparing for their daughter's high school graduation.
26	"The Midnight Ride of Paul Revere"	July 2, 1953	Richard Chandlee	
27	"Man of Independent Mind"	July 9, 1953	Shelby Gordon	With Frank Nelson, Jerry Hausner, Byron Kane, and Barney Phillips. A man resolves to become the strongest man in the world, by starting small: by breaking toothpicks.
28	"Miracle for Julie"	July 16, 1953	Shirley Gordon	(Lost episode) A critic and an agent set out to manufacture love for a hard-hearted actress.
29	"The Fling"	July 23, 1953	E. Jack Neuman, adapted from an original story by Het Mannheim.	With Herb Butterfield and Sammie Hill. A man who has lived in the desert with his invalid wife for 7 years, is tempted to have a one-night stand with a lively waitress. The script was later adapted for The Richard Boone Show on November 12, 1963.
30	"The Girl I Tried to Love"	July 30, 1953		(Lost episode) After a funeral attended by 529 men, one man reveals that the dead woman was the girl he had tried to love.
31	"A Month of Sundays"	August 13, 1953	Antony Ellis	(Lost episode) A struggling real estate agent takes a young woman house-hunting, every Sunday afternoon for a month.
32	"Canary Yellow"	August 20, 1953	Thonnis Calhoun	With Lou Merrill, Larry Merrill, and Ge Ge Pearson. A very successful actor recounts the story of his childhood theatrical debut.
33	"Child in the Room"	August 27, 1953	Shirley Gordon	(Lost episode) A child's reaction to an emotional crisis between his parents.
34	"I Love You, I Love You, Gezundheit!"	September 9, 1953		(Lost episode) Comedy about a guy who sneezes every time he kisses his girl.
35	"The Crustacean"	September 16, 1953	E. Jack Neuman	With Parley Baer and Larry Thor. Dark drama about a mentally-challenged dishwasher and a reptilian waitress, at a hotel in the middle of nowhere.
36	"Penny Ante"	September 23, 1953	Ross Murray	With Peter Leeds, Jay Novello, Edgar Barrier, and Byron Kane. Writer Murray was the show's sound effects artist. This is the first of three episodes involving Stanley Finston. Stanley finds a dollar on the floor of a Las Vegas casino, and gambles it into a fortune...over his wife's protests.
37	"Loving"	September 30, 1953	Arthur Ross	Three short plays: "Loving", "The Self-Loved", and "The Loved Ones". Starring William Conrad, Byron Kane, Barney Phillips, and Clayton Post. Cathy and Elliott Lewis each play three different roles.
38	"The Great Dane"	October 7, 1953		(Lost episode) The sad story of an ex-football hero and the wife whose love he couldn't hold.
39	"Ditty and Mr. Jasper"	October 14, 1953	Thonnis Calhoun	(Lost episode) Amusing tale about an imaginative 10-year-old's suspicions about her stepfather.
40	"Take My Hand, My Love"	October 21, 1953	Samuel B. Harrison	Romance develops between an artist and a writer, in turn-of-the-century Greenwich Village.
41	"Cellar Door"	October 28, 1953	Antony Ellis, from a story by Bernard Girard	(Lost episode) Psychological drama about a couple that gets accidentally locked in the cellar, leaving their toddler to face everyday dangers alone. The script was re-done on Suspense, on January 24, 1956.
42	"Vickie" (AKA "A Woman of Vengeance")	November 4, 1953	Ross Murray and Tony Barrett	(Lost episode) A spoiled young woman marries a man to destroy him because she was his second choice.
43	"The Marathon"	November 11, 1953	Antony Ellis	(Lost episode) Comedy about a champion marathon dancer (and first-class jerk) in the 1930s, and his new partner who refuses to be pushed around.
44	"A Circle of Wheels"	November 18, 1953	Arthur Ross	With Whitfield Connor. X-rays reveal that a couple has tiny gears growing inside them.
45	"New York Is a Nice Place to Visit, But I Wouldn't Want to Live There"	November 25, 1953		(Lost episode) A pair of ex-sweethearts meet for a clandestine evening away from their respective mates.
46	"Our American Cousin"	December 2, 1953		Based on the play by Tom Taylor. Aired immediately after the Crime Classics episode: "The Assassination of Abraham Lincoln".
47	"Passing Strange"	December 9, 1953		(Lost episode) Tale of a desperate widower, and the woman who wants to give him a second chance at love.
48	"Candide"	December 16, 1953	Richard Chandlee	With Edgar Barrier, Byron Kane, Jack Kruschen, Howard McNear, Larry Thor, Martha Wentworth, and Ben Wright. Adaptation of the novella by Voltaire.
49	"Happy Holidays"	December 30, 1953	Elliott Lewis (script), Ray Noble (music)	With Ray Noble. Re-creation of the 1949 record, a sequel to Happy Anniversary
50	"Gopher Man"	January 6, 1954		(Lost episode) A couple's all-night party is interrupted by the arrival of the Gopher Man.
51	"Camille"	February 3, 1954		(Lost episode) Dramatization of Dumas' classic novel of the consumptive courtesan Camille.
52	"Tragedy off Hollywood Boulevard"	February 10, 1954		(Lost episode) The story of an unemployed Hollywood actor and his wife.
53	"Heartbreak"	February 17, 1954	E. Jack Neuman	With Byron Kane. A 38-year-old businessman suffers a heart attack. He survives, but becomes a cardiac invalid, afraid to do anything. Episode was written in honour of the Heart Fund Campaign.
54	"The Dreamer"	March 3, 1954	Don Yerrill	With Joseph Kearns, Byron Kane, and Herb Vigran. A young couple's life is disrupted by an elderly relative who builds inventions in their basement.
55	"The Crusade of Stanley Finston"	March 10, 1954	Ross Murray	In this sequel to "Penny Ante", Stanley Finston gets a traffic ticket, and refuses to accept that you can't fight City Hall.
56	"Occurrence up a Side Street"	March 17, 1954		(Lost episode) On a sweltering day, a criminal couple hides out in a ramshackle house, where the corpse of their murder victim lies upstairs, rotting. Based on a short story by Irvin S. Cobb.
57	"Heaven's to Betsy"	March 24, 1954	Antony Ellis	(Lost episode) A family's life is turned upside down when a small UFO lands in their yard. The script was re-used on Suspense on Oct. 11, 1955.
58	"Three Anniversaries"	March 31, 1954		(Lost episode) Vignettes of three different marriages. Cathy and Elliott each play three roles.
59	"Hidden Heart"	April 7, 1954		
60	"The Referee"	April 14, 1954		(Lost episode) A husband and wife en route to divorce court are in a car accident, and find themselves in hospital...and in a fantasy court, facing the ultimate judge.
61	"A Man and His Mountain"	April 21, 1954		(Lost episode) A man gambles all he has, to seek something he believes he has lost.
62	"Giant's Fireplace	April 28, 1954	Richard Chandlee	With Jerry Hausner, William Conrad, Byron Kane, and Lee Millar.
63	"Fork in the Road"	June 17, 1954	Thonnis Calhoun	(Lost episode) The story of a marriage, told in a mother's humorous and heartwarming letter to her daughter.
64	"Younger Sister"	June 24, 1954		(Lost episode) The responsibility an older sister feels towards her younger sister almost wrecks two marriages.
65	"Some Days It Just Doesn't Pay"	July 1, 1954		(Lost episode) Did you ever have one of those days when you should have just stayed in bed?
66	"Welcome Home Dan"	July 8, 1954	E. Jack Neuman	(Lost episode) After 8 years, a world traveler returns to his hometown to see the girl he left behind. Can he tell her he's terminally ill? And should he? The script was adapted for the January 21, 1961 episode of The Richard Boone Show.
67	"The Book of Next Month"	July 15, 1954		(Lost episode) The story of how an imaginative wastrel becomes the author of the Book of the Month.
68	"Interlude"	July 22, 1954	Ross Murray	(Lost episode) A man walks out on his wife, and finds solace—and the solution to his problem—in another woman's company.
69	"The Telegram"	July 29, 1954		Comedy of a couple driven to distraction by worrying what's in a telegram that's waiting for them.
70	"Diversion"	August 5, 1954		
71	"Driftwood"	August 12, 1954		(Lost episode) A proposal of marriage at a carefree beach party is the setting for an engrossing character-study.
72	"Stanley Finston, Stockbroker"	August 19, 1954	Ross Murray	In this sequel to "Penny Ante" and "The Crusade of Stanley Finston", the Finstons win one share of oil company stock, and decide to go to Texas to look out for their interests. Lost episode.
73	"The Prize Fighter"	August 26, 1954	E. Jack Neuman	(Lost episode) An aging and beaten boxer takes on one more match to prove to his son that he's not a coward.
74	"Lovely Dead Letter"	September 2, 1954	Antony Ellis	(Lost episode) With Byron Kane, Barney Phillips, Hy Averback. A man who works in the Dead Letter Office daydreams about what might have happened if the dead letters were delivered. The script was re-used on Romance on Oct. 22, 1956.
75	"Saralee, You Are Lovely As the Summer Night"	September 9, 1954	Morton Fine, David Friedkin	A simple-minded, overly-romantic orphan girl works as a chambermaid, and tells romantic tales.
76	"Sleepytime Gal"	September 16, 1954		
77	"Fascination"	September 23, 1954	Richard Chandlee	With Clayton Post, Junius Matthews, Irene Tedrow, Jack Kruschen, and Byron Kane.
78	"A Circle of Wheels"	September 30, 1954	Arthur Ross	With Whitfield Connor. Rebroadcast of the Nov. 18, 1953 episode.
