= The Bob Cummings Show =

American television sitcom (1955–1959)

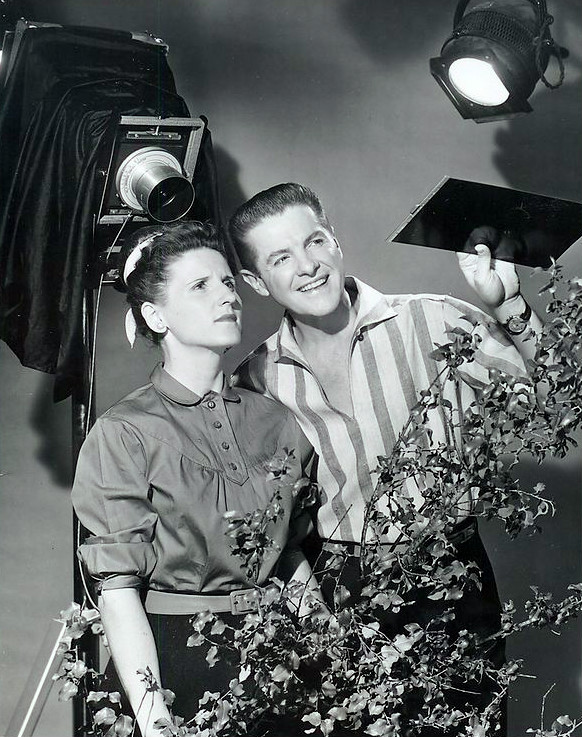
- Bob (Bob Cummings) and Schultzy (Ann B. Davis) in The Bob Cummings Show
- Also known as: Love That Bob
- Created by: Paul Henning
- Written by: William Cowley; Shirley Gordon; Paul Henning; Bill Manhoff; Lawrence Menkin; Phil Shuken; Dick Wesson
- Directed by: Rod Amateau; Bob Cummings; Fred DeCordova; Edward Rubin; Norman Tokar
- Starring: Bob Cummings; Ann B. Davis; Rosemary DeCamp; Dwayne Hickman
- Narrated by: Bill Baldwin
- Theme music composer: Del Sharbutt; Frank Stanton; Richard Uhl
- Opening theme: "A Romantic Guy, I"
- Ending theme: "A Romantic Guy, I"
- Composers: Lou Kosloff; Mahlon Merrick; Clarence Wheeler; Vic Mizzy; Paul Smith; Skip Martin; Gil Grau
- Country of origin: United States
- No. of seasons: 5
- No. of episodes: 173 (list of episodes)

Production
- Executive producer: George Burns
- Producer: Paul Henning
- Production companies: Laurel Productions; McCadden Productions; Henning Corporation

Original release
- Network: NBC
- Release: January 2 – July 28, 1955
- Network: CBS
- Release: September 22, 1955 – June 6, 1957
- Network: NBC
- Release: September 24, 1957 – September 15, 1959

The Bob Cummings Show (also known in reruns as Love That Bob) is an American sitcom starring Bob Cummings, which was broadcast from January 2, 1955, to September 15, 1959.

The program began with a half-season run on NBC, then ran for two full seasons on CBS, and returned to NBC for its final two seasons. The program was later rerun on ABC daytime and then syndicated under the title Love That Bob. A similar (but less successful) follow-up series, The New Bob Cummings Show, was broadcast on CBS during the 1961–62 television season.

== Overview ==
The series stars Cummings as dashing Hollywood photographer, Air Force reserve officer, and ladies' man, Bob Collins. The character's interest in aviation and photography mirrored Cummings' own, with his character's name the same as the role he played in the 1945 film You Came Along. The series also stars Rosemary DeCamp as his sister Margaret MacDonald. In some episodes, Cummings also doubled as Bob and Margaret's grandfather, Josh Collins of Joplin, Missouri.

The Bob Cummings Show was important in the development of several careers including series creator, producer, and head writer Paul Henning. Henning, who a decade earlier was a major force in the character development and writing of The Burns and Allen television and radio shows, was a co-producer with George Burns of the Cummings show. He later produced such major 1960s hits as The Beverly Hillbillies, Petticoat Junction, and Green Acres. Regulars in the show included Ann B. Davis, who twice won Emmy Awards for playing Bob Collins' assistant Schultzy. Henning apparently remembered cast members Nancy Kulp and Joi Lansing favorably, giving both of them roles several years later on The Beverly Hillbillies, Kulp as Miss Hathaway (secretary to banker Milburn Drysdale—a character similar to Pamela Livingstone, the one she played on Cummings' show), and Lansing as Gladys Flatt, wife of Lester Flatt. A decade after The Bob Cummings Show left the air, Davis went on to play the housekeeper Alice Nelson in The Brady Bunch. In the 1995 film The Brady Bunch Movie, which featured another actress playing Alice, Davis reprised the role of Schultzy for a cameo that suggests the character went on to become a truck driver.

Olive Sturgess appeared in 12 episodes as Carol Henning, girlfriend to Bob's nephew, Chuck. Versatile character actress Kathleen Freeman appeared in six episodes as Bertha Krause. Perhaps the biggest career boost was received by young Dwayne Hickman, a student at Loyola University in Los Angeles, who appeared as the nephew and became a favorite with young female viewers. During the last season of The Bob Cummings Show, he was cast as the lead in CBS's The Many Loves of Dobie Gillis.

This program represented the height of Cummings' television career. Although he later starred in two other early-'60s series, The New Bob Cummings Show and My Living Doll, and made guest appearances on several other TV series, he never again achieved that level of success on television.

== Episodes ==
Season	Episodes	Originally released	
Season	Episodes	First released	Last released
1	28	January 2, 1955	July 28, 1955
2	37	September 22, 1955	June 21, 1956
3	34	October 4, 1956	June 6, 1957
4	36	September 24, 1957	June 17, 1958
5	38	September 23, 1958	July 7, 1959

== Cast ==
=== Regulars ===
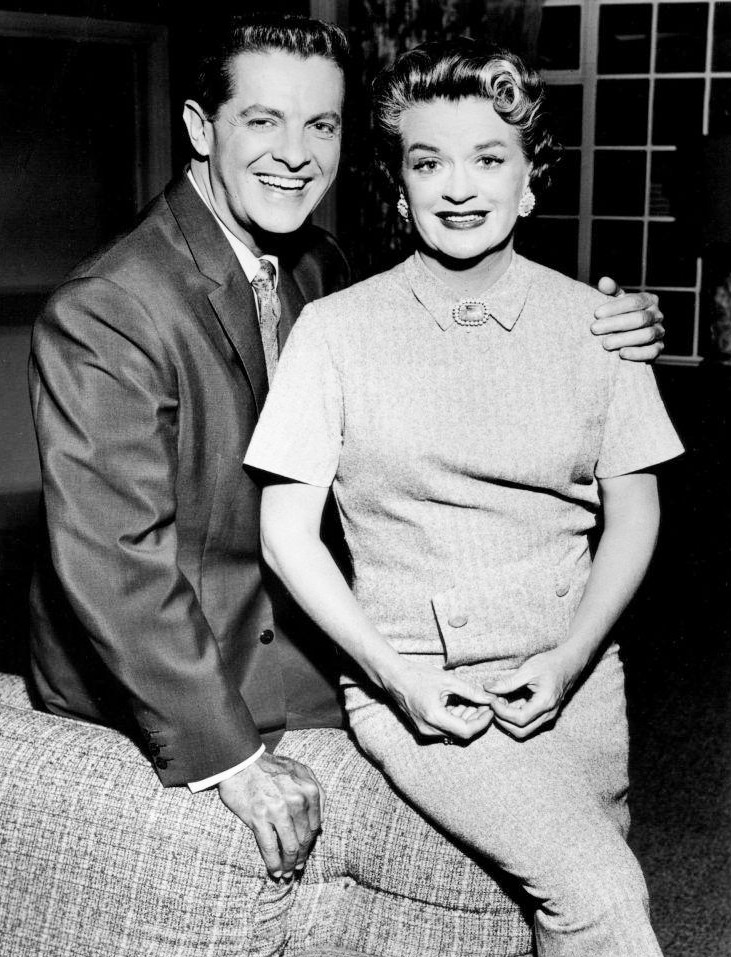
Bob (Bob Cummings) and Margaret (Rosemary DeCamp) in The Bob Cummings Show

- Bob Cummings as Bob Collins, a womanizing photographer
  - Cummings also played "Grandpa" Josh Collins in over a dozen episodes throughout the course of the series
- Rosemary DeCamp as Margaret MacDonald, Bob's widowed sister who always tried her best to raise her brother's moral level
- Dwayne Hickman as Chuck MacDonald, Margaret's son and Bob's nephew, a teenager always vying for his uncle's attention and trying to impress the models his uncle worked with
- Ann B. Davis as Charmaine "Schultzy" Schultz, Bob's young secretary, who pines for him and occasionally sabotages his love schemes with other women

=== Recurring ===
- Joi Lansing as Shirley Swanson, a frequent model used by Bob, and also a frequent date.
- Lyle Talbot as Paul Fonda, an old WWII air force pal of Bob's
- King Donovan as Harvey Helm, another old air force buddy of Bob's, now a furniture company executive
- Nancy Kulp as Pamela Livingstone, an eccentric birdwatching expert who, like Schultzy, pines for Bob—and who is comically aggressive in her pursuit
- Lisa Gaye as Collette DuBois, another of Bob's frequent models and sometime date
- Olive Sturgess as Carol Henning, Chuck's girlfriend (seasons 3 and 4; guest in season 5)
- Diane Jergens as Francine Williams, an earlier steady girlfriend of Chuck's (seasons 1 and 2)
- Jeffrey Silver as Jimmy Lloyd, Chuck's high school best friend (seasons 1 to 3)
- Tammy Marihugh as Tammy Johnson, a precocious 8-year-old who is introduced to Bob's life (season 5)
- Gloria Marshall as Mary Beth Hall, another frequently employed statuesque model (seasons 1 through 4)
- Rose Marie as Martha Randolph, a secretary and friend of Schultzy's who works in the same building as Bob's photography studio (season 5)
  - Rose Marie also played other roles in two season 4 episodes
- Kathleen Freeman as Bertha Krause, a secretary and friend of Schultzy's who works in the same building as Bob's photography studio (seasons 2 through 5)
- Mary Lawrence as Ruth Helm, Harvey's firmly-in-charge wife (seasons 2 through 5)
- Ingrid Goude as Herself—Ingrid Goude (Miss Sweden), another frequent model, and one-time Miss Sweden (seasons 3 and 4)
- Lola Albright as Kay Michaels, a starlet Bob pursues (seasons 2 and 3)

== Production ==
Cummings had earlier starred in the 1952 sitcom My Hero, which ran one season. Taft Schreiber of MCA brought George Burns and Paul Henning to Cummings and pitched him the idea for The Bob Cummings Show. They formed a company, Laurel, to make the show. Rod Amateau wrote many episodes. Henning drew extensively on Cummings' real-life past in creating the show.

The show was sold in August 1954, but Cummings did not agree to go on air until January "when we had a comfortable backlog of scripts." He did this due to his experience on My Hero, where he felt the show went to air without a sufficient supply of scripts.

"I also resolved we wouldn't aim at the kid audience", he added. "Sure, it's easy to develop a following that way, but kids are the most fickle audience in the world. Once they drop you, you're finished forever. So we aimed at the adults, but strangely enough, we started to develop a strong kid following anyway."

The role of Schultzy was created for Jane Withers. However, she had too many demands, which the producers were not willing to meet. Eddie Rubin suggested Ann B. Davis, who was cast.

The show started in January 1955 on NBC at Sunday 10:30 pm. In July, the series was shifted from NBC to CBS on Thursdays at 8 pm by its sponsor RJ Reyolds Tobacco to get more access to markets. In April 1957, the show moved back to NBC on Tuesday nights at 9:30 pm.

Dwayne Hickman became a break-out star on the show. The series had various recurring models who were given opportunities to act, including Suzanne Alexander, Sally Todd, Norma Brooks, and Joi Lansing.

Rod Amateau, who worked on the show, said the reason it was successful was:

He [Cummings' character] was unsuccessful. He would never score with these girls because his nephew, his sister, or Schultzy would show up. He had dreams and illusions of being a playboy, but he wasn't making it. His frustration is what made the show funny.

In December 1958, Davis signed to make two more years of the show. The same month, Hickman left for his own show The Many Loves of Dobie Gillis, although he had filmed enough episodes so that he appeared regularly on The Bob Cummings Show straight through to the series' conclusion.

In anticipation of Hickman's departure, a new character was introduced midway through the final season: a six-year-old waif named Tammy Johnson played by Tammy Marihugh. This character was seen in eight episodes, and presumably would have continued on as a precocious foil for the Bob Collins character had the series continued into season 6.

In January 1959, the show celebrated its fifth year. Henning put part of the reason for its success down to the fact that it was a tight operation – Henning wrote most episodes, Cummings directed, and Cummings' wife handled business.

During the making of the show, Cummings became increasingly under the grip of his addiction to methamphetamine, although this was kept from the public.

=== End of series ===
The series ended in 1959. Cummings said it was his decision, claiming he needed a break. He also said he had financial considerations, as he wanted to sell the show into syndication and wanted to do that before the show became too dated. He also claimed if he kept making it, he would be hit with a tax bill.

== Syndication ==
Reruns under the title Love That Bob appeared on ABC's daytime lineup from October 12, 1959, to December 1, 1961. Repeats were popular through the 1960s on local stations before reappearing on the CBN Cable Network in the mid-1980s. The series remains in syndication on some smaller stations today. The original opening credits for the series incorporated a commercial for Dunhill cigarettes and were replaced with the Love That Bob opening.

== Home media ==
Twenty episodes have lapsed into the public domain, and all were released by DigiView Productions in 2004, Critics' Choice Video in 2004–5, Platinum Disc, LLC in 2005, Echo Bridge Home Entertainment in 2005, and Alpha Home Entertainment in 2006, among others. Also, on March 20, 2012, MPI Home Video released a Region 1 DVD collection of episodes from Cummings' mid-1960s series My Living Doll, and a standalone episode of The Bob Cummings Show was included as a bonus feature.

== Awards ==
In 1956, Cummings was nominated for an Emmy for Best Actor in a Continuous Role and Ann B. Davis for Best Actress in a Supporting Role. The show was also nominated for Best Comedy. In 1958, the show was nominated for an Emmy for Best Comedy. Davis won for Best Supporting Actress. In 1959, the show, Cummings and Davis were nominated for Emmys.

== Influence ==
Ann B. Davis's character, Schultzy, was the inspiration for the comic-book character Pepper Potts, a supporting character in the Iron Man comics. Potts first appeared in Tales of Suspense #45 (September 1963), and was depicted with brown hair in a style resembling Schultzy's. Eventually, the editorial team decided that the resemblance was too great, and in Tales of Suspense #50, her appearance was altered to give her red hair and a different style.

== See also ==
- My Living Doll (episodes)
- The New Bob Cummings Show (episodes)
- My Hero
