= Shirley Gordon (writer) =

American writer

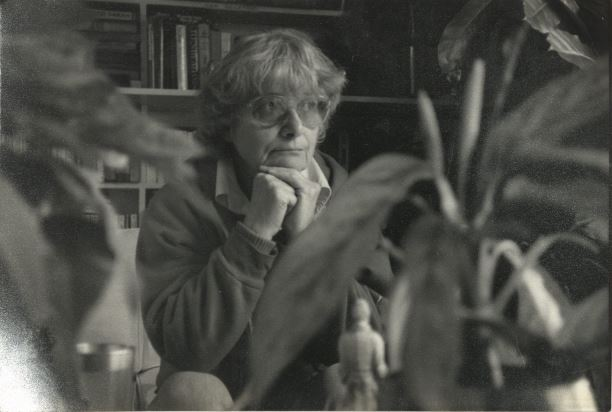
- Born: December 29, 1921; Geneva, Illinois, U.S.
- Died: February 22, 2008 (aged 86); Glendale, California, U.S.
- Education: East Aurora High School; Pasadena City College
- Writing career
- Pen name: Shirl Gordon
- Period: 1943–1989
- Genres: Radio, television, children's books

Shirley Gordon (December 29, 1921 – February 22, 2008) was an American writer of radio programs, television shows, and children's books.

== Early life ==
Gordon was born on December 29, 1921, in Geneva, Illinois, to Russell Gordon, a police officer, and Viola LaVoy Gordon. She graduated from East Aurora High School in Aurora, Illinois in 1938.

== Writing career ==
Early in her career, Gordon wrote for and was assistant editor of Radio Life magazine. She was also a publicist for CBS.

=== Radio and television shows ===
During the Golden Age of Radio, Gordon wrote scripts for anthology series Suspense ("The Statement of Mary Blake" in 1950 and "Death Parade" in 1951), The Whistler, and Elliott and Cathy Lewis' On Stage. When dramatic radio was revived in the 1970s, Gordon wrote scripts for The Hollywood Radio Theatre and Sears Radio Theatre.

From the 1950s to the 1970s, Gordon, sometimes credited as "Shirl Gordon", wrote episodes of popular sitcoms, including Bewitched, The Courtship of Eddie's Father, and My Three Sons. She wrote 49 episodes of The Bob Cummings Show.

=== Children's books ===
Gordon published eight books for children in the 1970s and 1980s. Six are picture books and two are chapter books.

- The Green Hornet Lunchbox (Houghton Mifflin, 1970), illustrated by Margaret Bloy Graham
- Grandma Zoo (Harper & Row, 1978), illustrated by Whitney Darrow Jr.
- The Boy Who Wanted a Family (Harper & Row, 1980), illustrated by Charles Robinson
- Me and the Bad Guys (Harper & Row, 1980), illustrated by Edward Frascino

Four of the books were narrated by a girl named Susan about her friend Crystal. All of the Crystal books were illustrated by Edward Frascino.

- Crystal Is the New Girl (Harper & Row, 1976)
- Crystal Is My Friend (Harper & Row, 1978)
- Happy Birthday, Crystal (Harper & Row, 1981)
- Crystal's Christmas Carol (Harper & Row, 1989)

== Personal life ==
Gordon had one son, David Russell Gordon, whom she adopted. Two of her books, The Boy Who Wanted a Family and Me and the Bad Guys, were based on her son's experiences.

Gordon and several of her friends, including actress Barbra Fuller, met every Saturday for years to take walks around Hollywood; in a 1994 episode of Visiting... with Huell Howser, the "Hollywood walking ladies" reminisce about their experiences in Hollywood in the 1940s and 1950s.

Gordon died on February 22, 2008, in Glendale, California.
