= List of The Love Boat episodes =

The American television series The Love Boat (Love Boat in its final season), set on a cruise ship, was aired on ABC from September 24, 1977, until May 24, 1986. Each episode has multiple titles, referencing the simultaneous storylines contained within. There were three pilot movies, followed by 245 regular episodes over nine seasons, followed by five specials.

There were typically three storylines in each episode. One storyline usually focused on a member of the crew, a second storyline would often focus on a crew member interacting with a passenger, and the third storyline was more focused on a single passenger (or a group of passengers). The three storylines usually followed a similar thematic pattern: One storyline (typically the "crew" one) was straight-ahead comedy. Another storyline would typically follow more of a romantic comedy format (with only occasional dramatic elements). The remaining storyline would usually be the most dramatic of the three, often offering few (if any) laughs and a far more serious tone.

== Series overview ==
Season	Episodes	Originally released	
Season	Episodes	First released	Last released
Pilots	3	September 17, 1976	May 5, 1977
1	25	September 24, 1977	May 20, 1978
2	27	September 16, 1978	May 12, 1979
3	28	September 15, 1979	May 3, 1980
4	28	October 25, 1980	May 16, 1981
5	29	October 3, 1981	May 15, 1982
6	29	October 2, 1982	May 7, 1983
7	27	October 1, 1983	May 12, 1984
8	27	September 22, 1984	May 4, 1985
9	25	September 28, 1985	May 24, 1986
Specials	5	November 21, 1986	February 12, 1990

== Episodes ==
=== Pilot movies (1976–77) ===
No. overall	No. in season	Title	Story	Directed by	Written by	Original release date
1	1	"The Love Boat"	Mona Lisa Speaks	Richard Kinon	Carl Kleinschmitt	September 17, 1976
1	1	"The Love Boat"	Till Death Do Its Part	Richard Kinon	Carl Kleinschmitt	September 17, 1976
1	1	"The Love Boat"	Mr. & Mrs. Havlicek Aboard	Richard Kinon and Alan Myerson	Robert Iles & James R. Stein	September 17, 1976
1	1	"The Love Boat"	Are There Any Real Love Stories?	Richard Kinon and Alan Myerson	Dawn Aldredge & Marion C. Freeman	September 17, 1976
First pilot movie. It includes the storylines "Mona Lisa Speaks", "Till Death Do Its Part"; "Mr. & Mrs. Havlicek Aboard"; and "Are There Any Real Love Stories?". None of the eventual TV series cast appear in this first production.
2	2	"The Love Boat II"	Here's Looking at You, Love	Hy Averback	Dawn Aldredge & Marion C. Freeman	January 21, 1977
2	2	"The Love Boat II"	For the Love of Sandy	Hy Averback	Story by : Dawn Aldredge & Marion C. Freeman and Leonora Thuna; Teleplay by : Dawn Aldredge & Marion C. Freeman	January 21, 1977
2	2	"The Love Boat II"	Unfaithfully Yours	Hy Averback	Carl Kleinschmitt	January 21, 1977
2	2	"The Love Boat II"	The Heckler	Hy Averback	Steve Pretzker	January 21, 1977
Second pilot movie. It includes the storylines "Here's Looking at You, Love"; "For the Love of Sandy"; "Unfaithfully Yours"; and "The Heckler". It has the first appearance of regular series cast members Fred Grandy as Gopher, Bernie Kopell as the ship's doctor and Ted Lange as Isaac the bartender.
3	3	"The New Love Boat"	The Newlyweds	Richard Kinon	Brad Buckner	May 5, 1977
3	3	"The New Love Boat"	The Exchange	Richard Kinon	Rick Hawkins & Liz Sage	May 5, 1977
3	3	"The New Love Boat"	Cleo's First Voyage	Richard Kinon	Michael Norell	May 5, 1977
Final pilot movie. It includes the storylines "The Newlyweds"; "The Exchange"; and "Cleo's First Voyage". It introduces regular series cast members Gavin MacLeod as Captain Stubing and Lauren Tewes as Julie the cruise director; the previous captain is said to be now on leave. Guest stars include Georgia Engel as a stowaway, Gary Frank and Melanie Mayron as a pair of tremulous honeymooners, Stella Stevens and Pat Harrington as an eternally bickering married couple, and Audra Lindley and Phil Silvers as respectively, an outspoken middle-aged lady and a woebegone widower. Guest Stars: Georgia Engel as Cleo Bagby, Gary Frank as Stanley Adams, Pat Harrington Jr. as Ernie Klopman (credited as Pat Harrington), Audra Lindley as Mae Allen, Melanie Mayron as Joyce Adams, Phil Silvers as Morris Beckman, and Stella Stevens as Leonara Klopman. Other Guests: William Bassett as Josh and Paula Victor as Paula.

=== Season 1 (1977–78) ===
No. overall	No. in season	Title	Directed by	Written by	Original release date
1	1	"Captain & the Lady"	Stuart Margolin	Michael Norell	September 24, 1977
1	1	"Centerfold"	Richard Kinon	Jay Grossman	September 24, 1977
1	1	"One If by Land..."	Alan Rafkin	Judy Skelton & Paula A. Roth	September 24, 1977
Captain Stubing's ex-wife (Bonnie Franklin) is a passenger with her new husband (Robert Symonds), a cruise line executive. She makes the crew pay for her animosity with the Captain. A former centerfold model (Meredith Baxter) struggles to hide her past from her fiancé who is a Congressman. A woman (Brenda Sykes) is followed by her boyfriend (Jimmie Walker) whom she dumped because he won't commit to marriage. Guest stars: Meredith Baxter as Sandy Rytell (credited as Meredith Baxter Birney), Bonnie Franklin as Stacy Skaugstad, Captain Stubing's Ex-Wife, Shelly Novack as Congressman Brad Brockway, Suzanne Somers as Lorraine Hoffman, Brenda Sykes as Ginny O'Brien, and Jimmie Walker as Ronald Baker. Other Guests: Robert Symonds as Aubrey Skaugstag, Gertrude Flynn as Mrs. Pendleton.
2	2	"A Tasteful Affair"	Richard Kinon	Ben Joelson & Art Baer	October 1, 1977
2	2	"Oh, Dale!"	Alan Rafkin	Carl Kleischmitt	October 1, 1977
2	2	"The Main Event"	Stuart Margolin	Rick Callahan	October 1, 1977
A man (John Ritter) poses as a woman because the only available cabin he could share was already occupied by another woman (Tovah Feldshuh). A quarreling couple (Sherman Hemsley, LaWanda Page) is trapped in an elevator. A tycoon hires a detective (Dennis Cole) to find out if his wife (Jaclyn Smith) is cheating. Guest Stars: Dennis Cole as Dennis Kingsley, Tovah Feldshuh as Susan Ridley, Sherman Hemsley as Maurice Marshall, LaWanda Page as Stella Marshall, John Ritter as Dale Riley / Dale Reinhardt, and Jaclyn Smith as Janette Bradford. Other Guests: Jennifer Shaw as Joanne Pringle (credited as Joanne), David Knapp as Lucas Bradford (credited as Lucas), Craig Littler as Carl Daggett, Tiiu Leek as Linda Daggett, and Mark Thomas as Peter Pringle.
3	3	"Ex Plus Y"	Alan Rafkin	Ed Jurist	October 8, 1977
3	3	"Golden Agers"	Stuart Margolin	Ann Gibbs & Joel Kimmell	October 8, 1977
3	3	"Graham and Kelly"	Alan Rafkin	Michael Norell	October 8, 1977
A man (Robert Reed) and woman (Loretta Swit) who are divorced from each other meet. Two teens (Kristy McNichol, Scott Baio) fall in love. A senior citizens guide (Charles Frank) is kept busy by his group and interfering with his romance with Julie. Guest Stars: Edward Andrews as Seniors Group Leader, Harry, Hermione Baddeley as Mrs. Kitty Pickrel, Scott Baio as Graham D. Pickrel II, Pamela Bellwood as Judy Watson, Charles Frank as Jim Wright, Seniors' Chaperone, Kristy McNichol as Kelly Rixie, Richard Mulligan as Ron Larsen, Robert Reed as Barney Mason, and Loretta Swit as Terry Larsen. Other Guests: Queenie Smith as Helen Lindsay, Betty Kean as Mrs. Svenson, and Florence Halop as Millie Lindsay.
4	4	"Message for Maureen"	Richard Kinon	Kenneth Hartigan & David Garber	October 15, 1977
4	4	"Gotcha"	Stuart Margolin	Richard Albrecht & Casey Keller	October 15, 1977
4	4	"Acapulco Connection"	Peter Baldwin	Neil Rosen & George Trecker	October 15, 1977
A sportswriter (Bill Bixby) romances a paraplegic former tennis pro (Brenda Benet), and they may have been a couple prior; Doc falls for a seasick stowaway (Charo) who creates havoc; A practical joker (Milton Berle) plays one joke too many and learns a lesson. Guest Stars: Brenda Benet as Maureen Mitchell, Milton Berle as Cyril Wolfe, Bill Bixby as John Ballard, Charo as April Lopez, and Audra Lindley as Anita Wolfe. Other Guests: Mary Grace Canfield as Housekeeper, Britt Leach as Reverend Dickerson (credited as Rev. Dickerson), and Lynne Adams as Martha Dickerson (credited as Mrs. Dickerson).
5	5	"Isaac the Groupie"	Peter Baldwin	Michael Norell	October 22, 1977
5	5	"Mr. Popularity"	Tony Webster	Tony Webster	October 22, 1977
5	5	"Help! Murder!"	James Sheldon	Ben Joelson & Art Baer	October 22, 1977
Isaac's favorite singer, Roxy Blue (Diahann Carroll), becomes his lover. Talky Robert Tanner's (Jim Nabors) popularity increases when fellow passengers think he may be a jewel thief. Bert Fredericks (David Groh) plans his wife Denise's (Michele Lee) birthday party, but she thinks it's a murder plot. Guest Stars: Diahann Carroll as Roxy Blue, David Gro as Bert Fredericks, Michele Lee as Denise Fredericks, Jim Nabors as Robert Tanner (later claims to be 'Roscoe Toller'), and Reva Rose as Myra Grove. Other Guests: Olan Soule as Harvey Grove (credited as Olan Soulé), and Robert Hastings as Customer (credited as Bob Hastings).
6	6	"The Joker Is Mild"	Richard Kinon	David Ketchum & Tony Dimarco	October 29, 1977
6	6	"Take My Granddaughter, Please"	Richard Kinon	Barry Blitzer	October 29, 1977
6	6	"First Time Out"	Alan Rafkin	Mark Evanier & Dennis Palumbo	October 29, 1977
Has-been comic Barry Keys (Phil Foster) asks Julie to let him entertain on board to return a favor. Mrs. Warner (Ruth Gordon) is determined to marry off her granddaughter Shirley (Patty Duke). College pals bet on whether virginal Dan (Robert Hegyes) changes his status before the cruise ends. Guest Stars: Patty Duke as Shirley Warner (credited as Patty Duke Astin), Phil Foster as Barry Keys, Ruth Gordon as Mrs. Warner, Robert Hegyes as Danny, Tab Hunter as Dave King, Maureen McCormick as Barbara Holmes, and John Mark Robinson as Lee. Other Guests: W.K. Stratton as Kyle, Meegan King as Paul, and Robert Hackman as Freddy Stevens – Booking Agent (credited as Bob Hackman).
7	7	"Julie's Old Flame"	Don Weis	Michael Norell	November 12, 1977
7	7	"The Jinx"	Don Weis	Howard Albrecht & Sol Weinstein	November 12, 1977
7	7	"The Identical Problem"	Don Weis	David Ketchum & Tony Dimarco	November 12, 1977
Identical twins (Diana Canova in a dual role) bewilder a smitten Doc. Julie tries to dodge a former beau (David Hedison). The crew blames a "jinxed" couple (Ray Bolger, Harriet Nelson) for a series of accidents. Guest Stars: Ray Bolger as Horace McDonald, Harriet Nelson as Henrietta McDonald, Diana Canova as Ellen Edwards / Helen Edwards, and David Hedison as Buddy Stanfield. Other Guests: Alana Stewart as Mrs. Stanfield (credited as Alana Collins).
8	8	"Lost and Found"	Stuart Margolin	Bruce Shelly	November 19, 1977
8	8	"The Understudy"	Stuart Margolin	Ben Joelson & Art Baer	November 19, 1977
8	8	"Married Singles"	Stuart Margolin	Ray Jessel	November 19, 1977
A cruise-director trainee (Jo Ann Harris) is after Julie's job. A bickering married couple (Polly Bergen, Steve Allen) pose as swinging singles. A childless couple (Sandy Duncan, Jim Stafford) takes in a young runaway (James Bond III). Guest Stars: Steve Allen as Durwood Moss, Polly Bergen as Maisie Nolan, Sandy Duncan as Sharon Baker, Jo Ann Harris as Connie Evans, and Jim Stafford as Richard Baker. Other Guests: Loni Anderson as Barbie, Joshua Bryant as Jack Plymouth (credited as Josh Bryant), J. Jay Saunders as Mr. Dennison, Marilyn Coleman as Mrs. Dennison, Hayden Rorke as Mr. Humbertson, and James Bond III as Theodore Dennison, Jr.
9	9	"The Captain's Captain"	Jack Arnold	Ann Gibbs & Joel Kimmel	November 26, 1977
9	9	"Romance Roulette"	Jack Arnold	Howard Albrecht & Sol Weinstein	November 26, 1977
9	9	"Hounded"	Jack Arnold	David Ketchum & Tony Dimarco	November 26, 1977
Three women (Jane Curtin, Susan Heldfond, Joanna Kerns) romance—but complications occur when they try to dump three men. The Captain's father (Phil Silvers) visits and falls for a galley cook (Judy Canova). A security dog traps a passenger (Gary Burghoff) in his bathroom. Guest Stars: Gary Burghoff as Donald M. Flanders, Judy Canova as P. J. Muldoon, Jane Curtin as Regina Parker, and Phil Silvers as Merrill Stubing, Sr. ('Stubby'). Other Guests: David Landsberg as Morton, Vincent Baggetta as Frank Vallone the plumber (credited as Vince Baggetta), Joanna Kerns as Beth Luckner, and Susan Heldfond as Toby Chapman. Others: Peter Mensah as Passenger (uncredited).
10	10	"Dear Beverly"	Allen Baron	Ben Joelson & Art Baer	December 3, 1977
10	10	"The Strike"	Allen Baron	Mark Fink	December 3, 1977
10	10	"Special Delivery"	Allen Baron	Marlon C. Freeman	December 3, 1977
Advice columnist Beverly Blanchard (Eva Gabor) neglects her husband, Russ (Leslie Nielsen), who thus spends time with a fellow passenger (Stephanie Blackmore). Captain Stubing wages war with a visiting chef, Antonio Borga (Al Molinaro). Julie's friend, Jeff Smith (Robert Urich), is separated from his wife, Gail (Pamela Franklin), but doesn't know that she's on board and carrying his child. Guest Stars: Pamela Franklin as Gail Smith, Eva Gabor as Beverly Blanchard, Al Molinaro as Chef Antonio Borga, Leslie Nielsen as Russ Blanchard, and Robert Urich as Jeff Smith (credited as Bob Urich). Other Guests: Meg Wyllie as Sister #1, Mary Treen as Sister #2.
11	11	"Lonely at the Top"	Allen Baron	Gordon Farr & Lynne Farr	December 10, 1977
11	11	"Silent Night"	Allen Baron	Ben Joelson & Art Baer	December 10, 1977
11	11	"Divorce Me, Please"	Allen Baron	Bruce Howard	December 10, 1977
At Christmas, a lonely Captain Stubing alienates the crew by his lack of Christmas spirit. Ex-convict Dan Barton (John Gavin) meets his double-crossing law partner Walter Perry (Dean Santoro) on board and plans to get revenge, for being convicted of the crime the partner committed. Paul and Audrey Baynes (Shecky Greene, Florence Henderson) fantasize about divorcing each other. Minister Father Mike (Dick Sargent) chaperones six orphans. Guest Stars: John Gavin as Dan Barton, Shecky Greene as Paul Baynes, Florence Henderson as Audrey Baynes, Donna Mills as Lila Barton, and Dick Sargent as Father Mike. Other Guests: Dean Santoro as Walter Perry, Tiger Williams as Tony, Philip Tanzini as Peanut, Beatrice Colen as Vera, and Chanin Hale as Claire.
12	12	"Old Man and the Runaway"	Stuart Margolin	Howard Albrecht & Sol Weinstein	December 24, 1977
12	12	"The Painters"	James Sheldon	Ray Jessel	December 24, 1977
12	12	"A Fine Romance"	James Sheldon	Jack Hanrahan & Don Sherman	December 24, 1977
A curmudgeon (Will Geer) strikes up a friendship with a runaway teen (Bayn Johnson as Nancy Brown). The brother of a friend of Julie (Anson Williams) rebuffs her advances. Inept painters (Arte Johnson, Pat Morita) make a shambles of the Captain's cabin. Guest Stars: Will Geer as Franklyn Bootherstone, Arte Johnson as Ronald, Pat Morita as Vincent, Tom Poston as Mickey O'Day, and Anson Williams as Sean McGlynn. Others: Dorothy Green as Miss Westlake (uncredited)
13	13	"Cinderella Story"	Richard Kinon	Ben Joelson & Art Baer	January 7, 1978
13	13	"Too Hot to Handle"	Richard Kinon	Bruce Shelly	January 7, 1978
13	13	"Family Reunion"	James Sheldon	Bruce Shelly	January 7, 1978
Honeymooners (John Rubinstein, Kathy Bates) experience a nightmare of a honeymoon. A supermarket assistant manager (Bruce Solomon), traveling with his wife (Judy Luciano), poses as a hot-shot executive with the crew's connivance. A ship's steward (Bob Crane) is reunited with his long-lost daughter (Dori Brenner). Guest Stars: Bob Crane as Edward 'Teddy' Anderson, Rosemary DeCamp as Cynthia Loudon, Don DeFore as Everett Loudon, Robert Hays as Sam Bradley, Bruce Solomon as Bill Edwards, David White as Greg Beatty, John Rubinstein as George Allison, and Kathy Bates as Sally Allison. Other Guests: Victoria Carroll as Ginger LeDoux, Bruce Solomon as Bill Edwards, Judy Luciano as Doreen Edwards (credited as Judy Luciano Adams), and Earl Montgomery as the man on the Sun Princess.
14	14	"Isaac's Double Standard"	James Sheldon	Sue Masters and John Walsh	January 14, 1978
14	14	"One More Time"	James Sheldon	Ann Gibbs & Joel Kimmel	January 14, 1978
14	14	"Chimpanzeeshines"	Richard Kinon	Bernie Kahn	January 14, 1978
A thieving chimp almost wrecks Gopher's love life. Isaac's mother (Pearl Bailey) shocks her son by sharing quarters with her boyfriend. Feuding performers (Nanette Fabray, Don Adams) reunite for a show. Guest Stars: Pearl Bailey as Millie Washington, Don Adams as Lenny Camen, Nanette Fabray as Mitzi Monroe, Allyn Ann McLerie as Cynthia Parker, Tracy Reed as Charlene Franks (credited as Tracey Reed), and introducing Louise the Chimpanzee. Other Guests: Kim Lankford as Anne Parker and Arthur Adams as Roy Harwood, D.D.S.
15 16	15 16	"The Eyes of Love"	Allen Baron	Tony Webster	January 21, 1978
15 16	15 16	"Masquerade"	Allen Baron	Louis Pelletier and Marciia Muldoon	January 21, 1978
15 16	15 16	"Hollywood Royalty"	Allen Baron	Ray Jessel	January 21, 1978
15 16	15 16	"The Caper"	Allen Baron	Gordon & Lynne Farr and Ben Joelson & Art Baer	January 21, 1978
A Hollywood couple argues about a film he wants to produce, unaware that thieves are planning to rob them of a precious diamond in their possession. A blind girl is reunited with her schoolmate—who is no longer blind. A lawyer tries to keep his wife from finding out about his mistress who is also on the cruise. A masquerade ball highlights the conclusion of the voyage. The bumbling gang of thieves believes they have finally figured out a way to nab an elusive diamond, even as its owner comes to her own drastic decision on its fate; a blind woman wonders if she can be happy with a former blind friend, who has regained his sight; a man's wife and mistress discover who each other are. A husband and wife (Fernando Lamas, Michele Lee), a famous Hollywood couple, arrive with paparazzi. She is adorned with a famous gigantic diamond which, of course, entices dim-witted bumbling crooks (Harold Gould, Karen Valentine, Larry Storch, John Schuck), in a delightful caper reminiscent of old Hollywood. A husband (Dan Rowan) is chagrined into bringing his wife (Juliet Mills) on the cruise when she finds the tickets for his mistress (Adrienne Barbeau) and himself, with some surprises. Two former attendees of a blind school (Desi Arnaz, Jr., Stephanie Zimbalist) are reunited. A masquerade night moves the plot right along. Guest Stars: Harold Gould as Vernon Crowler, Fernando Lamas as Bill Teague, Michele Lee as Roz Rogers, Juliet Mills as Barbara Danver, Dan Rowan as Alan Danver, Adrienne Barbeau as Cathy Randall, John Schuck as Ox, Larry Storch as Elwood Riggs, Karen Valentine as Taffy Martino, Desi Arnaz, Jr. as Steve Hollis, and Stephanie Zimbalist as Jenny Lang. Other Guests: Lea Vernon as TV Reporter, John J. Fox as Chauffeur, and Richard Lineback as Steward. Others: John Hugh McKnight as Passenger (uncredited), and Paul Van as Maitre D' (uncredited). Note: This is the first time in which the opening credits included video images of the guest stars as well as names. This was the only time it occurred in the first season but it would become the standard format in subsequent seasons.
17	17	"Winner Take Love"	Jack Arnold	Kevin Hartigan and David Garber	January 28, 1978
17	17	"The Congressman Was Indiscreet"	Jack Arnold	Jack Matcha	January 28, 1978
17	17	"Isaac's History Lesson"	Jack Arnold	Fred Grandy and Bernie Kopell	January 28, 1978
A beauty contest on board ship divides a couple (Maureen McCormick, Bobby Sherman). A reporter (Vicki Lawrence) falls for a disgraced congressman (Dick Van Patten). A visiting college professor (Vernee Watson-Johnson) researching Black history disapproves of an older passenger's hambone moves – even though most of the others like it – and convinces Isaac to feel the same way until they find out to their embarrassment that the man (Scatman Crothers) is one of the greatest pitchers in Negro leagues history. Guest Stars: Scatman Crothers as Virgil "Scattergun" Gibson, Graham Jarvis as Waldo Linden, Vicki Lawrence as Robin Brandt, Dick Van Patten as Congressman John Whitcomb, Maureen McCormick as Suzy Corbett, Bobby Sherman as Rick Leonard, and Vernee Watson-Johnson as Stephanie Hayden (credited as Vernée Watson). Other Guests: Priscilla Barnes as Jeanette Arnold (credited as Jeanette), Maria O'Brien as Rita Almerez (credited as Rita), Melissa Tennille as Alma Hodges (credited as Alma), and Marianne Marks as Teresa Chen (credited as Teresa). Others: Paul DeCeglie as Passenger (uncredited), Bob Harks as Contest Judge (uncredited), and Monty O'Grady as Waiter (uncredited).
18	18	"Last of the Stubings"	Jack Arnold	Michael Norell	February 4, 1978
18	18	"Million Dollar Man"	Jack Arnold	Steve Pritzker	February 4, 1978
18	18	"The Sisters"	Jack Arnold	Ray Jessel	February 4, 1978
Captain Stubing's nephew turns out to be a klutz. An embezzler falls for a cop. Romance comes between two unmarried sisters. Stubing's nephew (Peter Isacksen) comes on board to be trained to work on ships, like everyone in his family but doesn't exactly do a good job at whatever he is told to do. Eventually, he reveals a secret to the crew that he can't tell Stubing. A man who stole a million dollars (Frank Converse) hooks up with a female passenger (Marcia Strassman) but when he reveals what he did, she reveals that she's a cop and intends to turn him in when they return. Two sisters (Pat Crowley, Marion Ross) come aboard and when one sister is attracted to a male passenger (Brett Halsey), her sister is jealous because she feels neglected. Guest Stars: Frank Converse as Bill Thompson, Marcia Strassman as Stephanie Lewis, Pat Crowley as Noreen Badger, Marion Ross as Rose Higby, Brett Halsey as Clark Tyler, and Peter Isacksen as L. Courtney Stubing IV. Other Guests: Benny Baker as Grandad 'Jack Daniels' (credited without role).
19	19	"A Very Special Girl"	Roger Duchowny	Jerry Winnick	February 11, 1978
19	19	"Until the Last Goodbye"	Roger Duchowny	Ben Joelson & Art Baer	February 11, 1978
19	19	"The Inspector"	Roger Duchowny	Bruce Howard	February 11, 1978
The crew is on its best behavior for an incognito cruise inspector while an elderly Russian man keeps asking the same phrase repeatedly. Illness affects an adoring couple (Susan Blanchard, Paul Burke). A children's book author (Jim Backus) tries to find inspiration on the cruise. Two girlfriends (Laurette Spang, Debralee Scott) cruise, and one is ignored by all the men on board while all the others hit on the other. Guest Stars: Jim Backus as Mr. Marvin Waterman, Susan Blanchard as Sarah Lambert, Paul Burke as Brian Sherwood, Patti MacLeod (wife of Gavin MacLeod) as Mrs. Corwin, Debralee Scott as Jane Cole, Laurette Spang as Melanie Taylor, Bob Seagren as Mike Andrews, and Sal Viscuso as Doug Ketchum. Other Guests: Jack Bernardi as Mr. Zidreczky and Don Bovingloh as Pianist (credited as Don Boevingloh). Others: Henry Z. Jones Jr. as Ship's Inspector (uncredited).
20	20	"Memories of You"	Richard Kinon	Carmen Finestra	February 13, 1978
20	20	"Computerman"	Richard Kinon	David Assael	February 13, 1978
20	20	"Parlez Vous?"	Richard Kinon	Mark Fink	February 13, 1978
A matchmaker uses a computer to pair up the cruise guests. He also manipulates it to pair himself with Julie. American gold diggers pass themselves off as French. A New York ad executive and a long-lost love reunite. Two American women (Barbi Benton, Susan Silo) pretend they are French, to get men and gifts. Julie is wooed by a man (Frankie Avalon) who runs a computer-dating service and offers his computer matchmaking for the Valentine's Day cruise. A woman (Patty Duke Astin) believes another passenger (Ricky Nelson), who has amnesia, is a former lost love. Guest Stars: Patty Duke as Lilly Mackim (credited as Patty Duke Astin), Frankie Avalon as Nick Heider, Barbi Benton as Brigitte LeBlanc, Denny Evans as Sam Worth, Jamie Farr as Seymour, Ricky Nelson as Ted Wilcox / Alex Fowler (credited as Rick Nelson), and Carole White as Penny Jacobs (credited as Carole Ita White). Other Guests: Shelley Long as Heather McKenzie (credited as Heather), Lawrence P. Casey as Daryl Matson (credited as Lawrence Casey; credited as Daryl), Susan Silo as Yvonne Boulanger (credited as Yvonne), Danny Dayton as Walt, and Georganne LaPiere as Betsy Carruthers (credited as Georganne La Piere; credited as Betsy). Others: Tom Brumley as himself – Steel Guitarist.
21	21	"Taking Sides"	Richard Kinon	Hugh Wedlock, Jr.	February 18, 1978
21	21	"Going by the Book"	Richard Kinon	Jerry Winnick	February 18, 1978
21	21	"A Friendly Little Game"	Richard Kinon	Ray Brenner	February 18, 1978
Older Max and Gladys (Robert Mandan and Audrey Meadows) turns newlyweds Scott and Denise (Robert Urich and Diana Canova) against one another with bickering. Howard (Harvey Jason) uses a dating manual to hit on young Sheila (Georgia Engel). Cardsharp Wendell (Harry Morgan) cheats the crew to pay the passage for him and his wife Ida (Priscilla Morrill). Also guest starring: Herb Voland and Paul Sylvan
22	22	"A Selfless Love"	Roger Duchowny	Phil Foster and Marion Zola	February 25, 1978
22	22	"The Nubile Nurse"	Roger Duchowny	Barry Blitzer	February 25, 1978
22	22	"Parents Know Best"	Roger Duchowny	Fred S. Fox and Seaman Jacobs	February 25, 1978
A couple (Monty Hall and Janis Paige) takes their son (Mark Shera) along on the cruise, hoping he will end a relationship; A couple (Leslie Nielsen and Lynda Day George) rethink their romance; An ex-showgirl (Elaine Joyce) jeopardizes her nursing career. Also guest starring: Laurie Prange, Marla Adams, Craig Littler, Dorothy Konrad, Joe E. Ross
23	23	"Musical Cabins"	Allen Baron	Michael Norell	May 6, 1978
In order to claim an inheritance, a young bachelor (Paul Williams) has a week to marry; A widow (Michele Lee), posing as an adventuress, captures the Captain's heart; A chauvinist (Richard Gautier) angers his fiancée (Barbara Rhoades), who finds comfort in Doc; A tabloid reporter (Marcia Wallace) uses sex as the subject for her story.
24	24	"This Business of Love"	Roger Duchowny	Howard Albrecht & Sol Weinstein	May 13, 1978
24	24	"Crash Diet Crush"	Roger Duchowny	Ray Jessel	May 13, 1978
24	24	"I'll Never Fall in Love Again"	Roger Duchowny	Ann Gibbs & Joel Kimmel	May 13, 1978
A former prostitute (Caren Kaye) trying to overcome her past meets a nice man (Christopher George) but is threatened with exposure by a former client (Jack Carter) having troubles with his wife (Jayne Meadows). Captain Stubing reunites with an old flame (Jessica Walter). Two depressed widowed people (Annette Funicello, Michael Callan) find comfort in each other while avoiding an overly happy couple (Morey Amsterdam, Rose Marie).
25	25	"Pacific Princess Overtures"	Allen Baron	Dawn Aldredge & Martin Cohan	May 20, 1978
25	25	"Gopher, the Rebel"	Allen Baron	Ray Jessel	May 20, 1978
25	25	"Cabin Fever"	Allen Baron	Ann Gibbs & Joel Kimmel	May 20, 1978
Gopher is encouraged by a young passenger (Eve Plumb) to stand up to Captain Stubing, with unexpected consequences; A man (Antonio Fargas) is caught cheating on his wife, by his neighbors – from home; A businessman (Gary Collins) convinces a widow (Diane Baker) to sell her late husband's business to a Japanese conglomerate, whose chairman (Pat Morita) is on board.

=== Season 2 (1978–79) ===
No. overall	No. in season	Title	Directed by	Written by	Original release date
26 27	1 2	"Marooned"	Paul Stanley	Michael Norell	September 16, 1978
26 27	1 2	"The Search"	Paul Stanley	Lee Aronsohn	September 16, 1978
26 27	1 2	"Isaac's Holiday"	Paul Stanley	Ben Joelson & Art Baer	September 16, 1978
Part 1: Captain Stubing's deputy turns out to be incompetent in his new role. The captain, Doc, Julie, Gopher, and some of the guests visit an island near Cabo San Lucas. They are taken hostage by a nutty hermit (John Astin) and caught in a hurricane. Gopher, who is anxious about his upcoming vacation, drives everyone crazy. Isaac sails on the ship as a passenger and hopes to impress a woman with his lies about being rich and famous. A passenger tracks down a woman who gave her up as a newborn and also meets a soap-opera actor. Part 2: The captain and his marooned group struggle to survive on the island during a hurricane. The woman (Donna Mills) looking for her birth mother (Laraine Day) makes a startling discovery. Isaac tries to save the ship from the storm while trying to regain Mara's (Lola Falana) trust. Guest Stars: Edie Adams as Maureen Buell, John Astin as David P. Crothers, Barbi Benton as Kiki Atwood, David Birney as Mike Adler, Norm Crosby as Wally the Bartender, Donna Mills as Jeannie Carter, Laraine Day as Vera Simpson, Lola Falana as Mara Carroll, Audra Lindley as Mrs. Worth, Dick Martin as Deputy Captain Cunningham, and Avery Schreiber as Everett Buell. Other Guests: Gordon Connell as Douglas the chauffeur (credit only), and Chris Capen as Radio Officer (credit only).
28	3	"Rocky"	Allen Baron	Ann Gibbs and Joel Kimmel	September 23, 1978
28	3	"Julie's Dilemma"	Roger Duchowny	Ben Joelson and Art Baer	September 23, 1978
28	3	"Who's Who?"	Roger Duchowny	Bob Fraser and Rob Dames	September 23, 1978
Julie's parents (Norman Fell and Betty Garrett) are getting divorced. An author (James Coco) and a censor (Dody Goodman) fall in love, unaware they are sharing the same cabin. A young girl (Melissa Gilbert) loses her tomboy image after receiving her first kiss. Guest Stars: Jimmy Baio as Norman, James Coco as Marion Atkins, the Author, Norman Fell as Bill McCoy, Betty Garrett as Martha McCoy, Melissa Gilbert as Rosemary 'Rocky' Simpson, Dody Goodman as Patricia Seldon, Ellen Travolta as Norman's Mother, and Edward Winter as Rod Simpson. Other Guests: Marla Adams as Arlene Simpson. Others: Emmaline Henry as Love Interest for 'Billy Boy' (uncredited).
29	4	"The Man Who Loved Women"	Allen Baron	Howard Albrecht and Sol Weinstein	September 30, 1978
29	4	"A Different Girl"	Allen Baron	Cynthia Santillo	September 30, 1978
29	4	"Oh, My Aching Brother"	Allen Baron	Bruce Howard	September 30, 1978
A man (David Doyle) makes a move on and falls in love with three passengers (Cathryn Damon, Brett Somers, Jo Ann Pflug), whom he doesn't know are traveling together. During separate introductions, they individually refer to him as 'Cornelious,' 'McNair,' and 'Vinny,' respectively. Captain Stubing's godson (Grant Goodeve) and his wife (Bess Armstrong) are cruising together after being separated for two years by his military duties overseas. Two brothers, Harold and Joe Nash (Sonny Bono and Marty Ingels) stage false injuries so they can sue the insurance company, but Harold has a change of heart when he meets a nice lady (Judy Landers). Guest Stars: Grant Goodeve as Captain Dave Stanton, Bess Armstrong as Laura Stanton, Sonny Bono as Harold Nash, Marty Ingels as Joe Nash, Judy Landers as Rita, David Doyle as Alvin McNair, Cathryn Damon as Charlotte, Jo Ann Pflug as Bonnie Stokes, and Brett Somers as Anita Carmichael.
30	5	"Julie's Aunt"	Allen Baron	Barry Blitzer	October 14, 1978
30	5	"Where Is It Written?"	Allen Baron	Lan O'Kun	October 14, 1978
30	5	"The Big Deal"	Allen Baron	James F. Henry	October 14, 1978
Captain Stubing's uncle (Red Buttons) makes efforts to be alone with Julie but is thwarted by her aunt – Gopher in disguise; A businessman (Allen Ludden) tries to close a deal, using his daughter (Mackenzie Phillips) as bait; The neglected wife (Hope Lange) of a publisher (Gene Barry) hopes to find inspiration for the remaining chapter of a book by romancing a novelist (Richard Mulligan). Guest Stars: Sam Groom, Erik Estrada
31	6	"Mike and Ike"	Roger Duchowny	Fred Grandy and Bernie Kopell	October 21, 1978
31	6	"The Witness"	Roger Duchowny	Arnold Grossman	October 21, 1978
31	6	"The Kissing Bandit"	Allen Baron	Fred Grandy and Bernie Kopell	October 21, 1978
A shy young man becomes a different person at night; a businessman learns a lesson about neglecting his family; a man believes he has better chances of surviving at sea than on trial. A shy guy (Billy Crystal) dons a mask and goes around kissing every girl on the ship. Then, he meets a girl (Laurie Walters) with whom he connects. A couple (Marilyn McCoo, Billy Davis Jr.), who are friends of Isaac's and with whom they performed on the streets in their youth, are now successful and rich and have a young son (Todd Bridges). But his father spends more time on work than with his son. And a woman (Toni Tennille) follows a man (Robert Reed), whom she knows witnessed what happened to someone she cares about and urges him to come forward and tell what he saw. Guest Stars: Billy Crystal as Newton Weems, Laurie Walters as Roberta Potter, Sharon Acker as Evelyn, Todd Bridges as Michael Jr., Marilyn McCoo as Lenore, Billy Davis Jr. as Michael Sr., Pat Carroll as Muriel, Nancy Kulp as Gert, Toni Tennille as Suzanne Henderson, and Robert Reed as Frank McLean. Note: Isaac, Lenore, and Michael Sr. complete a song and dance scene later credited as "Our Language of Love," words by Fred Grandy and music by Ray Jessel.
32	7	"Ship of Ghouls"	Roger Duchowny	Mickey Rose	October 28, 1978
An illusionist is in such demand that he nearly misses what is in front of him; two recently reunited parents have trouble trying to stop their son from telling tall tales; Julie's model friend, scarred physically and psychologically by a car crash, is romanced by Gopher and Doc but is suspicious of their motives. Guest Stars: Iris Adrian as The Amazing Alonzo Groupie, Charlie Aiken as Bobby Diller, Barbara Anderson as Karen Williamson, Joan Blondell as Ramona Bevans, Gary Collins as Mr. Diller, Jane Kean as The Amazing Alonzo Groupie, Mary Ann Mobley as Mrs. Diller, Bibi Osterwald as The Amazing Alonzo Groupie and Vincent Price as Wendell Mordan – 'The Amazing Alonzo.' Other Guests: Maureen Reagan as Mrs. Moss and Larry Gelman as Harvey Greenswann (credited as Harvey). Others: unknown girl (uncredited) as Lucy, daughter to Mrs. Moss and cruise ship friend to Bobby Diller.
33	8	"A Time for Everything"	Roger Duchowny	Lee Aronsohn	November 4, 1978
33	8	"The Song Is Ended"	Roger Duchowny	Lan O'Kun	November 4, 1978
33	8	"Accidental Cruise"	Roger Duchowny	Steve Hattman and Dave Hackel	November 4, 1978
33	8	"Anoushka"	Roger Duchowny	Michael Norell	November 4, 1978
A stuffy executive loosens up and falls in love with his secretary; a songwriter rekindles a wife's love for her husband; Captain Stubing takes charge of the orphaned child of his former love; a stern Russian cruise director gets a new image, to Doc's delight. Sandy Beal (Jo Anne Worley) is a secretary secretly in love with her boss Victor Marshall (Soupy Sales). The two of them get drunk at an office party and take an "Accidental Cruise." In "The Song Has Ended," Charlie Godwin (Robert Goulet) is a former songwriter now unhappily married and working for an advertising agency. Once they board the ship, Charlie and his wife June (Juliet Mills) encounter his former partner Burt Buchanan (Richard Dawson), who has gone on to garner more fame than he had with Charlie. "A Time for Everything" reunites Captain Stubing with Dolores (Sandra Deel), whose sister Georgina was an old flame of Stubing's and died eight months earlier, leaving Georgina's daughter Vicki (Jill Whelan) in Dolores' care. Miss "Anoushka" Mishancov (Loretta Swit), the vodka-loving Commissar of Cruise Vessels for the Soviet Union, is on board and falls for Doc, after persuading Julie to help her become "slinky." Guest Stars: Jo Anne Worley as Sandy Beal, Soupy Sales as Victor Marshall, Robert Goulet as Charlie Godwin, Juliet Mills as June Godwin, Richard Dawson as Bert Buchanan, Jill Whelan as Vicki Stubing, and Loretta Swit as Anoushka Mishancov. Other Guests: Melendy Britt as Georgina and Sandra Deel as Dolores Strickland. Others: Lawrence Moran as Jimmy (uncredited). Note: This is the first appearance of Vicki. Note: This is a 90-minute episode.
34	9	"Till Death Do Us Part–Maybe"	Allen Baron	Ben Joelson and Art Baer	November 11, 1978
34	9	"Locked Away"	Allen Baron	Howard Albrecht and Sol Weinstein	November 11, 1978
34	9	"Chubs"	Allen Baron	Loraine Despres	November 11, 1978
A widow (Vernee Watson-Johnson) who still hasn't gotten over her husband's death is followed by her husband's ghost (Jimmie Walker), who tries to fix her up with another passenger (Greg Morris). A divorced couple (Janet Leigh, Conrad Bain) sees their daughter (Jamie Lee Curtis) and her husband (Peter Coffield) off but get locked in one of the unused cabins. Gopher's sister (Melissa Sue Anderson) comes on board and makes a beeline for Doc. Guest Stars: Vernee Watson-Johnson as Ellen Garner (credited as Vernee Watson), Jimmie Walker as The Late Mickey Garner, Greg Morris as Greg Elkins, Conrad Bain as Les, Jamie Lee Curtis as Linda, Janet Leigh as Gail, and Melissa Sue Anderson as Jennifer 'Chubs' Smith. Other Guests: Peter Coffield as Wayne, Bebe Drake-Hooks as Mrs. Cory, Raymond Allen as Mr. Cory, and Deney Terrio as Floyd.
35	10	"Man of the Cloth"	Richard Kinon	Fred S. Fox and Seaman Jacobs	November 17, 1978
35	10	"Her Own Two Feet"	Richard Kinon	Ann Gibbs and Joel Kimmel	November 17, 1978
35	10	"Tony's Family"	Richard Kinon	Henry Colman	November 17, 1978
A minister falls for a Las Vegas exotic dancer, much to the dismay of a female parishioner, who attempts to break them up but causes a strain on her marriage; a man tries to help his wife overcome her denial over her blindness; the crew convinces the chief engineer to forgo his Thanksgiving holiday by having his entire family stow away on board the ship. Guest Stars: June Allyson, Vivian Blaine, Peter Graves, Van Johnson, Roz Kelly, Larry Storch, Alan Young, Mitzi Hoag, Tony La Torre, Renata Vanni, Mario Bellini, Jennifer Surprenant, Kelly Greenwood
36	11	"Heads or Tails"	Buddy Tyne	Ann Gibbs and Joel Kimmel	November 25, 1978
36	11	"Mona of the Movies"	Buddy Tyne	Howard Albrecht and Sol Weinstein	November 25, 1978
36	11	"The Little People"	Buddy Tyne	Barry Blitzer	November 25, 1978
A movie queen (Rhonda Fleming) intimidates a businessman (Orson Bean); two swingers (Richard Gilliland, Adam Arkin) go after Julie and make a bet as to whom she will fall for; a man (Edward Albert) treats his parents to the cruise (Billy Barty, Patty Maloney) for their 25th wedding anniversary. He strikes up a romance with a lady from his work (Patty McCormack) until he finds she is uncomfortable around "little people", i.e. the man's parents.
37	12	"The Captain's Cup"	Alan Rafkin	Ben Joelson & Art Baer	December 2, 1978
37	12	"The Folks from Home"	Alan Rafkin	Fred Grandy & Bernie Kopell	December 2, 1978
37	12	"Legal Eagle"	Alan Rafkin	Gordon Farr	December 2, 1978
A woman in charge of the presentation of the Captain's Cup convinces an engineer to pose as the executive in charge so as not to disappoint Captain Stubing; Doc begins spending all of his time with an older couple from his hometown; a recently divorced man is paired up with his ex's divorce attorney. The Captain is expecting a prestigious award but the presenter (Pat Harrington Jr.) may not be who he expects it to be. Doc becomes attached to an elderly couple (John McIntire, Jeanette Nolan) from his hometown, only to have to perform a life-threatening operation on the woman. A recently divorced man (Bert Convy) runs into the lawyer (Leigh Taylor-Young) who represented his ex-wife in the divorce. Guest Stars: Pat Harrington Jr. as Hank Vosnick (credited as Pat Harrington), Florence Henderson as Diane DiMarzo, John McIntire as George Hancock, Jeanette Nolan as Gloria Hancock, Bert Convy as Danny Holt, and Leigh Taylor-Young as Ann Sterling (credited as Leigh Taylor Young). Other Guests: Cisse Cameron as Amber, George Petrie as Dr. David Barnes (credited as Dr. Barnes), and Chris Capen as Radio Officer.
38	13	"El Kid"	Allen Baron	Barry Blitzer	December 9, 1978
38	13	"The Last Hundred Bucks"	Allen Baron	Ray Jessel	December 9, 1978
38	13	"Isosceles Triangle"	Allen Baron	Mark Fink	December 9, 1978
A couple and their friend meet a former marketing executive who is penniless and looking for work. A couple looking to adopt a child in Puerto Vallarta gets the sad news the biological parents had a change of heart but the director of the orphanage has another child in mind. A friend of Julie's is romanced by both Doc and the Captain; Isaac and Gopher take sides and even bet their last $100 on the outcome. Guest stars: Dabney Coleman, Dena Dietrich, Dave Madden, Rue McClanahan, Gabriel Melgar, Heather Menzies, Connie Stevens, Robert Urich, Victor Millan, David Clover, Keith Allison
39	14	"Julie Falls Hard"	Bob Claver	Michael Norell	December 16, 1978
39	14	"Double Wedding"	Bob Claver	Ray Jessel	December 16, 1978
39	14	"The Dummies"	Bob Claver	Lan O'Kun	December 16, 1978
A double wedding is in store for identical twins; A separated couple argues through their ventriloquist act; Julie settles an argument between two adolescent girls, to the pleasure of their father, and the girls then decide to fix up with him and Julie. Julie falls in love with a man (Tony Roberts) and his daughters (Annrae Walterhouse, Melora Hardin). Will she leave the ship for Alaska? Twins (Cyb Barnstable, Trish Barnstable), unhappy with their prospective spouses (David Nelson, Fred Travalena), switch places. A separate couple (Ruth Buzzi, Sid Caesar) are assigned to the same cabin, so they and their ventriloquist dummies entertain the passengers. Guest Stars: Tony Roberts as Jack Chenault, Priscilla Barnstable as Judy Barrett (credited as Cyb Barnstable), Patricia Barnstable as Joanie Barrett (credited as Trish Barnstable), David Nelson as Gary Gage, Fred Travalena as Ted Ashton, Ruth Buzzi as Patti Harmon, and Sid Caesar as Michael Harmon. Other Guests: Annrae Waterhouse as Ashley Chenault (credited as Ashley) and Melora Hardin as Courtney Chenault (credited as Courtney).
40	15	"My Sister, Irene"	Roger Duchowny	Tony Webster	January 13, 1979
40	15	"The 'Now' Marriage"	Roger Duchowny	Story by : Howard Albrecht & Sol Weinstein; Teleplay by : Ray Jessel	January 13, 1979
40	15	"Second Time Around"	Roger Duchowny	Tony Webster	January 13, 1979
A woman poses as her sister to avoid an old flame. An author tries to live up to the philosophies he espoused in his recent work. One of Doc's ex-wives hires an actor to pose as her fiancé to win him back. Irene Austin (Martha Raye) agrees to meet her college classmate, Andy Hopkins (Ray Bolger), after 40 years. She then panics and tells him she's Irene's sister. Dr. Todd Gardiner (Peter Marshall) wrote a book about open marriage, but finds his union to Eleanor Gardiner (Barbara Rush) in jeopardy, as he gets close to a fellow passenger (Phyllis Davis). Doc's ex-wife (Tina Louise) arrives with a new fiancé (Lyle Waggoner). Guest Stars: Martha Raye as Irene Austin, Ray Bolger as Andy Hopkins, Peter Marshall as Dr. Todd Gardiner, Barbara Rush as Eleanor Gardiner, Phyllis Davis as Nancy Bishop, Tina Louise as Betty Bricker, and Lyle Waggoner as Lance Wilson.
41	16	"Gopher's Opportunity"	Roger Duchowny	Sue Masters and John Walsh	January 20, 1979
41	16	"The Switch"	Roger Duchowny	Lan O'Kun	January 20, 1979
41	16	"Home Sweet Home"	Allen Baron	Ray Jessel and Natalie Schafer	January 20, 1979
Gopher's friend offers him a job at a plush hotel in Lake Havasu City, Arizona; Gopher considers it after an argument with the Captain. A magician's assistant is upset when he sends his brother to replace him in the act. A dowager is attracted to a cabin steward. Guest Stars: Elaine Joyce as Melody Livingston, Melinda Naud as Maggie Walsh, Ron Palillo as Al Breyer, Bobby Van as Phil Livingston, Abe Vigoda as Charlie Fletcher, and Nancy Walker as Hetty Waterhouse. Other Guests: Michael Gregory as Ken Breyer (credited as Ken).
42	17	"Second Chance"	Allen Baron	Lee Aronsohn	January 27, 1979
42	17	"Don't Push Me"	Allen Baron	Barbara Evans	January 27, 1979
42	17	"Like Father, Like Son"	Allen Baron	Jerry Winnick	January 27, 1979
Isaac worries that a young woman on probation (Debbi Morgan), working in the gift shop, has stolen some jewelry. A henpecked man (Roddy McDowall) feels he's being pressured, by his girlfriend (Tammy Grimes), into marriage, against his will. A charming widower and his son (Robert Mandan, Randolph Mantooth) fall in love with the same woman (Cathy Lee Crosby). Guest Stars: Debbi Morgan as Stephanie Jackson, Virginia Graham as Gift Shop Customer, Roddy McDowall as Fred Beery, Tammy Grimes as Christine, Robert Mandan as Woody Billingsley, Randolph Mantooth as Alan Billingsley, and Cathy Lee Crosby as Libby Hall.
43 44	18 19	"Alas, Poor Dwyer"	Roger Duchowny	Ray Jessel	February 3, 1979
43 44	18 19	"After the War"	Roger Duchowny	Barry Blitzer	February 3, 1979
43 44	18 19	"Itsy Bitsy"	Roger Duchowny	Carmen Finestra	February 3, 1979
43 44	18 19	"Ticket to Ride"	Roger Duchowny	Joyce Armor & Judie Neer	February 3, 1979
43 44	18 19	"Disco Baby"	Roger Duchowny	Howard Albrecht & Sol Weinstein	February 3, 1979
Julie is driving everyone crazy since she is organizing her high school reunion on board ship: 1. Julie's high school teacher is on board but is struggling with his alcoholism.; 2. A former boyfriend of hers is on board with her high school rival.; 3. The football quarterback is reunited with his former teammates.; 4. Another couple, who had moved to Canada for him to avoid the Vietnam War draft and recently returned under amnesty, meet another classmate who is in a wheelchair due to wounds received in the war.; 5. Doc romances one of Julie's classmates.; 6. Julie learns her recently divorced friend Wendy is on the cruise because an unknown admirer has sent her the cruise ticket.; Guest stars: Raymond Burr, Michael Cole, Kim Darby, Bob Denver, Conchata Ferrell, Christopher George, Lisa Hartman, Michael Lembeck, Kelly Monteith, John Rubinstein, Judi West, David Landsberg.
45	20	"Best of Friends"	George Tyne	Fred S. Fox and Seaman Jacobs	February 10, 1979
45	20	"Aftermath"	George Tyne	Story by : Sue Masters and John Walsh; Teleplay by : Lee Aronsohn	February 10, 1979
45	20	"Dream Boat"	George Tyne	Bruce Howard	February 10, 1979
Doc's old mentor from Johns Hopkins disapproves of his lifestyle while dealing with the loss of an arm in a car crash, not realizing his wife has become addicted to painkillers; a series of misunderstandings strains an engaged couple and the woman's best friend. A representative from the cruise ship Lorelei evaluates the Captain as a possible commanding officer for that ship. Guest stars: Richard Anderson, Joyce Brothers, Hans Conried, Carol Lynley, Diana Muldaur, Ben Murphy, Donna Pescow, Mary Farrell, Starr Hester
46	21	"A Good and Faithful Servant"	Roger Duchowny	Bruce Howard	February 17, 1979
46	21	"The Secret Life of Burl Smith"	Roger Duchowny	Barry Blitzer	February 17, 1979
46	21	"Tug of War"	Roger Duchowny	Ben Joelson and Art Baer	February 17, 1979
46	21	"Designated Lover"	Roger Duchowny	Bob Fraser and Rob Dames	February 17, 1979
A vacationing chauffeur and his wealthy employer fall in love; a famous model causes love-smitten Gopher to fantasize that he is various flamboyant heroes; a separated couple vies for their son's affection; Reggie Jackson (as himself) can't convince anyone on board that he is who he says he is. Note: This is a 90-minute episode. Guest stars: John Mills, Hayley Mills, Juliet Mills, Telma Hopkins, David Hedison, Celeste Holm, Keith Coogan
47	22	"Love Me, Love My Dog"	Roger Duchowny	Barry Blitzer	February 24, 1979
47	22	"Poor Little Rich Girl"	Roger Duchowny	Ben Joelson and Art Baer	February 24, 1979
47	22	"The Decision"	Roger Duchowny	Henry Colman	February 24, 1979
A terrier "protects" its mistress from the advances of a gentleman; a waitress inherits a fortune and finds her new life, and her former fiancé's renewed interest, a big adjustment; Isaac laments his ill-fated love affairs. Guest stars: Debbie Allen, Dennis Cole, Fannie Flagg, Maren Jensen, Gene Rayburn, Cricket, Noah Keen.
48	23	"Funny Valentine"	George Tyne	Fred Grandy and Bernie Kopell	March 3, 1979
48	23	"The Wallflower"	George Tyne	Ben Joelson and Art Baer	March 3, 1979
48	23	"A Home is Not a Home"	George Tyne	John V. Hanrahan and Tom Dagenais	March 3, 1979
A wallflower is secretly followed by a shy milquetoast; Stubing is charmed by a fortune-teller; two honeymooning retirees are unexpectedly joined by their overprotective children. Guest stars: Warren Berlinger, Elinor Donahue, Patty Dworkin, Samantha Eggar, Arthur Godfrey, Minnie Pearl, Zane Lasky, Dorrie Thomson.
49	24	"Ages of Man"	Richard Kinon	Lsn O'Kun	March 10, 1979
49	24	"Bo 'n Sam"	Richard Kinon	Ben Joelson and Art Baer	March 10, 1979
49	24	"Families"	Richard Kinon	Howard Albrecht and Sol Weinstein	March 10, 1979
Julie falls for an older man while an adolescent boy falls for her; two rival publishers clash while their children become romantic; the crew's plans for a present for their captain's anniversary keep hitting a huge snag. Guest stars: Paul Burke, Arlene Dahl, Patrick Labyorteaux, Leslie Nielsen, Mark Shera, Philip Charles MacKenzie, Michael Tucci, Ellen Bry, James Dobson, James Hackett, Bill Smillie
50	25	"Murder on the High Seas"	Richard Kinon	Margie Peters	March 17, 1979
50	25	"Sounds of Silence"	Richard Kinon	Joyce Armor and Judie Neer	March 17, 1979
50	25	"Cyrano de Bricker"	Richard Kinon	Howard Albrecht and Sol Weinstein	March 17, 1979
A rocker meets and falls in love with a deaf girl; a gambler in marital trouble gets Doc to tell his wife how he feels; Isaac mistakes a conversation by two writers about an upcoming mystery-murder novel as an actual plot to kill the captain. Guest stars: Sonny Bono, Charlie Callas, Arte Johnson, Peter Lawford, Jill St. John, Dana Wynter, Sheila Lenham, James Dobson.
51	26	"April's Return"	George Tyne	Lee Aronsohn	May 5, 1979
51	26	"Super Mom"	George Tyne	Tom Dunsmuir	May 5, 1979
51	26	"I'll See You Again"	George Tyne	Lee Aronsohn	May 5, 1979
An old war buddy of the captain's is reunited with a long-lost love from that period; a couple on their second honeymoon have their four children with them; April (Charo), now a successful singer with the cruise line, tries her hand at cruise directing, without much success. Other Guest stars: Cyd Charisse, Anne Meara, Craig Stevens, Jerry Stiller, Katy Kurtzman, Corey Feldman, Stephen Schnetzer, Speedy Zapata, Greg Robblee.
52	27	"Third Wheel"	Gordon Farr	Lee Aronsohn	May 12, 1979
52	27	"Grandmother's Day"	Gordon Farr	Ann Gibbs and Joel Kimmel	May 12, 1979
52	27	"Second String Mom"	Gordon Farr	Lee Aronsohn	May 12, 1979
Gopher's parents visit but the father feels like a third wheel; a couple with five already grown children find out they will have a new addition to the family; two sisters are less than friendly to their new stepmother. Guest stars: Ken Berry, Robert Cummings, Nanette Fabray, Beth Howland, Ethel Merman, Barry Nelson, Michele Tobin, Shelly Juttner.

=== Season 3 (1979–80) ===
No. overall	No. in season	Title	Directed by	Written by	Original release date
53 54	1 2	"Buddy & Portia's story"	Roger Duchovny	Ben Joelson & Art Baer	September 15, 1979
53 54	1 2	"Julie's story"	Roger Duchovny	Ray Jessel	September 15, 1979
53 54	1 2	"Carol & Doug's story"	Roger Duchovny	Lee Aronsohn	September 15, 1979
53 54	1 2	"Peter & Alicia's story"	Roger Duchovny	Lan O'Kun	September 15, 1979
This wedding cruise takes place up the Alaska and British Columbia coastline: The couple getting married (Mark Harmon, Lisa Hartman) have to deal with his interfering ex-girlfriend Natalie (Caren Kaye).; The groom's divorced parents (Ray Milland, Eleanor Parker) quarrel while he is suffering from terminal cancer and she has to declare bankruptcy. Both try to keep their problems from one another.; Julie is deciding on accepting Jack's (Tony Roberts) proposal (from Season 2 episode "Julie Falls Hard") while fending off the advances of the best man of this wedding (Donny Most).; The grandfather of the bride (Lorne Greene) and the aunt of the groom (Audra Lindley) fall in love and get married.; Other guest stars: Robert Lussier, Stephanie Steele, and Julia Duffy.
55	3	"The Grass Is Always Greener"	Alan Rafkin	Jan Jessel	September 22, 1979
55	3	"Three Stages of Love"	Alan Rafkin	Tom Dunsmuir	September 22, 1979
55	3	"Oldies But Goodies"	Alan Rafkin	Rob Dames & Bob Fraser	September 22, 1979
A woman and her man-hunting daughter arrive on the ship, the mother is attracted to a disabled man but their relationship is hampered by his snobby and obnoxious aide. Julie thinks she's opted for the wrong career when she meets her happily married friend who took the cruise director course with her, especially when she feels that Capt. Stubing is overly friendly to the woman. A man feels that he and his wife are experiencing the three stages of love. Guest stars: Amanda Blake, Karen Morrow, Barry Sullivan, Werner Klemperer, Eddie Mekka, Lani O'Grady, Joan Hackett, Adam Rich.
56	4	"Going my way"	James Sheldon	Haskell Barkin	September 29, 1979
56	4	"Dance with Me"	James Sheldon	Carmen Finestra	September 29, 1979
56	4	"Doc, be patient"	Alan Rafkin	Ben Joelson & Art Baer	September 29, 1979
A vacationing doctor cares for an ailing Doc, and he falls for her; A former dancer asks her reluctant ex-partner to teach with her at her school in Germany—much to the annoyance of his new and younger partner; After being stood up, a woman brings her cab driver along on the cruise. Guest stars: Starr Danias, Arlene Golonka, Buddy Hackett, Carol Lawrence, John Meehan, Susan Sullivan.
57	5	"The Audit Couple"	Jack Arnold	Rob Dames & Bob Fraser	October 6, 1979
57	5	"The Scoop"	Jack Arnold	Howard Albrecht & Sol Weinstein	October 6, 1979
57	5	"My Boyfriend's Back"	Jack Arnold	Joyce Armor & Judie Neer	October 6, 1979
An IRS agent Viola (Phyllis Diller) comes on board to audit the Captain. A celebrity Jackie (Joyce DeWitt) tries to avoid a tabloid reporter (Ray Buktenica) trying to uncover her secret. Newlyweds Danny and Patricia (Richard Kline, Jennifer Salt) discover their ex Jay (Lyle Waggoner) is also on the cruise and wants to win her back. Other guest stars: Shane Butterworth, David Matthau, Virginia Hawkins (uncredited). Richard Kline and Joyce DeWitt also starred in Three's Company.
58	6	"Gopher's Greatest Hits"	Alan Rafkin	Lee Aronsohn	October 13, 1979
58	6	"One Rose a Day"	Alan Rafkin	Henry Colman	October 13, 1979
58	6	"The Vacation"	Alan Rafkin	Ann Gibbs and Joel Kimmel	October 13, 1979
Gopher agrees to take over for a sick performer but he finds out that his vocal cords are not the most entertaining factor in his act. Two sisters (Joanna Cassidy & Jaye P. Morgan) who usually take the cruise together are joined by one sister's husband Byron (Conrad Janis). When he finds out about the prior trips they have taken, he learns more about trust in the institution of marriage. When a widow Janet (Martha Scott) meets the man Henry (Don Ameche) responsible for sending her a remembrance even after her husband's death, she is in for a heartrending surprise.
59	7	"The Reunion"	George Tyne	Ben Joelson and Art Baer	October 20, 1979
59	7	"Haven't I Seen You?"	George Tyne	Lee Aronsohn	October 20, 1979
59	7	"Crew Confessions"	George Tyne	Bob Fraser and Rob Dames	October 20, 1979
Isaac has trouble on the high seas when the Love Boat crew discovers he has included some racy tales about them in his new novel. A man (Don Knotts) who closely resembles a celebrity starts to enjoy his new identity when a strikingly beautiful passenger (Julie Newmar) showers him with love. A husband and wife (Jane Wyatt and Jean Pierre Aumont) are reunited after being separated during World War II.
60	8	"Play by Play"	James Sheldon	Barry Blitzer	October 27, 1979
60	8	"Cindy"	James Sheldon	Michael Norell	October 27, 1979
60	8	"What's a Brother For?"	James Sheldon	Tom Dunsmuir	October 27, 1979
Gopher plays fairy godmother to a girl (Melissa Sue Anderson) vacationing with the proverbial wicked step-family (Carolyn Jones, Rhonda Bates, & Lila Kent) and gets her an audition with the Prince of Pop (Frank Sinatra Jr.). A competing couple (Christopher George, Linda Day George) do athletic feats to see who is the weaker sex. A man (Tom Hallick) traveling with his invalid brother (Patrick Wayne) meets a lovely woman (Joan Van Ark) but his budding romance with her is nearly ruined by his feeling of neglecting his brother – which the brother does little to discourage.
61	9	"Trial Romance"	Gordon Farr	Tony Webster	November 3, 1979
61	9	"Never Say Goodbye"	Gordon Farr	Lee Aronsohn	November 3, 1979
61	9	"A New Woman"	Gordon Farr	Howard Albrecht and Sol Weinstein	November 3, 1979
The Captain and Vicki (Jill Whelan) are reunited now that he has confirmation of what they have long suspected. An older woman (Gale Storm) who wants to "get with it" seeks advice from Julie, but the coaching backfires when Rose falls for Doc leaving one suitor behind (Louis Nye). He on the other hand mistakes Julie's attempts to fix him up with the lady as affection for him and feels uncomfortable with too young an admirer. A man and a woman (Vic Tayback and Jo Ann Pflug) who were on the same deadlocked jury meet again. Unfortunately, the two can't stand each other because of personal idiosyncrasies, but make the most of the situation on the high seas. Also guest starring Sandra Deel.
62 63	10 11	"Critical Success"	Roger Duchowny	Ben Joelson & Art Baer	November 10, 1979
62 63	10 11	"The Love Lamp Is Lit"	Roger Duchowny	Ben Joelson & Art Baer	November 10, 1979
62 63	10 11	"Take My Boyfriend, Please"	Roger Duchowny	Ben Joelson & Art Baer	November 10, 1979
62 63	10 11	"Rent a Family"	Roger Duchowny	Ben Joelson & Art Baer	November 10, 1979
62 63	10 11	"The Man in Her Life"	Roger Duchowny	Margie Peters	November 10, 1979
This takes place during a charity cruise involving The Dallas Cowboys Cheerleaders.: A bachelor executive hires actors to pose as his family to impress his boss and wife who don't know of his status. He however falls for one of the cheerleaders.; A beautiful movie star is on board to be the chairperson for the ship's charity cruise. However, once on board, she runs into the dean of American film and drama critics who have never given Miss Logan a good review. Once the two get together it's a contest of digs, and a surprise happening between the two.; One of the cheerleaders gets her friends to spend time with a persistent suitor to get him out of her hair. However, when one of them begins spending too much time with him, she starts to re-evaluate her relationship.; A man and a woman search for a supposedly hidden treasure on board.; Guest stars: Bill Daily, Douglas Fairbanks, Jr., Jackie Earle Haley, John Hillerman, Gunilla Hutton, Patsy Kelly, Roz Kelly, Larry Linville, Dina Merrill, Ginger Rogers, Natalie Schäfer, Stephen Shortridge, William Windom
64	12	"The Brotherhood of the Sea"	George Tyne	Jay Grossman	November 17, 1979
64	12	"Letter to Babycakes"	George Tyne	Howard Merrill	November 17, 1979
64	12	"Daddy's Pride"	George Tyne	Lee Aronsohn	November 17, 1979
To keep Julie from finding out about her surprise birthday party, Gopher, Isaac, and Doc invent a phony fraternity to keep her busy and devise frat-like procedures for her to join. This interferes with her romance with a passenger (Christopher Connelly). A womanizer (Demond Wilson) has his friend (Jimmie Walker) take responsibility when his girlfriend (Telma Hopkins) finds a letter from another woman in his jacket. A young gymnast's (Nancy McKeon) whole cruise is taken up by her father-coach (Alex Cord). Other guest stars: Sydney Goldsmith, Stephen Manley and Sid Gould as Sidney The Waiter.
65	13	"Not Now, I'm Dying"	Alan Rafkin	Haskell Barkin	November 24, 1979
65	13	"Too Young to Love"	Roger Duchowny	Story by : Lee Aronsohn; Teleplay by : Gordon Farr	November 24, 1979
65	13	"Eleanor's Return"	Alan Rafkin	Ray Jessel	November 24, 1979
A woman whom Stubing likes (Barbara Rush) comes on board but before he could make a move she hooks up with another man (Jon Cypher). A friend of Doc's (Barbi Benton) comes on board with her boyfriend (Dack Rambo). Now she wants a commitment but the guy keeps on making excuses to the point of faking an illness. Doc tries to help her by calling his bluff but discovers he truly is sick. And an underage couple (Timothy Patrick Murphy and Cristen Kauffman) comes on board to lose their virginity together. The girl's father (Frank Aletter) who's an exec of the line tells Stubing to make sure nothing happens between them. And Stubing lays that task on Gopher. Also guest starring Sid Gould.
66	14	"The Stimulation of Stephanie"	Allen Baron	Ben Joelson and Art Baer	December 1, 1979
66	14	"Life Begins at 40"	Allen Baron	Lee Aronsohn	December 1, 1979
66	14	"The Next Step"	Allen Baron	Story by : Bob Fraser & Rob Dames and Gordon Farr; Teleplay by : Gordon Farr	December 1, 1979
A lady about to turn 40 (Jo Anne Worley) has planned her upcoming wedding down to every detail except one – the groom. She hopes to find one on the cruise. A semi-retired NFL star (Rosey Grier) is trying to contemplate his post-NFL future with his wife (Melba Moore). A college professor (Dick Martin) trying to evaluate sexual stimulation with his student (Char Fontane) does not see that he is the one stimulating her. In the meantime, Doc romances a passenger (Judy Landers).
67	15	"The Harder They Fall"	Richard Kinon	Carmen Finestra	December 8, 1979
67	15	"The Spider Serenade"	Richard Kinon	Fred Grandy	December 8, 1979
67	15	"Next Door Wife"	Richard Kinon	Tony Webster	December 8, 1979
Gopher falls for a married, but separated, lady (Jill St. John). A man (James MacArthur) traveling with his fiancée (Susan Buckner) finds his ex-wife (Joanna Pettet) in the cabin next door. Two cruise line execs (Milton Berle, Alan Hale Jr.) were former middleweights who knocked out the referee. They decide to settle things once and for all, to the disgust of their wives (Nancy Kulp, Sheila MacRae). Unfortunately, history repeats itself as they succeed in knocking out Stubing. Also starring Robert Sampson.
68	16	"Making the Grade"	Gordon Farr	Ben Joelson and Art Baer	December 15, 1979
68	16	"The Gift"	Gordon Farr	Don Segall	December 15, 1979
68	16	"Doc's 'Ex' Change"	Gordon Farr	Marc Sheffler	December 15, 1979
A 12-year-old resents the romance between his mother (Jessica Walter) and his teacher (Richard Gautier); a financially troubled man (Sonny Bono) finds $2,000 in a borrowed coat; Doc and his ex-wife (Juliet Prowse) realize they're still married. Other guest stars: Kaye Ballard, Ronee Blakley, Red Buttons, Johnny Timko
69	17	"April's Love"	George Tyne	Tony Webster	January 12, 1980
69	17	"We Three"	George Tyne	Ben Joelson and Art Baer	January 12, 1980
69	17	"Happy Ending"	George Tyne	Tony Webster	January 12, 1980
The crew are quite suspicious of April's (Charo) manager-fiancé (Forrest Tucker). A divorcing script-writing couple (Don Adams and Juliet Mills) are trying to finish their script but the man is having second thoughts about the divorce. A woman (Marjorie Lord) and her adopted daughter (Laurie Walters) find themselves on the cruise with the daughter's birth father (Ross Martin) but the girl was told both her birth parents were deceased.
70 71	18 19	"Kinfolk"	Roger Duchowny	Lee Aronsohn	January 19, 1980
70 71	18 19	"Sis and the Slicker"	Roger Duchowny	Lee Aronsohn	January 19, 1980
70 71	18 19	"Moonlight and Moonshine"	Roger Duchowny	Lee Aronsohn	January 19, 1980
70 71	18 19	"Too Close for Comfort"	Roger Duchowny	Lee Aronsohn	January 19, 1980
70 71	18 19	"The Affair"	Roger Duchowny	Lan O'Kun	January 19, 1980
A singer (Donny Osmond) is ashamed of his family, who arouses the curiosity of a novelist; two passengers (Robert Guillaume, Pam Grier) cheat on their mates; Captain Stubing invites the crew into his suite when their quarters are flooded. Other guest stars: Loni Anderson, Eve Arden, Randall Carver, Rich Little, Denise Nicholas, Slim Pickens, Richard Paul, Marion Ross and Richard Roundtree. Note: Pam Grier is listed as "Pamala Grier" in the opening credits.
72	20	"Rent a Romeo"	Roger Duchowny	R.S. Allen	January 26, 1980
72	20	"Matchmaker, Matchmaker"	Roger Duchowny	Anitra Earle	January 26, 1980
72	20	"Y' Gotta Have Heart"	Roger Duchowny	R.S. Allen	January 26, 1980
Doc's attempts to spend time alone with his lady (Misty Rowe) are impeded by her emotionally unstable sister (Vicki Lawrence) so he gets a playboy friend (Joe Namath) to romance her. Vicki supports a boy (Mark James) who is trying to reunite his divorced parents (Ja'net DuBois, Cleavon Little); a woman (Brett Somers) prescribes a slow pace for her husband (Phil Harris), who is recovering from surgery.
73	21	"The Remake"	Richard Kinon	Lee Aronsohn	February 2, 1980
73	21	"The Perfect Match"	Richard Kinon	Eric Gethers	February 2, 1980
73	21	"The Captain's Ne'er Do Well Brother"	Richard Kinon	Casey Keller and Richard Albrecht	February 2, 1980
The Captain is not very thrilled to have his black-sheep brother Marshall (O.D. Warbux) on the cruise, especially when he romances a wealthy oil magnate (Diane Ladd). A woman (Connie Stevens) follows a handsome man (Kent McCord) on board because she is convinced he is the perfect man to father her baby. Julie's widowed aunt (Florence Henderson) becomes convinced she sees her late husband's double (James Broderick).
74	22	"Not So Fast, Gopher"	Gordon Farr	Gordon Farr	February 9, 1980
74	22	"Haven't We Met Before?"	Gordon Farr	Fred S. Fox and Seaman Jacobs	February 9, 1980
74	22	"Seoul Mates (aka Foreign Exchange)"	Gordon Farr	Story by : Tony Webster and Lee Aronsohn; Teleplay by : Tony Webster	February 9, 1980
Gopher's widowed mother (Ethel Merman) tries to hide her grief from her son; a comic (Johnny Yune) falls for a reporter (Momo Yashima) doing a story on him; a waiter (Nicholas Hammond) pretends to be a banker to win over a jet-setter (Hayley Mills). Also guest starring The Hudson Brothers: Bill Hudson, Brett Hudson, and Mark Hudson, Gene Rayburn
75	23	"Another Time, Another Place"	Allen Baron	Henry Colman	March 1, 1980
75	23	"Doctor Who"	Allen Baron	Evelyn Marienberg	March 1, 1980
75	23	"Gopher's Engagement"	Allen Baron	Harvey Bullock	March 1, 1980
A mother (Audrey Meadows) thinks Gopher would make a good suitor for her daughter (Maureen McCormick); a woman (Phyllis Davis) mistakes a professor (Arte Johnson) for a sex expert (Bert Parks); a journalist (Dennis Morgan) does not know his high-school friend (Jane Wyman) is a nun.
76	24	"Hey, Jealous Lover"	Roger Duchowny	Ray Jessel	March 15, 1980
76	24	"Tres Amigos"	Roger Duchowny	Tony Webster	March 15, 1980
76	24	"Dumb Luck"	Roger Duchowny	Ben Joelson and Art Baer	March 15, 1980
Julie helps a brilliant, but plain-looking woman become a glamour queen. Vicki and a young passenger try to help out a stowaway and a very jealous man accuses crew members of making passes at his wife. Guest stars: Shelley Hack, Kevin Tighe, Ronnie Scribner, Tony Ramirez, Jennifer Darling, John Gabriel, James Gregory, Jayne Meadows
77	25	"Celebration"	Richard Kinon	Harvey Bullock	March 29, 1980
77	25	"Captain Papa"	Richard Kinon	Story by : Lee Aronsohn; Teleplay by : Ruth Brooks Flippen	March 29, 1980
77	25	"Honeymoon Pressure"	Richard Kinon	Sylvia Hecht	March 29, 1980
The crew tries to impress a social worker (Lois Nettleton) aboard to determine if Stubing is a good parent; a mobster leader's (Frank Campanella) daughter and her husband (Eve Plumb, Sal Viscuso) honeymoon in the shadow of two bodyguards (Norman Alden, Richard Bakalyan); Isaac suspects a free-spending bank guard (Noah Beery Jr.) who is traveling with his wife (Alice Faye). Note: Richard Bakalyan is credited as Dick Bakalyan. Also guest starring Alice Nunn.
78	26	"Vicki's First Love"	George Tyne	Lou Patrick	April 5, 1980
78	26	"The High Cost of Loving"	George Tyne	R.S. Allen	April 5, 1980
78	26	"Accident Prone"	George Tyne	Jill Baer and Rick Shaw	April 5, 1980
An accident victim (Alan Feinstein) and the woman (Britt Ekland) who caused it keep their distance; Vicki tries to look shapely to catch a singer's (Rex Smith) eye; a palimony victim (Steve Kanaly) wants to avoid new relationships. Other guest stars: Catherine Campbell, Robin Eisenman, Shauna Sullivan
79	27	"The Invisible Maniac"	George Tyne	Harvey Bullock	April 19, 1980
79	27	"September Song"	George Tyne	R.S. Allen	April 19, 1980
79	27	"Peekaboo"	George Tyne	Harvey Bullock	April 19, 1980
A model (BernNadette Stanis) uses Isaac to make her husband (Clifton Davis) jealous; a lawyer (David Hasselhoff) wants to marry a colleague (Shelley Fabares) who is afraid to commit due to the ten-year difference in their ages; a woman (Peggy Cass) thinks a carefree attitude will save her marriage from boredom. Other guest stars: Gordon Jump, Jane Withers and Ann B. Davis
80	28	"No Girls for Doc"	Unknown	Unknown	May 3, 1980
80	28	"Marriage of Convenience"	Unknown	Unknown	May 3, 1980
80	28	"The Caller"	Unknown	Unknown	May 3, 1980
80	28	"The Witness"	Unknown	Unknown	May 3, 1980
A widow must make a serious decision about her friend, a woman being bothered by a mystery caller. The male members of the crew are shocked when Doc swears off women, so challenge him to a bet. A man who has had a gorgeous young woman in protective custody falls for her. Note: This is a 90-minute episode. Guest stars: James MacArthur, Mildred Natwick, Helen Hayes, Maurice Evans, John McCook, Christopher Norris, Larry Wilcox, Catherine Bach, Martin Short

=== Season 4 (1980–81) ===
No. overall	No. in season	Title	Directed by	Written by	Original release date
81	1	"Sergeant Bull"	Roger Duchowny	Carmen Finestra	October 25, 1980
81	1	"Friends and Lovers"	Roger Duchowny	Steve Hattman & Dave Hackel	October 25, 1980
81	1	"Miss Mother"	Roger Duchowny	Ann Gibbs & Joel Kimmel	October 25, 1980
A young woman (Shelley Smith) falls for a nice man (Dennis Cole) but is afraid to tell him she is pregnant. Three army buddies (Nipsey Russell, Harvey Lembeck and Jack Somack) come to regret reuniting with their old sergeant (Vic Tayback) when he begins running the reunion like a boot camp, so they fix him up with a housekeeper (Doris Roberts). Gopher gets Julie to pose as his girlfriend to impress his old college fraternity friend (Tom Hanks), but complications develop between the two co-workers.
82 83	2 3	"The Family Plan"	Roger Duchowny	Fred S. Fox & Seaman Jacobs	November 1, 1980
82 83	2 3	"The Promoter"	Roger Duchowny	Ben Joelson & Art Baer	November 1, 1980
82 83	2 3	"May the Best Man Win"	Roger Duchowny	Ben Joelson & Art Baer	November 1, 1980
82 83	2 3	"Forever Engaged"	Roger Duchowny	Tony Webster	November 1, 1980
82 83	2 3	"The Judges"	Roger Duchowny	Tony Webster	November 1, 1980
This trip revolves around a "Marriage-a-Thon" special of 50 couples set to make their vows. The cruise begins in the US Virgin Islands and ends in Los Angeles. Sights include Curaçao and the Panama Canal. The promoter of the marriage cruise is trying to reconcile with his wife, but when he makes a crooked deal with one of the couples, he is in danger of losing his wife to Captain Stubing. Doc tricks Gopher into being a contestant judge but then discovers the other two judges are attractive women who vie for Gopher's attention. Another couple has a reputation for being perpetually engaged. Julie's old friend Marv is supposed to be the best man in the mass wedding, but the groom runs off with an ex-girlfriend. Marv has the burden of telling the bride about her groom, only to fall in love with her himself. A groom's father and bride's mother attempt to talk their children out of marrying, only to fall in love themselves. The pinnacle of the voyage is the beautiful mass wedding. Gopher finds himself in hot water in Curaçao when he runs a pharmaceutical errand for Doc, who sent him so he could be alone with the attractive female judges. Gopher gets even in the closing scene. Guest stars: Darren McGavin, Debbie Reynolds, Peter Graves, Brian Kerwin, Erin Moran, Charlene Tilton, Donny Most, Rue McClanahan, Ted Knight, Ann Jillian, Dawn Wells, Kathie Browne
84	4	"The Major's Wife"	Roger Duchowny	Pat Fielder	November 8, 1980
84	4	"The Oilman Cometh"	Roger Duchowny	R.S. Allen & Harvey Bullock	November 8, 1980
84	4	"Target Gopher"	Roger Duchowny	Fred S. Fox & Seaman Jacobs	November 8, 1980
84	4	"Strange Honeymoon"	Roger Duchowny	R.S. Allen & Harvey Bullock	November 8, 1980
The Dallas Cowboys Cheerleaders come aboard. Gopher loses his job because the promoter becomes jealous when the cheerleader that he is interested in likes Gopher and not him. A Saudi oil sheik mistakes his gift from the promoter's assistant to be one of the cheerleaders. A man and his bride-to-be share the honeymoon with his best man. An Air Force officer and his Japanese-born wife find themselves confronted by his ex-girlfriend. Note: This is a 90-minute episode. Guest stars: David Cassidy, Al Corley, Robert Culp, Pat Harrington, Nobu McCarthy, Mark Pinter, Jo Ann Pflug.
85 86	5 6	"The Mallory Quest"	Richard Kinon	Stephen Kandel & Harvey Bullock	November 15, 1980
85 86	5 6	"Julie, the Vamp"	Richard Kinon	R.S. Allen & Harvey Bullock	November 15, 1980
85 86	5 6	"The Offer"	Richard Kinon	R.S. Allen	November 15, 1980
On a Caribbean cruise, famous author Mallory (Pernell Roberts) invites several people to help find his nephew with the promise of a huge reward. His aggravated wife (Gayle Hunnicutt) leaves him and finds comfort with Doc. One of the participants (Skip Stephenson) is about to donate a kidney to his brother but is being followed by his brother's fiancée (Maren Jensen). Another member (Jimmie Walker) is trying to find his dream girl on the cruise. The boyfriend (Peter Lupus) of another member of the quest (Connie Stevens) is suspicious of Mallory's motives. A jealous woman (Lani O'Grady) accuses Julie of trying to steal her fiancé (Bart Braverman), whom Julie had known in college. As the quest for Mallory's nephew (Gregg Robblee) continues, the people involved become suspicious and eventually make Mallory confess his real motives. A repentant Mallory tries to reconcile with his wife. A mysterious man (Sorrell Booke) begins following them. The kidney donor and the fiancėe become attracted to each other. Julie's friend and his girlfriend continue to drive her crazy. Other guest stars: Dick Van Patten, Walter Slezak, Patti Macleod, James Dobson.
87	7	"The Horse Lover"	Roger Duchowny	Unknown	November 22, 1980
87	7	"Secretary to the Stars"	Roger Duchowny	Unknown	November 22, 1980
87	7	"Julie's Decision"	Roger Duchowny	Unknown	November 22, 1980
87	7	"Gopher and Isaac Buy a Horse"	Roger Duchowny	Unknown	November 22, 1980
87	7	"Village People Ride Again"	Roger Duchowny	Unknown	November 22, 1980
In preparation for a steeplechase race in Mexico, one of the racers (Allen Ludden) spends more time with his horse than with his wife (Betty White), who finds comfort in the man's business partner (David Doyle). A Hollywood actress (Loni Anderson) disguises herself as her secretary to obtain privacy but ends up falling for a reporter (Charles Frank) sent to interview her. A wealthy racer (Robert Stack) falls for Julie and proposes to her. Gopher and Isaac stable a horse on board. The Village People (as themselves) also have a horse in the race. Note: This is a 90-minute episode.
88	8	"The Baby Alarm"	Ray Austin	Lan O'Kun	November 29, 1980
88	8	"Tell Her She's Great"	Ray Austin	Tony Webster	November 29, 1980
88	8	"Matchmaker, Matchmaker Times Two"	Ray Austin	Fred S. Fox and Seaman Jacobs	November 29, 1980
Isaac gets the crew to bolster his stagestruck aunt's (Isabel Sanford) ego, which turns her into an outrageous prima donna and upsets his uncle (Mel Stewart). Two sets of parents (Farley Granger, Joan Lorring, Terry Moore and Troy Donahue) go overboard trying to spark a romance between their respective children (Lorenzo Lamas and Melissa Sue Anderson). An unwed mother's (Susan Howard) infant son has an unusual way of showing his disapproval to men who try to romance her.
89	9	"She Stole His Heart"	Richard Kinon	Jack Turley	December 6, 1980
89	9	"Return of the Captain's Brother"	Richard Kinon	Richard Albrecht & Casey Keller	December 6, 1980
89	9	"Swag and Mag"	Richard Kinon	Howard Albrecht & Sol Weinstein	December 6, 1980
A kleptomaniac (Joan Van Ark) meets a psychiatrist (Stephen Keep Mills) who tries to help her but when they fall for each other, he keeps his distance. A television star (Ron Ely) whom Vicki adores comes on board with his girlfriend-agent (Erin Gray) but has to deal with an overbearing passenger (William Boyett). The Captain's brother comes on the cruise to introduce the woman he is going to marry (Arlene Dahl), but an ex (Zsa Zsa Gabor) follows, determined to win him back. Also guest starring Sonny Wilde as the Captain's youngest brother meaning MacLeod plays three characters in this one episode.
90	10	"Boomerang"	Richard Kinon	Lou Patrick	December 13, 1980
90	10	"Captain's Triangle"	Richard Kinon	Ken Hecht	December 13, 1980
90	10	"Out of This World"	Richard Kinon	Jill Baer and Christopher Vane	December 13, 1980
Gopher and a passenger (Tom Smothers) believe a librarian (Helen Reddy) is actually a space alien. A model (Pamela Sue Martin) pretending to be a married woman learns a lesson from two bachelors (Guich Koock and Barry Van Dyke). The Captain's ex-girlfriend (Sue Anne Langdon) tries to seduce him even though she is married to a former captain friend of his (Monte Markham).
91	11	"That's My Dad"	Allen Baron	Hudson Hickman & Alfred Monacella	December 20, 1980
91	11	"The Captain's Bird"	Allen Baron	Ben Joelson & Art Baer	December 20, 1980
91	11	"Captive Audience"	Allen Baron	Richard Albrecht & Casey Keller	December 20, 1980
The Captain gets Vicki a parrot for Christmas, but it hasn't been trained to talk, and Gopher's and Isaac's efforts to train it prove disastrous. A stowaway (Meeno Peluce) convinces the crew that a playboy passenger (Dirk Benedict) is his father but this story becomes considerably more serious as the episode progresses. An estranged father and son (Allan Jones and Jack Jones) resist their wives' (Dorothy Lamour & Laraine Stephens) efforts to reunite them. (Jack Jones is the singer of the Love Boat theme song). Other guest stars: Beth Scheffel and Robert Aguayo.
92	12	"Doc's Dismissal"	Richard Kinon	Tony Webster & Richard Albrecht & Casey Keller	January 3, 1981
92	12	"The Frugal Pair"	Richard Kinon	Fredi Towbin	January 3, 1981
92	12	"The Girl Next Door"	Richard Kinon	Christopher Vane & Jill Baer	January 3, 1981
A couple celebrating their 40th anniversary see their marriage in risk of ending when the wife makes a revelation about their financial affairs. A woman fed up with her husband's constant ogling of other women attempts to use Doc to make him jealous and could cost him his career. A man suspecting his girlfriend of cheating convinces the woman in the cabin next door that he is a CIA agent tracking down KGB operatives. Guest stars: Lew Ayres, Janet Gaynor, Alex Cord, Jessica Walter, Sal Viscuso, Lynda Goodfriend, Denise DuBarry, Stephen Shortridge, Bobby Justin (uncredited).
93	13	"Isaac's Secret"	Bob Sweeney	Lloyd J. Schwartz	January 10, 1981
93	13	"Seal of Approval"	Bob Sweeney	Madora McKenzie & Andy Ruben	January 10, 1981
93	13	"The Curse of the Dumbrowskis"	Bob Sweeney	Ray Allen & Harvey Bullock	January 10, 1981
Isaac is afraid to tell his former teacher (Lillian Gish) that he is just a bartender, so Gopher gets him to pose as the ship's first officer. Shirley the Seal goes overboard when she spots her trainer (Donald O'Connor) with another woman (Georgia Engel). A woman (Florence Henderson), convinced of her impending death, tries to find a new wife for her husband (Jeffrey Tambor). Other guest stars: Christina Hart and Reb Brown
94	14	"From Here to Maternity"	Howard Morris	Fred S. Fox and Seaman Jacobs	January 17, 1981
94	14	"Jealousy"	Howard Morris	Sid Morse	January 17, 1981
94	14	"The Trigamist"	Howard Morris	Tony Webster	January 17, 1981
A judge finds herself attracted to the man whom she had placed on probation for polygamy. Vicki is jealous when her father is attracted to a beautiful passenger. An expectant couple pesters Doc while he tries to court another passenger. Guest stars: Murphy Cross, Michael Young, Nancy Walker, George Gobel, Rebecca Holden, Pat Crowley.
95	15	"First Voyage, Last Voyage"	Roger Duchowny	Si Rose	January 17, 1981
95	15	"April the Ninny"	Roger Duchowny	Art Baer and Ben Joelson	January 17, 1981
95	15	"The Loan Arranger"	Roger Duchowny	Jay Grossman	January 17, 1981
April (Charo)'s becomes a nanny to the two children of a TV sportscaster. A loan shark sends a man to collect an outstanding debt from a passenger. A young woman traveling with her parents meets and falls in love with a man, but she does not know that she is dying from leukemia. Guest stars: Larry Linville, Charo, Rachel Jacobs, Alex Woodard, Kathleen Nolan, Maureen McCormick, Richard Kline, Lisa Hartman, Erik Stern, Jay Thomas, Dody Goodman, Ty Hardin.
96	16	"Gopher's Bride"	Richard Kinon	Len Janson and Chuck Menville	January 24, 1981
96	16	"Love with a Married Man"	Richard Kinon	Sid Morse	January 24, 1981
96	16	"Not Tonight, Jack!"	Richard Kinon	R.S. Allen and Harvey Bullock	January 24, 1981
Isaac and Doc compete for the affection of a girl (Marie Laurin) to whom they have been writing joke love letters under Gopher's name. A couple (Dana Wynter, Paul Burke) drift apart over work habits. The man whose wife is too busy for him finds another love (Susan Oliver). A man (Patrick Wayne) is displaced after his furious girlfriend (Trish Stewart) discovers they were to share quarters. Other guest stars: Pamela Jean Bryant and Paul Gale.
97	17	"Lose One, Win One"	Jack Arnold	Sid Morse	January 31, 1981
97	17	"The $10,000 Lover"	Jack Arnold	Jill Baer and Christopher Vane	January 31, 1981
97	17	"Mind My Wife"	Jack Arnold	Sid Morse	January 31, 1981
A woman (Dorian Lopinto) traveling with her fiancé (Sam Chew Jr.) meets a man (Steve Marachuk) who claims to have known her from high school. A man (Ron Palillo) is on the verge of setting a record for having intimate relations with the most women but finds true love with a fellow passenger (Gina Hecht), causing distress for the keeper of stats for the world-record book (James Darren). Doc must fend off the advances of the love-starved wife (Jill St. John) of his best friend from college (Jim McKrell).
98	18	"Aquaphobiac"	Roger Duchowny	R.S. Allen and Harvey Bullock	February 7, 1981
98	18	"Humpty Dumpty"	Roger Duchowny	Ruth Brooks Flippen	February 7, 1981
98	18	"The Starmaker"	Roger Duchowny	Ted Lange and Jean Ford	February 7, 1981
Isaac tries to impress a visiting concert promoter with his singing skills and convinces three maids (the Pointer Sisters) to act as his backup. A former football star has a romance with Julie. A man is forced by his wife to take a cruise to overcome his fear of water. Guest stars: Ruth, Anita, and June Pointer, Jason Hervey, Suzanne Kent, Louis Nye, Audra Lindley, David Hasselhoff, and Jeff Cooper (actor).
99	19	"Return of the Ninny"	Roger Duchowny	Art Baer and Ben Joelson	February 14, 1981
99	19	"Split Personality"	Roger Duchowny	Tony Webster	February 14, 1981
99	19	"Touchdown Twins"	Roger Duchowny	Lee Goldstein	February 14, 1981
April (Charo) and her charges accidentally find themselves on board while her employer and his new fiancée set sail. Gopher's college friend tries to please both his boss and the boss' daughter, not knowing they are father and daughter. A man falls for the mother of his old college friend. Other Guest stars: Michael Lembeck, Larry Linville, Samantha Eggar, Vincent Van Patten, Rachel Jacobs, Laurette Spang, Ralph Bellamy, Alex Woodard, Natasha Martell, Philip Brown.
100	20	"Quiet, My Wife's Listening"	Harry Mastrogeorge	Tony Webster	February 21, 1981
100	20	"Eye of the Beholder"	Harry Mastrogeorge	Sid Morse	February 21, 1981
100	20	"The Nudist from Sunshine Gardens"	Harry Mastrogeorge	Evelyn Marienberg	February 21, 1981
A self-pitying blind woman is romanced by a gentle farmer. A man traveling with his new girlfriend is convinced that his estranged wife has planted bugs in his cabin. Gopher's attempts to prohibit a woman from sunbathing nude are blocked by a lawyer who feels her rights are being denied. Guest stars: Leslie Uggams, David Hedison, Dick Martin, Barbi Benton, Peter Haskell, Mary Ann Mobley, Judith Chapman, Thelma Carpenter.
101	21	"Clothes Make the Girl"	Earl Bellamy	Lan O'Kun	February 28, 1981
101	21	"Black Sheep"	Earl Bellamy	Fred Grandy and Jan Gough Grandy	February 28, 1981
101	21	"Hometown Doc"	Earl Bellamy	Haskell Barkin	February 28, 1981
Isaac's shady uncle (Demond Wilson) is shadowed by a government agent (Robert Ginty). A crew member (Larry Breeding) pretends to be a rich passenger to please the mother (Lee Meriwether) of his love interest (Kyle Aletter). Doc's old friend (Randolph Powell) introduces Doc to his fiancée (Cindy Morgan) but tells him that he's not going to practice medicine in their hometown, so Doc decides to resign and fill the role himself. Other guest stars: Steve Doubet, Vernee Watson-Johnson and John Beradino
102	22	"Sally's Paradise"	Earl Bellamy	R.S. Allen and Harvey Bullock	March 7, 1981
102	22	"I Love You Too, Smith"	Earl Bellamy	Fred Grandy	March 7, 1981
102	22	"Mama and Me"	Earl Bellamy	R.S. Allen and Harvey Bullock	March 7, 1981
Gopher has a love-hate relationship with a customs official who is traveling with her boyfriend. A young man is reunited with an old girlfriend, but his mother has someone else in mind for him at home. The manager of the gift shop has her hands full with all three of her fiancés on board. Guest stars: Joanna Pettet, Christopher Pennock, Eddie Mekka, Joan Prather, Sylvia Sidney, Juliet Mills, Gary Conway, Pedro Armendariz Jr., Kenneth Kimmins.
103	23	"The Duel"	Ray Austin	Evelyn Marienberg	March 14, 1981
103	23	"Two for Julie"	Ray Austin	Barbara Allyn	March 14, 1981
103	23	"Aunt Hilly"	Ray Austin	Lou Patrick	March 14, 1981
Two toymaking engineers (Ken Kercheval and Dack Rambo) traveling with their boss (Don Ameche) vie for Julie's affections. Captain Stubing's aunt (Olivia de Havilland) and uncle (Joseph Cotten) visit to meet Vicki. Doc is challenged to a duel by a man (Alejandro Rey) whose girlfriend (Linda Cristal) is sweet on Doc.
104	24	"That Old Gang of Mine"	Richard Kinon	R.S. Allen and Harvey Bullock	April 11, 1981
104	24	"Love with a Skinny Stranger"	Richard Kinon	R.S. Allen and Harvey Bullock	April 11, 1981
104	24	"Vicki and the Gambler"	Richard Kinon	Sid Morse	April 11, 1981
A woman dating a man who was once obese now has to deal with a romantic rival. A professional gambler makes friends with Vicki. A group of aging crooks meets to plan one last heist (Jack Gilford played a similar character in the 1967 film Who's Minding the Mint?, for which R.S. Allen and Harvey Bullock also wrote). Guest stars: Kaye Ballard, Gene Barry, Jack Gilford, Vicki Lawrence, Charles Siebert, Jesse White, Cindee Appleton.
105 106	25 26	"This Year's Model"	Roger Duchowny	Richard Albrecht and Casey Keller	May 2, 1981
105 106	25 26	"The Model Marriage"	Roger Duchowny	Tony Webster	May 2, 1981
105 106	25 26	"Vogue Rogue"	Roger Duchowny	Barry Blitzer	May 2, 1981
105 106	25 26	"Too Clothes for Comfort"	Roger Duchowny	Richard Albrecht and Casey Keller	May 2, 1981
105 106	25 26	"Original Sin"	Roger Duchowny	Barry Blitzer	May 2, 1981
On a special cruise to Acapulco for a fashion festival, designers Geoffrey Beene, Halston, Bob Mackie, and Gloria Vanderbilt play themselves. A husband and wife who own a model agency spar over the use of one of the models who has captured the Captain's eye. A cosmetics king searching for a unique woman to represent his new product finds two competing candidates. Julie stands in for a model friend who has fallen in love. A couple searches for missing designer clothes while trying to keep their marriage secret from the woman's father. Other guest stars: Robert Vaughn, Anne Baxter, Mike Connors, McLean Stevenson, Debra Clinger, Elke Sommer, Morgan Brittany, Jayne Kennedy, Cristina Ferrare, Dick Shawn, Bobby Short, Richard Gilliland, Camilla Sparv.
107	27	"Maid for Each Other"	Howard Morris	Tony Webster	May 9, 1981
107	27	"Lost and Found"	Howard Morris	Henry Colman	May 9, 1981
107	27	"Then There Were Two"	Howard Morris	Tony Webster	May 9, 1981
Gopher's aunt (Jane Powell), afraid to tell him she is no longer wealthy and has to work as a maid for another passenger (Mary Wickes), meets a charming passenger (Howard Keel). A playboy (Joe Namath) schemes against his best friend (Fred Willard) to claim a cash windfall. An abandoned infant needs an emergency blood transfusion. Other guest stars: Gary Burghoff, Karen Grassle, Belinda J. Montgomery.
108	28	"Tony and Julie"	Richard Kinon	Ben Joelson and Art Baer	May 16, 1981
108	28	"Separate Beds"	Richard Kinon	Si Rose	May 16, 1981
108	28	"America's Sweetheart"	Richard Kinon	Richard Albrecht and Casey Keller	May 16, 1981
Julie butts heads with a male passenger (Anthony Andrews). A young actress comes on board and makes a fool of Vicki. An estranged husband and wife end up in the same cabin. Guest stars: Anthony Andrews, Alison Arngrim, William Christopher, Nancy Kulp, Ronnie Schell, Toni Tennille, Lindsay Bloom.

=== Season 5 (1981–82) ===
No. overall	No. in season	Title	Directed by	Written by	Original release date
109 110	1 2	"The Expedition"	Roger Duchowny	Ben Joelson & Art Baer and Jill Baer & Christopher Vane	October 10, 1981
109 110	1 2	"Julie's Wedding"	Roger Duchowny	Ben Joelson & Art Baer and Tony Webster	October 10, 1981
109 110	1 2	"The Mongala"	Roger Duchowny	Ben Joelson & Art Baer and Jill Baer & Christopher Vane	October 10, 1981
109 110	1 2	"Julie's Replacement"	Roger Duchowny	Richard Albrecht & Casey Keller and Ben Joelson & Art Baer	October 10, 1981
109 110	1 2	"The Three R's"	Roger Duchowny	Donald Ross	October 10, 1981
109 110	1 2	"The Professor's Wife"	Roger Duchowny	Ben Joelson & Art Baer and Jill Baer & Christopher Vane	October 10, 1981
Julie prepares to marry her fiancé during a stopover in Sydney, with Vicki as a bridesmaid, Capt. Stubing set to give her away and the guys as ushers; an anthropologist gives a golden opportunity to a disgraced former colleague but neglects his wife; a rancher holds a secret from a fellow passenger while catching the eye of a pretty girl; Gopher and Doc vie for the affections of the new cruise director. Isaac finds a problem with the crew's wedding gift for Julie; a love triangle pits two women against each other over an eligible rancher; the Mongala, an evolutionary missing link discovered by two anthropologists, is caged in the bowels of the ship; the crew tours the Australian animal preserve where Julie's fiancé works. Guest stars: Anthony Andrews, Patrick Duffy, Michelle Phillips, Delvene Delaney, Donna Dixon, Elizabeth the Koala, José Ferrer, Harry Morgan, Gary Frank, Jenilee Harrison, Katherine Helmond, Tiny the Kangaroo, Queenie Ashton, Patrick Ward, Brendan Lunney.
111	3	"Two Grapes on the Vine"	Bob Sweeney	Jesse Dizon & Don Haberman	October 17, 1981
111	3	"Aunt Sylvia"	Bob Sweeney	Tony Webster	October 17, 1981
111	3	"Deductible Divorce"	Bob Sweeney	Richard Albrecht & Casey Keller	October 17, 1981
In the Virgin Islands, a wine-tasting competition is held, and Julie's aunt helps her friend scheme to snag the contest's wealthy sponsor; a judge starts a shipboard fling without getting to know his new partner well; a married couple who gets divorced every year for tax purposes takes the cruise; Vicki pines over a pro football player. Note: This is a 90-minute episode. Guest stars: Lee Bergere as Vince Van Durling, Carol Channing as Aunt Sylvia Duvall, Douglas Fairbanks, Jr. as Elliott Banning, Michael Goodwin as Kevin Butler, Robert Guillaume as Allan Curtis, Tanya Tucker as Annie Butler, Leslie Uggams as Marion Blake, Robert Walden as Jeff Thatcher, Betty White as Betsy Boucher, and Pat Haden as himself (Los Angeles Rams quarterback).
112	4	"The Incredible Hunk"	Howard Morris	Ray Jessel	October 24, 1981
112	4	"Isaac, the Marriage Counselor"	Howard Morris	Tony Webster	October 24, 1981
112	4	"Jewels & Jim"	Howard Morris	Haskell Barkin	October 24, 1981
A teacher tries to hide his side job as a male stripper from a PTA member; Isaac's advice leads a husband astray, and his attempts to fix the problem only make matters worse; the captain suspects a known burglar in a theft of expensive jewels. Guest stars: Henny Backus as Mrs. Landers, Jim Backus as Mr. Landers, Marla Gibbs as Janet Dalton, Brian Kerwin as Hank Austin, Christopher Norris as Shelley, Joan Van Ark as Lila Chandler, Flip Wilson as Frank Dalton, and Michael Zaslow as Jim Pickett.
113	5	"Country Blues"	Don Weis	R.S. Allen & Harvey Bullock	October 31, 1981
113	5	"Daddy's Little Girl"	Don Weis	Joan Brooker & Alexandra Stoddart	October 31, 1981
113	5	"Jackpot"	Don Weis	.S. Allen & Harvey Bullock	October 31, 1981
Gopher finds some money and fantasizes how he'll spend it; a folk singer meets an old friend who's now a politician and traveling with a female companion; a woman traveling with her father meets a veterinarian. Guest Stars: Mason Adams as Richard Simmons, Frank Bonner as Dr. Jonathan Hunt, Florence Henderson as Annabelle Folker, Carol Lawrence as Barbara Gosford, James Noble as Martin "Blinky" Corell, and Randi Oakes as Marcy Crane.
114	6	"Chef's Special"	Richard Kinon	Henry Colman	November 7, 1981
114	6	"Beginning Anew"	Richard Kinon	Len Janson	November 7, 1981
114	6	"Kleinschmidt"	Richard Kinon	R.S. Allen & Harvey Bullock	November 7, 1981
A new female cook lends a hand to the busy chef, who is not too happy with the arrangement; a bumbling German detective (Bernie Kopell) watches a lady's jewels; an embittered old sea dog meets a former girlfriend. Guest Stars: Leslie Easterbrook as Edie Franklin, Jay Johnson as Chef Claude, Trisha Noble as Gertrude Turner, Richard Basehart as Stan Ellis, and Joan Fontaine as Jennifer Langley.
115	7	"The Lady from Laramie"	Jack Arnold	Fred S. Fox & Seaman Jacobs	November 14, 1981
115	7	"Vicki Swings"	Jack Arnold	Lou Patrick	November 14, 1981
115	7	"Phantom Bride"	Jack Arnold	Paul Haggis & Michael Maurer	November 14, 1981
A male escort traveling with a companion meets a widow from Wyoming; a married couple checks into the honeymoon suite to find the "Phantom Bride"; Vicki pretends to be older to attract an 18-year-old boy away from another girl. Guest Stars: Cesare Danova as Fedalio Cevini, Nancy Dussault as Libby Crawford, Buddy Hackett as Julian Garfield, Patrick Labyorteaux as Todd Andrews, Irlene Mandrell as Andrea, Juliet Mills as Kate Garfield, and Marti Stevens as Miss Singleton.
116 117	8 9	"Farnsworth's Fling"	Richard Kinon	Fred S. Fox & Seaman Jacobs	November 21, 1981
116 117	8 9	"Gopher Farnsworth Smith"	Richard Kinon	Fred S. Fox & Seaman Jacobs	November 21, 1981
116 117	8 9	"Three in a Bed"	Richard Kinon	Fred S. Fox & Seaman Jacobs	November 21, 1981
116 117	8 9	"Merrill, Melanie & Melanesia"	Richard Kinon	Ray Jessel	November 21, 1981
116 117	8 9	"I Remember Helen"	Richard Kinon	Ben Joelson & Art Baer	November 21, 1981
A dying tycoon (Lloyd Bridges) charters the ship to re-evaluate his relatives. The crew is in Australia to work on one of the cruise line's ships based there. A wealthy man named William Farnsworth (Lloyd Bridges) has decided to invite his whole family for a reunion. However, he wants to see who among them he should keep in his will. Among them is his niece, Marcia (Jessica Walter), who is not exactly fond of him, because she believes that because of him her father became penniless. She brings along a friend, Jessica (Linda Evans), who has a knack for getting wealthy men to marry her to get him to marry her so that she could get what Marcia thinks she deserves. He asks his niece, Jenny (Morgan Fairchild) and her husband Bud (Grant Goodeve), to come but they are divorced so they have to pretend that they are still married. After her fiancé (Alan Fletcher) calls, he comes aboard and refuses to leave and when he is told there are no more cabins, he stays with them. Farnsworth's secretary and niece, Eloise (Beth Howland) gets him a replacement valet, Wayne (Jim Nabors) who's not exactly what he is used to. Wayne and Eloise get close. Gopher thinks he might be related to Farnsworth and could be entitled to his fortune. Stubing meets an old flame's daughter, Melanie (Margaret Laurence) and when he has to go, she decides to join him and he keeps his distance because he cannot seem to separate her from her late mother. Julie cannot help but think about Tony Selkirk (Anthony Andrews), the guy she nearly married but he chose not to get married because he was dying. Guest Stars: Lloyd Bridges as William Otis Farnsworth, Jessica Walter as Marcia Farnsworth-Smith, Linda Evans as Jessica Halberson, Morgan Fairchild as Jenny Boyer, Grant Goodeve as Bud Boyer, Anthony Andrews as Tony Selkirk (archive footage), Beth Howland as Eloise Farnsworth, Jim Nabors as Wayne Bouton (the Valet), Elizabeth the Koala as herself, Graham Kennedy as Port Vila Jeweller, Margaret Laurence as Melanie Kalani, Madeline Kalani (flashback), Patti MacLeod as Hazel Farnsworth, and Ethel Merman as Roz Smith (Gopher's mother). Other Guests: Alan Fletcher as Martin Blake, Brendan Lunney as David Selkirk, and Russell Newman as Frank Farnsworth.
118	10	"Radioactive Isaac"	Robert Scheerer	Everett Greenbaum and Elliott Reid	November 28, 1981
118	10	"Gladys and Agnes"	Robert Scheerer	Sid Morse	November 28, 1981
118	10	"Love, Honor, and Obey"	Robert Scheerer	Arnold Kane	November 28, 1981
After 20 years of marriage, a couple of bickers over renewing wedding vows; a reluctant old maid is tricked into romance by her sister; Isaac's dental work has strange side effects. Guest stars: Bernard Fox as Henry Whitewood, Darrow Igus as Brandon Ames, Audra Lindley as Agnes Larrabee, Anne Meara as Rose Vitelli, Marion Ross as Gladys Johnson, Jerry Stiller as Tony Vitelli, Berlinda Tolbert as Patty Phelps, Fred Holliday as Father Brendan Riley.
119	11	"He's My Brother"	Bruce Bilson	Tony Webster	December 5, 1981
119	11	"Zeke and Zelda"	Bruce Bilson	Christopher Vane & Jill Baer	December 5, 1981
119	11	"Teach Me Tonight"	Bruce Bilson	Jerry Winnick	December 5, 1981
A man seeks revenge on his brother, "Dr. Adam Bricker"; an elderly couple evicted from their home tries to scam a free cruise; a plain woman meets the suave author of the trashy romance novel she is reading (called Passion at Dawn). Guest stars: Daryl Anderson as Michael Scott, Jack Bannon as Fred Bricker, Milton Berle as Zeke "Van Buren," Elinor Donahue as Mrs. Van Buren, Herb Edelman as Howard Van Buren, Elaine Joyce as Nancy Bricker, Martha Raye as Zelda "Van Buren", Susan Richardson as Emily Parker.
120	12	"Take a Letter, Vicki"	Richard Kinon	Roy Battocchio	December 12, 1981
120	12	"The Floating Bridge Game"	Richard Kinon	Marlene Perry & Mel Shields	December 12, 1981
120	12	"The Joy of Celibacy"	Richard Kinon	Howard Albrecht & Sol Weinstein	December 12, 1981
Vicki's overzealous approach to her new duties annoys the crew; a group of bridge players schemes to get a former member back; a casanova plays hard-to-get-to-defrost a frigid female. Guest stars: Robert Alda as Dr. Frank Leonhardt, Lucille Benson as Doris, Jan Clayton as Ethel, Nanette Fabray as Shirley Simpson, Rose Marie as fourth bridge player, Jim Stafford as Barry Styles, and Carlene Watkins as Linda Trent.
121	13	"Doc Takes the Fifth"	Bruce Bilson	Tony Webster and Jill Baer & Christopher Vane	January 2, 1982
121	13	"Safety Last"	Bruce Bilson	Joel S. Hecht & Joseph Neustein	January 2, 1982
121	13	"A Business Affair"	Bruce Bilson	Haskell Barkin	January 2, 1982
Doc weds a concert cellist but finds she didn't marry him for love; an overly cautious safety inspector learns it may be too risky to play it safe; a high-strung executive falls for his female vice president. Guest stars: Don Adams as Sidney Williams, Britt Ekland as Alice Robbins, Irena Ferris as Tania Bricker, Robert Fuller as Ralph Kirby, Judy Norton-Taylor as Lydia Foster, and Kai Wulff as Mikhail.
122	14	"Good Neighbors"	Jerome Courtland	Tony Webster	January 9, 1982
122	14	"Familiar Faces"	Jerome Courtland	Howard Albrecht & Sol Weinstein	January 9, 1982
122	14	"Captain's Portrait"	Jerome Courtland	John Whelpley	January 9, 1982
A persistent passenger tries to win over a reluctant neighbor; the captain frets over the painting of his portrait; an aspiring lawyer fears being recognized by a figure from his wild days. Guest stars: Dean Butler, Arlene Golonka, Henry Jones, Mary Elizabeth McDonough, Lee Meriwether, Sonny Shroyer.
123	15	"I Don't Play Anymore"	Bob Sweeney	Lan O'Kun	January 23, 1982
123	15	"Gopher's Roommate"	Bob Sweeney	Ben Joelson & Art Baer	January 23, 1982
123	15	"Crazy for You"	Bob Sweeney	Christopher Vane & Jill Baer	January 23, 1982
A famed pianist fights through pain to finance a maid's operation; Gopher must deal with an old buddy who is now a woman; a psychologist suspects a claimant of faking his quirky disability. Guest stars: Joanna Cassidy, James MacArthur, Pat McCormick, Donna Pescow, Mackenzie Phillips, Dick Shawn.
124	16	"Green, But Not Jolly"	Richard Kinon	Tony Webster	January 30, 1982
124	16	"Past Perfect Love"	Richard Kinon	Haskell Barkin	January 30, 1982
124	16	"Instant Family"	Richard Kinon	Donald Ross	January 30, 1982
Julie's hair turns green; two people are brought together by visions of reincarnation; a single mother's devotion to her special-needs son threatens a budding romance. Guest stars: Bert Convy, Lynda Day George, John Phillip Law, Tanya Roberts, Corey Feldman.
125	17	"The Return of the Captain's Lady"	Howard Morris	Sid Morse	February 6, 1982
125	17	"Love Ain't Illegal"	Howard Morris	Jack and Carole Mendelsohn	February 6, 1982
125	17	"The Irresistible Man"	Howard Morris	R.S. Allen & Harvey Bullock	February 6, 1982
The captain commemorates his tenth year with the cruise line and proposes to an old flame; business associates double-cross each other in various ways; the appeal of a rebuked suitor soars when scintillating rumors circulate. Guest stars: Linwood Boomer, Lydia Cornell, Pat Crowley, Phyllis Davis, Patricia Klous, Robert Mandan, Dick Martin.
126	18	"His Girls Friday"	Robert Scheerer	Marlene Perry & Mel Shields	February 13, 1982
126	18	"A Wife for Wilfred"	Robert Scheerer	Fred S. Fox & Seaman Jacobs	February 13, 1982
126	18	"The Girl Who Stood Still"	Robert Scheerer	Rick Lenz	February 13, 1982
A businessman takes his prudish secretary on a business trip, then he meets an attractive blonde and has difficulty firing the former to hire the latter; another man offers the crew $10,000 if they can find him a pretty wife and several women vie for his attention, while the crew tries to win the money; a mother tries to reunite her teenage daughter with a childhood sweetheart, only the girl is self-conscious about developing scoliosis. Guest stars: Judy Landers, Rue McClanahan, Vera Miles, Denise Miller, Jimmy Osmond, Tom Smothers, Connie Stevens, Dick Van Patten.
127	19	"Live It Up"	Richard Kinon	Howard Albrecht and Sol Weinstein	February 20, 1982
127	19	"New York A.C."	Richard Kinon	Mike Marmer	February 20, 1982
127	19	"All's Affair in Love and War"	Richard Kinon	Lan O'Kun	February 20, 1982
Three divorced men try to prevent each other from marrying, but one of them rekindles a romance with his ex-wife; a woman pleads with her lover to leave his wife; Captain Stubing experiences dizzy spells. Guest stars: Edd Byrnes, Ron Ely, Fabian, Annette Funicello, Jill St. John, Bobby Sherman.
128 129	20 21	"The Musical"	Roger Duchowny	Ray Jessel	February 27, 1982
128 129	20 21	"My Aunt, the Worrier"	Roger Duchowny	Tony Webster	February 27, 1982
128 129	20 21	"The Show Must Go On"	Roger Duchowny	Ray Jessel	February 27, 1982
128 129	20 21	"The Pest"	Roger Duchowny	Ben Joelson and Art Baer	February 27, 1982
128 129	20 21	"My Ex-Mom"	Roger Duchowny	Ray Jessel	February 27, 1982
The crew and guests stage musical numbers. Guest stars: Cab Calloway, Carol Channing, Van Johnson, Ethel Merman, Ann Miller, Della Reese.
130 131	22 23	"Klondike Carnival"	Roger Duchowny	Fred Grandy and Jan Gough Grandy	March 6, 1982
130 131	22 23	"The Viking's Son"	Roger Duchowny	Fred Grandy and Jan Gough Grandy	March 6, 1982
130 131	22 23	"Separate Vacations"	Roger Duchowny	Fred Grandy and Jan Gough Grandy	March 6, 1982
130 131	22 23	"The Experiment"	Roger Duchowny	Fred Grandy and Jan Gough Grandy	March 6, 1982
130 131	22 23	"Getting to Know You"	Roger Duchowny	Harvey Bullock	March 6, 1982
The Pacific Princess competes with another ship while cruising to Alaska; Captain Stubing enters a dog-sled race against the other ship's captain, who is angry that his son is working for Stubing; a man and woman spend the entire cruise in their cabin to get acquainted; a newly separated couple find they cannot handle being apart; a scientist obsesses over his love potion and neglects his girlfriend. Guest stars: Priscilla Barnes as Swedish masseuse/trainer Brittany Sorenson, Douglas Barr as Dave Pursinger, Sonny Bono as Steve Bloom, Tom Bosley as Harry Meacham, Woody Brown as Trig Norquist, Mary Crosby as Megan Lewis, John James as Dr. Skip van Damme, Ted Knight as Captain Gunner Norquist, Michele Lee as Dorothy Meacham, Charlotte Rae as Ellen van Bowe, and Charles Nelson Reilly as Jesse Dobson. "Klondike Carnival" is also known sometimes as "Pride of the Pacific". This episode was dedicated to the memory of R.S. "Ray" Allen, who passed away during Season 5, on October 17, 1981.
132	24	"Isaac Gets Physical"	Bob Sweeney	Richard Albrecht and Casey Keller	March 20, 1982
132	24	"She Brought Her Mother Along"	Bob Sweeney	Fred S. Fox and Seaman Jacobs	March 20, 1982
132	24	"Cold Feet"	Bob Sweeney	Ray Jessel and Cynthia Thompson	March 20, 1982
Isaac avoids a physical exam to hide a congenital condition that could jeopardize his job, while the nurse develops a crush on him; a young woman's older boyfriend turns out to be her mother's former lover; Julie's cousin wants to dump his fiancée. Guest stars: Shirley Hemphill, Connie Needham, Gene Barry, Betsy Palmer, Richard Dean Anderson, Linda Blair.
133	25	"Burl of My Dreams"	Richard Kinon	Jill Baer and Christopher Vane	March 27, 1982
133	25	"Meet the Author"	Richard Kinon	Mike Marmer	March 27, 1982
133	25	"Rhymes, Riddles, and Romance"	Richard Kinon	Ray Jessel and Cynthia Thompson	March 27, 1982
Vicki is infatuated with Gopher; a publisher falls for an author's niece; two try to cheat each other in a treasure hunt. Guest stars: Georgia Engel, Alan Hale, Jared Martin, Joanna Pettet, Paul Williams.
134	26	"Does Father Know Best?"	Ted Lange	Julie Fleischer and Jeffrey Davis	April 10, 1982
134	26	"Pal-I-Mony-O-Mine"	Ted Lange	Donald Ross	April 10, 1982
134	26	"An 'A' for Gopher"	Ted Lange	An 'A' for Gopher	April 10, 1982
A companion befriends a doctor's ex-girlfriend; Gopher falls for a former teacher; a father learns a lesson. Guest stars: Lloyd Bochner, Kevin Brophy, Lynne Moody, Denise Nicholas, Susan Strasberg, Ben Vereen, Kristina Wayborn.
135	27	"April in Boston"	Richard Kinon	Ben Joelson and Art Baer	May 1, 1982
135	27	"Breaks of Life"	Richard Kinon	Mike Marmer	May 1, 1982
135	27	"Saving Grace"	Richard Kinon	Christopher Vane and Jill Baer	May 1, 1982
April Lopez (Charo) is back again, this time as a Spanish tutor to Bradford York (David Hedison), the proper headmaster of a New England boys' boarding school. Brad was widowed four years earlier and wouldn't approve of her chanteuse habits, which may go on display when the planned entertainer cancels and Stubing presses Julie to find a replacement. Lonely widow Grace Bostwick plans to throw herself overboard, but a white-suited man named Gabriel claims to be her guardian angel and may be able to stop her. After ten years of marriage, newly divorced George and Gwen Finley are vacationing together on the same cruise. But their enjoyment is cut short when both of them suffer injuries and wind up in the infirmary together. Guest stars: Jayne Meadows, Charo, David Hedison, Hugh O'Brian, Jane Powell, Gene Rayburn, Max Showalter.
136	28	"A Dress to Remember"	Robert Scheerer	Howard Albrecht and Sol Weinstein	May 8, 1982
An expensive dress involved in each of this episode's storylines. A model sponsored by a diet doctor is the target of the doctor's rival; the captain helps a poor flower merchant reconnect with her long-lost daughter; a man dresses as a woman to avoid his murderous former father-in-law; Gopher and Isaac fret over the care of the dress, afraid their jobs may be at stake. Guest stars: Markie Post, Kelly Monteith, Lyle Waggoner, Eleanor Parker, Catherine Parks, Bob Denver, Brianne Leary, Forrest Tucker.
137	29	"Mothers Don't Do That"	Jerome Courtland	Richard Albrecht and Casey Keller	May 15, 1982
137	29	"Substitute Lover"	Jerome Courtland	Fredi Towbin	May 15, 1982
137	29	"Marrying for Money"	Jerome Courtland	Cynthia Thompson and Ray Jessel	May 15, 1982
A woman's attempt to reconnect with her estranged son goes wrong when he finds what she wrote in her diary; the crew thinks a woman is trying to murder her millionaire husband; an old friend of Julie's pretends to be a woman's pen pal to get close to her. Guest stars: Eva Gabor, Arte Johnson, Caren Kaye. Audrey Landers, Eddie Mekka.

=== Season 6 (1982–83) ===
No. overall	No. in season	Title	Directed by	Written by	Original release date
138 139	1 2	"Venetian Love Song"	Richard Kinon	Mike Marmer	October 2, 1982
138 139	1 2	"Down for the Count"	Richard Kinon	Tony Webster	October 2, 1982
138 139	1 2	"Arrividerci, Gopher"	Richard Kinon	Sid Morse	October 2, 1982
138 139	1 2	"The Arrangement"	Richard Kinon	Mike Marmer	October 2, 1982
The crew goes to Italy: SS Stella Solaris cruises to Rome, Capri, and Venice. Teresa and Dominic decide to separate. Maria discovers her lover is an aristocrat.: Dominic (Ernest Borgnine) and Teresa (Shelley Winters), originally from Italy, are bickering to the point of possible separation.; Their daughters Carmen (Candice Azzara) and Francesca (Meredith Baxter) are also aboard. Francesca meets a man (David Birney), unaware he's a gigolo.; Granddaughter Maria (Marie Osmond), who's been promised to another guy back home, meets a local (John James) and is attracted to him.; Gopher meets a local woman (Christopher Norris) who says he reminds her of someone she knows. While on shore, the man, who's the spitting image of Gopher, kidnaps him and assumes his identity.; Guest stars: Rossano Brazzi
140	3	"The Anniversary Gift"	Ted Lange	Jerry Winnick	October 16, 1982
140	3	"Honey Bee Mine"	Ted Lange	Buddy Atkinson	October 16, 1982
140	3	"Bewigged, Bothered and Bewildered"	Ted Lange	Harvey Bullock	October 16, 1982
A couple celebrating their 20th anniversary (Robert Mandan and Lynn Redgrave) find that even with grown children, she still wants another baby. Julie tries to keep her ex-roommate (Randi Oakes) who has a history of hitting on her boyfriends from hitting on her current beau (Richard Bergman) so she tells her that Gopher is her latest. Gopher goes along even though he is in love with someone else. The Captain's high school classmate (Phyllis Diller) is on board but he is self-conscious about his baldness so he wears a toupee when she is around.
141	4	"The Same Wavelength"	Robert Scheerer	Lan O'Kun	October 23, 1982
141	4	"Winning Isn't Everything"	Robert Scheerer	Joan Brooker & Alexandra Stoddart	October 23, 1982
141	4	"A Honeymoon for Horace"	Robert Scheerer	Buddy Atkinson	October 23, 1982
A psychic (Connie Stevens) comes on board to entertain the passengers and she meets a man (Charles Siebert) who's unsure if he wants to remain with the wife from whom he is currently separated. A friend of Stubing's (David Doyle) comes on board with his son (Matthew Labyorteaux) whom he doesn't see much of. Father can't help but boast of his son's accomplishments, but the son later reveals to Vicki that his accomplishments are not true. And an elderly couple who are engaged (Jack Gilford and Nancy Walker) come on board and the guy is nervous about taking the plunge.
142	5	"Hyde and seek"	Jerome Courtland	Roy Battocchio	October 30, 1982
142	5	"Command Performance"	Jerome Courtland	Ted Lange & Jean Ford	October 30, 1982
142	5	"Sketchy Love"	Jerome Courtland	Lloyd Turner & Howard Liebling	October 30, 1982
A young girl (Kim Richards) who is infatuated with Gopher pretends to be her older sister. An artist (Morgan Brittany) meets an unhappily married guy (Skip Stephenson). And the ship's comic (Dan Rowan) runs into the wife (Marion Ross) and daughter (Eve Plumb) he left years ago. Guest stars: Dana Andrews, Janet Blair
143	6	"The Groupies"	Don Weis	Mike Marmer	November 6, 1982
143	6	"The Audition"	Don Weis	Sid Morse	November 6, 1982
143	6	"Doc's Nephew"	Don Weis	Jesse Dizon & Don Haberman	November 6, 1982
A psychiatrist (Richard Deacon) who specializes in group therapy goes on board for a little vacation but one of his groups joins him. And they still want him to help them. And when two of them (Elaine Joyce and Jerry Van Dyke) get attracted to each other, they don't know what to do. An actor (Tristan Rogers) runs into the writer of a soap (Susan Lucci) who rejected him. She wonders if he has something up his sleeve. Doc's girlfriend (Michelle Phillips) joins him, as does his nephew (Willie Aames). The young man makes a move on her, prompting Doc to challenge him. Guest stars: Morey Amsterdam, Rose Marie Note: Morey Amsterdam, Rose Marie and Richard Deacon appeared on The Dick Van Dyke Show from 1961 to 1966; Jerry Van Dyke had a recurring role on his brother's series, as well.
144 145	7 8	"The Spoonmaker Diamond"	Robert Scheerer	Mike Marmer	November 13, 1982
144 145	7 8	"Papa Doc"	Robert Scheerer	Mike Marmer	November 13, 1982
144 145	7 8	"The Role Model"	Robert Scheerer	Catherine Bacos	November 13, 1982
144 145	7 8	"Julie's Tycoon"	Robert Scheerer	Richard Albrecht & Casey Keller	November 13, 1982
The crew sails on the SS Stella Solaris to Greece and Turkey: The priceless Spoonmaker Diamond is stolen from the Topkapi Museum.; Travel agent Dana Pierce (Polly Bergen) wants to check out the locales for business purposes.; Emmett and Ella Stokes (Harvey Korman and Nancy Dussault) insist they have seen fellow passenger Mark Hayward (Mike Connors) before, but he repeatedly denies it.; Crusading reporter Joe Novak (Kiel Martin) is quietly dating Sabrina Drake (Jan Smithers), whose mother Amanda Drake (Alexis Smith) he libeled in his columns. When Doc finds out that Sabrina is pregnant, he gives serious consideration to marrying her and being the unborn child's surrogate father.; Photographer Cliff Jacobs (David Hedison) runs into his ex-wife Monica Brandon (Linda Evans) on board and wants her to model for him, but she won't do it until he has a definite assignment.; Years ago, Julie sponsored a Greek male child named Gregori Papanopolis (Lorenzo Lamas) through a world relief organization. Now that she's visiting Greece, she looks him up and finds that he is a wealthy businessman. They spend time getting reacquainted.; Inspector Akmed Sadu (Jamie Farr) of Interpol boards the ship and demands that Captain Stubing detain several passengers, including Hayward, whom Sadu seems to know.; Cliff and Monica renew their romance. Meanwhile, Cliff wants Vicki to model for him on an ongoing basis, which could start a career for her.; Dana shows Mark the diamond that she bought at the bazaar, but Emmett and Ella Stokes see her. One passenger has a narrow escape from a car crash.; Sabrina contemplates Doc's marriage proposal, and he tells her that she's pregnant. Doc pinch-hits for Merrill in showing Amanda around the Istanbul Museum but is interrupted by Joe Novak, who demands to speak to her, alone.; Gregori proposes marriage to Julie.; Emmett Stokes and Mark Hayward's real association is revealed and the Spoonmaker Diamond changes hands.; Guest stars: Craig Stevens
146	9	"Thanksgiving Cruise: Too Many Dads"	Richard Kinon	Ray Jessel & Cynthia Thompson	November 20, 1982
146	9	"Love Will Find a Way"	Richard Kinon	Ann Gibbs & Joel Kimmel	November 20, 1982
146	9	"The Best of Friends"	Richard Kinon	Ben Joelson & Art Baer	November 20, 1982
It is Thanksgiving, and among the passengers is a woman (Wendy Schaal) who wants to introduce her fiancé (Jim Knaub) to her parents (Lorne Greene and Dorothy McGuire) but she neglected to tell them that he is a paraplegic. A father (Richard Hatch) and his son (Christian Jacobs) are trying to get away from the boy's natural father (Michael Lembeck) who wants to take him away. And the crew is bickering with each other to the point that they're not speaking with each other. Note: Lorne Greene and Richard Hatch had previously played father and son in the original Battlestar Galactica.
147	10	"The Man in the Iron Shorts"	Jerome Courtland	Story by : Arnold Kane; Teleplay by : Harvey Bullock	November 27, 1982
147	10	"The Victims"	Jerome Courtland	Sid Morse	November 27, 1982
147	10	"Heavens to Betsy"	Jerome Courtland	Harvey Bullock	November 27, 1982
Gopher returns from vacation with a new girlfriend Gail Cowler (Taylor Miller), who is a history teacher. He also has a trunk carrying a suit of armor, which he dons to impress her. But when Isaac tries to help him get out of the suit, he breaks the bolt and traps Gopher inside. Captain Stubing's longtime friend Joan Heinsley (Ruth Warrick) was widowed in a drunk driving crash, years earlier. The pain of losing her husband never completely healed and now intensifies as her daughter Vanessa (Denise Miller) falls for Webb Jones Junior (Laurence Lau), the son of the drunk driver who took Joan's husband's life. Reverend David Ruland (Robert Pine) leads a mission study society on board the cruise, but two of his members, Betsy Dunbar (Janine Turner) and Laura Tenley (Sharon Gabet) are smitten with him.
148	11	"The Tomorrow Lady"	Richard A. Wells	Story by : Roy Kammerman; Teleplay by : Harvey Bullock	December 4, 1982
148	11	"Father, Dear Father"	Richard A. Wells	Larry Markes & Sidney Reznick	December 4, 1982
148	11	"Still Life"	Richard A. Wells	Harvey Bullock	December 4, 1982
Glen Leciter (Howard Duff) meets Alice Bailey (Greer Garson), a woman who, by her admission, is a "good guesser." He plans to use her clairvoyant gift to win big in the stock market. Sarah Curtis (Kim Darby) wants to get to know bachelor Ken Miller (Lawrence Pressman) better because she thinks he's a single parent. Ken borrows his friend Tom MacDonald's (Jim Stafford) daughter Libby (Louanne), who is a budding actress, to act the part of his daughter and impress Sarah. When Isaac experiences hearing loss, Doc diagnoses the problem as a temporary middle ear infection in both ears. But, Isaac fears that the hearing loss may be permanent.
149	12	"Baby Talk"	Robert Scheerer	Haskell Barkin	December 11, 1982
149	12	"My Friend, the Executrix"	Robert Scheerer	Tony Webster	December 11, 1982
149	12	"Programmed for Love"	Robert Scheerer	Donald Ross	December 11, 1982
Connie Pierce (Donna Pescow) feels left out when her husband Steve (Grant Goodeve) takes a liking to Jan Willis (Angela Cartwright), who is to be their baby's surrogate mother. Julie's recently widowed Aunt Sylvia (Carol Channing) visits with her friend Betsy Boucher (Betty White), who has been named the executrix of the estate and obsessively nags Sylvia to conserve money. Ruth Gaylor (Karen Morrow) falls for inventor Franklin Trumbauer (Peter Marshall), who doesn't notice her because he's too busy attending to his ever-present creation: a robot named Bix.
150	13	"The Christmas Presence"	Richard Kinon	David & Michele Swift	December 18, 1982
On a Christmas cruise, a senior citizen named Angelarum Dominicus (Mickey Rooney) is present in the lives of several other passengers. The crew members argue over how to decorate the ship for the holidays while Captain Stubing grows impatient. Jim and Lori Markham (Donny Osmond and Maureen McCormick) are taking their first vacation in years, with him being frustrated by her workaholic tendencies that keep them apart. Sisters Regina and Bernadette (Teresa Wright and Jan Rooney) chaperone the members of the Good Shepherd Boys' Choir en route to their home in Acapulco. The nuns don't know they're carrying gold stolen by Charlie Dobbs (Keenan Wynn) and Henry Beemus (Henry Gibson) to its final destination.
151	14	"Paroled to Love"	Robert Scheerer	Tony Webster	January 8, 1983
151	14	"First Impressions"	Robert Scheerer	Jan Gough Grandy	January 8, 1983
151	14	"Love Finds Florence Nightingale"	Robert Scheerer	Ben Joelson & Art Baer	January 8, 1983
This cruise is supposed to have some celebrities among the passengers. But the PR employees (Debbie Reynolds and Marilyn Michaels) booked them on a different cruise. So they end up impersonating celebrities. A celebrity (Carole Cook), doing research for her role as Florence Nightingale by working as Doc's nurse, meets a passenger (Forrest Tucker) who doesn't like show business types. A man (Richard Kline) who was accused of a crime but acquitted, goes on the cruise with the lawyer (Vicki Lawrence) who defended him. Making admissions to each other, she reveals she loves him and he reveals he committed the crime he was charged with.
152	15	"The Captain's Replacement"	Bob Sweeney	Tony Webster	January 15, 1983
152	15	"Sly as a Fox"	Bob Sweeney	Buddy Atkinson	January 15, 1983
152	15	"Here Comes the Bride – Maybe"	Bob Sweeney	F. Michael Johnson	January 15, 1983
Capt. Stubing mentors Captain Donahue (McLean Stevenson), whom Gopher thinks is out to take command of the Pacific Princess. Ben Phillips (Frank Bonner) and Henry Greg (Arte Johnson) seem to be aggressively competing for the affection of Mary Frances Bellflower (Shelley Fabares), who claims that they're only after her foxhound. Doc's longtime friend Erica Dupont (Jenilee Harrison) works on the cruise to help her mother pay for her wedding to wealthy fiancé Robert Wallingford (Stephen Shortridge), who, along with his socially snobbish parents Harold and Margaret (William Windom) and (Jane Wyatt), thinks she's wealthy as well. But then Harold and Margaret turn up on the same cruise, leading Erica to try to hide from them.
153	16	"Doc's Big Case"	Bob Sweeney	Barry Blitzer	January 22, 1983
153	16	"Senior Sinners"	Bob Sweeney	Harvey Bullock	January 22, 1983
153	16	"A Booming Romance"	Bob Sweeney	Roy Kammerman	January 22, 1983
Doc's medical school chum, Dr. Elliot Norton (James Noble), gives Vicki some information for an article on Doc. Norton's soon besieged with requests for interviews, leaving Doc feeling very insecure about his accomplishments, which pale in comparison. Tom Niver (Raymond St. Jacques) and Faye Phillips (Theresa Merritt) are seniors living together without being married. They introduce his son Jeffrey (Brian Stokes Mitchell) to her daughter Velma (Telma Hopkins), both of whom object to their parents' domestic arrangement. Computer genius Ross (Alan Young) meets longtime friend Kathy Brighton (Holland Taylor) aboard the ship, but is afraid of losing her to masculine passenger Bob Williams (Adam West). While taking Kathy on a tour of the ship, Ross finds something startling in the cargo hold. Guest star: Tori Spelling
154	17	"Gopher's Daisy"	Richard Kinon	Mark Marmer	January 29, 1983
154	17	"Our Son, the Lawyer"	Richard Kinon	Jerry Winnick	January 29, 1983
154	17	"Salvaged Romance"	Richard Kinon	Kevin Hartigan	January 29, 1983
Gopher buys a Daisy exercise machine to improve his physique but doesn't want the other crew members to know about it. Meanwhile, an attractive girl (Chanelle Lea) keeps sneaking into his cabin while he's out. Doc, Isaac, and Julie are confused by the sounds of his exercising and by the girl's comings and goings. They eventually jump to the wrong conclusion that he's having a very physical affair with the girl. Long-married Lou and Harriet Stevens (James Coco and Doris Roberts) bicker a great deal. Their 25-year-old son Jonathan (Adam Arkin) is a divorce lawyer who announces plans to move out of the family homestead and into a bachelor pad, leaving Harriet traumatized. She reacts so emotionally that it leads her and Lou to contemplate divorce, and both of them want Jonathan to represent them. Society matron Allison Newman (Joan Rivers)'s romance with junk dealer Max Glutovsky (Alex Rocco) is threatened due to the lingering insecurity she feels from her first husband divorcing her after she underwent a successful mastectomy.
155 156	18 19	"Isaac's Aegean Affair"	Alan Rafkin	Christopher Vane & Jill Baer	February 5, 1983
155 156	18 19	"The Captain and the Kid"	Alan Rafkin	Fred S. Fox & Seaman Jacobs	February 5, 1983
155 156	18 19	"Poor Rich Man"	Alan Rafkin	Fred S. Fox & Seaman Jacobs	February 5, 1983
155 156	18 19	"The Dean and the Flunkee"	Alan Rafkin	Fred S. Fox & Seaman Jacobs	February 5, 1983
The crew is in Greece working a cruise a college is having its graduation ceremony aboard: Dean Burton (Eddie Albert) is attracted to a teacher Priscilla (Shirley Jones) who rebuffs him because he won't give a student a make-up test so he can graduate. Making matters worse, the student and a couple of his friends are hounding the principal about the makeup test.; A prodigy Charles (Jimmy McNichol) is attracted to Vicki, which doesn't make the Captain happy.; The valedictorian (Parker Stevenson), whose education was provided by his Greek aunt (Eva Marie Saint) whom he assumed is wealthy, learns she's just a woman of humble means. When she arrives on board, he does not tell anyone who she is, not even his girlfriend (Lisa Whelchel).; Isaac meets a woman who is estranged from her husband (Debbie Allen). Vicki falls in love, while a beloved crew member decides to leave the ship.; Guest stars: Leigh McCloskey, William R. Moses
157	20	"The Zinging Valentine"	Richard Kinon	Ben Joelson & Art Baer	February 12, 1983
157	20	"The Very Temporary Secretary"	Richard Kinon	Joseph A. Goodson	February 12, 1983
157	20	"Final Score"	Richard Kinon	Lan O'Kun	February 12, 1983
A woman who delivers singing telegrams (Claudia Lonow) ends up stuck aboard after delivering a "Dear John" message to a passenger (Donny Most). A temp agency owner (Don Adams) takes the place of the secretary scheduled to sail with a magazine editor (Fannie Flagg). An NFL quarterback (John Amos)'s attempt to get close to an English professor (Jayne Kennedy) keeps getting penalty flags.
158	21	"The Captain's Crush"	Ted Lange	Ben Joelson & Art Baer	February 19, 1983
158	21	"Out of My Hair"	Ted Lange	Haskell Barkin	February 19, 1983
158	21	"Off-Course Romance"	Ted Lange	Jill Baer & Christopher Vane	February 19, 1983
Movie star Janine Adams (Joan Collins), who has been divorced from nine husbands, boards the Princess for a cruise without knowing that a tabloid reporter is in tow to write a story about her love life. When Capt. Stubing develops feelings for her, speculation arises that he could become her tenth husband. Lydia Harris (Delta Burke) plans to marry her wealthy fiancé Lawrence Jurgens (Jeffrey Tambor) in Acapulco, but her ex-lover/ex-hairdresser Ron (Richard Gilliland) is on the same cruise and is determined to win her back. Frustrated golf widow Kathy Costello (Stella Stevens) takes the cruise alone, while her husband Joe (Monte Markham) plays in a tournament. Kathy is reunited with her former lover Ted Cole (Ron Ely) after a separation of ten years.
159	22	"Abby's Maiden Voyage"	Jerome Courtland	Barbara Allyn	February 26, 1983
159	22	"He Ain't Heavy"	Jerome Courtland	Ted Lange & Jean Ford	February 26, 1983
159	22	"I Like to Be in America"	Jerome Courtland	Richard Albrecht & Casey Keller	February 26, 1983
After being let go by her employer, April Lopez (Charo) plans to move back home to Mexico. She wants to become an American citizen but always gets nervous and crumbles during the oral exam. A passenger, Judge Kramer (Esther Rolle), is summoned to help her take the citizenship test. George and Phyllis Cowens (Don Porter and Barbara Billingsley) treat their adopted son Jimmy (Michael J. Fox) to a cruise as a high school graduation gift. Jimmy mistreats Gregory Steven Leonard (Gregg Henry), one of the ship's waiters. Animosity develops quickly between the two, who soon learn that they have a connection. Inexperienced young Abby Foster (Mary Beth McDonough) wants to have her first time with a man and meets handsome fellow passenger Neil Holmes (Brodie Greer). But whenever they become intimate, she breaks up laughing and kills the mood. Guest stars: Constance Forslund
160	23	"Discount Romance"	Jack Arnold	Henry Coleman	March 5, 1983
160	23	"Vicki's Dilemma"	Jack Arnold	Roy Battocchio	March 5, 1983
160	23	"Loser and Still Champ"	Jack Arnold	Lan O'Kun	March 5, 1983
Vicki hooks up with a young passenger Mark (Glenn Scarpelli) who gives her some pills he claims are supplements. After the boy gets ill, Doc deduces it's from drug use. When the pills are found on Vicki, the boy's mother Andrea (Elinor Donahue) accuses Vicki of giving her son the drugs. Gopher's uncle Jimmy (Red Buttons), a salesman, sets up a little shop in his cabin which undermines the ship's gift shop. He takes a liking to the woman Shirley (June Allyson) in charge of the gift shop, whose job could be in jeopardy because she's not making any sales. A guy Tom (Patrick Wayne) traveling with his girlfriend Stacy (Ann Turkel) feels emasculated because she's better at the things he likes to do.
161	24	"So Help Me Hannah"	Kim Friedman	Mike Marmer	March 12, 1983
161	24	"C.P.R., I.O.U."	Kim Friedman	Daryl Busby & Gerry Kroll	March 12, 1983
161	24	"The Maid Cleans Up"	Kim Friedman	Hudson Hickman & Alexander Marrant	March 12, 1983
A woman (Mary Martin)'s ability to dispense advice irritates the Captain as well as the father Jarvis (Max Showalter) of a young man who wants to pursue his path Kent (Timothy Patrick Murphy). A maid Dee Dee (Judy Landers) goes on the cruise to win the heart of her employer Gregory (Ben Murphy). Will the budding relationship be doomed by his girlfriend Meredith (Caren Kaye)? Gopher's CPR course comes in handy after a retired passenger (Milton Berle), who feels his son Dwaine (Steven Keats) isn't working hard enough at the family plumbing business, has a heart attack.
162	25	"Going to the Dogs"	Bob Sweeney	Ben Joelson & Art Baer	March 26, 1983
162	25	"Putting on the Dog"	Bob Sweeney	Richard Albrecht & Casey Keller	March 26, 1983
162	25	"Women's Best Friend"	Bob Sweeney	Tony Webster	March 26, 1983
162	25	"Whose Dog Is It Anyway"	Bob Sweeney	Christopher Vane & Jill Baer	March 26, 1983
A contest is held on board to determine which dog will be on the cover of dog food containers: A woman (Catherine Bach) thinks a dog belonging to another passenger (Dirk Benedict) is one she lost some time ago.; Isaac's Aunt Tanya (Isabel Sanford) enters her pet and is pampering him so much, her husband Charles (Mel Stewart) feels neglected.; Gopher and Isaac get a dog (Tundra the Wonder Dog), enter him in the contest, seem to have trouble training him, and sell him to Vicki.; A mail clerk from the dog food company (Ray Buktenica) poses as the company president Jack (Gordon Jump), who's really in Las Vegas with another woman. Things get complicated when the clerk connects with a passenger Wendy (Heather Thomas) and has a surprise visit from his "wife" (Jo Anne Worley).; Guest stars: Chuck McCann, Moore's Mongrel Revue Notes: This is a 90-minute episode.
163	26	"The Professor Has Class"	Richard Kinon	Tony Webster	April 2, 1983
163	26	"When the Magic Disappears"	Richard Kinon	Dan Kallis	April 2, 1983
163	26	"We, the Jury"	Richard Kinon	Mike Marmer	April 2, 1983
Professor Roscoe Weber (Sam Jaffe), a 91-year-old Nobel Prize winner for psychology, doesn't realize that his adoring former pupil, Professor Helen Burton (Bettye Ackerman), has been hired by his university to replace him. Expert magician The Great Stellini (Dick Van Patten) disapproves of his daughter Christina (Mary-Margaret Humes)'s suitor, novice magician Joey Gardiner (Barry Van Dyke), who he thinks wants to steal his secrets. Minnie Dunlop (Anne Meara) used to be Harlan Weatherly (Jerry Stiller)'s landlady before his damage to the apartment drove her to file a lawsuit against him. The crew holds a simulated small claims court for Minnie and Harlan. Note: Both Sam Jaffe & Bettye Ackerman and Anne Meara & Jerry Stiller were married in real life.
164 165	27 28	"Country Music Jamboree: Hits and Missus"	Richard Kinon	Unknown	April 30, 1983
164 165	27 28	"Return of Annabelle"	Richard Kinon	Unknown	April 30, 1983
164 165	27 28	"Just Plain Folks Medicine"	Richard Kinon	Unknown	April 30, 1983
164 165	27 28	"Caught in the Act"	Richard Kinon	Unknown	April 30, 1983
164 165	27 28	"The Real Thing"	Richard Kinon	Unknown	April 30, 1983
164 165	27 28	"Do Not Disturb"	Richard Kinon	Unknown	April 30, 1983
164 165	27 28	"Lulu and Kenny"	Richard Kinon	Unknown	April 30, 1983
Aboard a country music jamboree cruise: Gopher thwarts an incognito Dottie West's plans for a restful weekend. He also borrows kitchen implements without asking from Chef Loomis (Pat Buttram) so the crew can create an opening act for the jamboree.; Singer Holly Hartman (Jessica Walter) discovers her husband Danny (Mel Tillis) is writing songs under a pseudonym for chart-topping singer C.G. Thomas (Tanya Tucker).; Annabelle Folker (Florence Henderson) returns with a golfer boyfriend Ted Myler (Bert Convy) and three orphans (Neil Billingsley, Angela Lee Sloan, and Michael Evans) whose parents died en route to one of her concerts. The orphans try to upset Ted, so he'll bow out and enable Annabelle to spend more time with them.; Effie Skaggs (Minnie Pearl) upsets Doc and Capt. Stubing by handing out bottles of her homemade folk remedy "Aunt Effie's Elixir," thus practicing medicine without a license.; Jeannie Davis's (Beth Howland)' jewelry attracts the attention of outspoken jeweler Henry Bullard (Sherman Hemsley), who knows that it's real. Jeannie is desperate to keep this news from her husband, Bill (Steve Kanaly) because revealing the secret could jeopardize their marriage.; Plus-sized Kenny Creek (Kenny Price) and Lulu Dixon (Lulu Roman) take full advantage of the food served on board. Ted gives Annabelle an ultimatum: either the kids fly home or he does. Effie gets sick but refuses to let Doc examine her.; Guest stars: Misty Rowe
166	29	"Fountain of Youth"	Robert Scheerer	Unknown	May 7, 1983
166	29	"Bad Luck Cabin"	Robert Scheerer	Unknown	May 7, 1983
166	29	"Uncle Daddy"	Robert Scheerer	Unknown	May 7, 1983
Decades ago, Dwight Scoffield (David Wayne) bilked Henry Harper in a land deal. Taking a cruise with granddaughter Stacy (Michelle Tobin), Dwight encounters Henry (Ted McGinley), who claims a fountain of youth is responsible for his not aging in the past fifty years. Newlyweds Cora (Lynda Goodfriend) and Edwin Winnaker (David Naughton) are booked into Cabin 213 on the Fiesta Deck, which Gopher claims is a bad luck cabin for all newlyweds. Sure enough, as soon as Cora and Edwin arrive, a string of bad luck begins for the couple. Isaac's widowed friend Gayle Davis (Tracy Reed) is on the cruise with her son, Bobby (Shavar Ross). Gayle has marriage on her mind, but Isaac isn't sure that he's ready for matrimony.

=== Season 7 (1983–84) ===
No. overall	No. in season	Title	Directed by	Written by	Original release date
167 168	1 2	"The Pledge"	Robert Scheerer	Lan O'Kun	October 1, 1983
167 168	1 2	"East Meets West"	Robert Scheerer	Christopher Vane & Jill Baer	October 1, 1983
167 168	1 2	"Dear Roberta"	Robert Scheerer	Lawrence Levy & Robert Spears	October 1, 1983
167 168	1 2	"My Two Dumplings"	Robert Scheerer	Richard Albrecht & Casey Keller	October 1, 1983
A woman suffering from end stage heart failure and a man wanted in the U.S. for killing a drug dealer to protect his students begin a romance. The police detective who has been tracking him is coincidentally vacationing on the ship. Doc falls for a woman who spurns Western medicine because her mother had died during a routine operation. A man who writes the advice column "Dear Roberta" meets a woman who blames the column for her divorce. A friend of Gopher who is dating two women is on board to decide which one he truly loves, unaware that both women are also on the cruise. Location filming in Hong Kong, Shanghai, and Beijing, and on MS Pearl of Scandinavia. Guest stars: Ursula Andress as Carole, Susan Anton as Leslie, Michael Constantine as Charlie, Linda Evans as Barbara, John Forsythe as Burt, Lee Horsley as Greg, Pat Klous as Laurie, Lee Majors as Robert, Erin Moran as Joanne Note: Linda Evans was so-starring with John Forsythe in Dynasty at the time, and had previously co-starred with Lee Majors on The Big Valley.
169	3	"Bricker's Boy"	Jerome Courtland	Story by : Bernie Kopell & Fred Grandy	October 8, 1983
169	3	"Lotions of Love"	Jerome Courtland	Lloyd Turner & Howard Liebling	October 8, 1983
169	3	"The Hustlers"	Jerome Courtland	John Whelpley; Teleplay by : Tony Webster	October 8, 1983
A young man claims that he is Doc's son; an ad executive collaborates on a campaign with the daughter of his latest client; a professional escort of an older woman falls for another younger woman. Guest stars: Chuck Connors as Roy, Lydia Cornell as Sandy, Constance Forslund as Fran, Brodie Greer as Andy O'Neal, Evelyn Keyes as Mrs. Parker, Ted McGinley as Gary Thomas, Vera Miles as Arlene Kemper, Timothy Patrick Murphy as David
170	4	"Youth Takes a Holiday"	Robert Scheerer	David Ketchum & Tony DiMarco	October 15, 1983
170	4	"Don't Leave Home Without It"	Robert Scheerer	Richard A. Goldman	October 15, 1983
170	4	"Prisoner of Love"	Robert Scheerer	Donald Ross	October 15, 1983
An Army captain sets her sights on Gopher; a married couple meets up with two swingers. Guest stars: Gloria DeHaven, Jamie Farr, Beth Howland, Heather Locklear, Louis Nye, Charlotte Rae, Glenn Scarpelli, Cornel Wilde
171	5	"Rhino of the Year"	Don Weis	Unknown	October 22, 1983
171	5	"One Last Time"	Don Weis	Unknown	October 22, 1983
171	5	"For Love or Money"	Don Weis	Unknown	October 22, 1983
A divorcing couple decides they'll go another round before the final papers come; a do-gooder hires a sex therapist to help an impotent friend. Guest stars: Mike Douglas, Paul Kreppel, Kevin McCarthy, Donna Pescow, Paul Sand, Stella Stevens
172	6	"Affair on Demand"	Ted Lange	Jerry Winnick	October 29, 1983
172	6	"Just Another Pretty Face"	Ted Lange	Ronnie Cass & Donald Ross	October 29, 1983
172	6	"Friend of the Family"	Ted Lange	Joan Brooker & Alexandra Stoddart	October 29, 1983
A man cons his wife into insisting he has an affair; a man orders an end to the romance between his daughter and his best friend. Guest stars: Cathryn Damon, Florence Henderson, Gordon Jump, Kim Lankford, Robert Reed, Deborah Shelton, Clint Walker Note: Florence Henderson and Robert Reed both starred on The Brady Bunch on ABC, from 1969 to 1974.
173 174	7 8	"When Worlds Collide"	Jerome Courtland	Unknown	November 5, 1983
173 174	7 8	"The Captain and the Geisha"	Jerome Courtland	Unknown	November 5, 1983
173 174	7 8	"The Lottery Winners"	Jerome Courtland	Unknown	November 5, 1983
173 174	7 8	"The Emperor's Fortune"	Jerome Courtland	Unknown	November 5, 1983
On a Japanese junket, a teacher impersonates a geisha to stay near the Captain; lottery winners carry their rags-to-riches routine to comic heights; a girl and her mother fall in love with two strangers. Guest stars: Tony Danza as Bud O'Hara, Mariette Hartley as Martha Chambers, Ted Knight as Barney Gordon, Harvey Korman as Harvey Willis, Jean Marsh as Celia Hoffman, Rita Moreno as Gladys Gordon, Nancy Morgan as Joanie Hoffman, John Ritter as Ben Cummins, James Shigeta as Bud's Father, and Heather Thomas as Lila Pearsall: Nancy Morgan and John Ritter were married at the time of filming.
175	9	"Bear Essence"	Don Weis	Richard A. Goldman	November 12, 1983
175	9	"Kisses and Makeup"	Don Weis	Mike Marmer	November 12, 1983
175	9	"Long time no see"	Don Weis	Story by : Ben Joelson & Art Baer; Teleplay by : Hollace White & Stephanie Garman	November 12, 1983
A carnival owner gets mixed messages from a woman; a comedy duo falls for the same woman. Guest stars: Crystal Bernard, Dean Butler, Howard Keel, Michael Lembeck, Christopher Mayer, Randi Oakes, Jan Smithers
176	10	"Julie and the Bachelor"	Richard Kinon	David Ketchum & Tony DiMarco	November 19, 1983
176	10	"Set-up for Romance"	Richard Kinon	Lloyd Turner & Howard Liebling	November 19, 1983
176	10	"Intensive Care"	Richard Kinon	Jim Rogers	November 19, 1983
An executive is entangled in an affair between his co-worker and their boss; Doc and Gopher are smitten by a pretty nurse but her invalid charge interferes. Guest stars: Tom Bosley, Patricia Carr, Bradford Dillman, Penny Fuller, Mark Harmon, Engelbert Humperdinck, Cristina Raines
177	11	"The World's Greatest Kisser"	Ted Lange	Buddy Atkinson	November 26, 1983
177	11	"Don't Take My Wife, Please"	Ted Lange	Richard A. Goldman	November 26, 1983
177	11	"The Reluctant Father"	Ted Lange	Martin Donovan	November 26, 1983
A jilted fiancé hires a Mata Hari to find the crew member that ruined his wedding plans; a junior executive suffers in silence while his boss lusts after his bride. Guest stars: Kirstie Alley, Danielle Brisebois, William Christopher, David Doyle, Dan Haggerty, Cindy Hayes, Elaine Joyce, Parker Stevenson: Kirstie Alley and Parker Stevenson were dating during the filming of this episode and married in December after the episode aired.
178	12	"Julie's Blind Date"	Richard Kinon	Howard Albrecht & Sol Weinstein	December 3, 1983
178	12	"Dee Dee's Dilemma"	Richard Kinon	Jill Baer & Christopher Vane	December 3, 1983
178	12	"The Prize Winner"	Richard Kinon	Tony Webster	December 3, 1983
A woman (Markie Post), who is being sought by a private detective (Don Gordon) to testify in a messy divorce case, sneaks on board disguised as a young girl. With and without her disguise, she finds herself being pursued by a father (Geoffrey Scott) and his son (Clark Brandon), respectively. A guy (Walter Olkewicz) whom Julie (Lauren Tewes) was set up with is not exactly her type; but before she could dump him, he dumps her, and this bruises her ego. An author (Tom Poston) who recently won a literary prize, comes on board with his wife (Abby Dalton) and his assistant (Leslie Easterbrook). The assistant knows that the book he wrote was not entirely written by him and is using this knowledge to blackmail him into having an affair with her. Guest stars: Clark Brandon as Jerry Howard, Abby Dalton as Ellen Baker, Leslie Easterbrook as Wendy, Don Gordon as Frank Fenimore, Walter Olkewicz as Leonard Gluck, Markie Post as Doris Holden / Dee Dee, Tom Poston as Daniel Baker, and Geoffrey Scott as Phil Howard.
179	13	"The Misunderstanding"	Robert Scheerer	Michael Grace	December 10, 1983
179	13	"Love Below Decks"	Robert Scheerer	Story by : McLean Stevenson & Mike Marmer	December 10, 1983
179	13	"The End Is Near"	Robert Scheerer	Rick Shaw & Brian Pollock; Teleplay by : Mike Marmer	December 10, 1983
A retired actress (Claire Trevor) seeks help from her son-in-law (James Houghton) in effecting a reconciliation with her daughter (Morgan Brittany); a widowed passenger (Arlene Dahl) has a shipboard romance with the ship's engineer (Vic Tayback); two newlyweds (Delta Burke and Lou Richards) cause havoc as the husband is convinced the world is coming to an end. Guest stars: Morgan Brittany, Delta Burke, Arlene Dahl, James Houghton, Lou Richards, Vic Tayback, Claire Trevor
180	14	"Love on Strike"	Richard A. Wells	David Abrams	December 17, 1983
180	14	"Looking for Mr. Wilson"	Richard A. Wells	Story by : Shea E. Butler; Teleplay by : Mike Marmer	December 17, 1983
180	14	"The Last Case"	Richard A. Wells	Story by : Ben Joelson & Art Baer; Teleplay by : Richard Albrecht & Casey Keller	December 17, 1983
A detective traveling with his secretary investigates the case of a vanished passenger; an engaged couple is harassed by his jilted fiancée. Guest stars: Claude Akins, Didi Conn, Tony Dow, Grant Goodeve, John Hillerman, Allyn Ann McLerie, Wendy Schaal, Jeannie Wilson, R.J. Williams
181	15	"How Do I Love Thee?"	Kim Friedman	Mike Marmer	January 7, 1984
181	15	"No More Alimony"	Kim Friedman	Howard Albrecht & Sol Weinstein	January 7, 1984
181	15	"Authoress! Authoress!"	Kim Friedman	Tony Webster	January 7, 1984
Captain Stubing reunites with an old friend (Rue McClanahan) but when she shows up for a cruise breakfast with bruises, he suspects her salesman husband (Dick Van Patten) is abusing her; a man named Alan Price (Alan Thicke) tries to rush his ex-wife Sheila (Michelle Phillips) into marrying her new fiance Lou (Fred Willard) so he will no longer have to pay alimony; Aunt Sylvia (Carol Channing) and her friend Betsy (Betty White) try to persuade a famous publisher (Cesar Romero) to print Betsy's memoirs. Guest stars: Carol Channing as Aunt Sylvia Duvall, Rue McClanahan as Laura Thornton Hayes, Michelle Phillips as Sheila Price, Cesar Romero as John Drake, Alan Thicke as Alan Price, Dick Van Patten as George Hayes, Betty White as Betsy Boucher, and Fred Willard as Lou. Also Starring: Christie Claridge as Cindy Note: Betty White and Rue McClanahan both appeared on Mama's Family in 1983-84. They would later star on The Golden Girls on NBC from 1985 to 1992, and on its spinoff show, The Golden Palace on CBS in 1992.
182	16	"The Buck Stops Here"	Richard Kinon	Unknown	January 14, 1984
182	16	"For Bettor or Worse"	Richard Kinon	Unknown	January 14, 1984
182	16	"Bet on It"	Richard Kinon	Unknown	January 14, 1984
A gambling cruise for charity proves a chancy thing for a teacher (McLean Stevenson), two honeymooners (Leah Ayres and Shea Farrell), and the charity drive chairwoman (Celeste Holm). Guest Stars: Leah Ayres as Nancy Sidon, Shea Farrell as Stewart Sidon, Celeste Holm as Florence Flanders, Richard Jaeckel as Frank Bannon, Jo Ann Pflug as Sally, and McLean Stevenson as Michael Borden. Other Guests: Antony Ponzini as Al Dixon, Gil Mandelik as Croupier, and Sam Nickens as Ship Passenger (uncredited).
183	17	"Aunt Emma, I Love You"	Don Weis	Unknown	January 21, 1984
183	17	"Hoopla"	Don Weis	Unknown	January 21, 1984
183	17	"The First Romance"	Don Weis	Unknown	January 21, 1984
Bound for an exhibition game, the Harlem Globetrotters become wary of their promoter; a painting ruins a second honeymoon. Guest stars: Sid Caesar, Bert Convy, Irena Ferris, Darrow Igus, Rose Marie, Philip McKeon, Jimmy Blacklock, Lou Dunbar, Billy Ray Hobley, Curly Neal, Gator Rivers, and the Harlem Globetrotters ("Hoopla")
184	18	"Ace in the Hole"	Richard Kinon	Unknown	January 28, 1984
184	18	"Uncle Joey's Song"	Richard Kinon	Unknown	January 28, 1984
184	18	"Father in the Cradle"	Richard Kinon	Unknown	January 28, 1984
A photographer (Ted McGinley) joins the crew and when all the girls — especially two sisters (Julie Ronnie and K.C. Winkler) who Doc and Gopher are interested in — throw themselves at him, it makes the guys unhappy. The retired host of a children's show, “Uncle Joey” (Barnard Hughes), comes aboard and tries to help a traumatized boy (David Faustino), whose father died recently. A guy (Michael Spound) comes aboard to meet his mother (Lee Meriwether), who just got married but is not happy that the guy (Dean Paul Martin) she married is almost his age. Guest stars: Barnard Hughes as Joseph Stobble, Dean Paul Martin as Brad Elliott, Ted McGinley as Ashley 'Ace' Covington Evans, Lee Meriwether as Jessica Chapman-Elliott, Michael Spound as Larry Chapman, and Carlene Watkins as Mrs. Susan Russell. Other Guests: David Faustino as Scott Russell, Julie Ronnie as Jeannie Colby, K.C. Winkler as Caroline Colby, and David Armstrong as Passenger (uncredited). Note: Ted McGinley is listed as a Guest Star in the opening credits, and introduced in the opening scene as the new ship’s photographer, and a longtime family friend to Gopher. In the final scene, Ace explains to the Captain that he will be taking full-time photography classes and be back in three weeks. Note: Ted McGinley and David Faustino starred on the sitcom Married... with Children from 1990 through 1997.
185 186	19 20	"Polly's Poker Palace"	Richard Kinon	Unknown	February 4, 1984
185 186	19 20	"Shop Ahoy"	Richard Kinon	Unknown	February 4, 1984
185 186	19 20	"Double Date"	Richard Kinon	Unknown	February 4, 1984
185 186	19 20	"The Hong Kong Affair"	Richard Kinon	Unknown	February 4, 1984
185 186	19 20	"Two Tails of a City"	Richard Kinon	Unknown	February 4, 1984
On a Hong Kong cruise: a Senator romances a woman until he learns the nature of her visit; two brothers date Julie and Vicki; a woman passenger is a shopaholic; a retired spy is on vacation and romances a woman passenger. Guest stars: Herb Edelman as Robert Savage, Noel Harrison as Trevor Staines, Pamela Hensley as Kathy James, Gene Kelly as Charles Dane, Lee Majors II as Jimmy Adams, Frank Maxwell as Colonel Charles Holmsey, Leigh McCloskey as Peter Adams, Yvette Mimieux as Leni Martek, Ben Murphy as Matthew Saver, Donna Reed as Polly Sullivan, Brenda Vaccaro as Eleanor Savage, and Efrem Zimbalist Jr. as Senator Dan Whitman
187	21	"Ace's Valet"	Unknown	Unknown	February 25, 1984
187	21	"Mother Comes First"	Unknown	Unknown	February 25, 1984
187	21	"Hit or Miss America"	Unknown	Unknown	February 25, 1984
Ace's parents send the family valet, Ernest Finley (Jeremy Brett), to be his valet on the ship, but Ace is afraid that Finley will embarrass him in front of the other crew members. Mrs. Rhodes (Marian Mercer) is afraid of growing old, so her daughter Jenny (Audrey Landers) tries to fix her up with eligible men, by recruiting Gopher to pose as an Eastern Indian named Punjab Singh. Isaac's high school friend, Cassie (Gloria Gifford), wants him to be her date for their upcoming reunion, but he only has eyes for Vanessa Williams, who is one of four Miss Americas on board. And Vanessa has an admirer of her own, Tyrone (Glynn Turman). Miss America (Vanessa Williams) dazzles Isaac; A woman (Audrey Landers) seeks a date for her mother; A butler complicates Ace's job. Guest Stars: Jeremy Brett as Ernest Finley, Audrey Landers Jenny Rhodes, Ted McGinley as Ashley 'Ace' Covington Evans, Marian Mercer as Mrs. Rhodes, Glynn Turman as Tyrone, and Vanessa Williams as herself (as Miss America 1984). Other Guests: Gloria Gifford as Cassie Jones, Jean Bartel as herself (as Miss America 1943), Marian McKnight as herself (as Miss America 1957), and Nancy Fleming as herself (as Miss America 1961).
188	22	"The Lady and the Maid"	Richard Kinon	Unknown	March 3, 1984
188	22	"The Babymakers"	Richard Kinon	Unknown	March 3, 1984
188	22	"Love Is Blind"	Richard Kinon	Unknown	March 3, 1984
A ship's maid (Luise Rainer) has resented her twin sister for decades; Barry (Kin Shriner) and Sheila (Jenilee Harrison) take a scientific approach to conception; Isaac and blind Darnell (LeVar Burton) compete for Terry Cook (Shari Belafonte). Guest Stars: Don Ameche
189	23	"Side by Side"	Richard Kinon	Mike Marmer	March 10, 1984
189	23	"A Fish Out of Water"	Richard Kinon	Mike Marmer	March 10, 1984
189	23	"Rub Me Tender"	Richard Kinon	Mike Marmer	March 10, 1984
A teenage boy (Ross Harris) is preoccupied with his Grandma's (Glynis Johns) health. An awkward man (Ed Begley Jr.) meets an unusual woman (Mary Crosby) while snooping. Gopher hires a woman (Mandy Perryment) as a masseuse but doesn't have time to tell Merrill, who falls for her. Guest Stars: Nita Talbot, Leigh Lombardi
190	24	"A Rose Is Not a Rose"	Unknown	Unknown	March 17, 1984
190	24	"Novelties"	Unknown	Unknown	March 17, 1984
190	24	"Too Rich and Too Thin"	Unknown	Unknown	March 17, 1984
A man impersonating a female singer gets double trouble when a passenger falls for the singer and Julie falls for him; a novelty salesman has difficulty separating business from pleasure. Guest Stars: Don Adams, Jaime Lyn Bauer, Arte Johnson, Rich Little, and Audrey Meadows.
191 192	25 26	"Dreamboat"	Robert Scheerer	Unknown	May 5, 1984
191 192	25 26	"Gopher, Isaac & the Starlet"	Robert Scheerer	Unknown	May 5, 1984
191 192	25 26	"The Parents"	Robert Scheerer	Unknown	May 5, 1984
191 192	25 26	"The Importance of Being Johnny"	Robert Scheerer	Unknown	May 5, 1984
191 192	25 26	"Julie and the Producer"	Robert Scheerer	Unknown	May 5, 1984
A Hollywood movie company is filming a musical called Dream Boat on board the ship with plans to use both crew and passengers as extras. Starlet Shelley Rush (Melba Moore) desperately wants to audition for the production crew but can't seem to get their attention. Merrill falls for faded star Angela Lovett (Alexis Smith), while Vicki is enamored of Johnny Lovett (Jimmy Osmond), a rock star who has never acted before, is very apprehensive about his debut, and takes it out on Vicki by being rude to her. Producer Marty Chenault (Dean Jones) is the older brother of Jack Chenault, whom Julie almost married once. Also guest starring: Ben Vereen, David L. Lander, Juliet Prowse
193	27	"Best Ex-Friends"	Ted Lange	Unknown	May 12, 1984
193	27	"All the Congressman's Women"	Ted Lange	Unknown	May 12, 1984
193	27	"Three Faces of Love"	Ted Lange	Unknown	May 12, 1984
Isaac is taken with the new barmaid (Eugenia Wright), but it gets complicated when Gopher tells him to fire her. A movie makeup man (Sal Viscuso) tests his fiancée's (Heidi Bohay) fidelity. Meanwhile, a congressman (Sam Groom) brings his daughter (Tori Spelling) aboard the Pacific Princess after receiving letters threatening her young life, which comes between him and his fiancée (Phyllis Davis). Guest Stars: Heidi Bohay as Suzy Rand, Phyllis Davis as Gayle Ludwig, Sam Groom as Congressman Blake Gibson, Tori Spelling as Penny Gibson, Sal Viscuso as Wendell Shamer, and Eugenia Wright as Tina Burrell. Other Guests: Fred Leaf as Burt Reynolds look-alike. Note: This was the final appearance of Lauren Tewes as she was fired before filming commenced for Season 8.

=== Season 8 (1984–85) ===
No. overall	No. in season	Title	Directed by	Written by	Original release date
194	1	"Doc's Slump (Alaska Cruise)"	Richard Kinon	Unknown	September 22, 1984
194	1	"What a Drag"	Richard Kinon	Unknown	September 22, 1984
194	1	"The Crew's Cruise Director"	Richard Kinon	Unknown	September 22, 1984
The crew is working a special Alaskan cruise: All the passengers are women who are vying for a date with Engelbert Humperdinck.; Because Julie has married, the crew has a new cruise director, the terrorizing Bernice (Diane Ladd). Meanwhile, Julie's recently divorced sister Judy (Pat Klous) is aboard.; Harry (Bert Convy) fears he's inadequate for wife Jane (Patty Duke), the cruise's organizer. He and his friend Ralph (Arte Johnson) pose as women to follow Jane.; Doc's romance with Emily (Michelle Phillips) crumbles.; Also Guest Starring: Lydia Cornell as Bonnie, Rebecca Holden as Diane, Selma Archerd as Mrs. Carter, Anulka Dziubinska as Ginger, and Linda Stayer as Angie. Notes: This is a 90-minute episode. Patty Duke is credited as Patty Duke Astin. Pat Klous is credited as Patricia Klous. Julie (Lauren Tewes) has now left the series. Klous joins the cast, as does Ted McGinley as "Your Ship's Photographer," Ashley "Ace" Covington Evans.
195 196	2 3	"Vicki and the Fugitive"	Unknown	Unknown	September 29, 1984
195 196	2 3	"Lady in the Window"	Unknown	Unknown	September 29, 1984
195 196	2 3	"Stolen Years"	Unknown	Unknown	September 29, 1984
195 196	2 3	"Dutch Treat"	Unknown	Unknown	September 29, 1984
The crew works a Netherlands voyage: Vicki hooks up with a new crew member (Patrick Cassidy) who is being sought by Interpol.; Milton (Pat Harrington Jr.), traveling with his wife Helen (Eileen Brennan), discovers his mistress Tracy (Teri Copley) is also on the ship.; The Captain is taken with Inga, (Elke Sommer) who, for some reason, tries to keep him at bay.; Lisa (Cloris Leachman) meets a former lover, Erik (George Kennedy), who thinks she betrayed him. He doesn't remember her when they meet.; The Netherlands voyage concludes with heartbreak for Vicki. Also Guest Starring: Tim Robbins as young Erik.
197	4	"Ace Meets the Champ"	Unknown	Unknown	October 6, 1984
197	4	"Why Justin Can't Read"	Unknown	Unknown	October 6, 1984
197	4	"Call Me a Doctor"	Unknown	Unknown	October 6, 1984
Ace tries to impress an old girlfriend (Jennifer Holmes) by boxing the heavyweight champion (Dick Butkus). A father (James Noble) refuses to believe his son (Dick Billingsley) may be dyslexic, which the son's tutor (Jeannie Wilson) believes he may be. An overbearing mother (Doris Roberts) tells lies about her daughter (Tovah Feldshuh) to a fellow passenger (Louis Giambalvo).
198	5	"Only the Good Die Young"	Unknown	Unknown	October 13, 1984
198	5	"Honey Beats the Odds"	Unknown	Unknown	October 13, 1984
198	5	"The Light of Another Day"	Unknown	Unknown	October 13, 1984
An undercover FBI agent (Jack Riley) butters up a bookie (James Sloyan)'s girlfriend (Stephanie Faracy) to get the scoop on his operation. Believing that good people die young, a charming boy (Emmanuel Lewis) goes on a rampage of bad behavior. A blind passenger (Barbara Parkins) reunites with a passenger (John Bennett Perry), with whom she went to college and had a crush on. Also Guest Starring: Vernee Watson-Johnson as Lydia Somers. Note: Faracy's character is an apparent imitation of Judy Holliday in the 1950 film Born Yesterday, and the plot of the "Honey Beats the Odds" story strongly parallels that of the film.
199	6	"Soap Gets in Your Eyes"	Unknown	Unknown	October 20, 1984
199	6	"A Match Made in Heaven"	Unknown	Unknown	October 20, 1984
199	6	"Tugs of the Heart"	Unknown	Unknown	October 20, 1984
A dead man (Bill Macy) must perform a selfless act to get into heaven, with an angel (Fritz Weaver) watching. Gopher is leery of a girl (Dianne Kay) who rejected his marriage proposal years ago. A soap opera fan (Jayne Meadows) confuses an actor (Charles Frank) for the villainous character he plays when he and her daughter (Susan Blanchard) get together. Also Guest Starring: Juliet Mills as Blair Chapman; Nedra Volz as a passenger.
200	7	"And One to Grow On"	Unknown	Unknown	October 27, 1984
200	7	"Seems Like Old Times"	Unknown	Unknown	October 27, 1984
200	7	"I'll Never Forget What's Her Name"	Unknown	Unknown	October 27, 1984
Vicki has too much champagne on her 18th birthday, before learning of her father's history of alcoholism. Arthur (Richard Kline) tries to renew a relationship with his former fiancée Rose (Morgan Brittany) by pretending to have amnesia. Using information provided by a private detective (Alex Rocco), Deborah (Joan Van Ark) tracks down her college boyfriend Larry (Robert Reed).
201	8	"Aerobic April"	Unknown	Unknown	November 3, 1984
201	8	"The Wager"	Unknown	Unknown	November 3, 1984
201	8	"Story of the Century"	Unknown	Unknown	November 3, 1984
April Lopez (Charo) comes aboard as the ship's new aerobics instructor. Rich brothers (Ben Murphy and Charles Siebert) bet $1 million that they will not fall in love on the cruise. A reporter (Ralph Bellamy) pursues a woman (Dorothy McGuire) to get the story that she is aviator Amelia Earhart. Also Guest Starring Gordon Jump as Nathan Wills, Mary Kate McGeehan as Anne Loring.
202	9	"The Last Heist"	Unknown	Unknown	November 10, 1984
202	9	"Starting Over"	Unknown	Unknown	November 10, 1984
202	9	"Watching the Master"	Unknown	Unknown	November 10, 1984
Judy's friend Beth (Deborah Adair) can't trust men after the rape and subsequent divorce until she meets fellow passenger Joe (Brodie Greer). Paula (Julia Duffy) wants her jewel-thief uncle David (Patrick Macnee) to retire, but he's after a diamond necklace belonging to Martha (Abby Dalton). Meanwhile, Paula falls for Andy (Douglas Barr). Hal (William Christopher), engaged to Doc's ex-wife Samantha, studies his every move as inspiration to be a perfect husband. This puts a crimp in Doc's fling with Gloria (Delta Burke).
203	10	"By Hook or by Crook"	Unknown	Unknown	November 17, 1984
203	10	"Revenge with Proper Stranger"	Unknown	Unknown	November 17, 1984
203	10	"Don't Get Mad, Get Even"	Unknown	Unknown	November 17, 1984
Depressed on what would have been her wedding anniversary, Judy falls for soft-spoken Mike Morell (Patrick Wayne), which worries Gopher, who harbors a gut feeling that Morell is not to be trusted. Doc's first patient Missy (Heidi Bohay) plans to have an affair and even the score with her loving husband Jack (William R. Moses), who had an accidental affair a few months earlier. Missy chooses Lester Erwin (Ken Kercheval), a loser who fancies himself a ladies' man. Consumer advocate Marvin Cooperman (Ray Buktenica) keeps taking his work home with him but balks when his wife Carol (Jan Smithers) considers taking a job with her former sorority sister Ellen Brown (Devon Ericson), a baked goods manufacturer who makes Marvin's favorite brownies.
204 205	11 12	"My Mother, My Chaperone"	Unknown	Unknown	November 24, 1984
204 205	11 12	"The Present"	Unknown	Unknown	November 24, 1984
204 205	11 12	"The Death and Life of Sir Alfred Demerest"	Unknown	Unknown	November 24, 1984
204 205	11 12	"Welcome Aboard"	Unknown	Unknown	November 24, 1984
The crew journeys to London and Paris: Novelist Lilly Marlowe (Lilli Palmer) keeps a tight rein on her daughter Samantha (Ana Alicia), who is attracted to fellow passenger Roger (Morgan Stevens).; Judy's ex-husband John (Marc Singer) tries to win her back.; Kathy (Loretta Swit) pays an English tart (Catherine Oxenberg) to test her husband Leonard (Dennis Holahan)'s fidelity.; Maud (Colleen Dewhurst) and her son Byron (Peter Barton) are reunited with her actor husband, Sir Alfred (Trevor Howard).; The London and Paris cruise concludes.
206	13	"Paying the Piper"	Unknown	Unknown	December 1, 1984
206	13	"Baby Sister"	Unknown	Unknown	December 1, 1984
206	13	"Help Wanted"	Unknown	Unknown	December 1, 1984
After twenty-three years of marriage, Shirley Enicker (Rue McClanahan) wants to live comfortably, rather than continue to be a penny pincher. Her frugal and cheap husband Howard (Donald O'Connor) doesn't like the changes that are in store for their marriage. Eve Springer (Vera Miles) is on board with her two daughters, Eleanor (Jaime Lyn Bauer) and Patty (Dana Plato). Eleanor doesn't like fast romances because she got burned once years ago, claiming it ruined her life. Eleanor overprotects Patty, trying to throw cold water on her shipboard fling with Peter Barkan (Christopher Knight). Merrill's friend's niece, Kim Carlisle (Michelle Johnson), is an energetic intern rotating through the different jobs on the ship. Unfortunately, she fails at all of them. Note: Michelle Johnson appears as Kim in a recurring role throughout the season.
207	14	"Country Blues"	Unknown	Unknown	December 8, 1984
207	14	"A Matter of Taste"	Unknown	Unknown	December 8, 1984
207	14	"Frat Brothers Forever"	Unknown	Unknown	December 8, 1984
Country music singer-songwriter Billy Boy Bodine (Matt McCoy) cruises with his manager Cappy (Claude Akins). Cappy tries to come between Billy and adoring admirer Arlene Cort (Leah Ayres) because Billy writes his best music when he's depressed. Shipboard neighbors Simon Ashford (Farley Granger) and Valerie Frasier (Terry Moore) are interior designers engaged in cutthroat competition to win the contract to redecorate the ship, stopping at nothing to sabotage each other. Doc enjoys a visit from his fraternity brother Buzz McLaine (Roy Thinnes), who travels with his cousin Jim Dolan (Michael McGrady). But things are not what they seem.
208	15	"Santa, Santa, Santa"	Unknown	Unknown	December 15, 1984
208	15	"Another Dog Gone Christmas"	Unknown	Unknown	December 15, 1984
208	15	"Noel's Christmas Carol"	Unknown	Unknown	December 15, 1984
On a Christmas cruise, three men (Avery Schreiber, Ray Walston, and Scatman Crothers) are scheduled to play one jolly St. Nick. Vicki gives her dog (Tundra the Wonder Dog) to a lonely comic (Howard Morris). Carol Kelsey (Kim Lankford) asks Ace to pose as her fiancé and fool her mother (Anne Francis). Ace's friend Noel Kane (Shea Farrell) complicates things by falling for Carol. Judy, Gopher, and Isaac each hire a Santa, who don't get along and try to outdo each other. To placate her mother, a woman asks Ace to pose as her fiancé. A has-been comic finds his career resurrected by an abandoned dog. ‘’Guest Stars:’’ Scatman Crothers as Malcolm, Shea Farrell as Noel Kane, Anne Francis as Mrs. Kelsey (credited as Anne Lloyd Francis), Michelle Johnson as Kim Carlisle, Kim Lankford as Carol Kelsey, Howard Morris as Billy Banks, Avery Schreiber as Patrick Turney, Tundra the Wonder Dog as Tundra (as Tundra), and Ray Walston as Max Phelps. ‘’Other Guests:’’ Justin Gocke as Mark, Cherilyn Milton as Mark's mother (credited as Mother), and Hector Hernandez as Steward. ‘’Others:’’ Stephen Shortridge (uncredited).
209	16	"Instinct"	Unknown	Unknown	January 5, 1985
209	16	"Unmade for Each Other"	Unknown	Unknown	January 5, 1985
209	16	"BOS"	Unknown	Unknown	January 5, 1985
Shelley (Vic Tayback) and Leslie (Conrad Bain) are on a cruise to meet their matches chosen by a computer dating service. Discovering they were matched with each other, both meet Joan (Janet Leigh) and both pursue her. Isaac pretends to accept Lynda's (Berlinda Tolbert)'s self-help philosophy. Emelyne (Irlene Mandrell), who was supposed to travel with her boyfriend, discovers he's not coming and sent Neil (Bruce Penhall) to keep her company. Neil says her boyfriend is with her best friend, but she learns he's not being completely honest with her.
210	17	"Ace Takes the Test"	Unknown	Unknown	January 12, 1985
210	17	"The Counterfeit Couple"	Unknown	Unknown	January 12, 1985
210	17	"The Odd Triple"	Unknown	Unknown	January 12, 1985
Donna and Gus Braddock (Teresa Ganzel and Christopher Mayer) want Ace to father their child. Strangers Barbara and Lyle (Erin Moran and Richard Gilliland) pose as newlyweds after a mix-up puts them in the honeymoon suite. Annette (Mary Ann Mobley) competes with her daughter, Susie (Crystal Bernard) for Gopher's company.
211	18	"Love on the Line"	Unknown	Unknown	January 26, 1985
211	18	"Don't Call Me Gopher"	Unknown	Unknown	January 26, 1985
211	18	"Her Honor, the Mayor"	Unknown	Unknown	January 26, 1985
Corporate bigwig and workaholic John Stockton (Cesar Romero) meets charming but slightly evasive Marcy Banes (Jane Wyatt), not realizing she is the switchboard operator in his office building. Big-time advertising executive Janet Thompson (Katherine Moffat) reunites with her friend Gopher, whose adamant insistence that people call him Burl winds up alienating all his friends in the process. Newly elected mayor Frances Hardy (Shelley Fabares) is on the cruise with her campaign manager Barry Singer (David Hedison), but falls for Phil Haines (Robert Fuller), the city council president whom she beat for the elected office.
212 213	19 20	"Girl of the Midnight Sun"	Robert Scheerer	Ray Jessel & Cynthia Thompson	February 2, 1985
212 213	19 20	"There'll Be Some Changes Made"	Robert Scheerer	Donald Ross	February 2, 1985
212 213	19 20	"Mr. Smith Goes to Stockholm"	Robert Scheerer	Story by : Sid Morse; Teleplay by : Mike Marmer	February 2, 1985
212 213	19 20	"Too Many Isaacs"	Robert Scheerer	Richard Goldman	February 2, 1985
A Scandinavian cruise on the Royal Viking Sky begins in London and travels through Oslo and Stockholm: Grant Cooper (John Davidson), vice president of promotions for a suntan lotion, seeks a native Scandinavian female from dozens of applicants to be the company spokesperson. Greta Lund (Christopher Norris) impersonates a native Scandinavian in hopes of winning.; Lonely Mel Davis (Jack Klugman) thinks women don't like him because of his large nose. Planning to get cosmetic surgery in Stockholm, he meets Kay Webber (Susannah York). She falls in love with him but thinks he's planning a different kind of surgery.; Scientist Dr. Fabian Cain (Telly Savalas) creates a robot duplicate of Isaac and plans to use him for nefarious purposes. He's helped by aspiring actress Delia Parks (Janet Jackson), who may or may not be in love with Isaac.; Wealthy Swedish actress Helga Bjorsson (Priscilla Barnes) captivates Gopher.; Grant and Ace go to Greta's parent's home for a photo shoot with her.; Kay expresses concern to Doc about Mel's operation.; Dr. Cain tries out Isaac's robot double in public, while the real Isaac goes on a romantic boat ride with Delia.; Gopher leaves the cruise line to work with Helga.
214	21	"Ace Takes a Holiday"	Unknown	Unknown	February 9, 1985
214	21	"The Runaway"	Unknown	Unknown	February 9, 1985
214	21	"The Courier"	Unknown	Unknown	February 9, 1985
A courier (Michael Spound) refuses to remove the briefcase handcuffed to his wrist but still pursues a fellow passenger (Charlene Tilton). Irene (Florence Henderson) can't understand her daughter's (Tracy Nelson)'s hostility toward her stepfather (Peter Mark Richman). Ace is temporarily sidelined with an injured foot, replaced by Kim, and nursed to health by passenger Lisa (Marla Heasley).
215	22	"Getting Started"	Unknown	Unknown	February 16, 1985
215	22	"Daughter's Dilemma"	Unknown	Unknown	February 16, 1985
215	22	"The Captain Wears Pantyhose"	Unknown	Unknown	February 16, 1985
The Captain fails Officer Deirdre Crichton (Cathy Lee Crosby) when she tests for a captaincy. Paul (Jimmy Osmond) is convinced that his father's surprise birthday present is a prostitute (Karen Kopins). Nancy (Tracy Reed) has a dislike for her father (Bernie Hamilton)'s on-board romance (Esther Rolle). Also Guest Starring: Glenn Scarpelli as Boomer; James A. Watson Jr. as James.
216	23	"Vicki's Gentleman Caller"	Unknown	Unknown	February 23, 1985
216	23	"Partners to the End"	Unknown	Unknown	February 23, 1985
216	23	"The Perfect Arrangement"	Unknown	Unknown	February 23, 1985
Captain Stubing isn't pleased when Marc Silverton (James MacArthur), an older man, charms Vicki. Business partners Lou Tangle (James Coco) and Stan Garner (David Doyle) have borrowed money from loan sharks to meet their company's payroll. Their plan to have Lou fake his death so they can collect the insurance money and pay back the sharks is complicated when fellow passenger Harriet Wolters (Ruta Lee) seems attracted to Lou. Bicoastal television personalities Jennifer Kearn (Cristina Raines) and Tom Whitlaw (Richard Hatch) have been married for six months but have spent little time together until their cruise.
217	24	"Judy Hits a Low Note"	Unknown	Unknown	March 23, 1985
217	24	"Love Times Two"	Unknown	Unknown	March 23, 1985
217	24	"The Problem with Papa"	Unknown	Unknown	March 23, 1985
Without an audition, producer Phil (James Houghton) hires Judy to sing in a commercial. Roger (Barry Van Dyke) is drawn to his wife Terry (Ellen Bry)'s best friend Courtney (Judy Landers). Louise (Jessica Walter) fears her father (John McIntire) is senile.
218	25	"Charmed, I'm Sure"	Unknown	Unknown	March 30, 1985
218	25	"Ashes to Ashes"	Unknown	Unknown	March 30, 1985
218	25	"No Dad of Mine"	Unknown	Unknown	March 30, 1985
Ace reunites with an old girlfriend (Morgan Brittany) who is now in a wheelchair. A couple (Jimmie Walker and Telma Hopkins) take advantage of the cruise to quit smoking. A man and woman (John Beck and Cathy Silvers) hide that they are relatives.
219 220	26 27	"Caribbean Cruise: Call Me Grandma"	Unknown	Unknown	May 4, 1985
219 220	26 27	"A Gentleman of Discrimination"	Unknown	Unknown	May 4, 1985
219 220	26 27	"The Perfect Divorce"	Unknown	Unknown	May 4, 1985
219 220	26 27	"Letting Go"	Unknown	Unknown	May 4, 1985
The crew works a Caribbean voyage: A British ex-military officer (Stewart Granger), escorting singing sensations Menudo, is tired of a woman (Lana Turner) who lies.; Jim and Dianne Tipton (Jared Martin and Hayley Mills) are bewildered by Doc and his visiting ex-wife Nancy (Elizabeth Ashley) being very much in love, especially since Doc attributes it to why they divorced.; Vicki falls for Curtis (Timothy Patrick Murphy), who is continually pampered by a mother (Anne Baxter) who refuses to see him as anything other than a child.; Larry (Andrew Stevens) is being set up for a sex-discrimination lawsuit by Anne (Linda Purl), who is disguised as a man.; Elizabeth falls for Thomas.; Anne continues to pose as a man while on the ship.; Jim and Dianne reconsider their relationship.; Curtis proposes to Vicki.; Note: This is Michelle Johnson's last episode as Kim and the final episode and season to use the Jack Jones version of the love boat theme song thats has been on the show since season 1 was removed from the show on season 9 and was replaced by the Dionne Warwick version of the love boat theme song.

=== Season 9 (1985–86) ===
No. overall	No. in season	Title	Directed by	Written by	Original release date
221	1	"A Day in Port"	Kim Friedman	Paula A. Roth	September 28, 1985
The ship receives a makeover while in port. Isaac gets a surprising visit from a former girlfriend Phylicia Ayers-Allen, who is the choreographer of the Love Boat Mermaids. Gopher plays mediator between feuding stewards and laundry-room personnel. Doc keeps Gopher's girlfriend busy. Judy falls for a wealthy man with a dark secret. The Love Boat Mermaids are Debbie Bartlett as Susie, Tori Brenno as Maria, Nanci L. Hammond as Jane, Teri Hatcher as Amy, Debra Johnson as Patti, Macarena as Sheila, Andrea Moenas as Starlight and Beth Myatt as Mary Beth. Guest Stars: Phylicia Ayers-Allen as Lonette Becker, Conrad Bain as Charles Custers, Diane Ladd as Christa Johanson, John Ratzenberger as Marty Elder, Gordon Thomson as Nick Durrell, Ava Cadell as Didi Winters and Steven M. Gagnon as Paul. Note: This episode introduces the Love Boat Mermaids and a revised version of the introductory credits, with rerecorded theme music sung by Dionne Warwick.
222	2	"The Temptations"	Unknown	Unknown	October 5, 1985
222	2	"Joint Custody"	Unknown	Unknown	October 5, 1985
222	2	"Your Money or Your Wife"	Unknown	Unknown	October 5, 1985
Vicki is thrilled to let everyone know that she got the famous band the Temptations to perform during the cruise. A couple fights each other to gain custody of their son. The Temptations board with their manager; a loan shark (Vic Tayback) bargains for a date; the captain becomes involved in a kidnapping. Guest Stars: Franklin Cover as Marvin Brown, Penny Fuller as Catherine Gerra, Charlotte Rae as Milly Brown, Robert Reed as Carl Gerra, Michael Spound as Ted Belmond, Connie Stevens as Heidi Lester, Robert Jayne as Brian Gerard (credited as Bobby Jacoby), and Vic Tayback as Jack Hamilton. The Temptations as Themselves – Musical Guests: Melvin Franklin as himself (as the Temptations), Richard Street as himself (as the Temptations), Ron Tyson as himself (as the Temptations), Otis Williams as himself (as the Temptations), and Ali-Ollie Woodson as himself (as the Temptations).
223	3	"Hidden Treasure"	Unknown	Unknown	October 12, 1985
223	3	"Picture from the Past"	Unknown	Unknown	October 12, 1985
223	3	"Ace's Salary"	Unknown	Unknown	October 12, 1985
A couple is looking for a rare stamp hidden somewhere on the boat. Ace and the crew campaign for a salary raise. A woman avoids Andy Warhol, wanting to forget the time she was in one of his movies. Guest Stars: Milton Berle as Lionel Cooper, Tom Bosley as George Hammond, Peter Duchin as Peter Duchin, Andy Griffith as Larry Cooper, Cloris Leachman as Karen Cooper, Marion Ross as Mary Hammond, Raymond St. Jacques as Ramon, and Andy Warhol as Andy Warhol. Other Guests: Lisa Dean Ryan as Spock and Vera Perez as B.F.D. Marion Ross and Tom Bosley played husband and wife on the hit ABC show Happy Days In 1997, TV Guide ranked this episode #82 on its list of the 100 Greatest Episodes.
224 225	4 5	"German Cruise: The Villa"	Richard Kinon	Michael L. Grace	November 2, 1985
224 225	4 5	"The Racer's Edge"	Richard Kinon	Jill Baer	November 2, 1985
224 225	4 5	"Love or Money"	Richard Kinon	Mike Marmer	November 2, 1985
224 225	4 5	"The Accident"	Richard Kinon	Art Baer & Ben Joelson	November 2, 1985
German Cruise: Part 1 of 2. The crew is now in Germany and among the passengers is a woman (Alexis Smith), whose family estate was taken by a nemesis (Craig Stevens), who runs into an old flame (Mel Ferrer). Doc meets a woman (Susan Blakely), who's traveling with her brother (Ken Olandt), who doesn't warm up to Doc. Later, while they're out, Doc hits a man (Olandt) who appears to be seriously injured. Two sisters (Audrey Landers and Judy Landers), are looking to score a rich guy but, when one of them is attracted to Ace, the other tries to sabotage the relationship. And a biker (Jack Coleman), who just got married (Lisa Whelchel) and is retiring from competition, is being courted by his coach (Harry Morgan), who says he wants him to enter one last race so that the coach can get the job he's trying to get. On the Rivera: a former bike-racing coach (Harry Morgan) tries to lure a newlywed champion (Jack Coleman) out of retirement; a woman (Alexis Smith) wants to visit the family villa before it's sold; Doc feels bad about a young man (Ken Olandt)'s death; two sisters (Audrey Landers and Judy Landers) try to attract wealthy men. Guest Stars: Susan Blakely as Nicole Phillips, Jack Coleman as Scott Barrett, Mel Ferrer as Jack Powers, Audrey Landers as Brenda Adams-Rosenberg, Judy Landers as Edie Adams-Rosenberg, Harry Morgan as Charly Fields, Ken Olandt as Don Phillips, Alexis Smith as Justina Downey, Craig Stevens as Viktor Lukas, and Lisa Whelchel as Kelly Barrett. Other Guests: Patti MacLeod as Society Matron (credit only), Richard Wren as Carl Mueller, William Jackson as Alexander Dietrich (credited as William B. Jackson), Peter Kelly as Marcel Villemin, Barbara Ward as Gina, Charles Howard as man at Bar, Sisse Hasbo as Sophia, Ulrich Matschoss as Anton, and Gil Mandelik as Croupier (credit only). Note: The Love Boat Mermaids did not appear.
226	6	"Forties Fantasy"	Unknown	Unknown	November 16, 1985
Gopher envisions the liner as a World War II troop ship en route to France. Guest Stars: Charo as Lupe Zapata De Vega Valdez, Nathan Cook as Carl Tysdell, Leigh McCloskey as Charles "Chip" Reynolds, Stephanie Mills as Tara, and Erin Moran as Janet Reynolds. Other Guests: John Zarchen as Martin and Michael Pniewski as Stefanowicz.
227	7	"Good Time Girls"	Unknown	Unknown	November 23, 1985
227	7	"The Iron Man"	Unknown	Unknown	November 23, 1985
227	7	"Soap Star"	Unknown	Unknown	November 23, 1985
Three college girls (Carrell Myers, Toni Hudson, and Christie Claridge) are mistaken for prostitutes; fitness expert and health book author Andy (Charles Frank) suffers fainting spells during triathlon training and Doc tells him he has diabetes; Judy (Pat Klous) soap opera star aunt Sylvia's (Carol Channing) jealous friend Betsy (Betty White) auditions for a new part on their soap opera with Sylvia's lecherous co-star Roger (Louis Nye). Judy's soap-star aunt boards; a health-book author finds out what ails him; three women court Ace. Guest Stars: Carol Channing as Sylvia Bennett, Charles Frank as Andy Singer, Belinda Montgomery as Valerie Singer, Louis Nye as Roger Garrett, and Betty White as Betsy Boucher. Other Guests: Carrell Myers as Denise, Toni Hudson as Rita, Christie Claridge as Sherry, Don Bovingloh as Howard, Joe Renteria as Ramon, Rose Parrah as Chi Chi, and Anthony Barton as Dean.
228	8	"Trouble in Paradise"	Unknown	Unknown	November 30, 1985
228	8	"No More Mister Nice Guy"	Unknown	Unknown	November 30, 1985
228	8	"The Mermaid and the Cop"	Unknown	Unknown	November 30, 1985
Julie McCoy asks Gopher for advice when her marriage starts to fall apart. Amy (Teri Hatcher), one of the Mermaid dancers, believes she was involved in a crime and is afraid that a Las Vegas cop who is being friendly to her might recognize her. Ace is forced to fire two employees. Julie McCoy Chenault (Lauren Tewes) comes back; Ace must prove himself by firing two employees; A police detective woos mermaid Amy. Guest Stars: Pamela Brull as Linda Hershel, Richard Hatch as Ryan Curly, Lauren Tewes as Julie McCoy Chenault, and David Wayne as Max Marshall.
229	9	"Roommates"	Unknown	Unknown	December 7, 1985
229	9	"Heartbreaker"	Unknown	Unknown	December 7, 1985
229	9	"Out of the Blue"	Unknown	Unknown	December 7, 1985
New roommates Vicki and Judy have to deal with their opposite habits. A multimillionaire makes everyone's dreams come true. A rich man promises to make wishes come true; Vicki and Judy become roommates; A pro golfer learns the truth about the woman he loves. Guest Stars: Diana Canova as Christine Bradley, Jeff Conaway as Randy Jackson, Sandy Dennis as Gina Caldwell, and Harvey Korman as Cabot Fairfield. Other Guests: Toni Lamond as Mrs. Burton and Warren Munson as Edgar Fairchild.
230	10	"The Father of the Bride"	Unknown	Unknown	January 11, 1986
230	10	"The Best Man"	Unknown	Unknown	January 11, 1986
230	10	"Members of the Wedding"	Unknown	Unknown	January 11, 1986
Love is in the air with a wedding on board. Ace is attracted by the bride that ran away, and the groom is getting closer to her sister. Passengers involved in a shipboard wedding include the nearly bankrupt father of the bride, the best man, and a wedding party-crasher. Guest Stars: Lydia Cornell as Jackie Ryan Proctor, Fannie Flagg as Laurie Ryan, Robert Mandan as Ernie Ryan, Denver Pyle as Eric Springer, and Morgan Stevens as Kurt Duncan. Other Guests: John Scott Clough as Matthew Springer (listed as Matt Springer), Elaine Wilkes as Lori Ryan, Archie Hahn as Eldon Lundy, Lou Richards as Andrew Proctor (listed as Doctor Proctor), and Danny Goldman as George Thurlow.
231	11	"Dare Devil"	Unknown	Unknown	January 18, 1986
231	11	"Picture Me a Spy"	Unknown	Unknown	January 18, 1986
231	11	"Sleeper"	Unknown	Unknown	January 18, 1986
Ace's cabin has been searched and he suspects spy teamwork. Doc's new patient is sleepwalking. A woman is scared by her boyfriend's risky stunts. Ace photographs a spy and his daughter; A girl challenges a daredevil (Peter Scolari); Doc helps a senator (Alan Thicke) and his wife. Guest Stars: Courteney Cox as Carol, Herb Edelman as Dr. Ivan Petrovska (credited as Herbert Edelman), Peter Scolari as Frank Hobbs, Shelley Smith as Phyllis Townsend, Alan Thicke as Senator Bob Townsend, and Kristina Wayborn as Anna Petrovska. Other Guests: Yakov Smirnoff as Dmitri Kostov.
232	12	"Frat Wars"	Unknown	Unknown	January 25, 1986
232	12	"Return of the Lambdas"	Unknown	Unknown	January 25, 1986
232	12	"Hippies and Yuppies"	Unknown	Unknown	January 25, 1986
When a fraternity has the turnover of one of their relics from one chapter to another, the chapter receiving the relic feels the chapter currently in possession of it is not worthy to be part of the fraternity, so the recipient chapter leader (Tim Ryan) tries to make it appear that they violated several of the fraternity's laws so that they would be thrown out. He even sends a girl (Karen L. Scott) to seduce and distract the leader (Steven Eckholdt) of the other group, who seems to keep them in check. And two couples, who were also in the fraternity 20 years ago and were hippies then, meet and while one of them (Larry Wilcox and Carlene Watkins) is still hippie, the other one is now more yuppie (Melanie Chartoff and James Houghton), so they feel as if they don't have anything in common anymore. Rival fraternities vie to impress the head of their national alumni association; Old college pals find they have different lifestyles. Guest Stars: Melanie Chartoff as Betty Bell, James Houghton as Buddy Bell, Gordon Jump as Grant Woodrow, Carlene Watkins as Rebecca Davis, and Larry Wilcox as Larry Davis. Other Guests: Steven Eckholdt as Eric Matthews, Karen L. Scott as Connie Disch, Tim Ryan as Nolan Dickford (aka Timothy Ryan Meinelschmidt), Robbie Rist as Zit, Stephen Lee as Hockstein, Claud Mann as Carnegie, and Daniel Roebuck as S. C. U. Lambda.
233	13	"Miss Mom"	Unknown	Unknown	February 1, 1986
233	13	"Who's the Champ"	Unknown	Unknown	February 1, 1986
233	13	"Gopher's Delusion"	Unknown	Unknown	February 1, 1986
Judy thinks a writer (Ben Murphy) of children's books is perfect for her picky cousin (Ellen Bry), who is also pregnant; A pro wrestler (Tim Rossovich) forbids his sister (Jennifer Holmes) to associate with his opponent (Bruce Jenner); Gopher is accidentally hypnotized and given a post-hypnotic suggestion that he's the captain. Guest Stars: Ellen Bry as Gretchen Sommers, Hulk Hogan as himself, Jennifer Holmes as Linda Sharkey, Caitlyn Jenner as Lover Boy Bob (credited as Bruce Jenner), Ben Murphy as Nathan Paul, and Tim Rossovich as Thomas "The Mangler" Sharkey. Other Guests: Patrick Cronin as Eddie Dumont, Neil Thompson as The Amazing Zimmerman, and Jim Holmes as Camera Man.
234 235	14 15	"Egypt - Part 1"	Unknown	Unknown	February 8, 1986
234 235	14 15	"Egypt - Part 2"	Unknown	Unknown	February 8, 1986
Part 1 of 2. Cruising the Nile – the Captain and his friend's widow (Jean Stapleton) share memories; A producer (John Astin) wants a starlet (Deborah Adair) to play Cleopatra; A woman (Catherine Oxenberg) eyes the gold ankh that Doc was given at a bazaar; A busy man (James Sloyan) may lose his schoolteacher wife (Valerie Harper) to a former student. On the Nile: Stubing meets a widow; Two agents want Doc's souvenir; A couple faces facts; A reporter upsets an actress. Guest Stars: Deborah Adair as Deborah Grant, John Astin as Michael Sawyer, Joseph Campanella as Nabil El Masri, Chad Everett as Wayne Richmond, Valerie Harper as Laurel Peters, Catherine Oxenberg as Carrie Barton, John Putch as Jason Matthews, Grant Show as Christopher Stuart, James Sloyan as Greg Peters and Jean Stapleton as Helen Branigan. Other Guests: René Assa as Ahmed and Ken Lewis as Steward. Note: The Love Boat Mermaids did not appear.
236	16	"Hello, Emily"	Unknown	Unknown	February 15, 1986
236	16	"The Tour Guide"	Unknown	Unknown	February 15, 1986
236	16	"The Winning Number"	Unknown	Unknown	February 15, 1986
A widow (Marion Ross) has her eyes on the Captain. A freshly appointed tour guide (Teri Copley) has to deal with a group of demanding senior citizens. A recent lottery winner (Noah Beery Jr.) becomes greedy. A wealthy businesswoman (Marion Ross) flirts with Stubing; A tour guide loses her group; An $ 8 million lottery winner becomes a boor. Guest Stars: Noah Beery Jr. as Daryl Wilcox, Teri Copley as Donna Louise Bedford, Virginia Mayo as Virginia Wilcox, Marion Ross as Emily Haywood and Barry Van Dyke as Brandon Cobb. Other Guests: Martin Hewitt as Kirby Haywood, Isabelle Walker as Karen Haywood, Iris Adrian as Emma Baxter, and Helen Kleeb as Mildred Wiley.
237	17	"The Second Time Around"	Unknown	Unknown	February 22, 1986
237	17	"Hello, Spencer"	Unknown	Unknown	February 22, 1986
237	17	"Runaway, Go Home"	Unknown	Unknown	February 22, 1986
The Captain welcomes back a widow (Marion Ross), who has romantic plans for her new cruise. Larry Gatlin is trying to help a runaway (Quinn Cummings). Stubing proposes to Emily (Marion Ross); A teenage stowaway who meets Larry Gatlin and the Gatlin Brothers; A phony agent who dupes a comedian. Guest Stars: Quinn Cummings as Anny, Larry Gatlin and The Gatlin Brothers as Themselves – Musical Guests (credited as The Gatlin Brothers), Marion Ross as Emily Haywood, Michael Winslow as Spencer Wilson, Larry Gatlin as himself, and Steve Gatlin and Rudy Gatlin as themselves.
238	18	"Couples"	Unknown	Unknown	March 1, 1986
238	18	"The Art Lover"	Unknown	Unknown	March 1, 1986
238	18	"Made for Each Other"	Unknown	Unknown	March 1, 1986
Gopher is afraid of getting fired, after breaking a very valuable art piece. Newlyweds (Mary Cadorette and Dean Butler) realize that they have nothing in common besides sex. Gopher breaks a passenger's (Jose Ferrer) priceless statue; Judy is labeled a home-wrecker; Ace snaps a telling shot of two couples. Guest Stars: Dean Butler as Brent Harper, Mary Cadorette as Darlene Harper, José Ferrer as Simon Beck, Caren Kaye as Paula Mercer, Vicki Lawrence as Betty Logan, David Spielberg as Marc Mercer, Alana Stewart as Miss Enty and Fred Willard as Nil Logan. Other Guests: Bert Rosario as Julio.
239	19	"Second Banana"	Unknown	Unknown	March 8, 1986
239	19	"The Prodigy"	Unknown	Unknown	March 8, 1986
239	19	"What Goes Around Comes Around"	Unknown	Unknown	March 8, 1986
An artist (Donald O'Connor) and his orangutan give their last performance during the cruise. Doc falls for a radio psychologist; A gambler (Thomas Bray) risks love; A woman wants to retire her spouse's (Donald O'Connor) orangutan. Guest Stars: Thom Bray as Lowell Mandell, CJ the Orangutan as Tanny the Orangutan, Patti Davis as Brenda (credited as Patricia Davis), Gloria DeHaven as Mary Halbert, Nancy Dussault as Dr. Dorothee Davis, and Donald O'Connor as Leo Halbert. Other Guests: Vincent Di Paolo as Passenger (uncredited).
240	20	"Gothic Romance"	Unknown	Unknown	March 15, 1986
240	20	"Whatever Happened to Crazy Joe Flash?"	Unknown	Unknown	March 15, 1986
Searching for inspiration, a romance novelist (Morgan Brittany) fantasizes that Ace is courting her; A rock star (Joe Regalbuto) tries to act like a regular guy and finds romance with another passenger (Donna Pescow); A couple (Jayne Meadows and Bill Macy) who regularly take the cruise and have the same cabin, for ten years, are really married to other people and sneaking away for the cruise. A disguised rock star faces rejection; A novelist sees Ace as the hero of her next book; Two lovers celebrate their 10th anniversary. Guest Stars: Jayne Meadows as Janice (credited as Jayne Meadows Allen), Morgan Brittany as Katherine Wilde, Bill Macy as Myles, Donna Pescow as Joyce Anderson, Joe Regalbuto as Herb Hanson / Crazy Joe Flash, and Michael Young as Henry Gordon.
241	21	"The Will"	Unknown	Unknown	March 22, 1986
241	21	"Deja Vu"	Unknown	Unknown	March 22, 1986
241	21	"The Prediction"	Unknown	Unknown	March 22, 1986
A millionaire is after a mysterious woman who turned out to be his wife. A psychic (Eva Gabor) makes a very scary prediction. A psychic predicts doom; A woman and an old beau are reunited by her dead husband's design; A man discovers that he was once married. Guest Stars: Eva Gabor as Leila Kane, Mimi Kuzyk as Nancy Brown, Garrett Morris as Gary Samuels, Roxie Roker as Rhonda Whitney, and Patrick Wayne as Jim Stanton / Ed Brown. Note: Nanci L. Hammond as Jane – Love Boat Mermaid (credited as Nanci Hammond, instead of Nanci Lynn Hammond as in previous episodes).
242 243	22 23	"Spain Cruise: The Matadors"	Unknown	Unknown	May 3, 1986
242 243	22 23	"Mrs. Jameson Comes Out"	Unknown	Unknown	May 3, 1986
242 243	22 23	"Love's Labor Found"	Unknown	Unknown	May 3, 1986
242 243	22 23	"Marry Me, Marry Me"	Unknown	Unknown	May 3, 1986
Spain cruise: The grandson (Lorenzo Lamas) of a famous matador (Cesar Romero) wants to write rather than become a bullfighter; A woman (Sada Thompson), who spent 20 years in prison, hopes to be reunited with her daughter (Melissa Sue Anderson); A passenger (Adrian Zmed) is seeing both Judy and Vicki without their knowledge; Isaac helps a pregnant unmarried stowaway (Olivia Brown). A matador clashes with his grandson; A released convict seeks her daughter; Isaac finds a stowaway; A man woos two women. Note: The crew is on vacation in Genoa, Italy, before returning to work and sailing on the MS Vistafjord around Spain and Portugal. Part 1 includes stops in Barcelona, Ibiza, and Malaga. Part 2 starts in Malaga and includes a stop in Lisbon. Guest Stars: Melissa Sue Anderson as Dana Colton, Olivia Brown as Lois Hendrix, Mary Crosby as Helen Elaine, Lorenzo Lamas as Antonio Belmonte, William R. Moses as Mark Davis, Cesar Romero as Carlos Belmonte, Sada Thompson as Laura Jameson, and Adrian Zmed as Eddy Conrad. Other Guests: Mykelti Williamson as James Russell (credited as Mykel T. Williamson) (credit only), Robin Harlan as Beautiful Girl (credit only), Peter Forbes-Robertson as Doctor (credit only), Denise Gallup as Twin #1 (credit only), and Dian Gallup as Twin #2 (credit only). Note: These five Other Guests are credited in Part 1 and Part 2, but only appear in Part 2. Note: Chiquito de la Calzada appeared as Musician (uncredited) in Part 1 only. Note: The Love Boat Mermaids did not appear.
244	24	"My Stepmother, Myself"	Unknown	Unknown	May 17, 1986
244	24	"Almost Roommates"	Unknown	Unknown	May 17, 1986
244	24	"Cornerback Sneak"	Unknown	Unknown	May 17, 1986
Captain Stubing's happiness is darkened by Vicki's jealousy. The crew learns that they have to share their cabins. Stubing's pending marriage upsets Vicki. A veteran football player faces being cut. A cook (Michael Winslow) has two roommates. Guest Stars: Marion Ross as Emily Heywood, Geoffrey Scott as John Jackson / John 'Hatchet Man' Hatcher, Trish Van Devere as Amanda Dailey (new owner of the San Jose Friars), Vanessa Williams as Pearl, and Michael Winslow as Spencer Wilson (also introduced as Assistant Cruise Director by Gopher in beginning dialogue). Other Guests: Sam Scarber as Bubba Powell. Note: Nanci L. Hammond as Jane – Love Boat Mermaid (credited as Nanci Hammond, instead of Nanci Lynn Hammond as in previous episodes).
245	25	"Happily Ever After"	Unknown	Unknown	May 24, 1986
245	25	"Have I Got a Job for You"	Unknown	Unknown	May 24, 1986
245	25	"Mr. Smith Goes to Minikulu"	Unknown	Unknown	May 24, 1986
The Captain might reconsider his marriage to Emily (Marion Ross). Gopher has second thoughts about an offer to manage an island resort when Isaac leaves the project. Stubing has prenuptial jitters; Ace is prepared to take over as purser if Gopher accepts an offer to manage a tropical resort. Guest Stars: Clive Revill as Slade Collins, Marion Ross as Emily Heywood / Emily Stubing, Renée Taylor as Monica Douglas and Michael Winslow as Spencer Wilson. Other Guests: Jan Peters as Minister. Note: Nanci L. Hammond as Jane – Love Boat Mermaid (credited as Nanci Hammond, instead of Nanci Lynn Hammond as in previous episodes). Note: This was the series finale. Some special episodes followed, and are sometimes referred to as Season 10, but are not usually included in the series syndication re-runs.

=== Specials (1986–90) ===
No. overall	No. in season	Title	Directed by	Written by	Original release date
246	1	"The Shipshape Cruise"	Unknown	Unknown	November 21, 1986
An overweight diet doctor hires a fitness instructor to promote her nutrition program; a man tells his significant other that he wants to see other women; Doc runs into an ex (Stephanie Beacham) while he is on his honeymoon. Ted McGinley is now the ship's yeoman purser, Ashley "Ace" Covington Evans, and Lauren Tewes rejoins the cast as cruise director Julie McCoy. Guest Stars: Marion Ross as Emily Stubing, Stephanie Beacham as Elaine Riskin, Heidi Bohay as Jerry Sullivan Bricker, Cathy Lee Crosby as Carol Darnell, Katherine Helmond as Harriet Darnell Stevens, Jennifer Holliday as Dr. Charlene Thomas, Steve Lundquist as Steve Riskin, Dack Rambo as Boyd Hughes, and Stephanie Williams as Doris Johnson. Other Guests: Julius Harris as Minister, and Lana Clarkson as Angela. Note: Fred Grandy left the show to successfully run for a seat in the United States House of Representatives. Grandy, a Republican representing Iowa's 6th congressional district, went on to serve four consecutive terms (1987–1995). Pat Klous did not appear in this episode.
247	2	"The Christmas Cruise – Part 1"	Unknown	Unknown	December 25, 1986
Part 1 of 2. Mother and daughter cons work a Christmas cruise; depression overcomes a comic portraying Santa; a couple is reunited after 11 years; the new Mrs. Stubing wonders what to get her husband for Christmas. Guest Stars: Marion Ross as Emily Stubing, John Byner as Arthur Burkley, Leslie Caron as Mrs. Duvall, Anthony Franciosa as David Morgan, Jennifer Caron Hall as Heather Duvall, Gina Lollobrigida as Carla Lucci, and Peter Scolari as Wellington Davis Rothmeyer. Other Guests: Judith Barsi as Christmas Angel, Efrain Figueroa as Bartender, Ruben Moreno as Maitre D', Janet Maylie as Maid, Peter Love as Cabin Boy, Cindy Adlesh as Bikini Girl #1, Renee Gentry as Bikini Girl #3, Eva LaRue as Bikini Girl #4, Stacy Lindholm as Bikini Girl #5, Meilani Paul as Bikini Girl #2 (credited as Meilani Figalan), Patty Robinson as Bikini Girl #6 and Lorin Jean Vail as Bikini Girl #7. Others: Bert Parks as Rich Businessman (uncredited).
248	3	"The Christmas Cruise – Part 2"	Unknown	Unknown	December 25, 1986
Conclusion. Heather wonders if Wellington will still love her when he finds out about her; a chance meeting between David and the morose Santa helps them both make a fateful decision; Mrs. Stubing struggles to find a present for Merrill. Guest Stars/Other Guests: Same as Part 1.
249	4	"Who Killed Maxwell Thorn?"	Unknown	Unknown	February 27, 1987
A billionaire who had secretly given free cruises to six strangers is reported missing, and Ace suspects that one of the cruise recipients murdered him; Emily (Marion Ross) searches for fulfillment as someone other than the captain's wife. This episode featured appearances by a large number of actors - nearly all of whom had previously appeared on Love Boat - appearing either as themselves or as characters they made famous on other TV shows. Guest Stars: Marion Ross as Emily Stubing, Lloyd Bochner as George Tillman, Arlene Dahl as Jessica York, Peter Graves as Leonard Culver, Julie Harris as Irene Culver, Jenilee Harrison as Sarah York, Roger E. Mosley as Jeffrey T. Gilbert, John Rubinstein as Allan Davis, Connie Stevens as Margret Grant, Alan Thicke as Robert McBride, Jayne Meadows as herself (credited as Jayne Meadows Allen), Steve Allen as himself, Army Archerd as himself, Selma Archerd as herself, Barbi Benton as herself, Milton Berle as himself, Barbara Billingsley as June Cleaver, Tom Bosley as Howard Pfister, Ruth Buzzi as herself, Carol Channing as Tante Sylvia, Charo as April Lopez, Bert Convy as himself (credited as Bert Convey), Elinor Donahue as Betty Anderson, Tony Dow as Wally Cleaver, Florence Henderson as Carol Brady, Gordon Jump as Maître d, Don Knotts as himself, Judy Landers as herself, Tina Louise as herself, Patti MacLeod as herself, Robert Mandan as himself, Jerry Mathers as Beaver Cleaver, Christopher Norris as herself, Louis Nye as himself, Tom Poston as himself, Juliet Prowse as herself, Robert Reed as Mike Brady, Charles Siebert as Dr. Stanley Riverside, Gale Storm as herself, Vic Tayback as himself, Charlene Tilton as Secretary, Leslie Uggams as herself, Jo Anne Worley as herself, and Jane Wyatt as Margaret Anderson. Others: David Doyle as Repairer #1 and Arte Johnson as Repairer #2.
250	5	"The Love Boat: A Valentine Voyage"	Unknown	Unknown	February 12, 1990
A Valentine's Day episode, centered on a suspended police lieutenant trailing a group of jewel thieves and Captain Stubing and Vicki mourning Emily's sudden death and eventually returning to Barbados (where the Stubings honeymooned) to find closure. Also: The new cruise director sets her eyes on a passenger who is a TV star, but another ship employee is interested in her. Doc has to care for the pregnant wife of the ship's chief executive. Final special featuring the original cast. Guest Stars: Steve Bond as Kirk, Tom Bosley as Lt. Logan, Julia Duffy as Myrna Foley, Roddy Piper as Maurice Steiger, Shanna Reed as Nina Morgan, Joe Regalbuto as Tony Blanchard, Ted Shackelford as Paul Royce, Kim Johnston Ulrich as Kelly

== Home media ==
The following DVD sets were released by CBS Home Entertainment:

DVD set	Episodes	Release date
The Love Boat: Season 1, Volume 1	12	March 4, 2008
The Love Boat: Season 1, Volume 2	12	August 12, 2008
The Love Boat: Season 2, Volume 1	13	January 27, 2009
The Love Boat: Season 2, Volume 2	12	August 4, 2009
The Love Boat: Season 3, Volume 1	14	January 17, 2017
The Love Boat: Season 3, Volume 2	14	January 17, 2017
