= Valentine's Day (2010 film) =

American romantic comedy film by Garry Marshall

- Theatrical release poster
- Directed by: Garry Marshall
- Screenplay by: Katherine Fugate
- Story by: Katherine Fugate; Abby Kohn; Marc Silverstein
- Produced by: Mike Karz; Wayne Allan Rice
- Starring: Jessica Alba; Kathy Bates; Jessica Biel; Bradley Cooper; Eric Dane; Patrick Dempsey; Héctor Elizondo; Jamie Foxx; Jennifer Garner; Topher Grace; Anne Hathaway; Ashton Kutcher; Queen Latifah; Taylor Lautner; George Lopez; Shirley MacLaine; Emma Roberts; Julia Roberts; Taylor Swift
- Cinematography: Charles Minsky
- Edited by: Bruce Green
- Music by: John Debney
- Production companies: New Line Cinema; Wayne Rice Films; Karz Entertainment
- Distributed by: Warner Bros. Pictures
- Release date: February 12, 2010
- Running time: 125 minutes
- Country: United States
- Language: English
- Budget: $52 million
- Box office: $216.5 million

Valentine's Day is a 2010 American romantic comedy film directed by Garry Marshall. The screenplay and the story were written by Katherine Fugate, Abby Kohn, and Marc Silverstein. The film features an ensemble cast led by Jessica Alba, Kathy Bates, Jessica Biel, Bradley Cooper, Eric Dane, Patrick Dempsey, Héctor Elizondo, Jamie Foxx, Jennifer Garner, Topher Grace, Anne Hathaway, Ashton Kutcher, Queen Latifah, Taylor Lautner, George Lopez, Shirley MacLaine, Emma Roberts, Julia Roberts, and Taylor Swift. It tells different love stories that occur on Valentine's Day.

Valentine's Day was released by Warner Bros. Pictures on February 12, 2010. The film received negative reviews, but was a box office success, grossing $216.5 million against a $52 million budget.

== Plot ==
Florist Reed Bennett wakes up and proposes to his girlfriend Morley Clarkson, who accepts. However, Reed's closest friends, Alfonso Rodriguez and Julia Fitzpatrick, are not surprised when Morley suddenly changes her mind and leaves Reed a few hours later.

On a flight to Los Angeles, Kate Hazeltine, a captain in the U.S. Army on a one-day leave, befriends Holden Wilson. She is travelling a long distance to get back home only for a short time, and he states that she must really be in love to do so. When the plane lands and Kate has to wait hours for the taxi, Holden offers his limousine to allow her to be there sooner.

Julia, an elementary school teacher, has fallen in love with cardiothoracic surgeon Dr. Harrison Copeland, but does not know that he is married to Pamela. He tells her that he needs to go to San Francisco for a business trip: on his way, he stops by at Reed's flower shop and orders two flower bouquets - asking for discretion.

Julia books a flight to surprise Harrison on his trip and is stopped by Reed at the gate, where he tells her that Harrison is still married. She decides to not fly to San Francisco, and instead visits Harrison's L.A. hospital, where the staff confirm he is married. Julia finds out where Harrison is dining at a local restaurant, dresses as a waitress and makes a scene at the restaurant, making Harrison's wife Pamela suspicious.

Kate's son Edison, one of Julia's students, orders flowers from Reed, to be sent to his teacher. Julia suggests to Edison to give the flowers to a girl named Rani in his class who has a crush on him after telling him the meaning of love.

Edison's babysitter Grace Smart is planning to lose her virginity to her boyfriend Alex Franklin. The planned encounter goes awry when Grace's mother discovers a naked Alex in Grace's room, rehearsing a song he wrote for Grace.

Edison's maternal grandparents, Edgar and Estelle Paddington are facing the troubles of a long marriage. She confesses to him about an affair she had with one of his business partners long ago. Although Estelle is deeply sorry, Edgar is very upset.

Grace's high school friends, Willy Harrington and Felicia Miller are experiencing the freshness of new love and have agreed to wait to have sex.

Sean Jackson, a closeted gay professional football player, is contemplating the end of his career with his publicist Kara Monahan and his agent Paula Thomas. Kara is organizing her annual "I Hate Valentine's Day" party, but soon becomes interested in sports reporter Kelvin Moore. He was ordered to do a Valentine's Day report by his boss Susan Moralez, but shares Kara's hatred of the holiday.

Substituting for Paula's absent secretary is one of the firm's receptionists, Liz Curran, who dates mailroom clerk Jason Morris. He is shocked to discover she moonlights as a phone sex operator. Liz explains that she is only doing it to pay off a $100,000 student loan. Jason is upset, but eventually reconciles with her after seeing Edgar forgive Estelle.

Sean finally comes out on national television, and Holden, Sean's lover, goes back to him. Kate arrives home late at night to greet not her supposed boyfriend but her son Edison. Willy drops Felicia Miller off at home after a date and they kiss. Kelvin and Kara hang out at his news station where they later kiss. Alfonso dines with his wife, and Grace and Alex agree to wait to have sex. Edgar and Estelle reconcile and redo their marriage vows, Harrison's wife has left him because of his infidelity and Morley tries to call Reed, who is instead starting a new relationship with Julia. Paula receives a call from one of Liz's masochistic clients and takes delight in expressing her dominance and sadism.

== Cast ==
- Jessica Alba as Morley Clarkson
- Kathy Bates as Susan Moralez
- Jessica Biel as Kara Monahan
- Bradley Cooper as Holden Wilson
- Eric Dane as Sean Jackson
- Patrick Dempsey as Dr. Harrison Copeland
- Héctor Elizondo as Edgar Paddington
- Jamie Foxx as Kelvin Moore
- Jennifer Garner as Julia Fitzpatrick
- Topher Grace as Jason Morris
- Anne Hathaway as Liz Curran
- Carter Jenkins as Alex Franklin
- Ashton Kutcher as Reed Bennett
- Queen Latifah as Paula Thomas
- Taylor Lautner as Willy Harrington
- George Lopez as Alfonso Rodriguez
- Shirley MacLaine as Estelle Paddington
- Emma Roberts as Grace Smart
- Julia Roberts as Captain Kate Paddington-Hazeltine
- Bryce Robinson as Edison Hazeltine
- Taylor Swift as Felicia Miller
- Katherine LaNasa as Pamela Copeland
- Megan Suri as Rani

In addition, amongst the plethora of brief cameo appearances, director Garry Marshall plays a violinist (his usual family crew of wife, son, daughter, grandchildren and niece also appear), singer Paul Williams provides opening and closing dialogue as a radio DJ, and ESPN sports journalist Hannah Storm plays herself.

== Music ==
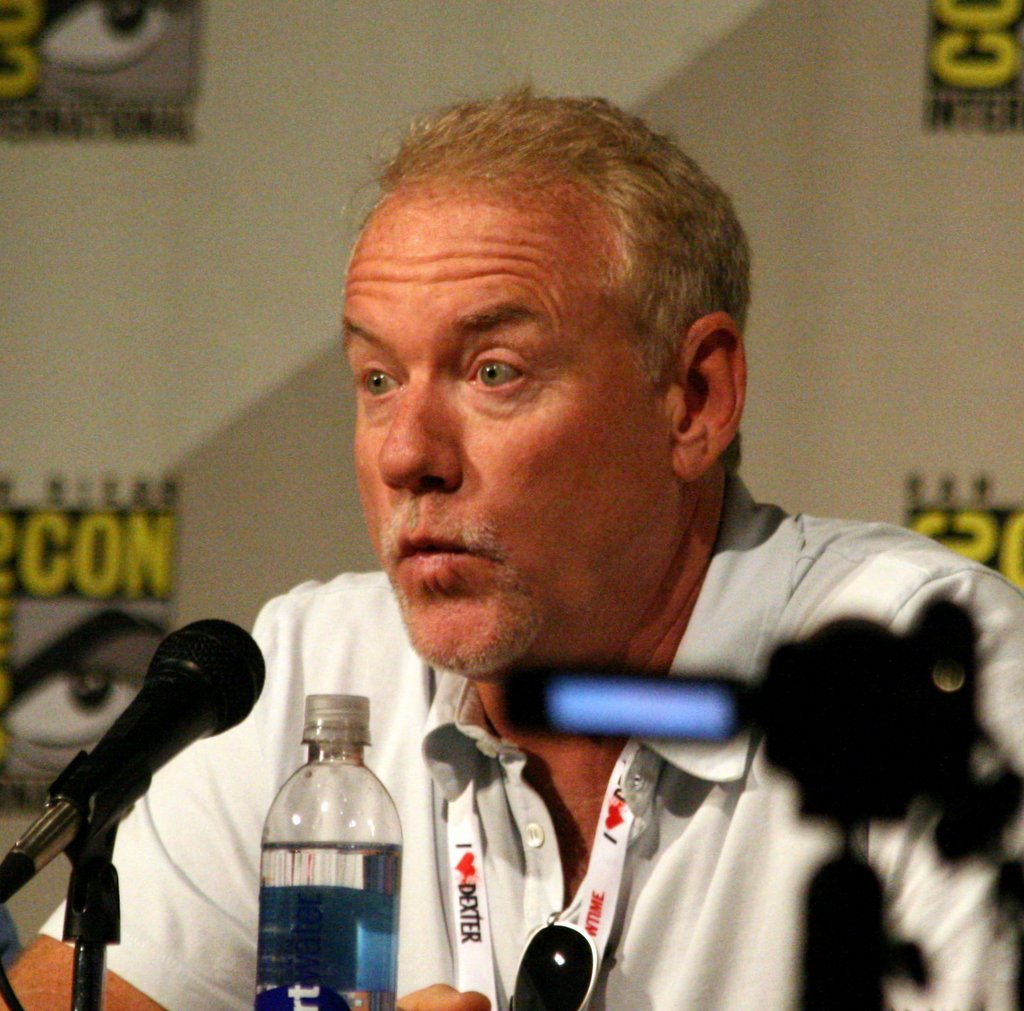
John Debney composed the film's score.

The score to Valentine's Day was composed by John Debney, who recorded his score with the Hollywood Studio Symphony at the Sony Scoring Stage. He also wrote a song for the film, "Every Time You Smiled", with award-winning lyricist Glen Ballard which was performed by Carina Round.

The movie's official soundtrack was released on February 9, 2010, via Big Machine Records. It features the movie's leading song, Jewel's "Stay Here Forever", which was released as a single on January 19, 2010, and has charted on the U.S. Billboard Hot Country Songs chart. The soundtrack also includes "Today Was a Fairytale" by Taylor Swift, which debuted at No. 2 on the U.S. Billboard Hot 100, breaking a record for highest first-week sales by a female artist. Swift's song "Jump Then Fall" from the Platinum edition of her album Fearless was also featured on the soundtrack. Debney's score album, including "Every Time You Smiled" (written by Debney and Glen Ballard, and not included on the song CD), was released digitally on April 7, 2010, by Watertower Music.

Jamie Foxx also recorded a song for the film which is called "Quit Your Job". It appears in the film but not on the soundtrack however, because of its vulgar lyrics. "I Gotta Feeling" by The Black Eyed Peas was used for the film's trailer.

Track listing for the score album:

1. "The Proposal/Trying to Tell Her" – 2:20
2. "The Makeup/First Kiss" – 2:25
3. "Apartment Dwelling/Hollywood Loft" – 0:48
4. "Arrival/Airport/Catching Julia/Gotta Stop Them" – 2:55
5. "Flower Shop Talk/To the Restaurant/The Realization/Mi Familia" – 3:27
6. "Light Conversation/Chivalrous Gestures/He's Married/Forget Me Not" – 3:25
7. "Liz Leaves/Having Sex/I Have No Life" – 3:10
8. "Julia Sees the Light/Edgar & Estelle/Young Love/First Time" – 3:31
9. "She Said No/Don't Go/I Like Her" – 3:50
10. "My Life's a Mess/This Is Awkward" – 1:22
11. "Ride Home/Guys Talk" – 1:47
12. "Mom's Home/Soccer Practice/Bike Ride" – 2:23
13. "Reed and Julia" – 2:26
14. "Valentine's Day" – 2:31
15. "Every Time You Smiled" (Carina Round) – 2:53

== Reception ==
=== Box office ===
The film debuted in the US on February 12, 2010, with $52.4 million its opening weekend, grabbing the number 1 spot over the holiday that shares its name. The film ousted two other high-profile openings; 20th Century Fox's action fantasy Percy Jackson & the Olympians: The Lightning Thief, which debuted at number 2 with $31.1 million over three days, and Universal's werewolf film The Wolfman, with $30.6 million. It is currently the ninth-highest opening weekend in February, and the sixth highest-grossing President's Day weekend film.

On Monday, February 15, 2010, Valentine's Day went down to #2 behind Percy Jackson and the Olympians: The Lightning Thief, but then went back up #1 on Tuesday. On Friday, February 19, it went down to #2 behind Shutter Island then to #3 the next day. By Friday, February 26, it went down to #5 behind Shutter Island, The Crazies, Cop Out and Avatar. By March 18, it went down to #14. It stayed in theaters until May 6, 2010. With that record, it is the second biggest opening for a romantic comedy film behind Sex and the City with $57 million.

The passing of the Valentine's Day holiday later had the film's box office results quickly declining with a total of $110 million in the United States and Canada as well as an additional $106 million overseas for a grand total of $216 million worldwide.

=== Critical response ===
On Rotten Tomatoes, the film has an approval percentage of 18% based on 188 reviews and a rating of 4.00 out of 10. The critics consensus reads: "Eager to please and stuffed with stars, Valentine's Day squanders its promise with a frantic, episodic plot and an abundance of rom-com cliches." On Metacritic, the film has a score of 34 out of 100 based on 33 critic reviews, meaning "generally unfavorable reviews". Audiences polled by CinemaScore gave the film an average grade of "B" on an A+ to F scale.

Yahoo Movies critics averaged the film's grade as a C−. Giving the film three out of four stars, the overall opinion of Carrie Rickey's review for The Philadelphia Inquirer is that "It is a pleasant, undemanding movie that takes place over 18 hours on V-Day and considers Very Attractive People whose romantic destinies converge, diverge, and cloverleaf like the interstates threading through California's Southland".

Betsy Sharkey of the Los Angeles Times commented that "The effect of all those spinning songs, stars and scenarios is merry-go-round-like, producing a sort of dizzying collage that no doubt some will adore, while others will just get nauseous..." British film critic Mark Kermode called the film a "greeting card full of vomit".

Rene Rodriguez for the Miami Herald gave the film two out of four stars, describing the film as "surfing through the channels of an all-chick-flick cable service". Rodriguez also criticized the film's blandness, stating the film should have "shed some of its blander plotlines[…] and spent a little more time exploring the thrill and elation of being in love – or at least just being horny". Slate movie critic Dana Stevens wrote that the film "lacks in charm, humor, and intelligence...".

Peter Travers of Rolling Stone gave the film one star out of four. Travers' analysis of the film simply states that "Valentine's Day is a date movie from hell". Jonathan Ross was not complimentary either on his Film 2010 show. He said "I thought the film was just awful".

Valentine's Day is noted for sharing similarities with the British film Love Actually, particularly the basic premise of multiple storylines occurring around a popular holiday, and sometimes identical subplots. Many British bloggers and online critics described Valentine's Day as "an American copycat version of Love Actually", focusing on how Valentine's Day, like Love Actually, has an all-star cast whose characters' storylines intertwine with one another.

Journalist Sady Doyle, in a hostile review for The Guardian, argued that Valentine's Day was the worst film ever made. Time named it one of the top 10 worst chick flicks.

=== Accolades ===
Award	Category	Recipients	Result
Alliance of Women Film Journalists	Hall of Shame	Garry Marshall	Nominated
ASCAP Film and Television Music Awards	Top Box Office Films	John Debney	Won
Casting Society of America	Big Budget Feature – Comedy	Deborah Aquila and Tricia Wood	Nominated
Golden Raspberry Awards	Worst Actor	Ashton Kutcher	Won
Golden Raspberry Awards	Worst Actor	Taylor Lautner	Nominated
Golden Raspberry Awards	Worst Supporting Actor	George Lopez	Nominated
Golden Raspberry Awards	Worst Supporting Actress	Jessica Alba	Won
MTV Movie Awards	Best Kiss	Taylor Swift and Taylor Lautner	Nominated
People's Choice Awards	Favorite Comedy Movie		Nominated
Teen Choice Awards	Choice Movie: Romantic Comedy		Won
Teen Choice Awards	Choice Movie Actor: Romantic Comedy	Ashton Kutcher	Won
Teen Choice Awards	Choice Movie Actress: Romantic Comedy	Queen Latifah	Nominated
Teen Choice Awards	Choice Movie: Chemistry	Taylor Swift and Taylor Lautner	Nominated
Teen Choice Awards	Choice Movie: Liplock	Taylor Swift and Taylor Lautner	Nominated
Teen Choice Awards	Choice Movie: Hissy Fit	Jessica Biel	Nominated
Teen Choice Awards	Choice Movie Scene Stealer: Male	George Lopez	Nominated
Teen Choice Awards	Choice Movie Scene Stealer: Female	Anne Hathaway	Nominated
Teen Choice Awards	Choice Movie Breakout: Female	Taylor Swift	Won

== Home media ==
Valentine's Day was released on Region 1 DVD, iTunes and Blu-ray Disc on 18 May 2010.

== See also ==
- New Year's Eve (2011 film)
- Mother's Day (2016 film)
