= Tracy Reiner =

American actress (born 1964)

- Born: Tracy Henry; July 7, 1964 (age 62); Albuquerque, New Mexico, U.S.
- Occupation: Actress
- Years active: 1977–2015
- Children: 5
- Parents: Penny Marshall (mother); Rob Reiner (adoptive father)
- Relatives: Anthony W. Marshall (maternal grandfather); Garry Marshall (maternal uncle); Ronny Hallin (maternal aunt); Scott Marshall (cousin); Michele Singer Reiner (adoptive stepmother); Estelle Reiner (adoptive paternal grandmother); Carl Reiner (adoptive paternal grandfather); Annie Reiner (adoptive paternal aunt); Lucas Reiner (adoptive paternal uncle)

Tracy Reiner (/ˈraɪnər/; née Henry; born July 7, 1964) is an American former actress. She is known for her roles in When Harry Met Sally..., Masque of the Red Death, A League of Their Own, and Apollo 13.

== Early life ==
Reiner was born Tracy Henry in Albuquerque, New Mexico. She is the biological daughter of actress and director Penny Marshall and Michael Henry. Her mother was married for 10 years to Rob Reiner, who adopted and raised her. Her mother was of Italian, English, German, and Scottish descent.

Reiner attended the Lycée Français de Los Angeles, where she created the school's first prom at The Beverly Hills Hotel in 1980. She graduated in 1982. She later attended Bennington College, where she majored in the History of Storytelling.

== Career ==
Reiner starred in the 1989 film Masque of the Red Death as Lucretia. She has appeared in nearly 30 films, among them Jumpin' Jack Flash (1986), Die Hard (1988), When Harry Met Sally... (1989), A League of Their Own (1992), and Apollo 13 (1995). She was associate producer of the documentary Children of the Revolution: Tune Back In (2005). In 2013, Reiner headed a team to fund and market medical software.

== Filmography ==
=== Film ===
Year	Title	Role	Notes
1984	The Flamingo Kid	Polly	
1985	The Sure Thing	Alison's Friend	
1986	Nothing in Common	Young Saleswoman	
1986	Jumpin' Jack Flash	Page's Secretary	
1988	Big	Test Market Researcher	
1988	Die Hard	Thornburg's Assistant	
1988	Beaches	Dept. Store Clerk	
1989	When Harry Met Sally...	Emily	
1989	New Year's Day	Marjorie	
1989	Masque of the Red Death	Lucrecia	
1990	Pretty Woman	Woman at Car	
1991	Frankie and Johnny	Attorney at Party	
1991	Ted & Venus	Shelly	
1992	A League of Their Own	Betty Horn	
1995	Apollo 13	Mary Haise	
1996	That Thing You Do!	Anita	
1996	Frame by Frame		
1998	With Friends Like These...	Scorsese Assistant	
1999	The Other Sister	Michelle	
2000	Straight Right	Mrs. Parker	
2001	The New Woman	Dr. Fritzi Haller	
2001	The Princess Diaries	Press Secretary Spencer	
2001	Riding in Cars with Boys	Nurse	
2003	Saved by the Rules	Summer	
2004	Raising Helen	Job Interviewer	
2004	The Princess Diaries 2: Royal Engagement	Lady Anthony	
2006	Stay Awake	Vera	Short
2006	State's Evidence	Cashier	
2010	Valentine's Day	French Photographer	
2015	Chloe and Theo	Homeless Woman	

=== Television ===
Year	Title	Role	Notes
1977	Laverne & Shirley	Helen	"Tag Team Wrestling"
1979	Laverne & Shirley	Carole	"Bad Girls"
1981	Laverne & Shirley	Tracy	"Young at Heart"
1990	Partners in Life	Dockside Innocent	TV film
1993	A League of Their Own	Betty Horn	Main role
