= Ronny Hallin =

American actress (1938–2026)

- Born: January 2, 1938
- Died: October 27, 2026 (aged 88)
- Occupations: Producer, actress
- Years active: 1974–2026
- Spouse: Larry Hallin (divorced)
- Children: 3
- Father: Anthony W. Marshall
- Relatives: Garry Marshall (brother); Penny Marshall (sister); Tracy Reiner (niece); Scott Marshall (nephew)

Ronny Hallin (January 2, 1938 – October 27, 2026) was an American television producer and actress. She was best known for her work on the television shows Happy Days, Mork & Mindy, and Step by Step.

== Life and career ==
Hallin was born on January 2, 1938, the older sister of actress Penny Marshall, and the younger sister of filmmaker Garry Marshall.

Hallin died on October 27, 2026, at the age of 88.

== Filmography ==
=== Television ===
==== As producer ====
- Blansky's Beauties (1976–1979)
- Happy Days (1977–1984)
- Mork & Mindy (1978–1982)
- Laverne & Shirley (1979)
- Joanie Loves Chachi (1981–1983)
- You Again? (1985–1987)
- Valerie (1985–1991)
- Nothing in Common (1986–1987)
- Family Matters (1989–1990)
- Perfect Strangers (1989–1992)
- Going Places (1990–1991)
- Step by Step (1991–1992)

==== As actress ====
- The Odd Couple (1974)
- Laverne & Shirley (1982)

=== Film ===
==== As actress ====
- Herndon (1982)
- Frankie and Johnny (1991)
- Exit to Eden (1994)
- Raising Helen (2004)
