= New Year's Eve (2011 film) =

2011 film directed by Garry Marshall

- Theatrical release poster
- Directed by: Garry Marshall
- Written by: Katherine Fugate
- Produced by: Mike Karz; Wayne Allan Rice; Garry Marshall
- Starring: Halle Berry; Jessica Biel; Jon Bon Jovi; Abigail Breslin; Chris "Ludacris" Bridges; Robert De Niro; Josh Duhamel; Zac Efron; Héctor Elizondo; Katherine Heigl; Ashton Kutcher; Seth Meyers; Lea Michele; Sarah Jessica Parker; Michelle Pfeiffer; Til Schweiger; Hilary Swank; Sofía Vergara
- Cinematography: Charles Minsky
- Edited by: Michael Tronick
- Music by: John Debney
- Production companies: New Line Cinema; Wayne Rice Films; Karz Entertainment
- Distributed by: Warner Bros. Pictures
- Release dates: December 9, 2011; December 9, 2026 (2026 Re-release, Theatrical)
- Running time: 118 minutes
- Country: United States
- Language: English
- Budget: $56 million
- Box office: $142 million

New Year's Eve is a 2011 American romantic comedy film directed by Garry Marshall, written by Katherine Fugate, and starring an ensemble cast consisting of Halle Berry, Jessica Biel, Jon Bon Jovi, Abigail Breslin, Chris "Ludacris" Bridges, Robert De Niro, Josh Duhamel, Zac Efron, Héctor Elizondo, Katherine Heigl, Ashton Kutcher, Seth Meyers, Lea Michele, Sarah Jessica Parker, Michelle Pfeiffer, Til Schweiger, Hilary Swank, and Sofía Vergara. It tells an assortment of different stories that happen on New Year's Eve where the characters interconnect with each other.

New Year's Eve is the second in an unofficial trilogy of romantic comedy films directed by Garry Marshall, set on a one-day holiday and featuring an ensemble cast in a variety of stories, the other films being Valentine's Day (2010) and Mother's Day (2016).

New Year's Eve was released by Warner Bros. Pictures on December 9, 2011, and received generally negative reviews from critics but grossed $142 million against a $56 million budget.

== Plot ==
The film follows several interconnected people on New Year's Eve in New York City.

Vice-president of the Times Square Alliance Claire Morgan is finishing arrangements for the ball drop. Meanwhile, after being nearly hit by a car and denied a vacation, Ahern Records secretary Ingrid Withers quits and offers deliveryman Paul Doyle tickets for the Ahern Records Masquerade Ball for help in completing her New Year's resolutions before midnight, and he accepts.

Paul's older sister Kim is struggling with teenage daughter Hailey who prefers spending New Year's Eve with her friends and her boyfriend Seth Anderson in Times Square over her, a lonely, recently divorced mom. Paul's best friend, comic book illustrator Randy, hates New Year's Eve as his girlfriend left him on the date. He gets stuck in an elevator with Elise, an aspiring backup singer for musician Daniel Jensen at his Times Square show. Jensen is also preparing to perform at the Ahern Records ball while attempting to rekindle his relationship with former fiancée, Laura.

At a nearby hospital, Claire's father Stan Harris is close to succumbing to cancer. Refusing chemotherapy, he wishes only to see the ball drop one last time. He is kept company by Nurses Aimee and Mindy after his doctor confirms he will soon pass. In the same hospital, young Griffin and Tess Byrne are about to have their first child and compete with James and Grace Schwab for the New Year's Day baby bonus.

Elsewhere businessman Sam Ahern Jr., the son of the late founder Sam Ahern Sr. of Ahern Records, is on his way to the company ball to deliver an important speech when his car crashes in Connecticut. All the while he wonders if he should reunite with a mysterious woman he met and fell in love with on the previous New Year's Eve. Unable to find a mechanic or tow truck, he accepts a lift from a family in an RV.

Later that evening, one of the LED panels on the Times Square Ball malfunctions, jamming it and forcing Claire to call Kominsky, a disgruntled electrician whom the company had fired a few weeks prior. He repairs the ball before midnight, and, in gratitude, she leaves him in charge as she rushes to see the ball drop with her father, Stan.

Meanwhile, Nurse Aimee video conferences with her husband Chino, an Afghanistan-deployed soldier. Stan passes away shortly after he and Claire watch the ball drop from the hospital's roof, amid a chorus of "Auld Lang Syne", with Claire weeping and holding his hand.

Paul helps Ingrid complete her resolutions, so she gives him the tickets. They say goodbye, but he later takes her to the Ahern Records ball as his date. Meanwhile, Randy and Elise bond in the elevator. Just as they are about to kiss, the elevator is repaired by the building superintendent, so Elise hurries to Jensen's show.

Randy notices Elise forgot her rubber bracelet so rushes to give it to her, still in pajamas. At Times Square, Jensen leaves midway through his show to return to the Ahern Ball to apologize to Laura, who takes him back and leaves with Sam's approval. Elise replaces Jensen and attracts the attention of the crowd. She kisses Randy, starting a romantic relationship.

Griffin and Tess have their baby and, although it is born first, they lie so James and Grace can have the $25,000 bonus after discovering they have two other children to provide for. Meanwhile, after being forbidden from attending the celebration, Hailey runs away to Times Square, where she sees Seth being kissed by another girl named Lily. Unaware it was a kiss against his will, the heartbroken Hailey meets and is comforted by her mother. Kim finally realizes she was selfish for not allowing her to spend New Year's with them. Seth finds them and apologizes, revealing Lily has stolen the kiss. Hailey forgives him and kisses him back. Her mother allows her to go to an after-party.

Kim then rushes to a restaurant to reunite with Sam after he delivered his speech. She is the mysterious woman whom he met last year, and they finally share their names with each other. The film ends with Paul and Ingrid having fun at the Ahern Records ball party.

== Cast ==
=== Resolution Tour ===
- Michelle Pfeiffer as Ingrid Withers
- Zac Efron as Paul Doyle
- Fiona Choi as Balinese Woman

=== Hospital Story ===
- Robert De Niro as Stan Harris
- Halle Berry as Nurse Aimee
- Alyssa Milano as Nurse Mindy
- Cary Elwes as Stan's Doctor
- Common as Chino, Aimee's husband

=== Maternity Ward ===
- Seth Meyers as Griffin Byrne
- Jessica Biel as Tess Byrne, Griffin's wife
- Til Schweiger as James Schwab
- Sarah Paulson as Grace Schwab, James's wife
- Carla Gugino as Dr. Morriset
- Peter Allen Vogt as Male Nurse

=== Jensen & Laura's Story ===
- Jon Bon Jovi as Daniel Jensen
- Katherine Heigl as Laura, Daniel's former fiancée
- Sofía Vergara as Ava
- Russell Peters as Chef Sunil

=== Elevator ===
- Ashton Kutcher as Randy
- Lea Michele as Elise
- Jim Belushi as Building Superintendent

=== Mother & Daughter ===
- Sarah Jessica Parker as Kim Doyle, Paul's older sister
- Abigail Breslin as Hailey Doyle, Kim's daughter and Paul's niece
- Jake T. Austin as Seth Anderson, Hailey's boyfriend
- Katherine McNamara as Lily Bowman
- Mara Davi as Mika
- Nat Wolff as Walter

=== Ahern Party ===
- Josh Duhamel as Sam Ahern Jr.
- Larry Miller as Harley
- Cherry Jones as Mrs. Rose Ahern, Sam's widowed mother
- Joey McIntyre as Rory
- Sean O'Bryan as Pastor Edwin
- Jack McGee as Grandpa Jed
- Yeardley Smith as Maude
- Penny Marshall as Herself
- Drena De Niro as Ahern, Waitress
- Christine Lakin as Alyssa, Waitress
- Shea Curry as Wendy
- Amar'e Stoudemire as Party Dancer

=== Times Square ===
- Hilary Swank as Claire Morgan, Stan's biological daughter
- Chris "Ludacris" Bridges as Lieutenant Brendan Nolan
- Héctor Elizondo as Lester Kominsky
- Kathleen Marshall as Stage Manager Charlotte
- Matthew Walker as Engineer Douglas
- Pat Battle as Herself
- Ryan Seacrest as Himself

=== Uncredited ===
- Michael Bloomberg as Himself
- Matthew Broderick as Mr. Buellerton
- John Lithgow as Jonathan Cox

== Reception ==
=== Critical reception ===
On review aggregation website Rotten Tomatoes, the film has an approval rating of 7%, based on 136 reviews, and an average rating of 3.2/10. The site's critical consensus reads: "Shallow, sappy, and dull, New Year's Eve assembles a star-studded cast for no discernible purpose." On Metacritic, the film has a score of 22 out of 100, based on 30 critics, indicating "generally unfavorable" reviews. Audiences polled by CinemaScore gave the film an average grade of "B+" on a scale of A+ to F.

Roger Ebert of the Chicago Sun-Times said, New Year's Eve is a dreary plod through the sands of time until finally the last grain has trickled through the hourglass of cinematic sludge. How is it possible to assemble more than two dozen stars in a movie and find nothing interesting for any of them to do?"

Kimberley Jones of the Austin Chronicle said, "Mostly, New Year's Eve is appalling stuff, a poorly constructed, sentimental sham. Auld Lang Syne."

Claudia Winkleman on the BBC One show Film... said, "I have found the worst film of all time, and it is called New Year's Eve."

Rolling Stone shared the same opinion and rated it zero stars, stating, "Director Garry Marshall follows last year's Valentine's Day romcom crapfest with an even more puke-up-able sample of the species," and concluding, New Year's Eve is "bad beyond belief".

British newspaper The Telegraph named New Year's Eve one of the ten worst films of 2011.

British film critic Mark Kermode named it as the worst film of 2011.

On the more positive side, Entertainment Weekly's Owen Gleiberman said, "New Year's Eve is dunderheaded kitsch, but it's the kind of marzipan movie that can sweetly soak up a holiday evening."

=== Box office ===
The film opened in the No. 1 spot at the box office, with $13 million. It made $54.5 million in the United States and Canada, as well as $87.5 million in other countries, for a worldwide total of $142 million.

=== Accolades ===
The film earned five Razzie Award nominations: Worst Picture, Worst Director (Garry Marshall), Worst Actress (Sarah Jessica Parker), Worst Screenplay and Worst Screen Ensemble, losing all to Adam Sandler's Jack and Jill.

Award	Category	Recipients	Result
Alliance of Women Film Journalists	Actress Most in Need of a New Agent	All actresses in New Year's Eve	Won
BET Awards	Best Actor	Common	Nominated
Golden Raspberry Awards	Worst Picture		Nominated
Golden Raspberry Awards	Worst Director	Garry Marshall	Nominated
Golden Raspberry Awards	Worst Actress	Sarah Jessica Parker	Nominated
Golden Raspberry Awards	Worst Screenplay	Katherine Fugate	Nominated
Golden Raspberry Awards	Worst Screen Ensemble	The entire cast of New Year's Eve	Nominated
Golden Trailer Awards	Golden Fleece	"One Night Domestic Trailer"	Nominated
Teen Choice Awards	Choice Movie Scene Stealer: Female	Lea Michele	Nominated

== Parodies ==
New Year's Eve, and its predecessor Valentine's Day, were parodied in December 2011 on the sketch comedy series Saturday Night Live in a trailer for the fictional film The Apocalypse, set on the last day on Earth.

They were similarly parodied on the TV show 30 Rock, in the January 2012 episode "The Ballad of Kenneth Parcell", in a trailer for a film called Martin Luther King Day, whose large cast includes Jenna Maroney.
