= Katherine Fugate =

American screenwriter and producer

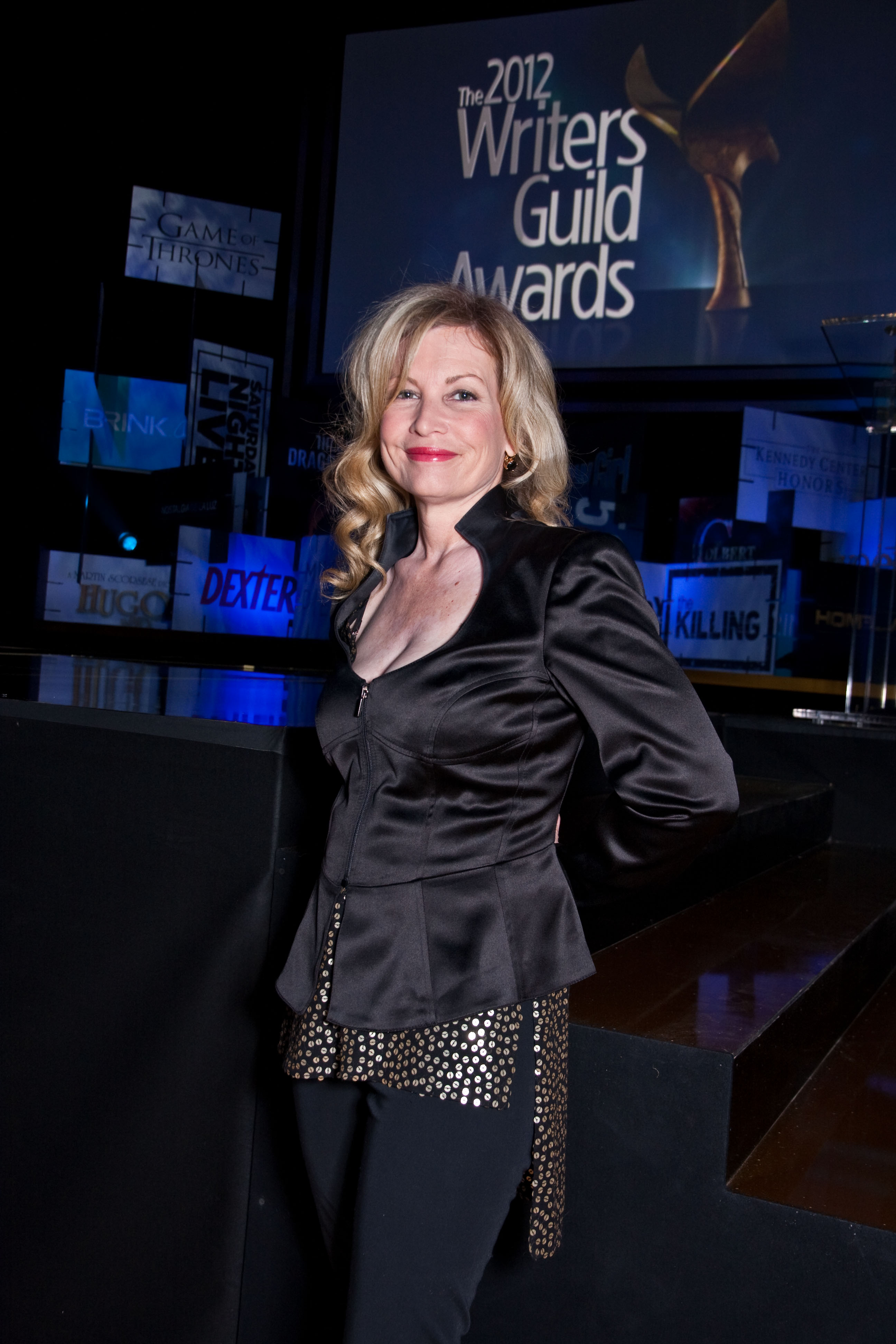
- Katherine Fugate at the Writers Guild of America Awards in 2012
- Born: July 14, 1965 (age 61)
- Education: University of California, Riverside
- Occupations: Screenwriter; producer
- Children: 1
- Relatives: Barbara Eden (aunt)
- Writing career
- Period: 1996–present

Katherine Fugate (born July 14, 1965) is an American film and television screenwriter and producer.

== Early life and education ==
Fugate graduated with a B.A. in Theatre Arts and a minor in Journalism from University of California, Riverside. Fugate and her aunt, the actress Barbara Eden, are direct descendants of Benjamin Franklin. Her cousin was the late Matthew Ansara, son of Barbara Eden.

== Career ==
Katherine Fugate is perhaps best known as the creator and executive producer of the TV series, Army Wives.

She also wrote the screenplays for the 2010 film Valentine's Day and the 2011 follow-up, New Year's Eve. Both films were directed by Garry Marshall and featured all-star ensemble casts. Additional credits include, "The Prince & Me," directed by Martha Coolidge, "Carolina," directed by Marleen Gorris, the TV movie "A Killer Among Us," based on a true story, and the TV series, "Xena: Warrior Princess." She also contributed dialogue to the 2010 foreign language film, "Room in Rome," directed by Julio Medem.

Katherine wrote a PSA short film for the "Joining Forces" campaign spearheaded by Michelle Obama during the Obama Administration, directed by Joanna Kerns with a voice-over by Steven Spielberg.

Fugate has been an active leader in the Writers Guild of America (WGA) for a number of years. She was a strike captain in the 2007-2008 Writers Guild of America strike, then won a two-year seat on the Board of Directors for the WGA, West (WGAw) in 2008. Fugate was re-elected to the WGAW Board of Directors in 2010, 2012, and 2014.

Katherine is a member of the Academy of Television Arts & Sciences.

Katherine's short story on growing up with domestic violence, "Nobody Would Be Surprised If I Had Died," was honored on Sports Illustrated's Best of Journalism, 2017. Katherine donated the publishing rights to DomesticShelters.org where her piece was republished in a book collection placed inside domestic violence shelters in America.

== Awards and honorable recognitions ==
The Republique of France and La Ministre de la Culture awarded Madame Katherine Fugate with the distinction of "Commandeur de L'Order des Arts et des Lettres," in Paris, 31 Mai 2018.

Honored by Variety on the Top 50 Women of Impact in Hollywood list.

Winner of the Gracie Allen Award for Outstanding Drama for Army Wives.

== Personal life ==
Katherine Fugate has never been married. She is a single mom and has one child. They have been guests together on The Stephanie Miller Show on SiriusXM.

== Screenwriting credits ==
=== Television ===
- Max Steel (2000)
- Xena: Warrior Princess (2001)
- Army Wives (2007-2008)
- Christmas Eve At The Ranch (TBA)
- Home Front (2026)

=== Film ===
- Kounterfeit (1996)
- Carolina (2003)
- The Prince & Me (2004)
- Valentine’s Day (2010)
- Room In Rome (2010)
- New Year’s Eve (2011)
- A Killer Among Us (2012)
- Christmas Eve (TBA)
- Christy (2025)
