= Charles Minsky =

American cinematographer

Charles Minsky ASC
- Occupation: Cinematographer
- Years active: 1984–2017

Charles David Minsky is an American cinematographer. He is best known for his frequent collaborations with film director Garry Marshall. Their works together include Pretty Woman, Dear God, Raising Helen, The Princess Diaries 2: Royal Engagement, Valentine's Day, New Year's Eve and Mother's Day.

== Filmography ==
- Radioactive Dreams (1984)
- April Fool's Day (1986)
- Weekend Warriors (1986)
- Pretty Woman (1990)
- Dutch (1991)
- The Gun in Betty Lou's Handbag (1992)
- Past Tense (TV) (1994)
- Kazaam (1996)
- Dear God (1996)
- Guinevere (1999)
- Looking for an Echo (2000)
- Tomcats (2001)
- Slap Her... She's French (2002)
- Welcome to Collinwood (2002)
- Raising Helen (2004)
- The Princess Diaries 2: Royal Engagement (2004)
- The Producers (2005)
- Keeping Up with the Steins (2006)
- You, Me and Dupree (2006)
- The Russell Girl (TV) (2008)
- Post Grad (2009)
- Loving Leah (TV) (2009)
- Valentine's Day (2010)
- Something Borrowed (2011)
- New Year's Eve (2011)
- Mother's Day (2016)
- Adventures in Babysitting (TV) (2016)
