= Keeping Up with the Steins =

2006 film by Scott Marshall

- Theatrical release poster
- Directed by: Scott Marshall
- Written by: Mark Zakarin
- Produced by: A.D. Oppenheim
- Starring: Daryl Sabara; Jami Gertz; Jeremy Piven; Cheryl Hines; Garry Marshall; Daryl Hannah
- Cinematography: Charles Minsky
- Edited by: Tara Timpon
- Music by: John Debney
- Production company: Miramax Films
- Distributed by: Miramax Films
- Release date: May 12, 2006
- Running time: 99 minutes
- Country: United States
- Language: English
- Budget: $5 million
- Box office: $4.4 million

Keeping Up with the Steins is a 2006 American comedy film directed by Scott Marshall, written by Mark Zakarin, and starring Garry Marshall, Jeremy Piven, Jami Gertz and Daryl Hannah. The film is a commentary on how too many Jewish families see a bar mitzvah or bat mitzvah not as a coming of age for their son or daughter, but rather as an excuse to throw outrageously lavish parties which end in drama.

== Plot ==
Benjamin Fiedler is the 12-year-old son of Jewish couple Adam and Joanne Fiedler. After attending the elaborate bar mitzvah party for the son of Arnie Stein — which was done on a cruise ship, with a Titanic theme — Benjamin's parents decide to go all out for his bar mitzvah to compete with them.

Benjamin is unsure of how he wants to do for the bar mitzvah party they will have for his 13th birthday in three months' time. Under pressure, he randomly chooses baseball as the theme. So Adam's plan for the festivities with the party planner is to rent Dodger Stadium, complete with movie stars and everything. Adam even books Neil Diamond to sing the national anthem.

However, Benjamin is trepidacious about it all and does not want to go through with it, as he does not even understand the words of the haftorah he has to read as part of his bar mitzvah rite. To distract his father and try to stall the planning, he secretly invites his estranged grandfather Irwin, who is now living on an Indian reservation with a New Age woman named Sacred Feather.

When Benjamin's grandfather arrives, it puts a kink in the planning - as Irwin had a falling out with his son Adam, both for having left him and his mother when he was a teenager and for Adam's own humiliating bar mitzvah. Irwin manages to win over his grandson, whom he hadn't seen since right after the birth, Joanne and even Rose, who he'd abandoned and left to raise Adam alone.

Irwin must then pull off somehow reconciling with his son while helping his grandson deal with the question of what it means to be a "man."

Now seeing his bar mitzvah not as an excuse to throw a party but rather as a rite of passage in his Jewish life, Benjamin gets up the courage to tell his parents to call off the over-the-top bash they had planned.

After he does very well at the service, the party is just a casual backyard affair with lunch, a klezmer band (with a guest-star singer and guitarist, as Adam "couldn't cancel Neil Diamond") who was there as a favor to Benjamin's grandmother. The Steins are there, envious of the non-expensive, yet successful party. Benjamin goes to extreme measures to distract Adam and Irwin from bickering, by walking into and sitting on the bottom of the pool. Ultimately he's successful in getting the father and son to reach peace, and Benjamin happily celebrates with lots of family and friends.

== Cast ==
- Daryl Sabara as Benjamin "Ben" Fiedler
- Jami Gertz as Joanne Fiedler
- Jeremy Piven as Adam Fiedler
- Larry Miller as Arnie Stein
- Sandra Taylor as Raylene Stein
- Carter Jenkins as Zachary "Zach" Stein
- Miranda Cosgrove as Karen Sussman
- Britt Robertson as Ashley Grunwald
- Cheryl Hines as Casey Nudelman
- Daryl Hannah as Sandy Frost / Sacred Feather
- Garry Marshall as Irwin Fiedler
- Doris Roberts as Rose Fiedler
- Marc John Jefferies as Tim
- Richard Benjamin as Rabbi Schulberg
- DJ Quik as Himself
- Neil Diamond as Himself

== Production ==
The working title for the film was Lucky 13.

While shooting this film, Daryl Sabara was also studying for his own bar mitzvah. The Haftorah portion that his character chants in the film was Sabara's actual bar mitzvah portion.

Congregation Ari-El, the synagogue where Daryl Sabara's character is to have his bar mitzvah, which is shown on an exterior shot, is a real synagogue in North Hollywood, called Adat Ari El, and was founded by members of the film industry. It has an Ark (where the scrolls of the Torah are kept) built by Jewish carpenters working for Warner Bros. that was originally used on a film set, and installed in the synagogue after the movie was completed.

== Reception ==
The film holds a 36% rating at Rotten Tomatoes based on 84 reviews, with an average rating of 4.9/10. The website’s critics consensus reads: "Keeping Up With the Steins is one of those comedies that play more like a corny sitcom than a theatrical movie."

Stephen Holden of The New York Times wrote, Keeping Up With the Steins "begins as a growling, razor-toothed satire of carnivorous consumption in Hollywood" and said it "would have been a much better film if it had waited twice as long before retracting its fangs". He added, "Satire is probably the wrong word to describe this hilarious first half-hour. In certain obscenely wealthy circles, this is how it really is." Roger Ebert gave the film 3 out of 4 stars.
