= Kounterfeit =

- Directed by: John Mallory Asher
- Written by: David Chase, Katherine Fugate and Jay Irwin
- Starring: Hilary Swank; Bruce Payne; Corbin Bernsen
- Distributed by: Showcase Entertainment
- Release date: 1996
- Running time: 90 minutes
- Country: United States
- Language: English

Kounterfeit is a 1996 American direct-to-video crime/thriller film starring Bruce Payne and Hilary Swank. Kounterfeit was directed by John Mallory Asher and written by David Chase, Katherine Fugate and Jay Irwin.

== Plot summary ==
A counterfeiter of money is attacked by two masked men and threatened to reveal where a certain amount of counterfeit money is. The counterfeiter pleads ignorance and is subsequently killed. Tommy 'Hopscotch' Hopkins, who has the money, learns of the death of the counterfeiter and begins to fear for his own safety. Consequently, he asks his friend, the street smart and "seasoned former criminal" Frankie (who owns a strip club), to assist him in an exchange of the fake money for real money which he has organised with some acquaintances. Frankie reluctantly agrees to assist his friend. During the exchange, an undercover police officer, Danny, is killed in a shootout. The shootout is witnessed by Danny's sister Colleen, who was hiding in the house. Distraught, she mistakenly believes that Frankie killed her brother. Colleen becomes frustrated with her ex-boyfriend, Vic, whose investigation into Danny's murder proceeds slowly, and decides to undertake her own investigation.

== Main cast ==
- Hilary Swank as Colleen
- Bruce Payne as Frankie
- Corbin Bernsen as Marty Hopkins
- Mark-Paul Gosselaar as Paco/Danny
- Gil Bernardy as Counterfeiter
- Andrew Hawkes as Tommy 'Hopscotch' Hopkins
- Michael Gross as Captain Evans
- Rob Stewart as Vic
- Elizabeth Gracen as Bridgette
- Ben Foster as Travis
- Doug McKeon as Patron
- Jay Irwin as Contact 1
- Brad James as Contact 2

Bruce Payne and Elizabeth Gracen both played Immortals in the popular Highlander franchise.

== Reception ==
The TV Guide website has given the film a rating of 2.5 out of 4. A reviewer for the TV Guide stated that 'Frankie's slablike features and seedy-cool demeanor initially makes him just one outsized thug among many, but Payne gradually warms up the protagonist and balances nicely against Hawkes's scenery-chewing Joe Pesci act'. Matt Spector stated that the film 'is enjoyable with enough action scenes and twists and turns to keep the audience interested'. A different reviewer stated that 'the ungainly script is low on both ideas and excitement'. Mick Martin and Marsha Porter described the film as a 'mildly diverting tale of two low life hoods'. Dragan Antulov stated that 'the plot recycles many obligatory elements of low budget crime movies (vengeance as the prime motive for one of the protagonist, good guys who don't turn out so good at the end) and combines them with Tarantinoesque portrayal of small time criminals as protagonists'. VPRO Cinema awarded the film 3 out of 5 stars. A reviewer for Film Review stated that 'Payne oozes charisma in a film which delivers plenty of cheap thrills but few surprises'. Edmond Grant stated that the film's 'involved skullduggery holds few surprises in the end'. Joe Corey stated that the film 'seems like a cheap Miami Vice knock-off minus the golden talents of Philip Michael Thomas'. Nonetheless, Corey praised the acting of Hilary Swank, stating that she 'is the reason this film deserves to be seen' as 'she does her best to give life to a character that barely reads on the page' and 'seems very calm dealing with a script that over twists itself with the subterfuge'.
