= Penny Marshall =

American actress, director, and producer (1943–2018)

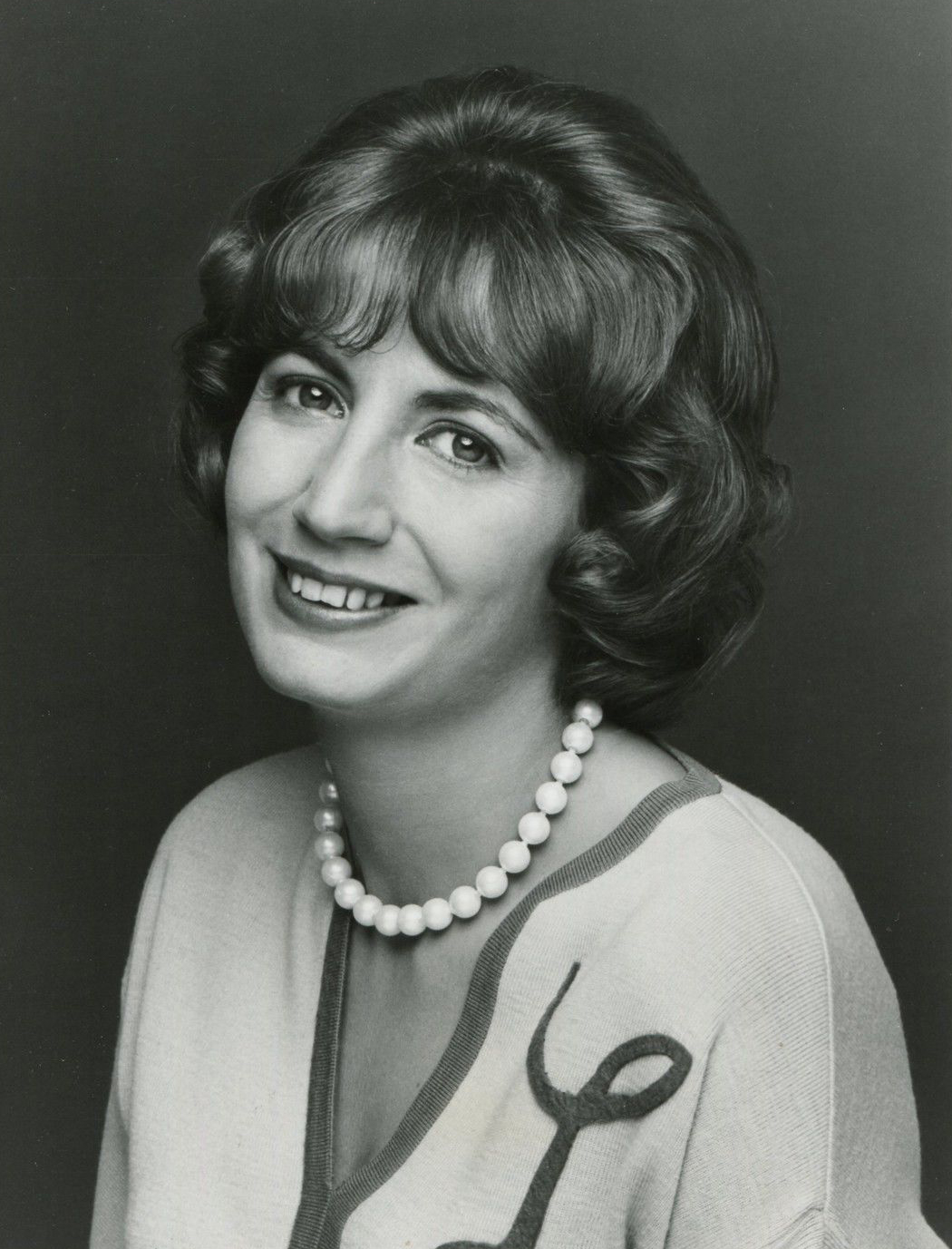
- Publicity photo for Laverne & Shirley (1976)
- Born: Carole Penny Marshall; October 15, 1943; New York City, U.S.
- Died: December 17, 2018 (aged 75); Los Angeles, California, U.S.
- Burial place: Forest Lawn Memorial Park
- Occupations: Actress; director; producer
- Years active: 1968–2018
- Spouses: Mike Henry (m. 1963; div. 1966); Rob Reiner (m. 1971; div. 1981)
- Children: Tracy Reiner
- Father: Anthony W. Marshall
- Relatives: Garry Marshall (brother); Ronny Hallin (sister); Scott Marshall (nephew)

Carole Penny Marshall (October 15, 1943 – December 17, 2018) was an American actress, film director, and producer. She starred as Laverne DeFazio on the television sitcom Laverne & Shirley from 1976 to 1983, and received three nominations for the Golden Globe Award for Best Actress – Television Series Musical or Comedy for her portrayal.

Marshall made her directorial debut with Jumpin' Jack Flash (1986) before directing Big (1988), which became the first film directed by a woman to gross more than $100 million at the U.S. box office. Her subsequent directing credits included Awakenings (1990) (which was nominated for Academy Award for Best Picture), A League of Their Own (1992), Renaissance Man (1994), The Preacher's Wife (1996), and Riding in Cars with Boys (2001). She also produced Cinderella Man and Bewitched (both 2005), and directed episodes of the television series According to Jim and United States of Tara.

== Early life ==
Carole "Penny" Marshall was born in Manhattan on October 15, 1943, to Marjorie Irene Ward (whose middle name was sometimes later cited as Evelyn), a tap dance teacher who ran the Marjorie Marshall Dance School, and Anthony W. Marshall (né Antonio Masciarelli), a director of industrial films and later a producer. She had a brother, actor/director/TV producer Garry Marshall; and a sister, television producer Ronny Hallin. Penny's birth name, Carole, was selected because her mother's favorite actress was Carole Lombard. Her middle name was selected because her older sister Ronny, wanting a horse, was saving pennies; their mother chose the middle name in an attempt to console Ronny.

Penny's father was of Italian descent, his family having come from Abruzzo, and her mother was of German, English, Irish and Scottish descent; Marshall's father changed his surname from Masciarelli to Marshall before she was born. Religion played an odd role in the Marshall children's lives. Garry was christened Episcopalian, Ronny was Lutheran, and Penny was confirmed in a Congregational Church, because "[Mother] sent us anyplace that had a hall where she could put on a recital. If she hadn't needed performance space, we wouldn't have bothered."

She grew up at 3235 Grand Concourse, the Bronx, in a building which was also the childhood home of Neil Simon, Paddy Chayefsky, Calvin Klein, and Ralph Lauren. She began her career as a tap dancer at age three, and later taught tap at her mother's dance school. She graduated from Walton High School, a public girls' high school in New York and then went to University of New Mexico for two and a half years where she studied math and psychology. In 1963, while at UNM, Marshall married a football player named Michael Henry; they had a daughter, actress Tracy Reiner (née Tracy Henry). The couple divorced three years later, in 1966. During this period, Marshall worked various jobs to support herself, including as a choreographer for the Albuquerque Civic Light Opera Association. In 1967, she moved to Los Angeles to join her older brother, TV icon Garry Marshall, whose credits at the time already included TV's The Dick Van Dyke Show (1961–1966), The Joey Bishop Show (1962–1965), The Lucy Show (1964–1966) and The Tonight Show Starring Jack Parr (1960).

== Career ==
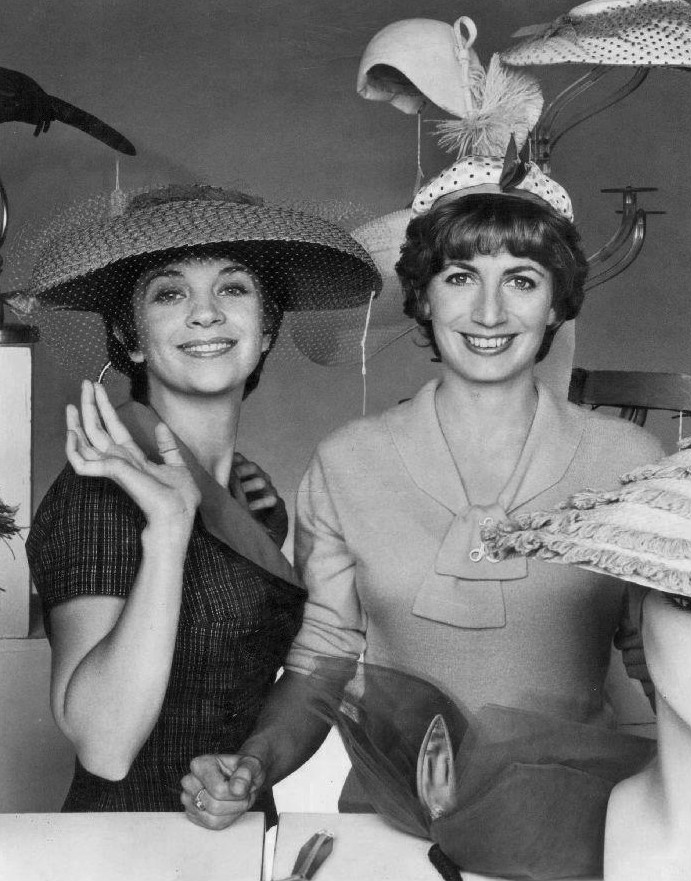
Marshall (right) with Cindy Williams in a publicity photo for Laverne & Shirley, 1976

Marshall first appeared on a television commercial for Head and Shoulders shampoo. She was hired to play a young woman who loans her Head and Shoulders shampoo to her roommate, played by Farrah Fawcett. As the crew was lighting the set, Marshall's stand-in wore a placard that read "Homely Girl" and Fawcett's stand-in wore a placard that said "Pretty Girl". Fawcett, sensing Marshall's insecurity about her looks, crossed out "Homely" on the Marshall stand-in placard and wrote "Plain".

Marshall and Billie Hayes were the only actresses to audition for the role of Witchiepoo for H.R. Pufnstuf, produced by Sid and Marty Krofft. Marshall thought that she was not right for the part, and Hayes got the role.

In 1968 Marshall accepted an offer from her brother to appear in a movie he had written and was producing, a comedy called How Sweet It Is! (1968). She landed another small role in the biker film The Savage Seven (1968), as well as a guest appearance on the hit television series That Girl, starring Marlo Thomas. Marshall was considered for the role of Gloria Bunker Stivic on All in the Family, but lost the part to Sally Struthers.

In 1970, Garry Marshall became the executive producer of the television series The Odd Couple. The following year, Marshall was added to the permanent cast to play a secretary, Myrna, and held the role for four years. In Marshall's final appearance on The Odd Couple, her character married her boyfriend, Sheldn ("they left the "o" off the birth certificate", she explains), played by Rob Reiner, her real-life husband. The episode included Marshall's real-life siblings, Garry and Ronny, as Myrna's brother and sister.

While she was on The Odd Couple, Marshall played small roles in TV movies such as Evil Roy Slade (1972), starring John Astin and Mickey Rooney (and produced by brother Garry); The Crooked Hearts (1972) starring Douglas Fairbanks Jr. and Rosalind Russell, in which she played a waitress; The Couple Takes a Wife, starring Bill Bixby; and Wacky Zoo of Morgan City (1972).

In 1974, James L. Brooks and Allan Burns cast Marshall as Janice Dreyfuss, sister-in-law to Paul Dreyfuss (played by actor Paul Sand) in the series Paul Sand in Friends and Lovers. It aired on CBS-TV Saturday nights beginning September 14, 1974. Despite good reviews and decent ratings, it was canceled mid-season. Brooks and Burns, along with studio head Grant Tinker, were so impressed with Marshall's comedic talent that the following season, they hired Marshall and actress Mary Kay Place to play Mary Richards' new neighbors (Paula and Sally Jo) on The Mary Tyler Moore Show.

Garry Marshall, creator and executive producer for Happy Days, cast Marshall and Cindy Williams to guest star on an episode of the show. The installment, titled "A Date with Fonzie", aired on November 11, 1975, and introduced the characters Laverne DeFazio and Shirley Feeney (played by Marshall and Williams, respectively) to a viewing audience. In that episode, Laverne and Shirley were a pair of wisecracking, "fast" brewery workers who were dates for Fonzie (Henry Winkler) and Richie (Ron Howard). The pair were such a hit with the studio audience that Garry Marshall decided to co-create and star them in a successful spinoff, Laverne & Shirley (1976–1983). He pitched it to Fred Silverman who ran ABC at the time and he greenlit it for a mid-season replacement. The show debuted at #1 on January 26, 1976, and soon became the highest rated TV series for the 1977–78 and 1978–79 seasons.

The characters of Laverne and Shirley appeared in five more episodes of Happy Days. In 1982, during Laverne & Shirley's eighth season, Williams left the show due to her pregnancy. Marshall soldiered on without her, calling in friends like Carrie Fisher, Laraine Newman and Angelica Huston to guest star. The show was canceled after the eighth season, the final episode aired in May 1983.

In 1983, while still filming Laverne & Shirley, Marshall resumed working with James L. Brooks when she guest starred on Taxi in a cameo appearance as herself. In the Taxi episode "Louie Moves Uptown", Marshall is turned down for residency in a new high-rise condominium in Manhattan. The Laverne & Shirley episode "Lost in Spacesuits" is referred to in the scene.

Marshall would again work with Brooks, who later became a co-producer for the animated series The Simpsons, when she lent her voice to Ms. Botz, a.k.a. Ms. Botzcowski, the "babysitter bandit," on the first produced episode of The Simpsons, making her the first official guest star to appear on the show.

Marshall also played a cameo role as herself on the HBO series Entourage. She also made a cameo appearance alongside her brother Garry in the Disney Halloween-themed movie Hocus Pocus as husband and wife. She was reunited with her Laverne & Shirley co-star, Cindy Williams, on a November 2013 episode of Sam & Cat.

=== Directing career ===
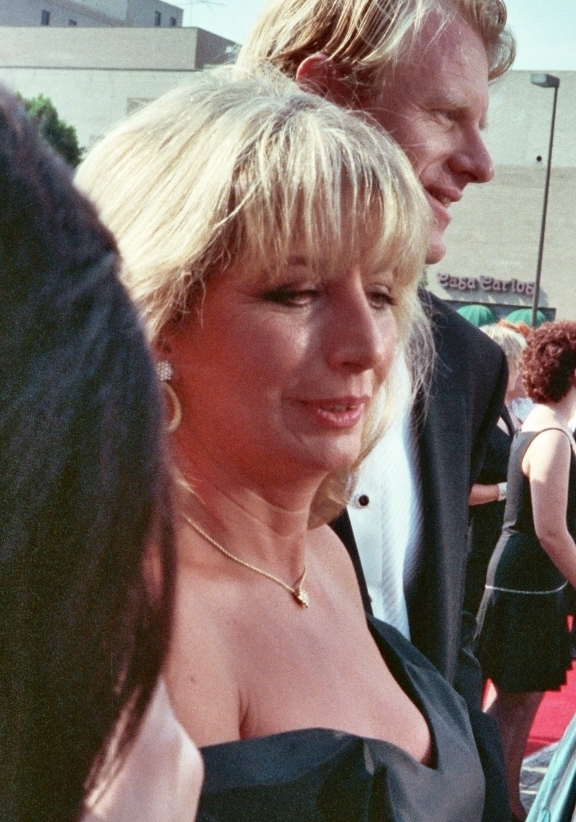
Marshall at the 1988 Emmy Awards

With the encouragement of her brother, Marshall became interested in directing. While starring on Laverne & Shirley, she began her directing career with four episodes of that show.

In 1979, she directed several episodes of the short-lived sitcom Working Stiffs, starring Michael Keaton and James Belushi. She soon moved on to theatrical films; her first film was going to be Peggy Sue Got Married (which at that point was scheduled to star Debra Winger in the leading role). Marshall and the writers of the film, however, had creative differences, and Marshall left the project, with Winger also leaving out of loyalty to Marshall.

Marshall was soon given the directorial job of the crime comedy Jumpin' Jack Flash (1986) starring Whoopi Goldberg after the original director, Howard Zieff, dropped out of the project. She brought in friends and family to help make sure it was funny: her daughter Tracy Reiner, her brother Garry Marshall, Jon Lovitz, Jim Belushi, Phil Hartman and Carol Kane. Marshall described her leap into directing feature films as very hard to learn, likening it to "cramming four years of college into one semester."

While on set all day, she spent her nights planning out the rest of the film, trying to get it finished on time. Marshall also added that Whoopi Goldberg would take her aside and calm her down if she was looking exhausted that day.

In 1999, Marshall's Parkaway Productions company was transferred from Universal to Sony. Jessica Cox was hired to run the company in 2000.

Marshall directed several blockbuster feature films in the 1980s and 90s. She broke glass ceilings and made history as the first female director to gross over US$100 million at the box office, with her body-swap rom com Big (1988), starring Tom Hanks. She also directed Awakenings (1990) starring Robin Williams and Robert De Niro, A League of Their Own (1992) with Geena Davis, Tom Hanks, Madonna and Rosie O'Donnell, and The Preacher's Wife (1996) starring Denzel Washington and Whitney Houston. A League of Their Own was her second film to gross over US$100 million at the box office. AFI included Jimmy Dugan's (Tom Hanks) line "There's no crying in baseball!" on their list of 100 Greatest Movie Quotes of All Time. In 1991, Penny was awarded the Women in Film Crystal Award.

In 1990, Jake Eberts hired her to direct Super Mario Bros. (1993), but she was replaced by Rocky Morton and Annabel Jankel after Roland Joffé replaced Eberts as producer.

In 2010 and 2011, Marshall directed two episodes of the Showtime series United States of Tara. Women in Film and Video presented her with the Women of Vision Award in 2013. Marshall planned on developing a biopic on Effa Manley, but it never materialized.

== Personal life ==
While at the University of New Mexico for two and a half years, Marshall met Michael Henry, a football player, got pregnant at 19, and left school at age twenty to marry him in 1963. They had one daughter named Tracy in 1964 (Tracy Reiner). The marriage lasted three years.

On April 10, 1971, Marshall married actor and director Rob Reiner, who later adopted Tracy. Her marriage to Reiner ended in 1981.

Following her divorce from Reiner, Marshall dated actor Larry Breeding, who had made guest appearances on Laverne & Shirley. Breeding was killed in a car accident in 1982.

Marshall had a brief relationship with singer Art Garfunkel in the mid-1980s, and he credits her with helping him through his depression.

After mostly retiring from directing, Marshall's closest friends included Beverly D'Angelo, Cynthia Hargrave, Chico Brown, and Mercedes Ganon.

In 2010, it was reported that Marshall, a very heavy smoker, had been diagnosed with lung cancer that had metastasized to her brain, but two years later she was "fine now". Following her recovery she published a memoir, My Mother Was Nuts.

== Death ==
Marshall died at her home in Los Angeles on December 17, 2018, at age 75. According to her death certificate, her death was attributed to cardiopulmonary failure, cardiac arrest and type 1 diabetes.

Marshall was cremated and her ashes are interred at Forest Lawn Memorial Park in Hollywood Hills, Los Angeles. An "L", similar to those that her Laverne character wore, is emblazoned at the bottom of her headstone.

== Awards ==
- 1978: Golden Globe Nominee—Best Performance by an Actress in a Television Series—Musical or Comedy
- 1979: Golden Globe Nominee—Best Performance by an Actress in a Television Series—Musical or Comedy
- 1980: Golden Globe Nominee—Best Actress in a Television Series—Comedy or Musical Laverne & Shirley
- 1988: Venice Film Festival Winner—Children and Cinema Award—Special Mention for Big (1988)
- 1990: Saturn Award Nominee—Best Director for film Big (1988) (Academy of Science Fiction, Fantasy and Horror Films USA)
- 1992: American Comedy Awards Winner—Lifetime Creative Achievement Award
- 1992: Hochi Film Awards Winner—Best Foreign Film for A League of Their Own
- 1994: New York Women in Film and Television Winner of Muse Award
- 1995: Flaiano International Prizes Winner—Career Award in Cinema
- 1997: Elle Women in Hollywood Awards Winner—Icon Award (shared with Meryl Streep, Jane Campion, and Laura Ziskin)
- 1998: Munich Film Festival Winner of High Hopes Award for With Friends Like These...
- 2000: Online Film & Television Association Winner—OFTA TV Hall of Fame
- 2002: Cabourg Romantic Film Festival—Golden Swann Winner for film Riding in Cars with Boys (2001)
- 2004, Star on the Walk of Fame at 7021 Hollywood Blvd.
- 2013: Society of Camera Operators Winner—Governor's Award

== Works ==
=== Central themes in Marshall's films ===
Marshall's films tend to address contemporary issues in society such as coming of age, women’s accomplishments, and oppression of the mentally disabled. For instance, the oppression of the mentally disabled is well elaborated in the film Awakenings. The film unites two big stars in a story about the plight of mentally disabled individuals and how a person who is not living with any life-threatening condition gets to learn a lesson about humanity after spending time with a mentally disabled person. Achievement of women has been elaborated well in the film A League of Their Own, a film that stars two blood sisters joining the women's baseball league during World War II. In that time, many men in professional leagues joined the armed forces. The movie exposes exciting victories and personal conflicts on the field, while, at the same time, building sisterhood and strong bonds among teammates.

=== Film ===
Year	Title	Director	Executive Producer
1986	Jumpin' Jack Flash	Yes	No
1988	Big	Yes	No
1990	Awakenings	Yes	Yes
1992	A League of Their Own	Yes	Yes
1994	Renaissance Man	Yes	Yes
1996	The Preacher's Wife	Yes	No
2001	Riding in Cars with Boys	Yes	No

Directed Academy Award performances
Under Marshall's direction, these actors have received Academy Award nominations for their performances in their respective roles.

Year	Performer	Film	Result
Academy Award for Best Actor
1988	Tom Hanks	Big	Nominated
1990	Robert De Niro	Awakenings	Nominated

Producer

- Calendar Girl (1993) (executive producer)
- Getting Away with Murder (1996)
- With Friends Like These... (1998)
- Risk (2003)
- Cinderella Man (2005)
- Bewitched (2005)

==== Acting roles ====
Year	Film	Role	Notes
1968	The Savage Seven	Tina	
1968	How Sweet It Is!	Tour Girl	
1970	The Grasshopper	Plaster Caster	
1970	Where's Poppa?	Courtroom Spectator	Uncredited
1975	How Come Nobody's on Our Side?	Theresa	aka Capers
1979	1941	Miss Fitzroy	Uncredited
1985	Movers & Shakers	Reva	Cameo
1988	She's Having a Baby	Herself	Uncredited
1991	The Hard Way	Angie	
1993	Hocus Pocus	The Master's Wife	Uncredited
1995	Get Shorty	Herself	Cameo
1998	The Emperor's New Clothes: An All-Star Illustrated Retelling of the Classic Fairy Tale	The Imperial Lady-in-Waiting #2	Voice
1999	Special Delivery		
2000	High Fidelity	Funeral Attendee	Uncredited
2004	Stateside	Lt. Chevetone	Uncredited
2005	Looking for Comedy in the Muslim World	Herself	Cameo
2007	Everybody Wants to Be Italian	Teresa the Florist	
2007	Alice Upside Down	Mrs. Plotkin	Direct-to-video film
2007	Blonde Ambition	Bolo Executive	
2011	New Year's Eve	Herself	(segment "Ahern Party")
2014	Going to America	Herself – Famous Director	
2015	Staten Island Summer	Dolores	
2015	Scooby-Doo! and Kiss: Rock and Roll Mystery	The Elder	Voice, Direct-to-video film
2016	Mother's Day	Narrator	Voice

=== Television ===
Director

Year	Title	Notes
1979	Working Stiffs	1 episode: "The Preview Presentation"
1979–1981	Laverne & Shirley	4 episodes: "Squiggy in Love", "The Duke of Squigman", "The Dating Game", "But Seriously, Folks"
1987	The Tracey Ullman Show	1 episode
1993	A League of Their Own	1 episode: "Dottie's Back"
2009	According to Jim	2 episodes: "The Yoga Bear", "Physical Therapy"
2010–2011	United States of Tara	2 episodes: "Explosive Diorama", "Wheels"

==== Acting roles ====
Year	Title	Role	Notes
1968–1969	That Girl	Assistant Librarian / Joan	Episodes: "Secret Ballot", "Fix My Screen & Bug Out"
1969	My Friend Tony	Janet	Episode: "Computer Murder"
1969	Then Came Bronson	Claire	Episode: "The Runner"
1970	Love, American Style	Mary Agnes	Episode: "Love and the Pick-Up" segment
1970	Barefoot in the Park		Episode: "In Sickness and in Health"
1970	The Wonderful World of Disney	Mayor's Secretary	Episodes: "The Wacky Zoo of Morgan City" (Parts 1 & 2)
1971	The Feminist and the Fuzz	Liberation Lady	Television film
1971	Getting Together	Mona	Episode: "Those Oldies But Goodies Remind Me of You"
1972–1974	The Odd Couple	Myrna Turner	27 episodes
1972	Evil Roy Slade	Bank Teller	Television film
1972	The Super	Janice	Episode: "The Matchmaker"
1972	The Bob Newhart Show	Stewardess	Episode: "Fly the Unfriendly Skies"
1972	The Crooked Hearts	Waitress	Television film
1972	The Couple Takes a Wife	Paula	Television film
1973	Banacek	Receptionist	Episode: "The Greatest Collection of Them All"
1974–1975	Paul Sand in Friends and Lovers	Janice Dreyfuss	14 episodes
1974–1976	The Mary Tyler Moore Show	Toni / Paula Kovacs	Episodes: "I Was a Single for WJM", "Murray in Love", "Menage-a-Lou"
1975	Let's Switch!	Alice Wright	Television film
1975	Wives	Connie	Television film
1975	Chico and the Man	Anita Cappuccino	Episode: "Chico and the Van"
1975	Saturday Night Live	Herself	Episode: "Rob Reiner"
1975–1979	Happy Days	Laverne DeFazio	5 episodes
1976	Good Heavens		Episode: "Take Me Out to the Ball Game"
1976–1983	Laverne & Shirley	Laverne DeFazio	178 episodes
1977	Saturday Night Live	Herself	Episode: "Live from Mardi Gras"
1977	Blansky's Beauties	Laverne DeFazio	Episode: "Nancy Remembers Laverne"
1978	Mork & Mindy	Laverne DeFazio	Episode: "Pilot"
1978	More Than Friends	Matty Perlman	Television film
1979	Carol Burnett & Company	Herself	Episode #1.3
1981–1982	Laverne & Shirley in the Army	Laverne DeFazio	Voice, 13 episodes
1982	Mork & Mindy/Laverne & Shirley/Fonz Hour	Laverne DeFazio	Voice, 8 episodes (Laverne & Shirley with the Fonz segment)
1983	Taxi	Herself	Episode: "Louie Moves Uptown"
1984	The New Show	Various Characters	Episode #1.4
1984	Love Thy Neighbor	Linda Wilson	Television film
1985	Challenge of a Lifetime	Nora Schoonover	Television film
1990	The Simpsons	Ms. Botz	Voice, Episode: "Some Enchanted Evening"
1993	The Odd Couple Together Again	Myrna	Television film
1996	Saturday Night Live	Various Characters	Episode: "Rosie O'Donnell/Whitney Houston"
1998	Tracey Takes On...	Herself	Episode: "Hollywood"
1998	Nash Bridges	Iris Heller	Episode: "Skin Deep"
1999	Jackie's Back!	Herself	Cameo
2004	Frasier	Celeste	Voice, Episode: "Frasier-Lite"
2006	Campus Ladies		Episode: "Webcam"
2006	Bones	Herself	Episode: "The Woman at the Airport"
2008	The Game	Doris Fox	Episode: "A Delectable Basket of Treats"
2012	The Life & Times of Tim	PR Executive	Voice, Episode: "The Smug Chiropractor/Corporate Disaster"
2012	Portlandia	Barbara	Episode: "Feminist Book Store 10th Anniversary"
2013	Sam & Cat	Sylvia Burke	Episode: "#SalmonCat"
2014	Mulaney	Tutti	Episode: "Sweet Jane"
2016	The Odd Couple	Patty	Episode: "Taffy Days"
