= The Flamingo Kid =

1984 film by Garry Marshall

- Theatrical release poster
- Directed by: Garry Marshall
- Screenplay by: Neal Marshall; Garry Marshall
- Story by: Neal Marshall
- Produced by: Michael Phillips
- Starring: Matt Dillon; Richard Crenna; Héctor Elizondo; Jessica Walter
- Cinematography: James A. Contner
- Edited by: Priscilla Nedd
- Music by: Curt Sobel
- Production companies: ABC Motion Pictures; Mercury Entertainment
- Distributed by: 20th Century Fox
- Release date: December 21, 1984
- Running time: 100 minutes
- Country: United States
- Language: English
- Budget: $10 million
- Box office: $23.9 million

The Flamingo Kid is a 1984 American romantic comedy-drama film directed by Garry Marshall and produced by Michael Phillips. It stars Matt Dillon, Richard Crenna, Héctor Elizondo, and Jessica Walter. The film follows a working-class teenage boy (Dillon) who takes a summer job at a private beach club on Long Island, where a successful car salesman (Crenna) takes him under his wing, while the boy's father (Elizondo) is concerned about him abandoning his plans to attend college.

The Flamingo Kid was the first film to receive a PG-13 rating in the United States, although it was the fifth to be released with that rating (after Red Dawn, The Woman in Red, Dreamscape, and Dune). Crenna was nominated for a Golden Globe Award for Best Supporting Actor – Motion Picture for his role, and Marisa Tomei made her big screen debut with a minor role in the film.

== Plot ==
In the summer of 1963, Jeffrey Willis, an 18-year-old from a middle-class Brooklyn family, is invited by two friends to a game of gin rummy at the El Flamingo, a private beach club in Rockaway, Queens, on the Fourth of July. While at the club, he becomes smitten with Carla Sampson, a Californian college student visiting her cousin Joyce and Joyce's nouveau riche parents, Phil and Phyllis Brody. As Jeffrey and his friends are leaving, he lands a job as a parking lot attendant after fixing the engine of a car. When Jeffrey shares the news with his family, his father Arthur, a plumber, is upset as he had arranged an office job for Jeffrey at an engineering firm.

At the El Flamingo, Jeffrey and his friends observe Phil, the reigning gin rummy champion, playing a game against Colonel Cal Eastland, who owns the club. When Carla invites Jeffrey to dinner with the Brodys, Phil takes a liking to Jeffrey over their shared interest in gin rummy and offers to arrange for him to be promoted to cabana boy. That evening, Jeffrey and Carla kiss. One day, Phil takes Jeffrey to his Long Island car dealership. Phil, who never went to college, believes that Jeffrey has potential as a salesman.

Although Jeffrey has been accepted at Pratt Institute and is on the waiting list for Columbia University, he informs his family that he has decided to skip college to pursue a job as a car salesman. Arthur berates him, insisting that his children be educated. One evening, Jeffrey and his friends lose money after betting on a horse race at Yonkers Raceway. Later at a diner, a group of young men from the racetrack start a fight with them and they are all arrested. After Arthur bails Jeffrey out of jail, Jeffrey moves out of the house.

The next day, Jeffrey tells Phil he is ready to work for him, expecting to be a car salesman. However, he is disappointed when Phil instead offers him a job as a stock boy at his Yonkers dealership. Meanwhile, Jeffrey continues dating Carla, and on the night before she leaves, they sleep together on the beach. She suggests that he visit her in California on Thanksgiving.

On Labor Day at the El Flamingo, as Phil and his team play gin rummy against Colonel Eastland and his team, Jeffrey notices that a regular onlooker, Big Sid, is feeding signals to Phil, the cause of his winning streak. When Big Sid collapses with heat stroke and injures Eastland by falling onto him, Jeffrey fills in for Eastland, opposing Phil. Jeffrey wins. Phil is initially angry but later congratulates Jeffrey and offers him a salesman job at his new dealership in Newport, California, where he can be close to Carla. Jeffrey declines and reveals that he told the others about Phil's cheating scheme.

That night, Jeffrey goes to Larry's Fish House, where his family is dining. Reconciling with Arthur, Jeffrey announces he intends to move back home and they hug.

== Cast ==
- Matt Dillon as Jeffrey Willis
- Richard Crenna as Phil Brody
- Jessica Walter as Phyllis Brody
- Héctor Elizondo as Arthur Willis
- Fisher Stevens as Hawk Ganz
- Brian McNamara as Steve Dawkins
- Carole R. Davis as Joyce Brody
- Martha Gehman as Nikki Willis
- Molly McCarthy as Ruth Willis
- Leon Robinson as Fortune Smith
- Janet Jones as Carla Samson
- Bronson Pinchot as Alfred Shultz
- Frank Campanella as Colonel Cal Eastland
- Richard Stahl as Charlie Cooper
- Joe Grifasi as Mario Minetta
- Ron McLarty as Pat McCarty
- Seth Allen as Jerry Berlin
- Irving Metzman as Big Sid
- Adam Klugman as Lewis Madrone
- Ray Roderick as Danny Walsh
- Googy Gress as Freddy
- Steven Weber as Paul Hirsch
- Eric Douglas as Donny
- Marisa Tomei as Mandy
- Tracy Reiner as Polly
- Kristina Kossi as Kristina
- Bradley Kane as Mitch
- Steve Witting (credited as Steve Whitting) as Frank
- John Turturro as Ted from Pinky's
- Novella Nelson as Lizzy, the Brodys' housekeeper

== Production ==
Cass Elliot, of the Mamas & the Papas fame, told producer and friend Michael Phillips about Neil Marshall's script, which took over ten years to finally get made into a film.

Principal photography began on August 29, 1983, in the New York City area. The Silver Gull Beach Club, located in Breezy Point, Queens, doubled as the El Flamingo Beach Club, and the Woodhaven section of Queens was used for the Willis family's Brooklyn neighborhood, with additional scenes shot in Malibu, California. Filming wrapped in mid-October 1983.

== Reception ==
=== Box office ===
The film grossed a total of $23,859,382 domestically.

=== Critical response ===
On the review aggregator website Rotten Tomatoes, 86% of 21 critics' reviews are positive, with an average rating of 6.8/10. Metacritic, which uses a weighted average, assigned the film a score of 67 out of 100, based on 12 critics, indicating "generally favorable" reviews.

Vincent Canby of The New York Times described The Flamingo Kid as "an ebullient, unsentimental Summer of '42, updated to the summer of 1963" and wrote that "even if The Flamingo Kid comes out of sit-com country, the character and the performance effortlessly rise above their origins." He also stated that "the film has the kind of slickness one expects of the most popular television fare, but it also has a bit of the satirical edge of a film like Elaine May's The Heartbreak Kid."

Rita Kempley of The Washington Post called the film "a sluggish but thoughtful comedy" and "a summer comedy that somehow sees the light on the shortest day of the year, like a much-needed Caribbean vacation." She also commented that "the performances make up for the sloppy history in the film, and it's a good-hearted and diverting story."

Paul Attanasio of The Washington Post stated that "The Flamingo Kid is filled with banal chatter about "dreams" and ends with TV-style happy-family hokum [...]. But it also has some snappy sitcom dialogue." He also wrote that "Marshall undercuts the best thing about his own movie -- its authenticity. Even at its most enjoyable, The Flamingo Kid leaves you haunted by its lack of ambition."

== Soundtrack ==
A soundtrack to the film was released by Motown.

1. Jesse Frederick – "Breakaway"
2. Martha and the Vandellas – "(Love Is Like a) Heat Wave"
3. The Chiffons – "He's So Fine"
4. Acker Bilk – "Stranger on the Shore"
5. Dion – "Runaround Sue"
6. Little Richard – "Good Golly, Miss Molly"
7. Barrett Strong – "Money (That's What I Want)"
8. The Impressions – "It's All Right"
9. Hank Ballard & the Midnighters – "Finger Poppin' Time"
10. The Chiffons – "One Fine Day"
11. The Silhouettes – "Get a Job"
12. Maureen Steele – "Boys Will Be Boys"

== Stage musical ==
A stage musical based on The Flamingo Kid is currently in development for a future Broadway production. The musical features a book and lyrics by Tony Award winner Robert L. Freedman, music by Tony Award nominee Scott Frankel, and direction by Tony Award winner Darko Tresnjak.

Following in the footsteps of Tresnjak and Freedman's Tony Award-winning A Gentleman's Guide to Love and Murder, The Flamingo Kid premiered at Hartford Stage in Hartford, Connecticut, and ran from May 9 to June 15, 2019. The cast included Jimmy Brewer as Jeffrey, Samantha Massell as Karla, Adam Heller as Arthur, Marc Kudisch as Phil Brody, Lesli Margherita as Phyllis Brody, Liz Larsen as Ruth, Lindsey Brett Carothers as Joyce, Ben Fankhauser as Steve, and Alex Wyse as Hawk. The creative team also included Denis Jones (choreographer), Bruce Coughlin (orchestrations), Alexander Dodge (scenic design), Linda Cho (costume design), Philip Rosenberg (lighting design), and Peter Hylenski (sound design).

== Remake ==
Deadline Hollywood announced in September 2012 that Walt Disney Pictures was developing a remake of The Flamingo Kid. Brett Ratner and Michael Phillips were to act as producers on the film, while music video director Nzingha Stewart was working on the script. In 2015, it was reported that ABC Studios was contemplating a half-hour television comedy series based on The Flamingo Kid, but nothing came of that either.
