= Anthony W. Marshall =

American television producer

- Born: Antonio Masciarelli; March 29, 1906; The Bronx, New York U.S.
- Died: July 12, 1999 (aged 93); Toluca Lake, Los Angeles, U.S.
- Education: New York University
- Occupation: Television producer
- Spouse: Marjorie Ward (m. 1931; died 1983)
- Children: Garry Marshall; Penny Marshall; Ronny Hallin
- Relatives: Tracy Reiner (granddaughter); Scott Marshall (grandson)

Anthony Wallace Marshall (né Antonio Masciarelli; March 29, 1906 – July 12, 1999) was an American industrial film director and television producer. He was the father of actor-director Garry Marshall, actress-director Penny Marshall, and television producer Ronny Hallin.

== Early life ==
Antonio Masciarelli was born in The Bronx, New York of Italian descent, his parents having emigrated from San Martino sulla Marrucina, Chieti, Abruzzo. He changed his name to Anthony Wallace Marshall before his son Garry was born. In 1931, he married Marjorie Ward, a tap dance teacher who ran her own dance school.

== Career ==
Marshall graduated from New York University and began his career as a director of industrial films and was a producer on his son Garry Marshall's television series, The Odd Couple. Later in his career, he produced for other television sitcoms, including, Laverne & Shirley, Happy Days, Mork & Mindy, Who's Watching the Kids? and The New Odd Couple. He was also nominated for two Primetime Emmy Awards in the category Outstanding Comedy Series.

== Death ==
Marshall died on July 1, 1999 of natural causes at his home in Toluca Lake, Los Angeles, at the age of 93.
