= Scott Marshall (director) =

American film director (born 1969)

- Born: Scott Anthony Marshall; January 17, 1969 (age 57); Los Angeles, California, U.S.
- Other name: Scott Marshal
- Occupation: Film director
- Years active: 1974–present
- Spouse: Elissa Spivak (m. 2001)
- Children: 3
- Father: Garry Marshall
- Relatives: Anthony W. Marshall (grandfather); Ronny Hallin (aunt); Penny Marshall (aunt); Tracy Reiner (cousin)

Scott Marshall (born January 17, 1969) is an American film director and musician. He is a co-founder and the bass guitarist for the alternative rock band Chavez and directed films such as Keeping Up with the Steins (2006) and Blonde Ambition (2007).

== Early life ==
Marshall was born and raised in Los Angeles, California, the son of Barbara (née Wells), a nurse, and Garry Marshall; he is also the nephew of Penny Marshall. Scott had an interest in film since his childhood as his father recalled of his son's early efforts in film, "I'd make him a little wooden airplane and he would take it immediately and burn it, and start to film it, flaming, crashing!". Also, "Later, we got a pool and he would get his friends to drink tomato juice and then he'd shoot at them and they would dive in the pool and the tomato juice would come out. It ruined the pool."

== Career ==
Marshall studied film directing at the AFI Conservatory where he directed his short film Waving Not Drowning. It later screened at the AFI/Los Angeles Film Festival. He also directed the movie Blonde Ambition, which is considered a cult film by some for its writing.

He also played bass guitar in Chavez.

== Personal life ==
Marshall married his wife Elissa Spivak in 2001. Together they have three children: Sam, Ethan, and Emma.

== Director ==
- Keeping Up with the Steins (2006)
- Blonde Ambition (2007)
- All's Faire in Love (2009)

== Second unit director ==
(all with father Garry, except where noted)

- The Princess Diaries 2: Royal Engagement
- The Princess Diaries
- Runaway Bride
- Dear God
- The Preacher's Wife (with Penny Marshall)
- Raising Helen
- The Other Sister
- Mother's Day

== Actor ==
- Mother's Day as Sam
