= Garry Marshall =

American filmmaker (1934–2016)

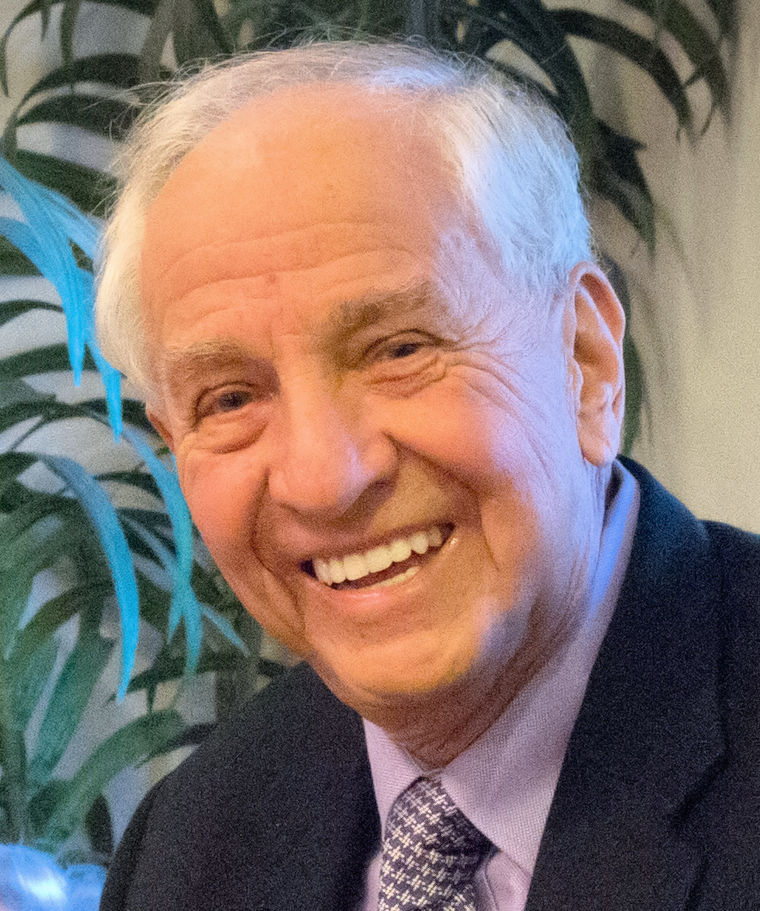
- Marshall in 2013
- Born: Garry Kent Marshall; November 13, 1934; Manhattan, New York, U.S.
- Died: July 19, 2016 (aged 81); Burbank, California, U.S.
- Resting place: Forest Lawn Memorial Park Cemetery, Los Angeles, California, U.S.
- Education: Northwestern University
- Occupations: Screenwriter; director; producer; actor
- Years active: 1959–2016
- Known for: Creator of Happy Days
- Spouse: Barbara Sue Wells (m. 1963)
- Children: 3, including Scott Marshall
- Father: Anthony W. Marshall
- Relatives: Penny Marshall (sister); Ronny Hallin (sister); Tracy Reiner (niece)

Garry Kent Marshall (November 13, 1934 – July 19, 2016) was an American screenwriter, director, producer and actor. Marshall began his career in the 1960s as a writer for The Lucy Show and The Dick Van Dyke Show until he developed the television adaptation of Neil Simon's play The Odd Couple. He rose to fame in the 1970s for creating the ABC sitcom Happy Days (1974–1984).

Marshall went on to direct numerous films including Young Doctors in Love (1982), The Flamingo Kid (1984), Nothing in Common (1986), Overboard (1987), Beaches (1988), Pretty Woman (1990), Frankie & Johnny (1991), Exit to Eden (1994), Dear God (1996), The Other Sister and Runaway Bride (both in 1999), The Princess Diaries (2001), Raising Helen (2004), Georgia Rule (2007), Valentine's Day (2010), New Year's Eve (2011), and Mother's Day (2016).

As an actor, Marshall appeared in the films Lost in America (1985), Soapdish (1991), A League of Their Own (1992), Hocus Pocus (1993) along with his sister Penny Marshall, With Friends Like These... (1998), Orange County (2002), Chicken Little (2005), Keeping Up with the Steins (2006), Race to Witch Mountain (2009), and Life After Beth (2014). On television, Marshall had a recurring role on the sitcom Murphy Brown (1997-1999) as fictional network boss Stan Lansing.

== Early life and family ==
Garry Kent Marshall was born in New York City on November 13, 1934, the only son and the eldest child of Anthony Masciarelli (later Anthony Wallace Marshall; 1906–1999), a director of industrial films and producer, and Marjorie Irene (née Ward; 1908–1983), the owner and teacher in a tap dance school. He was the elder brother of actress-director Penny Marshall and actress-producer Ronny Hallin. His father was of Italian descent, his family having come from San Martino sulla Marrucina, Chieti, Abruzzo, and his mother was of German, English, Irish and Scottish ancestry. His father changed his surname from Masciarelli to Marshall before Garry was born. Garry Marshall was baptized Presbyterian and also raised Lutheran for a time.

He attended De Witt Clinton High School and Northwestern University, where he wrote a sports column for The Daily Northwestern, and was a member of the Alpha Tau Omega fraternity.

Beginning in 1956, Marshall served a stint in the U.S. Army as a writer for Stars and Stripes and Seoul News, and was production chief for Armed Forces Radio Network; serving in Korea.

On March 9, 1963, Marshall married Barbara Sue Wells. They resided in Los Angeles; the couple have three children: Scott; Lori (with whom he co-wrote a book); and Kathleen (who appeared in all of his films).

== Career ==
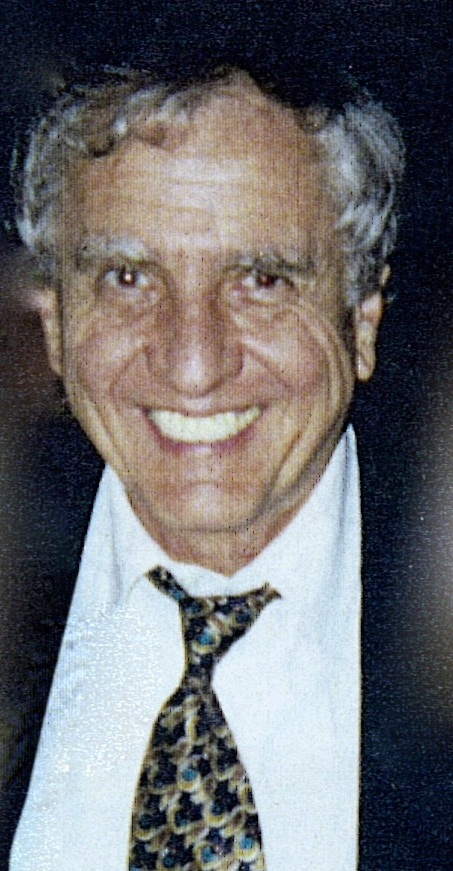
Marshall c. 1995

Marshall began his career as a joke writer for such comedians as Joey Bishop and Phil Foster and became a writer for The Tonight Show with Jack Paar. He originally partnered with writer Fred Freeman.

In 1961, he and Freeman moved to Hollywood, where they broke into writing sitcoms on The Joey Bishop Show. Freeman, however, found that he did not enjoy sitcom work, and moved back to New York. Marshall began collaborating with writer Jerry Belson, and the two worked together through the 1960s. The pair worked on The Dick Van Dyke Show, The Joey Bishop Show, The Danny Thomas Show, and The Lucy Show. Their first television series as creator-producers was Hey, Landlord, which lasted one season (1966–67). Then they adapted Neil Simon's play The Odd Couple for television. He also wrote and produced the features How Sweet It Is and The Grasshopper.

Moving into the 1970s, Marshall worked on his own or with others, and created Happy Days, Laverne & Shirley (starring his sister Penny, who had earlier had a recurring role on The Odd Couple), and Mork & Mindy, which were produced by his associates Thomas L. Miller, Robert L. Boyett, and Edward K. Milkis. He was also a co-creator of Makin' It, which the three men also produced.

In the early 1980s, he met Héctor Elizondo while playing basketball, and they became great friends. Elizondo appeared in every film that Marshall directed, beginning with his first feature film Young Doctors in Love. Elizondo once noted that he is written into all of Marshall's contracts whether he wanted to do the film or not. In the opening credits of Exit to Eden, their eighth film together, Elizondo is credited "As Usual ... Hector Elizondo". In 1984, Marshall had a film hit as the writer and director of The Flamingo Kid. Of all Marshall's films, Elizondo had his biggest role in The Flamingo Kid as main character Matt Dillon's father.

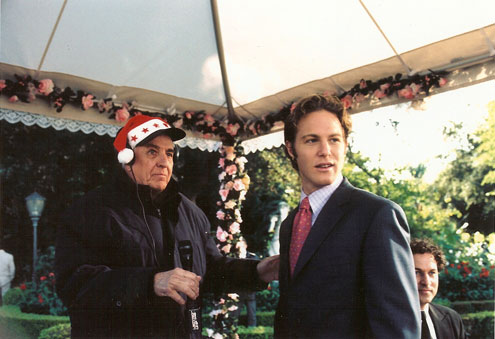
Marshall and Jonny Blu on the set of The Princess Diaries 2: Royal Engagement in 2004

Marshall had several responsibilities during this period of his career: most of his hit television series were created and executive produced by him. His first producing assignment came with Hey, Landlord in 1966. He stepped up the next year, producing The Lucy Show. Then came successes in producing The Odd Couple, Laverne & Shirley, Blansky's Beauties, Mork & Mindy, Angie, and Happy Days.

One such project titled Four Stars was directed by Lynda Goodfriend (who portrayed Lori Beth in Happy Days), and was based on a play Goodfriend had read when she was studying at the Lee Strasberg Center, which had been written by John Schulte and Kevin Mahoney. It starred Julie Paris (the daughter of Jerry Paris) and Bert Kramer. Schulte later co-wrote with TV veteran writer and producer Fred Fox Jr., who penned and produced a number of Marshall's television series, including Happy Days and Laverne & Shirley. Marshall went on to focus on directing feature films, with a series of hits, such as Beaches (1988), Pretty Woman (1990), Runaway Bride (1999), The Princess Diaries (2001), The Princess Diaries 2: Royal Engagement (2004), Valentine's Day (2010), and New Year's Eve (2011). Other films he directed included Nothing in Common (1986), Overboard (1987), Frankie & Johnny (1991), Dear God (1996), The Other Sister (1999), Raising Helen (2004), Georgia Rule (2007), and Mother's Day (2016).

Marshall was also an actor, appearing in television series such as Murphy Brown and On the Lot, and in such films as Albert Brooks' Lost in America (1985), his sister Penny Marshall's Jumpin' Jack Flash (1986), Soapdish (1991), his sister's A League of Their Own (1992), Hocus Pocus (1993) along with his sister, With Friends Like These... (1998), Orange County (2002), Keeping Up with the Steins (2006), Race to Witch Mountain (2009), and Life After Beth (2014). His voice acting included a guest-starring voice for The Simpsons episodes "Eight Misbehavin'" and "Homer the Father" (one of his first roles as an undercover cop in the counter-culture drama Psych-Out starring Jack Nicholson), as well as voice roles in the animated films The Majestic (2001) and Chicken Little (2005). He appeared in two episodes of Happy Days as a drummer. He was a drummer in the second-to-last scene of The Princess Diaries 2: Royal Engagement and he played a drummer in his film Overboard.

His theater credits included Wrong Turn at Lungfish, which he wrote in collaboration with Lowell Ganz, The Roast with Jerry Belson, Shelves and Happy Days: A New Musical with Paul Williams, which had its premiere at the Falcon Theater in Burbank, California, February 24, 2006. He portrayed the role of "director" on Burbank's "Lights... camera... action!" float in the 2014 Rose Parade. In 2014, Marshall appeared in a guest star role in a February episode in season 11 of Two and a Half Men.

== Death and tributes ==
Marshall died at a hospital in Burbank, California, on the morning of July 19, 2016, due to complications of pneumonia after suffering a stroke. He was 81.

Marshall was cremated at Forest Lawn - Hollywood Hills Cemetery in its crematory alongside his sister upon her death in 2018. His memorial tribute was held at California State University, Northridge's Younes and Soraya Nazarian Performing Center for the Performing Arts on November 13, 2016.

Henry Winkler paid tribute to him on Barry in 2019, and SAG-AFTRA made a Memoriam Tribute to Marshall on the SAG Awards in 2019. Julia Roberts paid tribute to him in Pretty Woman: The Musical in 2018. She also paid tribute to him in an interview: "To know Garry Marshall was to love him. And I was luckier than most to have loved him for my entire adult life and luckier still to have been loved by him because his love was unconditional, inexhaustible and magical."

ABC aired the special The Happy Days of Garry Marshall on May 12, 2020.

== Filmography ==
=== Film ===
Year	Title	Director	Producer	Writer
1968	How Sweet It Is!	No	Yes	Yes
1970	The Grasshopper	No	Yes	Yes
1982	Young Doctors in Love	Yes	No	No
1984	The Flamingo Kid	Yes	No	Yes
1986	Nothing in Common	Yes	No	Uncredited
1987	Overboard	Yes	No	No
1988	Beaches	Yes	No	No
1989	The Lottery (Short film)	Yes	No	No
1990	Pretty Woman	Yes	No	No
1991	Frankie & Johnny	Yes	Yes	No
1994	Exit to Eden	Yes	Yes	No
1996	Dear God	Yes	No	No
1999	The Other Sister	Yes	No	Yes
1999	Runaway Bride	Yes	No	No
2001	The Princess Diaries	Yes	No	No
2004	Raising Helen	Yes	No	No
2004	The Princess Diaries 2: Royal Engagement	Yes	No	No
2007	Georgia Rule	Yes	No	No
2010	Valentine's Day	Yes	No	No
2011	New Year's Eve	Yes	Yes	No
2016	Mother's Day	Yes	No	Story

Executive producer

- Walkin' Walter (1977)
- The Twilight of the Golds (1996)

==== Acting roles ====
Year	Title	Role	Notes
1961	The Phony American	U.S. Recruiting Officer	
1968	Maryjane	Service Station Attendant	Credited as Garry K. Marshall
1968	Psych-Out	Plainclothesman	Credited as Garry K. Marshall
1968	How Sweet It Is!	Man in top bunk	Voice, Uncredited
1977	Grand Theft Auto	Underworld Boss	Credited as Gary K. Marshall
1985	Lost in America	Casino Manager	Credited as Gary K. Marshall
1986	Jumpin' Jack Flash	Police Detective	Credited as Gary K. Marshall
1987	Overboard	Drummer	Uncredited
1988	Beaches	Audition Director	Uncredited
1990	Pretty Woman	Bum Tour Guide	Uncredited
1990	Secret Agent OO Soul	—N/a	
1991	Soapdish	Edmund Edwards	
1992	A League of Their Own	Walter Harvey	
1993	Hocus Pocus	Devil (Husband)	Uncredited
1994	Exit to Eden	Priscilla's Client	Voice, Uncredited
1995	Live Nude Girls	Mobster Don	Uncredited
1995	Statistically Speaking	—N/a	Short
1996	Mary Jane's Not a Virgin Anymore	Complaining Customer	
1996	Dear God	Preston Sweeney, Postmaster	Uncredited
1996	The Twilight of the Golds	Walter Gold	
1998	With Friends Like These...	Frank Minetti	
1998	Hole in the Paper Sky	Warren	Short
1999	Runaway Bride	First Baseman in Softball	Uncredited
1999	Kismet	Stepfather	Short
1999	Never Been Kissed	Rigfort	
1999	The Space Between Us	Steve Mayland	
1999	Can't Be Heaven	Pawn Shop Broker	
2000	It's a Shame About Ray	Mr. Brezhnev	Short
2001	Tomcats	Uncle Murray	Uncredited
2001	The Hollywood Sign	Director	
2001	The Majestic	Studio Executive	Voice
2002	Orange County	Arthur Gantner	
2002	Mother Ghost	Arthur	
2003	The Long Ride Home	Arthur	
2003	They Call Him Sasquatch	Stu Glassman	
2003	Devil's Knight	Big Eddie	
2004	The Princess Diaries 2: Royal Engagement	Drummer	
2005	Mute	Pastor	Short
2005	Chicken Little	Buck Cluck	Voice
2006	Keeping Up with the Steins	Irwin Fiedler	
2006	I-See-You.Com	Himself	
2008	Chronic Town	The Doctor	
2009	Finding Bliss	Himself	
2009	Race to Witch Mountain	Dr. Donald Harlan	
2009	Grand Drip	Larry Rosenberg	Short
2010	Valentine's Day	Musician	Uncredited
2014	Life After Beth	Grandpa	
2015	Scooby-Doo! And Kiss: Rock and Roll Mystery	Manny Goldman	Voice, Direct-to-DVD

=== Television ===
Year	Title	Director	Producer	Writer	Creator	Notes
1960	The Jack Paar Tonight Show	No	No	Yes	No	3 episodes
1962–1965	The Joey Bishop Show	No	No	Yes	No	12 episodes
1963–1964	Make Room for Daddy	No	No	Yes	No	5 episodes
1964	The Bill Dana Show	No	No	Yes	No	2 episodes
1964	Bob Hope Presents the Chrysler Theatre	No	No	Yes	No	Episode: "Think Pretty"
1964	Gomer Pyle, U.S.M.C.	No	No	Yes	No	2 episodes
1964	Danny Thomas Special	No	No	Yes	No	TV Special
1964–1966	The Lucy Show	No	No	Yes	No	11 episodes
1965	Hank	No	No	Yes	No	Episode: "Will the Real Harvey Wheatley Pleas Stand Up?"
1965	I Spy	No	No	Yes	No	Episode: "No Exchange on Damaged Merchandise"
1965–1966	The Dick Van Dyke Show	No	No	Yes	No	18 episodes
1966–1967	Hey, Landlord	Yes	Yes	Yes	Yes	Episode "Czech Your Wife, Sir?"
1967–1968	The Danny Thomas Hour	No	Yes	Yes	No	Episode: "My Pal Tony"
1968	Dick Van Dyke	No	Yes	No	No	TV special
1970	Barefoot in the Park	No	No	Yes	No	Episode: "The Bed"
1970–1971	Love, American Style	No	No	Yes	No	19 episodes
1970–1975	The Odd Couple	Yes	No	Yes	No	Director: (6 episodes); Writer: (7 episodes)
1972	Me and the Chimp	Yes	Executive	Yes	Yes	13 episodes
1972–1974	The Brian Keith Show	No	Executive	Yes	Yes	
1974–1984	Happy Days	Yes	Executive	Yes	Yes	Director: Episode: "Haunted"; Writer: (2 episodes)
1976–1983	Laverne & Shirley	Yes	Executive	Yes	Yes	Director: Episode: "The Society Party"
1977	Blansky's Beauties	Yes	Executive	Yes	Yes	Director: Episode: "Blansky's Biking Beauty"
1978–1982	Mork & Mindy	Yes	Executive	Yes	Yes	Director: Episode: "Dueling Skates"
1978–1979	Who's Watching the Kids?	No	Executive	No	No	10 episodes
1979–1980	Angie	No	Yes	Yes	Yes	
1981	Mean Jeans	Yes	Executive	No	No	
1982–1983	The New Odd Couple	No	Executive	Yes	No	Also developer
1982–1983	Joanie Loves Chachi	No	Executive	Yes	Yes	3 episodes
1983	Laverne & Shirley	Yes	No	No	No	Episode: "The Monastery Show"
1987	Nothing in Common	No	Yes	No	Yes	Based on his 1986 film
2014	See Dad Run	No	No	Yes	No	Episode: "See Dad See Joe Sleepwalk"

Executive consultant

- The Odd Couple (2015–2016)
- Grandfathered (2015–2016)

TV movies

Year	Title	Director	Producer	Writer
1967	Sheriff Who	No	Yes	No
1970	The Murdocks and the McClays	No	Yes	Yes
1972	Evil Roy Slade	No	No	Yes
1972	Wednesday Night Out	No	No	Yes
1974	Dominic's Dream	Yes	Yes	Yes
1975	Wives	No	Executive	Yes
1979	Beane's of Boston	No	Executive	No
1983	Herndon	Yes	Executive	No
1986	Four Stars	No	Executive	No
1989	Let's Get Mom	Yes	No	No

==== Acting roles ====
Year	Title	Role	Notes
1965–1966	The Dick Van Dyke Show	Referee, Bartender	Episodes "Body and Sol" and "The Gunslinger"
1966–1967	Hey, Landlord	Big Leonard	Episode: "A Legend Dies"
1967	Good Morning World	Man	Episode: "Now I Lay Me Down to Sleep, Maybe"
1970–1975	The Odd Couple	Man #2 / Werner Turner / Drummer / Man #1	4 episodes
1974–1984	Happy Days	Prom Drummer/Drummer	2 episodes
1976–1983	Laverne & Shirley	Drummer	2 episodes
1980	Vega$	Dr. Middleton	Episode: "Lost Monday"
1981	The Way We Were	Himself	TV special
1987–1988	The New Hollywood Squares	Himself (Panelist)	Recurring role (5 episodes)
1992	Street Scenes: New York on Film	Himself	Documentary film
1993	A League of Their Own	Walter Harvey	2 episodes
1993	The Last Shot	Mark Tullis Sr.	TV short
1994–1997	Murphy Brown	Mr. Stan Lansing	Recurring role (24 episodes)
1995	Night Stand	Garry Marshall	Episode: "Arctic Heat"
1995	Wheel of Fortune	Himself (Celebrity Contestant)	Episode: "Celebrity Award Winners (Game 3)"
1995	The Laverne & Shirley Reunion	Himself	TV special
1997	Pinky and the Brain	Mr. Itch – The Devil	Voice, Episode: "A Pinky and the Brain Halloween"
1997	The Naked Truth	Garry Marshall	Episode: "Brideface Revisited"
1997	City Guys	Mr. Giordano	Episode: "Bye Mom"
1998	CHiPs '99	Tour Bus Driver	TV movie
1999	Norm	Big Nick	Episode: "Norm vs. Norm"
1999	The Simpsons	Mr Larry Kidkill	Voice, Episode: "Eight Misbehavin"
1999	Jeopardy!	Himself (Celebrity Contestant)	Episode: "A Celebrity Jeopardy! (Game 5)"
2000	MADtv	Himself	Episode: "#5.23"
2001	Hollywood Squares	Himself (Panelist)	Recurring role (5 episodes)
2001–2002	Three Sisters	Vince	2 episodes
2002	Monk	Warren Beach	Episode: "Mr. Monk and the Airplane"
2002	Rugrats	Fred	Voice, Episode: "Club Fred"
2002	Sabrina, the Teenage Witch	Mickey Brentwood	Episode: "Bada-Ping!"
2004	Listen Up	Max Kleinman	Episode: "The Gift of the Ton-I"
2004	Father of the Pride	Bernie	Voice, recurring role (5 episodes)
2004–2008	Biography	Himself (Interviewee)	5 episodes
2007	Brothers & Sisters	Major Jack Wiener	2 episodes
2008	The Sarah Silverman Program	Sharkcorp President	Episode: "High, It's Sarah"
2009	ER	Harry Feingold	Episode: "Love Is a Battlefield"
2009	According to Jim	Doctor	Episode: "Physical Therapy"
2011	The Simpsons	Sheldon Leavitt	Voice, Episode: "Homer the Father"
2011–2013	The Looney Tunes Show	Dr. Weisberg	Voice, recurring role (9 episodes)
2012	Louie	Lars Tardigan	2 episodes
2013	See Dad Run	Bernie	Episode: "See Dad Run See Dad Run"
2014	Two and a Half Men	Garry	Episode: "Bite Me, Supreme Court"
2014	Liv and Maddie	Vic Defazerelli	Episode: "Space Werewolf-A-Rooney"
2015	Brooklyn Nine-Nine	Marvin Miller	Episode: "The Wednesday Incident"
2015	Hot in Cleveland	Ari	Episode: "All Dolled Up"
2015	BoJack Horseman	Abe	Voice, Episode: "Yes And"
2015	Penn Zero: Part-Time Hero	Soda Jerk	Voice, 2 episodes
2015	Celebrity Family Feud	Himself (Celebrity Contestant)	Episode: "Dr. Phil McGraw vs. Garry & Penny Marshall"
2016	The Odd Couple	Walter Madison	Episode: "Madison & Son", (final appearance)

=== Video games ===
Year	Title	Role	Notes
2005	Chicken Little	Buck Cluck	Voice

== Awards and nominations ==
In 1996, Marshall was awarded the Women in Film Lucy Award in recognition of excellence and innovation in creative works that have enhanced the perception of women through the medium of television. He was inducted into the Television Hall of Fame for his contributions to the field of television in 1997.

In 2012, he was inducted into the National Association of Broadcasters' Broadcasting Hall of Fame.

Marshall received the Valentine Davies Award (1995) and Laurel Award for TV Writing Achievement (2014) from the Writers Guild of America.

Association	Year	Category	Title	Result
Alliance of Women Film Journalists Awards	2011	Hall of Shame	Valentine's Day	Nominated
American Cinema Editors	2004	Golden Eddie Filmmaker of the Year Award	—	Won
American Comedy Awards	1990	Creative Achievement Award	—	Won
BAFTA Awards	1991	Best Film	Pretty Woman	Nominated
Casting Society of America	1995	Lifetime Achievement Award	—	Won
Cesar Awards	1991	Best Foreign Film	Pretty Woman	Nominated
Gold Derby Awards	2008	Lifetime Achievement Award	—	Nominated
Gold Derby Awards	2010	Lifetime Achievement Award	—	Nominated
Golden Raspberry Awards	2012	Worst Director	New Year's Eve	Nominated
Primetime Emmy Awards	1971	Outstanding New Series	The Odd Couple	Nominated
Primetime Emmy Awards	1971	Outstanding Comedy Series	The Odd Couple	Nominated
Primetime Emmy Awards	1972	Outstanding Comedy Series	The Odd Couple	Nominated
Primetime Emmy Awards	1974	Outstanding Comedy Series	The Odd Couple	Nominated
Primetime Emmy Awards	1979	Outstanding Comedy Series	Mork & Mindy	Nominated
PRISM Awards	2008	Best Feature Film	Georgia Rule	Won
Producers Guild Awards	1998	Lifetime Achievement Membership Award	—	Won
Producers Guild Awards	1998	Lifetime Achievement Award in Television	—	Won
Publicists Guild of America	1980	Showmanship Award – Television	—	Won
Publicists Guild of America	1992	Showmanship Award – Motion Picture	—	Won
TV Land Awards	2008	Legend Award	—	Won
Walk of Fame	1983	Star on the Walk of Fame — Television 6838 Hollywood, Blvd.	—	Won
Women in Film Crystal + Lucy Awards	1996	Lucy Award	—	Won
Writers Guild of America	1965	Episodic Comedy (for "The Bowling Partners")	Make Room for Daddy	Nominated
Writers Guild of America	1966	Episodic Comedy (for "Romance, Roses and Rye Bread", "4 1/2")	The Dick Van Dyke Show	Nominated
Writers Guild of America	1995	Valentine Davies Award	—	Won
Writers Guild of America	2014	Laurel Award for TV Writing Achievement	—	Won

Accolades for Marshall's directed films
Year	Title	Academy Awards		BAFTAs		Golden Globes	
Year	Title	Nominations	Wins	Nominations	Wins	Nominations	Wins
1984	The Flamingo Kid					1	
1988	Beaches	1					
1990	Pretty Woman	1		4		4	1
1991	Frankie and Johnny			1	1	1	
Total		2		5	1	6	1
