= Jumpin' Jack Flash (film) =

1986 spy comedy film directed by Penny Marshall

- Theatrical release poster
- Directed by: Penny Marshall
- Screenplay by: David H. Franzoni; J. W. Melville; Patricia Irving; Christopher Thompson
- Story by: David H. Franzoni
- Produced by: Lawrence Gordon; Joel Silver
- Starring: Whoopi Goldberg
- Cinematography: Matthew F. Leonetti
- Edited by: Mark Goldblatt
- Music by: Thomas Newman
- Production companies: Lawrence Gordon Productions; Silver Pictures
- Distributed by: 20th Century Fox
- Release date: October 10, 1986
- Running time: 100 minutes
- Country: United States
- Language: English
- Budget: $18 million
- Box office: $29.8 million

Jumpin' Jack Flash is a 1986 American spy comedy film starring Whoopi Goldberg. The film was directed by Penny Marshall in her theatrical film directorial debut. The soundtrack has two versions of the song "Jumpin' Jack Flash": the original by the Rolling Stones, and a cover by Aretha Franklin in the end credits. Franklin's version was not on the film's soundtrack album, but was released as a single.

== Plot ==
In New York City, Terry Doolittle is an eccentric but talented and affable computer operator at First National Bank. She regularly uses her work computer to communicate remotely with and advise people around the world. Late one night, Terry receives a message from "Jumping Jack Flash", who claims to be a British Intelligence agent trapped in Eastern Europe and pursued by the KGB. Unable to contact his superiors, Jack asks Terry for help after she demonstrates her intelligence by cracking his encryption password, based on their shared fondness for The Rolling Stones. He asks her to deliver a coded message to Department C at the British consulate, but a staff member, Jeremy Talbot, claims that no such department exists.

A computer technician later arrives at First National to inspect Terry's computer, but disappears when she calls security to confirm who sent him. Jack then asks Terry to retrieve a frying pan from his apartment, on which he has concealed contact information for fellow agents Mark Van Meter, Peter Caen, Archer Lincoln, and Harry Carlson. While there, someone photographs Terry and pins the image to Jack's door to intimidate her. When she returns to her taxi, the technician takes her hostage, but she strikes him with the pan and escapes from the vehicle. Terry is able to contact only Van Meter, who agrees to meet her by the East River. They are ambushed, however, and Van Meter is shot dead after pushing Terry into the river to save her. At his funeral, Terry encounters an unhelpful Lincoln and Carlson's wife, Liz, who believes that Harry is with Jack.

Terry contacts Jack, who deduces that Harry must have died after they became separated. Jack then asks her to undertake a dangerous mission by breaking into the consulate and accessing its computer system during the Queen's anniversary ball. Terry infiltrates the event disguised as a singer, while Liz distracts Talbot while Terry connects a device to the computer, allowing her to access it remotely. The following night, Terry uses the device to access the consulate's computer system and arrange an escape route for Jack, but Talbot disables it before she can finish. She visits Liz's home for advice, only to find it abandoned and Lincoln waiting for her. He confirms that Harry is dead and that his family has been relocated and given new identities for their protection.

The following morning, Terry persuades Jack's former girlfriend, Lady Sarah Billings, now the wife of the consul general, to arrange a new escape route for him. Terry is later abducted on the city streets by the technician and his accomplices, but incapacitates him and escapes. She transmits the new plan to Jack before being recaptured by Talbot and his men. Terry deduces that Talbot is a KGB mole who wants Jack dead because Jack discovered the truth and has been framed for Talbot's crimes. The escape route Sarah supplied was provided by Talbot in his capacity as a trusted consular adviser and will lead Jack into a trap. Terry bluffs that she gave Jack a different route, preventing Talbot from killing her immediately, and escapes to the office to warn him.

Talbot and his men storm the office, forcing Terry's co-workers to take cover, but her new colleague Marty shoots the attackers dead while Terry incapacitates Talbot. Marty reveals that he is actually Peter Caen and provides Jack with a safe escape route. Before losing contact with Jack, Terry reminds him of their planned date.

Terry waits for Jack at a restaurant, but Peter arrives instead and tells her that Jack is stranded in England. Sometime later, Terry has been promoted to oversee the office, but remains saddened that Jack failed to meet her. She receives a new series of messages from him revealing that he can see her, and turns to meet him for the first time. Jack invites her to dinner.

== Cast ==
- Whoopi Goldberg as Teresa "Terry" Doolittle, a well-liked bank employee with a wry attitude toward life
- Stephen Collins as Marty Phillips, a new employee at First National Bank
- John Wood as Jeremy Talbot, a worker at the British Consulate in New York City
- Carol Kane as Cynthia, a co-worker and friend of Terry's at First National Bank
- Annie Potts as Liz Carlson, another CIA agent and longtime friend of Jack
- Peter Michael Goetz as Mr. Page, the manager of First National Bank and Terry's boss
- Roscoe Lee Browne as Archer Lincoln
- Sara Botsford as Lady Sarah Billings, one of Jack's former romantic contacts
- Jeroen Krabbé as Mark Van Meter
- Vyto Ruginis as Carl, KGB agent
- Jonathan Pryce as "Jumping Jack Flash", a DIS agent trapped in an unnamed Eastern Bloc country
- Teagan Clive as Russian Exercise Woman

In addition, a number of then current and future players from Saturday Night Live appeared in smaller roles, including Jon Lovitz, Phil Hartman (credited as Phil E. Hartmann), Jim Belushi and Michael McKean. Tracey Ullman appears in a cameo role, and the director's daughter, Tracy Reiner, plays a secretary. Comedian Sam Kinison, who was dating director Penny Marshall at the time, was offered the role of Jack, but Whoopi Goldberg nixed the deal, causing Marshall and Kinison to end their relationship and starting a bitter feud between Kinison and Goldberg.

== Production ==
The film was produced by Lawrence Gordon under the production companies Lawrence Gordon Productions and Twentieth Century Fox.

Production of the film, originally conceived as a vehicle for Shelley Long, was problematic. The script was troubled and often was rewritten on the set.

Principal photography for Jumpin' Jack Flash began on November 11, 1985, in New York City. Various locations in the city, including the Statue of Liberty and Central Park, were used to depict the film's different settings.

After just ten days of filming in New York City, production was shut down and moved to Hollywood, due to creative differences between the studio and director Howard Zieff, who left the project, as did producer Marvin Worth. It remains uncertain whether the footage shot in New York City prior to the production shutdown was incorporated into the final version of the film.

Penny Marshall replaced Zieff as director, and Joel Silver also came in as producer.

Upon assuming the directorial duties, Marshall called in Marty Kurzfeld and Christopher Thompson to further rework the screenplay.

== Soundtrack ==
The soundtrack album was released on LP and cassette by Mercury Records, and later reissued on compact disc by Spectrum.

1. "Set Me Free" - René & Angela (4:23)
2. "A Trick of the Night" - Bananarama (4:37)
3. "Misled" - Kool & the Gang (4:21)
4. "Rescue Me" - Gwen Guthrie (4:32)
5. "Hold On" - Billy Branigan (4:04)
6. "Jumpin' Jack Flash" - The Rolling Stones (3:37)
7. "Window to the World" - Face to Face (3:21)
8. "You Can't Hurry Love" - The Supremes (2:44)
9. "Breaking the Code" - Thomas Newman (3:41)
10. "Love Music" - Thomas Newman (2:47)

The original versions of "Set Me Free" (by the Pointer Sisters) and "Rescue Me" (by Fontella Bass) are heard in the film, rather than the covers on the soundtrack album.

== Reception ==
Jumpin' Jack Flash received generally negative reviews from critics upon its release. Roger Ebert of the Chicago Sun-Times praised Goldberg's performance but felt that she was harnessed to "an exhausted screenplay—an anthology of old ideas and worn-out clichés." Vincent Canby of The New York Times blamed the failures of the film on its director, stating "Miss Marshall directs Jumpin' Jack Flash as if she were more worried about the decor than the effect of the performance." On Rotten Tomatoes, it has an approval rating of 33% based on reviews from 24 critics, with an average rating of 4.2/10. On Metacritic, the film received a score of 52 based on 13 reviews, indicating "mixed or average" reviews.

Although it was not well received by critics, the film was a modest success at the box office, opening at the #3 spot and making nearly $30 million in domestic sales. Audiences polled by CinemaScore gave the film an average grade of "A" on an A+ to F scale.

== Home media ==
The film was released on Blu-ray by Anchor Bay Entertainment on May 28, 2013.

== See also ==
- Central Intelligence – 2016 film by Rawson Marshall Thurber
