= Dear God (film) =

- Theatrical release poster
- Directed by: Garry Marshall
- Written by: Warren Leight; Ed Kaplan
- Produced by: Mario Iscovich
- Starring: Greg Kinnear; Laurie Metcalf; Maria Pitillo; Tim Conway; Roscoe Lee Browne; Jon Seda; Hector Elizondo
- Cinematography: Charles Minsky
- Edited by: Debra Neil-Fisher
- Music by: James Patrick Dunne; Jeremy Lubbock
- Production company: Rysher Entertainment
- Distributed by: Paramount Pictures
- Release date: November 1, 1996
- Running time: 112 minutes
- Country: United States
- Language: English
- Budget: $22 million
- Box office: $7,138,523

Dear God is a 1996 American comedy film directed by Garry Marshall and starring Greg Kinnear and Laurie Metcalf. Kinnear stars as Tom Turner, a con artist who gets a job at the dead letter office of a post office, and finds his life changing after reading letters sent to God.

The song of the same title by Midge Ure was used in the film's theatrical trailer and in the film itself. Dear God was released by Paramount Pictures on November 1, 1996 to mostly negative reviews from critics. The film was a box office bomb, grossing $7,138,523 against a $22 million budget.

== Plot ==
Los Angeles con artist Tom Turner is arrested for working cons. He is presently doing them to pay off his gambling debt to the loan shark Junior. Tom is sentenced by the judge to find a full-time job by the end of the week and keep it for at least a year, or be sent to jail.

Tom finds work at the post office sorting mail in the dead letter office. Surrounded by quirky coworkers, Tom finds out what happens to letters addressed to the Easter Bunny, Elvis Presley, and God. Out of curiosity, he reads one of the letters addressed to God. While reading it, from a single mother in need, Tom accidentally drops his paycheck, which is mailed back to her. When he comes to retrieve his paycheck, he sees the good it has done and leaves, not knowing that Rebecca, a burnt-out workaholic lawyer coworker doing pro-bono work, has seen him doing so.

Believing that Tom sent the money on purpose, Rebecca rallies the rest of the dead letter office workers to continue what he has started. Tom, becoming the unwilling leader of the group, starts answering more and more letters asking God for help. The group answers more prayers, enriching people's lives, while Tom tries to find love with Gloria, a coffee bar waitress, and keep out of jail.

After the loan shark trashes Tom's apartment, things are replaced by 'God' or rather his coworkers. Webster, Junior's 'heavy', stops by to let him know that he was hit by a bus, so is off the hook for the loan.

Others begin to step up, replacing Christmas presents stolen from the Salvation Army. The Santa Monica homeless had canned goods delivered to them as requested, and 5,000 in cash comes in. Tom, believing that it is a trap, suggests they lie low for a while. The postmaster general announces on a news report that it is a federal offense for postal workers to open mail not addressed to them. The postal police show up to arrest Idris Abraham, as he took responsibility for giving a homeless man a trumpet.

Tom confesses on television, saying that it was all him. Rebecca, acting as his defense attourney, calls the other postal workers from the department. As she is making her closing statements, Herman, a fellow postal worker who sees that Rebecca is losing, calls in postal carriers from throughout Los Angeles. They fill the streets around the courthouse demanding that Tom be released. The judge declares him not guilty, only holding him to complete the 12 months of work sentenced to him in the previous hearing.

== Cast ==
=== Main cast ===
- Greg Kinnear as Tom Turner
- Laurie Metcalf as Rebecca Frazen
- Maria Pitillo as Gloria McKinney
- Tim Conway as Herman Dooly
- Anna Maria Horsford as Lucille Barnett
- Hector Elizondo as Vladek Vidov
- Jon Seda as Handsome
- Roscoe Lee Browne as Idris Abraham
- Donal Logue as Webster
- John Pinette as Junior
- Larry Miller as Judge (lower court)
- Coolio as Gerard
- Toby Huss as Doubting Thomas Minister
- Jack Klugman as Jemi
- Rue McClanahan as Mom Turner
- Ellen Cleghorne as Marguerite
- Stephanie Niznik as Emanda Maine
- Israel Juarbe as Ernesto on Scaffold

=== Uncredited cameos ===
- Garry Marshall as Preston Sweeney, Postmaster
- David Hasselhoff as himself
- Tony Danza as himself
- Elinor Donahue as herself
- Dr. Joyce Brothers as herself
- Christopher Darden as himself
- Cassandra Peterson as herself

== Reception ==
Dear God received generally negative reviews from critics. Siskel & Ebert gave the film two thumbs down upon its release. James Berardinelli gave the film one star and explained, "At least after seeing this movie, I understand where the title came from – starting about thirty minutes into this interminable, unfunny feature, I began looking at my watch every few minutes and thinking, 'Dear God, is this ever going to end?' A sickeningly bad pastiche of much better pictures – It's a Wonderful Life, Miracle on 34th Street, and (believe it or not) Spartacus all leap to mind – Dear God is the worst excuse for a holiday film since Nora Ephron's hideous Mixed Nuts."

As of April 2025, film review aggregator Rotten Tomatoes had given the film a 14% positive rating, based on reviews from 35 critics. The consensus summarizes: "Dear God never had a prayer, with Greg Kinnear's angelic charisma weighted down by a screenplay bereft of wit but heavy on schmaltz."
