= Frankie & Johnny (1991 film) =

1991 film by Garry Marshall

- Theatrical release poster
- Directed by: Garry Marshall
- Written by: Terrence McNally
- Based on: Frankie and Johnny in the Clair de Lune by Terrence McNally
- Produced by: Garry Marshall
- Starring: Al Pacino; Michelle Pfeiffer; Héctor Elizondo; Kate Nelligan
- Cinematography: Dante Spinotti
- Edited by: Jacqueline Cambas; Battle Davis
- Music by: Marvin Hamlisch
- Distributed by: Paramount Pictures
- Release date: October 11, 1991
- Running time: 118 minutes
- Country: United States
- Language: English
- Budget: $29 million
- Box office: $67 million

Frankie & Johnny is a 1991 American romantic comedy-drama film directed by Garry Marshall and starring Al Pacino and Michelle Pfeiffer (in their first film together since Scarface). Héctor Elizondo, Nathan Lane and Kate Nelligan appear in supporting roles. The original score is composed by Marvin Hamlisch.

The screenplay for Frankie & Johnny is adapted by Terrence McNally from his own off-Broadway play Frankie and Johnny in the Clair de Lune, which featured F. Murray Abraham and Kathy Bates. The most notable alteration in the film is the addition of several supporting characters and various locations; in the original play, only the two eponymous characters appear onstage, and the entire drama takes place in one apartment.

The title is a reference to the traditional American popular song "Frankie and Johnny", first published in 1904, which tells the story of a woman who finds her man having sex with another woman and shoots him dead. The film received generally favorable reviews and grossed $67 million with a $29 million budget.

== Plot ==
An emotionally scarred waitress named Frankie attends her godson's baptism in Altoona, Pennsylvania. Meanwhile, a middle-aged man named Johnny is released from prison. Frankie returns home to her job waitressing at the Apollo Cafe in New York City. The cafe's owner Nick sends Frankie's co-worker Helen home early after she complains of dizziness. Johnny arrives seeking a job, and Nick hires him as a short-order cook despite his criminal record. After work, Frankie returns home to her apartment to find a stranger, Bobby, installing shelves, but he is revealed to be the boyfriend of her friend and neighbor Tim. That night, Johnny solicits a prostitute, but merely asks her to lie clothed in bed with him.

The next day, Nick announces to his staff that Helen has been hospitalized. Frankie and her co-worker Cora visit an unconscious Helen and share their fears of dying alone like her. The next day, after helping a man who had an epileptic seizure, Johnny asks out Frankie on a date, but she refuses. Helen dies, and Frankie, Cora and fellow waitress Nedda are surprised to see Johnny at her funeral. Back at work, Johnny asks Frankie out again. After she again refuses, he has a one-night stand with Cora, who shares the details with Frankie and Nedda.

Weeks pass, and Johnny asks Frankie to be his date at a co-worker's going-away party, but she refuses again. He comes to her apartment anyway, where Bobby and Tim help Frankie decide what to wear. At the party, Johnny attempts to convince Frankie that they are a good match. After the party, he buys her a flower and persuades her to take him back to her apartment, where they spend an intimate night together.

Convinced that they are meant to be together, Johnny shows up at her bowling night and professes his love to her. Frankie argues that he cannot love her after such a short period of time and reveals that she cannot have children after Johnny mentions starting a family. Afterward, Frankie tries to avoid Johnny by not answering his phone calls and switching her shifts at the cafe. However, Johnny switches his shifts too, and they talk to each other. Johnny confesses that he is divorced and has two children whom he has not seen since he got out of prison, having served time for check fraud. Frankie encourages him to see them, and she confesses that her last boyfriend cheated on her with her best friend.

After work, Johnny walks Frankie to her apartment, where they discuss their lives and listen to "Clair de lune". However, the intimacy makes Frankie uncomfortable, and they argue. She asks him to leave, but before he does, he calls the radio station and asks them to play an encore of "Clair de lune". Frankie confesses that a previous boyfriend had physically abused her, at one point causing her to have a miscarriage that made her unable to have children. Frankie invites Johnny to stay, and they watch the sunrise together.

== Cast ==
- Al Pacino as Johnny
- Michelle Pfeiffer as Frankie
- Héctor Elizondo as Nick
- Nathan Lane as Tim
- Jane Morris as Nedda
- Greg Lewis as Tino
- Al Fann as Luther
- Glenn Plummer as Peter
- Sean O'Bryan as Bobby
- Fernando López as Jorge
- Ele Keats as Artemis
- Phil Leeds as Mr. DeLeon
- K Callan as Frankie's Mother
- Shannon Wilcox as Christine the Hooker
- Kate Nelligan as Cora
- Frank Campanella as Retired Customer
- Elizabeth Kerr as Senior Citizen Customer
- Al Sapienza as Peter's Roommate
- Tracy Reiner as Attorney at Party
- Frank Buxton as Minister
- Dedee Pfeiffer as Frankie's Cousin

== Production ==
Star Trek VI: The Undiscovered Country was filming in a nearby studio, and Garry Marshall arranged for actors William Shatner (James T. Kirk), Leonard Nimoy (Spock) and DeForest Kelley (Leonard Mccoy) to appear fully costumed, out of camera shot, behind a door in one scene to elicit genuine surprise from Al Pacino when he opened it.

In 2025, Kathy Bates, who originated the lead female role in the play, stated that Marshall declined to cast her in the film adaptation because he didn't think she looked pretty enough to be a romantic lead.

== Reception ==
On Rotten Tomatoes, Frankie & Johnny holds an approval rating of 69%, based on 35 reviews, with an average rating of 6.7/10.

Peter Travers in Rolling Stone wrote, "There hasn't been a sharper, sassier, more touching romantic comedy this year... there's no denying Marshall's expert timing. This is the director's best work yet... In its celebration of cautious optimism, Frankie and Johnny becomes the perfect love story for these troubled times."

Janet Maslin in The New York Times wrote, "In the skillfully manipulative hands of Garry Marshall, who has directed from a screenplay by Mr. McNally that amounts to a complete revision, Frankie and Johnny has been reshaped into foolproof schmaltz. 'Foolproof' is the operative word... But somehow Mr. Marshall, Mr. McNally and their superb leading actors are able to retain the intimacy of their material. They also retain the story's fundamental wariness about romance, even when everything about Ms. Pfeiffer and Mr. Pacino has the audience wondering why they don't simply fall into each other's arms."

Rita Kempley in The Washington Post wrote, "In its odyssey from stage to screen, Frankie & Johnny has undergone a sunny metamorphosis from ugly ducklings' romance to candy-coated, blue-collar valentine."

Time Out summed it up thus: "Pacino wears a vest and bandanna and moons through the part. Pfeiffer plays dowdy. Marshall directs as if Marty had never happened."

Much attention was paid to the controversial casting choices of Al Pacino and Michelle Pfeiffer, two actors perceived as "beautiful movie stars" with Hollywood glamour cast to play "lonely little people struggling to find love", originated by supposed "ordinary" actors Kenneth Welsh and Kathy Bates.

Stephen Farber in Movieline wrote, "Michelle Pfeiffer gives a very adept and winning performance in Frankie & Johnny, but she's simply wrong for the part of a plain, world-weary waitress. While Pfeiffer has protested to interviewers that physical beauty cannot guarantee happiness, the fact remains that anyone as gorgeous as she is has a lot more options than someone who looks like Kathy Bates (who originated the role on stage). The star casting robs the material of some of its poignancy."

The Washington Post wrote that "casting Michelle Pfeiffer in a role written for Kathy Bates is going to have a definite effect on the story's dramatic weight. That's not to say that Pfeiffer isn't pfantastic or that this isn't the pfeel-good movie of the season. It's just ... well, imagine Kevin Costner as Marty."

Variety asserted that no one would "believe that Pfeiffer hasn't had a date since Ronald Reagan was president, and no matter how hard she tries to look plain, there is no disguising that she just gets more beautiful all the time".

However, some critics commended Pfeiffer for her performance, notably Rolling Stone, who called it "a triumph. She is among that rarefied group of actresses (Anjelica Huston, Meryl Streep) whose work keeps taking us by surprise. Her powerfully subtle acting can tickle the funny bone or pierce the heart with equally uncanny skill."

The New York Times wrote, "Ms. Pfeiffer's extraordinary beauty makes her fine-tuned, deeply persuasive performance as the tough and fearful Frankie that much more surprising."

Pacino also received critical praise. Rolling Stone wrote, "Pacino, whose recent work has been lugubrious (The Godfather Part III) or broad (Dick Tracy), shows a real flair for comic delicacy."

The New York Times wrote, "Mr. Pacino has not been this uncomplicatedly appealing since his Dog Day Afternoon days, and he makes Johnny's endless enterprise in wooing Frankie a delight. His scenes alone with Ms. Pfeiffer have a precision and honesty that keep the film's maudlin aspects at bay."

Variety, however, described him as "a warm, slobbering dog who can't leave people alone, Pacino's Johnny comes on real strong, and his pronounced neediness is too much at times".

Kate Nelligan was singled out for her supporting turn; The New York Times wrote, "Kate Nelligan, nearly unrecognizable, is outstandingly enjoyable as the gum-chewing, man-crazy one." Rolling Stone thought that "seeing this Royal Shakespeare Company actress cut loose with this bold and brassy performance is one of the film's zippiest treats".

The film opened on 1,150 screens, but grossed $4.8 million for the weekend, failing to dislodge The Fisher King from the number-one position and finishing third for the weekend. It went on to gross $22.8 million in the United States and Canada, and $44.2 million overseas, for a worldwide gross of $67 million.

== Awards and nominations ==
Award	Category	Nominee(s)	Result	Ref.
British Academy Film Awards	Best Actress in a Supporting Role	Kate Nelligan	Won	
GLAAD Media Awards	Outstanding Film		Won (Note: Tied with Fried Green Tomatoes)	
Golden Globe Awards	Best Actress in a Motion Picture – Musical or Comedy	Michelle Pfeiffer	Nominated	
National Board of Review Awards	Top Ten Films		9th Place	
National Board of Review Awards	Best Supporting Actress	Kate Nelligan	Won	
New York Film Critics Circle Awards	Best Supporting Actress	Kate Nelligan	Runner-up	

== Soundtrack ==
A soundtrack album featuring music from Frankie & Johnny, including diegetic material and incidental orchestral score, was released in 1991 on Curb Records. The album omits Terence Trent D'Arby's contribution to the film's title sequence, but includes the scored version of Debussy's "Clair de lune" employed for the film's denouement.
