= With Friends Like These... =

- Directed by: Philip Frank Messina
- Written by: Philip Frank Messina
- Produced by: Robert Greenhut; Penny Marshall; Amy Lemisch; Jon Ein (executive)
- Starring: Bill Murray; Adam Arkin
- Cinematography: Brian J. Reynolds
- Edited by: Claudia Finkle
- Music by: John Powell
- Distributed by: Parkway / Quadrant Films
- Release date: 1998
- Running time: 105 minutes
- Country: United States
- Language: English

With Friends Like These... is a 1998 American comedy film directed by Philip Frank Messina and starring Robert Costanzo, Jon Tenney, David Strathairn and Adam Arkin. Bill Murray appears in a cameo.

The film was originally released on home video in 1998 and was later give a theatrical release in 2005.

== Plot ==
Four small-time two-bit character actors (Costanzo, Tenney, Strathairn, and Arkin), all close friends, are competing for the same important part in the next Martin Scorsese mob film.

== Cast ==
- Adam Arkin as Steve Hersh
- David Strathairn as Armand Minetti
- Jon Tenney as Dorian Mastandrea
- Robert Costanzo as Johnny DiMartino
- Amy Madigan as Hannah DiMartino
- Laura San Giacomo as Joanne Hersh
- Elle Macpherson as Samantha Mastandrea
- Lauren Tom as Yolanda Chin
- Beverly D'Angelo as Theresa Carpenter
- Ashley Peldon as Marissa DiMartino
- Allison Bertolino as Dana DiMartino
- Bill Murray as Maurice Melnick
- Frederika Kesten as Catrice
- John Capodice as Actor Friend
- Carmine Costanzo as Nino DiMartino
- Heather Stephens as Babette
- Martin Scorsese as Himself
- Jon Polito as Rudy Ptak

== Critical reception ==
The Village Voice, "Even a few strong strands of acting from David Strathairn aren't enough to stitch the threadbare script in this cheap mohair suit of a movie, where plot and characterization are drawn strictl off the rack. Only a mook could love it, and if you don't know what a mook is, go see With Friends Like These and be found—I mean find out."

The New York Times, ""With Friends Like These," which was originally released seven years ago on home video, is only now surfacing as a theatrical release. Although it's no classic, it's a cut or two smarter than the average Hollywood comedy. At its best, it plays like a less acerbic, less Jewish triple episode of "Curb Your Enthusiasm." The movie's retrieval from oblivion is well deserved."
