= Mother's Day (2016 film) =

2016 film by Garry Marshall

- Theatrical release poster
- Directed by: Garry Marshall
- Screenplay by: Tom Hines; Anya Kochoff Romano; Matt Walker
- Story by: Tom Hines; Lily Hollander; Garry Marshall; Matt Walker
- Produced by: Brandt Andersen; Howard Burd; Daniel Diamond; Mark DiSalle; Wayne Rice; Mike Karz
- Starring: Jennifer Aniston; Kate Hudson; Julia Roberts; Jason Sudeikis; Britt Robertson; Timothy Olyphant; Héctor Elizondo; Jack Whitehall
- Narrated by: Penny Marshall
- Cinematography: Charles Minsky
- Edited by: Bruce Green; Robert Malina
- Music by: John Debney
- Production companies: Capacity Pictures; Gulfstream Pictures; PalmStar Media
- Distributed by: Open Road Films
- Release dates: April 13, 2016 (Los Angeles); April 29, 2016 (United States)
- Running time: 118 minutes
- Country: United States
- Language: English
- Budget: $25 million
- Box office: $52.4 million

Mother's Day is a 2016 American romantic comedy film directed by Garry Marshall, written by Marshall, Tom Hines, Lily Hollander, Anya Kochoff-Romano, and Matt Walker, and starring an ensemble cast consisting of Jennifer Aniston, Kate Hudson, Julia Roberts, Jason Sudeikis, Britt Robertson, Timothy Olyphant, Héctor Elizondo, and Jack Whitehall. Filming began on August 18, 2015, in Atlanta. It was the final film of Marshall's career prior to his death in July 2016 as well as the final film appearance of his sister Penny before her death in December 2018.

Mother's Day premiered in Los Angeles on April 13, 2016 and was theatrically released in the United States on April 29, 2016, by Open Road Films. The film was widely panned by critics, and underperformed at the box office, grossing $25 million worldwide against a $52.4 million budget. At the 37th Golden Raspberry Awards, Roberts and Hudson received nominations for Worst Actress and Worst Supporting Actress respectively.

== Plot ==
As Mother's Day nears, a group of seemingly-unconnected people in Atlanta come to terms with their relationships with their mothers.

Sandy is a divorced mother of two sons, Mikey and Peter, whose ex-husband, Henry, has recently married a younger woman, Tina. Still getting used to this, she meets Bradley, a former Marine, in the supermarket. Bradley's wife Dana, a Marine Lieutenant, died a year previously, leaving him with their two daughters, Vicky and Rachel.

Kristin, adopted from birth, has her own daughter, Katie, and mulls over marrying the father of her child, Zack. She considers her life incomplete and her friend Jesse encourages her to search for her birth mother. Jesse also happens to be Sandy's best friend.

Jesse is married and has a son, Tanner, with Russell, who is Indian. Her sister Gabi is married to her wife Max and has a son, Charlie. When their racist, homophobic parents, Earl and Florence, unexpectedly show up, they have to come to terms with who their daughters are and the partners they have chosen.

As she's in Atlanta promoting her latest book, Miranda, an accomplished author and television personality, gets a surprise visit from Kristin, who is her daughter who she was forced to give her up for adoption at birth, as she was very young. Their making up leads to Kristin asking Zach to marry her on air and marrying on the same day, so Miranda can participate.

Sandy, an interior designer, hopes to land a job designing the stage for Miranda’s new talk show, but numerous circumstances cause her to miss the design meeting. A frustrated Sandy causes a scene expressing all the reasons she was late in front of Miranda, who is left curious and asks to meet with Sandy. While Sandy tries to pitch her stage design, Miranda asks about Sandy’s personal life and her blunt and amusing answers impress Miranda enough to give her the designer job.

Jesse and Gabi's parents ambush them and their partners on their camper-van, and with Russell's mom's help through Skype, force him to make up with Jesse. Later on, the families including his mom, who flies in from Vegas, celebrate Mother's Day with a picnic in the park.

Sandy and Bradley meet again by chance in the hospital. She's there because of her younger son's asthma attack, he because of a mishap in the Mother's Day party he was throwing which ended with his going to the hospital for a broken leg. Helping her get unstuck from a vending machine, combined with his daughters' encouragement, Bradley finally starts to see her in a positive light.

== Cast ==
- Jennifer Aniston as Sandy Newhouse, Henry's ex-wife and Mikey and Peter's mother
- Kate Hudson as Jesse, Russell’s wife, Gabi’s sister, Tanner's mother, and Earl and Florence’s daughter
- Julia Roberts as Miranda Collins, Kristin's birth mother
- Jason Sudeikis as Bradley Barton, a widower, Vicky and Rachel’s father and Dana’s husband
- Timothy Olyphant as Henry, Tina’s husband, Sandy's ex-husband, and Mikey and Peter's father
- Shay Mitchell as Tina, Henry's new wife and Mikey and Peter's stepmother
- Britt Robertson as Kristin, Miranda's daughter, Zack's girlfriend, and Katie's mother
- Jack Whitehall as Zack Zimm, Kristin's boyfriend and Katie's father
- Héctor Elizondo as Ramon Navarro / Lance Wallace, Miranda's agent
- Margo Martindale as Florence "Flo", Gabi and Jesse's mother and Earl’s wife
- Sarah Chalke as Gabi, Jesse's sister, Max’s wife, Charlie's adoptive mother, and Earl and Florence’s daughter
- Robert Pine as Earl, Gabi and Jesse's father and Florence’s husband
- Aasif Mandvi as Russell Kohli, Jesse's husband and Tanner's father
- Cameron Esposito as Max, Gabi's wife and Charlie's mother
- Jon Lovitz as Wally Burn
- Loni Love as Kimberly
- Lucy Walsh as Jody
- Beth Kennedy as Gwenda
- Sandra Taylor as Lexy
- Ella Anderson as Vicky Barton, Dana and Bradley's daughter
- Jessi Case as Rachel Barton, Dana and Bradley’s daughter
- Grayson Russell as Tommy
- Matthew Walker as Randy
- Lisa Roberts Gillan as Betty
- Kate Linder as Gigi
- Jennifer Garner as Dana Barton, Bradley’s recently deceased wife and Vicky and Rachel’s mother
- Paul C. Vogt as Tiny
- Owen Vaccaro as Charlie, Max and Gabi's son
- Scott Marshall as Sam
- Christine Lakin as The Hostess
- Rory O'Malley as The Customer
- Larry Miller as The Motorcycle Cop
- Sean O'Bryan as The Male Cop

== Production ==
=== Development ===
In April 2013, Dennis Dugan confirmed that he would next develop Garry Marshall's comedy film Mother's Day.

=== Casting ===
On June 30, 2015, four cast members were announced, Julia Roberts, Jennifer Aniston, Kate Hudson, and Jason Sudeikis. The film was directed by Garry Marshall and scripted by Anya Kochoff-Romano and Lily Hollander. Brandt Andersen produced, along with Wayne Rice and Mike Karz. On July 22, 2015, Open Road Films acquired US distribution rights to the film and it was revealed that Matt Walker and Tom Hines would co-write the script. On August 21, 2015, Ella Anderson joined the film's cast to play Vicky, Sudeikis' character's daughter. On August 26, 2015, Timothy Olyphant, Britt Robertson, Shay Mitchell, Jack Whitehall, Loni Love, and Aasif Mandvi joined the cast. On October 6, Hilary Duff was confirmed to appear, but she declined due to scheduling conflicts with filming the second season of her show Younger.

=== Filming ===
Principal photography on the film began on August 18, 2015, in Atlanta. Though shooting her part required only four days, Julia Roberts was paid $3 million.

== Release ==
Mother's Day was released domestically on April 29, 2016, by Open Road Films.

== Reception ==
=== Box office ===
Mother's Day grossed $32.5 million in the United States and Canada, and $19.9 million in other territories, for a worldwide total of $52.4 million, against a production budget of $25 million.

In the United States and Canada, the film was released alongside Keanu and Ratchet & Clank, and was projected to gross around $11 million from 3,035 theaters in its opening weekend. The film grossed $2.6 million on its first day and $8.4 million in its opening weekend, finishing 4th at the box office, behind The Jungle Book ($43.7 million), The Huntsman: Winter's War ($9.6 million), and Keanu ($9.5 million). In its second weekend, which coincided with the holiday, the film grossed $11.1 million (an increase of 32.5%), finishing 3rd at the box office, behind Captain America: Civil War ($179.1 million) and The Jungle Book ($24.5 million).

=== Critical response ===
On review aggregator website Rotten Tomatoes, the film has an approval rating of 8% based on 156 reviews and an average rating of 3.1/10. The site's critical consensus reads, "Arguably well-intended yet thoroughly misguided, Mother's Day is the cinematic equivalent of a last-minute gift that only underscores its embarrassing lack of effort." On Metacritic, the film has a score of 18 out of 100 based on 30 critics, indicating "overwhelming dislike". Audiences polled by CinemaScore gave the film an average grade of "B+" on an A+ to F scale.

Richard Roeper gave the film zero out of four stars, saying, "...nothing could have prepared us for the offensively stupid, shamelessly manipulative, ridiculously predictable and hopelessly dated crapfest that is Mother's Day."

Peter Bradshaw, writing in The Guardian, gave the film one star out of five, calling it "as feelgood and life-affirming as a fire in an asbestos factory neighbouring a children's hospital."

=== Accolades ===
Award	Category	Recipients	Result
Teen Choice Awards	Choice Movie: Comedy	Mother's Day	Nominated
Teen Choice Awards	Choice Movie Actress: Comedy	Jennifer Aniston	Nominated
Golden Raspberry Awards	Worst Actress	Julia Roberts	Nominated
Golden Raspberry Awards	Worst Supporting Actress	Kate Hudson	Nominated

== See also ==
- List of films set around Mother's Day
