= 1978 in American television =

In 1978, television in the United States saw a number of significant events, including the debuts, finales, and cancellations of television shows; the launch, closure, and rebranding of channels; changes and additions to network affiliations by stations; controversies, business transactions, and carriage disputes; and the deaths of individuals who had made notable contributions to the medium.

== Events ==
Date	Event
January 15	Super Bowl XII airs on CBS, the first time the NFL's championship event is played and telecast at night. The Dallas Cowboys defeat the Denver Broncos 27-10.
January 23	Roots One Year Later, a special examining the impact and influence of the miniseries, airs on ABC.
January 28	The Doobie Brothers make a guest appearance on ABC's What's Happening!!
February 5	ABC celebrates its silver anniversary with a retrospective special.
February 28	Robin Williams makes his first appearance as Mork from Ork on an episode of Happy Days on ABC. The episode proved to be such a success, that it would soon give way to a spin-off starring Williams entitled Mork & Mindy.
March 7	Showtime goes nationwide on the air.
March 22	The Beatles spoof The Rutles: All You Need Is Cash airs on NBC.
March 26–April 1	CBS commemorates its golden anniversary in radio and TV broadcasting with CBS: On the Air, a 9½-hour retrospective special airing over 7 nights.
April 16–19	Holocaust, starring James Woods and Meryl Streep first airs on NBC.
April 17	KDOG-TV, Houston's independent station, changes its call sign to KRIV-TV following its purchase by Metromedia.
April 22	The Blues Brothers make their first appearance on NBC's Saturday Night Live; the duo of Jake & Elwood Blues (John Belushi and Dan Aykroyd) are introduced in a skit by Paul Shaffer (as Don Kirshner) and performs "Hey Bartender".
April 26	Ringo Starr's, Ringo, a musical version of The Prince and the Pauper, airs on NBC, with Starr's fellow former Beatle, George Harrison, providing the narration.
May 7	The television special celebrating the 30th anniversary of the state of Israel, The Stars Salute Israel at 30 is broadcast on ABC.
June 12	WHNB-TV, NBC affiliate in New Britain/Hartford/New Haven, Connecticut, changes its name to its current WVIT, shortly after Viacom purchased the station.
June 26	WTOP-TV changes its call sign to WDVM-TV. In return the NBC affiliate, WWJ-TV changes its call sign to WDIV-TV.
July 1	In Charlotte, North Carolina, NBC affiliate WSOC-TV leaves the network and joins ABC, citing a stronger affiliation (at the time, NBC is in last place among the three major networks, while ABC is in first place). NBC eventually aligns with Ted Turner-owned independent station WRET-TV (now WCNC-TV), tempted by promises Turner made to NBC to make $2.5 million worth of upgrades, including a stronger transmitter and the launch of a news department; former ABC affiliate WCCB becomes an independent station, and eventually a charter affiliate of Fox in 1986.
July 10	On ABC, the ABC Evening News is revamped to become ABC World News Tonight, employing a unique three-anchor setup (Frank Reynolds serving as lead anchor from Washington, Max Robinson presenting national news from Chicago, and Peter Jennings with international news from London).
August 1	Taking advantage of an oral escape-clause in his contract with ABC, Harry Reasoner returns to CBS, eventually rejoining 60 Minutes, the program he anchored with Mike Wallace from its 1968 premiere until he joined ABC News in 1970.
September 17	All three networks interrupts primetime programming by 10:30pm (the three-hour premiere of Battlestar Galactica on ABC, live coverage of that's year Primetime Emmy Awards on CBS, and the second part of 1976 film King Kong, shown on The Big Event on NBC) to broadcast from the White House East Room the ceremony formalizing the success of the peace talks between Israel's Menachem Begin and Egypt's Anwar Sadat—the Camp David Accords.
September 18	The chairs on which Archie and Edith Bunker sat through 8 seasons of the CBS comedy All in the Family are presented to the Smithsonian Institution.
September 27	Replacing Zara Cully and Damon Evans, Jay Hammer joins the cast of the CBS comedy The Jeffersons, for a short period of time.
October 7	On NBC's Saturday Night Live, The Rolling Stones become the first and to date, only band to serve as both hosts and musical guests in the same episode.
October 14	SIN broadcasts the final of the 1st National OTI-SIN Festival live from the Miami Jai-Alai Fronton in Miami.
October 14–21	NBC airs Rescue from Gilligan's Island as two-part special. The reunion film features all of the original cast of 1964–67 sitcom Gilligan's Island, with the exception of Tina Louise, who is replaced in the role of Ginger Grant by Judith Baldwin. Rescue from Gilligan's Island will soon be followed up by The Castaways on Gilligan's Island (1979) and The Harlem Globetrotters on Gilligan's Island (1981).
October 31	On NBC, Norma Brown wins $28,800 playing the Money Cards on Card Sharks, the first and only time a contestant has won the maximum amount.
November 9	Jack Soo makes his final appearance as Nick Yemana on the ABC sitcom Barney Miller prior to his death from cancer on January 11, 1979. The Season 5 finale of Barney Miller (airing later that May) would subsequently, feature the cast stepping out of character to pay tribute to Soo.
November 12	In Fort Smith, Arkansas, KLMN-TV (now Fox affiliate KFTA-TV) signs-on the air and takes CBS programming from KFPW-TV/KTVP. Both KFPW-TV and KTVP subsequently become full-time ABC affiliates, giving Fort Smith in-market affiliates of all three major networks.
November 17	The Star Wars Holiday Special airs on CBS. The special gives fans their first glimpse of Boba Fett, a character from the upcoming Star Wars sequel.
November 20	Anthony Geary makes his first appearance as Luke Spencer on General Hospital. Initially due to stay for thirteen weeks, his character was then given a contract. A year later, Luke drunkenly raped Laura Webber (Genie Francis), thus giving birth to what is considered as daytime television's signature supercouple, with their wedding in 1981 attracting thirty million viewers. Geary would play Luke until December 1983, returning for a guest arc (alongside Francis) in late 1984. After coming back to General Hospital in 1991 to play Bill Eckert (a look-alike of Luke), he resumed the latter role two years later due to Francis' return, eventually staying until 2015, with a guest appearance in 2017 to say goodbye to his latest wife Tracy Quartermaine (Jane Elliot). Luke Spencer was later killed off in early 2022.

== Programs ==
=== Debuting this year ===
Date	Show	Network
January 28	Fantasy Island	ABC
January 30	Baby... I'm Back!	CBS
January 31	The Harvey Korman Show	ABC
February 19	Project U.F.O.	NBC
March 7	Having Babies	ABC
March 10	Husbands, Wives & Lovers	CBS
March 10	The Incredible Hulk	CBS
March 14	Sam	CBS
March 16	A.E.S. Hudson Street	ABC
March 17	Richie Brockelman, Private Eye	NBC
April 2	Dallas	CBS
April 3	Pass the Buck	CBS
April 3	Ever Increasing Faith	Syndication
April 5	The Amazing Spider-Man	CBS
April 8	The Ted Knight Show	CBS
April 8	Another Day	CBS
April 13	The Hanna-Barbera Happy Hour	NBC
April 24	Card Sharks	NBC
April 24	Joe & Valerie	NBC
April 24	Rollergirls	NBC
April 27	The Runaways	NBC
June 6	20/20	ABC
June 24	Free Country	ABC
July 10	World News Tonight	ABC
July 24	America Alive!	NBC
August 28	Flying High	CBS
September 7	Grandpa Goes to Washington	NBC
September 7	The Waverly Wonders	NBC
September 8	The Eddie Capra Mysteries	NBC
September 9	Fabulous Funnies	NBC
September 9	The New Fantastic Four	NBC
September 9	Galaxy Goof-Ups	NBC
September 9	Godzilla	NBC
September 9	Jana of the Jungle	NBC
September 9	The Krofft Superstar Hour	NBC
September 9	Yogi's Space Race	NBC
September 9	Challenge of the Superfriends	ABC
September 9	Fangface	ABC
September 9	The All New Popeye Hour	CBS
September 9	The Paper Chase	CBS
September 9	Tarzan and the Super 7	CBS
September 10	Kids Are People Too	ABC
September 10	Kaz	CBS
September 10	Sword of Justice	NBC
September 12	Taxi	ABC
September 12	Battle of the Planets	Syndication
September 13	W.E.B.	NBC
September 14	Mork & Mindy	ABC
September 16	30 Minutes	CBS
September 17	Battlestar Galactica	ABC
September 17	Lifeline	NBC
September 18	WKRP in Cincinnati	CBS
September 20	Dick Clark's Live Wednesday	NBC
September 20	In the Beginning	CBS
September 20	Vega$	ABC
September 22	Who's Watching the Kids?	NBC
September 23	Apple Pie	ABC
September 23	The American Girls	CBS
September 24	Mary	CBS
October 1	Centennial	NBC
October 30	A.M. Weather	PBS
November 2	David Cassidy: Man Undercover	NBC
November 3	Diff'rent Strokes	NBC
November 27	The White Shadow	CBS

=== Resuming this year ===
Show	Last aired	Previous network	Retitled as/Same	Returning
High Rollers	1976	NBC	The New High Rollers	April 24
Tic Tac Dough	1959	NBC	The New Tic Tac Dough	July 3
Scooby-Doo, Where Are You!	1970	CBS	Same	September 9
Jeopardy!	1975	NBC	The All-New Jeopardy!	October 2

=== Ending this year ===
Date	Show	Debut
January 7	We've Got Each Other	1977
January 9	The Betty White Show	1977
January 10	The Fitzpatricks	1977
January 13	The Better Sex	1977
January 14	Tabitha	1977
January 21	The Skatebirds	1977
January 25	Szysznyk	1977
January 28	Search and Rescue: The Alpha Team	1977
February 6	Logan's Run	1977
March 6	The Six Million Dollar Man	1973
March 18	Kojak	1973
March 18	The Robonic Stooges	1977
March 25	The Tony Randall Show	1976
March 25	What Really Happened to the Class of '65?	1977
March 29	The Carol Burnett Show	1967
March 30	Police Woman	1974
March 31	Tattletales	1974
April 1	The Bob Newhart Show	1972
April 6	Black Sheep Squadron	1976
April 7	Quark	1977
April 14	Richie Brockelman, Private Eye	1978
April 18	Sam	1978
April 20	A.E.S. Hudson Street	1978
April 21	Knockout	1977
April 21	To Say the Least	1977
April 22	Maude	1972
April 24	Baby... I'm Back!	1978
April 28	C.P.O. Sharkey	1976
April 29	Another Day	1978
April 30	On Our Own	1977
May 10	Rollergirls	1978
May 11	The Hanna-Barbera Happy Hour	1978
May 12	The Life and Times of Grizzly Adams	1977
May 13	The Ted Knight Show	1978
May 13	The Bionic Woman	1976
May 13	Columbo	1971
May 18	Baretta	1975
May 18	Fish	1977
May 29	Sugar Time!	1977
June 6	Man from Atlantis	1977
June 29	James at 16	1977
June 30	Husbands, Wives & Lovers	1978
June 30	Pass the Buck	1978
July 7	ABC Evening News	1970
July 21	Chico and the Man	1974
July 21	The Gong Show	1976
July 22	Free Country	1978
August 3	The Harvey Korman Show	1978
August 27	Switch	1975
September 1	Fred Flintstone and Friends	1977
September 2	The Batman/Tarzan Adventure Hour	1977
September 2	The Krofft Supershow	1976
September 29	For Richer, For Poorer	1977
September 30	Apple Pie	1978
October 5	W.E.B.	1978
October 6	The Waverly Wonders	1978
October 8	Mary	1978
October 18	In the Beginning	1978
October 28	Laff-A-Lympics	1977
November 10	The American Girls	1978
December 1	Fabulous Funnies	1978
December 2	Buford and the Galloping Ghost	1978
December 2	Galaxy Goof-Ups	1978
December 2	Yogi's Space Race	1978
December 4	Lucan	1977
December 9	Rhoda	1974
December 15	Who's Watching the Kids?	1978
December 16	The New Fantastic Four	1978
December 23	The Scooby-Doo Show	1976
December 23	Scooby's All-Stars	1977
December 23	Scooby-Doo, Where Are You!	1969
December 27	Dick Clark's Live Wednesday	1978

=== Made-for-TV movies and miniseries ===
Title	Network	Date of airing
The Dain Curse	CBS	May 22–24
King	NBC	February 12–14
Holocaust	NBC	April 16–19
Zuma Beach	NBC	September 27
Centennial	NBC	October 1–February 4
Donner Pass: The Road to Survival	NBC	October 24
The Time Machine	NBC	November 5
Someone's Watching Me!	NBC	November 29

== Networks and services ==
=== Launches ===
Network	Type	Launch date	Notes	Source
Home Theater Network	Cable television	September 1		
INSP	Cable television	Unknown		
WGN-TV	Cable television	November 9		
Operation Prime Time	Cable television	Unknown		

=== Network conversions and rebrandings ===
Network	Type	Conversion date	Source
Hughes Television Network	Occasional broadcast television network	April	
Paramount Television Service	Unrealized broadcast television network	Unknown	

=== Closures ===
There are no closures for Cable and satellite television channels in this year.

== Television stations ==
=== Station launches ===
Date	City of License/Market	Station	Channel	Affiliation	Notes/Ref.
January 3	Rock Hill, South Carolina (Charlotte, North Carolina)	WNSC-TV	30	PBS	Part of South Carolina ETV
February 9	Martin, South Dakota	KZSD-TV	8	PBS	Part of South Dakota Public Broadcasting
March 23	Washington, D.C.	WPXW-TV	66	Religious independent	
March 26	Manassas, Virginia/Washington, D.C.	WTKK	66	Religious independent	
May 1	Mason City, Iowa	KYIN	24	PBS	Part of Iowa Public Television
August 6	Cheyenne, Oklahoma	KWET	12	PBS	Part of the Oklahoma Educational Television Authority
August 9	Shreveport, Louisiana	KLTS-TV	24	PBS	Part of Louisiana Public Broadcasting
August 18	El Paso, Texas	KCOS	13	PBS	
August 21	Cookeville, Tennessee	WCTE	22	PBS	
September 2	Phoenix, Arizona	KTVW	23	Spanish International Network	Now a Univision affiliate
September 10	Memphis, Tennessee	WPTY-TV	24	Independent	
September 26	Pittsburgh, Pennsylvania	WPTT-TV	22	Independent	
September 27	Montpelier, Vermont	WNNE	31	NBC	Signed on as a satellite of WPTZ-TV/Plattsburgh, New York
October 1	Juneau, Alaska	KTOO-TV	3	PBS	Satellite of KAKM/Anchorage
October 24	Salt Lake City, Utah	KSTU	20 (now 13)	Independent	
November 12	Fort Smith, Arkansas	KLMN-TV	24	CBS	
November 27	Rockford, Illinois	WQRF-TV	39	Independent	
December 17	Kansas City, Missouri	KYFC	50	Independent	Was previously on air as KCIT-TV from 1969 to 1971.

=== Network affiliation changes ===
Date	City of license/Market	Station	Channel	Old affiliation	New affiliation	Notes/Ref.
July 1	Charlotte, North Carolina	WCCB	18	ABC	Independent	
July 1	Charlotte, North Carolina	WRET-TV	36	Independent	NBC	
July 1	Charlotte, North Carolina	WSOC-TV	9	NBC	ABC	

=== Station closures ===
Date	City of license/Market	Station	Channel	Affiliation	Sign-on date	Notes/Ref.
April 9	Greenfield, Massachusetts	WRLP	32	NBC	June 29, 1957	
August 15	Warrensburg/Sedalia, Missouri (Columbia/Jefferson City)	KMOS-TV	6	CBS	July 8, 1954 (as an independent station)	Returned to the air December 22, 1979 as a PBS member station

== Births ==
Date	Name	Notability
January 2	Patricia de Leon	Actress
January 3	Kimberley Locke	TV Personality (American Idol, Little Talent Show)
January 5	January Jones	Actress (Mad Men, The Last Man on Earth)
January 7	Ryan Star	Singer
January 8	Ron Pederson	Canadian actor (Mad TV)
January 9	AJ McLean	Actor and singer (Backstreet Boys)
January 10	Jill Nicolini	Actress
January 14	Sage Brocklebank	Actor
January 15	Jamie Clayton	Actress (Sense8)
January 15	Eddie Cahill	Actor (CSI: NY)
January 24	Kristen Schaal	Actress (Bob's Burgers, The Last Man on Earth, Gravity Falls)
January 26	Kelly Stables	Actress (W.I.T.C.H., Two and a Half Men, The Exes)
February 2	Rich Sommer	Actor (Mad Men)
February 3	Kelly Sullivan	Actress (Henry Danger, The Adventures of Kid Danger)
February 3	Eliza Schneider	Actress (Beakman's World, South Park, Squirrel Boy)
February 6	Har Mar Superstar	Actor
February 7	Ashton Kutcher	Actor (That '70s Show, Two and a Half Men)
February 14	Joanna Canton	Actress
February 14	Danai Gurira	Actor (The Walking Dead)
February 16	John Tartaglia	Actor
February 20	Lauren Ambrose	Actress (Six Feet Under)
February 20	Chelsea Peretti	Actress (Brooklyn Nine-Nine)
February 20	Jay Hernandez	Actor
February 21	Nicole Parker	Comedian, actress and singer (Mad TV)
February 24	Nicole Lyn	Actress
February 28	Geoffrey Arend	Actor
March 1	Donovan Patton	Actor (Blue's Clues, Team Umizoomi, Clarence)
March 1	Jensen Ackles	Actor (Days of Our Lives, Dark Angel, Smallville, Supernatural)
March 5	Kimberly McCullough	Actress (Once and Again, General Hospital)
March 5	Papoose	Rapper
March 8	Nick Zano	Actor (What I Like About You)
March 11	Rob Simonsen	Composer
March 14	Chris McCaleb	Director
March 16	Matthew Montgomery	Actor
March 16	Brooke Burns	Actress
March 17	Patrick Seitz	Actor
March 19	Virginia Williams	Actress (One Life to Live, Monarch Cove, Fairly Legal)
March 23	Anastasia Griffith	Actress (Damages, Trauma, Copper)
March 23	David Tom	Actor
March 23	Nicholle Tom	Actress (The Nanny)
March 23	Perez Hilton	Blogger
March 24	Amanda Brugel	Actress
March 25	Maribeth Monroe	Actress and comedian (Workaholics, The Brink)
April 1	Jason Bell	American former professional football player
April 2	Jaime Ray Newman	Actress (General Hospital, Eastwick)
April 2	Deon Richmond	Actor (The Cosby Show, Sister, Sister)
April 3	Matthew Goode	Actor
April 6	Lauren Ridloff	Actress
April 6	Tim Hasselbeck	American sports journalist
April 7	Nelson Cragg	Director
April 7	Jimmy Akingbola	Actor
April 12	Riley Smith	Actor
April 13	Kyle Howard	Actor (My Boys)
April 15	Chris Stapleton	Singer
April 17	Lindsay Hartley	Actress and singer (Days of Our Lives, All My Children, Passions)
April 17	Adam Jamal Craig	Actor (NCIS: Los Angeles)
April 19	James Franco	Actor (Freaks and Geeks)
April 19	Sheinelle Jones	American journalist and news anchor
April 20	Clayne Crawford	Actor (Lethal Weapon)
April 20	Matt Austin	Actor (Power Rangers S.P.D.)
April 20	Matthew Wilkas	Actor
April 22	Manu Intiraymi	Actor (Star Trek: Voyager)
April 23	Ian Brennan	Actor and writer
April 26	Stana Katic	Actress (Castle)
April 26	Pablo Schreiber	Canadian-American actor (The Wire, Orange Is the New Black)
April 26	Stephen Williams	Jamaican-Canadian director
April 28	Nate Richert	Actor (Sabrina the Teenage Witch)
April 28	Robert Oliveri	Former actor
April 29	Tyler Labine	Actor (New Amsterdam)
May 1	James Badge Dale	Actor (24, The Pacific, Rubicon)
May 2	Kumail Nanjiani	American-Pakistani actor (Silicon Valley, Franklin & Bash, Adventure Time)
May 4	Erin Andrews	Actress
May 5	Santiago Cabrera	Venezuelan-born Chilean-British actor (Heroes)
May 8	Matthew Davis	Actor (The Vampire Diaries)
May 9	Daniel Franzese	Actor
May 10	Corri English	Actress
May 10	Kenan Thompson	Actor (All That, Kenan & Kel, Saturday Night Live)
May 12	Jason Biggs	Actor (Orange Is the New Black, Teenage Mutant Ninja Turtles)
May 12	Malin Akerman	Actress (Childrens Hospital, Trophy Wife, Billions)
May 13	Brooke Anderson	Former co-host of The Insider
May 15	David Krumholtz	Actor (Numb3rs)
May 15	Caroline Dhavernas	Actress (Off the Map, Hannibal, Mary Kills People)
May 16	Jim Sturgess	Actor
May 17	Kat Foster	Actress ('Til Death)
May 17	Carlos Peña	Broadcaster
May 22	Ginnifer Goodwin	Actress (Ed, Big Love, Once Upon a Time)
May 24	Bryan Greenberg	Actor (October Road), (How to Make It in America)
May 26	Benji Gregory	Actor (ALF) (died 2024)
May 26	Adam Robitel	Director, producer, screenwriter, and actor
May 27	Cindy Sampson	Canadian actress (Supernatural)
May 28	Jake Johnson	Actor (New Girl)
June 1	Link Neal	TV host
June 2	Justin Long	Actor (Ed)
June 2	Nikki Cox	Actress (Unhappily Ever After, Las Vegas)
June 4	Robin Taylor	Actor (Gotham)
June 5	Nick Kroll	Actor, comedian and writer (The League, Kroll Show)
June 5	Rob Nelson	Afternoon anchor for Newsy, Scripps Television's all news channel
June 6	Judith Barsi	Actress (d. 1988)
June 7	Bill Hader	Actor and comedian (Saturday Night Live, South Park, Documentary Now!)
June 8	Maria Menounos	Actress
June 9	Michaela Conlin	Actress (Bones)
June 9	Brian Patrick Wade	Actor
June 10	Shane West	Actor (Once and Again, ER, Nikita)
June 10	DJ Qualls	Actor (Legit)
June 11	Joshua Jackson	Canadian actor (Dawson's Creek, Fringe)
June 12	Shiloh Strong	Actor
June 12	Timothy Simons	Actor (Veep)
June 12	Jeremy Rowley	Actor
June 13	Bianna Golodryga	Moldovan-born American journalist
June 15	Ethan Embry	Actor (Brotherhood)
June 18	Tara Platt	Voice actress (Naruto, Bleach, Ben 10: Omniverse)
June 19	Dirk Nowitzki	NBA basketball player
June 19	Zoe Saldaña	Actress
June 19	Mía Maestro	Actress and singer
June 20	Mike Birbiglia	Actor
June 20	Quinton Jackson	Actor
June 21	Erica Durance	Canadian actress (Smallville, Saving Hope)
June 24	Geoff Keighley	Canadian gaming TV presenter (GT.TV, G4tv.com, Spike Video Game Awards)
June 26	Tory Mussett	Actress
June 27	Courtney Ford	Actress
June 29	Lenard McKelvey	Media Personality (Uncommon Sense with Charlamagne, Hell of A Week)
June 29	Luke Kirby	Actor
June 29	Nicole Scherzinger	Singer
July 1	Hillary Tuck	Actress (Honey, I Shrunk the Kids: The TV Show)
July 2	Owain Yeoman	Actor
July 4	Becki Newton	Actress (Ugly Betty, The Goodwin Games)
July 4	Andrea Gabriel	Actress (Lost)
July 6	Adam Busch	Actor (The Mystery Files of Shelby Woo, Buffy the Vampire Slayer, Men at Work)
July 6	Tamera Mowry	Actress (Sister, Sister, Strong Medicine, Tia & Tamera)
July 6	Tia Mowry	Actress (Sister, Sister, Bratz, The Game, Tia & Tamera, Instant Mom)
July 8	Rachael Lillis	Actress
July 9	Linda Park	South Korean actress (Star Trek: Enterprise)
July 9	Sundance Head	Singer (American Idol, The Voice)
July 9	Kyle Davis	Actor
July 11	Jeremy Rowley	Actor (iCarly, Bunsen Is a Beast)
July 12	Michelle Rodriguez	Actress (Lost)
July 12	Topher Grace	Actor (That '70s Show)
July 13	Jessica Barth	Actress
July 15	Greg Sestero	Actor
July 18	Eddie Matos	Actor (Port Charles)
July 19	Ginifer King	Actress (The Haunted Hathaways)
July 19	Mark Proksch	Actor
July 19	Marcela Valladolid	American chef
July 21	Josh Hartnett	Actor
July 21	Justin Bartha	Actor
July 22	A. J. Cook	Actress (Higher Ground, Criminal Minds)
July 24	Jeff Mauro	Co-host of the Food Network series The Kitchen
August 2	Natashia Williams	Actress (Romeo!)
August 3	Shanelle Workman	Actress
August 6	Marisa Miller	Actress
August 8	Countess Vaughn	Actress and singer (Moesha, The Parkers)
August 15	Jennie Eisenhower	Actress
August 18	Andy Samberg	Actor and comedian (Saturday Night Live, Brooklyn Nine-Nine)
August 20	Noah Bean	Actor (Damages, Nikita)
August 22	James Corden	English comedian and host (The Late Late Show)
August 23	Kobe Bryant	NBA basketball player (died 2020)
August 24	Beth Riesgraf	Actress (Leverage, Caper)
August 25	Kel Mitchell	Actor (All That, Kenan & Kel, Clifford the Big Red Dog, One on One, Pink Panther and Pals, Wild Grinders, Game Shakers)
August 26	Amanda Schull	Actress (Pretty Little Liars, Suits, 12 Monkeys)
August 28	Kelly Overton	Actress (All My Children, True Blood, Legends)
August 28	Rachel Kimsey	Actress (The Young and the Restless, Justice League Action)
August 29	Danielle Hampton	Actress
September 4	Wes Bentley	Actor (American Horror Story)
September 6	Mathew Horne	Actor
September 7	Devon Sawa	Actor
September 12	Ben McKenzie	Actor (The O.C., Southland, Gotham)
September 12	Ruben Studdard	Singer and actor
September 13	Megan Henning	Actress (7th Heaven)
September 16	Michael Mosley	Actor (Scrubs, Pan Am, Sirens)
September 16	Matthew Rogers	American television host
September 17	Nick Cordero	Actor (died 2020)
September 18	Billy Eichner	Actor
September 20	Charlie Weber	Actor (How to Get Away with Murder)
September 22	Daniella Alonso	Actress (Revolution, The Night Shift)
September 23	Keri Lynn Pratt	Actress (Jack & Bobby)
September 23	Josh Miller	Filmmaker
September 23	Anthony Mackie	Actor
September 25	Rossif Sutherland	Actor
September 28	Peter Cambor	Actor (NCIS: Los Angeles)
September 28	Nikki McKibbin	Singer (Popstars, American Idol) (died 2020)
October 1	Katie Aselton	Actress
October 1	Nicole Atkins	Singer-songwriter
October 3	Shannyn Sossamon	Actress
October 3	Jake Shears	Singer
October 3	Christian Coulson	Actor
October 4	Dana Davis	Actress (Heroes, 10 Things I Hate About You, Franklin & Bash)
October 4	Phillip Glasser	Actor
October 4	Mark Day	Actor
October 5	James Valentine	American musician
October 5	Morgan Webb	TV host
October 5	Jesse Palmer	TV host
October 7	Omar Benson Miller	Actor (CSI: Miami, Ballers, Rise of the Teenage Mutant Ninja Turtles)
October 10	Jodi Lyn O'Keefe	Actress (Nash Bridges, Prison Break)
October 14	Usher	Singer and Actor
October 15	Devon Gummersall	Actor (My So-Called Life)
October 16	Kala Savage	Actress
October 16	Novie Edwards	Actress and singer (Cyberchase, Total Drama Island)
October 17	Erin Karpluk	Canadian actress (Being Erica)
October 18	Wesley Jonathan	Actor (City Guys, What I Like About You, The Soul Man)
October 18	Jake Farrow	American television writer and actor
October 20	Dionne Quan	Voice actress (Rugrats, The Fairly OddParents, All Grown Up!, Bratz)
October 20	David Caspe	American film and television writer
October 21	Will Estes	Actor (American Dreams, Blue Bloods)
October 21	Michael McMillian	Actor (What I Like About You, True Blood, Hot in Cleveland)
October 22	Zuzanna Szadkowski	Polish-American actress (Gossip Girl)
October 25	Zachary Knighton	Actor
October 26	CM Punk	Actor
October 27	David Walton	Actor (New Girl, About a Boy)
October 28	Gwendoline Christie	English actress (Wizards vs Aliens, Game of Thrones) and singer
October 28	Justin Guarini	Singer
October 30	Matthew Morrison	Actor (Glee)
October 31	Brian Hallisay	Actor (Privileged, The Client List, Revenge)
November 1	Mary Kate Schellhardt	Actress
November 2	Erika Flores	Actress (Dr. Quinn, Medicine Woman)
November 6	Nicole Dubuc	Actress (Major Dad, Young Justice)
November 6	Taryn Manning	Actress
November 6	Erik Cole	Former professional ice hockey left winger
November 9	Sisqó	Actor
November 10	Eve	Rapper and actress (Eve)
November 10	Diplo	DJ
November 10	David Paetkau	Canadian actor (Flashpoint)
November 12	Ashley Williams	Actress (As the World Turns, Good Morning, Miami, The Jim Gaffigan Show)
November 15	Samantha Shelton	Actress (Monarch Cove)
November 17	Zoë Bell	New Zealand actress
November 17	Tom Ellis	Actor
November 17	Rachel McAdams	Actress (True Detective)
November 18	Daniel Chong	Animator
November 19	Eric Nenninger	Actor (Malcolm in the Middle)
November 19	Chad Doreck	Voice actor (Brad Carbunkle on My Life as a Teenage Robot)
November 19	Lil' Mo	American R&B singer
November 20	Nadine Velazquez	Actress (My Name is Earl, The League, Major Crimes) and model
November 24	Katherine Heigl	Actress (Roswell, Grey's Anatomy, State of Affairs)
November 28	Aimee Garcia	Actress (Greetings from Tucson, All About the Andersons, George Lopez, Dexter)
November 29	Lauren German	Actress (Chicago Fire)
November 30	Clay Aiken	Singer (American Idol, Celebrity Apprentice)
December 1	Jen Psaki	MSNBC political analyst and former press secretary
December 2	Nelly Furtado	Singer
December 3	Trina	Rapper
December 7	Shiri Appleby	Actress (Roswell, Life UneXpected, UnREAL)
December 8	Ian Somerhalder	Actor (Smallville, Lost, The Vampire Diaries)
December 9	Jesse Metcalfe	Actor (Passions, Desperate Housewives)
December 10	Summer Phoenix	Actress
December 11	Minty Lewis	Voice actress (Eileen on Regular Show)
December 12	Gbenga Akinnagbe	Actor (The Wire)
December 13	B.J. Penn	Mixed martial artist
December 18	Josh Dallas	Actor (Once Upon a Time)
December 18	Ravi Patel	Actor
December 18	Katie Holmes	Actress (Dawson's Creek, The Kennedys)
December 19	Patrick Casey	Actor
December 20	Amanda Swisten	Actress
December 22	Joanne Kelly	Actress
December 22	Anthony Jeselnik	Comedian
December 23	Estella Warren	Canadian actress
December 28	John Legend	Actor
December 30	Michael Grimm	Singer
December 30	Tyrese Gibson	Singer

== Deaths ==
Date	Name	Age	Notability
January 13	Hubert Humphrey	66	American politician
February 28	Zara Cully	86	Actress (Mother Olivia Jefferson on The Jeffersons)
March 18	Peggy Wood	86	Actress (One Life to Live)
April 22	Will Geer	76	Actor (Grandpa Walton on The Waltons)
May 21	Bruce Geller	47	Screenwriter, producer (Mannix)
June 29	Bob Crane	49	Actor (Col. Hogan on Hogan's Heroes)
July 3	James Daly	59	Actor (Dr. Paul Lochner on Medical Center)
September 7	Keith Moon	32	English drummer (The Who)

== See also ==
- 1978 in the United States
- List of American films of 1978
