= Wayne's World: Music from the Motion Picture =

Soundtrack album by Various Artists
- Released: February 18, 1992
- Recorded: 1966–1992
- Genres: Hard rock; glam metal; soft rock
- Length: 59:59
- Label: Reprise
- Producers: Ted Templeman, Michael Ostin

Professional ratings
Review scores
Source	Rating
AllMusic	4.5/5 stars
Los Angeles Times	2.5/4 stars

Wayne's World: Music from the Motion Picture is the soundtrack album for the 1992 comedy film Wayne's World, released on February 18, 1992. The album was certified double-Platinum by the RIAA on July 16, 1997.

== Track listing ==
1. "Bohemian Rhapsody" - Queen (5:58)
2. "Hot and Bothered" - Cinderella (4:17)
3. "Rock Candy" - BulletBoys (5:04)
4. "Dream Weaver" (re-recorded version) - Gary Wright (4:26)
5. "Sikamikanico" - Red Hot Chili Peppers (3:26)
6. "Time Machine" - Black Sabbath (4:19)
7. "Wayne's World Theme" (extended version) - Mike Myers/Dana Carvey (5:14)
8. "Ballroom Blitz" - Tia Carrere (originally recorded by The Sweet) (3:30)
9. "Foxy Lady" - The Jimi Hendrix Experience (3:19)
10. "Feed My Frankenstein" - Alice Cooper (4:46)
11. "Ride With Yourself" - Rhino Bucket (3:15)
12. "Loving Your Lovin'" - Eric Clapton (3:55)
13. "Why You Wanna Break My Heart" - Tia Carrere (originally recorded by Dwight Twilley) (3:33)
14. "Loud Love" - Soundgarden (not included on all versions) (4:57)

Songs featured in the film but not included on the soundtrack album:

- "Cold Chills" - Kix
- "Everything About You" - Ugly Kid Joe
- "Fire" - Tia Carrere (originally recorded by The Jimi Hendrix Experience; Carrere's version has never been commercially released)
- "Making Our Dreams Come True" - Cyndi Grecco
- "All Night Thing" - Temple of the Dog
- "Touch Me" - Tia Carrere (originally recorded by Private Life; Carrere's version has never been commercially released)
- "Happy Birthday, Mr. President" - Mike Myers (originally sung by Marilyn Monroe)
- "Theme from Mission: Impossible" - Lalo Schifrin
- "Romeo and Juliet" - Pyotr Ilyich Tchaikovsky

== Charts ==
=== Weekly charts ===
Chart (1992)	Peak position
Australian Albums (ARIA)	15
Canada Top Albums/CDs (RPM)	1
German Albums (Offizielle Top 100)	15
New Zealand Albums (RMNZ)	18
Swedish Albums (Sverigetopplistan)	42
Swiss Albums (Schweizer Hitparade)	21
US Billboard 200	1

=== Year-end charts ===
Chart (1992)	Position
Canada Top Albums/CDs (RPM)	19
US Billboard 200	33

== Certifications ==
Region	Certification	Certified units/sales
Canada (Music Canada)	Platinum	100,000^{^}
United States (RIAA)	2× Platinum	2,000,000^{^}
^{^} Shipments figures based on certification alone.
