= The Last Resort (American TV series) =

- Genre: Sitcom
- Created by: Gary David Goldberg
- Directed by: Asaad Kelada
- Starring: (See article)
- Composer: Hod David Schudson
- Country of origin: United States
- Original language: English
- No. of seasons: 1
- No. of episodes: 15 (+ unaired pilot)

Production
- Producer: Gary David Goldberg
- Running time: 30 minutes
- Production company: MTM Enterprises

Original release
- Network: CBS
- Release: September 19, 1979 – March 17, 1980

The Last Resort is an American sitcom centered on a group of college students working in a hotel kitchen; the humor was in the style of Animal House, and it ran for one season of 15 episodes on CBS.

== Cast ==
- Larry Breeding as Michael Lerner
- Robert Costanzo as Murray
- Stephanie Faracy as Gail Collins
- John Fujioka as Kevin
- Dorothy Konrad as Mrs. Trilling
- Zane Lasky as Duane Kaminsky
- Walter Olkewicz as Zach Comstock
- Ray Underwood as Jeffrey Barron

== Episodes ==
=== Pilot ===
Title	Original release date
"Pilot"	Unaired

=== Season 1 (1979–80) ===
No.	Title	Directed by	Written by	Original release date
1	"Here Comes the Bride"	Asaad Kelada	Lloyd Garver & Donald Reiker	September 19, 1979
Pastry chef Gail Collins concocts an improbable story to impress one of the students. The bride (Beverly) played by Gail Edwards.
2	"Zach in Love"	Asaad Kelada	Patricia Jones & Donald Reiker	September 26, 1979
Michael's intercession with a girl on Zach's behalf surprises everyone.
3	"Let Them Eat Cake"	Asaad Kelada	Unknown	October 3, 1979
There's chaos in the kitchen when a mouse is found dead with cake batter clinging to its whiskers.
4	"Girlfriends"	Asaad Kelada	Patricia Jones & Donald Reiker	December 17, 1979
On a singles weekend, Gail discovers that her visiting girlfriend's sexual inclinations have changed.
5	"High School Confidential"	Asaad Kelada	Lloyd Garver	December 24, 1979
Murray is having a nervous breakdown trying to earn a high school diploma at night school.
6	"A Very Little Romance"	Asaad Kelada	Patricia Jones & Donald Reiker	December 31, 1979
Gail and Michael would like to keep their little romance secret.
7	"And Murray Makes Three"	Asaad Kelada	Marty Nadler	January 7, 1980
A woman's husband shows up at the resort knowing all about his wife's affair with Murray.
8	"Not a Prayer"	Asaad Kelada	Rich Reinhart	January 21, 1980
Wise guy Zach falls for a visiting nun who has not yet taken her final vows.
9	"Father's Day"	Asaad Kelada	Patricia Jones & Donald Reiker	January 28, 1980
Michael's father (Ronny Cox) tries to buy his son's affections after an 18-year absence.
10	"Gone with a Whim"	Asaad Kelada	Unknown	February 4, 1980
A campaign is started to get Zach rehired after his firing by the hotel owner.
11	"The Price of Love"	Asaad Kelada	Lloyd Garver & Marty Nadler	February 11, 1980
Gail is repelled by a celebrant at a mortician's convention, but Michael falls for a guest from an even older profession.
12	"Is There a Doctor in the House?"	Asaad Kelada	Rich Reinhart	February 18, 1980
Pre-med student Michael loses self-confidence when a flu epidemic and a fatal heart attack occur in the resort.
13	"Dorm Window"	Asaad Kelada	Lloyd Garver, Gary David Goldberg & Marty Nadler	February 25, 1980
Michael is convinced that he witnessed a murder — until the victim shows up for breakfast.
14	"Whodunit?"	Asaad Kelada	Gary David Goldberg	March 10, 1980
Everyone is worried when $500 in tips is stolen.
15	"Zegelmania"	Asaad Kelada	Joanne Pagliaro	March 17, 1980
Duane's research colleague (Judd Hirsch) rigs the results of an experiment to get a grant.
