= Blansky's Beauties =

- Genre: Sitcom
- Created by: Garry Marshall; Bob Brunner; Arthur Silver
- Starring: Nancy Walker; Caren Kaye; Eddie Mekka; Scott Baio; Pat Morita
- Opening theme: "I Want It All" by Cyndi Grecco
- Composers: Charles Fox (pilot); Jack Hayes; Frank Comstock
- Country of origin: United States
- Original language: English
- No. of seasons: 1
- No. of episodes: 13

Production
- Executive producers: Garry Marshall; Edward K. Milkis; Thomas L. Miller
- Producers: Nick Abdo; Bruce Johnson; Garry Marshall
- Running time: 30 minutes
- Production companies: Miller-Milkis Productions; Henderson Productions; Paramount Television

Original release
- Network: ABC
- Release: February 12 – June 27, 1977

Related
- Laverne & Shirley; Mork & Mindy; Who's Watching the Kids? Out of the Blue; Joanie Loves Chachi

Blansky's Beauties is an American sitcom television series and ostensible spin-off of Happy Days that aired on ABC from February 12 to June 27, 1977. The title character was played by Nancy Walker, introduced on an episode of Happy Days, then set in the early 1960s, then jumping to her life in Las Vegas in 1977 for this new series. The series was a rare ratings flop for producer Garry Marshall and was cancelled after only 13 episodes.

== Synopsis ==
Nancy Walker played Howard Cunningham's visiting cousin, Nancy Blansky from Las Vegas, on the February 4, 1977 episode "The Third Anniversary Show", of the series Happy Days. Blansky's Beauties premiered the following week, on February 12, 1977.

Nancy Blansky was a longtime Las Vegas showbiz vet (since the 1950s) and current den mother to a bevy of Las Vegas showgirls. In addition to keeping order in the chaotic apartment complex where they all lived, Nancy staged the girls' big numbers at the Oasis Hotel.

Emilio, the maître d', was Nancy's boyfriend. To help Nancy defray costs of her apartment, Ethel "Sunshine" Akalino and Bambi shared it with her, along with her nephews Joey DeLuca, a choreographer, and leering, 12-year-old ("going on 28") Anthony DeLuca. Anthony was forever trying to impress Bambi, who much to his chagrin treated him like a kid brother, as did almost all of Nancy's girls. Also sharing Nancy's apartment was a huge Great Dane named Blackjack who was shown in the opening credits playing blackjack.

== Links to parent show and other spin-offs ==
Eddie Mekka's character Joey DeLuca was a younger cousin to Carmine Ragusa, Mekka's 1950s-era character on Laverne & Shirley. During the production of Blansky's Beauties, Mekka continued in his starring roles on both series, a rare occurrence of one actor assuming two regular scripted roles, in two different prime-time series, at the same time. The series' star, Nancy Walker, had just finished several seasons of the same situation in which she had co-starred simultaneously in both McMillan & Wife and Rhoda, while also maintaining her ongoing role as diner waitress Rosie, the spokeslady for Bounty paper towels, which she continued during Blansky's Beauties.

In episode 1 ("Blansky's Biking Beauty") Joey introduced Nancy Blansky to stunt motorcyclist Pinky Tuscadero (Roz Kelly), who was instantly hired for Nancy's stage show. Pinky wore the same outfit as in her Happy Days episodes, though her hair was now in a '70s-style shag cut.

The show also implied a link to the then-ongoing show Laverne & Shirley; in the episode "Nancy Remembers Laverne", Nancy recalls working with a clumsy girl named Laverne DeFazio (Penny Marshall's character on Laverne & Shirley) back around 1957. She discovered that, despite her clumsiness, Laverne was a great dancer and Nancy offered her a job on the spot, which Laverne declined.

Pat Morita, after the failure of his series Mr. T and Tina, was added to the cast as Arnold, the character he originated on Happy Days. Here he ran a coffee shop, whereas in Happy Days, he owned the diner. Morita would re-join the cast of Happy Days five years later, while his replacement on that series, Al Molinaro, would repeat Morita's career move at that time by joining another Happy Days spin-off, Joanie Loves Chachi.

After the end of Blansky's Beauties, Lynda Goodfriend and Scott Baio would join the cast of Happy Days at the start of the 1977–78 season. Goodfriend and Baio, along with their Blansky's Beauties co-stars Caren Kaye, Shirley Kirkes, and Elaine Bolton, would appear in a similarly plotted pilot, Legs, for NBC in 1978, using different character names. This project would be revised further and appear on the network as Who's Watching the Kids? in the fall of that year, lasting half a season.

Garry Marshall, creator of Blansky's Beauties and the aforementioned Happy Days, Laverne & Shirley, and Joanie Loves Chachi, et al., appeared as Nancy's employer, Mr. Smith. The theme song "I Want It All" was sung by Cyndi Grecco, who had also done the theme song for Laverne & Shirley, "Making Our Dreams Come True".

== Cast ==
Main cast:

- Nancy Walker as Nancy Blansky
- Caren Kaye as Bambi Benton
- Eddie Mekka as Joey DeLuca
- Scott Baio as Anthony DeLuca
- Pat Morita as Arnold
- Taaffe O'Connell as Hillary S. Prentiss
- Bond Gideon as Lovely Carson
- George Pentecost as Horace "Stubbs" Wilmington
- Johnny Desmond as Emilio
- Gerri Reddick as Jackie Outlaw

Recurring roles:

- Lynda Goodfriend as Ethel "Sunshine" Akalino
- Shirley Kirkes as Gladys "Cochise" Littlefeather
- Rhonda Bates as Arkansas
- Antoinette Yuskis as Sylvia Silver
- Jill Owens as Misty Karamazov

== Episodes ==
No.	Title	Directed by	Written by	Original release date
1	"Blansky's Biking Beauty"	Garry Marshall	Warren S. Murray	February 12, 1977
Nancy needs to come up with a new show finale and hires Pinky Tuscadero (Roz Kelly) to jump her motorcycle over the showgirls.
2	"Blansky for the Defense"	Jerry Paris	Chris Thompson & Judy Ervin & Marc Sotkin	February 19, 1977
Nancy makes a valiant effort to create the semblance of a normal life when juvenile authorities come to investigate Anthony's living environment.
3	"Nancy's Magic Moment"	Jerry Paris	David Ketchum & Tony DiMarco	February 26, 1977
Nancy threatens to quit when she's ordered to have the showgirls perform topless.
4	"Nancy's Cover-Up"	Jerry Paris	Bob Keats & Steven Zacharias	March 12, 1977
When valuables disappear from the showgirls' room while they're on stage, Nancy turns detective to catch the thief.
5	"Nancy Goes Sheik"	Jerry Paris	Arnold Kane	March 19, 1977
Nancy comes to the rescue when a much-married sheik zeroes in on Bambi as his next wife.
6	"Anthony Falls in Love"	Jerry Paris	Arthur Silver	March 26, 1977
Anthony proposes marriage to Bambi after Nancy agrees that she should settle down with a strong man.
7	"Nancy Meets Francie"	Alan Rafkin	Bob Brunner	April 2, 1977
Nancy meets Sunshine's mother, Francie Akalino, who's seeking to take her daughter back to Wichita so that she can get married.
8	"Nancy Remembers Laverne"	Jerry Paris	Roger Garrett	April 9, 1977
Nancy meets Laverne DeFazio (Penny Marshall) while on a talent hunt in Milwaukee.
9	"Nancy Meets Pa Bates"	Jerry Paris	Joe Glauberg	April 16, 1977
Arkansas' father visits Las Vegas and quickly loses not only his money, but his daughter's as well.
10	"My Nephew's Debut"	Jerry Paris	Holly Mascott	April 30, 1977
Nancy desperately searches for a way to hitch a ride back to Las Vegas for Joey's stage debut.
11	"Dear Nancy..."	Alan Rafkin	Fred Fox Jr.	May 21, 1977
Bambi falls in love with a socially prominent lawyer and Nancy begins fearing the worst.
12	"To Nancy with Love"	Alan Rafkin	Warren S. Murray	June 7, 1977
Nancy accepts an executive position at a plush hotel, but quickly gets bored and longs for the disorganization at the Oasis.
13	"Nancy Breaks a Leg"	Alan Rafkin	Warren S. Murray	June 27, 1977
Nancy goes to the hospital after breaking her leg, but fails to get much rest and relaxation.

== See also ==
- List of television shows set in Las Vegas
