= Jenny Bowen =

Jennifer or Jenny Bowen may refer to:

== People ==
- Jenny Bowen (filmmaker), American screenwriter, director, and founder of OneSky
- Jennifer Bowen, featured on true crime series Snapped
- Jennifer Bowen, Miss America's Outstanding Teen state pageants

== Fictional characters ==
- Jenny Bowen, character in Best Friends Together
- Jenny Bowen, character, love interest of Steve Smith (American Dad!)
