= Larry Breeding =

American actor (1946–1982)

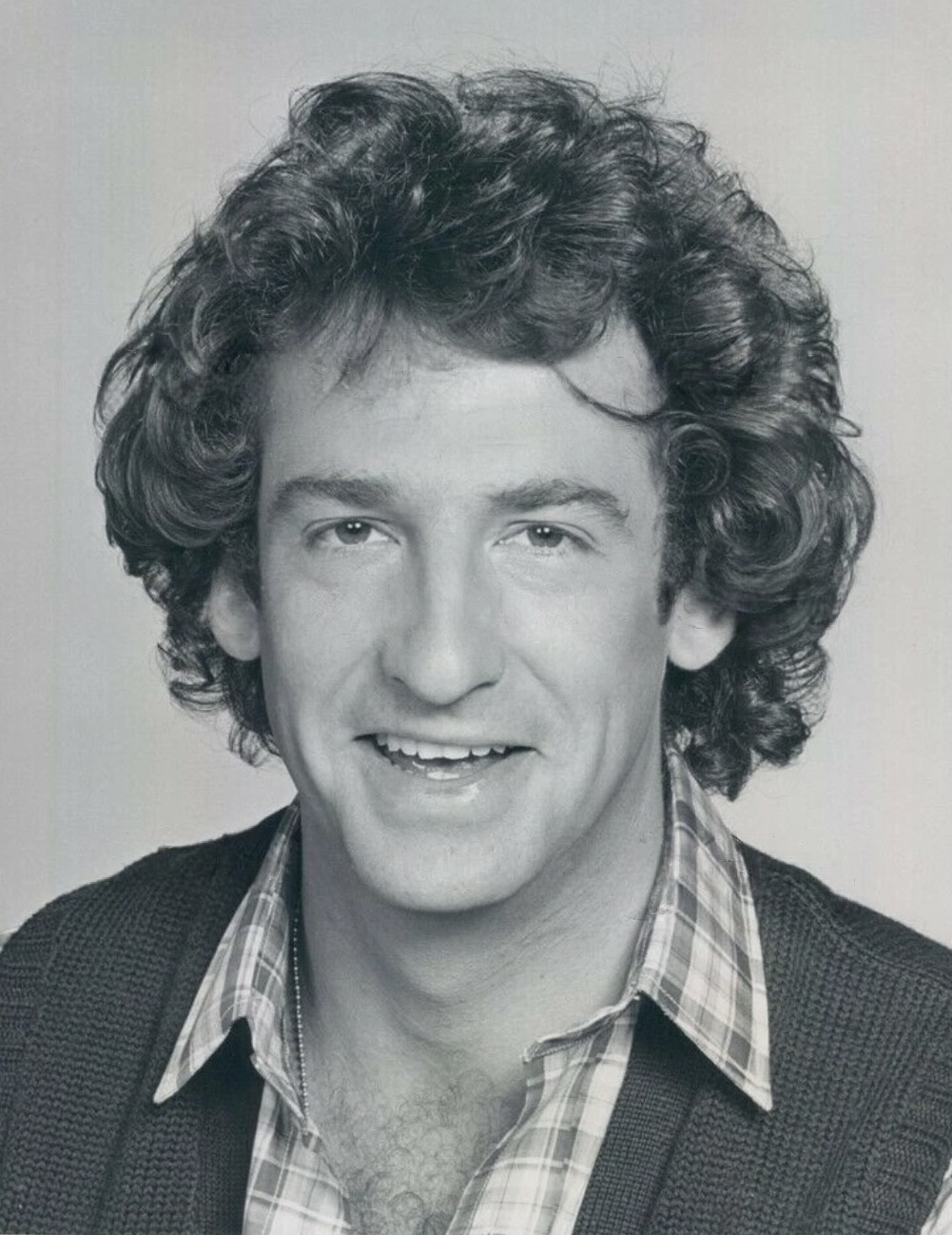
- Breeding in The Last Resort, 1979
- Born: September 28, 1946; Winchester, Illinois, U.S.
- Died: September 28, 1982 (aged 36); Los Angeles, California, U.S.
- Occupation: Actor
- Years active: 1975–1982
- Spouse: Anne Bloom (m. 1979)

Larry Breeding (September 28, 1946 – September 28, 1982) was an American actor who had starring roles in the NBC sitcom Who's Watching the Kids? (1978–79) and the CBS comedy The Last Resort (1979–80). He also appeared in Laverne & Shirley and numerous guest roles on network television during the late 1970s and early 1980s. A charismatic performer with a dry wit and self-effacing humor, Breeding was regarded by critics as a rising comic actor before his career was cut short by his death in a 1982 automobile accident.

== Early life and education ==
Larry Breeding was born in Winchester, Illinois, and grew up on his family’s farm, affectionately called "Belly Acres." His father was a farmer who later became a banker, and his mother a homemaker. Breeding frequently cited his rural upbringing for instilling his work ethic and humor, saying, "My father always wanted to give his children things he never had… growing up in Illinois, I always ranked ‘mice over money.’"

He attended MacMurray College in Jacksonville, Illinois, graduating with a degree in theatre. During summers, he apprenticed at the Little Theatre on the Square in Sullivan, Illinois, a well-known regional venue where he worked from 1968 to 1969. His early stage experience there, he later said, “taught me more than any classroom ever could.”

== Career ==
Before gaining attention on television, Breeding worked extensively in national advertising, appearing in over 150 commercials for products such as Haggar slacks, Chevrolet, and Dr. Pepper. His role as the “Haggar slacks man” made him a familiar face to American audiences. He also modeled professionally and held various jobs, including walking dogs and selling neckties at Saks Fifth Avenue while pursuing acting in New York.

Breeding’s first film appearance came in The Happy Hooker (1975), playing one of the “Johns” opposite Lynn Redgrave. He also gained early stage credits in Chicago and on Broadway before relocating to Los Angeles in the late 1970s.

In 1978, Breeding was cast by NBC president Fred Silverman in the sitcom Who’s Watching the Kids?, produced by Garry Marshall. The series, centered on struggling performers in Las Vegas, featured Jim Belushi, Caren Kaye, and Marcia Lewis alongside Breeding as Larry Parnell.

Breeding remained philosophical about the show’s failure, calling it “shotgun television. His easy charm and Silverman’s support, however, led to further opportunities.

In 1979, Breeding earned his breakthrough role as Michael Lerner, a waiter and medical student, in the CBS comedy The Last Resort, produced by Gary David Goldberg and MTM Enterprises (The Mary Tyler Moore Show, Lou Grant). The ensemble cast included Stephanie Faracy, Robert Costanzo, and John Fujitake.

Critics described the show as “bright, fast, and refreshing,” and Breeding’s performance as “boyish but clever.” Breeding, who had appeared in three failed pilots before, quipped that he was a “flop-up”—an actor who “moves up regardless of how bad his last show was.”

Breeding’s humor and self-awareness made him a favorite among writers. He credited his stage training for his improvisation skills, saying, “On stage, if you can’t remember your lines, you still have to go on. That’s why television feels like play rather than work.”

In 1982, he joined the cast of Laverne & Shirley for several episodes as Mike Bailly, Laverne’s boyfriend, reuniting him with Penny Marshall, who had attended his Illinois stage performances earlier that year.

Breeding was also active in summer theatre, performing in the play Deathtrap at the Little Theatre on the Square, where Penny Marshall traveled to see him perform.

Breeding’s comedic approach was described as dry, intelligent, and self-aware. He preferred “observational humor to sarcasm,” striving to make his characters relatable without cynicism. Critics frequently compared him to Tony Randall and praised his blend of warmth and wit.

== Personal life ==
Breeding married actress Anne Bloom in May 1979. The couple lived in the Hollywood Hills, where, according to Breeding, “I get up in the morning, see the Hollywood sign, and it yells, ‘Work! Work! You have to pay for me!’”

He was known among peers for his humor and generosity, and remained active in theatre and comedy until his death.

== Death ==
Larry Breeding died in a traffic accident in Los Angeles, California, on September 28, 1982, his 36th birthday. According to the Los Angeles Times, his car, a 1974 Jensen, struck a center divider at Franklin Avenue and Vine Street in Hollywood.

== Filmography ==
=== Television ===
Year	Title	Role	Notes
1978	Man from Atlantis	Buddy O’Toole	1 episode
1979	The Love Tapes	Peter Barnes	TV movie
1979	Alice	Mark	1 episode
1979	The Bad News Bears	Elliot Carson	1 episode
1978–1979	Who's Watching the Kids?	Larry Parnell	11 episodes
1979–1980	The Last Resort	Michael Lerner	15 episodes
1980	Eight Is Enough	Gary	1 episode
1980–1981	The Love Boat	Johnny Gilmore / Jack Standers	2 episodes
1981	A Matter of Life and Death	Unknown Role	TV movie
1981	Hart to Hart	Frank Jordan	1 episode
1981	It's a Living	Stan	1 episode
1981	Lou Grant	Burton Cary	1 episode
1982	This Is Kate Bennett...	Seth Greenwald	TV movie
1982	It’s Not Easy	Neil Townsend	1 episode
1982–1983	Laverne & Shirley	Mike Bailly / Mike / Hank	3 episodes

=== Film ===
Year	Title	Role	Notes
1975	The Happy Hooker	One of The Johns	
1981	Street Music	Eddie	
1982	Young Doctors in Love	Unknown Role	uncredited
