= Satan's Princess =

- Directed by: Bert I. Gordon
- Screenplay by: Stephen Katz
- Produced by: Bert I. Gordon
- Starring: Robert Forster; Lydie Denier; Caren Kaye; Phillip Glasser
- Cinematography: Thomas F. Denove
- Edited by: Barbara Boguski
- Music by: Norman Mamey
- Production company: Sun Heat Productions
- Distributed by: Paramount Home Entertainment
- Release date: December 1, 1989
- Running time: 90 minutes
- Country: United States
- Language: English

Satan's Princess is a 1989 film directed by Bert I. Gordon and starring Robert Forster and Lydie Denier.

== Plot ==
The title character Nicole St. James is the head of a modeling agency for women, and who has hired Karen Rhodes, a runaway girl to help her. Police officer Lou Cherney goes undercover to find the runaway, but the evil 'princess' Nicole catches on to him and the investigation.

== Cast ==
- Robert Forster as Lou Cherney
- Lydie Denier as Nicole St. James
- Caren Kaye as Leah Cherney
- Phillip Glasser as Joey Cherney
- Michael Harris as Dorian
- Ellen Geer as Mary Kulik
- Rena Riffel as Erica Dunn
- Jack Carter as Old Priest
- Henry Brown as Felson
- Marlena Giovi as Betty Calabrese
- Al Pugliese as Sal Calabrese
- Nick Agnotti as Ed Rhodes
- Leslie Huntly as Karen Rhodes

== Production ==
Satan's Princess went through many titles during production including Heat From Another Sun, Princess of Darkness, and Malediction.

== Release ==
Satan's Princess was released directly to video in the United States.

== Reception ==
In a contemporary review, Variety noted that "mundane performances lift this mundane direct-to-video release," noting that Robert Forster, Lydie Denier, and Caren Kaye all "deserve more challenging assignments than this potboiler."

== Bibliography ==
- Prouty, Howard H., ed. (1994). Variety Television Reviews 1923-1992. Garland Publishing Inc. ISBN 0-8240-3796-0.
