= Who's Watching the Kids? =

American sitcom

- Who's Watching the Kids? opening title
- Genre: Sitcom
- Starring: Caren Kaye; Marcia Lewis; Scott Baio; Lynda Goodfriend; Tammy Lauren; James Belushi; Larry Breeding
- Composer: Charles Bernstein
- Country of origin: United States
- Original language: English
- No. of seasons: 1
- No. of episodes: 15 (6 unaired)

Production
- Executive producers: Garry Marshall; Anthony W. Marshall; Don Silverman
- Running time: 30 minutes
- Production companies: Henderson Productions; Paramount Television

Original release
- Network: NBC
- Release: September 22 – December 15, 1978

Who's Watching the Kids? is an American sitcom produced by Garry Marshall which aired on NBC from September 22, 1978, to December 15, 1978. The series focused on two young Las Vegas showgirls, working and rooming together, who each had a younger sibling living with them.

The series originated as the pilot special Legs, which NBC aired on May 19, 1978. Following the pilot, the series was a ratings flop and was cancelled after only 9 aired episodes.

== Synopsis ==
Stacy Turner (Caren Kaye) and Angie Vitola (Lynda Goodfriend) are showgirls at Club Sand Pile in Las Vegas tasked with raising their younger siblings — Angie's 15-year-old brother Frankie (Scott Baio) and Stacy's 9-year-old sister Melissa (Tammy Lauren). Frankie and Melissa are frequent troublemakers, scheming to access everything Sin City has to offer. Frankie styles himself as "the Fox" to gain opportunities to make time with the other women who performed at Club Sand Pile.

Stacy and Angie divided their time between their careers and keeping the kids behaving properly, but it was always a challenge. They received help from their next door neighbor, aspiring journalist Larry Parnell (Larry Breeding), to watch the kids while they were at work. Larry's role alternated between family friend and foe, as he often had to chase Frankie and Melissa around in the midst of their scrapes. The two liked Larry, but they always tried to avoid supervision. Larry hoped someday to become a successful writer/reporter, but in the meantime had only made it to covering garden and weather reports at local TV station KVGS (no relation to the real radio station KVGS). Larry's friend and main cameraman at KVGS, the klutzy Bert Gunkel (James Belushi), also lived in the building and often helped Larry keep an eye on Frankie and Melissa.

Mitzi Logan (Marcia Lewis), the heavyset host and owner of Club Sand Pile, was also their landlady. Memphis O'Hara (Lorrie Mahaffey) was a singer at the club, and was the most prominent object of Frankie's affection, although Frankie also made attempts to become friendly with Venus (Shirley Kirkes) and Bridget (Elaine Bolton), two other dancers at the club and close cohorts to Stacy and Angie.

== Cast ==
=== Main Cast ===
- Caren Kaye as Stacy Turner (episodes 1–3, plus pilot and unaired episodes)
- Marcia Lewis as Mitzi Logan
- Scott Baio as Frankie Vitola
- Lynda Goodfriend as Angie Vitola
- Tammy Lauren as Melissa Turner
- James Belushi as Bert Gunkel
- Larry Breeding as Larry Parnell

=== Recurring ===
- Lorrie Mahaffey as Memphis O'Hara
- Shirley Kirkes as Venus
- Elaine Bolton as Bridget

== Episodes ==
No.	Title	Directed by	Written by	Original release date
0	"Legs"	Alan Rafkin	Walter Kempley & Marty Nadler	May 19, 1978
1	"The Odd Family"	John Thomas Lenox	Howard Albrecht & Sol Weinstein	September 22, 1978
2	"Melissa Runs Away"	Ray DeVally Jr.	Sandra Kay Siegel	September 29, 1978
3	"Frankie Loves Memphis"	John Thomas Lenox	Fred Fox Jr.	October 6, 1978
4	"The Hostage"	Unknown	Unknown	October 20, 1978
5	"Love Finds Bert Gunkel"	Unknown	Unknown	November 3, 1978
6	"Rustic Retreat"	Ray DeVally Jr.	Richard Albrecht & Casey Keller	November 10, 1978
7	"Hit and Run"	Unknown	Roger Garrett	November 24, 1978
8	"Good News, Bad News"	Unknown	Unknown	December 8, 1978
9	"Frankie's 16th Birthday"	Unknown	Unknown	December 15, 1978
10	"Larry Moves In"	N/A	N/A	Unaired
11	"Jealousy, the Green-Eyed Monster"	N/A	N/A	Unaired
12	"Pose Poses Poser"	N/A	N/A	Unaired

== Development and connection to other Garry Marshall series ==
Who's Watching the Kids? cast.

Who's Watching the Kids? employed several actors who were already familiar faces from shows produced by Garry Marshall and his associates Thomas L. Miller and Edward K. Milkis. Those who had already worked with the producers were Caren Kaye, Lynda Goodfriend, Scott Baio, Shirley Kirkes and Elaine Bolton. These five originally appeared together as co-stars on Marshall's short-lived 1977 Happy Days spin-off Blansky's Beauties, which starred Nancy Walker. Blansky's Beauties had a very similar plot to what became Who's Watching the Kids?: a bevy of Las Vegas showgirls seeking fame and fortune under the watchful eye of den mother and choreographer Nancy Blansky (Walker). Kaye, Goodfriend, Kirkes and Bolton were four of Blansky's showgirls, and Baio, in his first TV series role, played Anthony DeLuca, a 12-year-old romeo who was always trying to score with the older beauties.

Blansky's Beauties was cancelled after half a season, but Marshall refused to give up on the idea of a sitcom with a Las Vegas showgirls theme. Marshall took the basis of Blansky's Beauties and retooled it for a new series concept, that mainly focused on a group of sexy young ladies trying to make it in the Vegas entertainment world, without the aid of an older confidant or the presence of children. The concept proved to be even more sexually-driven than Blansky's Beauties, and was given the title Legs. NBC was interested in the new project, and agreed to a pilot which would be aired in the spring of 1978 as a one-time special. If the special fared well in the ratings, they would commit to a weekly series. Four of the original Blansky beauties—Kaye, Goodfriend, Kirkes and Bolton—were hired back by Marshall to star in Legs. For Lynda Goodfriend, this was the second transition from one Marshall series to another. After the cancellation of Blansky's, Goodfriend took up Marshall's offer to join the cast of Happy Days as the 1977–78 season began, playing Lori Beth Allen, the new love interest of Richie Cunningham (Ron Howard). If Legs went on to be a successful series, it is presumed that Marshall would have written off the character of Lori Beth on Happy Days in order for Goodfriend to commit to her co-starring role on the new show.

Legs was successful as a one-time special when it aired in May 1978; therefore, NBC provided a berth for the series on its 1978 fall schedule. However, the network talked with Marshall about adding more of a family appeal to the sex-farce sitcom, which he eventually agreed to. Marshall added two young kids to the cast, and hired another one of his Happy Days actors away, Scott Baio, who had also joined the cast of that series in the fall of 1977, along with Lynda Goodfriend. Baio had become familiar to Happy Days viewers as Charles "Chachi" Arcola, cousin of Fonzie (Henry Winkler). He and young actress Tammy Lauren were entered into the fray of Legs as two kids who lived with their showgirl sisters. Only now, two showgirls instead of four would be the main focus; Kaye and Goodfriend were chosen to be the top-billing stars, while Kirkes and Bolton were relegated to smaller supporting roles. Marshall re-wrote the format so the kids could be well-integrated; the ultimate catch in the re-write was the dilemma Kaye and Goodfriend's characters faced as they were always busy in their performing career: "just who will be watching the kids?" This prompted the ultimate title change.

While the show is nominally about the showgirls, and their children, the intro tends focuses on the men (Belushi and Breeding) and the children, taking the focus away from the showgirl element and making it to appear more like a family show.
