= Lynda Goodfriend =

American actress

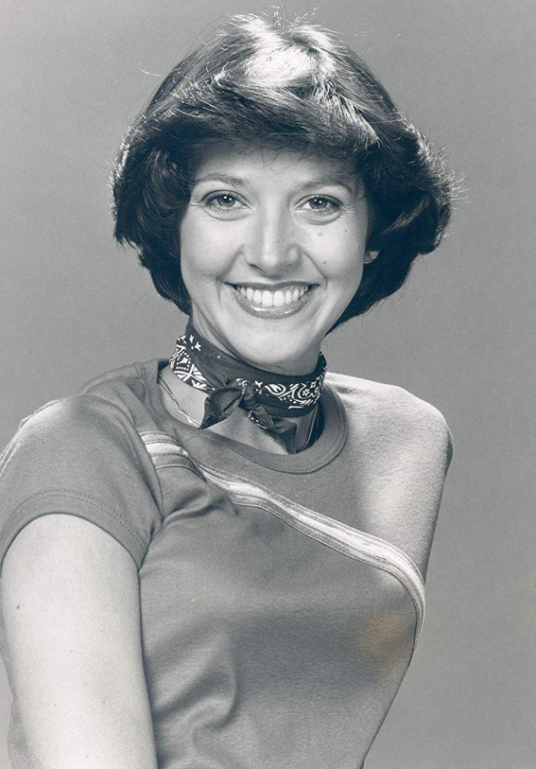
- Goodfriend in 1978
- Born: October 31, 1950 (age 75); Miami, Florida, U.S.
- Education: Southern Methodist University
- Occupation: Actress
- Years active: 1975–present
- Known for: Lori Beth Allen-Cunningham on Happy Days
- Spouse: Giora Litwak (m. 1982)
- Children: 1

Lynda Goodfriend (born October 31, 1950) is an American actress. Her credits include Blansky's Beauties (1977), Who's Watching the Kids? (1978), The Love Boat (1981, 1983), Fantasy Island (1982), Beaches (1988), Pretty Woman (1990), and Exit to Eden (1994). Her most notable role was playing Lori Beth Cunningham (née Allen), Richie's girlfriend then wife, on the TV sitcom Happy Days (1977-1984).

In 2011, she became 'Chair of the Acting Department' in the New York Film Academy.

== Early life and education ==
Born in Miami on October 31, 1950, Goodfriend is the middle child of three, born to Martha (née Joyce) and Frank Goodfriend Jr. She graduated from Coral Gables High School in Coral Gables, Florida and from Southern Methodist University in Dallas, where she received a degree in drama. She studied acting with Lee Strasberg and Sanford Meisner, also attended the Harvey Lembeck comedy workshop.

== Career ==
Goodfriend started her career as a professional dancer and singer 'Off Broadway' where she performed alongside John Travolta. On Broadway, she performed in Good News (1974).

She played Ethel "Sunshine" Akalino on the short-lived series Blansky's Beauties (1977). After that show left the air, she and co-star Scott Baio joined Happy Days in 1977. She originally played a guest role in the fourth season of Happy Days as Kim in "Time Capsule" and "Graduation (Part 1)", before returning to the show as Lori Beth in season five.

Goodfriend went on to play several parts in notable Garry Marshall films, playing a tourist in Pretty Woman (1990), as well as cameo and guest star roles in Exit to Eden, Nothing in Common and Beaches. During the mid to late 1980s, Goodfriend appeared in several independent projects, including An All Consuming Passion, a film written and directed by Kathryn Nesmith. Goodfriend directed the teleplay pilot Four Stars that was financed by Garry Marshall, and starred veteran actor Bert Kramer and actress Julie Paris. Most recently, she directed the short film The Perfect Crime in 2009.

Goodfriend started 'The Actors Workout' in North Hollywood, the Theatre District, where she developed two schools plus one Theatre. She became head of 'Young Artists Management' for some years, working with top acting talent. In 2006, she joined the New York Film Academy, as a teacher of acting, later to become 'Chair of the Acting Department' in 2011.

== Personal life ==
Goodfriend married Giora Litwak in 1982. They have a daughter named Peri. By 1986, Goodfriend was living separately from her husband and raising Peri as a single parent. She holds a BFA from Southern Methodist University and is the acting chair at the New York Film Academy.

== Filmography ==
Film
Year	Film	Role	Other notes
1984	An All Consuming Passion	Susan	AFI: Women in Film
1986	Four Stars	Lynn	Lee Strasberg Center
1986	Nothing in Common	Louise Pelham	
1988	Beaches	Mrs. Myandowski	
1990	Pretty Woman	Tourist Woman	
1994	Exit to Eden	Linda	
Television
Year	Title	Role	Notes
1977	Blansky's Beauties	Ethel "Sunshine" Akalino	6 episodes
1977–1984	Happy Days	Lori Beth Allen Cunningham/Kim	79 episodes (2 episodes as "Kim")
1978	Who's Watching the Kids?	Angie Vitola	11 episodes
1981, 1983	The Love Boat	Pam Madison; Cora Winnaker	2 episodes
1982	Fantasy Island	Kristy Lee	Episode: Dancing Lady/The Final Round
1988	Rosie	Sally Cartflight	Episode: Jailbreakers
