= Charles Cyphers =

American actor (1939–2024)

- Cyphers in The Betty White Show, 1977
- Born: July 28, 1939; Niagara Falls, New York, U.S.
- Died: August 4, 2024 (aged 85); Tucson, Arizona, U.S.
- Occupation: Actor
- Years active: 1972–2021

Charles George Cyphers (July 28, 1939 – August 4, 2024) was an American actor who is known in the horror movie community for his work in the films of John Carpenter, especially his role as Sheriff Leigh Brackett in Carpenter's 1978 movie Halloween. He reprised this role in the 1981 sequel Halloween II and the 2021 sequel Halloween Kills.

== Career ==
Cyphers's first feature film was the 1974 movie Truck Turner, and he first worked with Carpenter in the 1976 action film Assault on Precinct 13, in which he played Starker, one of the ill-fated police officers gunned down by gang members.

He later appeared as Sheriff Leigh Brackett in the 1978 hit horror movie Halloween. Cyphers worked with Carpenter two years later, playing Dan O'Bannon in The Fog, a 1980 horror film which also starred Tom Atkins, Cyphers's fellow Halloween cast member Jamie Lee Curtis, his Assault on Precinct 13 co-star Darwin Joston, and Nancy Kyes, who worked with Cyphers in both Assault on Precinct 13 and Halloween. He then played the Secretary of State in Carpenter's popular 1981 film Escape from New York, in which he appeared with Atkins and Halloween actress Nancy Stephens. He reprised the role of Sheriff Brackett in Halloween II.

In 2005, he appeared in the movie Dead Calling, and in 2007 he was set to appear in Ethan Dettenmaier's unreleased film, Sin-Jin Smyth, and in the film Methodic in a role which paid homage to his character in Halloween.

Cyphers later returned to the Halloween franchise, reprising the role of Brackett in the 2021 film Halloween Kills.

Cyphers appeared in numerous television productions. During the 1970s, he had a recurring role, as Hugo Muncy, in The Betty White Show, and he guest-starred in an episode of Gibbsville in 1976. In addition, he had guest roles in popular television series such as Barnaby Jones, Wonder Woman and The Dukes of Hazzard, and he played Drake in the 1977 mini series Roots.

More recently, Cyphers appeared in Sliders, ER, Seinfeld, JAG, and Any Day Now. From 1996 to 1998, Cyphers played Al Yaroker in the 1990s series Nick Freno: Licensed Teacher. He also acted in various made-for-television movies.

=== Other work ===
Cyphers' roles on the stage, both on- and off-Broadway, include 12 Angry Men, in which he portrayed "Juror #3" to Julie Cobb's "#2" (her father portrayed "#3" in the 1957 movie). Cyphers appeared on The Dating Game in 1967 to compete for a date with Yvonne Craig ("Batgirl" from the 1960s Batman TV series).

== Death ==
Cyphers died after a brief illness in Tucson, Arizona, on August 4, 2024, at the age of 85.

== Filmography ==
Film
Year	Title	Role	Notes
1972	Cool Breeze	Backstage Police Officer	Uncredited
1973	The Slams	Nicol	Uncredited
1974	Truck Turner	Drunk	
1976	Vigilante Force	Perry Beal	
1976	Assault on Precinct 13	Officer Starker	
1977	MacArthur	Brigadier General Forest Harding	
1978	Coming Home	Pee Wee	
1978	Gray Lady Down	Larson	
1978	Halloween	Sheriff Leigh Brackett	
1979	A Force of One	Dr. Eppis	
1979	The Onion Field	Chaplain	
1980	The Fog	Dan O'Bannon	
1980	Borderline	Ski	
1981	Escape from New York	Secretary of State	
1981	Halloween II	Sheriff Leigh Brackett	
1982	Death Wish II	Donald Kay	
1982	Honkytonk Man	Stubbs	
1982	Grizzly II: Revenge	Steve	
1986	Hunter's Blood	Woody	
1987	Big Bad Mama II	Stark	
1989	Major League	Charlie Donovan	
1989	Gleaming the Cube	Harvey McGill	
1993	Loaded Weapon 1	Interrogator	
1995	Murder in the First	Bailiff	Uncredited
2001	Mach 2	Harry Olson	
2001	Critical Mass	Henderson	
2006	Dead Calling	Chuck Walker	
2007	Methodic	Chief Sperranza	
2021	Halloween Kills	Leigh Brackett	Final film role

Television
Year	Title	Role	Notes
1972–1973	Cannon	Janniver's Accomplice/Corky Hill	2 episodes
1973–1975, 1977	Barnaby Jones	Various	4 episodes
1973	The F.B.I.	Charlie Wicker	Episode: "Break-In"
1974	The Manhunter	Emmett Crowley	Episode: "Death on the Run"
1974	The F.B.I. Story: The FBI Versus Alvin Karpis, Public Enemy Number One	Arthur 'Doc' Barker	TV film
1974	The Missiles of October	Press Photographer	TV film
1975	The Secrets of Isis	Sam Niles	Episode: "Fool's Dare"
1976	The Six Million Dollar Man	Faler	Seasons 3–4 (guest role, 3 episodes)
1976	The Bionic Woman	Faler	Episode: "The Return of Bigfoot Part 2"
1976	Phyllis	Coach Joe Cook	Episode: "Out of the Closet"
1976, 1978–1979	Starsky & Hutch	Various	3 episodes
1976	Gibbsville	Wingfield	Episode: "Trapped"
1977	Charlie's Angels	Haller	Episode: "Angels on a String"
1977	Roots	Fred Drake	Miniseries (episode 8)
1977	Wonder Woman	Kurt	Episode: "Wonder Woman in Hollywood"
1977	The Tony Randall Show	Eddie Foxworth	Episode: "Case: The People Speak"
1977	Dog and Cat	Loomis	Episode: "Dead Skunk"
1977	Our Town	Sam Craig	TV film
1977–1978	The Betty White Show	Hugo Muncy	Season 1 (recurring role, 14 episodes)
1977	The Trial of Lee Harvey Oswald	Michael Brandon	TV film
1978	Alice	Allen Wolf	Episode: "Close Encounters of the Worst Kind"
1978	Someone's Watching Me!	Gary Hunt	TV film
1979	Elvis	Sam Phillips	TV film
1979, 1984	The Dukes of Hazzard	Bumper/Phil	2 episodes
1979	Friendly Fire	Tom Loomis	TV film
1979	Lou Grant	Jerry Baldwin	Episode: "Charlatan"
1981	Hart to Hart	Lester	Episode: "Hart-Shaped Murder"
1982	The Quest	Peters	Episode: "Escape from a Velvet Box"
1982	Benson	Scotty	Episode: "Benson's Army Reunion"
1983	Memorial Day	Jack Ruskin	TV film
1983	Little House on the Prairie: Look Back to Yesterday	Zack Taylor	TV film
1984	Rituals	Dutch	Unknown episode(s)
1984	Airwolf	Joe Ganns	Episode: "HX-1"
1985, 1987	Hill Street Blues	Capt. Leder/Commander #1	3 episodes
1986	Matlock	Tom Coyle	Episode: "The Cop"
1987	Dallas	Bertram Pogue	2 episodes
1987	Our House	Fred Houston	Episode: "Past Tense, Future Tense Part 2"
1987	Santa Barbara	Sheriff	Episode 724
1987	Simon & Simon	Sergeant Lester	Episode: "New Cop in Town"
1988	Night Court	Leo	Episode: "Dan, the Walking Time Bomb"
1988	China Beach	The General	Episode: "Home"
1988	Aaron's Way		Episode: "Invisible People"
1988	21 Jump Street	Team Doctor	Episode: "Coach of the Year"
1989	Freddy's Nightmares	Ben Ostroff	Episode: "Dream Come True"
1989	Jake and the Fatman	Benny Kraus	Episode: Dancing in the Dark"
1989	Dragnet	Coach Simons	Episode: "The Connection"
1989	Mancuso, F.B.I.		Episode: "Weapons-Grade"
1990	The Outsiders		Episode: "Union Blues"
1991–1992	Roc	Mr. Samuels	2 episodes
1991	Murder, She Wrote	Lt. Timothy Chance	Episode: "Lines of Excellence"
1993	FBI: The Untold Stories	Sillous Huddleston	Episode: "Yablonski"
1993	Renegade	Zachary Quinn	Episode: "Honor Bound"
1993	Lois & Clark: The New Adventures of Superman	Thaddeus Roarke	Episode: "Honeymoon in Metropolis"
1994	California Dreams	Coach Cotler	Episode: "Can't Buy Me Love"
1994	seaQuest DSV	Calvin Shelley	Episode: "Higher Power"
1994	Hardball	Chuck	Pilot
1994	The George Carlin Show	Officer Bill Koski	3 episodes
1995	Sliders	Coach Almquist	Episode: "Eggheads"
1995	Deadly Games	General Barnicke	Episode: "The Camp Counsellor Part 2"
1995	Seinfeld	Gardner	Episode: "The Hot Tub"
1995	E.R.	Injured Civil-War Reenactor	Episode: "The Secret Sharer"
1995	JAG	Jesse	Episode: "Brig Break"
1995	The George Wendt Show	Mr. Blake	Episode: "My Brother, the Albatross"
1996	Murder One	Patrick McQueen	4 episodes
1996–1998	Nick Freno: Licensed Teacher	Al Yaroker	Season 1–2
1998	Buffy the Vampire Slayer	Coach Carl Marin	Episode: "Go Fish"
1998	Pensacola: Wings of Gold	General Stabler	Episode: "Raid on Osirak"
1998	Hyperion Bay		Episode: "The Rope"
1999	Any Day Now		2 episodes
2001	Cousin Skeeter		Episode: "Little Mr. Big Man on Campus"
