= Hammerhead: Shark Frenzy =

2005 American film

- DVD cover
- Genre: Action; Horror; Science fiction
- Written by: Kenneth M. Badish; Boaz Davidson
- Directed by: Michael Oblowitz
- Starring: Hunter Tylo; William Forsythe; Jeffrey Combs
- Theme music composer: John Dickson
- Country of origin: United States
- Original language: English

Production
- Producers: Kenneth M. Badish; Boaz Davidson
- Cinematography: Emil Topuzov
- Editor: Alain Jakubowicz
- Running time: 92 minutes

Original release
- Network: Syfy
- Release: June 18, 2005

Hammerhead: Shark Frenzy, also known as Sharkman or simply Hammerhead, is a 2005 Syfy original movie, written by Kenneth M. Badish and Boaz Davidson, and directed by Michael Oblowitz. The film stars William Forsythe, Hunter Tylo, and Jeffrey Combs. The film premiered on Syfy on June 18, 2005.

== Plot ==
Paul King (Anton Argirov) dies of kidney cancer. Five years later, his father Preston King (Jeffrey Combs), a scientist, invites the doctors that could not save his son to his uncharted island in the western Pacific. Paul's widowed wife Amelia Lockhart (Hunter Tylo), who believes Paul died five years ago from cancer, and Amelia's new love interest Tom Reed (William Forsythe), also travel to the island. There, King reveals that Paul never died and was saved from death by being injected with hammerhead shark DNA to modify his stem cells. This turned Paul into a half-man/half-shark creature. King releases the water from the tank where he was keeping Paul, in hopes that he will eat the doctors as revenge for them firing him from his job five years previously. As Paul, now known as Hammerhead, chases after them in the jungle to get away from the water, they escape along with Hammerhead.

Hammerhead starts to attack Bernie near the docks and almost rips his right leg off. He then kills Julie by ripping her apart into pieces when she is separated from Whitney in the jungle. Then the monster kills the wounded Bernie, then the doctor Katie Medevenko who sided with the protagonists to warn them about Dr. King's crazy plans and find cure for cancer but unfortunately falls into water after King's men attack where Hammerhead kills her, and he eats Jane alive while she tries to relieve her burns.

Hammerhead begins killing the workers on the island and tracking down King's "guests" until he is eventually recaptured by King's remaining workers. King's men also capture Amelia, who King hopes his son will remember and mate with to create a half-human/half-shark offspring, as he is convinced that part of Paul is still human. King forces Amelia to watch as one of the doctors, Whitney Feder (Arthur Roberts), is fed to Hammerhead. Amelia is then injected with a drug to calm her as King watches in hopes that Hammerhead will mate with her. However, instead of mating with Amelia, Hammerhead bites off his father's right arm. Tom arrives at the laboratory and rescues Amelia. He forces liquid nitrogen down Hammerhead's throat, causing him to explode. King attempts to shoot Amelia, but Tom shoots him dead. The building explodes as Amelia and Tom, the only two survivors, escape.

== Cast ==
- Hunter Tylo as Amelia Lockhart
- William Forsythe as Tom Reed
- Jeffrey Combs as Dr. Preston King
- Anton Argirov as Paul King / Hammerhead
- Elise Muller as Jane Harper
- Mariya Ignatova as Julie
- Lydie Denier as Dr. Katie Medevenko
- Arthur Roberts as Whitney Feder
- G.R. Johnson as Bernie Amos
- Velizar Binev as Dr. Krause
- Atanas Srebrev as Erik Anderson
- Nikolai Sotirov as Guard #1
- Raicho Vasilev as Guard #2

== Release ==
=== Home media ===
Hammerhead: Shark Frenzy was first released on DVD on October 11, 2005 by First Look Pictures. First Look Pictures later re-released the film on DVD in 2009 as a part of a 2-disk double feature along with Blue Demon.

== Reception ==
Jon Condit from Dread Central awarded the film a negative score of 2/5. In his review, Condit wrote, "Hammerhead: Shark Frenzy has most of the usual problems movies of this type have – clichéd plot, subplots, supporting characters, and minor details that are introduced but never really followed through on, dull protagonists, illogical science, a monster that somehow manages to always be at just the right place at the right time, inconsistent special effects, etc. All of this would be easier to overlook if the movie gave us the killer landshark action we’re watching the movie for. We do get it but only in quick bursts that fail to fully satisfy." Popcorn Pictures.com awarded the film a score of 4/10, writing, "Hammerhead: Shark Frenzy is a mixed bag. You have a preposterously-plotted but perfectly watchable B-movie which, sadly, is let down by a number of clichés and a sense of being too self-conscious to embrace its ridiculousness and go all-out. Not enough of the titular character hurts matters greatly too." Horror.net awarded the film a mixed 5 out of 10 stars, calling it "A good, goofy B-monster movie." Christopher Armstead from Film Critics United gave the film a negative review, criticizing the film's acting, and the title monster's lack of screen time.

== See also ==
- List of killer shark films
- Skeleton Man, a 2004 Sci Fi original film
- Mosquito Man, a 2005 Sci Fi original film
- Snakeman (film), a 2005 Sci Fi original film
