= Caren Kaye =

American actress

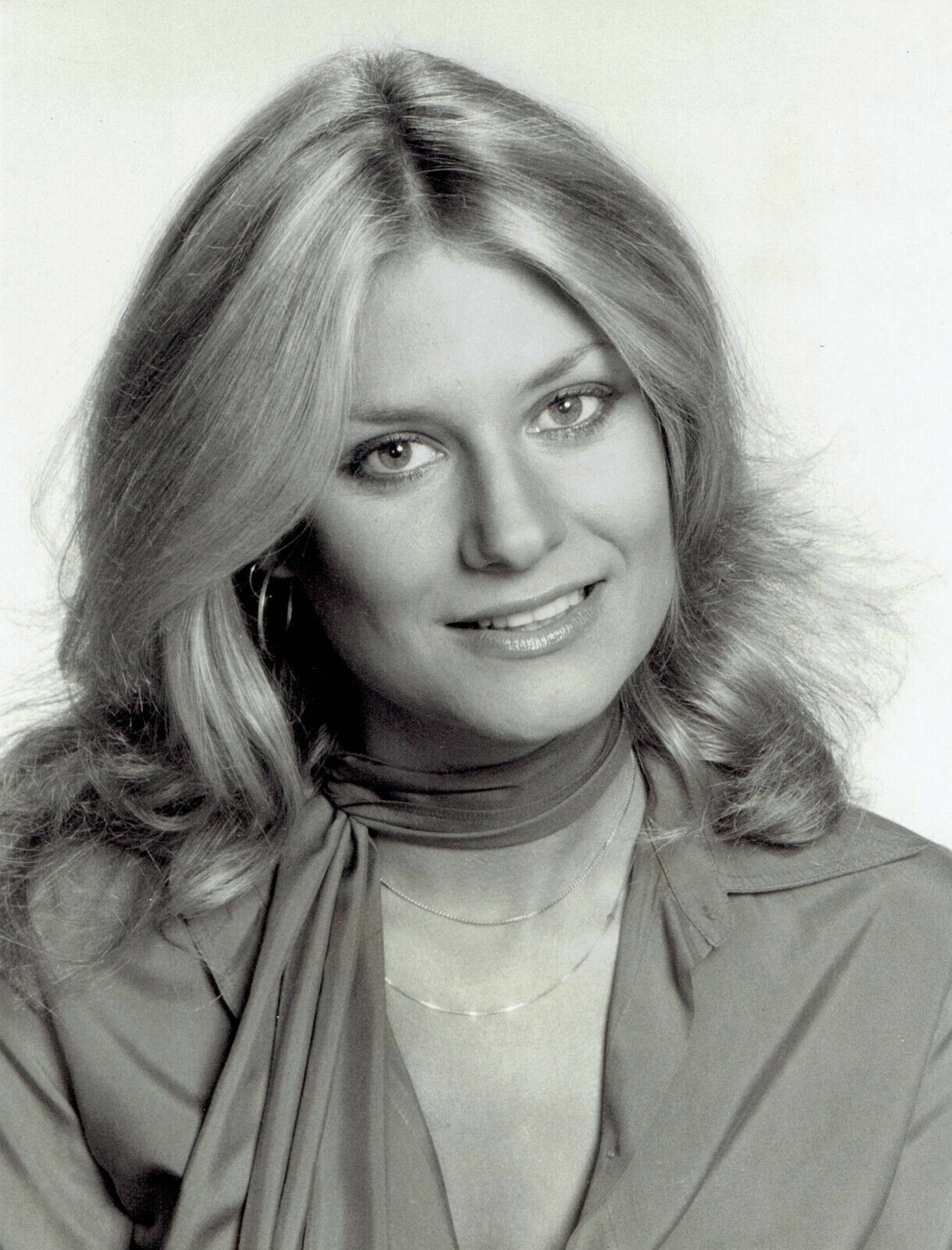
- Kaye in 1977
- Born: United States
- Occupation: Actress
- Years active: 1972–1994
- Spouse: Renny Temple (m. 1980)

Caren Kaye is a retired American television and film actress who has appeared in films and guest-starred in many TV series. She is best known for her roles in the 1983 film My Tutor and the short-lived sitcoms The Betty White Show (1977–1978), Who's Watching the Kids? (1978), and It's Your Move (1984–1985).

== Early years and education ==
Kaye was educated at the High School of Performing Arts and Carnegie Mellon University. In the early 1970s, she studied and practiced the improvisational games created by Viola Spolin.

== Career ==
From college, Kaye went to Europe, where she performed in avant-garde theater and drove a taxi. After she returned to New York, she co-founded the War Babies comedy troupe.

One of Kaye's early roles was in a training film for the United States Navy about a young woman going through basic training. During the mid-1970s, she guest-starred in episodes of Alice, The Mary Tyler Moore Show, Rhoda, and The Practice. She played Bambi Benton on Blansky's Beauties, a spin-off of Happy Days, which aired from February to June 1977. In September 1977, she co-starred in a similar role as a regular on The Betty White Show, which lasted one season.

Her film credits include Looking for Mr. Goodbar (1977), Cuba Crossing (1980), Some Kind of Hero (1982), My Tutor (1983), Teen Witch (1989) and Satan's Princess (1990).

In 1984, Kaye co-starred as the mother of Jason Bateman and girlfriend of David Garrison in the teen comedy It's Your Move. This series lasted one season.

She was featured in six episodes of The Love Boat and has guest-starred in 21 Jump Street, Mr. Belvedere, Fantasy Island, Simon & Simon, Matt Houston, Taxi and Murder, She Wrote.

== Personal life ==
Kaye married actor Renny Temple, who performed with her in the War Babies troupe, and they have one child.

== Filmography ==
=== Film ===
Year	Title	Role	Notes
1973	Checkmate	Alex	
1974	The Lords of Flatbush	Student	
1977	Looking for Mr. Goodbar	Rhoda	
1980	Cuba Crossing	Tracy	
1982	Some Kind of Hero	Sheila Daniels	
1983	My Tutor	Terry Green	
1989	Teen Witch	Margaret Miller	
1989	Satan's Princess	Leah	
1994	Pumpkinhead II: Blood Wings	Beth Braddock	

=== Television ===
Year	Title	Role	Notes
1976	Alice	Debbie	Episode: "Pay the Fifty Dollars"
1976	The Mary Tyler Moore Show	Barbara Jean Smathers	Episode: "What's Wrong with Swimming?"
1976	Monster Squad	Mimi Falters	Episode: "The Astrologer"
1976	The Practice	Rhonda Curtis	Episode: "It's All in the Head"
1976	Van Dyke and Company	Computer Female Date #1	Episode #1.6
1976	Rhoda	Cissy	Episode: "A Touch of Classy"
1977	Blansky's Beauties	Bambi Benton	13 episodes
1977	The Natural Look	Jane	Television film
1977–1978	The Betty White Show	Tracy Garrett	13 episodes
1978	Fantasy Island	Dina McKay / Nina McKay	Episode: "Fool for a Client/Double Your Pleasure"
1978	Starsky & Hutch	Melinda Rogers	Episode: "The Groupie"
1978–1979	Who's Watching the Kids?	Stacy Turner	11 episodes
1978–1986	The Love Boat	Various roles	6 episodes
1979	The Misadventures of Sheriff Lobo	Carnie	Episode: "The Day That Shark Ate Lobo"
1980	The Life and Times of Eddie Roberts	Marcia	5 episodes
1982	Help Wanted: Male	Aggie Swoboda	Television film
1982	Taxi	The Beautiful Actress	Episode: "Alex the Gofer"
1983	Remington Steele	Megan O'Toole	Episode: "Hearts of Steele"
1983	Hardcastle and McCormick	Donna May McCabe	Episode: "Goin' Nowhere Fast"
1984	Empire	Meredith	6 episodes
1984	Matt Houston	Karen Andrews	Episode: "The Bikini Murders"
1984–1985	It's Your Move	Eileen Burton	18 episodes
1985	Finder of Lost Loves	Kathy Cullen	Episode: "From the Heart"
1985	Poison Ivy	Margo Klopper	Television film
1985	Comedy Factory	Deborah Kazinsky	Episode: "Side by Side"
1985, 1986	Simon & Simon	Elizabeth Charles	2 episodes
1985, 1987	Hotel	Various roles	2 episodes
1986	Amazing Stories	Dorothy	Episode: "Magic Saturday"
1987	Murder, She Wrote	Lois Ames	Episode: "Death Takes a Dive"
1987	Mr. Belvedere	Waitress	Episode: "Baby"
1987	21 Jump Street	Mrs. Sheffield	Episode: "In the Custody of a Clown"
1988	Out of This World	Diane	Episode: "Pen Pals"
