= Lydie Denier =

French model and actress

- Born: Pontchâteau, France
- Occupations: Actress, model
- Years active: Model: 1978– Actress: 1985–
- Website: https://lydiemdenier.com/

Lydie Denier is a French-American model and actress. She has appeared in numerous TV series and films.

== Career ==
When she was 14 she became a model, appearing in magazines including Vogue and ELLE. She began traveling the world when she was 16 years old, spending time in Africa, the Caribbean, and Germany, where she got her first record deal with Polygram, singing ballads.

After winning a minor beauty contest in Italy and attending the Miss Italia 1984, she decided to become an actress.

She visited Los Angeles on vacation and decided to stay and pursue an acting career. She began appearing in videos and commercials while she refined her English skills and studied acting. In 1988 she had her first feature film appearance in the U.S. in Bulletproof, with Gary Busey. She appeared in several TV series, most notably General Hospital, The Flash and Starman, among others. In 1991 she guest starred in Baywatch.

In 1991, she was cast as Jane Porter for the Tarzán series. She came to the attention of Zalman King, who cast her for a role in Wild Orchid II: Two Shades of Blue as well as an appearance in the Red Shoe Diaries series. In 1996, after appearances in Silk Stalkings, Tarzan: The Epic Adventures, Conan the Adventurer, and The New Adventures of Robin Hood, she was cast as a spy in the series Acapulco H.E.A.T.

In 2000, she released her own calendar. She continues to appear in films and television shows such as Spin City, Gilmore Girls, and Hammerhead.

== Personal life ==
She lives in Laguna Beach, California, where she is a naturalized U.S. citizen.

She is the host of the cooking show Breaking Bread with Lydie Denier.

== Partial filmography ==
- Starman: "The Return" (1986) as Darcy
- Paramedics (1988) as Liette
- Blood Relations (1988) as Marie
- Bulletproof (1988) as Tracy
- General Hospital (1989) as Dr. Yasmine Bernoudi
- China Beach (two episodes, 1989–1990) as Danielle
- Satan's Princess (1990) as Nicole St. James
- Red Blooded American Girl (1990) as Rebecca Murrin
- The Flash: "Honor Among Thieves" (1990) as Kate Tatting
- Wild Orchid II: Two Shades of Blue (1991) as Dominique
- Baywatch (1991) as French Stewardess
- Tarzán (1991–1994) as Jane Porter (Tarzan)
- Red Shoe Diaries: "Talk to Me Baby" (1992) as Elaine
- Invasion of Privacy (1992) as Vicky
- Perfect Alibi as Jeannine
- Melrose Place Season 4 one episode 1996 Dead Sisters Walking
- Tarzan: The Epic Adventures (1996–1997) as Olga de Coude
- Silk Stalkings: "Night of the Parrot" (1997) as Danielle
- Conan the Adventurer (1997) as Katrina
- The New Adventures of Robin Hood: episodes: "Orphans" (1998) as Emily, the maid
  and "The Assassin" (1998) as Countess Emily Du Monde
- Acapulco H.E.A.T. (1998–1999) as Nicole
- Spin City: "A Tale of Four Cities" (2002) as Simone
- Gilmore Girls: "Korean Thanksgiving" (2002) as Monique Clemenceau
- Hammerhead: Shark Frenzy (2005) as Doctor Mendoveko
