= Rhonda Bates =

American actress

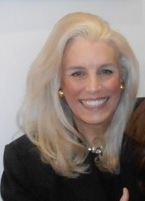
- Rhonda Bates 2014
- Occupation: Actress
- Years active: 1975–1990
- Height: 6 ft 2 in (1.88 m)

Rhonda Bates is a former American actress. In 1978, she starred in the NBC miniseries Rollergirls. She played the recurring character Evelyn Thadburn on the first season of the NBC sitcom CPO Sharkey. Standing 6 ft 2 in tall, she is well known for her height.

== Early life and education ==
Bates grew up in Evansville, Indiana, graduating from Reitz High School in 1966. She studied health and physical education at the University of Evansville, and earned a master's degree in theater at the University of Arkansas. She then taught health and physical education at Cynthia Heights Elementary School in Evansville before heading to California.

== Career ==
Bates first received attention doing a standup comedy act at The Comedy Store. She was noticed by a producer who hired her for a Don Rickles TV special.

In 1975, Bates was hired as a featured player on the short-lived variety sketch show Keep on Truckin', featuring Didi Conn, Fred Travalena and Wayland Flowers.

Bates had a recurring role in the 1976–77 season of the Don Rickles sitcom CPO Sharkey, as the love-interest of 6'7" tall Seaman Pruitt, played by actor Peter Isacksen. She appeared in just one episode of Sharkey's second season, as her focus turned to a recurring role on Blansky's Beauties, where she played Arkansas, a gawky Vegas showgirl; the series was cancelled after 13 episodes. She also appeared on the 1977 sitcom Rollergirls, as roller derby queen Mongo Sue Lampert; the series was cancelled after four episodes. Bates also guest starred in a Love Boat episode where she played an ugly stepsister in a Cinderella storyline.

In 1979, Bates played Enid in Gabe Kaplan's college basketball comedy film Fast Break.

In 1980, Bates was in the film Roadie, co-starring rocker Meat Loaf and comedy legend Art Carney.

She later had a co-hosting role on Speak Up, America (a Real People – inspired TV magazine / reality show). One of her co-hosts was former-child-evangelist-turned-actor Marjoe Gortner.

Bates continued to work in a few TV guest shots up until 1988, then apparently quit acting around age 40.
