= Street Music (1981 film) =

1981 film directed by Jenny Bowen

- Directed by: Jenny Bowen
- Screenplay by: Jenny Bowen
- Produced by: Richard Bowen
- Starring: Elizabeth Daily; Larry Breeding; Ned Glass
- Cinematography: Richard Bowen
- Edited by: Jenny Bowen; Lisa Fruchtman; Diana Pelligrini
- Production company: Pacificon Films
- Distributed by: Speciality Films
- Release date: October 1981 (USA)

Street Music is a 1981 film written and directed by San Francisco–based filmmaker Jenny Bowen. It represents one of Elizabeth Daily's earliest starring roles.

== Plot ==
The film centers around a group of elderly residents of an old San Francisco hotel and are threatened with eviction when a developer wants to demolish the structure. Initially, they feel resigned to their fate, but a young desk clerk (Elizabeth Daily) gets involved and helps spearhead a resistance.

== Cast ==
- Elizabeth Daily as Sadie Deleward
- Larry Breeding as Eddie
- Ned Glass as Sam
- Marjorie Eaton as Mildred

== Production ==
Bowen, who was 37 at the time she filmed Street Music, conceived the idea during a lull on the production of Apocalypse Now, where she was working as a recording engineer. She was walking from Francis Ford Coppola's offices and stumbled upon a group of elderly people who were being evicted from their longtime home.

Bowen also recounted working as a bookkeeper at a run-down San Francisco hotel while beginning her acting career and seeing people being evicted. She based the film's central character on a roommate she had who was a street singer and a dancer. The film was influenced by the story of the residents of the International Hotel, a single-room-occupancy residential hotel in the Tenderloin, who protested their eviction.

Neither she nor her husband—cinematographer Richard Bowen—had any experience writing or directing at the time. The pair raised an initial $450,000 and later realized they'd need another $150,000, which brought the total to $600,000. The money came in chunks, as some of the bigger names had suggested things like turning the script into an "old peoples' 'Animal House.'"

The film was shot on location in San Francisco's Tenderloin neighborhood over the course of 37 days, beginning in October 1980. They shot inside the then-abandoned Hotel Hamlin on Eddy Street that they refurbished, as well as on the surrounding streets. During the duration of the filming, the Bowens had to deal with an actors' strike, ruptured water pipes, a car crash, and an actor having a heart attack.

Sadly, co-star Larry Breeding died in a car crash three months before the film's premiere.

== Reception ==
The film played at a number of film festivals, and tied for first place in the independent feature section at the U.S. Film Festival. Reviews were mostly positive; The San Francisco Examiner's Nancy Scott called it "an intelligent balance between the bitter and the sweet," and says that it was filmed "with a clear, loving and unpretentious eye." Robert Redford liked the film so much he connected the Bowens with funding through the Sundance Institute for their second film.
