= Blood Relations (film) =

- Video release poster
- Directed by: Graeme Campbell
- Written by: Steven Saylor
- Starring: Jan Rubeš; Kevin Hicks; Lydie Denier
- Cinematography: Rhett Morita
- Edited by: Michael McMahon
- Music by: Mychael Danna
- Production company: SC Entertainment
- Distributed by: Creswin Distribution
- Release date: December 9, 1988
- Running time: 90 minutes
- Country: Canada
- Language: English

Blood Relations is a 1988 Canadian horror film directed by Graeme Campbell and starring Jan Rubeš, Kevin Hicks, and Lydie Denier. Its plot follows the members of a dysfunctional family who congregate at an isolated mansion, where they expose each other's darkest secrets with lethal results.

== Plot ==
Thomas is accompanied by his girlfriend, Marie, to Thomas's lavish familial estate in the middle of the winter. They arrive at the empty house, while Thomas's estranged father Andreas, a neurosurgeon, is performing an operation at the local hospital. Thomas tells Marie how his mother, Sheila, died in the home, and remarks that he misses her. When Andreas returns home from his shift, he finds Thomas in a bathtub, appearing to have committed suicide, but quickly realizes it is simply a prank, and that Thomas has painted a fake wound on his neck. Andreas, who suffers from heart troubles, is startled by the incident.

Later, Thomas and Marie join Andreas for dinner, which is also attended by Thomas's successful brother Jack, an attorney, and his girlfriend, Sharon. Later, Thomas confesses to Marie that he wishes his father was dead, and laments that the prank they played earlier did not trigger a fatal heart attack. That night, Marie and Thomas witness Andreas having sex with Sharon. The next morning, Thomas visits his ailing maternal grandfather, Charles, in the hospital. Meanwhile, Marie informs Jack that Sharon had sex with his father. That afternoon, Marie passes out after finding the family's mutilated cat in a closet.

Marie joins Andreas for a drink, and tells him she suspects either Jack or Yuri, the family's handyman, of murdering the cat. Andreas denies her claim, specifically regarding Jack, whom he says will inherit the whole of his grandfather Charles's $250 million estate. Andreas tells Marie that Thomas had an unusual bond with his mother, and that he never recovered from her death. Marie suddenly grows tired, ostensibly from a spiked drink, and has a nightmare in which she is raped by Andreas.

Charles is discharged from the hospital and placed in hospice care at the familial estate. The same day, Thomas leaves the family estate, telling Marie he has a business meeting but will return later. Marie visits with the ailing Charles in his room, and he tells her how much she resembles his deceased daughter. Charles offers to pay Marie for sexual favors as part of his dying wish, which she obliges. When Marie later tries to phone Thomas at his office, she is told by a secretary that there is no scheduled meeting there. That night, Andreas offers Marie several drinks, and the two visit with Charles. Marie realizes her drink has been drugged, and she again begins losing consciousness.

Marie has a nightmare in which she finds Andreas performing a craniotomy on a terrified Sharon in the basement of the home. After awaking, Marie is confronted by Jack, who tells her it was his idea that she and Thomas kill Andreas; Jack proposes, however, that they instead join forces and kill Thomas, which will result in Marie inheriting Charles's estate. The two are confronted by Andreas, who incapacitates Marie before restraining Jack to his operating chair in the basement, and performs a lobotomy on him. When Marie awakens, she finds Andreas calmly frying pieces of Jack's brain tissue in the kitchen. Upstairs, she finds Charles's corpse in his bed with his scalp removed. Marie is terrorized by Andreas as she flees through the mansion. In the basement operating room, she finds Jack in the operating chair, and discovers Sheila lying in a hyperbaric chamber. Marie is startled to see Sheila open her eyes.

A terrified Marie flees and seeks help from Yuri in the guest house. Yuri pretends to phone police, but in facts summons Andreas. Marie momentarily manages to escape their grasp, and finds Sharon's dead body in the greenhouse. She is recaptured and brought to the basement, where Andreas prepares to perform surgery on her. Thomas arrives, and it becomes clear he is in cahoots with his father: The two have orchestrated to transplant the ailing Sheila's brain into Marie's healthy body, allowing Sheila to continue living. As Andreas performs a craniotomy on Marie, a tear streams down her face before he removes her brain.

== Cast ==
- Jan Rubeš as Andreas
- Kevin Hicks as Thomas
- Lydie Denier as Marie
- Lynne Adams as Sharon
- Steven Saylor as Jack
- Sam Malkin as Yuri
- Ray Walston as Charles
- Marilyn Haskell as Sheila

== Production ==
Jan Rubeš was cast in the role of Andreas, the mad surgeon patriarch of the family, based on his performance in 1987's Dead of Winter. Robert Stack had also been considered for the role of Andreas. Filming took place in Toronto, Ontario, Canada over a 30-day period in the winter of 1988.

== Release ==
The film screened twice at the 1989 Montreal World Film Festival. It subsequently opened theatrically in Canada on December 9, 1988.

=== Critical response ===
TV Guide awarded the film two out of five stars, noting: "A baroque exercise in Grand Guignol horror, Blood Relations dresses up its thin, predictable plot with layers of menacing atmosphere."

== Sources ==
- Schabas, Ezra (2007). Jan Rubes: A Man of Many Talents. Toronto, Ontario: Dundurn Press. ISBN 978-1-459-71482-3.
- Young, R. G. (2000). The Encyclopedia of Fantastic Film: Ali Baba to Zombies. New York: Hal Leonard Corporation. ISBN 1-55783-269-2.
