= Animal Behavior (film) =

- Directed by: Jenny Bowen; Kjehl Rasmussen
- Written by: Susan Rice
- Starring: Karen Allen; Armand Assante; Josh Mostel; Holly Hunter; Richard Libertini
- Music by: Cliff Eidelman
- Release date: October 27, 1989
- Running time: 88 minutes
- Country: United States
- Language: English
- Budget: $3.5 million
- Box office: $41,526

Animal Behavior is a 1989 comedy film directed by Jenny Bowen and Kjehl Rasmussen and starring Karen Allen, Armand Assante, and Holly Hunter.

== Plot ==
The beautiful biologist Alex Brisco develops a new method to communicate with chimpanzees: instead of machines she uses a simple sign language. Her research and competition with ignorant colleagues lets her overlook the amorous approaches of cellist Mark. She accepts his help, but no more, because she believes he is married.

== Cast ==
- Karen Allen as Alex Bristow
- Armand Assante as Mark Mathias
- Josh Mostel as Mel Gorsky
- Holly Hunter as Coral Grable
- Richard Libertini as Dr. Parrish
- Jon Shear as Tyler Forbes
- Nan Martin as Mrs. Norton
- Crystal Buda as Cleo Grable

== Production ==
Animal Behavior was the final film for Alexa Kenin who played Sheila Sandusky, released posthumously; her scenes were filmed in 1984 when the project was started by Jenny Bowen. Filming was intermittent for the next four years until it was completed by producer Kjehl Rasmussen. As a result, the director's name was credited with the pseudonym H. Anne Riley.
