= Jenny Bowen (filmmaker) =

American screenwriter and film director

- Born: San Francisco, California, U.S.
- Education: San Francisco State University
- Occupations: Screenwriter, director
- Spouse: Richard Bowen

Jenny Bowen is an American screenwriter and director known for her work on films like Street Music and In Quiet Night. She is married to the cinematographer Richard Bowen.

Bowen intended to be an actress, performing in plays while attending San Francisco State University. She later began directing stage plays before becoming interested in sound design.

Bowen formulated the idea for her debut feature, Street Music, during a production lull in Francis Ford Coppola's Apocalypse Now, where she was working as a recording engineer. After the success of Street Music, she went on to direct three more films.

In 1998, she retired from filmmaking and founded OneSky for all children, a global NGO that works with orphaned and abandoned children worldwide. She has published a book, Wish You Happy Forever, based on her work with OneSky.

In 2008, she was chosen by popular vote to carry the Olympic Torch on Chinese soil ahead of the 2008 Summer Olympics in Beijing.

== Selected filmography ==
- Street Music (1981)
- The Wizard of Loneliness (1988)
- In Quiet Night (1998)
- Animal Behavior (1989)
