= The Betty White Show (1977 TV series) =

American television series

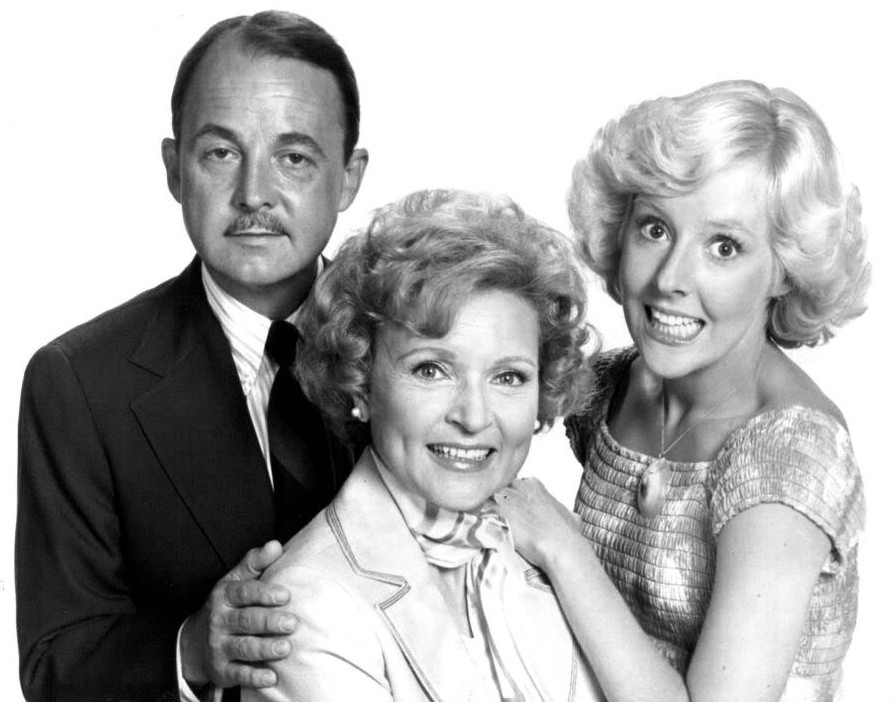
- Betty White (center) with John Hillerman and Georgia Engel, 1977
- Created by: Ed. Weinberger; Stan Daniels
- Developed by: David Lloyd
- Directed by: James Burrows; Harvey Medlinsky; Noam Pitlik; Doug Rogers
- Starring: Betty White; John Hillerman; Georgia Engel
- Composer: Dick DeBenedictis
- Country of origin: United States
- Original language: English
- No. of seasons: 1
- No. of episodes: 14

Production
- Executive producers: Stan Daniels; Ed. Weinberger
- Producers: Bob Ellison; Dale McRaven
- Camera setup: Multi-camera
- Running time: 22–24 minutes
- Production company: MTM Enterprises

Original release
- Network: CBS
- Release: September 12, 1977 – January 9, 1978

The Betty White Show is an American television series which aired on CBS from September 12, 1977, to January 9, 1978. Fourteen episodes were broadcast. The series was produced by MTM Enterprises. This program should not be confused with two earlier television programs that had the same title—a daytime talk show that ran on NBC from February 8, 1954, to December 31, 1954, and a prime-time comedy variety show that ran on ABC from February 5, 1958, to April 30, 1958.

== Synopsis ==
Joyce Whitman (Betty White), a middle-aged actress, lands the lead in a police series titled Undercover Woman, a parody of Police Woman. Joyce is thrilled with the show, but less pleased to learn that the director is John Elliot (John Hillerman), her ex-husband, whom she unfondly refers to as "old pickle puss." He responds in kind, supplying his star with an oversized male double named Hugo (Charles Cyphers), a sexy, much younger onscreen sidekick (Caren Kaye), and dialogue not nearly as sharp as her tongue. Also on hand are Mitzi Maloney (Georgia Engel), Joyce's best friend; co-star actor Fletcher Huff (Barney Phillips); and network penny-pincher Doug Porterfield (Alex Henteloff).

== Reception ==
The series was scheduled opposite Monday Night Football and The NBC Monday Movie and failed to generate viewers. The show was canceled after 14 episodes. Nick at Nite and TV Land briefly broadcast reruns of the show during the 1990s.

The series aired on Channel 4 in the United Kingdom in 1985.

== Cast ==
- Betty White as Joyce Whitman, a sharp-tongued actress
- John Hillerman as John Elliot, Joyce's ex-husband and director of her show
- Georgia Engel as Mitzi Maloney, Joyce's naive best friend/roommate

=== Recurring ===
- Caren Kaye as Tracy Garrett, Joyce's younger, sexier co-star
- Charles Cyphers as Hugo Muncy, Joyce's hunky stunt double
- Barney Phillips as Fletcher Huff, Joyce's co-star
- Alex Henteloff as Doug Porterfield, a network executive who oversees Undercover Woman

== Episodes ==
No.	Title	Directed by	Written by	Original release date
1	"Undercover Police Woman"	Bill Persky	David Lloyd	September 12, 1977
2	"Mitzi's Cousin"	Doug Rogers	Bob Ellison	September 19, 1977
Mitzi convinces Joyce to let Wilma (Janis Paige), her recently divorced cousin, stay with them while she visits Los Angeles, but Wilma ends up falling for John and soon wants to move to Los Angeles.
3	"Make Yourself at Home...Steal Something"	James Burrows	Earl Pomerantz	September 26, 1977
While Mitzi throws a surprise party for Joyce, her diamond necklace goes missing.
4	"Doug Gets Fired"	Noam Pitlik	David Lloyd	October 3, 1977
5	"We're Not Divorced: Part 1"	Harvey Medlinsky	David Lloyd	October 10, 1977
Joyce and John are shocked to find during a tax audit that their divorce was never finalized. Meanwhile, Joyce is upset when Tracy writes a script for the show that makes her look bad.
6	"We're Not Divorced: Part 2"	Harvey Medlinsky	David Lloyd	October 17, 1977
7	"Mitzi's Jealousy"	Doug Rogers	David Lloyd	October 24, 1977
8	"Good Night, Sweet Fletch"	Burt Brinckerhoff	Glen Charles & Les Charles	October 31, 1977
9	"John's Mother"	James Burrows	Dale McRaven	November 7, 1977
John's mother (Elizabeth Kerr) comes to visit her son. Because she does not know about John and Joyce's divorce, they have to pretend to be a happy couple for her.
10	"Joyce, The Matchmaker"	Jay Sandrich	David Lloyd	November 14, 1977
11	"Joyce's Wedding"	Burt Brinckerhoff	Bill Idelson	December 12, 1977
When Joyce begins dating a race car driver (Philip Carey), John suspects he is using her to break into show business.
12	"Fletcher's Decision"	Noam Pitlik	Sheldon Bull	December 19, 1977
Joyce and Mitzi have Fletcher and his wife Marian (Florence Halop) as houseguests while their home is being repainted. However, the couple soon overstays their welcome.
13	"Play Misty for John"	James Burrows	Earl Pomerantz	January 2, 1978
14	"The Stunt Woman"	Noam Pitlik	David Lloyd	January 9, 1978
A rumor begins that Undercover Woman may be cancelled, but Joyce initially dismisses it. When Doug discovers the rumor is correct, Joyce throws a party to convince the network heads to save the show. Meanwhile, Hugo is upset that John has hired a stunt woman for Tracy and believes her hiring caused bad luck that got the show cancelled.
