= List of Gilligan's Island characters =

The following lists the main and recurring characters of the American situation comedy Gilligan's Island, created and produced by Sherwood Schwartz, and the reunion television movies.

== Main characters ==
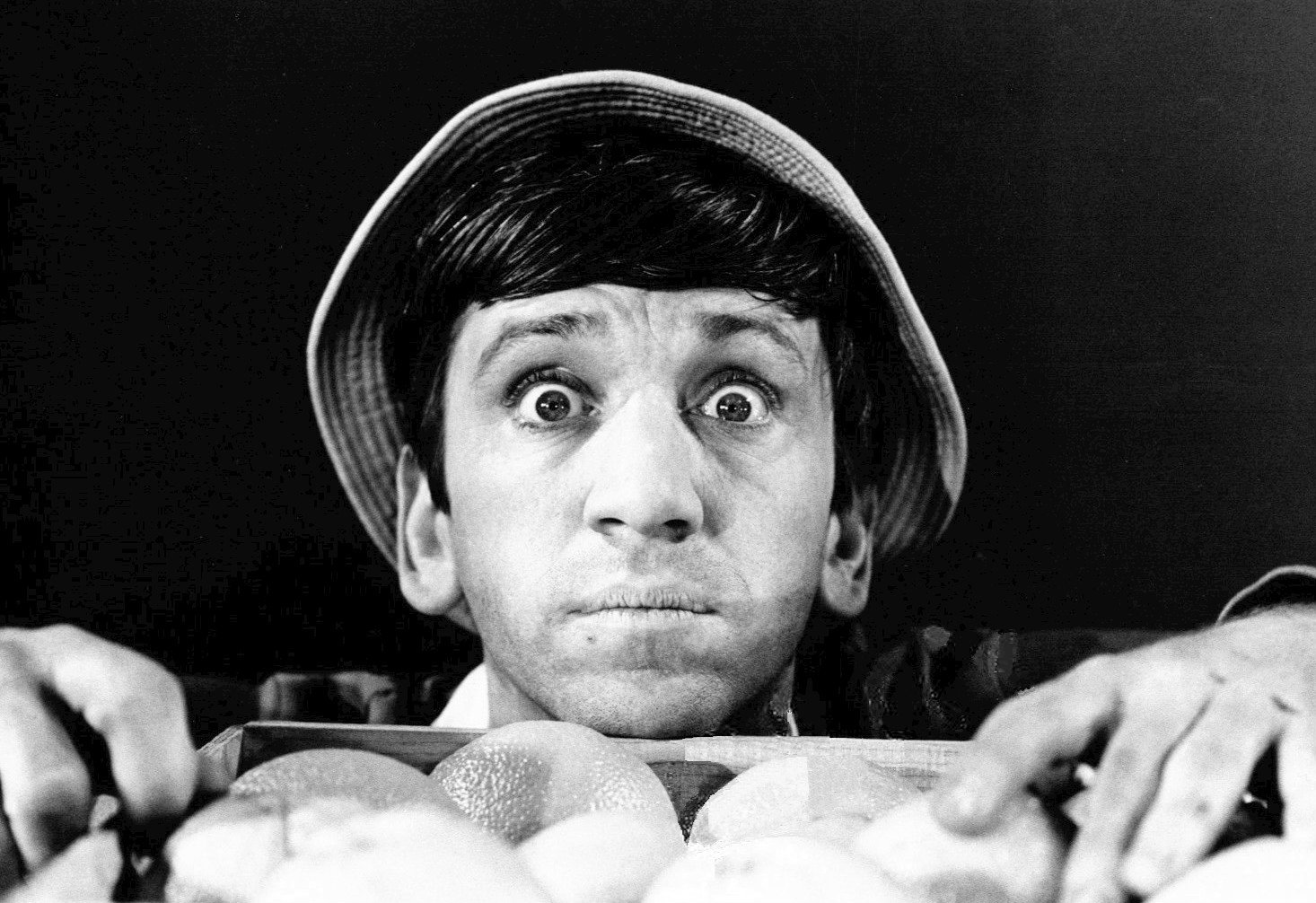
Bob Denver as Willy Gilligan

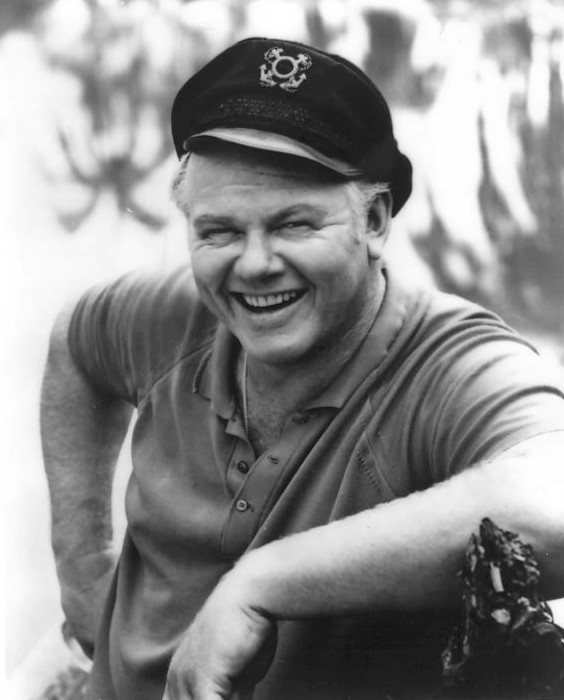
Alan Hale Jr. as Cpt. Jonas Grumby ("The Skipper")

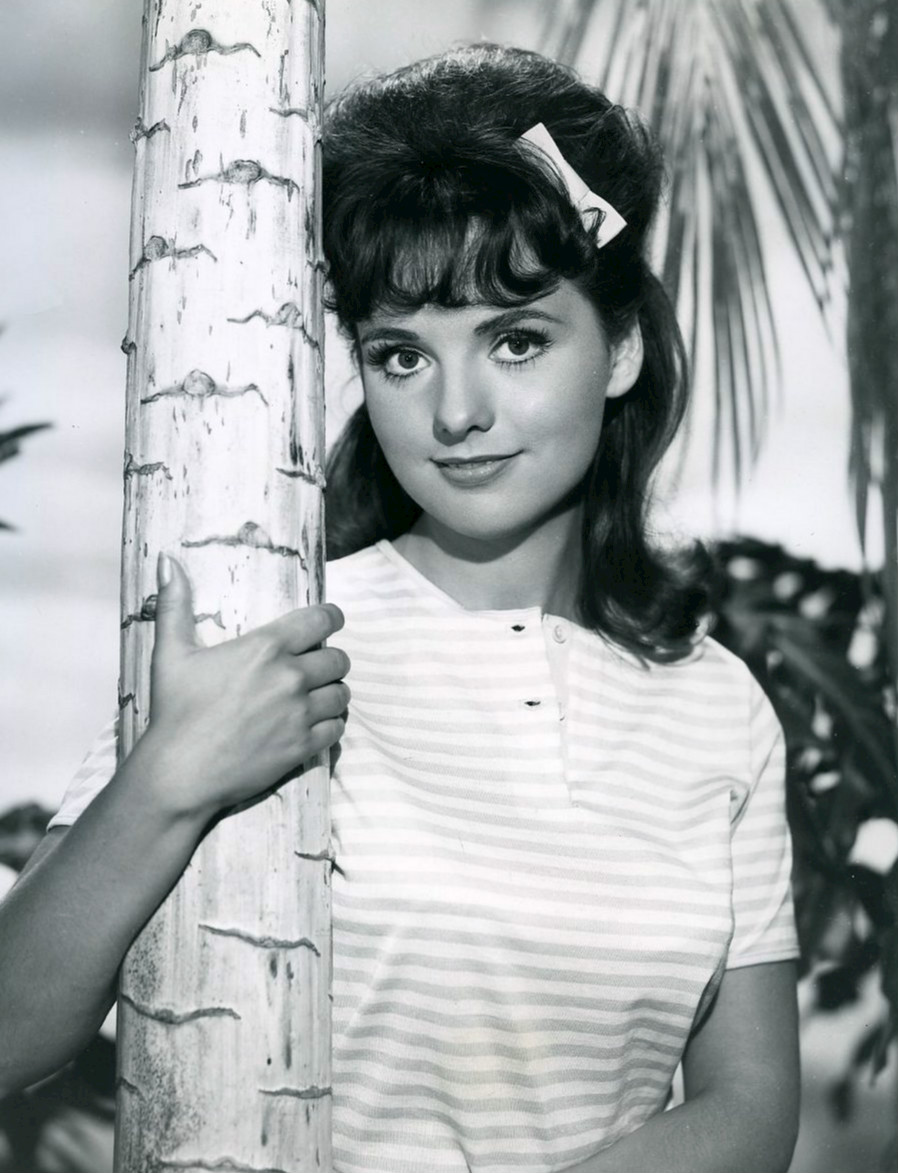
Dawn Wells as Mary Ann Summers

- Gilligan (portrayed by Bob Denver) – As the sitcom's title character, Gilligan is the first mate (and sole crewman) of the S. S. Minnow under the Skipper. He's well-meaning and incompetent in roughly equal measure. Gilligan frequently and inadvertently messes up the castaways' efforts to get themselves rescued; moreover, he is typically blamed for said failures whether he's at fault or not. He wears a red shirt, light blue pants, and a white sailor's hat. His first name is never mentioned in the original run of the show, or any other movies/cartoons. When promoting the first reunion movie on Dick Cavett's show, it was asked if Gilligan was his first or last name. Sherwood Schwartz replied that it was never stipulated, but obviously sounded like a last name. Bob Denver said he always felt like Gilligan's first name should be Willie and Sherwood Schwartz agreed.
- Cpt. Jonas Grumby (portrayed by Alan Hale Jr.) – Referred to in the series as "The Skipper" (but often as "Captain" by Mr. Howell), who is the captain of the S. S. Minnow. His portliness leads to numerous fat jokes, mostly from Gilligan. Such an instance is when the Professor and Gilligan are helping him into a wetsuit: "The Skipper" says that he just has big bones, to which Gilligan adds: "and they're covered in big meat". The Skipper is just slightly more able-minded than Gilligan, with whom he has a love-hate relationship: he'll often address his first mate as "Little Buddy", then get frustrated and swat Gilligan in the head with his hat. Basically, he plays Oliver Hardy to Gilligan's Stan Laurel.
- Thurston Howell III (portrayed by Jim Backus) – Thurston is a millionaire used to luxurious living and never does any work on the island. The only exception is when the castaways believe that Mr. Howell is broke and make him work. He devises many get-rich-quick schemes on the island. Thurston was originally a multi-billionaire until the stock market crash rendered him a multi-millionaire.
- Eunice "Lovey" Howell (portrayed by Natalie Schafer) – Thurston's wife. She can be more spoiled than Mr. Howell at times, but is always the first to want to try something new. Mr. Howell always calls her "Lovey". Her maiden name is Wentworth.
- Ginger Grant (portrayed by Tina Louise) – A Hollywood movie star. Ginger usually tries to use tricks from the movies she starred in to solve problems, causing other castaways to rescue her from any dangers that befall her. She helps Mary Ann with cooking and dishwashing.
- Roy Hinkley, Ph.D. (portrayed by Russell Johnson) – Referred to on the series as "The Professor", he was actually a high school teacher and scout master before being stranded on the island. He has numerous scientific degrees and uses his knowledge to build many things on the island out of the available materials.
- Mary Ann Summers (portrayed by Dawn Wells) – A farm girl from Winfield, Kansas. Not much is known about her before she gets to the island. She is portrayed as a typical "girl next door" and does most of the laundry and cooking with some help from Ginger.

== Recurring characters ==
- Radio Announcer (voiced by Charles Maxwell) – An announcer on the radio that the castaways own. The castaways would listen to his plot-advancing radio bulletins in many episodes and always with perfect timing to hear the exact news they needed to know.
- The Natives (Various actors) - The castaways frequently encountered members of various tribes living on neighboring islands upon their arrival to the island.
- Wrongway Feldman (portrayed by Hans Conried) – A fighter pilot from World War I. He was stuck on the island when he tried to fly around the world in The Spirit of the Bronx. He leaves at the end of the episode, but returns in a future episode saying he will stay on the island. However, he leaves again and crashes. The castaways get a message from him saying he "crashed on a strange island", which appears to be Hawaiʻi.
- Japanese Sailor (portrayed by Vito Scotti) – Appeared in two episodes. For his first appearance, he locks up everybody on the island except Gilligan and Skipper. In his second appearance, he appears in a flashback of events that never happened.
- The Gorilla (performed by Janos Prohaska) – The only animal antagonist on the island, causes mayhem and mischief. In the episode '"Diamonds Are an Ape's Best Friend", he kidnaps Mrs. Howell because her perfume acted as a pheromone. In the episode "Chain of Command", he disciplines Gilligan to be a better leader. In the episode "Forward March", he shells the castaways with hand grenades after finding WWII weapons in a cave. In the episode "Our Vines Have Tender Apes", the gorilla is replaced with a large orangutan. Janos Prohaska also performed Gladys the chimpanzee in the episode "Beauty Is as Beauty Does".
- Dr. Boris Balinkoff (portrayed by Vito Scotti) – A mad scientist who appears twice. For his first appearance, he takes the castaways to his castle on another island where he did mind-swapping experiments on them. In the end, the castaways escape. The second time, he uses mind-control rings to get the castaways to rob Fort Knox. He then flees when they attack him with coconuts and is never seen by them again.
  - Igor #1 (portrayed by Mike Mazurki) - Dr. Balinkoff's assistant.
  - Timothy - Dr. Balinkoff's pet parrot. The experiments of Dr. Balinkoff replaced Timothy's personality with that of a lion.
  - Igor #2 - Dr. Balinkoff's pet capuchin monkey.

== Guests on Gilligan's Island ==
In some episodes, there are different characters who appear on Gilligan's Island that are either visitors or have been on the unexplored parts of the island. They are listed in order of appearance:

- Jackson Farrell (portrayed by Larry Storch) – A bank robber on the lam plans to use the island as a hideout.
- Jungle Boy (portrayed by Kurt Russell) – A feral child who is found on the island in the first season episode "Gilligan Meets Jungle Boy" where all he can do is make bird noises and copy certain words. How he got on the island and how he was raised was not revealed in the episode. The castaways try to teach him human manners. Yet when he sees himself in a mirror by Ginger, he screams and runs out of the hut. The jungle boy shows Gilligan a natural helium outlet in the jungle which means the Professor decides to make a balloon out of the castaways' raincoats glued together with tree sap. By the time the Professor finishes his balloon, the jungle boy is shown wearing civilian clothes. As it ends up, the jungle boy unknowingly takes off in the balloon and lands on a Navy carrier. The radio news report states that he only knows the words "boy boy, girl girl, no no."
- Duke Williams (portrayed by Denny Miller) – A surfer who rides a tsunami from Hawaii and ends up on the island.
- Alexandre Gregor Dubov (portrayed by Harold J. Stone) – The castaways discover a reclusive, eccentric Soviet painter living on the island.
- El Presidente Pancho Hernando Gonzales Enrico Rodriguez of Ecuarico (portrayed by Nehemiah Persoff) – A Latin-American dictator is exiled on the island, foments a revolution and convinces Gilligan to become his puppet leader.
- Ivan and Igor (portrayed by Vincent Beck and Danny Klega) – Two Russian Cosmonauts in their space capsule land on the island.
- The Mosquitoes – A rock/pop group who came to the island to escape all their fans. A pastiche of The Beatles, they were annoyed into leaving by the castaways, who eventually got them to leave by the girls forming the musical group "The Honeybees". The Mosquitoes left, leaving behind one of their records, called "The Mosquitoes at Carnegie Hall". Their names are Bingo (portrayed by Les Brown Jr.), Bango (portrayed by George Patterson), Bongo (portrayed by Ed Wade), and Irving (portrayed by Kirby Johnson).
- Erika Tiffany-Smith (portrayed by Zsa Zsa Gabor) – Appeared in the season two episode "Erika Tiffany-Smith to the Rescue". Erika is a rich socialite and is a rival to Mrs. Howell. However, Mr. Howell takes a liking to Erika when she lets word out that she wants to buy the island; and, as usual, Mr. Howell takes all money offers. Erika falls in love with the Professor, ignores Mary Ann's sweetness and the Skipper's advances of romance, and treats Gilligan (like everyone else) as a butler. Ginger adores Erika because of her owning several movie studios; however, Ginger doesn't appear on screen with Erika at all. Erika leaves claiming to return and rescue the castaways and buy the island. Like other visitors, she never returns. She is heard on the radio at the end of the episode saying she doesn't know the coordinates of the island since she can't speak sailor lingo.
- Leo (portrayed by Zamba and Janos Prohaska during the water scenes) - A Nubian lion that was en route to a Singapore Zoo when its crate fell off the boat and washed up on the island. Gilligan called it Leo and worked on taming it in the style of a lion tamer where it even took a liking to corned beef. When its crate was repaired, a storm caused a high tide that washed it out to sea with Leo still in it. The radio new report stated that the Nubian lion's crate was found by a Navy destroyer and was in good health.
- Ghost (portrayed by Richard Kiel) – A Russian spy attempts to scare the castaways from the island.
- Harold Hecuba (portrayed by Phil Silvers) – Season 3, episode 4 was "The Producer" (airdate October 3, 1966). Obnoxious, overbearing, and smarmy Hollywood producer Harold Hecuba crash-lands on the island. When Ginger's acting fails to impress him, the castaways attempt to woo Hecuba with their collective talent in hopes of enticing him to rescue them. They put on an original play: A musical version of Hamlet consisting of songs sung to the instrumental melodies of popular arias from the operas Carmen and The Tales of Hoffmann (on records owned by Mr. and Mrs. Howell which were inexplicably taken aboard the Minnow and managed to survive the shipwreck). However, true to form as both guest to the island and conniving producer stereotype, Harold Hecuba sneaks back alone to civilization in the night. The castaways soon hear of his new hit smash‍—‌a musical version of Hamlet.
- Lord Beasley Waterford (portrayed by John McGiver) – A British nobleman who visits the island in search of a rare butterfly.
- Norbert Wiley (portrayed by Don Rickles) - A con man and kidnapper who arrives on the island.
- George Barkley (portrayed by Strother Martin) – A dishonest game show contestant that needs to survive a week on the supposedly-deserted island in order to win $10,000.
- Jonathan Kincaid (portrayed by Rory Calhoun) – A famous big game hunter who wants a human trophy and decides to hunt Gilligan.
- Ramoo (portrayed by Harold Sakata) - Jonathan Kincaid's assistant.
- Tongo the Ape Man (portrayed by Denny Miller) – An actor for a Tarzan-type ape man role arrives on the island to practice it. While encountering the castaways, he maintains his role until an incident with a large orangutan. The actor drops his tape recorder, and the castaways find out all about him. He escapes by helicopter, unwilling to rescue the castaways for fear that they might tell people about his cowardice with the real ape.

The castaways also encountered the following doppelgängers in order of appearance:

- Mr. Howell's double (portrayed by Jim Backus) – An unnamed look-alike for Mr. Howell who assumes his identity and ends up on the island after being exposed as a fake and falling off a boat. He later escapes from the island.
- Gilligan's double (portrayed by Bob Denver) – An unnamed Soviet secret agent who looks like Gilligan and arrives on the island.
- Eva Grubb (portrayed by Tina Louise) – A "Plain Jane" double for Ginger who arrives on the island and attempts to assume Ginger's identity in the episode "All About Eva."
- Girl Gorilla (performed by Stockard Channing) - A gorilla that walks away with the Gorilla in "Diamonds Are An Apes Best Friends".
