= Rollergirls (TV series) =

1978 American television series

- Created by: James Komack
- Directed by: James Komack; Burt Brinckerhoff; Gary Shimokawa
- Starring: Terry Kiser; Rhonda Bates; Candy Ann Brown; Joanna Cassidy; Marcy Hanson; Marilyn Tokuda
- Music by: Tony Asher; John Bahler; Kevin Clark
- Opening theme: "Roller Girls" performed by Shari Saba
- Country of origin: United States
- Original language: English
- No. of seasons: 1
- No. of episodes: 4

Production
- Executive producer: James Komack
- Producers: Stan Cutler; George Tricker; Neil Rosen
- Running time: 30 minutes
- Production company: The Komack Company

Original release
- Network: NBC
- Release: April 24 – May 10, 1978

Rollergirls is an American sitcom that was not picked up to series, with its four produced episodes burned off over a 17 day period on NBC, from April 24 to May 10, 1978.

== Premise ==
The series features the exploits of a fictional all-female roller derby team, the Pittsburgh Pitts, owned and managed by Don Mitchell (Terry Kiser).

== Cast ==
- Terry Kiser as Don Mitchell
- Rhonda Bates as Mongo Sue Lampert
- Candy Ann Brown J.B Johnson
- Joanna Cassidy as Selma "Books" Cassidy
- Marcy Hanson as Honey Bee Novak
- Marilyn Tokuda as Shana "Pipeline" Akira
- James Murtaugh as Howie Devine

== Episodes ==
Season #	Episode #	Title	Plot/Notes	Original air date
1	1	"Battle of the Sexes"	A five-woman roller skating team, the Pittsburgh Pitts, sets out to strike a rock 'em, sock 'em blow for womanhood in a race with an all-male team	April 24, 1978
1	2	"Come to Me, My Melancholy Mongo"	Her teammates secretly arrange for lonely, dateless Mongo to have a night of romance with the team's owner-coach.	May 1, 1978
1	3	"The Birth of the Pitts"	A half-time pep talk by their owner-coach prods members of the Pittsburgh Pitts to reflect on how they met and became a unit.	May 3, 1978
1	4	"One of Our Players Is Missing"	Honey Bee is angry when she is traded to the Rhode Island Hens team whose owner is threatening to foreclose the mortgage on the Pitts rink.	May 10, 1978
