= Cyndi Grecco =

American singer (born 1952)

- Born: May 19, 1952 (age 73); New York City
- Genres: Adult contemporary
- Occupation: Singer
- Years active: 1976–1989
- Labels: Private Stock Records

Cyndi Grecco (born May 19, 1952) is an American singer who performed the theme songs to the 1970s American television shows Laverne & Shirley and Blansky's Beauties.

The song, "Making Our Dreams Come True," featured Grecco accompanied by The Ron Hicklin Singers. It was released as a single on Private Stock Records label and spent two weeks at No. 25 in the Billboard Hot 100, where it peaked July 4 through July 10, 1976.

== Career ==
Composer Charles Fox and lyricist Norman Gimbel were hired by Laverne & Shirley creator Garry Marshall to write the show's theme song. While Fox was visiting Six Flags Magic Mountain theme park in California, Grecco caught his attention when she was singing in a pop group at the park. Fox shared the Laverne & Shirley song with Grecco and offered her the opportunity to audition. Accompanied by The Ron Hicklin Singers, Grecco sang the hit theme song and it was released it as a single. The song spent two weeks at No. 25 on the Billboard Hot 100 in 1976.

Managed by Janna Feliciano, then-wife of José Feliciano, Grecco provided the theme to the 1970s ABC television show Blansky's Beauties. She was a featured half-time performer and sang the U.S. National Anthem at the 1977 Sun Bowl.

Wish Upon a Star (1982), was Grecco's second album (only released in Canada).

== Discography ==
Albums

- Making Our Dreams Come True (1976)
- Wish Upon a Star (1982)

Singles

- "Making Our Dreams Come True"
- "Dancing, Dancing"
- "Hello Again"
- "This Time I'm in It for Love"
- "You Made Love Come True"
