= Phillip Glasser =

American former producer and actor

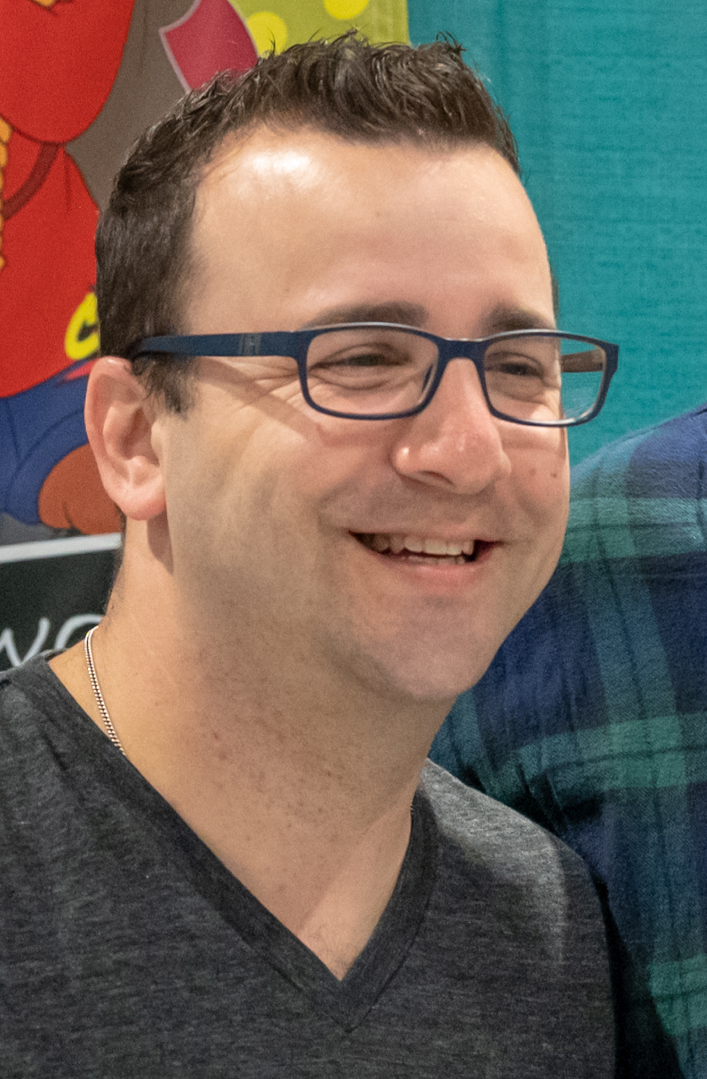
- Glasser at GalaxyCon Richmond in 2020
- Born: Phillip Glasser
- Occupations: Actor, film producer
- Years active: 1986–2002 (actor); 2007–2023 (producer)

Phillip Glasser is an American former producer and actor. He is best known for providing the voice of Fievel Mousekewitz in An American Tail (1986), its sequel An American Tail: Fievel Goes West (1991), and its spinoff animated TV series Fievel's American Tails (1992–93).

== Selected filmography ==
=== Actor ===
Film and television
Year	Title	Role	Notes
1986	An American Tail	Fievel Mousekewitz (voice)	
1987	Pound Puppies	Terry, Puppy 2, Freddie (voice)	3 episodes
1989	Full House	Young Danny	Episode: "Pal Joey"
1989	Satan's Princess	Joey	
1990	The Bradys	Jake Greenberg	Episode: "A Moving Experience"
1991	Gabriel's Fire	David Goldstein	Episode: "A Prayer for the Goldsteins"
1991	Tiny Toon Adventures	Pedro (voice)	Episode: "High Toon"
1991	An American Tail: Fievel Goes West	Fievel Mousekewitz (voice)	
1992	P. J. Sparkles	Peter (voice)	Television film
1992	Bebe's Kids	Opie (voice)	
1992	Fievel's American Tails	Fievel Mousekewitz (voice)	13 episodes
1992	Frosty Returns	Additional voices	Television film
1994	A Troll in Central Park	Gus (voice)	
1994	Boy Meets World	Ubaldo	Episode: "The Uninvited"
1996	Saved by the Bell: The New Class	Stanley	Episode: "Oh, Brother"
1996	Sabrina the Teenage Witch	Student #2, James Dean 2	2 episodes
1998	Star Trek: Insurrection	Young Ru'afo	Deleted scenes
1998	The Secret of NIMH 2: Timmy to the Rescue	Martin Brisby (voice)	Direct-to-video
1998	Fallen Arches	Scott Merchant	
1999–2000	Hang Time	Eugene Brown	26 episodes
2000	Cutaway	Cord	Television film
2002	Poolhall Junkies	Max	
2002	Sabretooth	Jason Kimble	Television film

=== Producer ===
Film
Year	Title	References
2007	Kickin' It Old Skool	
2013	Escape from Planet Earth	
2020	The War with Grandpa	
2023	Camp Hideout	
