= Marty Nadler =

American television producer and writer (1945–2026)

- Born: October 13, 1945; New York City, U.S.
- Died: August 26, 2026 (aged 80); Margate, Florida, U.S.
- Occupations: Television producer and writer

Marty Nadler (October 13, 1945 – August 26, 2026) was an American television producer and writer. He produced and wrote for television programs including Perfect Strangers, Happy Days (and its spin-off Laverne & Shirley), Chico and the Man, That's My Mama, Amen, The Hogan Family and The Redd Foxx Show.

Nadler died from complications of myasthenia gravis in Margate, Florida, on August 26, 2026, at the age of 80.
