= Making Our Dreams Come True =

Single by Cyndi Grecco

from the album Making Our Dreams Come True
- B-side: "Watching You"
- Released: May 1976
- Recorded: 1976
- Genre: Pop
- Length: 2:29
- Label: Private Stock Records 45086
- Songwriters: Charles Fox, Norman Gimbel
- Producers: Charles Fox, Janna Merlyn Feliciano

Cyndi Grecco singles chronology
"Making Our Dreams Come True" (1976)	"I Think I Can Make It" (1976)

"Making Our Dreams Come True" is a 1976 hit single written by Charles Fox and Norman Gimbel. It was recorded by Cyndi Grecco, then an unknown musician. The title track of her debut album, it was also used as the theme song to the 1976–1983 television sitcom Laverne & Shirley (where it was titled "We're Gonna Make It" in the first-season end credits).

"Making Our Dreams Come True" reached number 25 on the U.S. Billboard Hot 100 and number 21 on the Cash Box Top 100. The song reached number 16 in Canada on the RPM Weekly Top Singles chart. It spent 16 weeks on the U.S. charts, peaking in early July, and also reached number 13 on the Adult Contemporary chart. To date, it is Grecco's lone record to reach any chart.

== Chart performance ==
=== Weekly charts ===
Chart (1976)	Peak position
Australia Kent Music Report	65
Canadian RPM Top Singles	16
U.S. Billboard Adult Contemporary	13
U.S. Billboard Hot 100	25
U.S. Cash Box Top 100	21

=== Year-end charts ===
Chart (1976)	Rank
Canada	141
U.S. (Joel Whitburn's Pop Annual)	150

== Cover versions ==
Johnny Cash covered the song for a commercial for Nissan, highlighting the Japanese automaker's American workforce. As of 2023, the recording has yet to be officially released.

A country version of the song was used in the game Wasteland 3 for the final boss fight of the second DLC, The Cult of the Holy Detonation.

== See also ==
- List of 1970s one-hit wonders in the United States
