= List of blaxploitation films =

This is an alphabetical list of films belonging to the blaxploitation genre.

== A ==
- Aaron Loves Angela (1975)
- Abar, the First Black Superman a.k.a. In Your Face (1977)
- Abby (1974)
- Across 110th Street (1972)
- Action Jackson (1988)
- Adiós Amigo (1976)
- Alice (2022)
- Amazing Grace (1974)

== B ==
- Baadasssss! (2003)
- Bad Black & Beautiful (1973)
- The Bad Bunch (1973)
- Bamboo Gods and Iron Men (1974)
- Bare Knuckles (1977)
- The Baron (1977)
- Beat Street (1984)
- Big Time (1977)
- The Bingo Long Traveling All-Stars & Motor Kings (1976)
- Black (2008)
- BlacKkKlansman (2018)
- The Black Alley Cats (1973)
- The Black Angels (1970)
- Black Belt Jones (1974)
- Black Belt Jones 2 – The Tattoo Connection (1978)
- Black Brigade, a.k.a. Carter's Army (1970)
- The Black Bunch (1973)
- Black Caesar (1973)
- Black Cobra (1987)
- The Black Connection, a.k.a. Run Nigger Run (1974)
- Black Devil Doll (2007)
- Black Devil Doll From Hell (1984)
- Black Dynamite (2009)
- Black Emanuelle, a.k.a. Passion Plantation, a.k.a. White Emmanuelle (1975)
- Black Emanuelle 2 (1976)
- Black Eye (1974)
- Black Fist (1975)
- Black Force (1975)
- The Black Gestapo (1975)
- Black Girl (1972)
- The Black Godfather (1974)
- Black Gunn (1972)
- Black Heat (1976)
- Black Hooker, a.k.a. Black Mama, a.k.a. Street Sisters (1974)
- Black Joy (1977)
- The Black Klansman (1966)
- Black Like Me (1964)
- Black Lolita (1975)
- Black Mama White Mama (1973)
- Black Panther (2018)
- Black Rage (1972)
- Black Samson (1974)
- Black Samurai (1977)
- Black Shampoo (1976)
- Black Sister's Revenge (1976)
- The Black Six (1974)
- Black Snake (1973)
- Black Starlet, a.k.a. Black Gauntlet (1974)
- Blackenstein (1973)
- Blackjack (1978)
- Blacula (1972)
- Blind Rage (1978)
- Body and Soul (1981)
- Bone (1972)
- Bones (2001)
- Book of Numbers (1973)
- Boss Nigger (1975)
- Boss'n Up (2005)
- Breakin' (1984)
- Breakin' 2: Electric Boogaloo (1985)
- The Brother from Another Planet (1984)
- Brother John (1971)
- Brother on the Run (1973)
- Brotherhood of Death (1976)
- Brothers (1977)
- Buck and the Preacher (1972)
- Bucktown (1975)
- The Bus Is Coming (1971)
- Bustin' Loose (1981)

== C ==
- The Candy Tangerine Man (1975)
- Car Wash (1976)
- Carter's Army (1970)
- Chained Heat (1983)
- A Change of Mind (1969)
- Charcoal Black (1972)
- Charley One-Eye (1973)
- Cinnamon (2023)
- Cleopatra Jones (1973)
- Cleopatra Jones and the Casino of Gold (1975)
- Coffy (1973)
- Come Back, Charleston Blue (1972)
- Cool Breeze (1972)
- The Cool World (1963)
- Cooley High (1975)
- Coonskin (1975)
- Cornbread, Earl and Me (1975)
- Cosmic Slop (1994)
- Cotton Comes to Harlem (1970)
- Cover Girls (1977)

== D ==
- Darktown Strutters (1975)
- Dead Right a.k.a. If He Hollers, Let Him Go! (1968)
- Deadly Vengeance a.k.a. "Sweet Vengeance" a.k.a. "Dirty Trick" (1981/1970)
- Death Dimension a.k.a. Black Eliminator (1978)
- Death Drug (1978)
- Death Journey (1976)
- Death of a Snowman aka Soul Patrol (1978)
- Deliver Us From Evil a.k.a. Joey (1977)
- Detroit 9000 (1973)
- Django Unchained (2012)
- Diamonds (1975)
- Disco 9000 (1976)
- Disco Godfather (1979)
- Dr. Black and Mr. White (1976)
- Dr. Black, Mr. Hyde (1976)
- Dolemite (1975)
- Dolemite II: The Human Tornado (1976)
- Dolemite Is My Name (2019)
- Don't Play Us Cheap (1973)
- Drum (1976)
- Dynamite Brothers (1974)

== E ==
- Ebony, Ivory & Jade (1976)
- The Education of Sonny Carson (1974)
- Emma Mae (1976)

== F ==
- Fass Black a.k.a. Disco 9000 (1976)
- Fighting Mad a.k.a. Death Force (1978)
- The Final Comedown (1972)
- Five on the Black Hand Side (1973)
- For Love of Ivy (1968)
- Fox Style (1973)
- Foxtrap (1986)
- Foxy Brown (1974)
- Friday Foster (1975)

== G ==
- G.I. Bro a.k.a. Quel Maledetto Treno Blindato (1978)
- Gang Wars (1976)
- Ganja & Hess (1973)
- Gayniggers from Outer Space (1992)
- Georgia, Georgia (1972)
- Get Christie Love! (TV) (1974)
- Getting Over (1981)
- Golden Needles (1974)
- Gordon's War (1973)
- The Grasshopper (1970)
- Greased Lightning (1977)
- The Greatest (1977)
- The Guy from Harlem (1977)

== H ==
- Halls of Anger (1970)
- Hammer (1972)
- Hangup (1974)
- The Harder They Come (1972)
- Harlem Nights (1989)
- Heavy Traffic (1973)
- Hell Up in Harlem (1973)
- A Hero Ain't Nothin' But a Sandwich (1978)
- Hit! (1973)
- Hit Man (1972)
- The Hitter (1979)
- Honey Baby, Honey Baby a.k.a. Three Days in Beirut (1974)
- Honky (1971)
- Hood of Horror (2006)
- Hookers in Revolt (2008)
- Hot Potato (1976)
- How to Eat Your Watermelon in White Company... And Enjoy It (2005)
- The Human Tornado a.k.a. Dolemite II (1976)

== I ==
- I'm Charlie Walker (2022)
- I Escaped from Devil's Island (1973)
- If He Hollers, Let Him Go! (1968)
- I'm Gonna Git You Sucka (1988)
- Idlewild (2006)

== J ==
- J. D.'s Revenge (1976)
- Jackie Brown (1997)
- Jingle Jangle (2020)
- Jive Turkey a.k.a. Baby Needs a New Pair of Shoes (1974)
- Johnny Tough (1974)

== K ==
- Kid Vengeance a.k.a. Vengeance a.k.a. Take Another Hard Ride (1977)
- Killjoy (2000)
- Kiss my Baadasssss (1994)
- Krush Groove (1985)
- Kung Fu - Soul Brothers of Kung Fu (1977)

== L ==
- Lady Cocoa (1975)
- The Last Dragon (1985)
- The Last Fight (1983)
- Leadbelly (1976)
- The Legend of Nigger Charley (1972)
- Let's Do It Again (1975)
- Lialeh (1974)
- Live and Let Die (1973)
- The Lost Man (1969)
- A Low Down Dirty Shame (1994)

== M ==
- The Mack (1973)
- Man and Boy (1971)
- Mandingo (1975)
- Mean Johnny Barrows (1976)
- Mean Mother (1974)
- Melinda (1972)
- Miss Melody Jones (1973)
- Mr. Mean (1977)
- The Monkey Hustle (1976)
- The Muthers (1976)

== N ==
- No Way Back (1976)
- Norman... Is That You? (1976)

== O ==
- One Down, Two to Go (1982)
- Original Gangstas (1996)
- Othello, the Black Commando (1982)

== P ==
- Penitentiary (1979)
- Penitentiary II (1982)
- Penitentiary III (1987)
- Petey Wheatstraw (1977)
- A Piece of the Action (1977)
- Pipe Dreams (1976)
- Poor Pretty Eddie (1975)
- Proud Mary (2018)
- Putney Swope (1969)

== R ==
- The Return of Superfly (1990)
- Right On! (1971)
- The River Niger (1976)

== S ==
- Savage! (1973)
- Savage Sisters (1974)
- Scream Blacula Scream (1973)
- Shaft (1971)
- Shaft in Africa (1973)
- Shaft's Big Score (1972)
- Shaft (2000)
- Shaft (2019)
- Sheba, Baby (1975)
- Shorty the Pimp (1972)
- The Slams (1973)
- Slaughter (1972)
- Slaughter's Big Rip-Off (1973)
- Slaves (1969)
- Solomon King (1974)
- The Soul of Nigger Charley (1973)
- Soul Soldier (1970)
- Space Is the Place (1974)
- Sparkle (1976)
- Speeding Up Time (1971)
- The Split (1968)
- The Spook Who Sat by the Door (1973)
- The Story of a Three-Day Pass (1968)
- Sugar Hill (1974)
- Super Soul Brother (1978)
- Super Fly (1972)
- Super Fly T.N.T. (1973)
- Super Fly 2000 (2009)
- Superfly (2018)
- Sweet Jesus, Preacherman (1973)
- Sweet Sweetback's Baadasssss Song (1971)

== T ==
- Tales from the QuadeaD Zone (1987)
- ...tick...tick...tick... (1970)
- TNT Jackson (1974)
- That Man Bolt (1973)
- They Call Me Mister Tibbs! (1970)
- They Cloned Tyrone (2023)
- The Thing with Two Heads (1972)
- The Outlaw Johnny Black (2018)
- Thomasine & Bushrod (1974)
- Three the Hard Way (1974)
- Three Tough Guys (1974)
- Together Brothers (1974)
- Together for Days (1972)
- Top of the Heap (1972)
- Tough (1974)
- Tongue (1976)
- Tougher Than Leather (1988)
- Trick Baby (1973)
- Trouble Man (1972)
- Truck Turner (1974)

== U ==
- Undercover Brother (2002)
- Up Tight! (1968)
- Uptown Saturday Night (1974)

== V ==
- Vampire in Brooklyn (1995)
- Velvet Smooth (1976)

== W ==
- Walk the Walk (1970)
- Watermelon Man (1970)
- Welcome Home Brother Charles (a.k.a. Soul Vengeance)(1975)
- The Werewolf of Washington (1973)
- Which Way Is Up? (1977)
- Willie Dynamite (1974)

== Y ==
- Youngblood (1978)

== Z ==
- Zebra Killer (1974)

== Bibliography ==
- Lawrenc, Novotny (2007). Blaxploitation Films of the 1970s: Blackness and Genre (Studies in African American History and Culture). NY: Routledge; 1 edition. ISBN 978-0-203-93222-3
