= Badja Djola =

American actor (1948–2005)

- Born: Bernard Bradley; April 9, 1948; New York City, U.S.
- Died: January 8, 2005 (aged 56); Los Angeles County, California, U.S.
- Occupation: Actor
- Years active: 1979–2005
- Notable work: Mississippi Burning, Who's the Man?, Penitentiary, A Rage in Harlem

Badja Medu Djola (born Bernard Bradley; April 9, 1948 – January 8, 2005) was an American actor from Brooklyn, New York who worked primarily within black film. He is best known for Mississippi Burning, Penitentiary, A Rage in Harlem, and Who's the Man?. He was often seen in tough or villainous roles.

== Career ==
Djola's breakout role was as Leon Isaac Kennedy's cellmate, the villainous "Half Dead" Johnson, in the 1979 movie Penitentiary, which led to many more feature films, including a supporting role in Wes Craven's 1988 movie The Serpent and the Rainbow. He starred alongside Danny Glover in the 1991 film A Rage in Harlem and Doctor Dré in Who's the Man? (1993). In addition to movies, Djola appeared in several television shows, including The X-Files, Nash Bridges, and NYPD Blue. He also starred in theatre performances, with shows including Once in a Wife Time (1981)," Edmond (1984), 227, Southern Rapture (1993), and Dancing on Moonlight (1995),

== Personal life ==
Djola died of a heart attack on January 8, 2005, in Los Angeles, California.

== Filmography ==
=== Film ===
Year	Title	Role	Ref
1979	The Main Event	Heavyweight in Gym	
1979	Penitentiary	"Half Dead" Johnson	
1982	Night Shift	Cleon	
1984	The Lonely Guy	Native	
1985	The Lightship	Nate	
1988	The Serpent and the Rainbow	Lieutenant Gaston	
1988	Mississippi Burning	FBI Agent Monk	
1989	An Innocent Man	IA Detective John Fitzgerald	
1991	A Rage in Harlem	Slim	
1991	The Last Boy Scout	Alley Thug	
1991	Christmas on Division Street	Scorpio	
1992	The Waterdance	Decton	
1992	Eddie Presley	The Drycleaner (uncredited)	
1993	Who's the Man?	Lionel Douglas	
1993	Marked for Murder		
1994	Knight Rider 2010	Zeke	
1996	Heaven's Prisoners	Batist	
1997	Rosewood	John Bradley	
1997	The Brave	Rider	
1997	First Time Felon	Disciple Leader	
1998	Gunshy	Abel	
1998	The Players Club	The Doctor	
1998	Butter	Roscoe	
1999	Deterrence	Harvey	
1999	The Hurricane	Mobutu	
2000	Lost in the Pershing Point Hotel	"Fast Eddie"	
2000	The Price of Air	Sugar	
2001	Night at the Golden Eagle	Gabriel	
2005	Back in the Day	Grant Brown	
2005	Slipdream	Sahdu	

=== Television ===
Year	Title	Role	Episode/s	Ref
1981	Palmerstown, U.S.A.		"The Threat"	
1982	Tales of the Gold Monkey	Oomupwah	"Legends Are Forever"	
1984	Maximum Security	Prisoner Preacher	"Pilot"	
1987	Spenser: For Hire	Tyrone Blackwell	"Among Friends"	
1990	B.L. Stryker		"Grand Theft Hotel"	
1990	Wiseguy	Etoile de Joie	"Black Gold"	
1991	The 100 Lives of Black Jack Savage	Francoise Benoir	"The Not-So-Great Dictator"	
1993—1994	Roc	William Lawn	"Final Analysis" and "Citizen Roc: Part 2"	
1995	The X-Files	Napoleon "Neech" Manley	"The List"	
1997	Nash Bridges	Jack Archer	"Inside Out"	
1997	NYPD Blue	Clyde Bell	"Bad Rap"	
1997	The Last Don	Phil Sharkey	"Part III"	
1997	Millennium	Lacuna	"Sense and Antisense"	
1998	Brooklyn South	Clude Miller	"Skel in a Cell"	
1998	ER	Mike Lembreaux	"Shades of Gray"	
1998	Chicago Hope	Jean Baptiste Marche	"Austin, We Have a Problem"	
1998	Born Free	Motumbo	"Celebration of Life"	
2001	The Fugitive	Dominick	"Lagniappe"	
2001	The Lone Gunmen	Spike	"Maximum Byers"	
