= Leon Kennedy =

Leon Kennedy may refer to:

- Leon S. Kennedy, a character in the survival horror video game series Resident Evil
- Leon Isaac Kennedy, American actor, disc jockey, film producer and playwright
