= Thomas Penick =

Film editor

Thomas Marshall Penick (June 2, 1948 – March 18, 2016) was a writer and film editor who worked on numerous movies and projects, and was also a part of the L.A. Rebellion.

== Early life and education ==
Thomas Penick was born in Washington, D.C. and raised in Cleveland, Ohio. He was raised Baptist, but attended St. Aloysius Catholic School in Cleveland, Ohio where he ranked in the top half of the top 1% of all Catholic Schools in the nation. He attributed his academic success to "just reading everything in sight". Penick enjoyed sports and was a part of the 400-yard relay, football team, and basketball team at St. Aloysius. After middle school, Penick's family moved to California where he attended Los Angeles High School. Thomas had five siblings growing up, but that number increased to six when his cousin was sent out to California to live with his family. His mom had a ton of different jobs during his childhood such as being a nurse's aide, a licensed vocational nurse, a practical nurse, and then a registered nurse. Penick's father was a paratrooper who trained troops for the Korean War, and was described by Penick to be a "real tough guy". Thomas attended UCLA where he studied screenwriting and graduated with a bachelor's degree in theater arts/motion pictures.

== Career ==
In addition to writing his first book entitled "Yes... 1st Book of Poetry", Penick was involved in the making of a number of influential movies and films. In addition to working in the film industry, he also was a poet and contributed to numerous newsletters. First, Thomas directed the short film 69 Pickup (1969) for his UCLA Project One film. 69 Pickup is about two African-American men who pick up a white woman and then rob, beat, and sexually assault her. Penick reportedly made the film after becoming angry as a result of a breakup with his girlfriend at the time. He also made two more short films entitled 49 Pickup and 29 Pickup. After that, he went to work under an Oscar-award winning editor Michael Kahn on the TV pilot "Fuzz Brothers" (1973), in addition to the films The Spook Who Sat By the Door (1973) and Nightmare Circus (1974). Thomas went on to work for Paramount Pictures, where he served as an assistant editor on the Gordon Parks film Leadbelly (1976). Also working for Warner Bros., Thomas Penick worked as an assistant editor on Ken Russell's Altered States (1981). While attending UCLA, he befriended and worked alongside directors and fellow peers such as Jamaa Fanaka and Charles Burnett, in addition to helping them as a production manager and editor on My Brother's Wedding (1983). Penick wrote a book about Charles Burnett entitled Theefus, and also briefly worked on Burnett's work Killer of Sheep. Other works Penick worked on include Lady Sings the Blues (1972) and American Playhouse (1982). Alongside his fellow UCLA peers, Thomas was involved in the L.A. Rebellion film movement. Finally, he worked as an assistant film editor on a number of television series and trailers for MGM, including the miniseries "George Washington" (1984).

== Additional information ==
Penick achieved the fastest reading-time while attending St. Aloysius by first familiarizing himself with the weight of a book, and then using his unique ability to understand what is being said without reading word-for-word. His childhood nickname was "Bright Eyes" because he was said to be good at finding things and remembering where things are, even though he had bad eyesight. Penick originally wanted to attend Harvard University to become an attorney, and even though he wasn't too keen of UCLA, he ended up following in his older brother Clifford's footsteps and attended UCLA. Although his father was a paratrooper, the father couldn't stand the increasingly cold weather in Cleveland, Ohio, and decided to move the family to California where the weather is warmer. When given the choice via an academic counselor of either going to summer school at UCLA to bring up his grades or take a trip to West Africa, Penick decided, "Well, I'm going to West Africa".
