= Roger E. Mosley =

American actor (1938–2022)

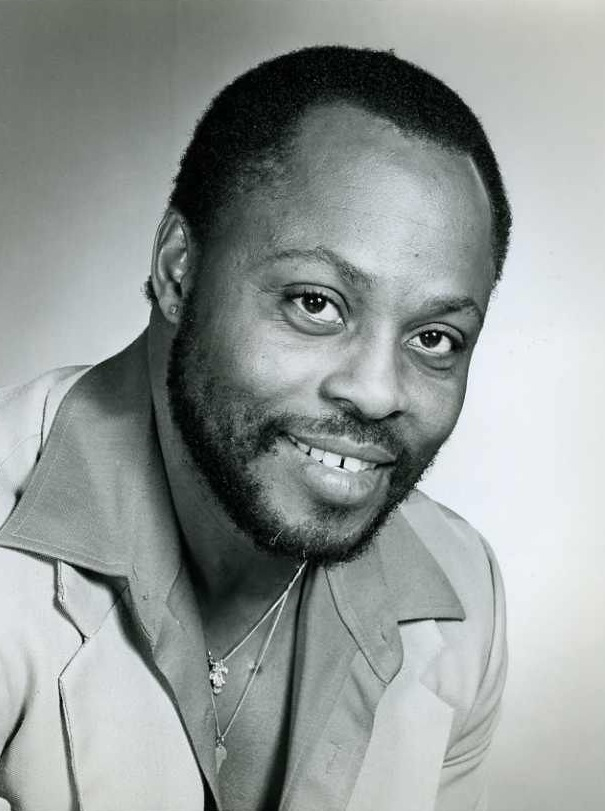
- Mosley, 1980.
- Born: Roger Earl Mosley; December 18, 1938; Los Angeles, California, U.S.
- Died: August 7, 2022 (aged 83); Los Angeles, California, U.S.
- Occupations: Actor; director; writer
- Years active: 1971–2021
- Known for: Playing Theodore "T.C." Calvin in Magnum, P.I.
- Spouse: Antoinette Laudermilk
- Children: 3

Roger Earl Mosley (/ˈmoʊzli/; December 18, 1938 – August 7, 2022) was an American actor, director, and writer best known for his role as the helicopter pilot Theodore "T.C." Calvin in the CBS television series Magnum, P.I., which originally aired from 1980 until 1988.

== Early life and education ==
Born on December 18, 1938, in Los Angeles, California, and raised by his mother, Eloise, Mosley grew up in the Imperial Courts public housing in the Watts neighborhood Mosley attended Jordan High School.

== Career ==
Mosley appeared as Monk in Terminal Island (1973). Other actors in the feature were Phyllis Davis, Don Marshall, Ena Hartman, and Tom Selleck, who would later star in the television series Magnum, P.I. which would also feature Mosley. In 1974, Mosley founded the Watts Repertory Company.

Mosley's most prominent film role was his 1976 starring turn as the title character in Leadbelly, a biography of the musician directed by Gordon Parks. In an article in the November 1982 issue of Ebony, Mosley said that this was his favorite role.

Mosley appeared in Magnum, P.I. from 1980 to 1988. He had a role as Tom Selleck's friend, helicopter pilot Theodore "T.C." Calvin, who operates his own tourist charter, Island Hoppers. He later appeared in season five of Las Vegas as the billionaire friend of Montecito owner A.J. Cooper (Tom Selleck).

Mosley came out of retirement to appear on the Magnum, P.I. reboot episode "A Kiss Before Dying" as Booky, T.C.'s barber, on March 11, 2019. Actor Stephen Hill, who played T.C. in the new series, said, "It is truly an honor for us to welcome an original cast member of Magnum, P.I.; one who embodied the role of T.C. with such thoughtful and dignified talent."

Mosley guest-starred on such shows as Night Court, Kung Fu, Starsky & Hutch, Kojak, The Rockford Files, Baretta, and Sanford and Son. He also played a role in Roots: The Next Generations. Mosley made a memorable appearance in the 1973 film The Mack as the militant brother of the main character Goldie. He appeared in other blaxploitation films of the period, including Hit Man (1972); Sweet Jesus, Preacherman (1973); Darktown Strutters (1975); and The River Niger (1976).

Mosley's other film credits include McQ (1974) with John Wayne, The Greatest (1977, as Sonny Liston), Semi-Tough (1977), Heart Condition (1990), and Pentathlon (1994). He also starred in the television series Hangin' with Mr. Cooper (1992–1993) as Coach Ricketts in a recurring role with comedian/actor Mark Curry, and in the film A Thin Line Between Love and Hate (1996) with Martin Lawrence, Lynn Whitfield, and Bobby Brown.

Additionally, he appeared as a celebrity guest on The $25,000 Pyramid for a week's worth of shows in July 1983, July 1984, and June 1985.

== Personal life ==
Mosley was married to Antoinette Laudermilk; they were together for nearly sixty years.

Mosley became a certified private helicopter pilot. When making Magnum, P.I., he was not allowed to do his own stunts. A pilot wearing a body stocking with false muscles was used instead. Mosley did not smoke, use drugs or drink alcohol, and insisted that his Magnum, P.I. character also did not.

At the 2013 HAI Heli-Expo in Las Vegas, a ceremony for the restored MD 500D helicopter was held. Both Mosley and fellow Magnum, P.I. co-star Larry Manetti autographed the nose of the helicopter.

== Car crash and death ==
On August 4, 2022, Mosley was involved in a major car crash in Lynwood, California, leaving him in critical condition, paralyzed from the shoulders down. He later died from his injuries on August 7, 2022, at Cedars-Sinai Medical Center at the age of 83.

== Filmography ==
=== Film ===
| Year | Title | Role(s) |
|---|---|---|
| 1972 | The New Centurions | Truck Driver |
| 1972 | Hickey & Boggs | |
| 1972 | Hit Man | Huey |
| 1973 | The Mack | Olinga Mickens |
| 1973 | Sweet Jesus, Preacherman | Holmes / Lee |
| 1973 | Terminal Island | Monk |
| 1974 | McQ | Rosey |
| 1975 | Darktown Strutters | Mellow |
| 1976 | The River Niger | Big Moe Hayes |
| 1976 | Stay Hungry | Newton |
| 1976 | Leadbelly | Huddie "Lead Belly" Ledbetter |
| 1976 | Drum | Slave |
| 1977 | The Greatest | Sonny Liston |
| 1977 | Big Time | J.J. |
| 1977 | Semi-Tough | Puddin Patterson Sr. |
| 1978 | Cruise Into Terror | Nathan |
| 1979 | The Jericho Mile | Cotton Crown |
| 1979 | Steel | Lionel |
| 1980 | Attica | Frank Green |
| 1980 | Pray TV | Willie Washington/Leroy Washington |
| 1981 | The White Lions | John Kani |
| 1990 | Heart Condition | Captain Wendt |
| 1992 | Unlawful Entry | Officer Roy Cole |
| 1994 | Pentathlon | John Creese |
| 1996 | A Thin Line Between Love and Hate | Smitty |
| 1998 | Letters from a Killer | Horton |
| 2000 | Hammerlock | Sgt. James Hammer |

=== Partial television credits ===
| Year | Title | Role | Notes |
|---|---|---|---|
| 1971 | Cannon | Porter | Episode: "Death Is a Double-Cross" |
| 1972 | Sanford and Son | Norman Blood | Episode: "Blood is Thicker than Junk" |
| 1974 | Kojak | Stutz | Episode: "You Can't Tell a Hurt Man How to Holler" |
| 1974 | Kung Fu | Seth | Episode: "In Uncertain Bondage" |
| 1975 | McCloud | Dolan | Episode: "Return to The Alamo" |
| 1975 | Switch | Walter | Episode: "Las Vegas Roundabout" |
| 1975 | The Rookies | Rawlins | Episode: "Dead Heat" |
| 1975 | Baretta | Det. Rudy Davis | Episode: "Sharper than a Serpent's Tooth" |
| 1977 | The Rockford Files | Electric Larry | Episode: "Dirty Money, Black Light” |
| 1977 | Starsky & Hutch | The Baron | Episode: "The Set-Up: Part 2" |
| 1978 | The Other Side of Hell | Jim Baker | TV movie |
| 1978 | The Life and Times of Grizzly Adams | Isaac | Episode: "The Runaway" |
| 1979 | Starsky & Hutch | Big Red McGee | Episode: "Huggy Can't Go Home" |
| 1979 | I Know Why the Caged Bird Sings | Bailey Sr. | TV movie |
| 1980–1988 | Magnum, P.I. | Theodore 'TC' Calvin | 158 episodes |
| 1986 | Danger Bay | Hari Mubaru | Episode: "The Leopard's Spots" |
| 1987 | The Love Boat | Jeffrey T. Gilbert | Episode: "Who Killed Maxwell Thorn?" |
| 1992–1993 | Hangin' with Mr. Cooper | Coach Ricketts | 10 episodes |
| 1994 | The Sinbad Show | Sgt. Al Beckley | Episode: "Adoption: Part 2" |
| 1994 | RoboCop | Frank Uno | Episode: "Ghosts of War" |
| 1996 | Women: Stories of Passion | Freddy | Episode: "The Boxer" |
| 1996 | In the House | Buff | Episode: "To Die For" |
| 1999–2000 | Rude Awakening | Milton 'Milt' Johnson | 20 episodes |
| 2000 | Walker, Texas Ranger | Fred Carter | Episode: "Justice Delayed" |
| 2001 | Arliss | Mudcat Burrell | Episode: "Like No Business I Know" |
| 2003 | What Should You Do? | Kidnapper | |
| 2003 | The District | Temple's Father | Episode: "Bloodlines" |
| 2007 | Las Vegas | Roger | Episode: "When Life Gives You Lemon Bars" |
| 2019; 2021 | Magnum P.I. | John Booky | 2 episodes |
