= Paul Benjamin =

American actor (1935–2019)

- Benjamin in Do the Right Thing (1989)
- Born: February 4, 1935; Pelion, South Carolina, U.S.
- Died: June 28, 2019 (aged 84); Los Angeles, California, U.S.
- Occupation: Actor
- Years active: 1966–2016
- Known for: ML – Do the Right Thing; Jim Harris – Across 110th Street; English - Escape From Alcatraz

Paul Benjamin (February 4, 1935 – June 28, 2019) was an American actor known for his work in film and television during the 1970s and 1980s, particularly in gritty crime dramas and socially grounded stories. He was respected for portraying streetwise, morally complex characters whose actions often set larger events into motion.

Benjamin is best known for his role as Jimmy Harris in Across 110th Street (1972), a landmark crime film exploring race, power, and urban violence in New York City. Harris is a criminal figure involved in the robbery of an Italian Mafia operation, during which several mobsters are killed and a large sum of money is stolen. Though Harris appears briefly, he serves as a central narrative force in the film, becoming the man sought by both the Italian Mafia and Harlem’s criminal organizations as they attempt to recover the stolen money. Benjamin’s performance gives the character a sense of realism and desperation, grounding the film’s larger conflict in human motive rather than abstraction.

He later appeared in Hoodlum (1997), portraying an elder figure within Harlem’s criminal world during the Prohibition era. His presence contributed to the film’s historical texture and sense of generational continuity.

Throughout his career, Benjamin frequently portrayed men operating on the margins of power—figures shaped by survival, opportunity, and consequence rather than ideology. His performances were marked by restraint and authenticity, lending credibility to films concerned with crime, race, and social tension.

== Early life ==
Benjamin was born to Fair, a Baptist preacher (1890–1950), and Rosa Benjamin (née Butler; 1895–1940) in Pelion, South Carolina, the youngest of 12 children. Benjamin moved to Columbia, South Carolina, with an older brother after the death of his parents. Benjamin attended C.A. Johnson High School and later enrolled at Benedict College.

== Career ==
Benjamin relocated to New York and studied at the Herbert Berghof Studio. He made his film debut in 1969 as a bartender in Midnight Cowboy. After small roles in Sidney Lumet's The Anderson Tapes (1971) and Born to Win (1971), he did extensive television work in the 1970s.

HIs 1970s film work includes a major role in Barry Shear's Across 110th Street (1972), and smaller parts in Shear's western The Deadly Trackers (1973), Michael Campus' The Education of Sonny Carson (1974), Arthur Marks' Friday Foster (1975), Gordon Parks' biopic Leadbelly (1976), and Don Siegel's prison film Escape from Alcatraz (1979). He performed in the TV adaptations of I Know Why the Caged Bird Sings (1979). He starred in the 1987 HBO movie The Man Who Broke 1,000 Chains, based on the novel by Robert E. Burns.

On the big screen in the 1980s and 1990s, he acted in Gideon's Trumpet (1980), Some Kind of Hero (1982) opposite Richard Pryor, Martin Ritt's drama film Nuts (1987) starring Barbra Streisand, Pink Cadillac (1989) with Clint Eastwood, Spike Lee's Do the Right Thing (1989), Robert Townsend's The Five Heartbeats (1991), Bill Duke's Hoodlum (1997), and John Singleton's Rosewood (1997).

On television, he appeared in the 1989 episode of In The Heat of the Night as a death row inmate and in the 1994 pilot episode of ER, which led to his recurring role of homeless man Al Ervin during the next few seasons. Benjamin worked on the American Masters documentary of Pulitzer Prize-winning author Ralph Ellison, which aired on PBS. He acted in an episode of the 14th season of Law & Order entitled "Identity" (2003) and an episode of The Shield. After 2000, he acted mainly in independent films like Stanley's Gig, The Station Agent, Deacons for Defense, and James Hunter's 2005 drama Back in the Day.

== Death ==
Benjamin died on June 28, 2019, in Los Angeles at age 84.

== Filmography ==
- Midnight Cowboy (1969) - Bartender - New York
- The Anderson Tapes (1971) - Jimmy
- Born to Win (1971) - Fixer
- Across 110th Street (1972) - Jim Harris
- The Deadly Trackers (1973) - Jacob
- The Education of Sonny Carson (1974) - Pops
- Distance (1975) - Sgt. Elwood Horne
- Friday Foster (1975) - Sen. David Lee Hart
- Leadbelly (1976) - Wes Ledbetter
- One in a Million: The Ron LeFlore Story (1978) - John LeFlore
- I Know Why the Caged Bird Sings (1979, TV movie) - Freeman
- Escape from Alcatraz (1979) - English
- Gideon's Trumpet (1980, TV movie) - Artis
- Some Kind of Hero (1982) - Leon
- Deadly Force (1983) - Lester
- Nuts (1987) - Harry Harrison
- Do the Right Thing (1989) - ML
- Pink Cadillac (1989) - Judge
- The Five Heartbeats (1991) - Mr. King
- The Super (1991) - Gilliam
- Drop Squad (1994) - Wellington Cosbie
- The Fence (1994) - Del Reston
- New York Undercover (1995) - The Professor
- Rosewood (1997) - James Carrier
- Hoodlum (1997) - Whispers
- The Breaks (1999) - Clerk
- Stanley's Gig (2000) - Teddy Branson
- The Station Agent (2003) - Henry Styles
- Back in the Day (2005) - Cody
- Ascension Day (2007) - Sam
- The Tall Man (2011) - Dallas
- Occupy, Texas (2016) - Mr. Goodman
