= Welcome Home Brother Charles =

- Theatrical release poster
- Directed by: Jamaa Fanaka
- Written by: Jamaa Fanaka
- Produced by: Jamaa Fanaka
- Starring: Marlo Monte; Reatha Grey; Stan Kamber
- Cinematography: James Babij
- Distributed by: Crown International Pictures
- Release date: 1975
- Running time: 91 minutes
- Country: United States
- Language: English

Welcome Home Brother Charles (also known as Soul Vengeance) is a 1975 American blaxploitation film written and directed by Jamaa Fanaka. The film stars Marlo Monte as a wrongfully imprisoned man who seeks vengeance upon his transgressors using his prehensile penis. The film, which was shot on weekends over the course of seven months, was completed while Fanaka was a student of UCLA Film School.

== Cast ==
- Marlo Monte as Charles Murray
- Reatha Grey as Carmen
- Stan Kamber as Jim
- Tiffany Peters as Christina Freeman
- Ben Bigelow as Harry Freeman
- Jake Carter as N.D.
- Jackie Ziegler as Twyla
- Ed Sander as Judge
- Teri Hayden as Judge's Wife
- Stephen Schenck as The Prosecutor
- Kamala James as Prosecutor's Wife

== Home media ==
In 2018, the film was restored in 2K and released on DVD and Blu-ray by Vinegar Syndrome as a double feature with the film Emma Mae.
