= Too Scared to Scream =

Too Scared to Scream (aka The Doorman)
- Theatrical Poster
- Directed by: Tony Lo Bianco
- Written by: Neal Barbera; Glenn Leopold
- Produced by: Mike Connors
- Starring: Mike Connors; Anne Archer; Leon Isaac Kennedy; Ian McShane
- Cinematography: Larry Pizer
- Edited by: Michael Economou (Supervising Editor); Ed Beyer (Editor)
- Music by: Georges Garvarentz
- Distributed by: The Movie Store
- Release date: September 28, 1984
- Running time: 99 minutes
- Country: United States
- Language: English

Too Scared to Scream (also known as The Doorman) is a 1984 American independent slasher film directed by Tony Lo Bianco. It stars Mike Connors (who also served as producer on the film), Anne Archer and Ian McShane, with a supporting cast of John Heard, Maureen O'Sullivan and Murray Hamilton.

Too Scared to Scream was originally shot in 1981 and intended for a 1982 release, but was shelved due to the production company going out of business; it later premiered in 1984 and received a theatrical release in 1985.

== Premise ==
An unknown assailant is killing the tenants of an exclusive, high-rise apartment building in New York City. The police suspect the doorman is involved and place an undercover police officer in the building to gather evidence on him.

== Cast ==
- Mike Connors as Lieutenant Alex Dinardo
- Anne Archer as Kate Bridges
- Leon Isaac Kennedy as Frank
- Ian McShane as Hardwick
- Ruth Ford as Irma
- John Heard as Sid, Lab Technician
- Carrie Nye as Graziella
- Maureen O'Sullivan as Mother
- Murray Hamilton as Jack
- Val Avery as Medical Examiner
- Sully Boyar as Sydney Blume
- Ken Norris as Mike
- Chet Doherty as Edward
- Karen Rushmore as Nadine
- Rony Clanton as Barker
- Beeson Carroll as Barry Moyer
- Victoria Bass as Cynthia Oberman
- Dick Boccelli as Benny
- Fred Ford as Man At Bar
- Ernesto Gasco as The Waiter
- Adrienne Howard as Louise
- Yvonne Talton Kersey as Mamie
- Gaetano Lisi as Guard
- Harry Madsen as Lyman
- John Ring as Irishman
