= Velvet Smooth =

1976 American blaxploitation film

- Film poster
- Directed by: Michael L. Fink
- Written by: Leonard Michaels; Jan Weber
- Produced by: Michael L. Fink; Joel Schild; Marvin Schild
- Starring: Johnnie Hill
- Cinematography: Jay Dubin
- Distributed by: Howard Mahler Films
- Release date: June 30, 1976
- Running time: 93 minutes
- Country: United States
- Language: English
- Budget: $20,000
- Box office: $770,000

Velvet Smooth is a 1976 American blaxploitation film directed by Michael L. Fink and starring Johnnie Hill. The screenplay concerns a crime lord who hires a female private detective to find out who is stealing his business. This was the only film role for Hill and co-star Emerson Boozer who had played for the New York Jets (1966–1975). It is also notable for being one of the last blaxploitation films to have a central female detective.

== Plot ==
Somebody's running a takeover on crime lord King Lathrop's (Owen Watson) operation using goons in undistinguished full-face masks. Clueless, King Lathrop calls private detective Velvet Smooth (Johnnie Hill) for help. With the help of her friends Ria (Elsie Roman), a lawyer, and Frankie (René Van Clief), she infiltrates the criminal underworld to investigate.

Velvet finds this may be an inside job led by King Lathrop's man Calvin (James Durrah). When Velvet reports this to Lathrop, he denies it at first, but the problems come closer to Calvin. Hurt by it all, Lathrop fires Calvin. Although Lathrop thinks Calvin masterminded the takeover on his own, Velvet remains unconvinced and seeks further to find out who was the man behind the man.

== Cast ==
- Johnnie Hill as "Velvet Smooth"
- Owen Watson (credited as Owen Wat-son) as "King" Lathrop
- Emerson Boozer as Mat
- Rene Van Clief as Frankie
- Elsie Roman as Ria
- Moses Lyllia (credited as Moses Illiya) as Sergeant Barnes
- Frank Ruiz as Lieutenant Ramos
- James Durrah as Calvin Christopher
- Thomas Agero as "Snake"
- Wilfredo Roldan (credited as Wildredo Roldan) as Rodriquez
- Michael Scorpio as Martinez
- Allen Ayers Jr as Johnson
- Hector Quinones as Player
- Sydney Filson (credited as Sidney Filson) as Dealer
- Sam Schwartz as Captain O'Reilly
- Gary Catus as "Digger"
- Tanka Ramos as Thug With Snake
- Teddy Wilson as Masked Man #1
- Butch Oglesby as Masked Man #2
- Chino Diaz as Masked Man #3/Barnes' Gang
- James Martin as Masked Man #4 / Barnes' Gang
- Jack Levy as Dry Cleaning Store Owner
- Russell Brown as Eddie "Newspaper Eddie"

== Home media ==
The films was released on Blu-ray by Dark Force Entertainment on November 12, 2023.

Former Mystery Science Theater 3000 cast members Michael J. Nelson, Kevin Murphy and Bill Corbett released a RiffTrax audio commentary of the movie on February 28, 2020.

== In media ==
The poster influenced the artwork for the fictional film "Sister Night" in the Watchmen (TV series).

== See also ==
- List of blaxploitation films
- List of RiffTrax
