= Jayne Kennedy =

American actress, model and television personality (born 1951)

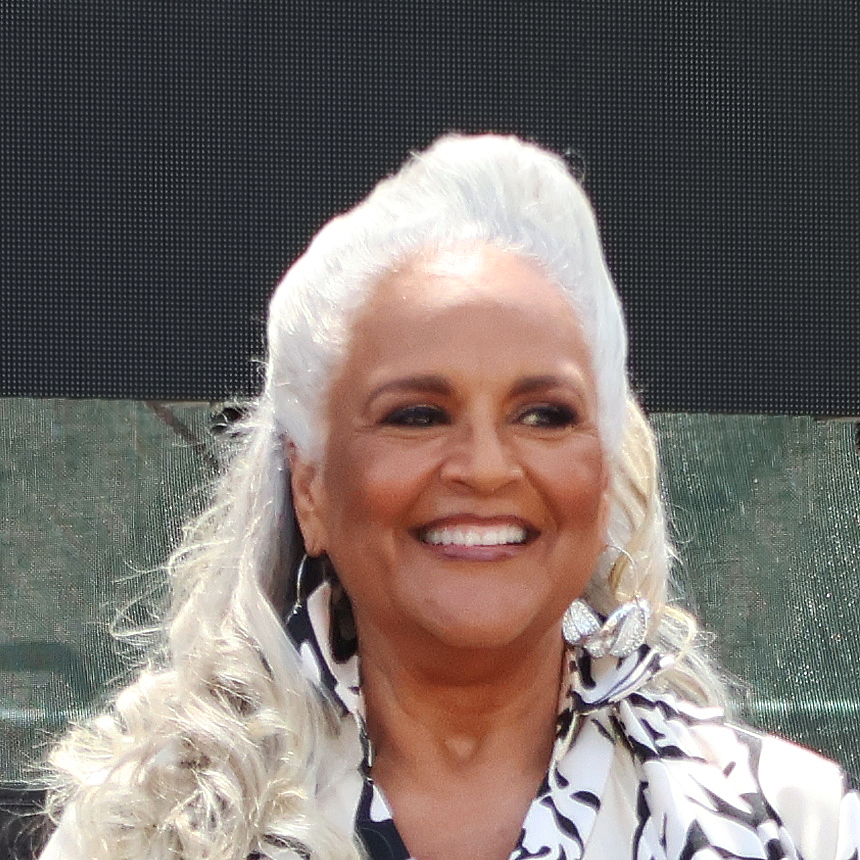
- Kennedy at the LA Times Festival of Books in April 2026
- Born: Jayne Harrison; October 27, 1951 (age 74); Washington, D.C., U.S.
- Other name: Jayne Overton
- Occupations: Actress; model; sportscaster; television personality; producer; writer; philanthropist
- Years active: 1969–1990
- Title: Miss Ohio USA
- Term: 1970–1971
- Predecessor: Marlynn Singleton
- Successor: Karen M. Haus
- Spouses: Leon Isaac Kennedy (m. 1971; div. 1982) Bill Overton (m. 1985)
- Children: 4
- Awards: NAACP Image Award (1982): Outstanding Actress in a Motion Picture (Body and Soul)

Jayne Kennedy Overton (née Harrison; born October 27, 1951) is an American television personality, actress, model, corporate spokeswoman, producer, writer, public speaker, philanthropist, and sports broadcaster.

== Personal life ==
Jayne Kennedy was born Jayne Gill Harrison in Washington, D.C., one of six children. Her parents Herbert and Virginia Harrison taught their children to "aim high, give God most of the credit, suffer disappointments silently, and avoid maliciousness." Kennedy was raised in Wickliffe, Ohio. In high school, she was on the cheerleading squad, was a member of the National Honor Society, was vice-president of the sophomore class, and president of the junior class.

A year after graduating from high school, Harrison met Leon Isaac Kennedy, a DJ and a struggling writer/actor. They married in 1971. Motown singer/songwriter Smokey Robinson served as best man at their wedding. They divorced in 1982.

In May 1985, Kennedy married actor Bill Overton in Bermuda. The wedding was small, and the parents of both Kennedy and Overton attended. The couple has four children: Overton's daughter Cheyenne (b. 1982) and their three daughters Savannah Re (b. November 20, 1985), Kopper Joi (b. May 17, 1989) and Zaire Ollyea (b. September 15, 1995). Kennedy and Overton celebrated their 35th wedding anniversary in May 2020.

== Career ==
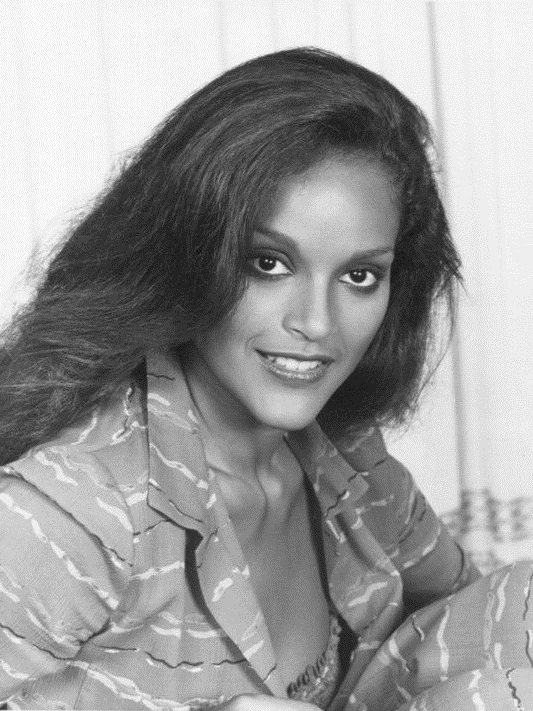
Kennedy in 1980

Kennedy was crowned Miss Ohio USA in 1970, going on to compete in the top ten in Miss USA 1970.

In 1971, Kennedy first appeared as a dancer in Rowan and Martin's Laugh-In, and performed with Bob Hope's Bases Around the World Christmas Tour (Vietnam, Japan, Thailand, Spain, and Cuba), which led to three years with The Dean Martin Show as a singer/dancer.

Throughout the 1970s, Kennedy played guest roles in such television shows as The Six Million Dollar Man, Sanford and Son, and Starsky & Hutch. She found work in many commercials of the era for such companies as Foster Grant, Chrysler Corporation, and McDonald's. She also played a lead role in the 1977 film Big Time, which featured a soundtrack by the film's producer Smokey Robinson.

In 1978, Kennedy replaced Phyllis George as co-anchor for The NFL Today on CBS, and she became the first African-American woman anchor of a network TV sports show. After a contractual dispute with the network, she went on to host the short-lived Speak Up, America in 1980.

Kennedy won the 1982 NAACP Image Award for Outstanding Actress in a Motion Picture for her performance as Julie Winters in the 1981 film Body and Soul co-starring then–husband Leon Isaac Kennedy.

Kennedy won an Emmy Award for her work hosting the 1982 Rose Bowl.

In 1982 she began hosting the syndicated television show Greatest Sports Legends, in which she interviewed such luminaries as Kareem Abdul-Jabbar and Johnny Unitas.

During the mid-1980s Kennedy appeared in TV commercials for The Coca-Cola Company’s Tab soft drink, and for Jovan Musk perfume. Kennedy joined the exercise-video craze of the mid-1980s with the release of her own video "Love Your Body," which was distributed by RCA/Columbia Pictures Home Video. She advised in the video to "[e]stablish a positive belief in yourself. Learn what your body needs and love it for what it is."

In 1990, Kennedy and Bill Overton produced The Journey of the African American, with performances in Atlanta and a 30-week run in Los Angeles.

In the early 1990s, Kennedy was at the height of her career when a private video of her and Leon Isaac was leaked. She subsequently lost “every contract” she had, and it derailed her career and deeply affected her wellbeing. Part of Kennedy's subsequent recovery included writing her memoir Plain Jayne.

Kennedy has added her support to many charitable causes over the years through appearances and speaking engagements. She co-hosted "The Lou Rawls Parade of Stars" in 1986, which raised $10 million for The United Negro College Fund. Kennedy was a keynote speaker at the Evanston Martin Luther King celebration in 1987. In 1988, she became the national spokesperson for The National Council of Negro Women, which presented annual, nationwide Black Family Reunion Celebration clinics and seminars. She was a speaker at the 12th Annual Freedom Fund Dinner in Columbia, South Carolina in 1990.

== Selected filmography ==
Film

- 1973: Group Marriage as Judy
- 1975: Let's Do It Again as Girl at Factory
- 1976: The Muthers as Serena
- 1977: Big Time as Shana Baynes
- 1978: Death Force (aka Fighting Mad) as Maria Russell
- 1981: Body and Soul as Julie Winters (NAACP Image Award: Best Actress)

Television

- 1973: Ironside as Maylene (Season 7, episode 12: "The Last Payment")
- 1974: Banacek as Girl Demonstrator (Season 2, episode 6: "Rocket to Oblivion")
- 1974: Sanford and Son as Brenda (Season 4, episode 5: "There'll Be Some Changes Made")
- 1975: The Six Million Dollar Man as Louise (Season 3, episode 4: "The Song and Dance Spy")
- 1976: The Rockford Files as Janice (Season 2, episode 21: "Foul on the First Play")
- 1977: The New Adventures of Wonder Woman as Carolyn Hamilton (Season 2, episode 5: "Knockout")
- 1977: Police Woman as Cora (Season 4, episode 4: "The Inside Connection")
- 1978-1980: The NFL Today – Reporter (NFL pre-game show)
- 1979: Mysterious Island of Beautiful Women as Chocolate (TV movie)
- 1980: CHiPs as Pat Blake (Season 3, episode 18: "Kidnap")
- 1980: Circus of the Stars #5 (TV special)
- 1981: CHiPs as Paula Woods (Season 5, episode 12: "Mitchell and Woods")
- 1981: The Love Boat as Kelsey (Season 4, episodes 25 & 26: "This Year's Model/The Model Marriage/Vogue Rogue/Too Clothes for Comfort/Original Sin", Parts 1 & 2)
- 1983: The Love Boat as Kate Langley (Season 6, episode 20: "The Zinging Valentine/The Very Temporary Secretary/Final Score")
- 1983: Diff'rent Strokes as Mrs. Jenkins (Season 6, episode 7: "The Moonlighter")
- 1984: Benson as Elizabeth Burnett (Season 6, episode 3: "Let's Get Physical")
- 1986: Benson as Elizabeth Burnett (Season 7, episode 20: "Three on a Mismatch")
- 1986: 227 as Betty Mumphrey (Season 2, episode 3: "Washington Affair")
- 2024: You Are Looking Live! as herself, documentary on The NFL Today

== Book ==
- Kennedy, Jayne (September 2, 2025). Plain Jayne: A Memoir (First hardcover ed.). Los Angeles: Andscape Books. ISBN 978-1368110952. OCLC 1453617329.
