= Synthia Saint James =

American visual artist

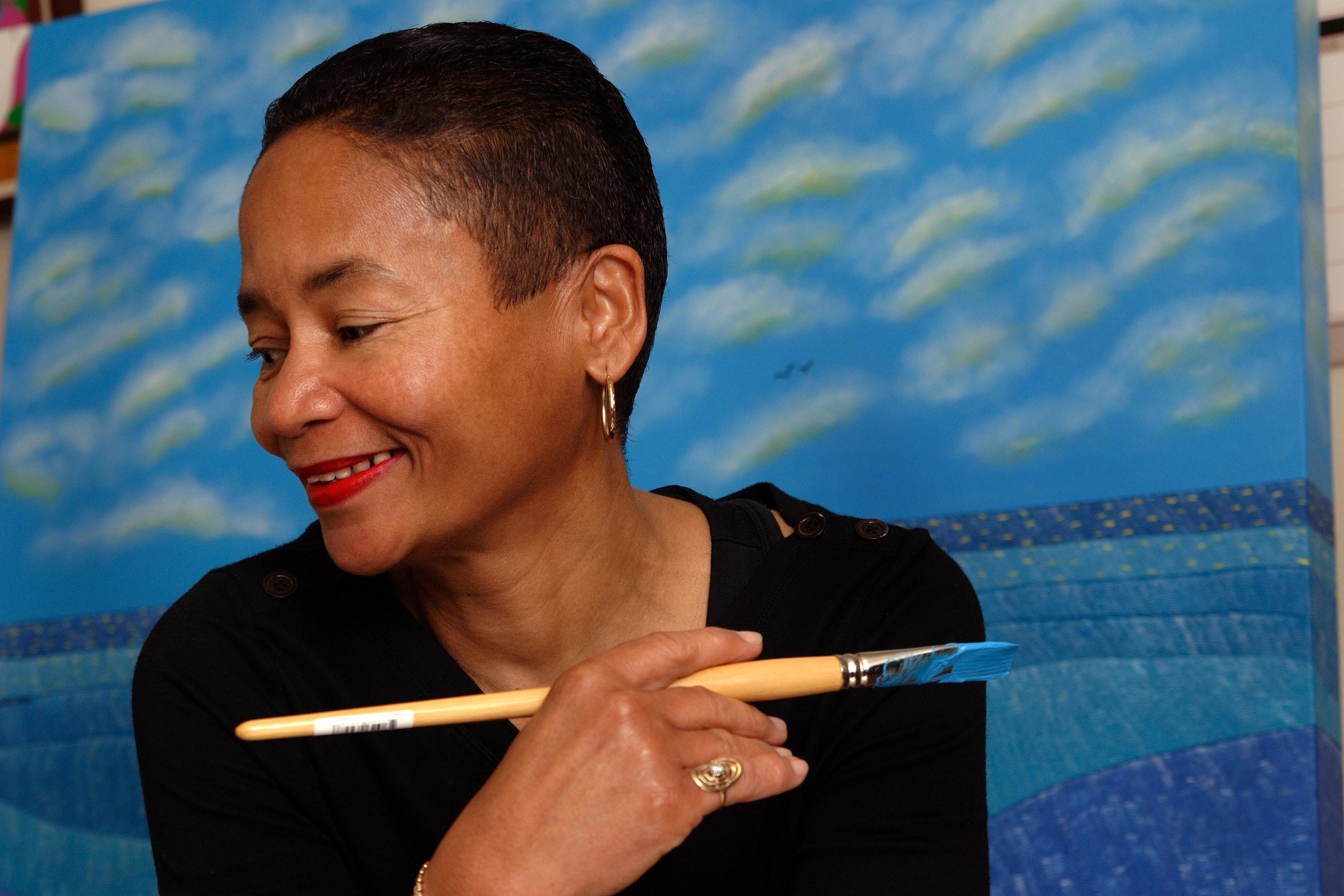
- Born: February 11, 1949 (age 77); Los Angeles, California, U.S.
- Occupations: Visual artist, author, educator and actor.

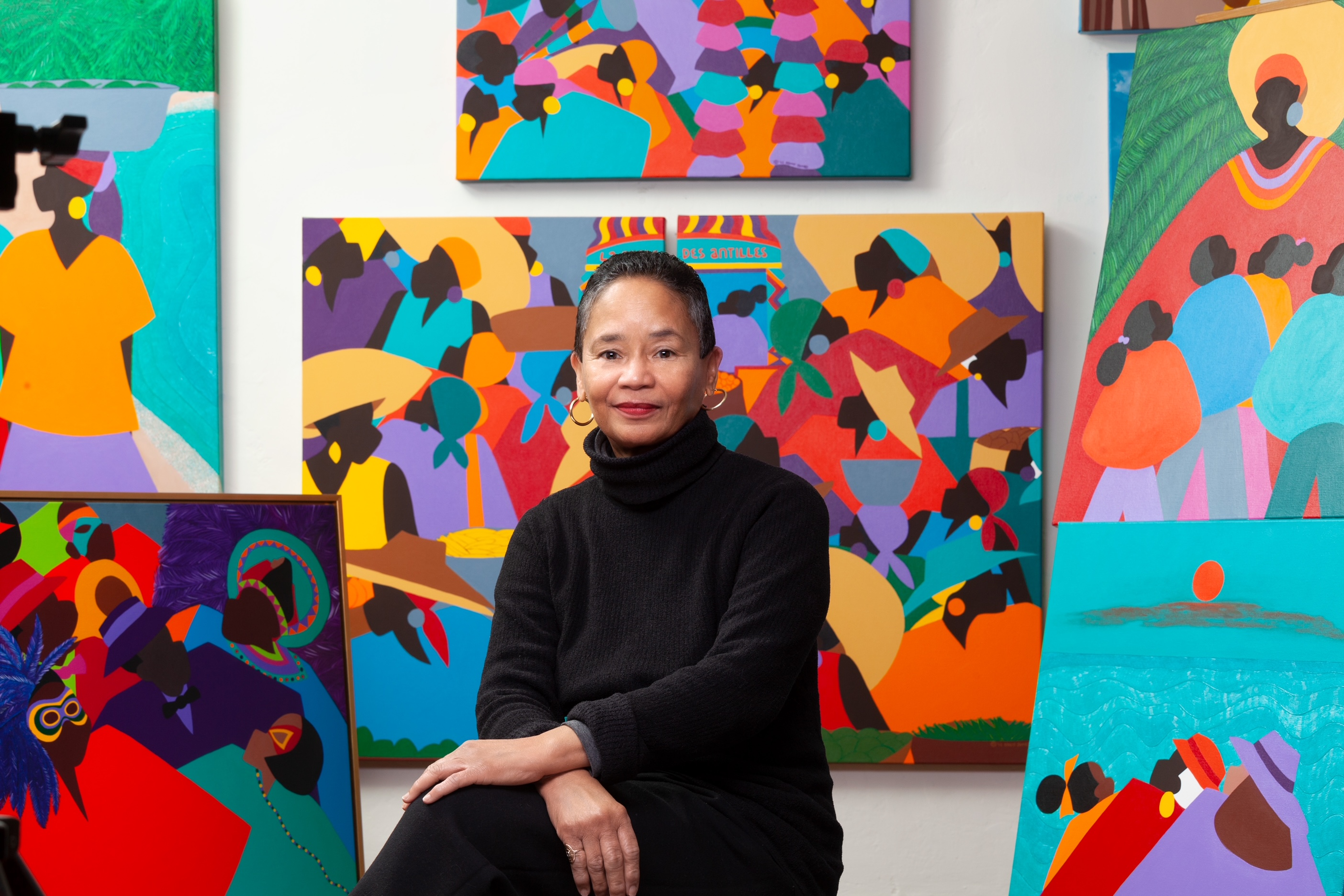
Saint James in her studio/gallery

Synthia Saint James (born February 11, 1949) is an American visual artist, author, keynote speaker, educator and actor. She is best known for designing the original cover art of the hardcover edition of Terry McMillan's book Waiting to Exhale. Additionally, Saint James designed the first Kwanzaa stamp for the United States Postal Service, first issued in 1997 and the Kwanzaa Forever Stamp, issued in 2016.

== Biography ==
Synthia Saint James was raised in Los Angeles, California and the Bronx, New York. She is a self- taught artist whose work includes fine art canvases, public murals, and book illustrations. She sold her first painting in New York City at the age of 20. She currently lives in Los Angeles.

== Career ==
In 1976, Saint James appeared in the film Emma Mae (also known as Black Sister's Revenge) as Ulika Stansell, cousin to the title-character Emma Mae. In 1977, Saint James appeared as the spokesperson and counter girl in a national McDonald's TV commercial.

Saint James had her first solo art exhibition at the Inner City Cultural Center in Los Angeles, California in 1977, where she studied performing arts. In 1980, she participated in her first international exhibition in Paris, France.

She received an honorary doctorate (Doctor of Humane Letters) from Saint Augustine's University, Raleigh, North Carolina, on May 8, 2010.

== Bibliography ==
=== Children's books ===
- Gershator/Saint James (1994). Tukama Tootles the Flute: A Tale From The Antilles Tukama Tootles the Flute: A Tale From The Antilles. Scholastic. ISBN 9780531086612.
- Chapman/Saint James (1994). Snow on Snow on Snow. Penguin. ISBN 9780803714571.
- Saint James, Synthia (1994). The Gifts of Kwanzaa. Whitman, Albert & Company. ISBN 9780807529072.
- Saint James, Synthia (1996). Sunday. Whitman, Albert & Company. ISBN 9780807576588.
- Myers/Saint James (1997). How Mr. Monkey Saw the Whole World. Random House. ISBN 9780440414155.
- Gershator/Saint James (2000). Greetings, Sun. DK/Penguin. ISBN 9780789426604.
- Barnwell/Saint James (2005). No Mirrors in My Nana's House. Houghton Mifflin Harcourt. ISBN 9780152052430.
- Williams/Saint James (1999). Girls Together. Houghton Mifflin Harcourt. ISBN 9780152309824.
- Hull/Saint James (1999). Happy Happy Kwanzaa. Brassheart Music; Pap/Cas edition. ISBN 978-0967376226.
- Nikola-Lisa/Saint James (2000). Hallelujah: A Christmas Celebration. Atheneum/Simon & Schuster; 1st edition. ISBN 978-0689816734.
- Mollel/Saint James (2000). To Dinner, for Dinner. Holiday House. ISBN 9780823415274.
- Hull/Saint James (2000). Alphabet Affirmations: Positive Affirmations for Children. Kids Creative Classics; Book and Cassette edition. ISBN 978-0967376233.
- Saint James, Synthia (2001). It's Kwanzaa Time It's Kwanzaa Time. Little Simon/Simon & Schuster. ISBN 9780689841637.
- Hull/Saint James (2002). Peace in Our Land. Kids Creative Classics. ISBN 978-0972147804.
- Hull/Saint James (2004). Dream A World: A Child's Journey To Self-Discovery. BrassHeart Music. ISBN 978-0972147835.
- Saint James, Synthia (2004). A story in The Milestones Project. Tricycle Press.
- English/Saint James (2003). Neeny Coming, Neeny Going. Troll Communications. ISBN 9780816737970.
- Sneve/Saint James (2003). Enduring Wisdom: Sayings from Native Americans. Holiday House. ISBN 978-0823414550.

=== Adult literature ===
- Johnson/Saint James (1996). Mother's Love. White Plains, NY: Peter Pauper Press.
- Saint James, Synthia (1996). Girlfriends. Peter Pauper Press. ISBN 978-0880882293.
- Saint James, Synthia (1997). Can I Touch You?: Love Poems and Affirmations. Beckham Publications. ISBN 978-1890207007.
- Saint James, Synthia (1998). Creative Fixings from the Kitchen: Favorite Multicultural Recipes. Persnickety Pr. ISBN 978-0965025843.
- Saint James, Synthia (2000). Who's Who among African Americans, 13th Edition, Forward. Gale/Thomson.
- Smiley, Tavis (2002). Essay in How to Make Black America Better: Leading African Americans Speak Out. Knopf/Random House. ISBN 9780385720878.
- Saint James, Synthia (2004). Synthia Saint James: a Book of Postcards. Pomegranate. ISBN 978-0764929472.
- Saint James, Synthia (2011). Living My Dream: an Artistic Approach to Marketing. CreateSpace Independent Publishing Platform. ISBN 9781466409897.
- Saint James, Synthia (2011). The I Wills According to SAINT JAMES: Book One. Atelier SAINT JAMES. ISBN 978-0615584683.
- Saint James, Synthia (2011). Can I Touch You: a Collection of Love Poetry. Atelier SAINT JAMES. ISBN 978-0615579313.
- Saint James, Synthia (2015). In and Out of Love: Selected Poetry from the 1970s. Atelier SAINT JAMES. ISBN 978-0692608029.
- Saint James, Synthia (2016). Creative Fixings from the Kitchen: Multicultural Delights. Atelier SAINT JAMES. ISBN 978-0692359839.
- Saint James, Synthia (2016). Honey Suckle Kisses. Atelier SAINT JAMES. ISBN 978-0692712320.
- Saint James, Synthia (2016). I AM EDMONIA LEWIS and I AM WILDFIRE (A Monologue). Atelier SAINT JAMES. ISBN 978-1539035848.
- Saint James, Synthia (2016). Honey Suckle Kisses: Love's Refreshment. Atelier SAINT JAMES. ISBN 978-1539014171.

== Awards ==
Year	Award	Organisation
2015	2015 Villager Award	Afram Global Organization Inc, The Village P.r.o.j.e.c.t.s.
2011	California Black Women's Health Project	
2010	Trumpet Awards-The Arts	Trumpet Awards
2010	Honorary Doctorate( Doctor of Humane Letters)	Saint Augustine's College
2010	Hall of Fame	National Association of Women Business Owners, Los Angeles Chapter
2010	"Phenomenal Women"	California State University, Northridge
2008	"Woman of the Year"	26th Senatorial District of California
2007	"A Tribute to Synthia SAINT JAMES"	The Home Depot Center Charitable Foundation & AEG Worldwide
2006	"MOSTE Inspirational Woman"	MOSTE Foundation
2006	"The Samella Award"	Center for the Arts of the African Diaspora
2004	"Woman of the Year" (Education)	Los Angeles County Commission for Women
2004	"The History Makers Award"	
2002	"Ebony Excellence: Women of Vision"	Mu Beta Omega chapter of Alpha Kappa Alpha sorority.
2002	"Sisters Award"	National Alumnae Association of Spelman College
2001	"Greensboro, NC Key to the City"	African American Atelier Gallery
2001	"The Arts Council Award"	California Afro-American Museum
2001	"Oppenheim Gold Award" - for the book To Dinner, For Dinner	
2000	"Literary & Visual Arts Award"	115th Anniversary Second Baptist Church
2000	"Talent Award"	Los Angeles Chapter of The Links, Inc.
1999	"NAPPA Gold Award"	NAPPA
1998	"Women of Vision Award"	Black Women Lawyers
1997	Coretta Scott King Illustrator Award - for the book Neeny Coming Neeny Going	
1997	"UNICEF Greeting Card Award"	UNICEF
1997	"AT&T Entrepreneur of the Year"	Black Women of Achievement & NAACP Legal Defense Fund
1997	"Treasure of Los Angeles"	
1997	"YWCA Silver Achievement Award"	YWCA
1996	"Parents Choice Silver Honor" - for the book Sunday	

=== 43rd NAACP Image Awards (2012) ===
"Living My Dream: An Artistic Approach to Marketing": Outstanding Literary Work-Instructional category.
