= Leon Isaac Kennedy =

American actor, screenwriter, producer, and former disc jockey

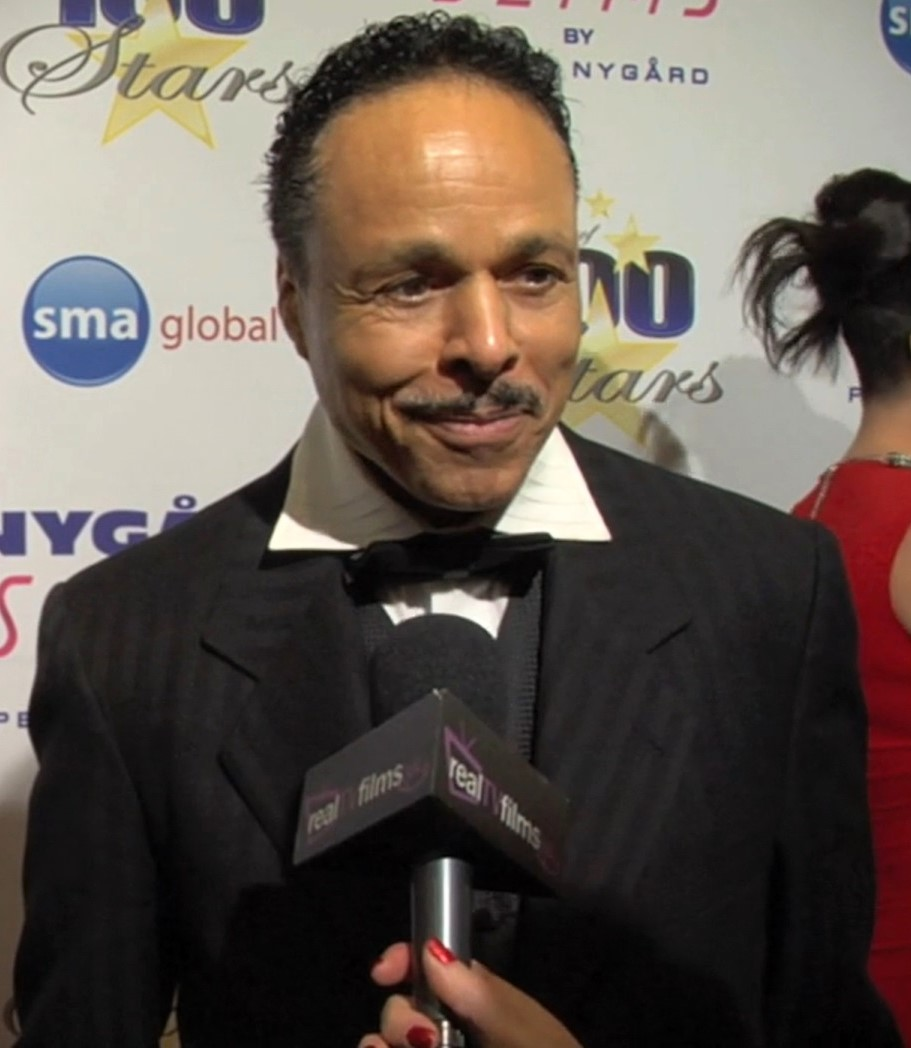
- Kennedy in 2015
- Born: New York City, New York, U.S.
- Occupations: Actor; screenwriter; film producer; television producer; radio personality
- Years active: 1960s–present
- Spouse(s): Jayne Kennedy (m. 1971; div. 1982) Lolita Armbrister (m. 1995) Maureen LaVette (m. 2005)

Leon Isaac Kennedy is an American actor, screenwriter, film and television producer, and former radio personality. He is known for portraying Martel "Too Sweet" Gordone in Penitentiary (1979), Penitentiary II (1982), and Penitentiary III (1987). His other film work includes writing and starring in Body and Soul (1981), portraying FBI agent Marcus Jackson in Lone Wolf McQuade (1983), and writing, producing, and appearing in Knights of the City (1986).

== Early life and radio career ==
Kennedy was born in New York City. He was raised in Cleveland, Ohio and began working as a disc jockey during his teenage years.

He subsequently moved to major radio markets, including working as a disc jockey in Detroit on WJLB. During his tenure at the R&B-formatted station in the late 1960s, local newspaper radio logs recorded his on-air shift under the pseudonym "Leon the Lover."

During his tenure in Detroit, Kennedy adopted the on-air persona "Leon The Lover" and hosted the program Leon's Lover's Lane. His broadcast style featured personally written poetry paired with contemporary rhythm and blues music. Media executive and Urban One founder Cathy Hughes noted that Kennedy's program contributed to the professional elevation of Black radio programming. While living in Washington, D.C., Kennedy attended Howard University, worked as a disc jockey at WOOK, and used the on-air name "Leon the Lover". He moved to Los Angeles in 1971 and continued working in radio and television.

== Television career ==
During his tenure in Detroit, Kennedy adopted the on-air persona "Leon The Lover" and hosted the program Leon's Lover's Lane. His broadcast style featured personally written poetry paired with contemporary rhythm and blues music. Media executive and Urban One founder Cathy Hughes noted that Kennedy's program contributed to the professional elevation of Black radio programming.

At age 19, Kennedy transitioned into television broadcasting by hosting "Teenarama Dance Party," Washington, D.C. (1968–1969) a youth-oriented musical variety and dance program patterned after American Bandstand.

Kennedy later co-wrote, co-produced, and co-hosted the syndicated variety program Outta Sight. After relocating to Los Angeles, he expanded into television writing and production and co-wrote and co-produced My Buddy, a television pilot starring Redd Foxx.

His other television credits include:

Year	Title	Role	Notes	Ref.
1973	The All American Boy		Television series	
1974	Get Christie Love!		Episode: "Get Christie Love!" (Pilot); credited as Leon Isaac	
1978	To Kill a Cop	Detective Abernathy	Television movie; credited as Leon Isaac	
1979	CHiPs	Officer Lenny Powell	Episodes: "Drive, Lady, Drive: Part 1" & "Part 2"	
1980	Off the Minnesota Strip	Louis Knox Jr.	Television movie	
1986	The Hitchhiker	The Duke	Episode: "Last Scene"	
1988	Sonny Spoon		Television series	
1991	Against the Law	Spider	Episode: "The Solid Gold Urn"	

== Film career ==
Kennedy began producing feature-length motion pictures in his mid-twenties. His production and acting credits include:

Year	Title	Role	Notes	Ref.
1972	Hammer		Film debut	
1976	Mean Johnny Barrows	Pvt. Pickens	Credited as Leon Isaac	
1977	Big Time		Also producer	
1978	Death Force	McGee	Also associate producer	
1979	Cheerleader's Wild Weekend	Joyful Jerome	Also known as The Great American Girl Robbery	
1979	Penitentiary	Martel "Too Sweet" Gordone		
1981	Body and Soul	Leon Michael Gordon	Also writer and producer	
1982	Penitentiary II	Martel "Too Sweet" Gordone	Also producer	
1983	Lone Wolf McQuade	FBI Agent Marcus Jackson		
1984	Too Scared to Scream	Frank		
1986	Hollywood Vice Squad	Hawkins		
1987	Penitentiary III	Martel "Too Sweet" Gordone		
1988	Skeleton Coast	Chuck		
2021	New York Ninja	Detective Jimmy Williams	Directed and filmed in 1984; re-constructed and released in 2021	

Kennedy starred as Martel "Too Sweet" Gordone in Penitentiary and served as an associate producer on the film. Director Jamaa Fanaka later described the film as a major independent commercial success that broke house records in several theaters. Kennedy reprised the role in Penitentiary II and Penitentiary III.

Kennedy wrote the screenplay for Body and Soul and starred as boxer Leon Johnson. The film also featured Jayne Kennedy, Peter Lawford, and Muhammad Ali as himself. The AFI Catalog states that Kennedy agreed to star in the film on the condition that he be permitted to write, produce, and cast Jayne Kennedy, and that the film was produced in association with Kennedy Productions. Film scholar Travis Vogan wrote that Cannon Films signed Kennedy to a three-picture agreement to act, write, and produce.

In 1983, Kennedy appeared with Chuck Norris and David Carradine in Lone Wolf McQuade, portraying FBI agent Marcus Jackson. He later wrote, produced, and appeared in Knights of the City and produced and starred in Penitentiary III. A 1987 Los Angeles Times profile discussed Kennedy's producing work on the Penitentiary films and his efforts to develop projects independently.

=== Later acting roles and ensembles ===
During the mid-to-late 1980s, Kennedy appeared in mainstream ensemble casts alongside several established Hollywood actors. In 1984, he co-starred as Detective Frank in the independent slasher film Too Scared to Scream, appearing alongside Mike Connors, Anne Archer, and Ian McShane.

In 1988, Kennedy portrayed the character Chuck in the international military action-war film Skeleton Coast. The production featured an ensemble cast that included Academy Award winner Ernest Borgnine, Robert Vaughn, Oliver Reed, and Herbert Lom.

== Recognition and influence ==
In a 2014 interview, filmmaker and actor Ice Cube identified Kennedy among earlier filmmakers whose work and struggles helped "crack the door open" for later generations.

=== Public profile and media coverage ===
During the late 1970s and 1980s, Kennedy appeared on the covers and in the pages of numerous entertainment and lifestyle magazines. Many of his high-profile media appearances during this era documented his marriage and professional partnership with actress and broadcaster Jayne Kennedy.His notable cover appearances in national periodicals include:Jet (September 7, 1978): Featured alongside Jayne Kennedy as a prominent Hollywood power couple promoting their collaborative projects. Jet (August 20, 1981): A joint cover addressing intense public speculation and media criticism regarding their careers and high-profile relationship. Jet (November 26, 1981): Featured alongside Jayne Kennedy discussing their joint business and media endeavors. Soul Magazine (March 26, 1979): Shared the cover of the Black entertainment tabloid with Jayne Kennedy for an issue spotlighting prominent young leaders in the entertainment industry. Ebony (January 1982): A highly publicized cover story detailing the transition and conclusion of his ten-year marriage to Jayne Kennedy. Playgirl (July 1982): A standalone cover feature focusing on Kennedy's individual star power following his lead role in the martial arts film Penitentiary II. Kennedy was also regularly featured in Playboy magazine's editorial highlights documenting cinema culture. He was profiled in the publication's "Sex In Cinema 1980" feature alongside contemporaries like John Travolta and Sylvester Stallone, and appeared with Jayne Kennedy in a multi-page pictorial spread titled "Body and Soulmates" in July 1981. His work was further cited in the magazine's late 1982 and early 1984 retrospectives.

=== Transition to ministry and community advocacy ===
Following his film career in the late 1980s, Kennedy transitioned away from commercial motion picture production to focus on community advocacy and Christian ministry. During this period, he worked as a public speaker, visiting juvenile detention centers, rehabilitation facilities, and community shelters. By the early 1990s, Kennedy became a licensed and ordained Christian evangelist and founded the Kennedy Healing Love Ministries (also known as the Ministry of Helps), traveling internationally to conduct religious services and spiritual programs.

As a producer of religious media, he partnered with evangelist Tim Storey to write and co-produce a series of documentaries celebrating the 100th anniversary of the Azusa Street Revival, a historical 1906 Pentecostal movement in downtown Los Angeles. Released in association with Gener8Xion Entertainment, the media package included Tragedy to Triumph: The William Seymour Story (hosted by Kenneth Copeland) and The Women of Azusa Street (hosted by Paula White).

== Personal life ==
On August 19, 2005, Kennedy married actress and producer Maureen LaVette. The couple has since collaborated as professional partners on various film and independent media production projects.
