= Penitentiary (1979 film) =

1979 film by Jamaa Fanaka

- Theatrical release poster
- Directed by: Jamaa Fanaka
- Written by: Jamaa Fanaka
- Produced by: Jamaa Fanaka; Alicia Dhanifu; Robert Edelen; Irving Parham
- Starring: Leon Isaac Kennedy; Wilbur White; Thommy Pollard; Hazel Spears; Donovan Womack
- Cinematography: Marty Ollstein
- Edited by: Betsy Blankett Millicevic
- Distributed by: The Jerry Gross Organization
- Release date: November 21, 1979
- Running time: 93 minutes
- Country: United States
- Language: English
- Budget: $100,000 (estimated)
- Box office: $4 million

Penitentiary is a 1979 American blaxploitation drama film written, produced and directed by Jamaa Fanaka, and starring Leon Isaac Kennedy as Martel "Too Sweet" Gordone, a man who deals with his wrongful imprisonment as a black youth. The film was released on November 21, 1979.

== Plot ==
Martel Gordone had been wandering aimlessly through the desert when he is finally picked up by an African-American woman driving a van dubbed the "Shaggin' Wagon". The woman, Linda, who picks him up is actually a prostitute on her way to some clients. On the way to the diner where the two parties are to meet, Linda and Gordone (nicknamed "Too Sweet" because of his uncontrollable addiction to Mr. Goodbar candy bars) spark an interest in each other, but Linda decides to wait until after she has finished with her clients, "You know, honey, it's got to be business before pleasure, and I'm sure you're a real pleasure". They reach the diner and Linda meets with her clients, but when Gordone does not like how she is being treated, he decides to confront the two for their ungentlemanly behavior. The confrontation does not bode well for Gordone, for after a little tussling he is knocked out and falls to the ground. He wakes up to find that he has been charged for the murder of one of the bikers whom he had confronted earlier.

Gordone is sent to jail and becomes cellmates with a man who goes by the nickname of "Half Dead". While in his cell, Gordone has to defend himself from constant advances from the brute. The two battle it out in the cell until the walls are covered with sweat and blood. The wailing and begging attracts a lot of attention from other inmates, who cheer for "Half Dead" to rape the newcomer, but in fact Gordone manages to subdue his assailant and rises triumphantly, telling everybody to "back off".

Gordone is then put in another cell, his new cellmate being an older man going by the nickname "Seldom Seen", who has been in this jail for 35 years (adding up to 50 years as he spent another 15 years in jail in his youth), and has developed his own personal wisdom, out of sheer survival concern, considering himself "the freest man in the world" for he learned how to control his desires and focus on his core self. Gordone and "Seldom Seen" develop a genuine friendship.

Shortly afterward, an illegal boxing tournament is organized in the prison, led by Lieutenant Arnsworth. The winner of the tournament will be allowed to leave the prison on early parole because Lieutenant Arnsworth can pull a few strings on the parole board, and Gordone feels as though he would be able to win it. The only thing that stands in his way is a man by the name of Jesse "The Bull" Amos, who is in charge of everything within the prison and is the leader of the prison's strongest gang. "Seldom Seen" agrees to be Gordone's trainer.

== Cast ==
- Leon Isaac Kennedy as Martel "Too Sweet" Gordone
- Wilbur White as "Sweet Pea"
- Thommy Pollard as Eugene T. "Genie" Lawson
- Hazel Spears as Linda
- Donovan Womack as Jesse "The Bull" Amos
- Floyd Chatman as Hezzikia "Seldom Seen" Jackson
- Gloria Delaney as "Peaches"
- Badja Djola as "Half Dead" Johnson
- Chuck Mitchell as Lieutenant Arnsworth
- Cepheus Jaxon as Poindexter
- Dwaine Fobbs as Latney "Lying Latney" Winborn
- Ernest Wilson as "Cheese"
- Will Richardson as "Magilla Gorilla"
- Tony Cox as T.C., The Money Maker

== Soundtrack ==
"Kissy Face" – written, produced and performed by Mark Gaillard and The Slim and Trim Band.

== Home media ==
Both the original film and its first sequel were released on DVD by Xenon Entertainment in 2000. Both films contain an audio commentary by writer/director Jamaa Fanaka and are currently out of print. They were subsequently re-released by Xenon on DVD in 2006. Both films were released on DVD and Blu-ray by Vinegar Syndrome in 2018.

ArrowDrome DVD re-released the film in February 2012 in the United Kingdom. The releases carry over the aforementioned commentary by Fanaka and include a collector's booklet.

== Sequels ==
Fanaka produced two sequels to the film over the ensuing decade.

The first sequel, Penitentiary II, was released in 1982. It was a direct sequel that followed the exploits of "Too Sweet" Gordone shortly after his release from prison. It was notable for the early casting of Mr. T as Gordone's trainer, Glynn Turman as his brother-in-law, and Ernie Hudson recast in the villainous role of "Half Dead". The film was released theatrically in the United States by MGM in April 1982 and grossed $3,178,542 at the box office.

The second sequel, Penitentiary III, was released in 1987. The plot centers on "Too Sweet" Gordone's time in prison, where he is sent after beating another boxer to death in a performance-enhancing drug-fueled fugue state. The film was released theatrically in the United States by The Cannon Group, Inc. in September 1987 and grossed $1,392,616 at the box office.

== See also ==
- List of boxing films
