= Situation Hopeless... But Not Serious =

1965 film by Gottfried Reinhardt

- Directed by: Gottfried Reinhardt
- Written by: Robert Shaw (novel); Jan Lustig; Silvia Reinhardt
- Produced by: Gottfried Reinhardt
- Starring: Alec Guinness; Mike Connors; Robert Redford; Paul Dahlke
- Cinematography: Kurt Hasse
- Edited by: Walter Boos
- Music by: Harold Byrne; Leon Carr
- Distributed by: Paramount Pictures
- Release date: October 13, 1965
- Running time: 97 minutes
- Country: United States
- Language: English

Situation Hopeless... But Not Serious is a 1965 oddball comedy film shot in black and white directed by Gottfried Reinhardt and starring Alec Guinness, Mike Connors and Robert Redford. It is based on the 1960 novel The Hiding Place by Robert Shaw.

The title is derived from Austrian-born columnist and theater critic Alfred Polgar's quip, "The situation is desperate, but not serious."

== Plot ==
On 27 November 1944, during World War II, two American fliers, Captain Hank Wilson and Sergeant Lucky Finder, have to bail out over Germany. They land in the small town of Altheim, where Wilhelm Frick reads his horoscope and it says an exciting change will happen that day.

In town, the fliers hide in Frick's cellar. He initially locks them in and is going to inform the authorities when one claims German descent and he softens. They sing German songs together. Frick decides to hide them from the authorities. He leaves them locked there and goes to his job as the pharmacist's assistant at Drogerie Neusel. His boss listens to the radio regarding the Allied advance: the Germans have lost Aachen ... the end of the war is close. American troops march through Altheim outside Frick's work.

The two Americans (Finder and Wilson) share the cellar with Frick's cats. They get hobbies: one sketching cartoons while the other does metalwork, which enables him to make a lockpick and they unlock themselves just as Frick returns. Finder has Frick's gun and turns it on him. They debate what will happen if they leave. He convinces them to stay. To ensure they stay, he puts them in shackles while they sleep. He tells them they must stay until the end of the war. He gives them the key to unlock themselves.

He brings them a very pretty little Christmas tree. The story then jumps to VE Day (May 1945) with Frick listening to the radio announcement regarding the end of the war.

The two have to reshackle themselves when Frick brings them food. On VE Day, he brings a large bottle of 10 year old Swiss kirsch and is about to tell them the news. By the third tumbler of kirsch, Frick is spilling as he pours and all are singing. Frick offers to give them cushions, books... and sunshine.

Frick's boss is arrested as a Nazi sympathiser. Finder grows a long beard. Outside, this part of Germany comes under American occupation. Frick tries to barter for extra supplies from the local American quartermaster.

In his struggle to keep them entertained, Frick lets slip some Americanisms and Finder queries how he knows them. Frick gives them a false history of the war and simply says that the Americans have captured Strasbourg. He gives them an orange stamped with the word California and they become suspicious. Struggling to explain, he distracts them by saying Paris is totally destroyed.

Finder demands a woman and Frick starts to search. He peers in the window of the Daffodil Club and gets invited inside. Inside, he meets Lissie, a madam, who offers him a choice of girls at the bar. He prefers to use her and starts to explain things to her. His conversation in her back office worries her so much that she presses her silent alarm and he gets thrown out.

Frick seems to go a bit crazy and is put in a hospital, but security is lax and he steals a bike and goes home. His house is dilapidated... it is unclear how long he has been gone. He unlocks the men. Two police appear outside (for the stolen bike). They ask if Switzerland is still neutral.

Finder steals Frick's luger pistol and runs off into the night. The police pursue him presuming he is a robber. In daylight, the two men end in an old ruined castle above a river. The police still pursue them. Frick appears and stops a shooting.

Next, the two Americans are hiding in large pipes. They find a scrap of newspaper discussing President Truman and the Iron Curtain.

The authorities investigate Frick's house and conclude he has had two people imprisoned.

The two men try to steal a small boat and are spotted by Wanda, the daughter of the owner. She presumes they have escaped from the American stockade. She invites them in for a "crazy time". They pay $750 to be taken over the Rhine and offer $1000 for a telephone. A boat of SS troops appears - but they are making a movie. They start to realise things are not as they think. A fist fight starts and spreads through the crowd.

The game is up and the two fly back to San Francisco. It is Christmas and they are in a bar getting drunk. Frick appears at the window. Frick ends serving drinks at their party.

== Cast ==
- Alec Guinness as Wilhelm Frick
- Mike Connors as Sgt. Lucky Finder
- Robert Redford as Captain Hank Wilson
- Paul Dahlke as Herr Neusel
- Frank Wolff as Randall the Quartermaster Sergeant
- Anita Höfer as Edeltraud
- Mady Rahl as Lissie
- Elisabeth von Molo as Wanda
- John Briley as Sergeant (uncredited)
- Carola Regnier as Senta (uncredited)

== See also ==
- List of American films of 1965
- Wake Me When the War Is Over, a 1969 TV film with a similar plot
