= One in a Million: The Ron LeFlore Story =

- Also known as: Man of Passion
- Genre: Action; Biography; Crime
- Based on: Breakout: From Prison to the Big Leagues by Ron LeFlore
- Written by: Stanford Whitmore
- Directed by: William A. Graham
- Starring: LeVar Burton; Madge Sinclair; Paul Benjamin
- Music by: Peter Matz
- Country of origin: United States
- Original language: English

Production
- Executive producers: Tony Converse; Roger Gimbel
- Producer: William S. Gilmore
- Production locations: Clinton, Iowa; Detroit; Chicago; Toledo, Ohio
- Cinematography: Jordan Cronenweth
- Editor: Aaron Stell
- Running time: 100 minutes
- Production company: EMI Films

Original release
- Network: CBS
- Release: September 26, 1978

One in a Million: The Ron LeFlore Story (also known as Man of Passion) is a 1978 American made-for-television biographical sports drama film telling the story of Ron LeFlore, a troubled Detroit youth who rose from Michigan prisons to star in Major League Baseball with the Detroit Tigers. The film was based on LeFlore's autobiography, Breakout: From Prison to the Big Leagues.

== Plot ==
Ron LeFlore battles a heroin addiction which leads to doing time in Michigan's Jackson State Penitentiary. He is discovered in prison by Billy Martin, who was then the manager of the Detroit Tigers, and makes his way into playing in the major leagues.

== Cast ==
- LeVar Burton as Ron LeFlore
- Madge Sinclair as Georgia LeFlore
- Paul Benjamin as John LeFlore
- James Luisi as Jimmy Karalla
- Billy Martin as Himself
- Zakes Mokae as Pee Wee Spencer
- Larry B. Scott as Gerald LeFlore
- Anthony Mockus Sr. as Board Chairman

Former Tiger players Norm Cash, Bill Freehan, Al Kaline, and Jim Northrup also appeared as themselves.

== Release ==
The film first aired on CBS on September 26, 1978 and was released theatrically in Europe.

== See also ==
- List of baseball films
