= I Know Why the Caged Bird Sings (film) =

1979 television film directed by Fielder Cook

- VHS Cover
- Genre: Biography; Drama
- Written by: Maya Angelou
- Directed by: Fielder Cook
- Starring: Constance Good; Esther Rolle
- Music by: Peter Matz
- Country of origin: United States
- Original language: English

Production
- Executive producer: Thomas W. Moore
- Producer: Jean Moore Edwards
- Cinematography: Ralph Woolsey
- Editor: Frank J. Urioste
- Running time: 96 minutes
- Production company: Tomorrow Entertainment

Original release
- Network: CBS
- Release: April 28, 1979

I Know Why the Caged Bird Sings is an American television film based on the autobiography of the same name by Maya Angelou, first aired April 28, 1979, on CBS. Angelou and Leonora Thuna wrote the screenplay, and the movie was directed by Fielder Cook. Constance Good played the young Maya Angelou. Also appearing were Esther Rolle, Roger E. Mosley, Diahann Carroll, Ruby Dee, and Madge Sinclair. Filming took place in Vicksburg, Mississippi.

The movie traces Maya's life from when she and her brother move in with their grandmother to the trauma of being raped as a young girl by one of her mother's boyfriends and the several years of silence that came after the attack.

Two scenes in the movie differed from events described in the book. Angelou added a scene between Maya and Uncle Willie after the Joe Louis fight. In it, he expresses his feelings of redemption after Louis defeats a white opponent. Angelou also presents her eighth-grade graduation differently in the film. In the book, Henry Reed delivers the valedictory speech and leads the black audience in the Negro national anthem. In the movie, Maya conducts these activities.

== Cast ==
(in credits order)

- Paul Benjamin as Freeman
- Diahann Carroll as Vivian
- Ruby Dee as Grandmother Baxter
- Roger E. Mosley as Bailey Sr.
- Esther Rolle as Momma
- Madge Sinclair as Miss Flowers
- Constance Good as Maya Angelou
- John Driver as Bailey Jr. (as John M. Driver II)
- Sonny Jim Gaines as Uncle Willie
- Art Evans as Principal
- J. Don Ferguson as Mr. Donleavy
- Georgia Allen as Mrs. Gurney
- Darryl Antony Williams as Tommy Valdon (as Darryl Williams)
- Tonea Stewart as Lillie (as Tommie Stewart)
- Monica Kyles as Julie
- Rick Salassi as Parmenian (as Richard Salassi)
- Lewis Liddell as Tommy
- Sammy Liddell as Ira
- Sylvester Spann as Tutti
- Myra Jo Arvin as Red
- Mose Lee Williams as 1st Mrs. Fletcher
- Frankie Mitchell as 2nd Mrs. Fletcher
- M.L. Breeland as Mr. Peters
- Angela Brown as Kitty
- Abbie Burns as Mary
