= Tonea Stewart =

American actress

Dr Tonea Stewart
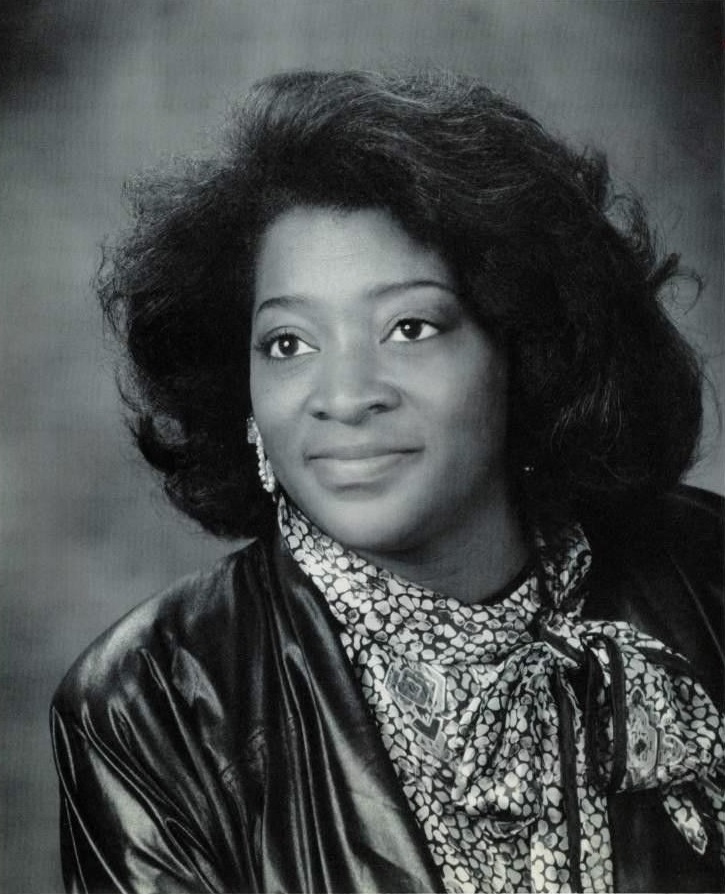
- Stewart in 1993
- Born: February 3, 1947 (age 79); Greenwood, Mississippi, U.S.
- Other name: Tommie Stewart
- Education: Jackson State University; University of California, Santa Barbara; Florida State University
- Occupation: Actress/professor
- Years active: 1976–present
- Employer: Alabama State University
- Television: In the Heat of the Night
- Parent(s): Hattie Juanita and Thomas Harris

Tonea Stewart (born February 3, 1947), also Tommie Stewart, is an American actress and university professor. She is the former dean of the College of Visual and Performing Arts of Alabama State University in Montgomery, Alabama.

She had a recurring role as Aunt Etta Kibby in the American television series In the Heat of the Night, and is an NAACP Image Award nominee for acting in film A Time to Kill.

From the beginning of her acting career until 2019, Stewart concurrently worked as an actress and educator; she did not act full time until her retirement from teaching.

== Early life and education ==
Stewart was born in Greenwood, Mississippi, the daughter of Hattie (née Leonard) and Thomas Harris. Her father worked as an electrician and plumber, while Stewart's mother was an educator. They would divorce when Stewart was 4 years old. Her sister, Beverly Branson, is a singer, and the two have performed together on stage.

Her original intention was to become a doctor, and she studied biology at Jackson State University. However, after acting in a school production, Stewart changed her major to theater. She earned a BS degree in speech and theater at Jackson, and then studied theater at the University of California at Santa Barbara. In 1989, Stewart received a PhD in theater arts from Florida State University.

== Acting career ==
Stewart's first performance on screen was in TV movie Nightmare in Badham County (1976). She appeared as Mrs. Walker in film Mississippi Burning (1988). From 1991 to 1993, Stewart played Aunt Etta Kibby on In the Heat of the Night. On the series, she had previously portrayed a different character, and returned under this new role as producers were impressed with her performance. Stewart acted in the feature films Body Snatchers, Livin' Large, Mississippi Damned and Girls Trip.

She has made guest appearances on television series Matlock, Walker, Texas Ranger, ER and Touched by an Angel. She played Gwen Hailey, the wife of Samuel L. Jackson's character, in A Time to Kill (1996). Stewart received an NAACP Image Award nomination for her work in this film. In Come Sunday (2018), she portrayed the mother of Pentecostal bishop Carlton Pearson.

The majority of Stewart's work has been in television films. She acted in I Know Why the Caged Bird Sings, Don't Look Back: The Story of Leroy 'Satchel' Paige (portraying the mother of Satchel Paige) and The Rosa Parks Story, where she appeared as Johnnie Carr. In 1994, Stewart appeared in the TV movies One Christmas as Evangeline and A Passion for Justice: The Hazel Brannon Smith Story as Henrietta. She portrayed Memaw, the grandmother of Halle Downing, in the Oprah Winfrey Network movie First Christmas.

== Teaching career ==
Stewart began teaching in 1971, educating high school students. At her alma mater, Jackson State University, she taught speech to her students. By 1983, Stewart was assistant professor for the dramatics and speech departments at Jackson.

Starting in 1990, she was a professor at the College of Visual and Performing Arts for Alabama State University, also chairing the theater department. Stewart eventually became dean before retiring in 2019 after 48 years in education. One of her students was Stephen Boss.

In 2020, Stewart was appointed by Alabama state governor Kay Ivey to represent the fifth district of the Alabama State Board of Education.

== Personal life ==
She is married to Allen Stewart, with whom she has three children.

== Filmography ==
=== Television ===
Guest Starring Roles

- Walker, Texas Ranger "Rise to the Occasion" (1999) as Principal Rivers
- Walker, Texas Ranger "The Trial of LaRue" (1997) as Judge Loretta Paxton
- Memphis Beat "I Want to be Free" as Miss Angelina
- Matlock "The Juror" (1993) as Henrietta Dorsey
- In the Heat of the Night (198?) as Ms. Gray in Season 2 episode "Prisoners" as Ms. Gray, the mother of slain prison victim, Eric Gray.
- American Horror Story: Coven (2013) as Cora

Starring Roles

- In the Heat of the Night (1988) as Aunt Etta (Virgil's widowed maternal aunt Etta Kibbee. She resides with Virgil and Althea Tibbs and is caretaker of their twins, William Calvin and Sarah Ruth. (Seasons 4–7) Prior to her role as Kibbee, Stewart also appeared on the Season 2 episode "Prisoners" as Ms. Gray, the mother of slain prison victim, Eric Gray.

=== Film ===
- Same Kind of Different as Me (2017) as Big Mama
- Girls Trip (2017) as Aunt Marian
- The Hollars (2015) as Latisha
- Mississippi Damned (2009) as Alice
- A Time to Kill (1996) as Gwen Hailey
- Body Snatchers (1993) as teacher
- Mississippi Burning (1988) as Mrs. Walker
- I Know Why the Caged Bird Sings (1979) as Lillie (credited as Tommie Stewart)
- Roll of Thunder, Hear My Cry (1978) as Mrs. Avery (credited as Tommie Stewart)
- Nightmare in Badham County (1976) – Alma (credited as Tommie Stewart)
