= Body and Soul (1981 film) =

1981 film by George Bowers

- Directed by: George Bowers
- Written by: Leon Isaac Kennedy
- Produced by: Yoram Globus; Menahem Golan
- Starring: Leon Isaac Kennedy
- Cinematography: James Forrest
- Edited by: Samuel D. Pollard; Skip Schoolnik
- Music by: Webster Lewis
- Distributed by: Cannon Film Distributors
- Release date: October 9, 1981
- Running time: 109 minutes
- Country: United States
- Language: English
- Budget: $2 million
- Box office: $1.4 million

Body and Soul is a 1981 American sports drama film written by and starring Leon Isaac Kennedy and co-starring Jayne Kennedy. Directed by George Bowers, it is a remake of the 1947 film of the same name.

== Plot ==
Leon Johnson (Leon Isaac Kennedy) is a boxer who plans to study medicine, but, with his ailing sister, Kelly (Nikki Swasey), in need of costly care, he decides to earn a living in the ring. His rise is rapid, but Leon's newly extravagant lifestyle threatens his relationship with girlfriend Julie (Jayne Kennedy). As Leon approaches the sport's highest echelons, he faces increasingly tough decisions that test his loyalty to his family and himself.

== Cast ==
- Leon Isaac Kennedy as Leon Johnson
- Jayne Kennedy as Julie Winters
- Perry Lang as Charles Golphin
- Nikki Swasey as Kelly Johnson
- Michael V. Gazzo as Frankie
- Kim Hamilton as Mrs. Johnson
- Muhammad Ali as himself
- Peter Lawford as Big Man
- Gilbert Lewis as Tony
- J.B. Williamson as St. Louis assassin
- Mel Welles as Joe Gillardi
- Danny Wells as sports announcer #1
- Johnny Brown as sports announcer #2
- Rosanne Katon as Melody
- Eddie Mustafa Muhammad as himself
- Jimmy Lennon as himself

== See also ==
- List of boxing films
