= Mike Connors =

American actor (1925–2017)

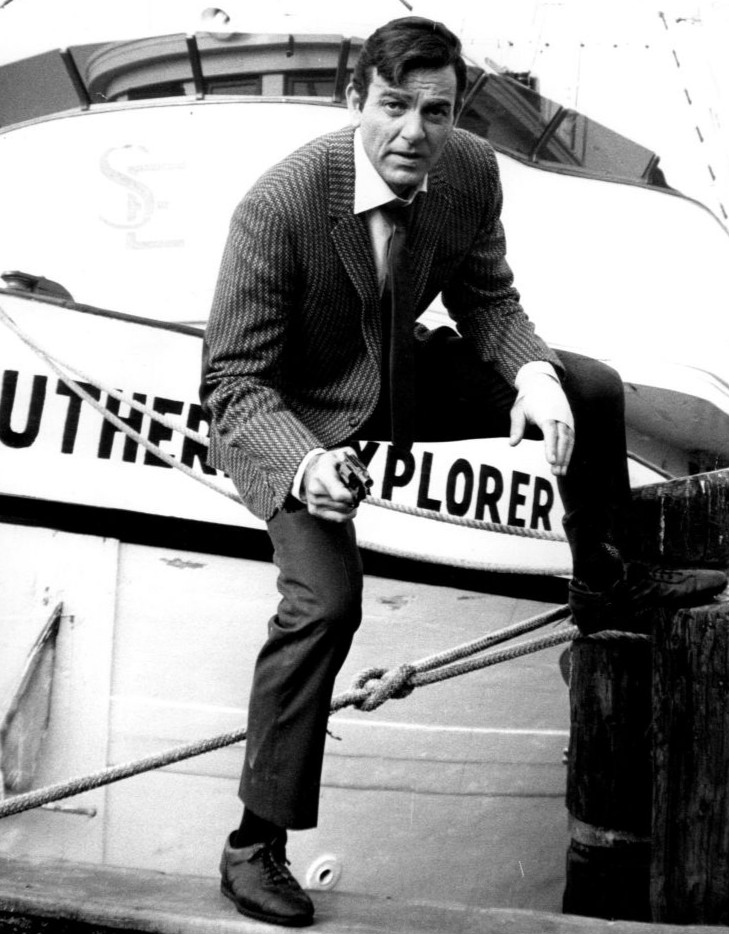
- Connors as Joe Mannix, 1968
- Born: Krekor Ohanian; August 15, 1925; Fresno, California, U.S.
- Died: January 26, 2017 (aged 91); Tarzana, California, U.S.
- Other name: Touch Connors
- Education: University of California, Los Angeles
- Occupations: Actor; film producer
- Years active: 1952–2007
- Political party: Republican
- Spouse: Mary Lou Willey (m. 1949)
- Children: 2
- Relatives: Charles Aznavour (cousin)

Krekor Ohanian (August 15, 1925 – January 26, 2017), known professionally as Mike Connors, was an American actor and film producer. He was best known for playing private detective Joe Mannix on the CBS television series Mannix from 1967 to 1975. This role earned him a Golden Globe Award in 1970, the first of six straight nominations, as well as four consecutive Primetime Emmy nominations from 1970 to 1973. He also starred in the short-lived series Tightrope! (1959–1960) and Today's FBI (1981–1982).

Connors's acting career spanned 56 years. In addition to his work on television, he appeared in numerous films, including Sudden Fear (1952), Good Neighbor Sam (1964), Situation Hopeless... But Not Serious (1965), Stagecoach (1966), Kiss the Girls and Make Them Die (1966) and Too Scared to Scream (1985), which he also produced.

== Early life ==
Connors was born Krekor Ohanian Jr. on August 15, 1925, in Fresno, California, to Armenian parents Krekor and Alice (née Surabian) Ohanian. His father had escaped the Armenian genocide. They married in 1915 and had six children: Paul I (died in childhood), Paul II, Dorothy M., Arpesri A., Krekor and Eugene. His father was an attorney and represented many Armenians who had little money and could not speak English. Connors spoke three languages: Armenian, English, and French. Connors was a cousin of French-Armenian singer Charles Aznavour.

Connors was an avid basketball player in high school, nicknamed "Touch" by his teammates. During World War II, he served as an enlisted man in the United States Army Air Forces. After the war, he attended the University of California at Los Angeles on both a basketball scholarship and the G.I. Bill, where he played under coach John Wooden. Connors went to law school, where he studied to become an attorney, taking after his father. He was a member of the Phi Delta Theta fraternity.

After a basketball game, coach Wilbur Johns introduced Connors to his friend, director William A. Wellman, who liked Connors' voice and expressive face while he was playing basketball, and encouraged him to consider acting. He was considered for the role of Tarzan by casting director Ruth Burch, who found him an acting coach.

After Connors became an actor, his agent Henry Willson thought the name "Ohanian" was too similar to the actor George O'Hanlon and gave him the stage name "Touch Connors" based on his basketball nickname. Willson considered "Connors" to be a "good all-American name." Connors later stated he hated the name "from day one" and considered not using his real name the only big regret of his career. After getting the starring role in Tightrope!, Connors wanted to be credited as Ohanian, but Columbia Pictures told him that he had already done too much work as Connors, though he was allowed to change his first name to Mike.

== Career ==
=== Early roles ===
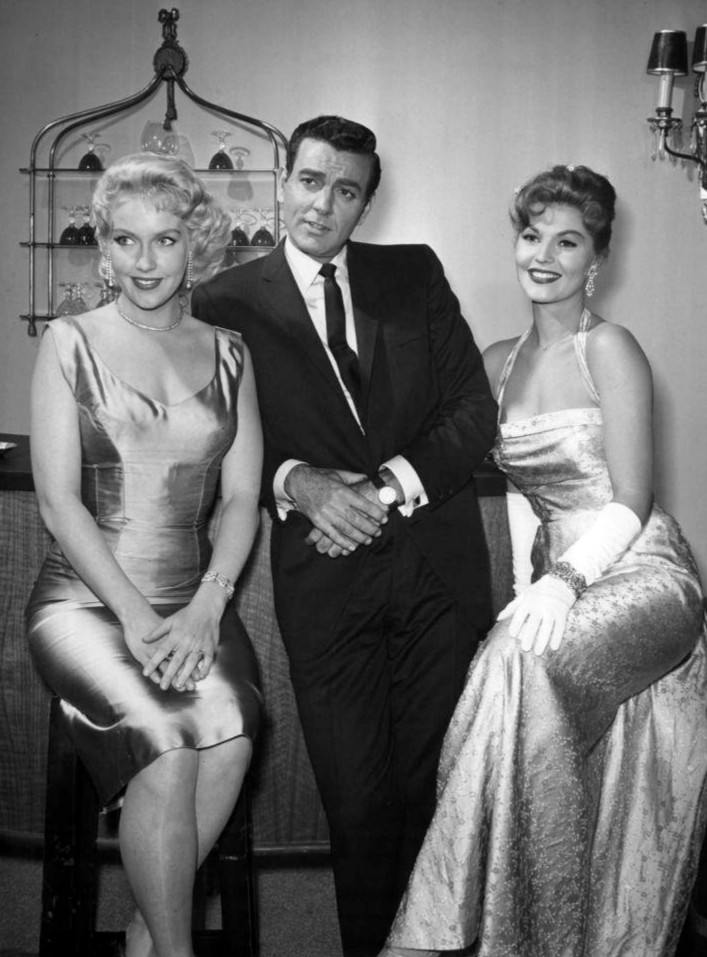
Connors with Leigh Snowden (left) and Claire Kelly in a publicity photo for Tightrope!, 1960

Connors's film career started in the early 1950s, when he made his acting debut in a supporting role opposite Joan Crawford and Jack Palance in the thriller Sudden Fear (1952). He had initially been rejected for an audition by producer Joseph Kaufman due to his lack of experience, but after sneaking into Republic Pictures and meeting director David Miller, Connors was given a chance to read the script and was offered the part.

Connors was cast in the John Wayne film Island in the Sky, in which he played a crewman on one of the search-and-rescue planes. In 1956, he played an Amalekite herder in Cecil B. DeMille's The Ten Commandments.

Connors appeared in numerous television series, including the co-starring role in the 1955 episode "Tomas and the Widow" of the anthology series Frontier. He guest-starred on the early sitcoms Hey, Jeannie! and The People's Choice, and in two Rod Cameron syndicated crime dramas, City Detective and the Western-themed State Trooper, and played the villain in the first episode filmed (but second aired) of ABC's smash hit Maverick, opposite James Garner in 1957.

Connors had roles in several of the earliest films Roger Corman directed: Five Guns West (1955), The Day the World Ended (1955), Swamp Women (1956) and The Oklahoma Woman (1956). Connors starred in and was the executive producer of Flesh and the Spur (1956). He raised $117,000 for the film.

In 1958, Connors appeared in the title role of the episode "Simon Pitt", the series finale of the NBC Western Jefferson Drum, starring Jeff Richards as a frontier newspaper editor. He appeared in another NBC Western series, The Californians. That same year, Connors was cast as Miles Borden, a corrupt US Army lieutenant bitter over his $54 monthly pay on NBC's Wagon Train in the episode "The Dora Gray Story" with Linda Darnell in the title role. About this time, he also appeared on an episode of NBC's Western series Cimarron City.

Other syndicated series in which he appeared were The Silent Service, based on true stories of the submarine section of the United States Navy; Sheriff of Cochise, a Western series; Whirlybirds, an aviation adventure series; and Rescue 8, based on stories of the Los Angeles County Fire Department. An episode of Studio 57 starring Connors and titled "Getaway Car" was proposed as a pilot for a series about the CHP to be called Motorcycle Cop.

Connors starred as an undercover police officer who infiltrated organized crime in Tightrope! (1959–1960). Despite the show's popularity, it was canceled after only one season. Connors stated in an interview that the show's primary sponsor, J.B. Williams, refused CBS president James Aubrey's request to move it to a later time slot on a different day. The sponsor dropped Tightrope! and underwrote another program on another network. Connors also did not agree with the suggested change to add a sidekick, to be played by Don Sullivan. He thought the program would lose the suspense element, "Because the whole premise was this guy, all by himself, 'on a tightrope.' ... When he gets a sidekick, it loses the threat and the danger, and the whole premise is in the toilet."

Later, he was cast in the episode "The Aerialist" of the anthology series, Alcoa Presents: One Step Beyond. In 1963, he guest-starred as Jack Marson in the episode "Shadow of the Cougar" on the NBC modern Western series, Redigo, starring Richard Egan. In 1964, Connors appeared in a pinch-hit role for Raymond Burr as attorney Joe Kelly in the Perry Mason episode, "The Case of the Bullied Bowler". Connors was invited to take on a lead role in the series on an ongoing basis, but the producers had actually wanted to pressure Burr into resigning his contract with the series.

In 1964, Connors had a role in the Jack Lemmon comedy Good Neighbor Sam, and was the leading man to Susan Hayward and Bette Davis in Where Love Has Gone. He co-starred with Robert Redford in one of his earliest film roles, the World War II black comedy Situation Hopeless... But Not Serious (1965), in which Connors and Redford played American soldiers taken prisoner by a German villager played by Alec Guinness. Connors played the card sharp in the remake of Stagecoach (1966).

Connors was strongly considered to play Matt Helm in The Silencers (1966), but that role eventually went to Dean Martin. However, his audition had impressed Columbia Pictures, so Connors was instead cast in the similar James Bond spoof film Kiss the Girls and Make Them Die (1966). Connors himself performed the stuntwork of dangling from a rope ladder attached to a helicopter flying off the Christ the Redeemer statue in Rio de Janeiro when the local stuntman refused to do it.

=== Mannix ===
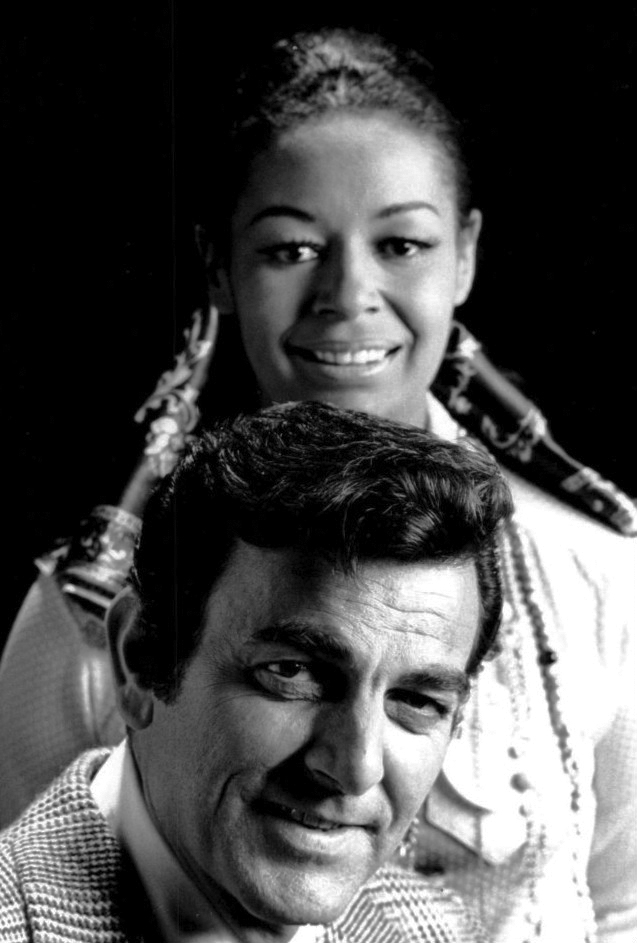
Connors with Gail Fisher in a publicity photo for Mannix, 1970

Connors became best known for playing the private investigator Joe Mannix in the detective series Mannix. The series ran for eight seasons from 1967 to 1975. During the first season of the series, Joe Mannix worked for Intertect, a large Los Angeles detective agency run by his superior Lew Wickersham (Joseph Campanella). From the second season onward, Mannix opened his own detective agency and is assisted by his secretary Peggy Fair (Gail Fisher).

Mannix was originally produced by Desilu Productions (later absorbed by Paramount Television). Then-president Lucille Ball pushed for CBS to keep the show on the air by removing the high-tech computers and making Mannix an independent detective. This move enabled the show to become a long-running hit for the network. Connors performed his own stunts on the series. During the filming of the pilot episode, he broke his wrist and dislocated his shoulder.

Joe Mannix was an Armenian American, like Connors. He spoke Armenian in a number of episodes and often quoted Armenian proverbs.

In 1970, Connors won the Golden Globe Award for Best Actor in a Television Series Drama. He was nominated for the Golden Globe Award six times from 1970 to 1975 and was nominated for the Primetime Emmy Award for Outstanding Lead Actor in a Drama Series four times from 1970 to 1973.

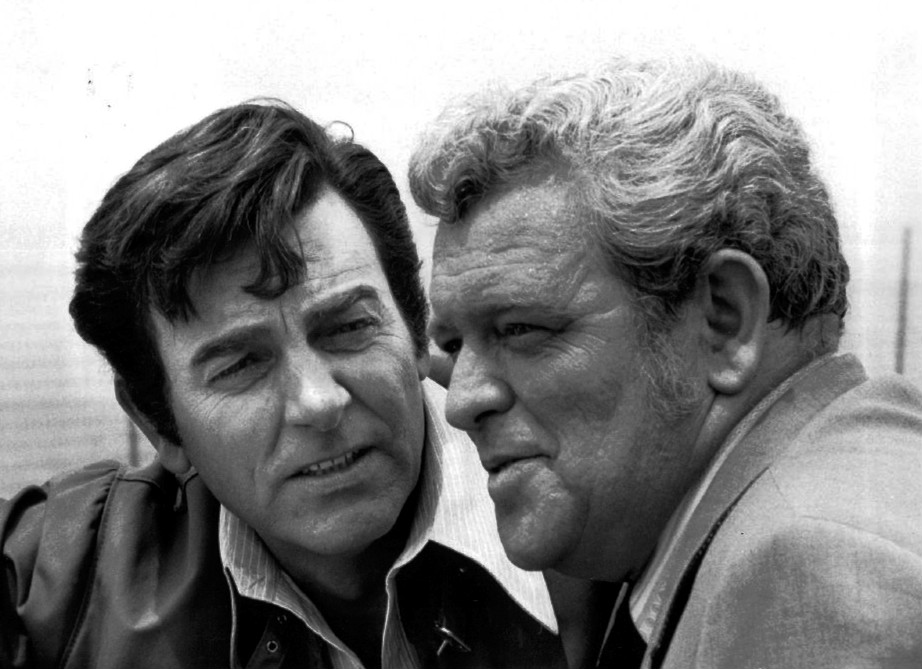
Connors with Eddie Egan in a publicity photo for Mannix, 1972

When discussing the success of the series in an interview, Connors stated: "The show itself started a whole new era of detective shows, because this wasn't the usual cynical private eye à la Humphrey Bogart. It was more a show about an all-round normal human being. The character of Joe Mannix could be taken advantage of by a pretty face, he could shed a tear on an emotional level, he was very close to his father and his family, so he was more a normal personality with normal behavior."

Connors was able to work with his boss Lucille Ball on-screen during a cross-promotion episode of her Here's Lucy series in 1971. The episode, which opened Lucy's fourth season, is titled "Lucy and Mannix are Held Hostage". This was notable as the first episode shot at Universal Studios, after Ball ceased producing her program at Paramount Studios.

Mannix remained a hit show through its final season. The show was taken off the air due to a dispute between CBS and Paramount. Paramount had sold the rights to air Mannix reruns to rival network ABC without informing CBS. When CBS discovered the deal, the executives quickly decided to cancel Mannix to avoid losing viewership for new episodes to the reruns.

He later reprised the role of Joe Mannix in a 1997 episode of Diagnosis: Murder and in the 2003 comedy film Nobody Knows Anything!

=== Later career ===
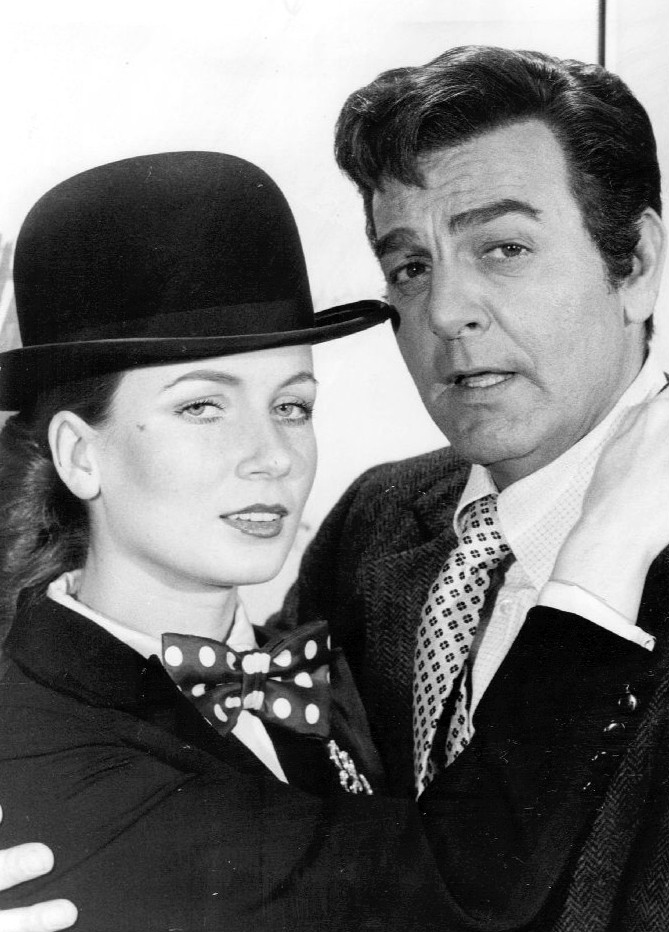
Connors with Genevieve Gilles in a publicity photo for Mannix, 1973

He narrated J. Michael Hagopian's 1975 documentary film The Forgotten Genocide, one of the first full-length features on the Armenian genocide. The documentary was nominated for two Emmys. In 1995, Connors narrated another Armenian documentary by Hagopian, Ararat Beckons.

In 1976, Connors played Karl Ohanian in the television film The Killer Who Wouldn't Die. Producers and writers Ivan Goff and Ben Roberts, who were also producers for Mannix, wanted the character to have Connors' real last name. The film was intended to be the pilot for a new ABC series titled Ohanian, about an Armenian-American former homicide detective who is now a charter-boat skipper. However, the series was not picked up.

Connors had roles in the thriller films Avalanche Express (1979) and Nightkill (1980). He starred as a bureau veteran who mentors a team of agents in Today's FBI (1981–1982). The series only lasted one season. Connors both starred in and produced the independent horror film Too Scared to Scream (1985).

He played Colonel Harrison "Hack" Peters in the 1988 miniseries War and Remembrance. Connors hosted the 1989 series Crimes of the Century. He voiced the character Chipacles in the Disney animated series Hercules from 1998 to 1999.

Connors' final appearance was in a 2007 Two and a Half Men episode, as a love interest of Evelyn Harper's (Holland Taylor).

== Personal life ==
Connors married Mary Lou Willey on September 10, 1949, when they were both UCLA students. They had two children, a son, Matthew Gunnar Ohanian, and a daughter, Dana Lee Connors. Matthew was diagnosed with schizophrenia at age 15. Matthew predeceased his father, dying of heart failure in 2007. Through his daughter Dana, he had one granddaughter.

After his son's diagnosis, Connors became active in charitable organizations for patients diagnosed with mental disorders. He was a spokesperson for the National Alliance on Mental Illness. In 1998, the University of California, Irvine School of Medicine's Brain Imaging Center Committee awarded Connors the Silver Ribbon Award for his contributions.

Connors made a public service announcement for the Armenian Eye Care Project.

Connors was a Republican. He endorsed Ronald Reagan for President in 1980 and 1984 and endorsed George Deukmejian for Governor of California in 1982 and 1986.

== Death ==
Connors died in Tarzana, California, at age 91 on January 26, 2017, a week after being diagnosed with leukemia.

== Filmography ==
=== Film ===
Year	Title	Role	Notes
1952	Sudden Fear	Junior Kearney	
1953	The 49th Man	Lt. Magrew	
1953	Sky Commando	Lt. Hobson Lee	
1953	Island in the Sky	Gainer	
1954	Day of Triumph	Andrew	
1955	Five Guns West	Hale Clinton	
1955	The Twinkle in God's Eye	Lou	
1955	Day the World Ended	Tony Lamont	
1956	Jaguar	Marty Lang	
1956	Swamp Women	Bob Matthews	
1956	The Oklahoma Woman	Tom Blake	
1956	Flesh and the Spur	Stacy Doggett	Also executive producer
1956	The Ten Commandments	Amalekite Herder	Credited as 'Touch Connors'
1956	Shake, Rattle & Rock!	Garry Nelson	
1957	Voodoo Woman	Ted Bronson	
1958	Suicide Battalion	Major Matt McCormack	
1958	Live Fast, Die Young	Rick	
1960	The Dalton That Got Away	Russ Dalton	
1964	Panic Button	Frank Pagano	
1964	Good Neighbor Sam	Howard Ebbets	
1964	Where Love Has Gone	Major Luke Miller	
1965	Harlow	Jack Harrison	
1965	Situation Hopeless... But Not Serious	Sgt. Lucky Finder	
1966	Stagecoach	Hatfield	
1966	Kiss the Girls and Make Them Die	Kelly	
1979	Avalanche Express	Haller	
1980	Nightkill	Wendell Atwell	
1985	Too Scared to Scream	Lt. Alex Dinardo	Also producer
1989	Fist Fighter	Billy Vance	
1993	Public Enemy #2	Himself	
1994	William Saroyan: The Man, the Writer	Narrator (voice)	
1994	Downtown Heat	Steve	
1997	James Dean: Race with Destiny	Jack Warner	
1998	Gideon	Harland Greer	
2000	The Extreme Adventures of Super Dave	Grandpa Osborne	Uncredited
2003	Nobody Knows Anything!	Joe Mannix	

=== Television ===
Year	Title	Role	Notes
1954	The Ford Television Theatre	Christopher Ames	Episode: "Yours for a Dream"
1954	Mr. & Mrs. North	Mark Willard	Episode: "Murder for Sale"
1955	City Detective	Massey	Episode: "Baby in the Basket"
1955	The Lineup		Episode: "The Messenger Case"
1955	Frontier	Tomas	Episode: "Tomas and the Widow"
1955	Schlitz Playhouse of Stars	Mel Dunlap / Lou Renaldi	2 episodes
1955	The Life and Legend of Wyatt Earp	Pat Smith	Episode: "The Big Baby Contest"
1956	Have Camera Will Travel	Larry	Television film
1956	Dr. Hudson's Secret Journal		Episode: "The Diana Story"
1956	The Millionaire	Victor Volante	Episode: "The Victor Volante Story"
1956	The Loretta Young Show	Al Kiner	Episode: "Now a Brief Word"
1956	The Adventures of Jim Bowie	Rafe Bradford	Episode: "Broomstick Wedding"
1956	Gunsmoke	Bostick	Episode: "The Mistake" (credited as Touch Connors)
1956	The People's Choice	Bob Staples	Episode: "Sock and the Law"
1956–59	State Trooper	Jim Madison / Jim Herndon	2 episodes
1957	Hey, Jeannie!	Lash Connor	Episode: "Jeannie, the Westerner"
1957	Sheriff of Cochise	Jess Stiles	Episode: "Husband and Wife"
1957	Code 3	Bill Dalhart	Episode: "The Water Skier"
1957	Lux Video Theatre	Glen Kramer	Episode: "The Latch Key"
1957	The Silent Service	Don Melhop	Episode: "The Ordeal of S-38"
1957	Those Whiting Girls	Hotel Guest	Episode: "The Trio"
1957	M Squad	Pete Wikowlski	Episode: "Pete Loves Mary"
1957	Have Gun – Will Travel	Johnny Dart	Episode: "The Bride"
1957	The Gale Storm Show	Jerry Moss	Episode: "Mardi Gras"
1957	Maverick	Sheriff Barney Fillmore / Ralph Jordan	2 episodes
1957	The Walter Winchell File	Dave Hopper	Episode: "The Steep Hill"
1957–59	Whirlybirds	Tom Grimaldi / Wally Otis	2 episodes
1958	Wagon Train	Lt. Miles Borden	Episode: "The Dora Gray Story"
1958	Telephone Time	Cy Yedor	Episode: "The Checkered Flag"
1958	Official Detective	Martin Whiting	Episode: "The Cover-Up"
1958	Studio 57	Patrolman Jeff Saunders / Hap Gordon	2 episodes
1958	Cheyenne	Roy Simmons	Episode: "Dead to Rights"
1958	Target		Episode: "Death Makes a Phone Call"
1958	The Texan	Larry Enright	Episode: "The Edge of the Cliff"
1958	Cimarron City	Bill Thatcher	Episode: "Hired Hand"
1958	Rescue 8	Joe Starky	Episode: "Find That Bomb!"
1958	Jefferson Drum	Simon Pitt	Episode: "Simon Pitt"
1958	Lawman	Hal Daniels	Episode: "Lady in Question"
1959	The Rough Riders	Randall Garrett	Episode: "Wilderness Trace"
1959	Bronco	Hurd Elliott	Episode: "School for Cowards"
1959	Alcoa Presents: One Step Beyond	Mario Patruzzio	Episode: "The Aerialist"
1959	The Californians	Charles Cora	Episode: "The Bell Tolls"
1959	Mickey Spillane's Mike Hammer	Marty / Lou Torrey	2 episodes
1959–60	Tightrope!	Nick Stone	37 episodes
1962	The Untouchables	Eddie O'Gara	Episode: "The Eddie O'Gara Story"
1962	The Expendables	Mike	Television film
1963	Redigo	Jack Marston	Episode: "Shadow of the Cougar"
1964	Perry Mason	Joe Kelly	Episode: "The Case of the Bullied Bowler"
1967–75	Mannix	Joe Mannix	194 episodes Golden Globe Award for Best Actor – Television Series Drama (1970); Nominated—Golden Globe Award for Best Actor – Television Series Drama (1971–1975); Nominated—Primetime Emmy Award for Outstanding Lead Actor in a Drama Series (1970–1973)
1968–70	The Red Skelton Show	Various	3 episodes
1971	Here's Lucy	Joe Mannix	Episode: "Lucy and Mannix Are Held Hostage"
1973	Beg, Borrow, or Steal	Vic Cummings	Television film
1973	Bob Hope Special	Joe Mannix	Private Eyes spoof skit with Hope as "Cannon"
1976	The Killer Who Wouldn't Die	Karl Ohanian	Television film
1976	Charo	Gen. George Washington	Television film
1976	Revenge For A Rape	Travis Green	Television film
1977	Police Story	Curtis 'Manny' Mandell	Episode: "Stigma"
1978	Long Journey Back	Vic Casella	Television film
1979	The Death of Ocean View Park	Sam Jackson	Television film
1979	High Midnight	Capt. Lou Mikalich	Television film
1980	Casino	Nick	Television film
1981–82	The Love Boat	Mark Hayward / Sidney Sloan	4 episodes
1981–82	Today's FBI	Ben Slater	18 episodes
1984	Earthlings	Captain Jim Adams	Television film, unsold pilot
1984	Glitter		Episode: "Pilot"
1984	The Fall Guy	Himself	Episode: "Private Eyes"
1988–89	War and Remembrance	Col. Harrison 'Hack' Peters	4 episodes
1989	Alfred Hitchcock Presents	Robert Logan	Episode: "Driving Under the Influence"
1989–95	Murder, She Wrote	Boyce Brown / Walter Murray	3 episodes
1993	Armen and Bullik	Joe 'Uncle Do Do' Armen	Television film
1993	The Commish	James Hayden	Episode: "Scali, P.I."
1993	Hart to Hart Returns	Bill McDowell	Television film
1994	Burke's Law	Jack Duncan	Episode: "Who Killed the Anchorman?"
1997	Diagnosis: Murder	Joe Mannix	Episode: "Hard-Boiled Murder"
1998	Walker, Texas Ranger	Judge Arthur McSpadden	Episode: "Code of the West"
1998–99	Hercules	Chipacles (voice)	10 episodes
2007	Two and a Half Men	Hugo	Episode: "Prostitutes and Gelato"

== Awards and nominations ==
Award	Year	Category	Nominated work	Result
Golden Globe Awards	1970	Best Actor – Television Series Drama	Mannix	Won
Golden Globe Awards	1971	Best Actor – Television Series Drama	Mannix	Nominated
Golden Globe Awards	1972	Best Actor – Television Series Drama	Mannix	Nominated
Golden Globe Awards	1973	Best Actor – Television Series Drama	Mannix	Nominated
Golden Globe Awards	1974	Best Actor – Television Series Drama	Mannix	Nominated
Golden Globe Awards	1975	Best Actor – Television Series Drama	Mannix	Nominated
Primetime Emmy Awards	1972	Outstanding Lead Actor in a Drama Series	Mannix	Nominated
Primetime Emmy Awards	1970	Outstanding Lead Actor in a Drama Series	Mannix	Nominated
Primetime Emmy Awards	1971	Outstanding Lead Actor in a Drama Series	Mannix	Nominated
Primetime Emmy Awards	1973	Outstanding Lead Actor in a Drama Series	Mannix	Nominated
