= Mean Johnny Barrows =

1975 film by Fred Williamson

- Film poster by John Solie
- Directed by: Fred Williamson
- Written by: Jolivett Cato; Charles Walker
- Produced by: Fred Williamson
- Starring: Fred Williamson; Roddy McDowall; Stuart Whitman; Luther Adler; Jenny Sherman; Elliott Gould
- Music by: Coleridge-Taylor Perkinson; Paul Riser
- Production company: Romana Productions
- Distributed by: Atlas Films
- Release date: November 27, 1975 (United States)
- Running time: 85 minutes (Theatrical Cut), 95 minutes (Director's Cut)
- Country: United States
- Language: English
- Box office: $300,000 (estimated)

Mean Johnny Barrows is a 1975 American crime drama film starring Fred Williamson, who also directed the film; Stuart Whitman; Luther Adler; Jenny Sherman; and Roddy McDowall also star. Leon Isaac Kennedy also makes a brief cameo as a soldier in the beginning of the film.

== Plot ==
Johnny Barrows, a winner of the Silver Star is set up by his captain O'Malley when he inadvertently steps on a landmine. When O'Malley mocks him, Johnny slaps him, leading him to be dishonorably discharged from the army. Shipped back home to Los Angeles, Johnny promptly gets mugged and arrested by some racist cops who believe him to be drunk.

Walking into an Italian restaurant hoping for a handout, he's offered a job as a killer by Mafiosi Mario Racconi and his girlfriend Nancy, but Johnny turns him down, not desperate enough to work for the mob. Eventually, Johnny lands a job at a gas station cleaning toilets and scrubbing floors for the mean penny-pinching Richard. When Johnny asks for his money, he only gets 21 dollars for the time he's worked there, and as a result, beats him up. The cops arrive, and eventually arrest him.

Meanwhile, a Mafia war starts brewing between the Racconi family and the Da Vinces, who want to bring in drugs and start selling it to black and Hispanic kids. The Racconis, being an upstanding mob family, doesn't want that to happen. The Racconis eventually confront the Da Vinces, who shoot everyone but Mario dead. Nancy picks up Johnny from the police station, and they visit him in the hospital the next day. Mario promises Johnny the money to wipe out the Da Vinces, which he reluctantly accepts.

Nancy is kidnapped by the Da Vincis and gets a message to Johnny claiming that she was made to do "terrible things". But in reality, she is secretly dating Tony Da Vince, who is planning to merge empires. Johnny goes to the flower shop owned by the Da Vinces and kills some of the family. Anticipating the shooting, Tony plans to leave to Mexico on his yacht, but Johnny sneaks on board, holds him at gunpoint, and makes him jump off the boat, causing him to drown.

Don Da Vince, hearing about Tony's death, sends out a hitman to kill Johnny with Nancy helping him. The hitman drives by and throws a shuriken at Johnny, nearly hitting him, before driving away. Johnny then goes to the flower shop and kills the rest of the family, but the hitman still pursues him, and the hitman is revealed to be captain O'Malley. They engage in a brief kung fu fight, with Johnny eventually killing him. He meets Nancy at his parcel of land in the hills, and kisses her. Nancy then shoots him in the stomach as retribution for killing Tony. As she walks away, she steps on a mine, killing her and leaving Johnny's fate uncertain.

== Cast ==
- Fred Williamson as Johnny Barrows
- Roddy McDowall as Tony Da Vince
- Stuart Whitman as Mario Racconi
- Luther Adler as Don Racconi
- Jenny Sherman as Nancy
- Elliott Gould as Professor Theodore Rasputin Waterhouse
- Anthony Caruso as Don Da Vince
- R.G. Armstrong as Richard
- Mike Henry as Carlo Da Vince
- Aaron Banks as Captain O'Malley
- Robert Phillips as Ben
- James Brown as Police Sergeant
- Leon Issac Kennedy (credited as Leon Issac) as Pvt. Pickens

== Production ==
Even though the original soundtrack was composed by Coleridge-Taylor Perkinson and Paul Riser, two songs composed by Gordon Staples from his album Strung Out are heard consistently throughout the film. (Strung Out & Sounds Of The Zodiac)

== Release ==
The film was released on November 27, 1975 in the United States and had made at least $300,000 by December 31, 1975. The theatrical version of the film ran about 85 minutes, and when it was initially released on home video, was bootlegged and released with entire scenes missing. Code Red restored the film to a longer, better quality 95 minute director's cut and released it on DVD in 2010 and on Blu-ray in 2016.

== Reception ==
The January 19, 1976 issue of the Los Angeles Times gave a mixed review, praising Williamson's performance in a weak screenplay.
