= Big Time (1977 film) =

Big Time is a 1977 American film directed by Andrew Georgias. Its budget was £300,000, provided entirely by Motown Records. The story was written by Anton Diether, Leon Isaac Kennedy (billed as Leon Isaac), Christipher Joy, and Smokey Robinson, based on an original idea by Andrew Georgias and Louis Gross.

The film was scored by Smokey Robinson, and spawned a popular soundtrack album.

== Cast ==
- Christipher Joy
- Tobar Mayo
- Jayne Kennedy
- Roger E. Mosley
