= Sweet Jesus, Preacherman =

1973 American action film directed by Henning Schellerup

- Theatrical release poster
- Directed by: Henning Schellerup
- Written by: John Cerullo; M. Stuart Madden; Abbey Leitch
- Produced by: Daniel Cady
- Starring: Roger E. Mosley; William Smith; Michael Pataki
- Cinematography: Paul Hipp
- Edited by: Warren Hamilton Jr.
- Music by: Horace Tapscott
- Production companies: Capitol Cinema; Entertainment Pyramid Inc.
- Distributed by: Metro-Goldwyn-Mayer
- Release date: May 25, 1973
- Running time: 99 minutes
- Country: United States
- Language: English

Sweet Jesus, Preacherman is a 1973 American blaxploitation action film directed by Henning Schellerup and written by John Cerullo, M. Stuart Madden and Abbey Leitch. The film stars Roger E. Mosley, William Smith, Michael Pataki, Tom Johnigarn, Joe Tornatore and Damu King. The film was released on May 25, 1973, by Metro-Goldwyn-Mayer.

== Plot ==
Holmes is a hitman who has killed one victim after another. Having taken the life of a large number of them, he is sent by his boss, Martelli, to infiltrate a section of the black quarter of the inner city. To do this, he becomes Reverend Lee, a Baptist preacher who comes to the local church to preach. Finding that other thugs are there, he decides to take the entire section for himself.

== Cast ==
- Roger E. Mosley as Holmes / Lee
- William Smith as Martelli
- Michael Pataki as State Senator Sills
- Tom Johnigarn as Eddie Stoner
- Joe Tornatore as Joey
- Damu King as "Sweetstick"
- Marla Gibbs as Beverly Solomon
- Sam Laws as Deacon Greene
- Phil Hoover as George Orr
- Paul Silliman as Roy
- Chuck Lyles as Detroit Charlie
- Norman Fields as Police Captain
- Della Thomas as Foxey
- Amentha Dymally as Mrs. Greene
- Patricia Edwards as Marion Hicks
- Chuck Douglas Jr. as Lenny Solomon
- Vincent LaBauve as Bobby Thompson
- Chuck Wells as Eli Stoner
- Betty Coleman as Maxine Gibbs
- Lou Jackson as Randy Gibbs
- Lillian Tarry as Mother Gibbs
- T.C. Ellis as Earl Saunders
- Lee Frost as 1st Policeman
- Joanne Bruno as Widow Foster (credited as Jo Ann Bruno)
- K.D. Friend as Funeral Minister
- Gordon James as Restaurant Hood
- Billy Quinn as Sweetstick's Bodyguard

== Legacy ==
The movie’s poster, along with Hit Man, inspired the album cover art for Scaring the Hoes, a collaborative studio album between JPEGMafia and Danny Brown.

== See also ==
- List of American films of 1973
