= Leadbelly (film) =

1976 film by Gordon Parks

- Wide movie poster
- Directed by: Gordon Parks
- Written by: Ernest Kinoy
- Produced by: Marc Merson; David Paradine
- Starring: Roger E. Mosley
- Cinematography: Bruce Surtees
- Edited by: Harry Howard; Thomas Penick
- Music by: Huddie Ledbetter; Fred Karlin
- Distributed by: Paramount Pictures
- Release date: May 28, 1976
- Running time: 126 minutes
- Country: United States
- Language: English

Leadbelly is a 1976 American drama film chronicling the life of blues singer Huddie Ledbetter (better known as "Lead Belly"). The film was directed by Gordon Parks, and starred Roger E. Mosley in the title role. The film focuses on the troubles of Lead Belly's youth in the segregated South including his time in prison, and his efforts to use his music to gain release.

== Plot ==
Fleeing both a firearms charge and the unwanted pregnancy of his girlfriend, Huddie Ledbetter leaves his father's house just barely into his twenties. He arrives at a brothel on Fannin Street in Shreveport, Louisiana, and meets its madam, Miss Eula. She takes a liking to him, nicknaming him Leadbelly and having him play guitar and sing at its bar. For a while, she takes care of him, until he bristles being under her leash. Police arrive and break up a show he's playing at. Leadbelly and an old man escape via a train and Leadbelly buys a twelve-string acoustic guitar from him. Seeking work, he takes a job picking cotton. He soon leaves on a train to Silver City where he meets Blind Lemon Jefferson and they start playing shows together.

At one show, a drunken white man tells Leadbelly to keep playing, and threatens him. Leadbelly responds by smashing his guitar onto him and is arrested. He escapes from jail and leads a normal life until he and two other men are on their way home after a night of drinking. One of the men mentions that Leadbelly had sex with the other man's woman during the evening. The man pulls out a gun to shoot Leadbelly but Leadbelly draws his own and shoots the other man first, killing him. He is thrown in prison where he is forced to work on a chain gang. When he tries to escape, he is caught and put in a sweat box. His father arrives and tries to bail Leadbelly out, but fails. Before leaving, he gives money to the warden to get Leadbelly a twelve-string acoustic guitar.

While in prison, Leadbelly is requested to play a song for Governor Pat Neff, who assures him a pardon before he leaves office. Upon Leadbelly's release, he returns to Fannin Street, which has fallen into ruin. He meets Miss Eula, who has suffered the same fate. He returns to his father's home only to find that a white family has taken it over. Responding to an exaggerated alert by its new tenant, a group of white men attack Leadbelly and slash his throat. Leadbelly stabs and kills one of them in self-defense, but is thrown back in prison.

Folk song historians John and Alan Lomax are documenting the history of the blues. They visit the prison and interview Leadbelly, recording all his songs. After he finishes telling his life story, they volunteer to see what they can do about getting him out of prison. He responds he has only six months to go, and is resolved to serving them out.

The film ends with a title card stating that Leadbelly was released from prison and went on to pursue his music career in the big cities of America, even performing at New York City's famous Carnegie Hall.

== Cast ==
- Roger E. Mosley as Huddie "Lead Belly" Ledbetter / Walter Boyd
- Paul Benjamin as Wes Ledbetter
- Madge Sinclair as Miss Eula
- Alan Manson as Prison Chief Guard
- Albert Hall as Dicklikker
- Art Evans as Blind Lemon Jefferson
- James Brodhead as John Lomax
- John Henry Faulk as Governor Pat Neff
- Vivian Bonnell as Old Lady
- Ernie Hudson as Archie
- Dana Manno as Margaret Judd
- Lynn Hamilton as Sally Ledbetter
- William Wintersole as Sheriff
