= Penitentiary II =

- Theatrical release poster
- Directed by: Jamaa Fanaka
- Written by: Jamaa Fanaka
- Produced by: Jamaa Fanaka
- Starring: Leon Isaac Kennedy
- Cinematography: Stephen L. Posey
- Edited by: James E. Nownes
- Music by: Jack Wheaton
- Production company: United Artists
- Distributed by: MGM/United Artists Distribution and Marketing
- Release date: April 2, 1982
- Running time: 108 minutes
- Country: United States
- Language: English
- Budget: $365,000
- Box office: $3 million

Penitentiary II is a 1982 American blaxploitation drama film directed by Jamaa Fanaka. Released on April 2, 1982, the film is the sequel to 1979's Penitentiary. It was followed by another sequel, Penitentiary III, which was released in August 1987.

== Plot ==
Martel "Too Sweet" Gordone earned his parole from jail by winning a prison boxing tournament. All Too Sweet wants to do is start a peaceful life, but a condition of his release is that he work for a boxing promoter. Too Sweet has no interest in boxing and wants to live with his sister and her husband who support his desire to start over. However, when an old enemy from prison, Half Dead, escapes and kills his girlfriend, Too Sweet changes his plans and returns to the ring.

== Cast ==
- Leon Isaac Kennedy as Martel "Too Sweet" Gordone
- Eugenia Wright as Clarisse
- Glynn Turman as Charles Johnson
- Mr. T as Himself
- Archie Moore as Himself
- Ernie Hudson as "Half-Dead" Johnson
- Peggy Blow as Ellen Johnson
- Sephton Moody as Charles Johnson Jr.
- Donovan Womack as Jesse "The Bull" Amos
- Malik Carter as Hezzikia "Seldom Seems" Jackson
- Stan Kamber as Sam Cunningham
- Cepheus Jaxon as "Do Dirty"
- Marvin Jones as "Simp"
- Ebony Wright as "Sugar"
- Renn Woods as Nikki
- Lyrica Garrett as Evelyn
- Gerald Berns as Beau Flynn, Light Heavyweight Champion
- Tony Cox as "Midget"
- Wilbur "Hi-Fi" White as "Hi-Fi"
- Warren Bryant as "Ms. Thing"
- Alfred Mariorenzi as The Warden
- Dennis Lipscomb as Announcer
- Hawthorne James as 1st Referee
- Allan Graf as 2nd Referee

== See also ==
- List of boxing films
- List of hood films
