= Jamaa Fanaka =

American filmmaker

- Born: Walter Gordon; September 6, 1942; Jackson, Mississippi, U.S.
- Died: April 1, 2012 (aged 69)
- Education: Compton Junior College, UCLA
- Occupations: Film director, producer, screenwriter
- Years active: 1972–2012
- Parent(s): Robert L. and Beatrice Gordon

Jamaa Fanaka (born Walter Gordon; September 6, 1942 – April 1, 2012) was an American filmmaker. He is best known for his 1979 film Penitentiary, and was one of the leading directors of the L.A. Rebellion film movement.

== Early life and education ==
Fanaka was born Walter Gordon to Robert L. and Beatrice Gordon in Jackson, Mississippi. In 1971, Fanaka was accepted into the film school at UCLA. His first film, A Day in the Life of Willie Faust, or Death on the Installment Plan, was a morality tale shot in 8mm film about a heroin addict. The film stars Fanaka (credited as Walt Gordon) in the title role. It is the only narrative short he ever made. Jan-Christopher Horak of the UCLA Film Archives, when comparing the movie with the 1972 blaxploitation film Super Fly, released the same year, observed, "unlike Priest's elegant cocaine consumption in Super Fly, Willie's arm gushes blood as he injects heroin".

Ntongela Masilela states that while "a fundamental tenet of the Los Angeles school was an opposition to Hollywood", Fanaka was a notable exception. He describes Fanaka as "very much fascinated by Hollywood and averse to the contentious ideological and artistic discussions that were fundamental to the formation of the school".

While a student at UCLA, he went to see a film called Cooley High. Impressed with the film and its depiction of African American culture, he took note of the director, Michael Schultz, and assumed he was Jewish. He was later surprised to learn that Schultz was in fact African American. He decided then to change his name so that anyone seeing his films would know he is black. He contacted one of the professors in the African Studies department at UCLA, who showed him a Swahili dictionary, which is how he came up with the name Jamaa Fanaka, which loosely means "through togetherness we will find success".

== Career ==
During film school, Fanaka wrote, produced and directed Emma Mae (1976). The film focuses on a young woman who arrives in Los Angeles from Mississippi to live with her mother's sister and her family after her mother dies, and survives the culture shock that accompanies the move; Welcome Home Brother Charles (1975), about the ravages and dire consequences of racism; and Penitentiary (1979), the story of a young man wrongly sent to prison, who, through his boxing talents, is able to win his freedom.

Fanaka completed Street Wars in 1992. He was in extended production and post-production on Hip Hop Hope, a documentary feature film on the underground hip hop culture.

== Filmography ==
- A Day in the Life of Willie Faust, or Death on the Installment Plan (short, 1972)
- Welcome Home Brother Charles (1975)
- Emma Mae (1976)
- Penitentiary (1979)
- Penitentiary II (1982)
- Penitentiary III (1987)
- Street Wars (1992)
