= Penitentiary III =

- Theatrical release poster
- Directed by: Jamaa Fanaka
- Screenplay by: Jamaa Fanaka
- Produced by: Jamaa Fanaka; Leon Isaac Kennedy
- Starring: Leon Isaac Kennedy; Anthony Geary; Steve Antin; Ric Mancini; Marie Burrell Fanaka; Raymond Kessler
- Cinematography: Marty Ollstein
- Edited by: Alain Jakubowicz
- Music by: Garry Schyman
- Production company: The Cannon Group
- Distributed by: Cannon Film Distributors
- Release date: September 4, 1987
- Running time: 91 minutes
- Country: United States
- Language: English
- Box office: $1,392,616

Penitentiary III is a 1987 American crime drama film written and directed by Jamaa Fanaka. It is the sequel to the 1982 film Penitentiary II. The film stars Leon Isaac Kennedy, Anthony Geary, Steve Antin, Ric Mancini, Marie Burrell Fanaka and Raymond Kessler. The film was released on September 4, 1987, by Cannon Film Distributors.

A man is framed for murder and sent to prison. He is beaten and tortured, then forced to fight the prison's worst killer, a martial-arts fighting midget called Thud.

== Cast ==
- Leon Isaac Kennedy as Martel "Too Sweet" Gordone
- Anthony Geary as Serenghetti
- Steve Antin as Roscoe
- Ric Mancini as The Warden
- Marie Burrell Fanaka as Chelsea Remington
- Raymond Kessler as "Midnight Thud" Jessup
- Rick Zumwalt as Joshua
- Magic Schwarz as Hugo
- Jim Bailey as Cleopatra
- "Big Bull" Bates as "Simp"
- "Big Yank" as "Rock"
- Bert Williams as Tim Shoah
- Mark Kemble as Rufus
- Jack Rader as Fred
- Madison Campudoni as "El Cid"
- George Payne as Jess / Inmate #1
- Drew Bundini Brown as "Sugg" / Inmate #2
- Mindi Miller as "Sugar"
- J. J. Johnston as Announcer #1
- Earl Garnes as Announcer #2
- James Phillips as Suited Gentleman
- Faith Minton as Female Boxer
- Marcella Ross as Female Boxer
- Raye Hollitt as Female Boxer
- Danny Trejo as "See Veer"
- Mary O'Connor as Female Guard
- Gardella Demilo as Female Guard
- Ron Demps as Referee
