= Black Sister's Revenge =

- Directed by: Jamaa Fanaka
- Written by: Jamaa Fanaka
- Produced by: Jamaa Fanaka
- Starring: Jerri Hayes; Ernest Williams III; Charles David Brooks III
- Cinematography: Stephen Posey
- Edited by: Robert A. Fitzgerald
- Music by: H.B. Barnum
- Distributed by: International Pictures
- Release date: 1976
- Running time: 100 minutes
- Country: United States
- Language: English

Black Sister's Revenge is a 1976 Blaxploitation film written and directed by Jamaa Fanaka. The film stars Jerri Hayes, Ernest Williams III, and Charles David Brooks, III. The film was released theatrically as Emma Mae, then re-titled to Black Sister's Revenge for home video release.

== Plot ==
Black Sister's Revenge is about a teen moving from a small Southern town in Mississippi to live with her family in Los Angeles. When Emma Mae (Jerri Hayes) first moves to Los Angeles, she's introduced to Jesse Amos (Ernest Williams III), with whom she instantly falls in love. Jesse and Zeke (Charles David Brooks III) are eventually locked up for assaulting an officer.

When Jesse and Zeke go to jail, Emma Mae starts a car wash to raise money for bail. When that fails, she plots a bank robbery to get the cash for his bail. She later finds out that he doesn't love her, and used her, leading to Emma Mae's dramatic fight scene, beating Jesse senseless and her final speech about how stupid she and the group were, still having gang wars and following behind Jesse. While a beaten Jesse is carried back into the house, Emma Mae walks home with her cousins.

== Cast ==
- Jerri Hayes as Emma Mae
- Ernest Williams II as Jesse Amos
- Charles D. Brooks III as Ezekiel "Zeke" Johnson
- Leopoldo Mandeville as Chay
- Malik Carter as "Big Daddy" Johnson
- Eddie Allen as James
- Gammy Burdett as Daisy Stansell
- Teri Taylor as Dara Stansell
- Synthia Saint James as Ulika Stansell
- Robert Slaughter as Devo
- Eddy C. Dyer as Huari Stansell
- Laetitia Burdett as Melik Stansell

== See also ==
- List of American films of 1976
- List of hood films
