= List of American films of 1974 =

This is a list of American films released in 1974.

== Box office ==
The highest-grossing American films released in 1974, by domestic box office gross revenue as estimated by The Numbers, are as follows:

Highest-grossing films of 1974
Rank	Title	Distributor	Domestic gross
1	Blazing Saddles	Warner Bros.	$119,500,000
2	The Towering Inferno	20th Century Fox / Warner Bros.	$116,000,000
3	The Trial of Billy Jack	Warner Bros.	$89,000,000
4	Young Frankenstein	20th Century Fox	$86,300,000
5	Earthquake	Universal	$79,700,000
6	The Godfather Part II	Paramount	$57,300,000
7	Airport 1975	Universal	$47,285,152
8	The Life and Times of Grizzly Adams	Sunn Classic	$45,411,063
9	The Longest Yard	Paramount	$43,008,075
10	Murder on the Orient Express	Anglo-EMI Film Distributors	$35,733,867

== January–March ==
Opening		Title	Production company	Cast and crew	Ref.
J A N U A R Y	1	Ladies and Gentlemen: The Rolling Stones	Dragonaire Ltd.	Rollin Binzer (director); The Rolling Stones	
J A N U A R Y	4	McQ	Warner Bros. / Batjac Productions	John Sturges (director); Lawrence Roman (screenplay); John Wayne, Eddie Albert, Diana Muldaur, Colleen Dewhurst, Clu Gulager, David Huddleston, Jim Watkins, Al Lettieri, Julie Adams, Roger E. Mosley, William Bryant, Richard Kelton, Richard Eastham, Larry Buck, Kim Sanford	
J A N U A R Y	13	The Satanic Rites of Dracula	Columbia-Warner Distributors / Hammer Film Productions	Alan Gibson (director); Don Houghton (screenplay); Christopher Lee, Peter Cushing, Michael Coles, William Franklyn	
J A N U A R Y	15	The Arena	Variety Distribution / Rover Film	Steve Carver (director); John William Corrington, Joyce Hooper Corrington (screenplay); Pam Grier, Margaret Markov, Paul Müller, Daniele Vargas, Rosalba Neri, Vassili Karis, Mimmo Palmara, Antonio Casale, Lucretia Love, Marie Louise, Mary Count, Sid Lawrence, Franco Garofalo, Pietro Ceccarelli, Jho Jhenkins	
J A N U A R Y	21	Luther	American Film Theatre	Guy Green (director); Edward Anhalt (screenplay); Stacy Keach, Julian Glover, Maurice Denham, Judi Dench, Patrick Magee, Hugh Griffith, Robert Stephens, Peter Cellier, Leonard Rossiter, Thomas Heathcote, Matthew Guinness, Alan Badel, Bruce Carstairs, Malcolm Stoddard	
J A N U A R Y	21	Rhinoceros	American Film Theatre	Tom O'Horgan (director); Julian Barry, Eugène Ionesco (screenplay); Zero Mostel, Gene Wilder, Karen Black, Joe Silver, Marilyn Chris, Percy Rodrigues, Robert Fields, Don Calfa, Lou Cutell, Howard Morton, Anne Ramsey, Lorna Thayer, Robert Weil, Melody Santangello, Manuel Aviles	
J A N U A R Y	28	Black Belt Jones	Warner Bros. / Sequoin Films	Robert Clouse (director); Oscar Williams (screenplay); Jim Kelly, Gloria Hendry, Scatman Crothers, Eric Laneuville, Andre Philippe, Mel Novak, Earl Jolly Brown, Earl Maynard, Marla Gibbs, Ted Lange, Esther Sutherland, Alan Weeks, Vincent Barbi, Malik Carter, Eddie Smith, Jac Emil, Clarence Barnes, Nate Esformes	
J A N U A R Y	30	The Bat People	American International Pictures	Jerry Jameson (director); Lou Shaw (screenplay); Stewart Moss, Marianne McAndrew, Michael Pataki, Paul Carr, Arthur Space, Robert Berk, Pat Delaney, George Paulsin, Bonnie Van Dyke, Jennifer Kulik, Laurie Brooks Jefferson, Herb Pierce	
F E B R U A R Y	2	The Street Fighter	Toei Company	Shigehiro Ozawa (director); Kōji Takada, Motohiro Torii (screenplay); Shinichi "Sonny" Triba, Yutaka "Doris" Nakajima, Masashi "Milton" Ishibashi, Jirō Yabuki, Etsuko "Sue" Shihomi, Nobuo Kawai, Ken Kazama, Rinichi Yamamoto	
F E B R U A R Y	6	Zardoz	20th Century Fox	John Boorman (director/screenplay); Sean Connery, Charlotte Rampling, Sara Kestelman, Niall Buggy, John Alderton, Bosco Hogan, Bairbre Dowling, Christopher Casson, Sally Anne Newton, Jessica Swift, Reginald Jarman	
F E B R U A R Y	7	Blazing Saddles	Warner Bros. / Crossbow Productions	Mel Brooks (director/screenplay); Norman Steinberg, Andrew Bergman, Richard Pryor, Alan Uger (screenplay); Cleavon Little, Gene Wilder, Slim Pickens, Alex Karras, Mel Brooks, Harvey Korman, Madeline Kahn, Burton Gilliam, David Huddleston, Liam Dunn, John Hillerman, George Furth	
F E B R U A R Y	7	Sugar Hill	American International Pictures	Paul Maslansky (director); Tim Kelly (screenplay); Marki Bey, Robert Quarry, Don Pedro Colley, Betty Anne Rees, Richard Lawson, Zara Cully, Charles P. Robinson, Big Walter Price, Larry D. Johnson, Rick Hagood, Ed Geldart, Albert J. Baker, Raymond E. Simpson III, Thomas C. Carroll, Charles Krohn, J. Randall Bell	
F E B R U A R Y	11	Thieves Like Us	United Artists	Robert Altman (director/screenplay); Joan Tewkesbury, Calder Willingham (screenplay); Keith Carradine, Shelley Duvall, John Schuck, Bert Remsen, Louise Fletcher, Tom Skerritt, Joan Maguire, Franklin D. Roosevelt	
F E B R U A R Y	15	Crazy Joe	Columbia Pictures / Produzioni De Laurentiis / Bright-Persky Associates	Carlo Lizzani (director); Lewis John Carlino (screenplay); Peter Boyle, Paula Prentiss, Fred Williamson, Charles Cioffi, Fausto Tozzi, Guido Leontini, Rip Torn	
F E B R U A R Y	22	Alien Thunder	American International Pictures / Cinerama Releasing Corporation / Onyx Films	Claude Fournier (director); George Malko (screenplay); Donald Sutherland, Gordon Tootoosis, Chief Dan George, Kevin McCarthy, Jean Duceppe, Francine Racette, James O'Shea, John Boylan, Jack Creley, Lenny George, Ernestine Gamble, Vincent Daniels, Sarain Stump	
F E B R U A R Y	23	From Beyond the Grave	Warner Bros. / Amicus Productions	Kevin Connor (director); Raymond Christodoulou, Robin Clarke (screenplay); Peter Cushing, Donald Pleasence, Ian Bannen, Diana Dors, David Warner, Angela Pleasence	
F E B R U A R Y	27	Busting	United Artists	Peter Hyams (director/screenplay); Elliott Gould, Robert Blake, Allen Garfield, Antonio Fargas, Michael Lerner, Sid Haig, Ivor Francis, William Sylvester, Logan Ramsey	
F E B R U A R Y	27	Man on a Swing	Paramount Pictures / Jaffilms Inc.	Frank Perry (director); David Zelag Goodman (screenplay); Cliff Robertson, Joel Grey, Elizabeth Wilson, George Voskovec, Peter Masterson, Lane Smith, Christopher Allport, Richard Venture, Dianne Hull, Gil Gerard, Alice Drummond, Richard McKenzie, Clarice Blackburn	
M A R C H	7	Billy Two Hats	United Artists / Algonquin Films	Ted Kotcheff (director); Alan Sharp (screenplay); Gregory Peck, Desi Arnaz Jr., Jack Warden, David Huddleston, Sian Barbara Allen, John Pearce, Vic Armstrong, Dawn Little Sky, W. Vincent St. Cyr, Henry Medicine Hat, Zev Berlinsky, Antony Scott	
M A R C H	14	Alice in Wonderland (re-release)	Walt Disney Productions / Buena Vista Distribution	Clyde Geronimi, Wilfred Jackson, Hamilton Luske (directors); Winston Hibler, Ted Sears, Bill Peet, Erdman Penner, Joe Rinaldi, Milt Banta, Bill Cottrell, Dick Kelsey, Joe Grant (screenplay); Kathryn Beaumont, Ed Wynn, Richard Haydn, Sterling Holloway, Jerry Colonna, Verna Felton, J. Pat O'Malley, Bill Thompson, Heather Angel, Joseph Kearns, Larry Grey, Queenie Leonard, Dink Trout, Doris Lloyd, Jimmy MacDonald, The Mellomen, Don Barclay, Lynn Bari, Lucille Bliss, Pinto Colvig, Clarence Nash, Marni Nixon, Erdman Penner, Thurl Ravenscroft, Norma Zimmer	
M A R C H	15	Three Tough Guys	Titanus / Produzioni Cinematografiche Inter. Ma. Co. / Columbia Film	Duccio Tessari (director); Luciano Vincenzoni, Nicola Badalucco (screenplay); Lino Ventura, Isaac Hayes, Fred Williamson, Paula Kelly, William Berger, Vittorio Sanipoli, Lorella De Luca, Mario Erpichini, Jess Hahn, Jacques Herlin, Guido Leontini, Luciano Salce, Nazzareno Zamperla	
M A R C H	20	The Super Cops (debut in its plot and filming city, New York, with its Los Angeles debut on April 10)	United Artists	Gordon Parks (director); Lorenzo Semple Jr. (screenplay); Ron Leibman, David Selby, Sheila Frazier, Pat Hingle, Dan Frazer, Joseph Sirola, Amy Freeman, Bernard Kates, Ralph Wilcox, Albert Henderson, Alex Colon, Charles Turner, Al Fann	
M A R C H	21	Godzilla vs. Mechagodzilla – (Japan)	Toho	Jun Fukuda (director/screenplay); Hiroyasu Yamamura (screenplay); Masaaki Daimon, Kazuya Aoyama, Akihiko Hirata, Hiroshi Koizumi, Reiko Tajima, Hiromi Matsushita, Gorō Mutsumi, Shin Kishida, Beru-Bera Lin, Masao Imafuku, Daigo Kusano, Kenji Sahara, Isao Zushi, Kazunari Mori, Kin'ichi Kusumi	
M A R C H	22	Catch My Soul	Cinerama Releasing Corporation / Metromedia Productions	Patrick McGoohan (director); William Shakespeare, Jack Good (screenplay); Richie Havens, Lance LeGault, Season Hubley, Tony Joe White, Susan Tyrrell, Delaney Bramlett, Bonnie Bramlett, Billy Joe Royal, Raleigh Gardenhire, Wayne Waterhouse	
M A R C H	27	Conrack	20th Century Fox	Martin Ritt (director); Harriet Frank Jr., Irving Ravetch (screenplay); Jon Voight, Paul Winfield, Hume Cronyn, Madge Sinclair, Tina Andrews, Antonio Fargas, Ruth Attaway, James O'Rear	
M A R C H	27	Mame	Warner Bros. / ABC	Gene Saks (director); Paul Zindel (screenplay); Lucille Ball, Beatrice Arthur, Robert Preston, Bruce Davison, Jane Connell, Joyce Van Patten, Lucille Benson, Doria Cook-Nelson, Don Porter, Audrey Christie, John McGiver, Bobbi Jordan, Patrick Labyorteaux	
M A R C H	28	John Carpenter's directoral debut, Dark Star, limited to Los Angeles' International Film Exposition, aka 'Filmex'.	Bryanston Distributing Company	John Carpenter (director/screenplay); Dan O'Bannon (screenplay); Dan O'Bannon, Brian Narelle, Cal Kuniholm, Andreijah "Dre" Pahich, Joe Saunders, Barbara "Cookie" Knapp, Miles Watkins, John Carpenter, Nick Castle	
M A R C H	29	The Great Gatsby	Paramount Pictures / Newdon Productions	Jack Clayton (director); Francis Ford Coppola (screenplay); Robert Redford, Mia Farrow, Karen Black, Scott Wilson, Sam Waterston, Lois Chiles	

== April–June ==
Opening		Title	Production company	Cast and crew	Ref.
A P R I L	3	The Night Porter	Ital-Noleggio Cinematografico / Lotar Film	Liliana Cavani (director/screenplay); Italo Moscati, Barbara Alberti, Amedeo Pagani, Anthony Forwood (screenplay); Dirk Bogarde, Charlotte Rampling, Philippe Leroy, Gabriele Ferzetti, Giuseppe Addobbati, Isa Miranda, Marino Masé, Amedeo Amodio, Piero Vida, Geoffrey Copleston, Nora Ricci, Nino Bignamini, Manfred Freyberger, Ugo Cardea, Hilda Gunther, Piero Mazzinghi, Kai-Siegfried Seefeld	
A P R I L	5	The Golden Voyage of Sinbad	Columbia Pictures / Morningside Productions	Gordon Hessler (director); Brian Clemens (screenplay); John Phillip Law, Tom Baker, Takis Emmanuel, Caroline Munro, Douglas Wilmer, Grégoire Aslan, David Garfield, Kurt Christian, Martin Shaw, Aldo Sambrell, Robert Shaw	
A P R I L	5	The Sugarland Express	Universal Pictures / The Zanuck/Brown Company	Steven Spielberg (director); Hal Barwood, Matthew Robbins (screenplay); Goldie Hawn, Ben Johnson, William Atherton, Michael Sacks, Gregory Walcott, Steve Kanaly, Louise Latham, Dean Smith, Bill Thurman	
A P R I L	5	Foxy Brown	American International Pictures	Jack Hill (director/screenplay); Pam Grier, Peter Brown, Terry Carter, Harry Holcombe, Antonio Fargas, Sid Haig, Bob Minor, Tony Giorgio, H.B. Haggerty, Kathryn Loder, Juanita Brown, Fred Lerner, Boyd "Red" Morgan	
A P R I L	7	Captain Kronos – Vampire Hunter	Paramount Pictures / Hammer Film Productions	Brian Clemens (director/screenplay); Horst Janson, John Cater, Caroline Munro, John Carson, Shane Briant, Wanda Ventham, Ian Hendry, William Hobbs, Paul Greenwood, Robert James	
A P R I L	7	The Conversation	Paramount Pictures (Note: Owned by American Zoetrope with Lionsgate Studios (via Lionsgate Films) handling distribution in North America and StudioCanal internationally) / The Directors Company	Francis Ford Coppola (director/screenplay); Gene Hackman, John Cazale, Allen Garfield, Cindy Williams, Frederic Forrest, Harrison Ford, Michael Higgins, Elizabeth MacRae, Teri Garr, Robert Shields, Robert Duvall, Ramon Bieri, Gian-Carlo Coppola, Billy Dee Williams, Phoebe Alexander	
A P R I L	10	Our Time	Warner Bros.	Peter Hyams (director); Jane C. Stanton (screenplay); Pamela Sue Martin, Parker Stevenson, Debralee Scott, Roderick Cook, Edith Atwater, Meg Wyllie, Mary Jackson, Carol Arthur, Hope Summers, Jerry Hardin, Robert Walden, Darrell Zwerling, Lou Frizzell, Michael Gray, Cliff Emmich, Betsy Slade, George O'Hanlon Jr., Karen Balkin, Nora Heflin, Kathryn Holcomb, Marijane Maricle, Luke Andreas, Helene Winston	
A P R I L	10	Thomasine & Bushrod	Columbia Pictures / Harvey Bernhard Enterprises / Max Julien Ltd.	Gordon Parks Jr. (director); Max Julien (screenplay); Max Julien, Vonetta McGee, George Murdock, Glynn Turman, Juanita Moore, Ben Zeller	
A P R I L	14	Lovin' Molly	Columbia Pictures / S.J.F. Productions	Sidney Lumet (director); Stephen J. Friedman (screenplay); Anthony Perkins, Beau Bridges, Blythe Danner, Susan Sarandon, Edward Binns, Conrad Fowkes, John Henry Faulk, Paul A. Partain, Claude Traverse, Richard Ray Lee	
A P R I L	16	Score	Audubon Films / Jadran Films	Radley Metzger (director); Jerry Douglas (screenplay); Claire Wilbur, Calvin Culver, Lynn Lowry, Gerald Grant, Carl Parker	
A P R I L	19	Caged Heat	New World Pictures	Jonathan Demme (director/screenplay); Juanita Brown, Roberta Collins, Erica Gavin, Ella Reid, Rainbeaux Smith, Barbara Steele, Warren Miller, Crystin Sinclaire, Mickey Fox, Toby Carr Rafelson, Ann Stockdale, Irene Stokes	
A P R I L	19	Son of Dracula	Cinemation Industries / Apple Films	Freddie Francis (director); Jennifer Jayne (screenplay); Harry Nilsson, Ringo Starr, Freddie Jones, Suzanna Leigh, Dennis Price, Peter Frampton, John Bonham, Keith Moon, Klaus Voormann, Leon Russell, David Bailie, Shakira Baksh, Jenny Runacre, Beth Morris, Skip Martin, Hedger Wallace, Dan Meaden, Lorna Wilde, Tina Simmons, Derek Woodward, Louis Flannery	
A P R I L	22	The Beast Must Die	Cinerama Releasing Corporation / Amicus Productions	Paul Annett (director); Michael Winder (screenplay); Calvin Lockhart, Peter Cushing, Marlene Clark, Charles Gray, Anton Diffring, Ciaran Madden, Tom Chadbon, Michael Gambon, Valentine Dyall, Annie Ross	
A P R I L	22	Claudine	20th Century Fox / Third World Cinema Corporation	John Berry (director); Lester Pine, Tina Pine (screenplay); James Earl Jones, Diahann Carroll, Lawrence Hilton-Jacobs, Adam Wade, Roxie Roker, Tamu Blackwell, David Kruger, Yvette Curtis, Eric Jones, Socorro Stephens, Elisa Loti	
A P R I L	24	Lone Wolf and Cub: White Heaven in Hell	Toho / Katsu	Yoshiyuki Kuroda (director); Tsutomu Nakamura (screenplay); Tomisaburo Wakayama, Akihiro Tomikawa, Junko Hitomi, Isao Kimura, Gorō Mutsumi, Minoru Ōki	
A P R I L	29	The Apprenticeship of Duddy Kravitz	Paramount Pictures / International Cinemedia Center / Canadian Film Development Corporation / Welco United Canada / Famous Players / Astral-Bellevue-Pathé / The Duddy Kravitz Syndicate	Ted Kotcheff (director); Mordecai Richler (screenplay); Richard Dreyfuss, Micheline Lanctôt, Jack Warden, Randy Quaid, Joseph Wiseman, Denholm Elliott, Henry Ramer, Joe Silver, Zvee Scooler, Robert Desroches, Neville Chamberlain, Adolf Hitler	
A P R I L	29	The Spikes Gang	United Artists / Optimum Releasing	Richard Fleischer (director); Irving Ravetch, Harriet Frank Jr. (screenplay); Lee Marvin, Gary Grimes, Charles Martin Smith, Ron Howard, Arthur Hunnicutt, Noah Beery Jr., Marc Smith, Don Fellows, Elliott Sullivan	
M A Y	1	The Lords of Flatbush	Columbia Pictures	Martin Davidson, Stephen F. Verona (directors/screenplay); Gayle Gleckler, Sylvester Stallone (screenplay); Perry King, Sylvester Stallone, Henry Winkler, Susan Blakely, Paul Jabara, Martin Davidson, Joseph Stern, Dolph Sweet, Antonia Rey, Ray Sharkey, Geraldine Smith\	
M A Y	2	Frankenstein and the Monster from Hell	Paramount Pictures / Hammer Film Productions	Terence Fisher (director); John Elder (screenplay); Peter Cushing, Shane Briant, Madeline Smith, David Prowse, John Stratton	
M A Y	10	Symptoms	Bryanston Pictures	José Ramón Larraz (director/screenplay); Stanley Miller (screenplay); Angela Pleasence, Peter Vaughan, Lorna Heilbron, Nancy Nevinson, Michael Grady, Raymond Huntley, Ronald O'Neil, Marie-Paule Mailleux	
M A Y	15	Stavisky	Cinemation Industries	Alain Resnais (director); Jorge Semprún (screenplay); Jean-Paul Belmondo, François Périer, Anny Duperey, Michael Lonsdale, Roberto Bisacco, Claude Rich, Charles Boyer, Pierre Vernier, Jacques Spiesser, Michel Beaune, Niké Arrighi, Raymond Girard, Gigi Ballista, Yves Brainville, Niels Arestrup, François Leterrier, Gérard Depardieu, music by Stephen Sondheim	
M A Y	17	Alice in the Cities	Axiom Films	Wim Wenders (director/screenplay); Veith von Fürstenberg (screenplay); Rüdiger Vogler, Yella Rottländer, Lisa Kreuzer, Lois Moran, Sibylle Baier, Chuck Berry, Wim Wenders, Edda Köchl, Ernest Boehm, Sam Presti, Didi Petrikat, Hans Hirschmüller	
M A Y	17	The Black Windmill	Universal Pictures	Don Siegel (director); Clive Egleton (screenplay); Michael Caine, Donald Pleasence, Delphine Seyrig, Clive Revill, Janet Suzman, Joseph O'Conor, John Vernon, Joss Ackland, Catherine Schell, Denis Quilley, Edward Hardwicke, Paul Moss, Derek Newark, Maureen Pryor	
M A Y	17	Dirty Mary, Crazy Larry	20th Century Fox / Academy Pictures Corporation	John Hough (director); Leigh Chapman, Antonio Santean (screenplay); Peter Fonda, Susan George, Adam Roarke, Vic Morrow, Kenneth Tobey, Lynn Borden, Roddy McDowall, Adrianne Herman, James W. Gavin	
M A Y	17	That's Entertainment!	Metro-Goldwyn-Mayer	Jack Haley Jr. (director/screenplay); Frank Sinatra, Fred Astaire, Bing Crosby, Gene Kelly, Debbie Reynolds, Elizabeth Taylor, James Stewart, Peter Lawford, Liza Minnelli, June Allyson, Leon Ames, Kay Armen, Edward Arnold, Ethel Barrymore	
M A Y	17	People Toys	Cinemation Industries	Sean MacGregor (director); Dylan Jones (screenplay); Sorrell Booke, Gene Evans, Joan McCall, Shelley Morrison, Leif Garrett, Dawn Lyn, Tierre Turner, Henry Beckman, Taylor Lacher, Carolyn Stellar, John Durren, Gail Smale, Tia Thompson	
M A Y	19	Zandy's Bride	Warner Bros.	Jan Troell (director); Marc Norman (screenplay); Gene Hackman, Liv Ullmann, Eileen Heckart, Susan Tyrrell, Harry Dean Stanton, Joe Santos, Frank Cady, Sam Bottoms, Bob Simpson	
M A Y	20	The Driver's Seat	AVCO Embassy Pictures	Giuseppe Patroni Griffi (director/screenplay); Raffaele La Capria (screenplay); Elizabeth Taylor, Ian Bannen, Guido Mannari, Mona Washbourne, Luigi Squarzina, Maxence Mailfort, Andy Warhol	
M A Y	22	Chosen Survivors	Columbia Pictures / Metromedia Producers Corporation / Alpine Productions Inc. / Estudios Churubusco Azteca S.A.	Sutton Roley (director); H.B. Cross, Joe Reb Moffly (screenplay); Jackie Cooper, Alex Cord, Richard Jaeckel, Bradford Dillman, Pedro Armendáriz Jr., Diana Muldaur, Lincoln Kilpatrick, Barbara Babcock, Kelly Lange, Gwenn Mitchell, Cristina Moreno, Nancy Rodman	
M A Y	22	Daisy Miller	Paramount Pictures / The Directors Company	Peter Bogdanovich (director); Frederic Raphael (screenplay); Cybill Shepherd, Barry Brown, Cloris Leachman, Mildred Natwick, Eileen Brennan, James McMurtry, Duilio Del Prete, Nicholas Jones, George Morfogen	
M A Y	22	The Nickel Ride	20th Century Fox	Robert Mulligan (director); Eric Roth (screenplay); Jason Miller, Linda Haynes, Victor French, John Hillerman, Bo Hopkins, Richard Evans, Bart Burns, Lou Frizzell, Mark Gordon, Harvey Gold, Lee de Broux, Nelson Leigh	
M A Y	22	Thunderbolt and Lightfoot	United Artists / The Malpaso Company	Michael Cimino (director/screenplay); Clint Eastwood, Jeff Bridges, George Kennedy, Geoffrey Lewis, Catherine Bach, Gary Busey, Jack Dodson, Burton Gilliam, Roy Jenson	
M A Y	24	Huckleberry Finn	United Artists / APJAC Productions / Reader's Digest	J. Lee Thompson (director); Robert B. Sherman, Richard M. Sherman, Mark Twain (screenplay); Jeff East, Paul Winfield, Harvey Korman, David Wayne, Arthur O'Connell, Gary Merrill, Natalie Trundy, Lucille Benson, Kim O'Brien, Odessa Cleveland, Jean Fay, Ruby Leftwich	
M A Y	24	Welcome to Arrow Beach	Warner Bros. / Brut Productions	Laurence Harvey (director/screenplay); Jack Gross Jr. (screenplay); Laurence Harvey, Joanna Pettet, Stuart Whitman, John Ireland, Meg Foster, Gloria LeRoy, David Macklin, Dodie Heath, Altovise Davis, Robert Lussier, Jesse Vint, John Hart, Andy Romano, Florence Lake	
J U N E	6	Birds Do It, Bees Do It	Columbia Pictures / Wolper Productions	Nicolas Noxon (director/screenplay); Irwin Rosten (director); Lee Bergere	
J U N E	6	Bootleggers	Howco International Pictures	Charles B. Pierce (director); Earl E. Smith (screenplay); Paul Koslo, Dennis Fimple, Slim Pickens, Jaclyn Smith, Seamon Glass, Charles B. Pierce, Betty Bluett, Steve Ward, James Tennison, Steve Lyons, Buddy Ledwell, Chuck Pierce Jr.	
J U N E	6	Herbie Rides Again	Walt Disney Productions / Buena Vista Distribution	Robert Stevenson (director); Bill Walsh (screenplay); Helen Hayes, Ken Berry, Stefanie Powers, John McIntire, Keenan Wynn, Huntz Hall, Ivor Barry, Vito Scotti, Liam Dunn, Elaine Devry	
J U N E	9	Little Malcolm	Apple Films	Stuart Cooper (director); Derek Woodward (screenplay); John Hurt, Rosalind Ayres, John McEnery, Raymond Platt, David Warner	
J U N E	14	The Midnight Man	Universal Pictures / Norlan Productions	Roland Kibbee, Burt Lancaster (directors/screenplay); Burt Lancaster, Susan Clark, Cameron Mitchell, Morgan Woodward, Harris Yulin, Robert Quarry	
J U N E	14	The Parallax View	Paramount Pictures	Alan J. Pakula (director); David Giler, Lorenzo Semple Jr. (screenplay); Warren Beatty, Hume Cronyn, William Daniels, Paula Prentiss, Kenneth Mars, Walter McGinn, Kelly Thordsen, Jim Davis	
J U N E	20	Chinatown	Paramount Pictures / Long Road Productions / Robert Evans Company	Roman Polanski (director); Robert Towne (screenplay); Jack Nicholson, Faye Dunaway, John Huston, John Hillerman, Perry Lopez, Burt Young, Darrell Zwerling, Diane Ladd, Roy Jenson, Roman Polanski, Dick Bakalyan, Joe Mantell, Bruce Glover, James Hong, Beulah Quo	
J U N E	21	The Terminal Man	Warner Bros.	Mike Hodges (director/screenplay); George Segal, Joan Hackett, Richard Dysart, Norman Burton, Jill Clayburgh, Donald Moffat, Michael C. Gwynne, William Hansen, James B. Sikking, Matt Clark, Jim Antonio, Burke Byrnes	
J U N E	21	Where the Red Fern Grows	Crown International Pictures / Doty-Dayton Productions	Norman Tokar (director); Douglas C. Stewart, Eleanor Lamb (screenplay); James Whitmore, Beverly Garland, Jack Ging, Lonny Chapman, Stewart Petersen, Bill Dunbar, Marshall Edwards	
J U N E	23	The Groove Tube	Levitt-Pickman	Ken Shapiro (director/screenplay); Lane Sarasohn, Rich Allen (screenplay); Ken Shapiro, Richard Belzer, Chevy Chase	
J U N E	26	The Nine Lives of Fritz the Cat	American International Pictures / Steve Krantz Productions / Cine Camera	Robert Taylor (director/screenplay); Fred Halliday, Eric Monte (screenplay); Skip Hinnant, Reva Rose, Bob Holt, Peter Leeds	
J U N E	26	For Pete's Sake	Columbia Pictures / Rastar	Peter Yates (director); Stanley Shapiro, Maurice Richlin (screenplay); Barbra Streisand, Michael Sarrazin, Estelle Parsons, William Redfield, Molly Picon, Louis Zorich, Heywood Hale Broun, Richard Ward, Ed Bakey	
J U N E	26	Three the Hard Way	Allied Artists Pictures Corporation	Gordon Parks Jr. (director); Eric Bercovici, Jerrold L. Ludwig (screenplay); Jim Brown, Fred Williamson, Jim Kelly, Sheila Frazier, Jay Robinson, Charles McGregor, Howard Platt, Pamela Serpe, Marian Collier, Alex Rocco, Corbin Bernsen	
J U N E	26	Truck Turner	American International Pictures / Sequoia Pictures, Inc.	Jonathan Kaplan (director); Michael Allin, Oscar Williams (screenplay); Isaac Hayes, Yaphet Kotto, Annazette Chase, Nichelle Nichols, Paul Harris, Charles Cyphers, Scatman Crothers, Dick Miller, Edna Richardson, Stan Shaw	
J U N E	28	The Gravy Train	Columbia Pictures	Jack Starrett (director); Bill Kerby, David Whitney (screenplay); Stacy Keach, Frederic Forrest, Margot Kidder, Barry Primus, Richard Romanus, Denny Miller, Clay Tanner, Robert Phillips, Claude Ennis Starrett Jr., Paul Dooley, Lorna Thayer, Chino 'Fats' Williams	
J U N E	28	S*P*Y*S	20th Century Fox / American Film Properties; Dymphana	Irvin Kershner (director); Malcolm Marmorstein, Lawrence J. Cohen, Fred Freeman (screenplay); Elliott Gould, Donald Sutherland, Zouzou, Joss Ackland, Xavier Gélin, Vladek Sheybal, Shane Rimmer, Kenneth Griffith, Kenneth J. Warren	
J U N E	28	W	Cinerama Releasing Corporation / Bing Crosby Productions	Richard Quine (director); Gerald Di Pego, James Kelley (screenplay); Twiggy, Dirk Benedict, Michael Witney, Eugene Roche, John Vernon, Michael Conrad, Alfred Ryder, Carmen Zapata, Dave Morick, Ken Lynch	

== July–September ==
Opening		Title	Production company	Cast and crew	Ref.
J U L Y	8	Down and Dirty Duck	New World Pictures / Murakami-Wolf	Charles Swenson (director/screenplay); Howard Kaylan, Mark Volman, Robert Ridgely, Walker Edmiston, Lurene Tuttle, Aynsley Dunbar, Cynthia Adler, Joëlle Le Quément, Jerry D. Good	
J U L Y	10	Oliver Twist	Warner Bros.	Hal Sutherland (director); Ben Starr, Alan Dinehart (screenplay); Josh Albee, Phil Clark, Cathleen Cordell, Michael Evans, Lola Fisher, Robert Holt, Davy Jones, Larry D. Mann, Dallas McKennon, Billy Simpson, Larry Storch, Les Tremayne, Jane Webb, Helene Winston	
J U L Y	12	Carry On Dick	The Rank Organisation	Gerald Thomas (director); Talbot Rothwell (screenplay); Sid James, Barbara Windsor, Kenneth Williams, Hattie Jacques, Bernard Bresslaw, Joan Sims, Kenneth Connor, Peter Butterworth, Jack Douglas	
J U L Y	12	Mr. Majestyk	United Artists / The Mirisch Corporation	Richard Fleischer (director); Elmore Leonard (screenplay); Charles Bronson, Al Lettieri, Linda Cristal, Lee Purcell, Paul Koslo, Frank Maxwell, Alejandro Rey, Richard Erdman, James Reynolds, Taylor Lacher, Jordan Rhodes, Bert Santos	
J U L Y	12	The Take	Columbia Pictures / World Film Services	Robert Hartford-Davis (director); Franklin Coen, Del Reisman (screenplay); Billy Dee Williams, Eddie Albert, Frankie Avalon, Sorrell Booke, Tracy Reed, Albert Salmi, Vic Morrow, A Martinez, James Luisi, Kathrine Baumann, John Davis Chandler	
J U L Y	17	The Mad Adventures of Rabbi Jacob	20th Century Fox / SNC	Gérard Oury (director/screenplay); Danièle Thompson, Josy Eisenberg, Roberto de Leonardis (screenplay); Louis de Funès, Suzy Delair, Claude Giraud, Henri Guybet	
J U L Y	17	My Name Is Nobody	Titanus / Rafran Cinematografica / Les Filmes Jacques Leitienne / La Societe Im. Ex. Ci. / La Societe Alcinter / Rialto Film Preben Philpsen	Tonino Valerii (director); Ernesto Gastaldi (screenplay); Terence Hill, Henry Fonda	
J U L Y	17	The Education of Sonny Carson	Paramount Pictures	Michael Campus (director); Sonny Carson, Fred Hudson (screenplay); Rony Clanton, Don Gordon, Joyce Walker, Paul Benjamin, Mary Alice, Ram John Holder, Roger Hill	
J U L Y	17	Golden Needles	American International Pictures	Robert Clouse (director); S. Lee Pogostin, Sylvia Schneble (screenplay); Joe Don Baker, Elizabeth Ashley, Ann Sothern, Jim Kelly, Burgess Meredith, Roy Chiao, Frances Fong, Pat E. Johnson, Richard Ng, Kung-Wu Huang, Alice Fong, Sonny Barnes, Edgar Justice	
J U L Y	21	The White Dawn	Paramount Pictures / American Film Properties / Filmways	Philip Kaufman (director); James Houston, Thomas Rickman (screenplay); Warren Oates, Timothy Bottoms, Louis Gossett Jr.	
J U L Y	24	Death Wish	Paramount Pictures / Dino De Laurentiis Corporation	Michael Winner (director); Wendell Mayes (screenplay); Charles Bronson, Vincent Gardenia, William Redfield, Hope Lange, Chris Gampel, Steven Keats, Stuart Margolin	
J U L Y	24	Gone in 60 Seconds	H.B. Halicki Junkyard and Mercantile Company	H.B. Halicki (director/screenplay); H.B. "Toby" Halicki, Christopher J.C. Agajanian, Gary Bettenhausen, Parnelli Jones, Terence H. Winkless, Phil Woods, Wally Burr	
J U L Y	24	The Internecine Project	British Lion / MacLean and Co / Hemisphere Productions / Lion International	Ken Hughes (director); Barry Levinson, Jonathan Lynn (screenplay); James Coburn, Lee Grant, Harry Andrews, Ian Hendry, Michael Jayston, Christiane Krüger, Keenan Wynn, Terence Alexander, Julian Glover, Philip Anthony, Mary Larkin	
J U L Y	26	Born to Kill	New World Pictures / Artists Entertainment Complex / Rio Pinto Productions	Monte Hellman (director); Charles Willeford (screenplay); Warren Oates, Richard B. Shull, Harry Dean Stanton, Patricia Pearcy, Millie Perkins, Ed Begley Jr., Laurie Bird	
J U L Y	26	Uptown Saturday Night	Warner Bros. / First Artists	Sidney Poitier (director); Richard Wesley (screenplay); Sidney Poitier, Bill Cosby, Harry Belafonte, Flip Wilson, Richard Pryor, Paula Kelly, Rosalind Cash, Roscoe Lee Browne	
J U L Y	31	Bank Shot	United Artists / Landers-Roberts Productions	Gower Champion (director); Wendell Mayes (screenplay); George C. Scott, Joanna Cassidy, Sorrell Booke, G. Wood, Don Calfa, Bibi Osterwald, Frank McRae, Bob Balaban, Clifton James, Liam Dunn	
J U L Y	31	The Bears and I	Walt Disney Productions / Buena Vista Distribution	Bernard McEveety (director); John Whedon (screenplay); Patrick Wayne, Chief Dan George, Andrew Duggan, Michael Ansara, Robert Pine, Valentin de Vargas, Hal Baylor	
A U G U S T	2	The Castaway Cowboy	Walt Disney Productions / Buena Vista Distribution	Vincent McEveety (director); Don Tait (screenplay); James Garner, Vera Miles, Eric Shea, Robert Culp, Manu Tupou, Gregory Sierra, Shug Fisher, Nephi Hannemann, Kim Kahana, Buddy Joe Hooker	
A U G U S T	7	California Split	Columbia Pictures / Spelling-Goldberg Productions / Won World	Robert Altman (director); Joseph Walsh (screenplay); George Segal, Elliott Gould, Ann Prentiss, Gwen Welles, Edward Walsh, Joseph Walsh, Bert Remsen, Jeff Goldblum, Barbara Ruick, Barbara Colby, Jack Riley	
A U G U S T	7	Together Brothers	20th Century Fox	William A. Graham (director); Jack DeWitt, Joe Greene (screenplay); Ahmad Nurradin, Anthony Wilson, Nelson Sims, Kenneth Bell, Owen Pace, Kim Dorsey, Ed Bernard, Lincoln Kilpatrick, Glynn Turman, Richard Yniguez	
A U G U S T	8	Macon County Line	American International Pictures	Richard Compton (director/screenplay); Max Baer Jr. (screenplay); Alan Vint, Jesse Vint, Cheryl Waters, Max Baer Jr., Geoffrey Lewis, Joan Blackman	
A U G U S T	12	Harry and Tonto	20th Century Fox	Paul Mazursky (director/screenplay); Josh Greenfeld (screenplay); Art Carney, Herbert Berghof, Philip Bruns, Ellen Burstyn, Geraldine Fitzgerald, Larry Hagman, Chief Dan George, Melanie Mayron, Josh Mostel	
A U G U S T	14	Bring Me the Head of Alfredo Garcia	United Artists / Optimus Films / Estudios Churubusco	Sam Peckinpah (director/screenplay); Gordon Dawson (screenplay); Warren Oates, Isela Vega, Robert Webber, Gig Young	
A U G U S T	15	11 Harrowhouse	20th Century Fox	Aram Avakian (director); Charles Grodin (screenplay); Charles Grodin, Candice Bergen, James Mason, Trevor Howard, John Gielgud, Helen Cherry, Peter Vaughan, Cyril Shaps, Leon Greene, Jack Watson, Jack Watling, Clive Morton, Larry Cross, John Siddall	
A U G U S T	18	Act of Vengeance	American International Pictures	Bob Kelljan (director); David Kidd, H.R. Christian (screenplay); Jo Ann Harris, Peter Brown, Lada Edmund Jr., Tony Young	
A U G U S T	21	Buster and Billie	Columbia Pictures / Black Creek Billie	Daniel Petrie (director); Ron Turbeville (screenplay); Jan-Michael Vincent, Pamela Sue Martin, Clifton James, Robert Englund, Joan Goodfellow	
A U G U S T	21	The Longest Yard (New York)	Paramount Pictures / Albert S. Ruddy Productions / Long Road Productions	Robert Aldrich (director); Tracy Keenan Wynn (screenplay); Burt Reynolds, Eddie Albert, Ed Lauter, Michael Conrad, James Hampton,	
A U G U S T	21	Newman's Law	Universal Pictures	Richard T. Heffron (director); Anthony Wilson (screenplay); George Peppard, Roger Robinson, Eugene Roche, Gordon Pinsent, Abe Vigoda, Louis Zorich, Michael Lerner, Mel Stewart	
A U G U S T	22	The Girl from Petrovka	Universal Pictures / KMA	Robert Ellis Miller (director); Chris Bryant, Allan Scott (screenplay); Goldie Hawn, Hal Holbrook, Anthony Hopkins, Grégoire Aslan, Anton Dolin	
A U G U S T	30	99 and 44/100% Dead	20th Century Fox	John Frankenheimer (director); Robert Dillon (screenplay); Richard Harris, Edmond O'Brien, Bradford Dillman, Chuck Connors, Ann Turkel, Constance Ford, Kathrine Baumann, Karl Lukas, Roy Jenson, David Hall, Janis Heiden, Max Kleven, Anthony Brubaker, Jerry Summers	
A U G U S T	30	Amazing Grace	United Artists / Coleridge-Taylor Perkinson	Stan Lathan (director); Matt Robinson (screenplay); Moms Mabley, Slappy White, Rosalind Cash, Moses Gunn, James Karen	
S E P T E M B E R	3	The Black Godfather	Cinemation Industries	John Evans (director/screenplay); Rod Perry, Don Chastain, Jimmy Witherspoon, Diane Sommerfield, Duncan McLeod, Damu King	
S E P T E M B E R	5	Gold	Allied Artists / Hemdale Film Distribution Ltd.	Peter R. Hunt (director); Stanley Price, Wilbur Smith (screenplay); Roger Moore, Susannah York, Ray Milland, Bradford Dillman, John Gielgud, Tony Beckley, Bernard Horsfall	
S E P T E M B E R	6	Phase IV	Paramount Pictures / PBR Productions / Alced Productions	Saul Bass (director); Mayo Simon (screenplay); Michael Murphy, Nigel Davenport, Lynne Frederick, Alan Gifford, Robert Henderson, Helen Horton, David Healy	
S E P T E M B E R	13	Homebodies	AVCO Embassy Pictures / Cinema Entertainment	Larry Yust (director/screenplay); Howard Kaminsky, Bennett Sims (screenplay); Peter Brocco, Frances Fuller, William Hansen, Ruth McDevitt, Paula Trueman, Ian Wolfe, Linda Marsh, Douglas Fowley	
S E P T E M B E R	14	The Dove	Paramount Pictures	Charles Jarrott (director); Peter S. Beagle, Adam Kennedy (screenplay); Joseph Bottoms, Deborah Raffin, John McLiam, Dabney Coleman, John Anderson, John Meillon, Garth Meade, Cecily Polson	
S E P T E M B E R	19	Big Bad Mama	New World Pictures	Steve Carver (director); William Norton, Frances Doel (screenplay); Angie Dickinson, William Shatner, Tom Skerritt, Noble Willingham, Sally Kirkland, Dick Miller, Joan Prather, Royal Dano, William O'Connell, John Wheeler	
S E P T E M B E R	20	Nightmare Honeymoon	Metro-Goldwyn-Mayer	Elliot Silverstein (director); Lawrence Block, S. Lee Pogostin (screenplay); Dack Rambo, Rebecca Dianna Smith, John Beck, Pat Hingle, Roy Jenson, David Huddleston, Jay Robinson, Dennis Patrick, Jim Boles, Dennis Burkley, Patrick Cranshaw	
S E P T E M B E R	25	The Mutations	Columbia Pictures / Cyclone / Getty Pictures Corp.	Jack Cardiff (director); Edward Mann, Robert D. Weinbach (screenplay); Donald Pleasence, Tom Baker, Brad Harris, Julie Ege, Michael Dunn, Scott Antony, Jill Haworth, Eithne Dunne, Richard Davies, Olga Anthony, Lisa Collings, Joan Scott, Toby Lennon, John Wreford	
S E P T E M B E R	25	Juggernaut	United Artists / Two Roads	Richard Lester (director); Richard DeKoker, Alan Plater (screenplay); Richard Harris, Omar Sharif, David Hemmings, Anthony Hopkins, Shirley Knight, Ian Holm, Clifton James	
S E P T E M B E R	29	11 Harrowhouse	20th Century Fox	Aram Avakian (director); Charles Grodin (screenplay); Charles Grodin, Candice Bergen, James Mason, Trevor Howard, John Gielgud, Helen Cherry, Peter Vaughan, Cyril Shaps, Leon Greene, Jack Watson, Jack Watling, Clive Morton, Larry Cross, John Siddall	

== October–December ==
Opening		Title	Production company	Cast and crew	Ref.
O C T O B E R	1	The House on Skull Mountain	20th Century Fox	Ron Honthaner (director); Mildred Pares (screenplay); Victor French, Janee Michelle, Mike Evans, Xernona Clayton, Leroy Johnson, Jean Durand, Ella Woods, Lloyd Nelson, Mary J. Todd McKenzie, Don Devendorf, Jo Marie, Ray Bonner, O.J. Harris	
O C T O B E R	1	The Texas Chain Saw Massacre (Austin, hometown of its director, Tobe Hooper, with Los Angeles and New York City on the 30th.)	Bryanston Distributing Company / Vortex	Tobe Hooper (director/screenplay); Kim Henkel (screenplay); Marilyn Burns, Allen Danziger, Paul A. Partain, William Vail, Teri McMinn, Edwin Neal, Jim Siedow, Gunnar Hansen, John Dugan, John Larroquette, Robert Courtin, William Creamer, John Henry Faulk, Jerry Green, Ed Guinn, Joe Bill Hogan, Perry Lorenz	
O C T O B E R	2	The Gambler	Paramount Pictures / Chartoff-Winkler Productions, Inc.	Karel Reisz (director); James Toback (screenplay); James Caan, Paul Sorvino, Lauren Hutton, Morris Carnovsky, Jacqueline Brookes, Burt Young, Carmine Caridi	
O C T O B E R	2	The Taking of Pelham One Two Three	United Artists / Palomar Pictures / Palladium Productions	Joseph Sargent (director); Peter Stone (screenplay); Walter Matthau, Robert Shaw, Martin Balsam, Héctor Elizondo, Earl Hindman, James Broderick, Dick O'Neill, Lee Wallace	
O C T O B E R	4	Female Trouble	New Line Cinema / Dreamland / Saliva Films	John Waters (director/screenplay); Divine, David Lochary, Mary Vivian Pearce, Mink Stole, Edith Massey, Cookie Mueller, Susan Walsh, Michael Potter, Ed Peranio, Paul Swift, George Figgs, Susan Lowe, Channing Wilroy, Elizabeth Coffey, Hilary Taylor	
O C T O B E R	9	Law and Disorder	Columbia Pictures / Palomar Pictures / Memorial Enterprises / Leroy Street	Ivan Passer (director/screenplay); Kenneth Harris Fishman, William Richert (screenplay); Carroll O'Connor, Ernest Borgnine, Ann Wedgeworth, Leslie Ackerman, Karen Black, Jack Kehoe, David Spielberg, Pat Corley, Allan Arbus, Rita Gam, Michael Medwin, Joe Ragno, Anita Dangler, Lionel Pena	
O C T O B E R	9	Shanks	Paramount Pictures	William Castle (director); Ranald Graham (screenplay); Marcel Marceau, Tsilla Chelton, Philippe Clay, Cindy Eilbacher, Helena Kallianiotes, Larry Bishop, Don Calfa, Biff Manard	
O C T O B E R	10	The Cars That Ate Paris (Australia)	British Empire Films / Australian Film Development Corporation / Royce Smeal Film Productions / Salt Pan Films	Peter Weir (director/screenplay); John Meillon, Terry Camilleri, Chris Haywood, Bruce Spence, Max Gillies, Edward Howell, Max Phipps, Melissa Jaffer, Kevin Miles, Rick Scully, Peter Armstrong, Joe Burrow, Deryck Barnes, Jack Ellerton	
O C T O B E R	11	Black Christmas (Canada)	Ambassador Film Distributors / Canadian Film Development Corporation / Film Funding Ltd.	Bob Clark (director); A. Roy Moore (screenplay); Olivia Hussey, Keir Dullea, Margot Kidder, John Saxon, Andrea Martin, Doug McGrath, Art Hindle, Lynne Griffin, Leslie Carlson, Martha Gibson, Nick Mancuso, Bob Clark, Marian Waldman, James Edmond, Michael Rapport, John Rutter, Dave Clement, Julian Reed, Albert J. Dunk	
O C T O B E R	17	Benji	Mulberry Square Releasing	Joe Camp (director/screenplay); Peter Breck, Christopher Connelly, Patsy Garrett, Tom Lester, Mark Slade, Herb Vigran, Deborah Walley, Frances Bavier, Edgar Buchanan, Terry Carter, Higgins, Cynthia Smith, Allen Fiuzat, Larry Swartz	
O C T O B E R	18	Airport 1975	Universal Pictures	Jack Smight (director); Don Ingalls (screenplay); Charlton Heston, Karen Black, George Kennedy, Gloria Swanson, Efrem Zimbalist Jr., Susan Clark, Sid Caesar, Linda Blair, Dana Andrews, Roy Thinnes	
O C T O B E R	18	It's Alive	Warner Bros.	Larry Cohen (director/screenplay); John P. Ryan, Sharon Farrell, William Wellman Jr., Andrew Duggan, Guy Stockwell, Michael Ansara, Robert Emhardt, James Dixon, Shamus Locke, Daniel Holzman	
O C T O B E R	18	The Crazy World of Julius Vrooder	20th Century Fox / Playboy Enterprises	Arthur Hiller (director); Daryl Henry (screenplay); Timothy Bottoms, Barbara Seagull, George Marshall, Lawrence Pressman, Albert Salmi, Richard Dysart, Dena Dietrich, Michael Ivan Cristofer, Jack Colvin, Andrew Duncan, Jack Murdock, Lou Frizzell, Jarion Monroe, William Lucking, Debralee Scott, DeWayne Jessie, Lois Foraker, Ron Glass	
O C T O B E R	18	The Odessa File	Columbia Pictures / John Woolf Productions / Domino Productions / Oceanic Filmproduktion	Ronald Neame (director); Kenneth Ross, George Markstein (screenplay); Jon Voight, Mary Tamm, Maximilian Schell, Maria Schell, Derek Jacobi, Peter Jeffrey, Klaus Löwitsch, Kurt Meisel, Hannes Messemer, Garfield Morgan, Shmuel Rodensky, Ernst Schröder, Günter Strack, Noel Willman, Günter Meisner, Gunnar Möller, Cyril Shaps, Oskar Werner	
O C T O B E R	18	Mixed Company	United Artists / Llenroc Productions	Melville Shavelson (director/screenplay); Mort Lachman (screenplay); Barbara Harris, Joseph Bologna, Tom Bosley, Lisa Gerritsen, Dorothy Shay, Ruth McDevitt, Haywood Nelson, Al McCoy, Arianne Heller, Stephen Honanie, Eric Olson, Jina Tan, Bob G. Anthony, Roger Price, Keith Hamilton, Calvin Brown, Ron McIlwan	
O C T O B E R	18	A Woman Under the Influence (New York Film Festival)	Faces Distribution	John Cassavetes (director/screenplay); Gena Rowlands, Peter Falk, Fred Draper, Lady Rowlands, Katherine Cassavetes, Matthew Labyorteaux, Mario Gallo, John Finnegan, Frank Richards, Hugh Hurd, Leon Wagner, Dominique Davalos, Xan Cassavetes, N.J. Cassavetes, Matthew Cassel, Christina Grisanti, Eddie Shaw, Charles Horvath, James Joyce	
O C T O B E R	24	Mahler	Visual Programme Systems Ltd.	Ken Russell (director/screenplay); Robert Powell, Georgina Hale, Lee Montague, Miriam Karlin, Rosalie Crutchley, Richard Morant, Angela Down, Ronald Pickup, Peter Eyre, Dana Gillespie, George Coulouris, David Collings, Arnold Yarrow, Elaine Delmar, Benny Lee, Andrew Faulds, Kenneth Colley, Oliver Reed, Antonia Ellis, David Trevena, Otto Diamant, Michael Southgate, Sarah McClellan, Claire McClellan, Gary Rich	
O C T O B E R	24	Stardust	Anglo-EMI Film Distributors	Michael Apted (director); Ray Connolly (screenplay); David Essex, Adam Faith, Larry Hagman, Keith Moon, Ines Des Longchamps, Rosalind Ayres, Marty Wilde, Charlotte Cornwell, Edd Byrnes, Dave Edmunds, Paul Nicholas, Karl Howman, Richard LeParmentier, Peter Duncan, John Normington, James Hazeldine, David Daker, David Jacobs, Ray Winstone	
O C T O B E R	25	The Klansman	Paramount Pictures	Terence Young (director); Millard Kaufman, Samuel Fuller (screenplay); Lee Marvin, Richard Burton, Cameron Mitchell, O. J. Simpson, Lola Falana, David Huddleston, Linda Evans, Luciana Paluzzi, David Ladd, John Alderson, John Pearce, Virgil Frye, Larry Williams	
O C T O B E R	31	Phantom of the Paradise	20th Century Fox / Harbor Productions	Brian De Palma (director/screenplay); Paul Williams, William Finley, Jessica Harper, Gerrit Graham, Raymond Louis Kennedy, George Memmoli, Archie Hahn, Jeffrey Comanor, Peter Elbling, Rod Serling, Janus Blythe, Mary Margaret Amato, Cheryl Smith	
O C T O B E R	31	The Four Musketeers	Fox-Rank	Richard Lester (director); George MacDonald Fraser (screenplay); Oliver Reed, Raquel Welch, Richard Chamberlain, Michael York, Frank Finlay, Christopher Lee, Geraldine Chaplin, Jean-Pierre Cassel, Simon Ward, Faye Dunaway, Charlton Heston, Roy Kinnear, Michael Gothard, Sybil Danning, Nicole Calfan	
O C T O B E R	31	The Savage Is Loose	Campbell Devon Films / The Savage Is Loose Company	George C. Scott (director); Max Ehrlich, Frank De Felitta (screenplay); George C. Scott, Trish Van Devere, John David Carson, Lee H. Montgomery	
N O V E M B E R	1	Open Season	Columbia Pictures / Arpa Productions / Impala	Peter Collinson (director); David Osborn, Liz Charles-Williams (screenplay); Peter Fonda, Cornelia Sharpe, John Phillip Law, Richard Lynch, Alberto de Mendoza, William Holden, May Heatherly	
N O V E M B E R	6	Blood for Dracula	Euro International Films / Compagnia Cinematografica Champion	Paul Morrissey (director/screenplay); Joe Dallesandro, Udo Kier, Vittorio de Sica, Maxime McKendry, Arno Juerging, Milena Vukotic, Dominique Darel, Stefania Casini, Silvia Dionisio, Roman Polanski	
N O V E M B E R	7	The Little Prince	Paramount Pictures / Stanley Donen Films	Stanley Donen (director); Alan Jay Lerner (screenplay); Richard Kiley, Bob Fosse, Steven Warner, Gene Wilder, Donna McKechnie, Joss Ackland, Graham Crowden, Victor Spinetti, Clive Revill	
N O V E M B E R	8	Confessions of a Window Cleaner	Columbia Pictures	Val Guest (director/screenplay); Christopher Wood (screenplay); Robin Askwith, Antony Booth, Linda Hayden, Sheila White, Dandy Nichols	
N O V E M B E R	12	All the Kind Strangers	ABC / Cinemation Industries	Burt Kennedy (director); Clyde Ware (screenplay); Stacy Keach, Samantha Eggar, John Savage, Robby Benson, Arlene Farber, Tim Parkison, Patti Parkison, Brent Campbell, John Connell	
N O V E M B E R	13	The Life and Times of Grizzly Adams	Sunn Classic Pictures / Sun International	Richard Friedenberg (director); Lawrence Dobkin (screenplay); Dan Haggerty, Don Shanks, William Woodson, Lisa Jones, Marjorie Harper	
N O V E M B E R	13	The Trial of Billy Jack	Warner Bros. / Taylor-Laughlin	Tom Laughlin (director); Frank Christina, Teresa Christina (screenplay); Tom Laughlin, Delores Taylor, Riley Hall, Sacheen Littlefeather, Bong-Soo Han, Rolling Thunder, William Wellman Jr., Victor Izay, Teresa Kelly, Sara Lane, Geo Anne Sosa, Lynn Baker, Sparky Watt, Gus Greymountain, Michael Bolland, Jack Stanley	
N O V E M B E R	15	The Abdication	Warner Bros.	Anthony Harvey (director); Ruth Wolff (screenplay); Peter Finch, Liv Ullmann, Cyril Cusack, Paul Rogers, Graham Crowden, Michael Dunn, Kathleen Byron, Lewis Fiander, Harold Goldblatt, Tony Steedman, James Faulkner, Edward Underdown, Noel Trevarthen, Richard Cornish, Ania Marson, Franz Dargo, Suzanne Huddart, Debbie Nicholson	
N O V E M B E R	15	Earthquake	Universal Pictures / The Filmakers Group	Mark Robson (director); George Fox, Mario Puzo (screenplay); Charlton Heston, Ava Gardner, George Kennedy, Lorne Greene, Geneviève Bujold, Richard Roundtree, Marjoe Gortner, Barry Sullivan, Lloyd Nolan, Victoria Principal, Walter Matthau, Monica Lewis, Gabriel Dell, Pedro Armendáriz Jr., Lloyd Gough, John Randolph, Kip Niven, Scott Hylands, Donald Moffat, Jesse Vint, Alan Vint, John S. Ragin, George Murdock, Donald Mantooth, Gene Dynarski, H.B. Haggerty, Tim Herbert, David S. Cass Sr., Lonny Chapman, Sam Chew Jr., Jeannie Epper, Gwen Farrell, Bruce M. Fischer, Jerry Hardin, Bert Kramer, Karl Lukas, Stuart Nisbet, Arthur Tovey, Dick Tufeld, Sandy Ward, Dick Warlock, Don Wilbanks, Tiger Williams, Michael Richardson, John Elerick	
N O V E M B E R	15	Lenny	United Artists	Bob Fosse (director); Julian Barry (screenplay); Dustin Hoffman, Valerie Perrine, Jan Miner, Stanley Beck, Gary Morton, Rashel Novikoff, Guy Rennie, Aldo Demeo	
N O V E M B E R	15	Seizure	American International Pictures / Cinerama Releasing Corporation	Oliver Stone (director/screenplay); Edward Mann (screenplay); Jonathan Frid, Martine Beswick, Hervé Villechaize, Henry Judd Baker, Joseph Sirola, Christina Pickles, Troy Donahue, Mary Woronov, Richard Cox, Alexis Kirk	
N O V E M B E R	21	Beyond the Door	Variety Distribution / A Erre Cinematografica / Montoro Productions Ltd.	Ovidio G. Assonitis, Roberto Piazzoli (directors/screenplay); Antonio Troisio, Giorgio Marini, Aldo Crudo, Alex Rebar, Christopher Cruise (screenplay); Juliet Mills, Gabriele Lavia, Richard Johnson, Carla Mancini, Edward L. Montoro, Nino Segurini, Elisabeth Turner, Barbara Fiorini, David Colin Jr., Jonathan T. Tran	
N O V E M B E R	22	Animals Are Beautiful People	Warner Bros.	Jamie Uys (director/screenplay); Paddy O'Byrne	
N O V E M B E R	22	Great Expectations	ITC Entertainment / Transcontinental Film Productions	Joseph Hardy (director); Sherman Yellen (screenplay); Michael York, Sarah Miles, James Mason, Margaret Leighton, Robert Morley, Anthony Quayle, Joss Ackland, Rachel Roberts, Andrew Ray, Heather Sears, Simon Gipps-Kent, James Faulkner, Peter Bull, John Clive, Patsy Smart, Maria Charles	
N O V E M B E R	22	The Tamarind Seed	AVCO Embassy Pictures / Lorimar / ITC Entertainment / Jewel Productions / Pimlico Films	Blake Edwards (director/screenplay); Julie Andrews, Omar Sharif, Anthony Quayle, Dan O'Herlihy, Sylvia Sims, Oskar Homolka, Bryan Marshall, Celia Bannerman, Sharon Duce, George Mikell, Kate O'Mara, Constantine Gregory, Janet Henfrey, David Baron, Roger Dann, John Sullivan, Terence Plummer, Leslie Crawford, Alexei Jawdokimov	
N O V E M B E R	22	A Woman Under the Influence	Faces Distribution	John Cassavetes (director/screenplay); Gena Rowlands, Peter Falk, Fred Draper, Lady Rowlands, Katherine Cassavetes, Matthew Labyorteaux, Mario Gallo, John Finnegan, Frank Richards, Hugh Hurd, Leon Wagner, Dominique Davalos, Xan Cassavetes, N.J. Cassavetes, Matthew Cassel, Christina Grisanti, Eddie Shaw, Charles Horvath, James Joyce	
N O V E M B E R	29	The Phantom of Liberty	20th Century Fox / Greenwich Film Productions	Luis Buñuel (director/screenplay); Jean-Claude Carrière (screenplay); Adriana Asti, Julien Bertheau, Jean Rochefort, Jean-Claude Brialy, Michel Piccoli, Adolfo Celi, Anne-Marie Deschodt, Paul Frankeur, Pierre Lary, Michael Lonsdale, Pierre Maguelon, François Maistre, Hélène Perdrière, Claude Piéplu, Bernard Verley, Monica Vitti, Marie-France Pisier, Milena Vukotic, Guy Montagné, Marcel Pérès, Paul Le Person, Bernard Musson, Chantal Ladesou	
N O V E M B E R	29	Murder on the Orient Express	Paramount Pictures	Sidney Lumet (director); Paul Dehn (screenplay); Albert Finney, Lauren Bacall, Martin Balsam, Ingrid Bergman, Jacqueline Bisset, Jean-Pierre Cassel, Sean Connery, John Gielgud, Wendy Hiller, Anthony Perkins, Vanessa Redgrave, Rachel Roberts, Richard Widmark, Michael York, Colin Blakely, George Coulouris, Denis Quilley, Vernon Dobtcheff, Jeremy Lloyd, John Moffatt	
N O V E M B E R	29	The Land That Time Forgot	American International Pictures / Amicus Productions	Kevin Connor (director); Michael Moorcock, James Cawthorn (screenplay); Doug McClure, John McEnery, Susan Penhaligon, Keith Barron, Anthony Ainley, Godfrey James, Declan Mulholland, Roy Holder, Andrew McCulloch, Ron Pember, Brian Hall, Peter Sproule, Steve James	
D E C E M B E R	3	Emmanuelle	Parafrance Films / Trinacra Films / Orphée Productions	Just Jaeckin (director); Jean-Louis Richard (screenplay); Alain Cuny, Sylvia Kristel, Marika Green, Christine Boisson, Daniel Sarky, Jeanne Colletin, Gabriel Briand, Samantha	
D E C E M B E R	3	The Marseille Contract	American International Pictures / Kettledrum Films	Robert Parrish (director); Judd Bernard (screenplay); Michael Caine, Anthony Quinn, James Mason, Maurice Ronet, Alexandra Stewart, Maureen Kerwin, Catherine Rouvel, Marcel Bozzuffi, André Oumansky	
D E C E M B E R	3	Soft Beds, Hard Battles	The Rank Organisation	Roy Boulting (director/screenplay); Leo Marks (screenplay); Peter Sellers, Lila Kedrova, Curd Jürgens, Béatrice Romand, Jenny Hanley, Gabriella Licudi, Françoise Pascal, Rula Lenska, Vernon Dobtcheff, Doug Sheldon, Thorley Walters, Timothy West, Philip Madoc, Patricia Burke, Basil Dignam, Stanley Lebor, Gertan Klauber, Windsor Davies, Nicholas Courtney, Rex Stallings, Daphne Lawson, Hylette Adolphe, Jean Charles Driant, Nicholas Loukes, Barry J. Gordon, Joan Baxter, Carolle Rousseau	
D E C E M B E R	5	The Photographer	Embassy Pictures / Intro Media Productions Inc. / Destiny Worldwide Entertainment	William Byron Hillman (director/screenplay); Michael Callan, Barbara Nichols, Harold J. Stone, Edward Andrews, Jed Allan, Spencer Milligan, Susan Damante, Liv Lindeland, Jennifer Leak, Isabel Sanford, Patty Bodeen, Betty Anne Rees, Ronda Copland, Rai Bartonious, Billy Hillman	
D E C E M B E R	9	Alice Doesn't Live Here Anymore	Warner Bros.	Martin Scorsese (director); Robert Getchell (screenplay); Ellen Burstyn, Kris Kristofferson, Alfred Lutter, Billy "Green" Bush, Diane Ladd, Valerie Curtin, Lelia Goldoni, Lane Bradbury, Vic Tayback, Jodie Foster, Harvey Keitel, Murray Moston, Harry Northup, Martin Scorsese, Laura Dern	
D E C E M B E R	14	F for Fake	Planfilm / Specialty Films	Orson Welles (director/screenplay); Oja Kodar (screenplay); Orson Welles, Oja Kodar, Elmyr de Hory, Joseph Cotten, François Reichenbach, Richard Wilson, Paul Stewart	
D E C E M B E R	14	The Towering Inferno	20th Century Fox / Irwin Allen Productions	John Guillermin (director); Stirling Silliphant (screenplay); Steve McQueen, Paul Newman, William Holden, Faye Dunaway, Fred Astaire, Susan Blakely, Richard Chamberlain, Jennifer Jones	
D E C E M B E R	15	Young Frankenstein	20th Century Fox / Gruskoff/Venture Films / Crossbow Productions, Inc.	Mel Brooks (director/screenplay); Gene Wilder (screenplay); Gene Wilder, Peter Boyle, Marty Feldman, Cloris Leachman, Teri Garr, Kenneth Mars, Madeline Kahn	
D E C E M B E R	18	The Front Page	Universal Pictures	Billy Wilder (director/screenplay); I.A.L. Diamond (screenplay); Jack Lemmon, Walter Matthau, Vincent Gardenia, Susan Sarandon, Allen Garfield, David Wayne, Charles Durning, Austin Pendleton	
D E C E M B E R	20	Black Christmas	Warner Bros. / Canadian Film Development Corporation / Film Funding Ltd.	Bob Clark (director); A. Roy Moore (screenplay); Olivia Hussey, Keir Dullea, Margot Kidder, John Saxon, Andrea Martin, Doug McGrath, Art Hindle, Lynne Griffin, Leslie Carlson, Martha Gibson, Nick Mancuso, Bob Clark, Marian Waldman, James Edmond, Michael Rapport, John Rutter, Dave Clement, Julian Reed, Albert J. Dunk	
D E C E M B E R	20	The Godfather Part II	Paramount Pictures / The Coppola Company	Francis Ford Coppola (director/screenplay); Mario Puzo (screenplay); Al Pacino, Robert Duvall, Diane Keaton, Robert De Niro, Talia Shire, Morgana King, John Cazale, Marianna Hill, Lee Strasberg, Michael V. Gazzo, G.D. Spradlin, Richard Bright	
D E C E M B E R	20	Hearts and Minds	Warner Bros. / Rainbow Releasing	Peter Davis (director); Clark Clifford, John Foster Dulles, Georges Bidault, George Coker, Walt Rostow, J. W. Fulbright, J. Edgar Hoover, Joseph R. McCarthy	
D E C E M B E R	20	The Island at the Top of the World	Walt Disney Productions / Buena Vista Distribution	Robert Stevenson (director); John Whedon (screenplay); Donald Sinden, David Hartman, Jacques Marin, Mako, David Gwillim, Agneta Eckemyr, Lasse Kolstad, Rolf Søder, Sverre Anker Ousdal, Denny Miller, Ivor Barry, Lee Paul, Gunnar Öhlund, Erik Silju, Torsten Wahlund, Niels Hinrichsen, Brendan Dillon, James Almanzar	
D E C E M B E R	20	The Man with the Golden Gun	United Artists / Eon Productions	Guy Hamilton (director); Richard Maibaum, Tom Mankiewicz (screenplay); Roger Moore, Christopher Lee, Britt Ekland, Maud Adams, Hervé Villechaize, Clifton James, Richard Loo, Soon-Taik Oh, Marc Lawrence, Lois Maxwell, Marne Maitland, Desmond Llewelyn, James Cossins, Bernard Lee, Sonny Caldinez, Chan Yiu Lam, Francoise Therry	
D E C E M B E R	20	Swept Away (Italy)	Medusa Distribuzione	Lina Wertmüller (director/screenplay); Giancarlo Giannini, Mariangela Melato, Isa Danieli, Riccardo Salvino, Aldo Puglisi, Eros Pagni	
D E C E M B E R	25	Abby	American International Pictures	William Girdler (director); G. Cornell Layne (screenplay); Carol Speed, William Marshall, Terry Carter, Austin Stoker, Juanita Moore, Nathan Cook, Bob Holt, Charles Kissinger, Elliott Moffitt, Nancy Lee Owens, William P. Bradford	
D E C E M B E R	25	Freebie and the Bean	Warner Bros.	Richard Rush (director); Robert Kaufman (screenplay); James Caan, Alan Arkin, Loretta Swit, Jack Kruschen, Mike Kellin, Alex Rocco, Valerie Harper, Paul Koslo, Linda Marsh, Christopher Morley, Maurice Argent, Janice Karman, Evel Knievel, Sacheen Littlefeather	
D E C E M B E R	25	Where the Lilies Bloom	United Artists / Radnitz/Mattel Productions	William A. Graham (director); Earl Hamner Jr. (screenplay); Harry Dean Stanton, Rance Howard, Jan Smithers, Sudie Bond, Julie Gholson, Matthew Burrill, Helen Harmon, Tom Spratley, Helen Bragdon, Alice Beardsley, Bob Cole, Martha Nell Hardy, Resi Sinclair, Gregg Parrish, Janine Hughes, Karen Moody, Tom Guinn, Rev. George Stenhouse	
D E C E M B E R	28	ESPY (Japan)	Toho	Jun Fukuda (director); Ei Ogawa (screenplay); Hiroshi Fujioka, Kaoru Yumi, Masao Kusakari, Yuzo Kayama, Tomisaburo Wakayama, Katsumasa Uchida, Andrew Hughes, Eiji Okada, Gorō Mutsumi, Robert Dunham, Luna Takamura, Hatsuo Yamaya, Jimmy Shaw, Willie Dorsey, Steve Green, Ralph Jesser, Germal Liner, Franz Gruber, Bart Johanson	

== See also ==
- 1974 in the United States
