= Curtain Call (American TV series) =

American anthology TV series (1952)

- Genre: Dramatic anthology
- Country of origin: United States
- Original language: English
- No. of seasons: 1

Production
- Producer: Worthington Miner

Original release
- Network: NBC
- Release: June 20 – September 26, 1952

Curtain Call is an American television anthology series that aired on NBC from June 20, 1952 until September 26, 1952, as the summer replacement for The RCA Victor Show. Fourteen 30-minute episodes were telecast live from Hollywood. Its stories were based upon the works of writers like John Steinbeck, Henry James, F. Scott Fitzgerald, and John Cheever, among others.

Guest stars included Boris Karloff, Richard Kiley, Carol Bruce, Charlton Heston, Jack Palance, Robert Preston, Maureen Stapleton, Miriam Hopkins, and John Forsythe.

Worthington Miner developed the program as an attempt "to prove that TV could make good programming out of less dramatic material than could the movies or the stage".

Robert Boyle was the director.

== Episodes ==
Partial List of Episodes of Curtain Call
Date	Title	Actors
August 15, 1952	"The Vexations of A J Wentworth, B A"	Harry Townes, Melville Cooper, Michael McAloney, and Tarry Green
August 22, 1952	"The Liar"	Charlton Heston, Ilona Massey, Fredric Tozere, Susan Harris, Karen Lindgren
August 29, 1952	"The Summer People"	James Dunn, Frances Fuller, Paul Ford, Parker Fennelly, Margaret Hamilton, Jimmy Goodwin, Victor Thorley
September 5, 1952	"The Model Millionaire"	Michael Evans, Stella Andrew, Murray Matheson, Robin Craven, Peter Pagan
September 12, 1952	"Mutiny in the Zoo"	Louise Larrabee, Howard Smith, Nell Harrison, Harry Cook, Victoria Ward

== Bibliography ==
- Tim Brooks and Earle Marsh, The Complete Directory to Prime Time Network and Cable TV Shows 1946–Present, Ninth edition (New York: Ballantine Books, 2007) ISBN 978-0-345-49773-4
