= One Sunday Afternoon =

One Sunday Afternoon may refer to:

- One Sunday Afternoon (1933 film), an American pre-Code romantic comedy-drama film
- One Sunday Afternoon (1948 film), a musical film
