= Homebodies (film) =

1974 film by Larry Yust

- Theatrical release poster
- Directed by: Larry Yust
- Screenplay by: Howard Kaminsky; Bennett Sims; Larry Yust
- Produced by: Marshall Backlar
- Starring: Peter Brocco; Frances Fuller; William Hansen; Ruth McDevitt; Paula Trueman; Ian Wolfe
- Cinematography: Isidore Mankofsky
- Edited by: Peter Parasheles
- Music by: Bernardo Segall
- Production company: Cinema Entertainment
- Distributed by: Avco Embassy Pictures
- Release date: August 13, 1974 (Cincinnati)
- Running time: 96 minutes
- Country: United States
- Language: English
- Budget: $500,000

Homebodies is a 1974 American satirical comedy horror film directed by Larry Yust, and starring Ian Wolfe, Ruth McDevitt, Peter Brocco, Frances Fuller, Paula Trueman, Linda Marsh, and Douglas Fowley. The film centers on a group of elderly residents in a Cincinnati tenement building who resort to murder when their building is condemned in the wake of urban redevelopment.

Production of Homebodies began around 1973. The film was originally intended to be set in New York City, but was instead filmed and set in Cincinnati due to the significant urban redevelopment occurring there at the time. The film's cast is largely made up of veteran character actors who had appeared in numerous old Hollywood films, largely in supporting roles.

Homebodies premiered in Cincinnati on August 13, 1974, distributed by Avco Embassy Pictures. Its theatrical release expanded later that month, and it screened in numerous U.S. cities over the following year. The film was met with criticism at the time of its release for its explicit violence, though several reviewers praised its performances and technical attributes, as well as its social commentary on urban displacement, corporate greed, and mistreatment of the elderly.

== Plot ==
Elderly pensioner Mattie Spencer observes that tenants next-door to her Cincinnati apartment are being evicted in the wake of modern construction taking place, entailing a skyscraper funded by businessman Mr. Crawford. Emily Wilkins, an agoraphobic whose father owned several buildings in the neighborhood, reminisces about her upbringing there to Mattie. Outside, Mattie observes a construction worker fall to his death.

Mattie's neighbors and building superintendents, the Loomises, are told their building will be demolished later that week by social worker Miss Pollack, who delivers relocation notices. Sandy, a writer in the building, refuses Miss Pollack's eviction notice, while Mr. Blakely, an elderly blind man and longtime tenant, laments that he will be unable to become accustomed to a new environment. After the building's gas and electricity are turned off, the tenants begin using candlelight and building fires inside the building.

The following morning, an explosion on the construction site kills three workers, resulting in the foreman and his crew quitting the job. Meanwhile, a regulator informs Crawford that the accident may have been deliberately caused. Miss Pollack arrives with two police officers, finding that most of the tenants have apparently agreed to leave, though Mattie and Emily have disappeared. The Loomises, Mr. Blakely, and Mr. Sandy are relocated to public retirement housing.

When Miss Pollack returns to the building, Emily and Mattie ambush her before Emily stabs her to death. Mattie flees in Miss Pollack's car and disposes of the bloodied knife in a garbage truck. Meanwhile, Mr. Sandy, Mr. Blakely, and the Loomises flee the retirement facility and return to the building, where Mattie reveals Miss Pollack's corpse. The group remove Miss Pollack's body using a wheelchair and hurl it into a passing train. Mattie lures Crawford to the building, where the group incapacitate him. He offers to move them to a nicer building, but they refuse, bringing him to the skyscraper site where they bury him alive in wet cement. Realizing Crawford's foot is sticking out of the cement, Loomis hacks it off with an axe and brings it with him.

As demolition of other buildings on the block commences, Mrs. Loomis begins to feel guilty and considers reporting Crawford's murder to the police. An enraged Mattie clobbers her with an urn containing Emily's father's ashes before murdering Mr. Sandy to silence him. Fearing for her safety, Emily leaves the building, fleeing to the skyscraper, with Mattie pursuing her. A confrontation occurs on a scaffold, which a security guard witnesses before intervening. Mr. Loomis and Mr. Blakely arrive, and escort Mattie and Emily back to the building.

A furious Mattie insists she will continue to kill anyone who tries to stop her. Mr. Loomis, Mr. Blakely, and Emily attempt to kill Mattie by pushing her in front of a moving truck, but she narrowly escapes. Mattie flees into the nearby park, where tries to escape the others on a paddleboat, but Mr. Loomis, Mr. Blakely, and Emily catch up to her and seemingly drown her in the lake. Later, as a wrecking ball destroys the apartment building, Emily, Mr. Blakely, and Mr. Lookis are finally forced to leave. In an alleyway, they meet another elderly couple whose building is scheduled for demolition. Moments later, a vengeful Mattie appears in the alley, having survived her attempted murder.

== Cast ==
- Peter Brocco as Mr. Blakely
- Frances Fuller as Miss Emily
- William Hansen as Mr. Sandy
- Ruth McDevitt as Mrs. Loomis
- Paula Trueman as Mattie
- Ian Wolfe as Mr. Loomis
- Linda Marsh as Miss Pollack
- Douglas Fowley as Mr. Crawford
- Kenneth Tobey as Construction Boss
- Wesley Lau as Construction Foreman
- Eldon Quick as Insurance Inspector
- William Benedict as Watchman

== Production ==
=== Development ===
The screenplay for Homebodies was written by Howard Kaminsky, Bennett Sims, and director Larry Yust. The project was produced by Marshall Backlar and executive-produced by James Levitt; the film was financed through Levitt's father, real estate developer William Levitt, who provided a production budget of $500,000. Prior to writing the script treatment for Homebodies, Yust had collaborated with Backlar on the blaxploitation film Trick Baby (1972).

=== Casting ===
The film's cast was composed of veteran actors and actresses who, according to Daily Variety's report, "had appeared in nine hundred films, collectively, but were receiving top-billing for the first time in their careers."

=== Filming ===
Principal photography for Homebodies took place in 1973 over a four week-period on location in Cincinnati, Ohio. Locations included the Burnet Woods and Fountain Square. The film was originally supposed to be set in New York City, but the production scouted several other American cities and chose Cincinnati due to the redevelopment occurring there at the time. The film marked the second film production by the Cinema Entertainment Corporation. "I had zeroed in on four or five cities in the Midwest that made the most sense because of their look and feel," Backlar recalled. "You had the West End right off Downtown [Cincinnati] where they were doing major demolition. So the timing was perfect."

Once location shooting was completed, some interior sequences as well as the scenes inside the skyscraper were shot in Los Angeles over a period of two weeks.

== Release ==
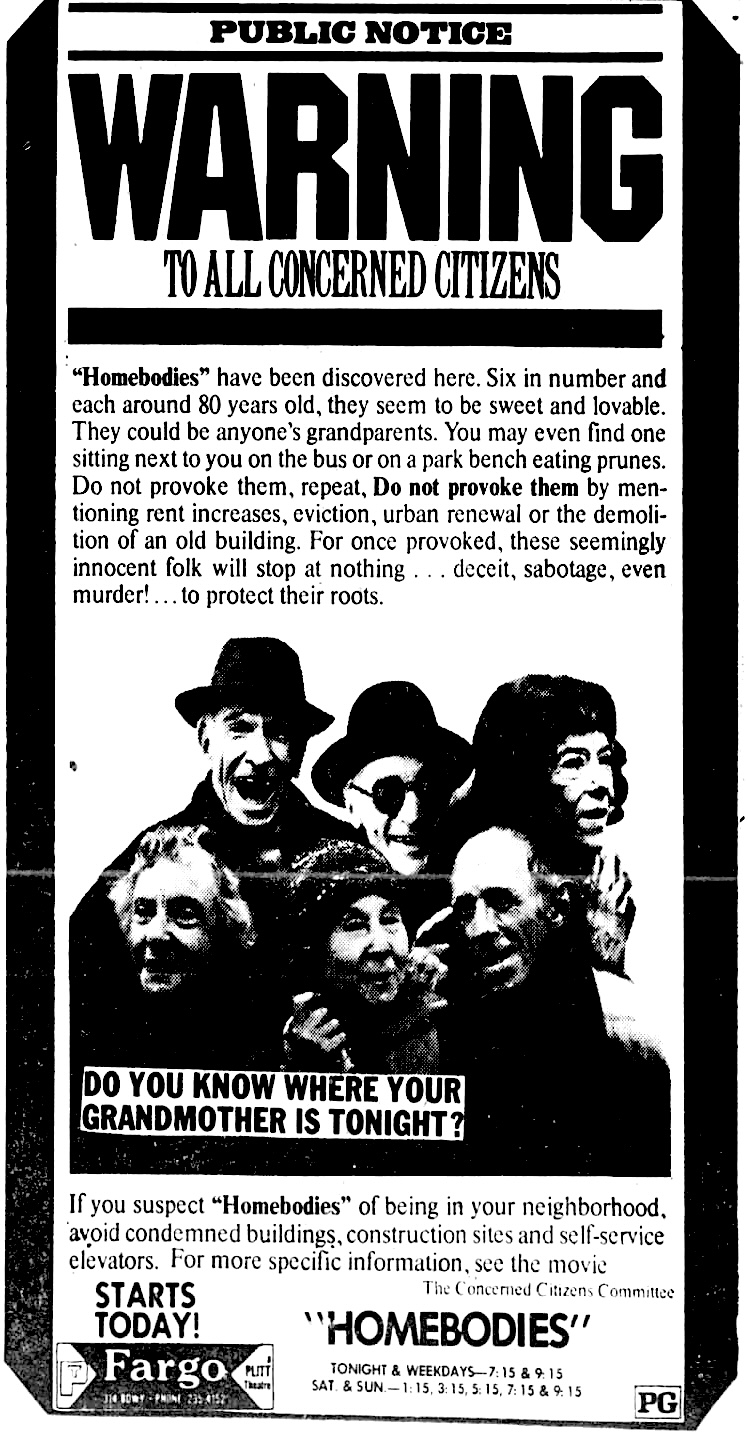
Newspaper advertisement for the film's release in Fargo, North Dakota

Homebodies was originally intended to screen at the Cannes Film Festival, though this never materialized. In June 1974, it was announced that Avco Embassy Pictures had acquired international distribution rights to the film.

The film had its world premiere at the Skywalk Cinema in Cincinnati on August 13, 1974. The film's marketing campaign featured newspaper advertisements modeled after public service announcements warning "concerned citizens," with the tagline: "Do you know where your grandmother is tonight?"

Its release expanded to several other cities, including Lexington, Kentucky on August 30, 1974. It continued to screen regionally through the remainder of the year, showing in Minneapolis, Minnesota, Fargo, North Dakota, and Raleigh, North Carolina. It continued to screen throughout 1975 in various other American cities.

The film was theatrically distributed in several Canadian cities, including Hamilton and Toronto, Ontario, opening on December 6, 1974.

=== Home media ===
Homebodies was released on VHS by Sony Pictures on June 23, 1994.

Kino Lorber released a special edition Blu-ray on November 2, 2021.

== Reception ==
=== Contemporary ===
The National Catholic Office described elements of the film as "grisly" and "illogical," but commended it for its subtext, noting that "a curiously affecting residue of theme—that the lives of old people, like those quaint Victorian structures, are all too often wasted in the name of "progress"—remains to haunt the viewer." Jim Clements of The Hamilton Spectator similarly commented that, "on the surface, Homebodies is a straight tale of terror... But beneath that, is a layer of more likable stuff," commending the screenplay and themes of urban displacement stemming from corporate greed. Dorothy Smiljanich of the Tampa Bay Times also commented on the film's thematic complexity, writing that if it "were less well done, it would be easy to dismiss it as a gory bit of comedy, but there is something more serious and thereby sinister about these goings on. The movie is, by its very nature, amoral. Winning our approval for the old folks early on, it betrays us later by shifting our perspective so that they become grotesque monsters."

Jean Dietrich of the Courier Journal was critical of the film, noting that "there's a seed of a good story idea," but felt the screenplay is "painfully stupid... The plight of these people being forced to relocate is a tragedy that should stir feelings of pity. Instead it bores you to death." Jay Cocks, writing for Time, noted: "Homebodies is plotted out and done up with competence, so it does not look like the usual sleazy horror flick. For a yarn like this to work at all, though, the elfin imagination of a John Collier or Roald Dahl is indispensable. The authors and director of Homebodies have no such wit."

The film's depiction of violence drew some criticism: Ridge Kennedy of the Evansville Press, though noting the performances, themes, and cinematography as accomplished, found the violence "distasteful" and concluded: "This is a story that needs to be told. Somebody ought to make a good film about it." Patrick Taggart of the Austin American-Statesman also found the film's violence graphic and obscene and the screenplay lacking humor, though he conceded that the performances from Brocco, Wolfe, Fuller, McDevitt, and Hansen "are what save Homebodies from being a very bad movie." Writing for the Jackson Citizen Patriot, Alvin A. Kushner commented that he felt the film's PG rating by the Motion Picture Association of America was too lenient, citing numerous scenes of explicit murder in the film. Alternately, Victor Stanton of the Waterloo Region Record praised the film's violent content, noting that "the deliberate grossness with which the murders are depicted on screen gives it a very sick twist," also praising the acting and technical production as "remarkably polished."

=== Retrospective ===
Time Out gave the film a positive review, complimenting the film's humor, well controlled tension, as well as Trueman's "saner version of Ruth Gordon" performance. AllMovie called the film "an unexpectedly haunting piece of work", complimenting the film's unpredictability, strong characterization, and direction. TV Guide awarded the film 2 out of 4 stars, calling it "a strange little shocker about a murderous group of geriatrics", although the reviewer commended the film for being well shot, and directed.

Glenn Erickson, reviewing the film for Trailers from Hell in 2021, praised it, writing: "Homebodies remains interesting because 1) its vision of the abandoned elderly rings true, and 2) the pensioners’ resistance mirrors ‘pointless’ violence seen elsewhere in society. Once they cross the line ‘not to spill blood’ there’s no turning back. The show indeed slips into horror territory with the big-time developer that evicted them. When they function as a gang the tenants seem capable of anything." Ian Jane, reviewing the film for DVD Talk upon its Blu-ray release, wrote, "the solid production values and obvious amount of talent behind the camera pays off, but the performances here really are very good... Homebodies is one part creepy, one part funny and one hundred percent entertaining. Those with an appreciation for dark humor should definitely enjoy this quirky, underappreciated picture."

On his website Fantastic Movie Musings and Ramblings, critic Dave Sindelar gave the film a positive review, calling it "an engaging curiosity". In his review, Sindelar commended the film for its "offbeat and eccentric" premise, and wicked sense of humor. Sindelar also commended the film's acting, particularly Trueman's.

The horror film website The Terror Trap awarded the film three out of a possible four stars, commending the film's acting, humor, feeling of urban decay, calling it "a heartwarming horror story".

== Sources ==
- Lentz, Harris M. III (2018). Obituaries in the Performing Arts, 2017. Jefferson, North Carolina: McFarland & Company. ISBN 978-1-476-67032-4.
