= Ellsworth Hoagland =

American film editor (1903–1972)

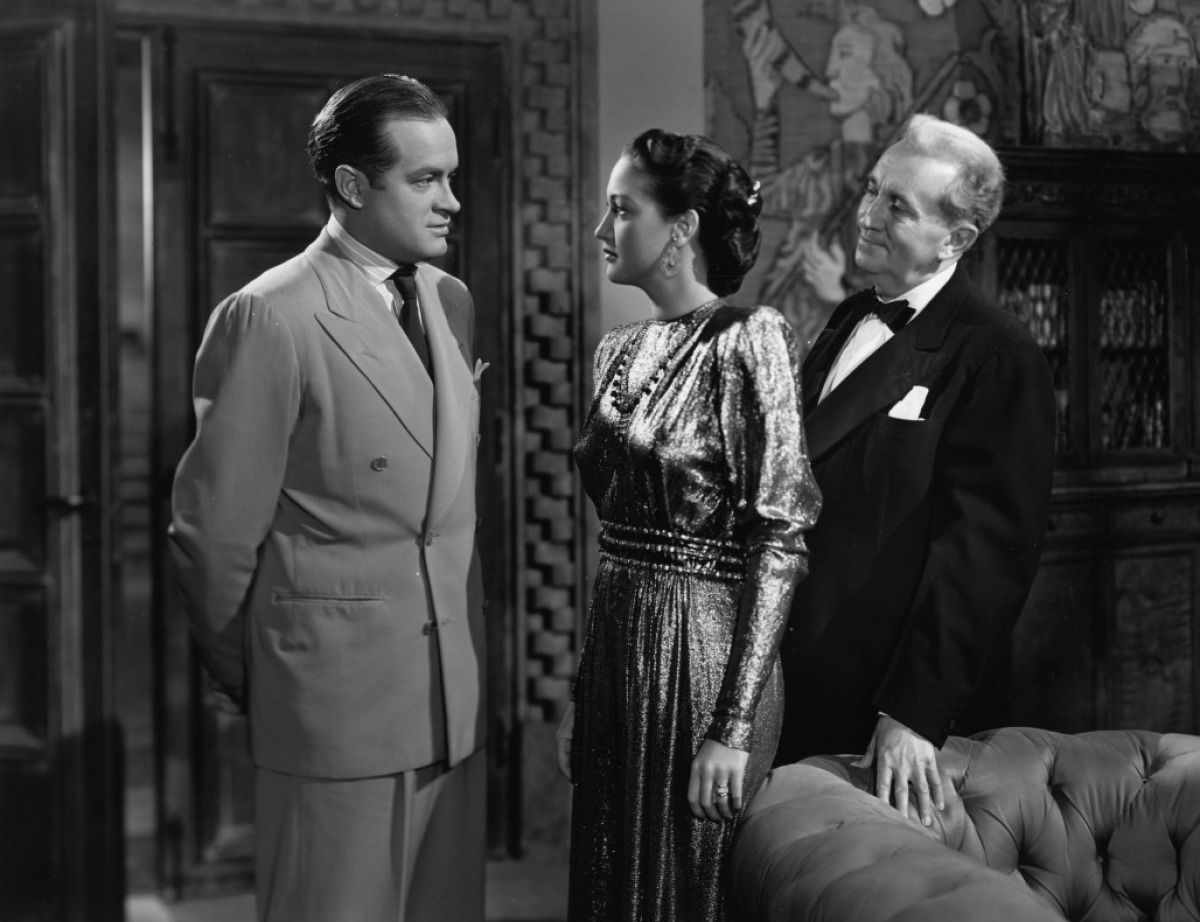
- Born: August 15, 1903; California, United States
- Died: September 4, 1972 (aged 69); Los Angeles, California, United States
- Occupation: Film editor

Howard Ellsworth Hoagland (August 15, 1903 – September 4, 1972) was an American film editor. He worked on several films and television series. His career began in 1933, when he edited One Sunday Afternoon.

In 1936, Hoagland received an Academy Award for Best Film Editing nomination. In 1966, he won a Primetime Emmy Award for editing the television series Bonanza.

== Selected filmography ==
- One Sunday Afternoon (1933)
- The Night of January 16th (1941)
- Cross My Heart (1946)
- The Country Girl (1954)
