= Elmer and Elsie =

1934 film by Gilbert Pratt

- Directed by: Gilbert Pratt
- Screenplay by: Humphrey Pearson
- Story by: Marc Connelly; George S. Kaufman
- Produced by: Louis D. Lighton
- Starring: George Bancroft; Frances Fuller; Roscoe Karns; George Barbier; Nella Walker; Charles Sellon
- Cinematography: William C. Mellor
- Edited by: Richard C. Currier
- Production company: Paramount Pictures
- Distributed by: Paramount Pictures
- Release date: August 4, 1934
- Running time: 65 minutes
- Country: United States
- Language: English

Elmer and Elsie is a 1934 American comedy film directed by Gilbert Pratt and written by Humphrey Pearson. The film stars George Bancroft, Frances Fuller, Roscoe Karns, George Barbier, Nella Walker and Charles Sellon. The film was released on August 4, 1934, by Paramount Pictures.

== Cast ==
- George Bancroft as Elmer Beebe
- Frances Fuller as Elsie Beebe
- Roscoe Karns as Rocky Cott
- George Barbier as John Kincaid
- Nella Walker as Mrs. Eva Kincaid
- Charles Sellon as George Simpson
- Helena Phillips Evans as Ma Simpson
- Ruth Clifford as Mamie
- Albert Conti as Barlotti
- Floyce Brown as Anna
- Vera Steadman as Blanche
- Helen Lynch as Ruby
- Marie Wells as Mabel
- Tom Dempsey as Joe
- Eddie Baker as Evans
- Duke York as Smith
- William Robyns as Al
- Alfred P. James as Postman
