= Frontier (1955 TV series) =

- Genre: Western
- Narrated by: Walter Coy
- No. of seasons: 1
- No. of episodes: 31

Production
- Executive producer: Worthington Miner

Original release
- Network: NBC
- Release: September 25, 1955

Frontier is an anthology Western television series, described as having "authentic" and "based-on-fact" stories, which premiered on NBC on September 25, 1955, and ran through September 1956. It was created by Morton S. Fine and David Friedkin. This was the second television anthology Western series, after Death Valley Days, and as such had no regular cast members, except that each episode was introduced and narrated by Walter Coy. Episode directors included Sidney Lumet, Don Siegel and Worthington Miner. The series ran for 31 episodes.

== Cast ==
As an anthology series, the cast changed from week to week. Walter Coy served as the narrator each week to introduce the story, and following the Death Valley Days format, he also occasionally appeared as a guest actor. Guest stars included Jack Kelly, Leo Gordon, Tom Tryon, Phyllis Coates, Jack Elam, John Dehner, Denver Pyle, Strother Martin, James Best, Chuck Connors, Rhodes Reason, Alan Hale Jr., Mike Connors, Robert Vaughn, Richard Crenna, Claude Akins, Coleen Gray, Richard Boone, Catherine McLeod, Tommy Kirk and Gloria Talbott, among others.

== Production and background ==
1955 saw the introduction of the adult Western television series with The Life and Legend of Wyatt Earp, Gunsmoke, Cheyenne, and Frontier. As an anthology series, it followed the format of Death Valley Days by focusing on realism of the stories, with less emphasis on outlaws and more focus on the rugged harshness of the West.

Narrator Walter Coy opened each episode by saying, "This is the West. This is the land of beginning again. This is the story of men and women facing the frontier. This is the way it happened." He ended each episode with "It happened that way... moving West."

Of the adult Westerns introduced in 1955, Frontier was the only one to be canceled after one season. This is partially due to being put into a timeslot opposite The Jack Benny Program, which was fifth in the ratings for 1955. Another contributing factor is that, unlike the other adult Westerns, Frontier was written to attract a female audience. Fifty percent of the scripts were focused on women, with executive producer Worthington Miner telling TV Guide that the show "is about women with guts, not men with guns".

== Release ==
Frontier aired only one season, from September 25, 1955, to September 9, 1956. It aired Sunday nights from 7:30 pm–8:00 pm on NBC.

== Reception ==
Although it only lasted one season, and failed to break into the Nielsen top 30 for 1955, Frontier did manage to receive positive reviews. The New York Times called the premier episode "a superior adventure yarn" and wrote that "with the other recent arrivals, Gunsmoke and the Wyatt Earp series, Frontier should provide Western fans with enough action to carry them nicely through the winter". Variety wrote that Frontier "may prove a giant among the new crop of 'adult' Westerns". TV Guide added to the positive reviews by pointing out that Frontier "eschews the exploits of guntoting marshals", instead concentrating on the "ordinary people who helped settle the West", calling the show "uniformly excellent" and "absorbing".
