= William Hansen (actor) =

American actor (1911–1975)

- Born: William Mansell Hansen; March 2, 1911; Tacoma, Washington, U.S.
- Died: June 23, 1975 (aged 64); Woodland Hills, Los Angeles, California, U.S.
- Occupation: Actor
- Years active: 1945–1975

William Mansell Hansen (March 2, 1911 – June 23, 1975) was an American actor, active in film, television and the stage.

== Career ==
A founding member of the Actors Studio in New York, Hansen played Dr. Mackenzie in the Broadway production of Medicine Show (1940). He originated the role of Mr. Lundie in the original Broadway production of Brigadoon in 1947, and the role of Royal Addams in original Broadway production of The Member of the Wedding in 1950. He reprised the latter role in the 1952 film adaption.

Starting with an uncredited role in Elia Kazan's film Pinky in 1949, Hansen also worked as a character actor in movies and television shows. He appeared in the role of Secretary Swensen in Fail Safe, and as one of America's founding fathers, Caesar Rodney, in the film 1776.

== Filmography ==
Film
Year	Title	Role	Notes
1949	Pinky	Mr. Goolby	Uncredited
1950	Side Street	Dr. Harry Sternberg	Uncredited
1952	The Member of the Wedding	Mr. Addams	
1960	The Bramble Bush	Father Bannon	
1961	The Young Doctors	X-Ray Technician	Uncredited
1962	Birdman of Alcatraz	Fred Daw	Uncredited
1964	Fail Safe	Secretary Swenson	
1969	The Arrangement	Dr. Weeks	
1970	Diary of a Mad Housewife	Worker in the Balser apartment	Uncredited
1971	Willard	Mr. Barskin	
1972	1776	Caesar Rodney (DE)	
1973	Save the Tiger	Meyer	
1973	The Laughing Policeman	Mr. Schwermer	
1974	The Terminal Man	Dr. Ezra Manon	
1974	99 and 44/100% Dead	Joe - Kelly's Accountant	Uncredited
1974	Homebodies	Mr. Sandy	

Television
Year	Title	Role	Notes
1945	The Front Page	Unknown	
1953	The Trip to Bountiful	Ticket man (second bus station)	
1953–1955	The Philco-Goodyear Television Playhouse		4 episodes
1956	Playwrights '56	Parker	1 episode
1956–1957	The Alcoa Hour	Santa / R.B. Angus	2 episodes
1959	Playhouse 90	Milliard	1 episode
1959	Alfred Hitchcock Presents	Henry Babcock	Season 4 Episode 31: "Your Witness"
1954–1960	The United States Steel Hour	Quillan / -	2 episodes
1960	Armstrong Circle Theatre		1 episode
1961	Naked City	Joe 'Papa' Ganoulian	1 episode
1961	Great Ghost Tales		1 episode
1962	The DuPont Show of the Week	Doctor Scully	1 episode
1962–1964	The Defenders	Randall / Dr. James Warrener	2 episodes
1965	Slattery's People	Adam Smith / Dave Logan	2 episodes
1966	An Enemy of the People	Nansen	
1969	Bonanza	Vinson	1 episode
1969	Mission: Impossible	Dr. Wimmel	1 episode
1962–1971	Hallmark Hall of Fame	Mr. Oshira / Mentor Graham / Ozni	3 episodes
1971	Night Gallery	Mr. Godwin	1 episode
1972	Cade's County	Barney	1 episode
1972	Sandcastles	Sascha	TV movie
1972	Sanford and Son	Pawnbroker	1 episode
1972	Cannon	Bellman / Caretaker	2 episodes
1973	Kojak	Old man hostage	1 episode "Siege of Terror"
1973	Frankenstein	Professor Waldman	2 episodes of ABC's Wide World of Mystery
