= Paula Trueman =

American film, stage and television actress (1897–1994)

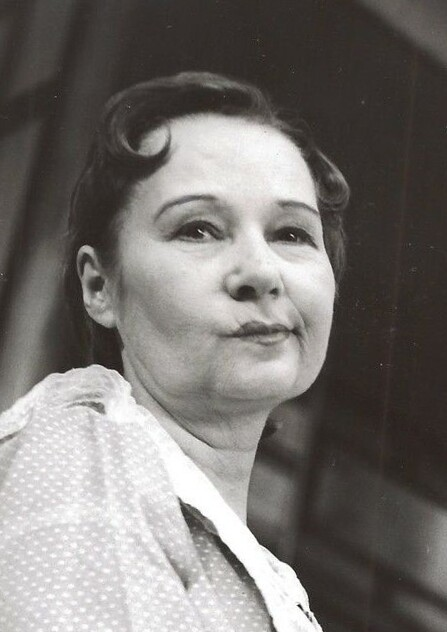
- Trueman, in Wake Up Darling, 1956
- Born: April 25, 1897; New York City, U.S.
- Died: March 23, 1994 (aged 96); New York City, U.S.
- Occupations: Film, stage and television actress
- Years active: 1930–1988
- Spouse: Harold Sterner (m. 1936; died 1976)

Paula Trueman (April 25, 1897 – March 23, 1994) was an American film, stage and television actress.

== Life and career ==
Born in 1897 in New York City, to Joseph and Eva (née Cohn) Trueman, she had two sisters, a twin, Natalie (Mrs. Sternberg) and an elder sister, Hannah (Mrs. Bottstein). They were raised in Manhattan. Paula attended Hunter College before gaining admission to the Neighborhood Playhouse to study dancing. Her stage career began with The Grand Street Follies revues in 1924, and at the end of that year she made her dramatic debut in The Little Clay Cart. She was also in the 1930 revue Sweet and Low, which starred Fannie Brice, George Jessel, and James Barton, and appeared in Kiss and Tell, 'For Love or Money and Wake Up, Darling in the 1940s and 1950s.

Her film debut was in Crime Without Passion (1934). She later played "Mrs. Fenty" in Paint Your Wagon and "Grandma Sarah" in The Outlaw Josey Wales (both with Clint Eastwood). She appeared in Annie Hall and Zelig (both by Woody Allen), Dirty Dancing, and had an uncredited role in Moonstruck. In 1978, she played Maggie Flannigan in All My Children. She appeared as Aunt Teresa in the Tales from the Darkside episode (2/12 - 1985) "Monsters in My Room" and the dying great grandmother in "The Cutty Black Sow" (1988), series 4 episode 14.

== Death ==
Trueman died of natural causes in New York Hospital in 1994, aged 96. She was predeceased in 1976 by her husband, Harold Sterner, an architect, whom she married in 1936.

== Filmography ==
=== Film ===
Paula Trueman film credits
Year	Title	Role	Notes
1934	Crime Without Passion	Buster Malloy	Uncredited
1941	One Foot in Heaven	Miss Peabody	Uncredited
1969	Paint Your Wagon	Mrs. Fenty	
1971	The Anderson Tapes	Nurse	
1974	Homebodies	Mattie	
1975	The Stepford Wives	Welcome Wagon Lady	
1976	The Outlaw Josey Wales	Grandma Sarah	
1977	Annie Hall	Street Stranger #6	
1980	Can't Stop the Music	Stick-up Lady	
1983	Zelig	Woman on Telephone	
1984	Grace Quigley	Dorothy Trugert	
1984	Mrs. Soffel	Mrs. Stevenson	
1986	Say Yes	Lady on Bus	
1986	Seize the Day	Woman #1	
1987	Sweet Lorraine	Mrs. Falkman	
1987	Dirty Dancing	Mrs. Schumacher	
1987	Moonstruck	Lucy	
1990	The Sun and the Moon		

=== Television ===
Paula Trueman television credits
Year	Title	Role	Notes
1949	Studio One	Miss Tartlett	1 episode
1978	All My Children	Maggie Flannigan	
1982	The Electric Grandmother	Old Agatha	TV movie
1985	Tales from the Darkside	Aunt Teresa	Episode: "Monsters in My Room"
1987	The Equalizer	Mrs. Hammerschmidt	Episode: "Beyond Control"
1988	Tales from the Darkside	Great Grandma / Catherine	Episode: "The Cutty Black Sow"
