= Ian Wolfe =

American actor (1896–1992)

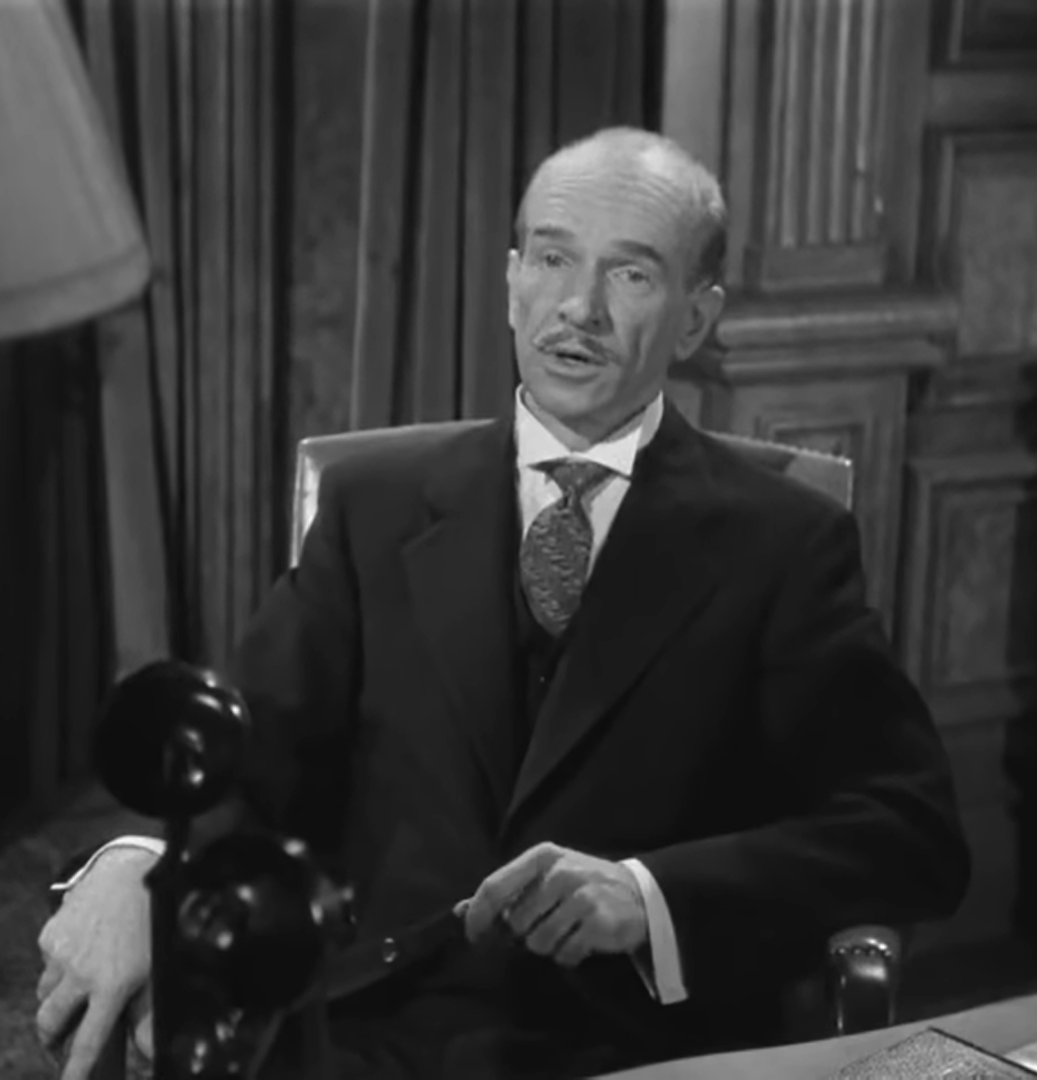
- Wolfe in Dressed to Kill (1946)
- Born: Ian Marcus Wolfe; November 4, 1896; Canton, Illinois, U.S.
- Died: January 23, 1992 (aged 95); Los Angeles, California, U.S.
- Other names: Ien Wulf, Ian Macwolfe, Ian Wolf
- Occupation: Actor
- Years active: 1934–1990
- Spouse: Elizabeth Schroder (m. 1924)
- Children: 2

Ian Marcus Wolfe (November 4, 1896 – January 23, 1992) was an American character actor with around 400 film and television credits. Until 1934, he worked in the theatre. That year, he appeared in his first film role and later television, as a character actor. His career lasted seven decades and included many films and TV series; his last screen credit was in 1990.

== Early years ==
Born in Canton, Illinois, Wolfe studied at the American Academy of Dramatic Arts.

== Career ==
Wolfe's stage debut came in The Claw (1919). He went on to become assistant director of the Community Arts Players in Santa Barbara, California, and by 1927 he was the director of the Tacoma Little Theatre's Drama League Players. A review of one of the Tacoma group's productions in The Tacoma News Tribune said that Wolfe "took unknown amateurs, many of them new to stagecraft, and in an incredibly short time produced a most entertaining play".

His Broadway credits include The Deputy (1964), Winesburg, Ohio (1958), Lone Valley (1933), Devil in the Mind (1931), The Barretts of Wimpole Street (1931), Lysistrata (1930), The Seagull (1930), At the Bottom (1930), Skyrocket (1929), Gods of the Lightning (1928), and The Claw (1921).

Wolfe made his film debut in The Barretts of Wimpole Street (1934). He appeared in many films, including Mutiny on the Bounty (1935), Alfred Hitchcock's Foreign Correspondent (1940) and Saboteur (1942), Julius Caesar (1953), Nicholas Ray's Rebel Without a Cause (1955) and George Lucas's THX 1138 (1971). Although he was American by birth, his experience in the theatre gave him precise diction, and he was often cast as Englishmen on screen, including a fictional commissioner of Scotland Yard in the final film in the 1939–1946 Sherlock Holmes film series, Dressed to Kill (1946). He also appeared in three other films in the series, as an American antiques dealer in Sherlock Holmes in Washington (1943), as a butler in The Scarlet Claw (1944), and as an art dealer in The Pearl of Death (1944). He played Carter, Sir Wilfrid Robarts's clerk and office manager in Witness for the Prosecution (1957).

Wolfe played a crooked small-town doctor in "Six Gun's Legacy", an episode from the first (1949) season of The Lone Ranger. Wolfe appeared in the 1966 Perry Mason episode "The Case of the Midnight Howler" as Abel Jackson. In 1966, he portrayed the new Rev. Leighton on The Andy Griffith Show ("Aunt Bee's Crowning Glory", broadcast October 10, 1966). He also appeared in two episodes of the original Star Trek television series: "Bread and Circuses" (1968) as Septimus, and "All Our Yesterdays" (1969) as Mr. Atoz. He guest-starred in a 1977 episode of the ABC crime drama The Feather and Father Gang, and portrayed the wizard Traquill in the series Wizards and Warriors (1983). In 1982, Wolfe had a small recurring role on the TV series WKRP in Cincinnati as Hirsch, the sarcastic, irreverent butler to WKRP owner Lillian Carlson.

Central to Wolfe's appeal as a character actor was that, until he reached actual old age, he always looked considerably older than he really was. In the film Mad Love (1935), he played Colin Clive's stepfather, yet he was only four years older than Clive. In the film Houdini (1953), he warned the magician to avoid occult matters, telling him to "take the advice of an old man". He appeared in movies for another 37 years; his last film credit was for Dick Tracy (1990).

== Personal life and death ==
During World War I, Wolfe served in the United States Army as a volunteer medical specialist. He became a sergeant.

Wolfe wrote and self-published two books of poetry, Forty-Four Scribbles and a Prayer: Lyrics and Ballads and Sixty Ballads and Lyrics in Search of Music.

He was married to Elizabeth Schroder for 68 years, from 1924 until his death; the couple had two daughters. Wolfe died in Los Angeles on January 23, 1992, aged 95.

== Partial filmography ==
- The Fountain (1934) as Van Arkel
- The Barretts of Wimpole Street (1934) as Harry Bevan
- The Mighty Barnum (1934) as Swedish consul
- Clive of India (1935) as Mr. Kent (uncredited)
- The Raven (1935) as Geoffrey
- Mad Love (1935) as Henry Orlac (uncredited)
- 1,000 Dollars a Minute (1935) as Davidson (uncredited)
- Mutiny on the Bounty (1935) as Maggs
- The Leavenworth Case (1936) as Hudson
- The Music Goes 'Round (1936) as doctor (uncredited)
- The White Angel (1936) as patient (uncredited)
- Romeo and Juliet (1936) as apothecary (uncredited)
- The Devil Is a Sissy (1936) as pawnbroker (uncredited)
- The Bold Caballero (1936) as the priest
- Maytime (1937) as court official (uncredited)
- The Prince and the Pauper (1937) as proprietor
- The League of Frightened Men (1937) as Nicholas Cabot
- The Devil Is Driving (1937) as Elias Sanders
- The Emperor's Candlesticks (1937) as Leon
- The Firefly (1937) as Izquierdo (uncredited)
- Conquest (1937) as Prince Metternich (uncredited)
- Arsène Lupin Returns (1938) as Le Marchand
- Marie Antoinette (1938) as Herbert (uncredited)
- You Can't Take It with You (1938) as Kirby's secretary (uncredited)
- Blondie (1938) as judge
- Orphans of the Street (1938) as Eli Thadius Bunting
- Lincoln in the White House (1939) as a member of Lincoln's cabinet (uncredited)
- Fast and Loose (1939) as Wilkes
- Society Lawyer (1939) as Schmidt
- Tell No Tales (1939) as Fritz (uncredited)
- On Borrowed Time (1939) as Charles Wentworth
- The Great Commandment (1939) as tax collector
- Blondie Brings Up Baby (1939) as police judge (uncredited)
- Allegheny Uprising (1939) as Poole
- The Return of Doctor X (1939) as cemetery caretaker (uncredited)
- The Earl of Chicago (1940) as reading clerk
- Abe Lincoln in Illinois (1940) as Horace Greeley (uncredited)
- Earthbound (1940) as Amos Totten
- We Who Are Young (1940) as judge
- Foreign Correspondent (1940) as Stiles
- The Son of Monte Cristo (1940) as Conrad Stadt
- Hudson's Bay (1941) as mayor
- The Trial of Mary Dugan (1941) as Dr. Wriston (uncredited)
- Singapore Woman (1941) as Lawyer Sidney P. Melrose (uncredited)
- Love Crazy (1941) as sanity-hearing doctor (uncredited)
- Adventure in Washington (1941) as Emerson (uncredited)
- Shining Victory (1941) as Mr. Carew (uncredited)
- Paris Calling (1941) as thin workman (uncredited)
- Born to Sing (1942) as critic (uncredited)
- Secret Agent of Japan (1942) as Capt. Larsen
- Saboteur (1942) as Robert, the butler
- Mrs. Miniver (1942) as dentist (uncredited)
- Bombs Over Burma (1942) as man (uncredited)
- Eagle Squadron (1942) as Sir Charles Porter
- Now, Voyager (1942) as Lloyd (uncredited)
- Nightmare (1942) as James
- Random Harvest (1942) as registrar of births (uncredited)
- The Moon Is Down (1943) as Joseph (uncredited)
- Sherlock Holmes in Washington (1943) as antique store clerk (uncredited)
- The Falcon in Danger (1943) as Thomas (uncredited)
- The Man from Down Under (1943) as soldier seeking Father Antoine (uncredited)
- Holy Matrimony (1943) as Strawley (uncredited)
- Corvette K-225 (1943) as paymaster commander (uncredited)
- Flesh and Fantasy (1943) as librarian (uncredited)
- Government Girl (1943) as Thomas – hotel clerk (uncredited)
- The Falcon and the Co-eds (1943) as Eustace L. Harley (uncredited)
- The Song of Bernadette (1943) as minister of the interior (uncredited)
- The Impostor (1944) as Sgt. Clerk
- Her Primitive Man (1944) as Caleb
- Seven Days Ashore (1944) as process server (uncredited)
- Once Upon a Time (1944) as Joe (uncredited)
- The White Cliffs of Dover (1944) as skipper of honeymoon boat (uncredited)
- The Scarlet Claw (1944) as Drake
- The Invisible Man's Revenge (1944) as Feeney
- Are These Our Parents? (1944) as Pa Henderson
- Wilson (1944) as reporter (uncredited)
- The Pearl of Death (1944) as Amos Hodder
- Reckless Age (1944) as Prof. Mellasagus (uncredited)
- In Society (1944) as butler (uncredited)
- The Merry Monahans (1944) as clerk
- Babes on Swing Street (1944) as Anjsel (uncredited)
- The National Barn Dance (1944) as minister (uncredited)
- Mystery of the River Boat (1944 serial) as Herman Einreich (Chapters 1–3)
- Murder in the Blue Room (1944) as Edwards
- The Bandit of Sherwood Forest (1945) as Lord Mortimer
- A Song to Remember (1945) as Pleyel's clerk (uncredited)
- Zombies on Broadway (1945) as Prof. Hopkins
- Counter-Attack (1945) as Ostrovski (uncredited)
- Blonde Ransom (1945) as Oliver
- The Brighton Strangler (1945) as Lord Mayor Herman Brandon R. Clive
- Love Letters (1945) as Vicar (uncredited)
- Strange Confession (1945) as Frederick (uncredited)
- This Love of Ours (1945) as Dr. Straus (uncredited)
- Confidential Agent (1945) as Dr. Bellows
- The Fighting Guardsman (1946) as Prefect Berton (uncredited)
- Tomorrow Is Forever (1946) as Norton
- Three Strangers (1946) as Gillkie the Barrister (uncredited)
- The Notorious Lone Wolf (1946) as Adam Wheelright
- Bedlam (1946) as Sidney Long
- Without Reservations (1946) as Charlie Gibbs (uncredited)
- Dressed to Kill (1946) as commissioner of Scotland Yard
- The Searching Wind (1946) as Sears
- Gentleman Joe Palooka (1946) as Editor W.W. Dwight
- The Verdict (1946) as Jury Foreman (uncredited)
- The Falcon's Adventure (1946) as J.D. Denison
- California (1947) as President James K. Polk (uncredited)
- That Way with Women (1947) as L.B. Crandall
- Pursued (1947) as Coroner (uncredited)
- Dishonored Lady (1947) as Dr. E.G. Lutz (uncredited)
- The Marauders (1947) as Deacon Black
- Wild Harvest (1947) as Martin (uncredited)
- Desire Me (1947) as Dr. Poulin (uncredited)
- The Judge Steps Out (1947) as Hector Brown
- If Winter Comes (1947) as Dr. Clement Avington (uncredited)
- Three Daring Daughters (1948) as Martin (uncredited)
- The Miracle of the Bells (1948) as Grave Digger (uncredited)
- Mr. Blandings Builds His Dream House (1948) as Smith
- Johnny Belinda (1948) as rector (uncredited)
- Silver River (1948) as process server (uncredited)
- They Live by Night (1948) as Hawkins
- Julia Misbehaves (1948) as Hobson, the butler
- Homicide (1949) as Fritz (uncredited)
- Bride of Vengeance (1949) as councillor (uncredited)
- The Younger Brothers (1949) as chairman of parole board
- Manhandled (1949) as Charlie (uncredited)
- Colorado Territory (1949) as Homer Wallace
- Joe Palooka in the Counterpunch (1949) as Prof. Lilliquist
- My Friend Irma (1949) as minister (uncredited)
- Please Believe Me (1950) as Edward Warrender
- No Way Out (1950) as Watkins (uncredited)
- The Petty Girl (1950) as President Webb (uncredited)
- Copper Canyon (1950) as Mr. Henderson
- Emergency Wedding (1950) as Dr. White (uncredited)
- The Magnificent Yankee (1950) as Adams
- A Place in the Sun (1951) as Dr. Wyeland (uncredited)
- Double Crossbones (1951) as prison guard (uncredited)
- The Great Caruso (1951) as Hutchins
- Mask of the Avenger (1951) as Signor Donner
- Here Comes the Groom (1951) as Uncle Adam
- On Dangerous Ground (1951) as Sheriff Carrey
- The Captive City (1952) as Rev. Nash
- Holiday for Sinners (1952) as Monsignor Lavaud (uncredited)
- Les Misérables (1952) as presiding judge (uncredited)
- Captain Pirate (1952) as Viceroy (uncredited)
- Something for the Birds (1952) as Foster
- Julius Caesar (1953) as Ligarius
- Scandal at Scourie (1953) as Councilman Hurdwell
- Young Bess (1953) as Stranger (uncredited)
- Houdini (1953) as Malue
- 99 River Street (1953) as Waldo Daggett
- The Actress (1953) as Mr. Bagley
- About Mrs. Leslie (1954) as Mr. Pope
- Seven Brides for Seven Brothers (1954) as Rev. Elcott
- Her Twelve Men (1954) as Roger Frane
- The Steel Cage (1954) as Curly Henderson (segment "The Face") (uncredited)
- The Silver Chalice (1954) as Theron
- Moonfleet (1955) as Tewkesbury
- The King's Thief (1955) as Fell
- Rebel Without a Cause (1955) as Dr. Minton
- Sincerely Yours (1955) as Mr. Rojeck (uncredited)
- The Court-Martial of Billy Mitchell (1955) as President Calvin Coolidge
- Diane (1956) as Lord Tremouille
- Gaby (1956) as registrar
- Witness for the Prosecution (1957) as H. A. Carter
- Pollyanna (1960) as Mr. Neely
- The Lost World (1960) as Burton White
- All in a Night's Work (1961) as O'Hara
- The Wonderful World of the Brothers Grimm (1962) as Gruber
- Diary of a Madman (1963) as Pierre
- One Man's Way (1964) as Bishop Hardwick
- Games (1967) as Dr. Edwards
- The Wacky Zoo of Morgan City (1970) as Rev. Hodgins
- THX 1138 (1971) as PTO
- The Terminal Man (1974) as priest
- Homebodies (1974) as Mr. Loomis
- The Fortune (1975) as justice of peace
- I Wonder Who's Killing Her Now? (1975) as Philips the butler
- Mr. Sycamore (1975) as Abner / Arnie
- Mean Dog Blues (1978) as judge
- The Seniors (1978) as Mr. Bleiffer
- The Frisco Kid (1979) as Father Joseph
- Up the Academy (1980) as Commandant Causeway
- Reds (1981) as Mr. Partlow
- Jinxed! (1982) as Morley
- Creator (1985) as Prof. Brauer
- Checking Out (1989) as Mr. D'Amato
- Dick Tracy (1990) as forger (final film role)

== Partial television credits ==
- Bonanza, episode "The Avenger" (1960) as Ed Baxter; episode "Bank Run" (1961) as John J. Harrison; episode "The Many Faces of Gideon Flinch" (1961) as Gideon Flinch; episode "The Spotlight" (1965) as Amos
- The Twilight Zone, Season 5 Episode 8: "Uncle Simon" (1963), as Schwimmer
- The Fugitive, episode "Nightmare in Northoak" (1963), as Dr. Babcock
- The Invaders, episode "Doomsday Minus One" (1967), as Secretary Rosmundson
- Star Trek, Season 2 Episode 25 "Bread and Circuses" (1968), as Septimus
- Star Trek, Season 3 Episode 23: "All Our Yesterdays" (1969), as Mr. Atoz
- The Partridge Family, episode "Road Song" (1971), as Maggie's grandfather
- The Devil's Daughter (1973 film) - ABC television film, aired 9 January
- A Touch of Grace, episode "The Reunion" (1973)
- The Mary Tyler Moore Show, episode "Anyone Who Hates Kids and Dogs" (1975), as Grandfather
- Wonder Woman, episode "The New Original Wonder Woman" (1975), as Bank Manager
- Hawaii Five-O, episode "Retire in Sunny Hawaii - Forever" (1975)
- All In The Family, episode "Unequal Partners" (1977), as Herbert Hooper
- Barney Miller, Season 4, episode "Thanksgiving" (1977), as unnamed psyche-ward patient
- Taxi, Season 2, episode "Honor Thy Father" (1979), as the old man in the hospital
- WKRP in Cincinnati, episode "A Simple Little Wedding" (1981), "The Consultant" (1981), "Love, Exciting and New" (1982), "Up and Down the Dial" (1982) as Hirsch – Mrs Carlson's butler
- Barney Miller, episode "The Tontine" (1982), as Joseph Spidonie
- Cheers, episode "One for the Book" (1982), as Buzz Crowder
- Scarecrow and Mrs King, Season 3 Episode 15: "The Pharoah’s Engineer" (1986), as Rupert Simpson
