= One Sunday Afternoon (1933 film) =

1933 film by Stephen Roberts

- Swedish theatrical release poster
- Directed by: Stephen Roberts
- Screenplay by: William Slavens McNutt; Grover Jones
- Based on: One Sunday Afternoon; 1933 play by James Hagan
- Produced by: Louis D. Lighton
- Starring: Gary Cooper; Fay Wray
- Cinematography: Victor Milner; Karl Struss
- Edited by: Ellsworth Hoagland
- Music by: John Leipold
- Production company: Paramount Pictures
- Distributed by: Paramount Pictures
- Release date: September 1, 1933 (USA)
- Running time: 69 minutes
- Country: United States
- Language: English

One Sunday Afternoon is a 1933 American pre-Code romantic comedy-drama film directed by Stephen Roberts and starring Gary Cooper and Fay Wray. Based on the 1933 Broadway play by James Hagan, the film is about a middle-aged dentist who reminisces about his unrequited love for a beautiful woman and his former friend who betrayed him and married her. This pre-Code film was released by Paramount Pictures on September 1, 1933.

== Plot ==
Dr. Lucius Griffith "Biff" Grimes (Gary Cooper) is a small town dentist dissatisfied with his lot. Though married to the lovely and affectionate Amy Lind Grimes (Frances Fuller), Grimes still carries a torch for his former sweetheart, Virginia "Virgie" Brush Barnstead (Fay Wray). Years earlier, Grimes lost Virgie to his old friend Hugo Barnstead (Neil Hamilton). When the Barnsteads returned to town, Hugo gave Grimes a job in his carriage factory on condition that he spy on the other employees. Desperate for money because Amy's mother came to live with them, Grimes went to work there but refused to turn snitch. When Barnstead fired him, Grimes lost his temper and wrestled with a security guard, who was shot in the leg. Hugo blamed Grimes, who served two years in prison. Amy and her mother took in washing to survive. She lied to Grimes about it and spent her hard-earned money on a correspondence course in dentistry. In the present, Grimes is consumed with the desire for revenge. The now-wealthy Hugo has a dental emergency and comes to see Grimes, who—under the influence of several drinks with his buddy, Snappy—comes close to killing his old rival while administering a blend of nitrous oxide and oxygen. The story of their past is told in flashback while the anesthetic is taking effect. In the present, Biff turns off the oxygen—and Virginia appears. She is now a harridan who dresses and acts like a prostitute. Clearly she makes Hugo's life a misery. Grimes rushes to restore the oxygen and pulls the tooth. Barnstead comes to, oblivious to his close call and oblivious to the pass Virginia makes at Grimes, who cooly bids them good afternoon and tells Barnstead there is no charge. Amy comes in and gently scolds Grimes for drinking. Singing "In the Good Old Summer Time", he tells her she is very sweet and beautiful and he loves her, and sweeps her up in his arms.

== Cast ==
- Gary Cooper as Dr. Lucius Griffith "Biff" Grimes
- Fay Wray as Virginia "Virgie" Brush Barnstead
- Frances Fuller as Amy Lind Grimes
- Roscoe Karns as Snappy Downer
- Neil Hamilton as Hugo Barnstead, Owner Phoenix Carriage Factory
- Jane Darwell as Mrs. Lind, Amy's Mother
- Ed Brady as Pig Contest Emcee (uncredited)
- Robert Homans as Officer Charlie Brown (uncredited)

== Reception ==
The film was considered a box-office disappointment for Paramount.

Mordaunt Hall reviewed the film for The New York Times in September 1933, while the play was still running, and it suffered by comparison to the original:

Hollywood loses no time in picturing a good play...One might venture that the studio chieftains have been a little too hasty in this case, for, although the shadow conception of "One Sunday Afternoon" is not without merit, it often fails in the dramatic impact given in the original, especially in the closing episodes. Like the film versions of one or two other plays...There are periods that are unnecessarily short and others that do not deserve the footage they receive.

Leonard Maltin gives it three out of four stars, praising Cooper's performance in a "Touching and lovingly made piece of Americana, exuding period charm and atmosphere, though darker in tone than the two Warner Bros. remakes by Raoul Walsh: "

== Original and remakes ==
The hit play One Sunday Afternoon, starring Lloyd Nolan, ran on Broadway from Feb. 15 to November 1933. Written by James Hagan (1888–1947), it had great success beyond its Broadway run . The New York Times critic Brooke Atkinson called it "a light and charming little fable" and "uncommonly refreshing." It was translated into Yiddish and retitled One Sabbath Afternoon. A 1939 production of the Yiddish version also received high praise from The New York Times.

Film director Raoul Walsh made two versions, the smash hit Strawberry Blonde (1941) with James Cagney as Biff, and a Technicolor musical starring Dennis Morgan titled One Sunday Afternoon (1948). The version with Gary Cooper was a notorious flop; it was the only Cooper picture of this period to lose money at the box office. Before making the Cagney version, Jack L. Warner (co-founder of Warner Bros., who had bought the earlier version) screened the 1933 film and then wrote a memo to his production head Hal B. Wallis telling him to watch it: "It will be hard to stay through the entire running of the picture, but do this so you will know what not to do."

== See also ==
- List of Pre-Code films
