= Worthington Miner =

American actor (1900–1982)

- Born: November 13, 1900; Buffalo, New York, U.S.
- Died: December 11, 1982 (aged 82); Manhattan, New York City
- Occupations: Actor, director, producer, screenwriter
- Years active: 1933–1971
- Spouse: Frances Fuller (m. 1929; died 1980)
- Children: 3
- Relatives: Rachel Miner (granddaughter)

Worthington Miner (November 13, 1900 – December 11, 1982) was an American film producer, screenwriter, actor and director. He was married to actress Frances Fuller, with whom he had three children, including producer/director Peter Miner. He was the paternal grandfather of actress Rachel Miner.

== Career ==
Miner's direction of plays began with Up Pops the Devil in 1929. He went on to direct Reunion in Vienna, Both Your Houses, On Your Toes, Jane Eyre, and For Love or Money. He directed the 1935 Broadway production of Let Freedom Ring.

In 1939, after more than 10 years in the theater, Mr. Miner publicly criticized it as "highly undemocratic". At a Theatre Guild panel discussion in Williamstown, Massachusetts, he said: "When we speak of the theater, we speak of one city - New York. Yet even within the confines of that one city, the theater isn't democratic. It is a Park Avenue nightclub, a luxury for a selective few with the price of admission. It is for the rich in the richest city of this country, and I believe this situation is deplored by every author, actor and manager in the business."

One of Miner's early roles at CBS Television was producing At Home, a 1944-45 variety series. He also created and produced Studio One (serving as writer and director for numerous episodes); the television version of The Goldbergs; Mr. I Magination, a children's show, and The Toast of the Town, casting Ed Sullivan as master of ceremonies. He also produced The Play of the Week; Playhouse 90 and Kaiser Aluminum Hour. Miner realized that television could not 'be made to fit into preconceived patterns of motion pictures, theater or radio. Television offers, instead, a superlative opportunity to absorb every type of experiment in all other entertainment media,' he said, adding that 'there is no limit to the scope of its coverage.'

Miner died on December 11, 1982, in New York Hospital, aged 82.

== Selected filmography as a producer ==
- The Fool Killer
- The Pawnbroker

=== Television ===
- The Iceman Cometh
- Frontier
- Medic
- Studio One

== Selected filmography as an actor ==
- They Might Be Giants
