= Linda Marsh =

American actress

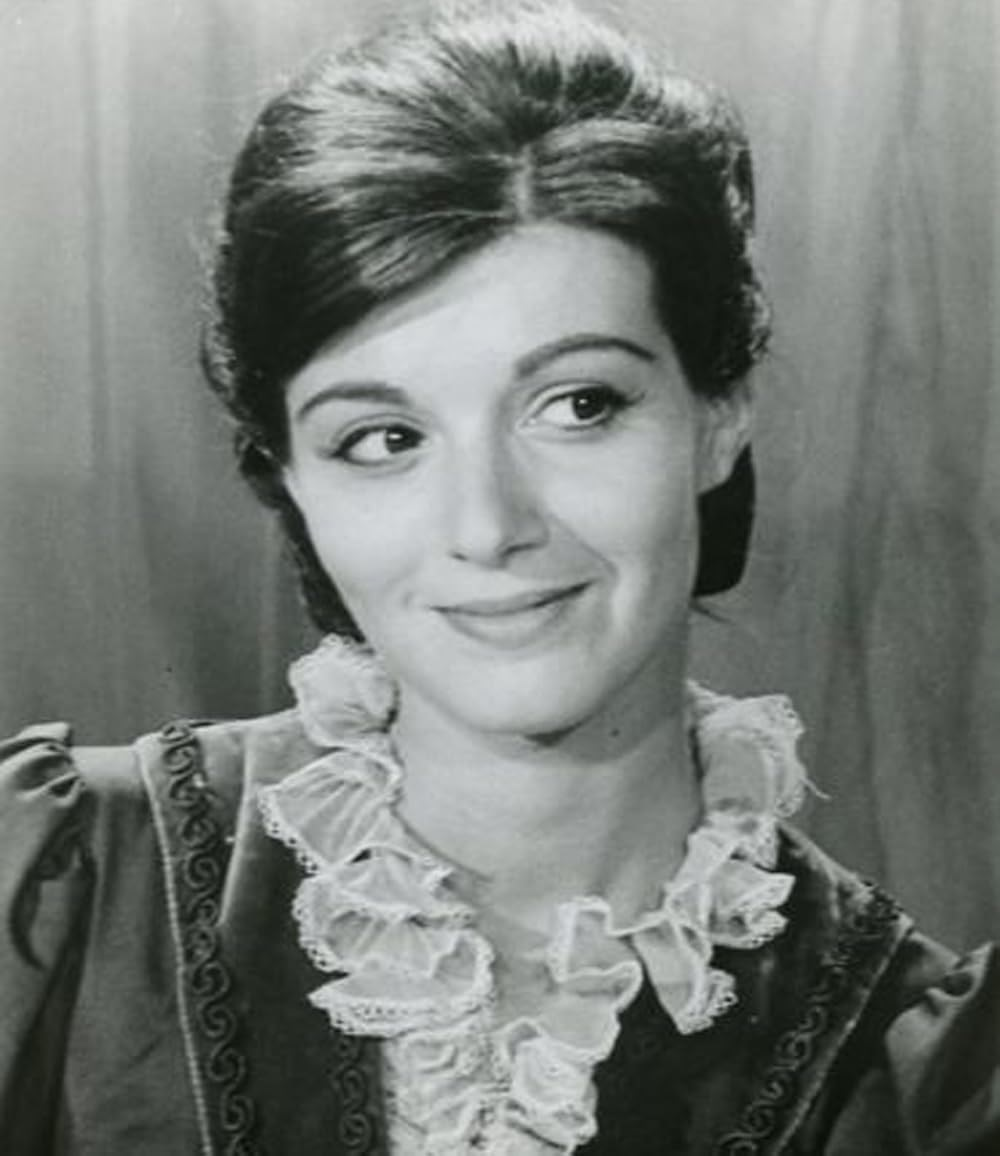
- Marsh in 1965
- Born: Linda Cracovaner; February 8, 1939 (age 87); New York City, New York, U.S.
- Spouse: Richard Sinatra (m. 1966; div. 1970)

Linda Marsh (born Linda Cracovaner; born February 8, 1939) is an American actress of film, stage, and television. She was nominated for a Golden Globe Award for her performance in Elia Kazan's 1963 film America, America.

== Early years ==
Marsh was born in New York City to Arthur Cracovaner, a physician, and Liska March, a former Ziegfeld dancer. She chose Marsh as her stage last name because the actors' union already had a Linda March as a member.

Marsh attended a private school in New York and Bennington College. She left Bennington after two years to pursue a career in acting.

== Career ==
Marsh became one of the actresses who were regularly romanced by the stars of TV series, including The Man From U.N.C.L.E. (S3E21, "The It's All Greek to Me Affair", 1967 Feb 03); I Spy; The Wild Wild West (S1E14, "The Night of the Howling Light", 1965 Dec 17); Mannix (S1E4, "The Many Deaths of Saint Christopher", 1967 October 7; It Takes a Thief (S1E11, "To Steal a Battleship", 1968 March 26); Hawaii Five-O (S02E07, "Sweet Terror," 1969 Nov 05; S03E07, "Forces of Waves," 1970 Oct 28; S12E06, "Image of Fear," 1979 Nov 08); and Daniel Boone (S6E19, "A Matter of Vengeance", 1970).

Among her early television appearances, she played Elizabeth Bacio, daughter of the title character, in the 1965 Perry Mason episode "The Case of the Sad Sicilian." In 1968, she had a major role playing Rachel in S1E8 of the TV series "Here Come the Brides." She also appeared as Nora in The Big Valley (S4E16, "The 25 Graves of Midas," February 3, 1969).

Marsh portrayed Susan Shelby Magoffin, the first woman to travel the Santa Fe Trail, in the 1965 episode "No Place for a Lady" on the syndicated television anthology series, Death Valley Days.

Marsh underwent a series of rhinoplasties following her early successes rather than changing her appearance before starting her career. She had more glamorous parts in the later 1960s. She was a frequent guest star on television into the 1970s, with her last credited roles in 1979.

Marsh's few film appearances included Che! (1969), Homebodies (1974) and Freebie and the Bean (1974). She had a supporting role in the television miniseries The Dark Secret of Harvest Home (1978).

Marsh won acclaim in Elia Kazan's film adaptation of his book America, America, playing a young woman who is betrothed to the story's ambitious main character but is abandoned in his quest to emigrate from Turkey to the United States. To play the characters in the epic film, which was loosely based on his uncle's life, the director said he chose actors who were Jewish (naming Marsh among them) or Greek because "all of them know oppression, they all have uncles from the 'Old World' and have an affectionate relationship towards their forebears."

In 1964 she played Ophelia in John Gielgud's celebrated Broadway production of Hamlet starring Richard Burton. Her Ophelia received mixed notices, but Gielgud liked her performance and resisted efforts to recast the part despite holding more auditions during rehearsals.

== Personal life ==
On April 3, 1966, Marsh married actor Richard Sinatra in Beverly Hills, California.

== Filmography ==
Linda Marsh film and television credits
Year	Title	Role	Notes
1963	America, America	Thomna Sinnikoglou	Film
1964	Hamlet	Ophelia	Film
1965	Perry Mason	Elizabeth Bacio	Episode: "The Case of The Sad Sicillan"
1968	Mannix	Rina	Episode: "The Many Deaths of Saint Christopher"
1968	Here Come the Brides	Rachel	Episode: "A Jew Named Sullivan"
1968	The Mod Squad	Louise Semple	Episode: "You Can't Tell the Players Without a Programmer"
1969	Che!	Tania	Film
1969	Marcus Welby, M.D.	Zoe Eugenides	Episode: "The Vrahnas Demon"
1969	Mannix	Suzan Ward	Episode: "Who Will Dig The Graves"
1969	Hawaii Five-0	Mariana de Nava	Episode: "Sweet Terror"
1970	Mannix	Winifred Hill	Episode: "Blind Mirror"
1970	Stop!	Lee	Film
1970	The Mod Squad	Ellie Myers	Episode: "Should Auld Acquaintance Be Forgot!"
1971	The F.B.I.	Mrs. Talbot	Episode: "Death on Sunday"
1971	Night Gallery	Mildred Squire	Segment: "The Phantom Farmhouse"
1972	Marcus Welby, M.D.	Nancy Darrow	Episode: "Jason Be Nimble, Jason Be Quick"
1972	Gunsmoke	Lucero	Episode: "Hidalgo"
1972	Gunsmoke	Lydia Walden	Episode: "Bohannan"
1972	The Mod Squad	Betty Ayres	Episode: "I Am My Brother's Keeper"
1973	The Mod Squad	Ruth Stringer	Episode: "And Once for My Baby"
1974	Homebodies	Miss Pollack	Film
1974	Freebie and the Bean	Barbara - Freebie's Girl	Film
1974	Harry O	Anne Virdon	Episode: "Accounts Balanced"
1975	Six Million Dollar Man	Barbara Thatcher	Episode: "Lost Love"
1975	Cannon	Alison Demorra	Episode: "The Setup"
1976	S.W.A.T.	Julia Abbott	Episode: "The Running Man"
1977	The Waltons	Fern Lockwood	Episode: "The Recluse"
