= Howard Kaminsky =

American publisher, author, and film producer (1940–2017)

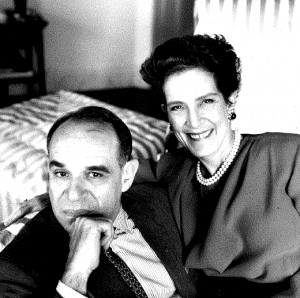
- Born: January 24, 1940; Brooklyn, New York, U.S.
- Died: August 26, 2017 (aged 77)
- Occupations: publisher, Author and Film producer

Howard Kaminsky (January 24, 1940 – August 26, 2017) was an American publisher, author and film producer who worked at both Hearst Book Group and the publishing giant Random House. He was the author of many thrillers and literary fiction novels and a screenplay. Kaminsky was responsible for launching the careers of several literary greats. He wrote and published thrillers and was active as a producer on avant-garde movies and documentaries.

== Early life and education ==
Kaminsky was born in Brooklyn on January 24, 1940.

After graduating from New Utrecht High School, Kaminsky earned a B.A. from Brooklyn College, and went on to study at San Francisco State, and the University of California, Berkeley.

== Career ==
After graduation, Kaminsky worked at a series of odd jobs in New York. He then worked for seven years as a Subsidiary Rights Director at Knopf, a division of Random House.

In 1968, Kaminsky met Susan Stanwood, a book and magazine editor for The Saturday Evening Post, and his future wife.

In 1971 Kaminsky briefly left publishing to write and produce movies. Along with Bennett Sims and Larry Yust, Kaminsky wrote the screenplay for the movie, Homebodies (1972), which premiered in the U.S. in September and was later released in Denmark, West Germany, Sweden, and Finland.

In 1972 Kaminsky returned to publishing, working for fourteen years as the President and Publisher of then called, Paperback Library. Kaminsky oversaw significant growth of the company. He changed the focus from the genre of pulp and western to that of literary fiction, also changing the name to Warner Books. Among the authors published were Norman Mailer, Richard Nixon, Sydney Sheldon, and Jackie Collins.

Kaminsky and Susan also began to co-write and publish a number of books. Their first publication, written under the pseudonym Brooks Stanwood, was titled, The Glow. Originally released in 1979, it was published in thirteen countries, was on the New York Times bestseller list, and sold well in France. It was also made into a movie of the same title, starring Portia De Rossi, Dean Cain, and Hal Linden.

In 1984, Kaminsky took the post of chief executive officer at Random House. Three years later, he gained the position of executive vice president, but shortly thereafter he left the company. Two months later he was offered the post of president of Hearst Corporation trade book group, Avon/ William Morrow and Company, as well as six lines of children's books Authors published during this time include Gore Vidal, Elmore Leonard, E.L. Doctorow, Umberto Eco, Edwin Torres, William Boyd, and David Halberstam.

After Hearst, Kaminsky became the Editor at Large at Doubleday & HarperCollins. He continued to write and publish with Susan. In addition to pseudonym published with The Glow, Howard and Susan also published under the name, Arthur Reid. The pseudonyms are said to be sourced from family names, the first, Brooks Stanwood, a nod to Howard’s first cousin, Mel Brooks.

Together they wrote five suspense novels with the atmosphere of film noir. In spite of the death of his wife Susan in March 2005, Kaminsky continued to publish thrillers. His novel Angel Wings, published by Thomas & Mercer, was released in bookstores in April 2013.

Kaminsy has co-written two books which are not thrillers, Magic Words and Magic Words at Work, with Alexandra Penney. These are self-help and advice books

Kaminsky produced the animated film, My Dog Tulip, a 2011 adaptation of the J. R. Ackerley memoir, written and directed by Paul Fierlinger, which explores the relationship between Ackerly and his German Shepherd. The film premiered in New York City at the non-profit film house, Film Forum.. It received Honorable Mention for Best Animated Film at the Ottawa International Animation Festival.

In 2014, Kaminsky, in collaboration with Ric Burns and Frank Pellegrino, is in production on a film titled, "The Two Popes", which examines the lives of the creator of The National Enquirer, Generoso Pope and his son, Generoso Pope Jr. He also contributes to the "Shouts and Murmurs" section of the New Yorker.

A member of Council on Foreign Relations since 1989, and formerly on the board of the Association of American Publishers and the National Book Foundation, Kaminsky lived in New York and Connecticut. He was 77 years old. He is survived by his daughter, Jessica Kaminsky, a TV writer who resides in Los Angeles with her husband, Dave Rock and two kids.
