= Frances Fuller =

American actress

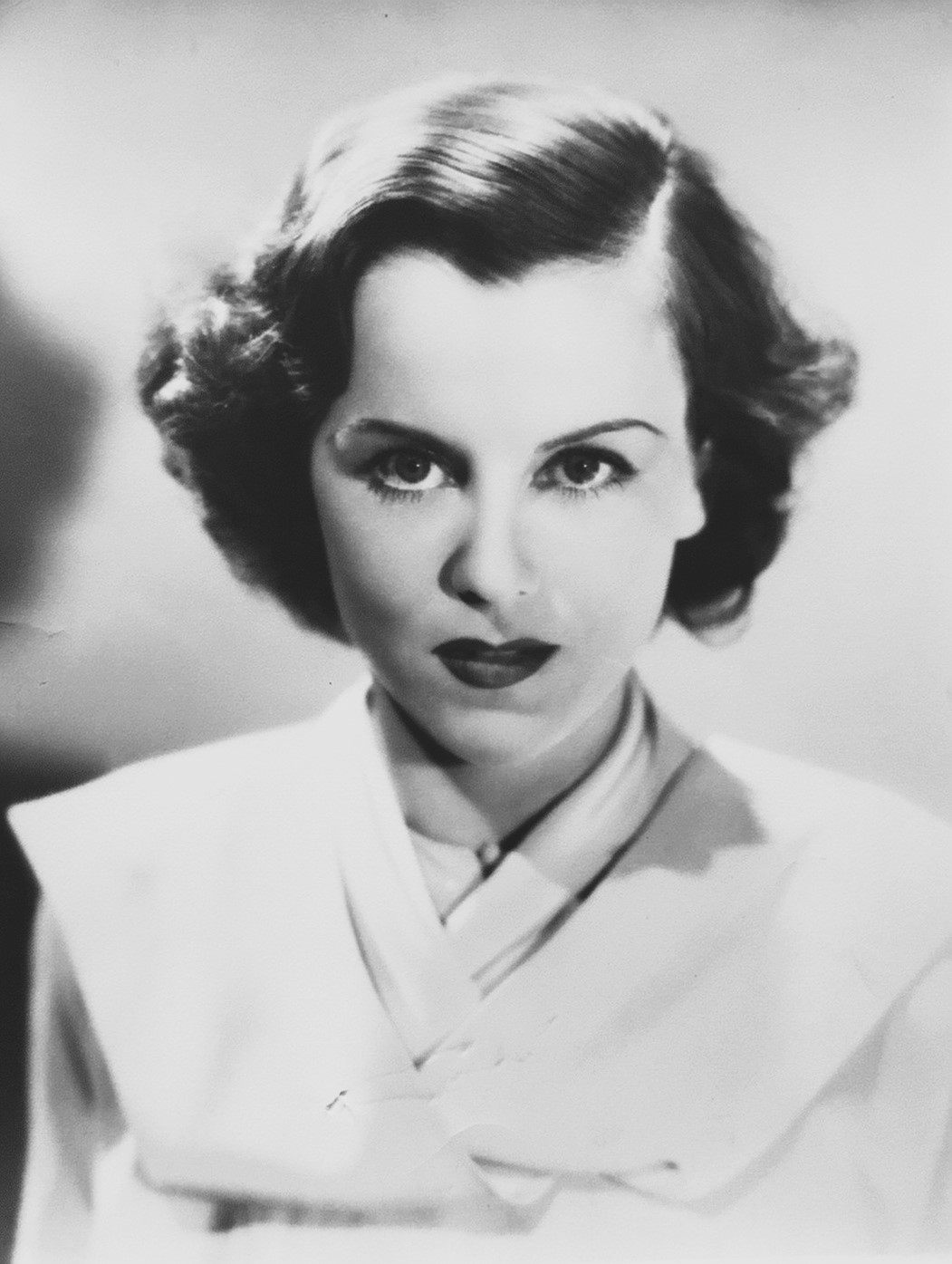
- Born: March 16, 1907; Charleston, South Carolina, U.S.
- Died: December 18, 1980 (aged 73); Manhattan, New York City
- Occupation: Actress
- Years active: 1933–1971
- Spouse: Worthington Miner (m. 1929)
- Children: 3
- Relatives: Rachel Miner (granddaughter)

Frances Fuller (March 16, 1907, in Charleston, South Carolina – December 18, 1980, in Manhattan, New York City) was an American actress. She is the grandmother of the actress Rachel Miner and the niece of the Supreme Court Justice and Secretary of State James Francis Byrnes (former Governor of South Carolina).

Fuller graduated from the American Academy of Dramatic Arts in New York City in 1928, and was the president and director there from 1954 to 1964, and director from 1964-1974. Her film career began with One Sunday Afternoon (1933).

Fuller's Broadway credits include The Lady of the Camellias (1963), Home Is the Hero (1954), Excursion (1937), Stage Door (1936), Her Master's Voice (1933), I Loved You Wednesday (1932), The Animal Kingdom (1932), Five Star Final (1930), Cafe (1930), and The Front Page (1928).

On television, Fuller was a member of the cast of A Flame in the Wind, a soap opera broadcast on ABC from 1964 to 1966.

Fuller was married to producer Worthington Miner, with whom she had three children, and appeared in many productions on Broadway during the 1930s.

== Filmography ==
Year	Title	Role	Notes
1933	One Sunday Afternoon	Amy Lind	
1934	Elmer and Elsie	Elsie Beebe	
1955	The Girl in the Red Velvet Swing	Elizabeth White	
1971	They Might Be Giants	Mrs. Bagg	
1974	Homebodies	Miss Emily	(final film role)
