= Deathmaster =

1972 American vampire horror film

- Directed by: Ray Danton
- Written by: R.L. Grove
- Produced by: Fred Sadoff; James H. Nicholson; Robert Quarry
- Starring: Robert Quarry; Bill Ewing; Brenda Dickson; John Fiedler; Betty Ann Rees; William Jordan; Le Sesne Hilton; John Lassell
- Cinematography: Wilmer C. Butler
- Edited by: Harold Lime
- Music by: Bill Marx
- Distributed by: American International Pictures
- Release date: 1972
- Running time: 85 minutes
- Country: United States
- Language: English
- Budget: $120,000

Deathmaster aka The Deathmaster is a 1972 American vampire horror film starring Robert Quarry.

== Background ==
With the Manson Murders being quite recent, Quarry wanted to make a Charles Manson-type vampire. Prior to this film, Quarry had played a vampire in Count Yorga, Vampire, released in 1970 and it’s sequel, The Return of Count Yorga, released in 1971.

Part of the film was shot in a house on the Hollywood Hills. In many of the film's scenes, real hippies were used and according to the book, What's His Name? John Fiedler by Elizabeth Messina, many of the hippies were on drugs. The film shows a period in time of the Topanga Canyon hippie counterculture community. Gary A. Smith suggests in his book, Vampire Films of the 1970s, that this may be the only filmed document of the scene in that period.

This film also was the feature film debut for television actress Brenda Dickson. Both Bobby Pickett who played Kirkwood and LeSesne Hilton who played Barbado were musicians. Pickett was known for the hit "Monster Mash", as well as a lesser hit "Graduation Day". Hilton, sometimes referred to as Le Sesne Hilton, had been one of the featured performers at the 1963 Pasadena Folk Festival and had provided music for Robert M. Quittner's 1966 film, Dropouts Anonymous. According to Robert Quarry, Hilton was the easiest to cast. They were looking for someone to play his mysterious and evil servant. They issued a casting call but didn't get a lot of people coming in due to them paying the bare minimum wage. Hilton walked through the door, and Quarry said "there's the first casting". Quarry said that Hilton was a nice fellow, very mysterious looking and very tall.

According to Psychotronic Video, the film cost $120,000 and was completed two days ahead of time.

The film had a brief run in theaters due to lack of promotion, and was licensed for television quickly, ending up in late-night slots.

According to the book Horror Film Stars, 3d Ed. by Michael R. Pitts, the film was originally called Khorda.

== Story ==
A coffin washes ashore and it is retrieved by Barbado, a mute manservant. Inside the coffin is Khorda, a vampire. He soon positions himself as a charismatic guru-like figure amongst a community of hippies, where he manages to exert an influence over them. Little do they suspect that his motives are sinister.

== Reception ==
The film was given one out of four stars by critic Roger Ebert.

In Irv Slifkin's VideoHound's Groovy Movies : Far-Out Films of the Psychedelic Era, the character Barbado is described as an irresistibly strange touch with his playing of the Zamfir-like tunes on a flute whenever the evil one appears.

In Jon Kitley's 30 April 2016 review, Robert Quarry's character Khorda was described as a kind of cross between Yorga and Charles Manson with long hair and a goatee, and Quarry was said to be excellent in his role as a vampire. He also wrote that while the rest of the cast was substandard, the very familiar John Fiedler was in the film as well as Betty Anne Rees and Bobby Boris Pickett of "The Monster Mash" fame in an uncredited role as a hippie. On the visual quality of the film, he wrote that it was excellent and mentioned the DVD extras; the 35mm theatrical trailer, trailers for Yorga, Vampire and Sugar Hill, as well as four different still galleries, radio spots, TV commercials. And there was also the audio commentary by Quarry himself, along with Fred Olen Ray, with a lot of interesting information about making the film.

The film was given two-and-a-half stars by Moria Reviews in May 2016.

The reviewer for Horror and Sons wasn't positive but wrote "It's a harmless way to kill 90 minutes".

The reviewer for Rue Morgue (pub. 23 Feb. 2019) wrote that the film carries over from the Yorga movies in an eerie and effective way of portraying vampires on screen. The reviewer also wrote that the end image in the film seemed to be a deliberate nod to the psychedelic film, The Trip by Roger Corman.

In the 2019 book, American International Pictures, A Comprehensive Filmography by Rob Craig, there was said to be more than a passing similarity between the hypnotic appeal of Khorda and the charisma of Charles Manson.

In his 2025 book, Art! Trash! Terror!, Chris Alexander writes that the film is "beautiful, arch, lyrical and weird and Quarry is simply amazing in it.".

== Issues ==
According to Vampire Films of the 1970s by Gary A. Smith, the title of the film was to be Guru Vampire. Following the completion of the film which was made without any issues, Robert Quarry invited Michael Macready, the producer of Count Yorga to a screening. Macready then got in contact with Samuel Z. Arkoff and told him that the film Quarry made had plagiarized Count Yorga. Quarry and company were then threatened with legal action by Zarkoff if they didn't agree to sell AIP the distribution rights to the film. The film was sold for a very small amount and ended up being shelved for nearly two years. It was poorly released as Deathmaster in August of 1972.

== Later years ==
For decades the film was almost forgotten until filmmaker Fred Olen Ray, who was a fan of the film, got a 35mm negative of it and released it on DVD via his own Retromdedia label. The negative obtained was the original camera negative. It is presented in 1.85:1 anamorphic widescreen and has a Dolby Digital 5.1 option.The bonus feature includes commentary by Ray and Robert Quarry.

== Cast ==
- Robert Quarry - Khorda
- Bill Ewing - Pico
- Brenda Dickson - Rona
- John Fiedler - Pop
- Bob Pickett - Kirkwood
- Betty Anne Rees - Esslin
- William Jordan - Monk
- Le Sesne Hilton - Barbado
- John Lasell - Detective
- Freda T. Vanterpool - Dancer
