= George Macready =

American actor (1899–1973)

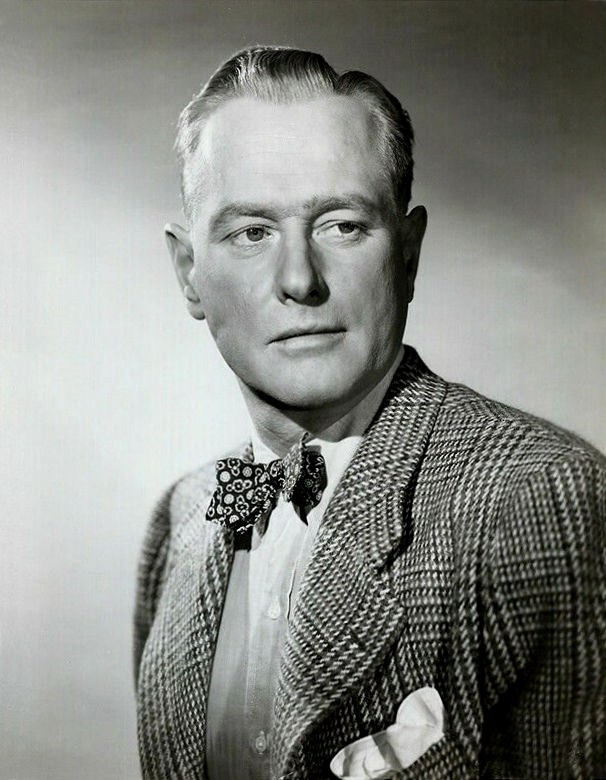
- Macready in Johnny Allegro (1949)
- Born: August 29, 1899; Providence, Rhode Island, U.S.
- Died: July 2, 1973 (aged 73); Los Angeles, California, U.S.
- Education: Brown University
- Occupation: Actor
- Years active: 1926–1973
- Spouse: Elizabeth Patterson (m. 1931; div. 1943)
- Children: 3
- Relatives: John Macready (grandson)

George Peabody Macready Jr. (August 29, 1899 – July 2, 1973) was an American stage, film, and television actor often cast in roles as polished villains, perhaps most notably in the 1946 film noir classic Gilda.

== Early life ==
Macready was born in Providence, Rhode Island on August 29, 1899. He claimed to be a descendent of the 19th-century English actor William Charles Macready, whose example he cited as the chief inspiration for his own pursuit of acting. He graduated from the local Classical High School and, in 1917, from Brown University where he studied Greek and mathematics.

Shortly thereafter, Macready suffered a disfiguring injury in a car accident, which, as the actor would later note, proved a mixed blessing: affording him a reliably steady supply of jobs, but only within a rigidly circumscribed range. As of October 1958, by Macready's own count, he had been cast as the "mastermind criminal" type in at least 65 of his 75 television and motion picture assignments. He explained:

Producers have found it effective to emphasize my rather nasty looking cheek scar, which I received in an auto accident many years ago.

== Acting career ==
=== Theatre ===
Macready made his Broadway debut in 1926, performing in the role of Reverend Arthur Dimmesdale in an adaptation of The Scarlet Letter. Through 1958, he appeared in fifteen plays, both drama and comedy, including The Barretts of Wimpole Street, based on the family of the English poet Elizabeth Barrett Browning.

Macready's penchant for acting was spurred in part by the director Richard Boleslawski. His Shakespearean stage credits included Benedick in Much Ado About Nothing (1927), Malcolm in Macbeth (1928), and Paris in Romeo and Juliet (1934). On film, he played Marallus in the 1953 film adaptation of Shakespeare's Julius Caesar. He also portrayed Prince Ernst in the original stage version of Victoria Regina (1936), starring Helen Hayes.

=== Film ===
Macready's first film was Commandos Strike at Dawn (1942), which starred Paul Muni. In Gilda (1946), Macready's character Ballin Mundson enters a deadly love triangle with characters played by co-stars Rita Hayworth and Glenn Ford. He again played opposite Ford several years later in the postwar adventure The Green Glove (1952).

Macready played the villain Younger Miles in the 1948 Randolph Scott film Coroner Creek. The following year, he played Marshal Sam Hughes in another Randolph Scott film, The Doolins of Oklahoma; he narrated the film as well.

In Stanley Kubrick's antiwar film Paths of Glory (1957), Macready portrayed the cold-hearted and self-serving French World War I General Paul Mireau, who is brought down by Kirk Douglas' character, Colonel Dax. He had worked with Douglas previously in Detective Story (1951), and later he appeared with Douglas in two more films: Vincente Minnelli's Two Weeks in Another Town (1962) and John Frankenheimer's Seven Days in May (1964). In 1965, he was cast in a rare comedy role as General Kuhster in Blake Edwards' film The Great Race.

One of Macready's last film roles was as United States Secretary of State Cordell Hull in Tora! Tora! Tora! (1970), a depiction of the events leading up to the Japanese attack on Pearl Harbor.

=== Television ===
Macready made four guest appearances on Raymond Burr's Perry Mason, including the role of murder victim Milo Girard in the 1958 episode "The Case of the Purple Woman". He was also cast regularly in such series as Four Star Playhouse, General Electric Theater, The Ford Television Theatre, Alfred Hitchcock Presents, Adventures in Paradise and The Islanders.

Macready performed in a variety of television series produced in the 1950s and 1960s, including many Westerns such as Bat Masterson, Bonanza, The Dakotas, Gunsmoke, Have Gun - Will Travel, The Rebel (once in the role of Confederate General Robert E. Lee), The Rifleman, Lancer, Laramie, Riverboat, The Rough Riders, Chill Wills's Frontier Circus, The Texan and Steve McQueen's Wanted: Dead or Alive. Also on TV, he was seen in episodes of The Outer Limits, The Twilight Zone, Boris Karloff's Thriller, Kentucky Jones, Get Smart with Don Adams, and The Man from U.N.C.L.E. with Robert Vaughn.

Macready was cast as Cyrus Canfield, a vengeful father searching for his runaway teenage daughter, played by Floy Dean, in the May 26, 1962, series finale of NBC's The Tall Man.

He played publishing magnate Glenn Howard in the TV movie Fame Is the Name of the Game (1966) starring Anthony Franciosa, but was replaced by Gene Barry in the role when the film was subsequently used as the pilot for the television series The Name of the Game with Franciosa, Barry, and Robert Stack revolving in the lead.

== Personal life ==
In 1931, Macready married actress Elizabeth Dana Patterson; they divorced in 1943.

An art collector, Macready was a partner with colleague Vincent Price in a Beverly Hills art gallery called The Little Gallery, which they opened in 1943. (Macready had played Price's brother on Broadway in Victoria Regina.) According to Lucy Chase Williams' book The Complete Films of Vincent Price, "In the spring of 1943 ... Price and Macready opened The Little Gallery in Beverly Hills. 'We rented a hole in the wall next door to Martindale's book shop and a very popular bar, figuring correctly that we'd catch a mixed clientele of erudites and inebriates.' Price and Macready saw the gallery not only as an indulgence of their own interests, but as a showcase for young artists, and a way to expose the general public to art and art appreciation. The establishment merited photos and two full columns in Newsweek magazine, but rent increases forced The Little Gallery to close after two years."

== Death ==
Macready died of emphysema on July 2, 1973. His body was donated to the UCLA School of Medicine.

== Filmography ==
| Year | Film | Role | Director | Notes |
|---|---|---|---|---|
| 1942 | Commandos Strike at Dawn | Schoolteacher | John Farrow | |
| 1944 | Follow the Boys | Walter Bruce | A. Edward Sutherland | |
| 1944 | The Story of Dr. Wassell | Dutch Army Captain | Cecil B. DeMille | uncredited |
| 1944 | Wilson | William McCombs | Henry King | uncredited |
| 1944 | The Seventh Cross | Bruno Sauer | Fred Zinnemann | |
| 1944 | The Soul of a Monster | Dr. George Winson | Will Jason | |
| 1944 | The Conspirators | Schimitt's Special Agent | Jean Negulesco | uncredited |
| 1944 | The Missing Juror | Harry Wharton / Jerome K. Bentley | Budd Boetticher (as Oscar Boetticher Jr.) | |
| 1945 | The Bandit of Sherwood Forest | Fitz-Herbert | George Sherman | |
| 1945 | A Song to Remember | Alfred de Musset | Charles Vidor | uncredited |
| 1945 | I Love a Mystery | Jefferson Monk | Henry Levin | |
| 1945 | The Monster and the Ape | Professor Ernst | Howard Bretherton | |
| 1945 | Counter-Attack | Colonel Semenov | Zoltan Korda | |
| 1945 | Don Juan Quilligan | District Attorney | Frank Tuttle | uncredited |
| 1945 | My Name is Julia Ross | Ralph Hughes | Joseph H. Lewis | |
| 1946 | The Fighting Guardsman | Gaston de Montrevel | Henry Levin | |
| 1946 | Gilda | Ballin Mundson | Charles Vidor | |
| 1946 | The Man Who Dared | Donald Wayne | John Sturges | |
| 1946 | The Walls Came Tumbling Down | Matthew Stoker | Lothar Mendes | |
| 1946 | The Return of Monte Cristo | Henri de la Roche | Henry Levin | |
| 1947 | Down to Earth | Joe Manion | Alexander Hall | |
| 1948 | The Swordsman | Robert Glowan | Joseph H. Lewis | |
| 1948 | The Black Arrow | Sir Daniel Brackley | Gordon Douglas | |
| 1948 | The Big Clock | Steve Hagen | John Farrow | |
| 1948 | Coroner Creek | Younger Miles | Ray Enright | |
| 1948 | Beyond Glory | Major General Bond | John Farrow | |
| 1949 | The Gallant Blade | General Cadeau | Henry Levin | |
| 1949 | Knock on Any Door | District Attorney Kerman | Nicholas Ray | |
| 1949 | Alias Nick Beal | Reverend Thomas Garfield | John Farrow | |
| 1949 | Johnny Allegro | Morgan Vallin | Ted Tetzlaff | |
| 1949 | The Doolins of Oklahoma | Marshal Sam Hughes | Gordon Douglas | |
| 1950 | The Nevadan | Edward Galt | Gordon Douglas | |
| 1950 | Fortunes of Captain Blood | Marquis de Riconete | Gordon Douglas | |
| 1950 | Rogues of Sherwood Forest | King John | Gordon Douglas | |
| 1950 | A Lady Without Passport | Palinov | Joseph H. Lewis | |
| 1950 | The Desert Hawk | Prince Murad | Frederick De Cordova | |
| 1951 | Tarzan's Peril | Radijeck | Byron Haskin | |
| 1951 | The Golden Horde | Raven the Shaman | George Sherman | |
| 1951 | The Desert Fox | General Fritz Bayerlein | Henry Hathaway | |
| 1951 | Detective Story | Dr. Karl Schneider | William Wyler | |
| 1952 | The Green Glove | Count Paul Rona | Rudolph Maté | |
| 1953 | Treasure of the Golden Condor | Marquis de St. Malo | Delmer Daves | |
| 1953 | I Beheld His Glory | Cornelius | | TV movie |
| 1953 | Julius Caesar | Marullus | Joseph L. Mankiewicz | |
| 1953 | The Stranger Wore a Gun | Jules Mourret | Andre de Toth | |
| 1953 | The Golden Blade | Jafar | Nathan Juran | |
| 1954 | Duffy of San Quentin | John C. Winant | Walter Doniger | |
| 1954 | Vera Cruz | Emperor Maximilian | Robert Aldrich | |
| 1956 | A Kiss Before Dying | Leo Kingship | Gerd Oswald | |
| 1956 | Thunder Over Arizona | Mayor Ervin Plummer | Joseph Kane | |
| 1957 | The Abductors | Jack Langley | Andrew V. McLaglen (as Andrew McLaglen) | |
| 1957 | Paths of Glory | Brigadier General Paul Mireau | Stanley Kubrick | |
| 1957 | Gunfire at Indian Gap | Mr. Jefferson | Joseph Kane | |
| 1959 | Plunderers of Painted Flats | Ed Sammpson | Albert C. Gannaway | |
| 1959 | The Alligator People | Dr. Mark Sinclair | Roy Del Ruth | |
| 1959 | Jet Over the Atlantic | Lord Robert Leverett | Byron Haskin | |
| 1960 | Family Classics: The Three Musketeers | | | TV movie |
| 1962 | Two Weeks in Another Town | Lew Jordan | Vincente Minnelli | |
| 1962 | Taras Bulba | Governor | J. Lee Thompson | |
| 1964 | Seven Days in May | Christopher Todd | John Frankenheimer | |
| 1964 | Dead Ringer | Paul Harrison | Paul Henreid | |
| 1964 | Where Love Has Gone | Gordon Harris | Edward Dmytryk | |
| 1965 | The Human Duplicators | Professor Vaughn Dornheimer | Arthur C. Pierce | |
| 1965 | Memorandum for a Spy | Graham Jutland | | TV movie |
| 1965 | The Great Race | General Kuhster | Blake Edwards | |
| 1966 | Fame Is the Name of the Game | Glenn Howard | Stuart Rosenberg | TV movie |
| 1969 | Night Gallery | William Hendricks | | TV movie, segment "The Cemetery" |
| 1969 | Daughter of the Mind | Dr. Frank Ferguson | Walter Grauman | TV movie |
| 1970 | Count Yorga, Vampire | Narrator | Bob Kelljan | |
| 1970 | Tora! Tora! Tora! | Cordell Hull | Richard Fleischer | |
| 1971 | The Return of Count Yorga | Professor Rightstat | Bob Kelljan | |

== Partial television credits ==
- The Living Christ Series ("Crucifixion and Resurrection" and "Triumph and Defeat", 1951) as Cornelius
- General Electric Theater (3 episodes) as Clive/Henry/Colonel
- Alfred Hitchcock Presents (1955–1957)
  - Season 1 Episode 2: "Premonition" (1955) as Douglas Irwin
  - Season 1 Episode 13: "The Cheney Vase" (1955) as Herbert Koether
  - Season 2 Episode 29: "Vicious Circle" (1957) as Vincent Williams
- Gunsmoke (1958) as Charlie Drain
- Perry Mason (1958–1963) (4 episodes) as Roscoe Pearce/Dr. Vincent Kenyon/Charles Slade/Milo Girard
- Bonanza ("A Rose for Lotta", 1959) as Alpheus Troy
- Tightrope! ("The Lady", 1959) as Latham Grant
- Have Gun – Will Travel ("Ambush", 1960) as Gunder – Blind Man
- The Rifleman (1958–1960) as Matt Wymerman/Judge Zephaniah Burton
- The Tall Man (1960–1962) (2 episodes) as Judge Roy A. Barlow/Cyrus Canfield
- Thriller ("The Weird Tailor", 1961) as Mr. Smith
- Bat Masterson (Tempest at Tioga Pass, 1961) as Clyde Richards
- Route 66 (Effigy in Snow, 1961) as Mr. Fontaine
- The Outer Limits ("The Invisibles", 1963, and "Production and Decay of Strange Particles", 1964) as Governor Lawrence K Hillerman / Dr. Marshall
- The Twilight Zone ("The Long Morrow", 1964) as Dr. Bixler
- The Alfred Hitchcock Hour (1964) (Season 2 Episode 25: "The Ordeal of Mrs. Snow") as Hillary Prine
- Peyton Place (1965–1968) as Martin Peyton
- Get Smart (1968) as Mr. Fitzmaurice
