= The Return of Count Yorga =

1971 American vampire horror film by Bob Kelljan

- Theatrical release poster
- Directed by: Bob Kelljan
- Written by: Bob Kelljan; Yvonne Wilder
- Produced by: Michael Macready
- Starring: Robert Quarry; Mariette Hartley; Roger Perry; Yvonne Wilder; Edward Walsh; George Macready; Walter Brooke
- Cinematography: Bill Butler
- Edited by: Laurette Odney; Fabien D. Tordjmann
- Music by: Bill Marx
- Production company: Peppertree Productions Inc.
- Distributed by: American International Pictures
- Release date: August 18, 1971 (Los Angeles)
- Running time: 97 minutes
- Country: United States
- Language: English

The Return of Count Yorga (originally titled Yorga Returns) is a 1971 American vampire horror film directed by Bob Kelljan and starring Robert Quarry, Roger Perry, Yvonne Wilder, George Macready in his final film role before his death in 1973, Rudy De Luca, Edward Walsh, and Craig T. Nelson in his feature film debut. It is the sequel to the 1970 film Count Yorga, Vampire.

The story features Quarry returning as the infamous vampire Count Yorga, along with his servant Brudah, both of whom have been revived by the supernatural Santa Ana winds. Actor Roger Perry, who had a lead role in the first film, appears again but as a different character.

== Plot ==
Cynthia Nelson, a teacher at an orphanage, prepares a fundraising costume party. Meanwhile, orphan Tommy wanders into the nearby cemetery and hears a voice giving orders to "rise." Then, vampire women rise from their graves. Tommy tries to escape but runs into Count Yorga.

At the party, Yorga surreptitiously bites one of the guests, Mitzi, and becomes infatuated with Cynthia. When people start noticing Mitzi's weakened state, Yorga leaves. At his manor, Yorga is greeted by his hulking valet Brudda and the vampires from the cemetery. Yorga sends them to Cynthia's house, where they attack her family. Tommy (who was staying there) is untouched, but remains under Yorga's power. Cynthia is subdued and carried to Yorga's residence. Due to his hypnotic suggestions, she has no memory of the attack. Yorga tells Cynthia that there was a car accident and that she was left in his care by her family. Yorga wants her to willingly become his bride, despite being warned by his live-in vampire witch that Cynthia will bring his end if she is not killed or vampirised soon.

The next morning, Jennifer, the Nelsons' mute maid, finds the bodies along with Tommy and calls the police. As she does this, Bruhda arrives and drags the corpses to a quicksand pit on Yorga's property. By the time the police arrive, all of the evidence has been cleared away, and Tommy claims that nothing has happened. Despite this, David Baldwin, Cynthia's fiancé, becomes suspicious. A nervous Jennifer, suspicious about Tommy's visits to Yorga's mansion, slaps him. This makes Tommy angry. Meanwhile, Yorga kills Mitzi's boyfriend, drains her of blood and turns her into a vampire.

Ellen's fiancé Jason is later lured to the mansion by Tommy, on the claim that he found Ellen. Jason is reunited with Ellen, who has also been made into a vampire. She mocks Jason before her fellow brides attack him. Jason breaks free, only to run into Yorga, who strangles him. Bruddah leaves Jason's body for the brides.

That evening, Tommy kills Jennifer with a knife. After learning of her death, David convinces Reverend Thomas and police detectives Lt. Madden and Sgt. O'Connor to begin a rescue-mission at Yorga's mansion. Reverend Thomas distracts Yorga while Baldwin, Madden and O'Connor search the manor, armed with sticks they can cross to ward off vampires. However, Thomas falls for Yorga's charms and reveals their scheme, alerting Yorga of danger. Tricked into walking into the pit, Thomas sinks to his death. Yorga awakens his brides while psychically calling Cynthia to him.

Baldwin splits from the detectives to expand the search and discovers Jason's corpse, covered in bite marks with an IV draining his remaining blood. Baldwin finds the half-mind-controlled Cynthia and attempts to escape. Brudda then nearly beats him. Falling into a suit of armor, Baldwin grabs a metal mace and knocks Brudda out with it.

Meanwhile, Madden and O'Connor come across Yorga's brides. The detectives shoot at them, to no avail. Trying to escape, they encounter Brudda and kill him. O'Connor is separated and bitten by the witch. Madden tries to save him but gets lured in by a voice from the shadows (thinking that it is Baldwin) and then killed by Tommy.

Yorga seals Baldwin and Cynthia's exit routes while his brides close in on them. Yorga takes Cynthia away and almost makes her his new bride when Baldwin appears, seemingly having escaped the brides. Yorga takes Cynthia to a balcony as Baldwin grabs a nearby battle-axe and chases the two. Yorga fights Baldwin, who seems stronger than before. Eventually, Yorga gains the advantage. Just as he is about to kill Baldwin, Cynthia's memories of the massacre resurface. Realizing that Yorga was responsible for her family's death, she strikes him with the battle-axe. Then, Yorga is thrown off the balcony by Baldwin and dies on the pavement below.

Cynthia hugs Baldwin, but then sees that his skin has turned pale and bite marks are on his face. He actually has been turned into a vampire by the brides. Baldwin bites Cynthia. Tommy later plays near the orphanage, seemingly still not his usual self.

== Cast ==
- Robert Quarry as Count Yorga
- Mariette Hartley as Cynthia Nelson
- Roger Perry as Dr. David Baldwin
- Yvonne Wilder as Jennifer Nelson
- George Macready as Prof. Rightstat
- Philip Frame as Tommy
- Rudy De Luca as Lt. Madden
- Edward Walsh as Brudda
- Craig T. Nelson as Sgt. O'Connor (billed as Craig Nelson)
- Tom Toner as Rev. Thomas Westwood
- Walter Brooke as Bill Nelson
- David Lampson as Jason
- Helen Baron as Mrs. Liza Nelson
- Karen Ericson as Ellen Nelson
- Jesse Welles as Mitzi Carthay (billed as Jesse Wells)

== Production ==
In one scene, Yorga is seen watching a Spanish-language version of The Vampire Lovers on his television.

== Planned sequel ==
A third Yorga film, which would have featured a broken Count Yorga living in Los Angeles' sewers and creating an army of undead street people, never materialised.

Though Count Yorga is referred to as "the Deathmaster" in publicity for this film, a later film called The Deathmaster, also starring Robert Quarry as a vampire, has no relation to the Count Yorga series.

== Release ==
The film was released theatrically in the US by American International Pictures in 1971.

The film was released on VHS home video (full screen format) in 1993 by Orion Home Video, which once held home video distribution rights to many titles in the American International Pictures catalog.

The film was given a second VHS release by MGM Home Entertainment in September 2000. It later was released on DVD by MGM in 2005 as part of its Midnite Movies series. The disc was a double-feature release, pairing the film with Count Yorga, Vampire.

When CBS ran the movie in the 1970s on its Friday Night Late Movie, the on-screen title was Yorga Returns.

== Reception ==
Howard Thompson of The New York Times panned the film as "a dull, amateurish vampire brew." Variety called it "a solid follow-up" to the original and "a handsome-looking film which rings the bell on both the shocker and satirical level." Gene Siskel of the Chicago Tribune gave the film three-and-a-half stars out of four, calling it "extremely frightening" and adding, "Persons familiar with the original will find the sequel better photographed, better acted and containing more mayhem a minute." Kevin Thomas of the Los Angeles Times wrote, "Those who saw 'Count Yorga' will be disappointed. Those who only see 'The Return' will wonder what all the fuss was about in regard to the original. In the first film comedy gave way to terror; in this self-conscious sequel the two elements tend to cancel each other out. The result is a pretty silly show." David Pirie of The Monthly Film Bulletin wrote that Count Yorga had been resurrected "with considerably more enterprise and panache than before." He praised the acting as being "of a generally high standard" and the castle set as "skilfully utilised to give the impression of a labyrinth of Borgesian proportions," though he criticized "a totally unnecessary and feeble attempt to make the Count into a sympathetic figure through such lines as, 'The most fragile emotion ever known has entered my breast.'"

== See also ==
- List of American films of 1971
