= William Elliott (actor, born 1934) =

American actor and musician (1934–1983)

- Born: William David Elliott; June 4, 1934; Baltimore, Maryland, U.S.
- Died: September 30, 1983 (aged 49); Los Angeles, California, U.S.
- Other name: Bill Elliott
- Occupations: Actor; musician
- Years active: 1968–1980
- Spouses: Dionne Warwick (m. 1966; div. 1967) (m. 1967; div. 1975)
- Children: 2, including Damon Elliott

William David Elliott (June 4, 1934 – September 30, 1983) was an American actor and jazz musician. He had a recurring role in Bridget Loves Bernie as Otis Foster and a recurring role as Officer Gus Grant in Adam-12. He also appeared in Elvis Presley's 1969 film Change of Habit.

== Background ==
Elliott was born in Baltimore, Maryland. He spent four years in the United States Navy as an electrician. He later worked for US Steel and left the job. He also turned down an opportunity to study at Massachusetts Institute of Technology, instead preferring to pursue his ambition of being a drummer.

He eventually formed his own music group. He married the background vocalist for the group, Dionne Warwick, in 1966. While at the home of Warwick's parents to ask permission to marry Dionne, Elliott was invited by her father to have a talk in the living room. Her father knew of Elliott's reputation as a ladies' man and, Warwick has stated, happened to be cleaning his gun then in preparation for a hunting trip.

Warwick and Elliott had two sons together, David and Damon. The couple divorced in 1967 but soon remarried. They divorced for a second time in 1975 and he died of a heart attack in 1983 at 49.

== Television work ==
An early appearance on television was in the series Dragnet. The episode Community Relations: DR-10 aired in 1968 and also featured Don Marshall, Rafer Johnson and O. J. Simpson in a minor role. In the early 1970s, Elliott had a recurring role as Otis Foster in the Bernard Slade-created show Bridget Loves Bernie which starred David Birney and Meredith Baxter. He also had a recurring role as Officer Gus Grant on the Adam-12 TV show.

== Film work ==
He had an early uncredited role as a revolutionary in the Jules Dassin-directed Uptight which was released in 1968. He then played the part of Robbie in the Elvis Presley film Change of Habit which was released in 1969. He subsequently appeared as Leon in The Old Man Who Cried Wolf which starred Edward G. Robinson. The film, released in 1970, also starred Percy Rodrigues and Martin Balsam. It was about an old man who witnessed a murder but nobody believed him. The next film he appeared in was a made-for-television movie, They Call It Murder, which starred Jim Hutton, Robert J. Wilke and Ed Asner. Elliott played the part of Deputy Bob Terry. He played the lead role in the Henry Hathaway film Hangup, released in 1974. In that film he played an honest police officer who comes to grief as he is in love with a drug addict played by Marki Bey. Because Warner Bros. would not distribute the film, Elliott took charge of it and it was eventually distributed by a lesser-known distributor and pushed as a Blaxploitation film. It failed at the box office and attracted a fair amount of criticism.

== Music ==
Elliott appears on the Together Again! album by Willis Jackson with organist Jack McDuff. His drumming can be heard on four tracks that were recorded in August 1960; three appeared on the "Cookin' Sherry" album in 1961 ("Mellow Blues", "Cookin' Sherry" and "Contrasts"), while the fourth, "Tu'gether", was not released until the "Together Again!" album in 1964. By 1961 he was backing organist DeeDee Ford along with saxophonist / flautist Joe Thomas. By 1962 Rhoda Scott had taken over for DeeDee Ford, and as the Rhoda Scott Trio the group released two albums – "Hey! Hey! Hey!" in 1962 and "Live! at the Key Club" in 1963. In 1964 Elliott and Thomas released their Speak Your Piece album. In 1974, it was announced in the August 3 issue of Billboard that Elliott was opening a studio at the location of the old Brooks Randall Motor Club site at Bronson Avenue and Sunset Boulevard. The studio, which featured recording facilities, a sound stage and both rehearsal and dressing rooms, was to cater to the motion picture and recording industry.

== Filmography (selected) ==
Film list
Title	Year	Role	Notes
Uptight	1968	Revolutionary	Uncredited
Change of Habit	1969	Robbie	
Where Does It Hurt?	1972	Oscar the Orderly	
Night of the Lepus	1972	Dr. Leopold	
Coffy	1973	Carter	
Hangup	1974	Ken Ramsey	

Television list
Title	Episode #	Role	Director	Year	Notes #
Dragnet 1967	Community Relations: DR-10	Alec Harper	Jack Webb	1968	Season 3, episode 3
Love, American Style	Love and the Only Child, Love and the Wig	Driver #2	Terry Becker, Bruce Bilson	1971	Only in Love and the Wig segment
Night Gallery	Death in the Family, The Merciful, Class of '99, Witches' Feast	3rd Trooper		1971	Only in Death in the Family segment
O'Hara, U.S. Treasury	Operation: Hijack	Les Williams	Sam Freedle	1971	
The Bold Ones: The New Doctors	Moment of Crisis	Admissions clerk	Michael Caffey	1972	
The Rookies	Concrete Valley, Neon Sky	Truck	Michael Caffey	1972	
Bridget Loves Bernie	Bridget Loves Bernie	Otis Foster	Richard Kinon	1972	Season 1, episode 1
Bridget Loves Bernie	A Funny Thing Happened on the Way to the Vatican	Otis Foster		1972	Season 1, episode 2
Bridget Loves Bernie	Wake Up We're Getting Married Today	Otis Foster		1972	Season 1, episode 3
Bridget Loves Bernie	The Last of the Red Hot Playwrights	Otis Foster		1972	Season 1, episode 4
Bridget Loves Bernie	Who's Watching the Store?	Otis Foster	Le Philips	1972	Season 1, episode 5
Bridget Loves Bernie	The Newlybeds	Otis Foster		1972	Season 1, episode 6
Bridget Loves Bernie	Happiness Is Just a Thing Called Moe	Otis Foster		1972	Season 1, episode 7
Bridget Loves Bernie	Bernie's Last Stand	Otis Foster		1972	Season 1, episode 8
Bridget Loves Bernie	How to Be a Jewish Mother	Otis Foster		1972	Season 1, episode 9
Bridget Loves Bernie	The Little White Lie That Grew and Grew	Otis Foster		1972	Season 1, episode 10
Bridget Loves Bernie	The In-Laws Who Came to Dinner	Otis Foster		1972	Season 1, episode 11
Bridget Loves Bernie	The Homecoming	Otis Foster		1972	Season 1, episode 12
Bridget Loves Bernie	You Are Cordially Not Invited	Otis Foster		1972	Season 1, episode 13
