= Booker Bradshaw =

American actor

Booker Talmadge Bradshaw
- Born: May 21, 1940; Richmond, Virginia, U.S.
- Died: April 1, 2003 (aged 62); Los Angeles, California
- Occupations: Record producer, actor, writer
- Children: 1

Booker Talmadge Bradshaw (May 21, 1940 – April 1, 2003) was an American record producer, film and TV actor, Motown executive, and television writer.

== Early life ==
Born in Richmond, Virginia, Bradshaw worked for his father, Booker T. Bradshaw Sr., president of Virginia Mutual Life Insurance Company; a former member of the Richmond School Board and a trustee of Virginia Union and Virginia State. Bradshaw, disillusioned and working at his father's life insurance company, went on to study at Harvard to earn a degree in English. There he honed his acting skills, and met folk singer/musician Joan Baez. In 1961, while a junior at Harvard, he applied his singing talents on The Original Amateur Hour television show with Ted Mack as a singer of folk songs, becoming a three-time winner, and participated in the national finals at Madison Square Garden. He graduated from Harvard in 1962 and had learned to speak three languages. Bradshaw then went on to play at Carnegie Hall, and in the early sixties he was given a full scholarship to study at the Royal Academy of Dramatic Art in London, England.

== Career ==
Bradshaw joined Motown Records in Detroit, Michigan, and became their international manager. He was in charge of The Supremes and The Temptations on their European tours. He ventured back to acting with John Ferald, school principal of The Royal Academy at the time, doing repertory work at Oakland University outside of Detroit.

Among his many television and movie roles, he was cast as Dr. M'Benga in two episodes of the original Star Trek series. He also acted in The Mod Squad, Bracken's World, and The F.B.I. TV series and the 1973 blaxploitation film Coffy. He was also an accomplished writer and wrote material for TV shows such as Planet of the Apes, Get Christie Love! and Columbo.

== Personal life and death ==
Bradshaw had at least one child, daughter Alaiyo Bradshaw.

Bradshaw died from a heart attack in Los Angeles, California, on April 1, 2003, a month before his 63rd birthday.

== Filmography ==
=== Film ===
Year	Title	Role	Notes
1969	Some Kind of a Nut	Sam	Uncredited
1970	Skullduggery	Smoot	
1970	The Strawberry Statement	Lucas	
1973	Coffy	Howard Brunswick	

=== Television ===
Year	Title	Role	Notes
1966	The Girl from U.N.C.L.E.	Prince Nicholas	Episode: "The Jewels of Topango Affair"
1966, 1968	Tarzan	Dr. B'Dula, Dr Kenneth Kiley	2 episodes
1968	Here's Lucy	First Couple Man	Episode: "Lucy, the Conclusion Jumper"
1968	Star Trek: The Original Series	Dr. M'Benga	Episode: "A Private Little War"
1968	The Mod Squad	Doc Lightener	Episode: "Bad Man on Campus"
1969	Star Trek: The Original Series	Dr. M'Benga	Episode: "That Which Survives"
1969	Julia	Matt Dixon	Episode: "Home of the Braves"
1969	Bracken's World	Floyd Emmons	Episode: "It's the Power Structure, Baby"
1969	The F.B.I.	Special Agent Harry Dane	2 episodes
1969, 1972	Insight	Stu, Wilson, Mr. Ghani	3 episodes
1970	The Name of the Game	Assagai Nakebe	Episode: "The Skim Game"
1972	The Mod Squad	George Cannon	Episode: "A Gift for Jenny"
1973	The Wide World of Mystery	Baxter Norris	Episode: "Murder and the Computer"
1977	I Am the Greatest: The Adventures of Muhammad Ali	Various roles	Series regular, voice role
1977	Five Weeks in a Balloon		TV movie, voice role
1981	Goldie Gold and Action Jack	Sam Grit	Recurring voice role
1983	Alvin and the Chipmunks	Various roles	Series regular, voice role
1986	Lazer Tag Academy	Draxon Drear	Series regular, voice role
1987	Alice Through the Looking Glass	The Centaur	TV movie, voice role

=== Writing credits ===
Year	Title	Notes
1973	Tenafly	Episode: "Joyride to Nowhere"
1973	Roll Out	Episode: "Members of the Wedding"
1973	Wide World of Mystery	Episode: "Murder and the Computer"
1974	Firehouse	Episodes: "The Hottest Place in Town" and "Randall's Pride"
1974	Planet of the Apes	Episode: "The Horse Race"
1974	Get Christie Love!	Episode: "Bullet from the Grave"
1975	McMillan & Wife	Episode: "Night Train to L.A."
1975	Columbo	Episode: "Playback"
1975	Lucas Tanner	Episodes: "What's Wrong with Bobbie?" and "Requiem for a Son"
1976	McCoy	Episode: "In Again, Out Again"
1976	Ellery Queen	Episode: "The Adventure of the Eccentric Engineer"
1976	The Jeffersons	Episode: "Lionel's Pad"
1976	Good Times	Episodes: "Grandpa's Visit"
1977	I Am the Greatest: The Adventures of Muhammad Ali	
1977	The Rockford Files	Episode: "Beamer's Last Case"
1977	The Richard Pryor Show	4 episodes
1978	Redd Foxx	
1981-1983	Gimme a Break!	Episodes: "A Man in Nell's Room", "Nell Goes Home", "Love, Kidney"
1982	Diff'rent Strokes	Episodes: "Dreams"
1984	Mister T	Episodes: "Mystery of the Black Box"
