= Frank J. Urioste =

American film editor

Frank Joseph Urioste (born April 28, 1938) is an American film editor with about 30 film credits. He has been nominated three times for the Academy Award for Best Film Editing, for RoboCop (1987), Die Hard (1988), and Basic Instinct (1992).

== Early life ==
Urioste was born to Frank T. Urioste and Angelina "Angie" Saracino (1909–2006). He also has a sister, Carol. His father worked as an airplane bomb sight manufacturer during World War II, and shortly afterwards started at MGM, where he was a music editor for over 30 years.

== Career ==
Urioste began his career in 1957, when he worked with Henry Mancini at MGM as a music editor.

The first film that Urioste edited was What Ever Happened to Aunt Alice? (1969). He continued to edit films during the 1970s, such as Midway (1976), Damnation Alley (1977) and The Boys in Company C (1978). Urioste has also worked in television; in 1979, he edited the television film, I Know Why the Caged Bird Sings. In 1974, he edited the film The Spikes Gang. In 1979, he edited Fast Break.

In 1983, he edited Amityville 3-D. That same year, Urioste edited Trenchcoat, starring Margot Kidder and Robert Hays. Other films that Urioste edited during the 1980s include Conan the Destroyer (1984), Die Hard (1988) and Road House (1989). He also edited The Hitcher (1986), starring Rutger Hauer. Urioste was nominated for an Academy Award for his editing in Die Hard.

Urioste has also collaborated with director Paul Verhoeven in such films as RoboCop (1987), Total Recall (1990) and Basic Instinct (1992).

In 1993, Urioste edited Cliffhanger. That same year, he edited the film, Tombstone. In 1995, he co-edited Cutthroat Island. In 1996, he co-edited the film, Executive Decision, starring Kurt Russell.

Urioste used Avid Technology for the first time when he had less than four weeks to edit Lethal Weapon 4 (1998).

In addition to film editing, Urioste has been the senior vice president of feature development at Warner Bros. since 1998. Urioste also served on the board of governors of the Academy of Motion Picture Arts & Sciences from 1994 to 1997 and is on the advisory board of the film editors branch of the Academy.

Urioste received the American Cinema Editors Career Achievement Award in 2007.

== Personal life ==
He is married to Gemma Urioste. Together, they have had four children; Rosemarie, Maryan, Michelle, and Frank Jr. He has 10 grandchildren, and all celebrated his lifetime achievement at the Eddie Awards.

== Filmography ==
Year	Title	Director	Notes
1969	What Ever Happened to Aunt Alice?	Lee H. Katzin	
1971	The Grissom Gang	Robert Aldrich	
1972	The Hoax	Robert Anderson	
1972	Get to Know Your Rabbit	Brian De Palma	
1974	The Spikes Gang	Richard Fleischer	
1976	Midway	Jack Smight	
1977	Damnation Alley	Jack Smight	
1978	The Boys in Company C	Sidney J. Furie	
1979	Fast Break	Jack Smight	
1980	Loving Couples	Jack Smight	
1982	The Entity	Sidney J. Furie	
1983	Trenchcoat	Michael Tuchner	
1983	Amityville 3-D	Richard Fleischer	
1984	Conan the Destroyer	Richard Fleischer	
1985	Red Sonja	Richard Fleischer	
1986	The Hitcher	Robert Harmon	
1987	RoboCop	Paul Verhoeven	Nominated- Academy Award for Best Film Editing
1988	Die Hard	John McTiernan	Nominated- Academy Award for Best Film Editing
1989	Road House	Rowdy Herrington	
1990	Total Recall	Paul Verhoeven	
1992	Basic Instinct	Paul Verhoeven	Nominated- Academy Award for Best Film Editing
1993	Cliffhanger	Renny Harlin	
1993	Tombstone	George P. Cosmatos	
1994	Terminal Velocity	Deran Sarafian	
1995	Cutthroat Island	Renny Harlin	
1996	Executive Decision	Stuart Baird	
1997	Conspiracy Theory	Richard Donner	
1998	Lethal Weapon 4	Richard Donner	
1999	Deep Blue Sea	Renny Harlin	
2011	The Thing	Matthijs van Heijningen Jr.	Additional editor
