= Betty Anne Rees =

American TV and film actress (1943–2024)

- Born: 14 April 1943; Shaker Heights, Ohio, USA
- Died: 3 June 2024 (aged 81); Hemet, California, USA
- Occupation: Actress
- Years active: 1960s - 1970s

Betty Anne Rees (April 14, 1943 – June 3, 2024) was an American television and film actress active in the 1970s. She was known for her roles in Sugar Hill (1974), Unholy Rollers (1972), and My Three Sons.

== Life ==
Rees was born in Shaker Heights, Ohio, on April 14, 1943. In 1961, she graduated from Shaker Heights High School and then enrolled in the University of Miami. She later studied acting at Pasadena Playhouse. While living in New York, she was a roommate of fellow actress Caroline McWilliams.

Rees died in her home in Hemet, California, on June 3, 2024, at the age of 81.

== Career ==
She played the recurring character of Janet Ingram, Steve Douglas's secretary, on the final season of My Three Sons. The character had previously been played by Abby Dalton for one episode.

Rees appeared as Cora Hayden in the Mannix episode " With Intent to Kill" that was aired on 23 January 1971.

In 1973, Rees portrayed S.A. Joyce Hanafin, the first female agent featured on the television series The F.B.I.

After leaving acting, Rees began working for Gloria Marshall Figure Salons, a chain of weight loss centers, and designed kitchens.

== Filmography ==
Television
Title	Episode	Role	Director	Year	Notes
General Hospital		Margaret Colson		1975	

Film
Title	Role	Director	Year	Notes
The Cool Ones	Girl on Tony's staff	Gene Nelson	1967	uncredited role
Banning	Girl in car	Ron Winston	1967	uncredited role
Deathmaster	Esslin	Ray Danton	1972	
Unholy Rollers	Mickey	Vernon Zimmerman	1972	
Sugar Hill	Celeste	Paul Maslansky	1972	
The Photographer	Karri Stephenson	William Byron Hillman	1974	
