= Zara Cully =

American actress (1892–1978)

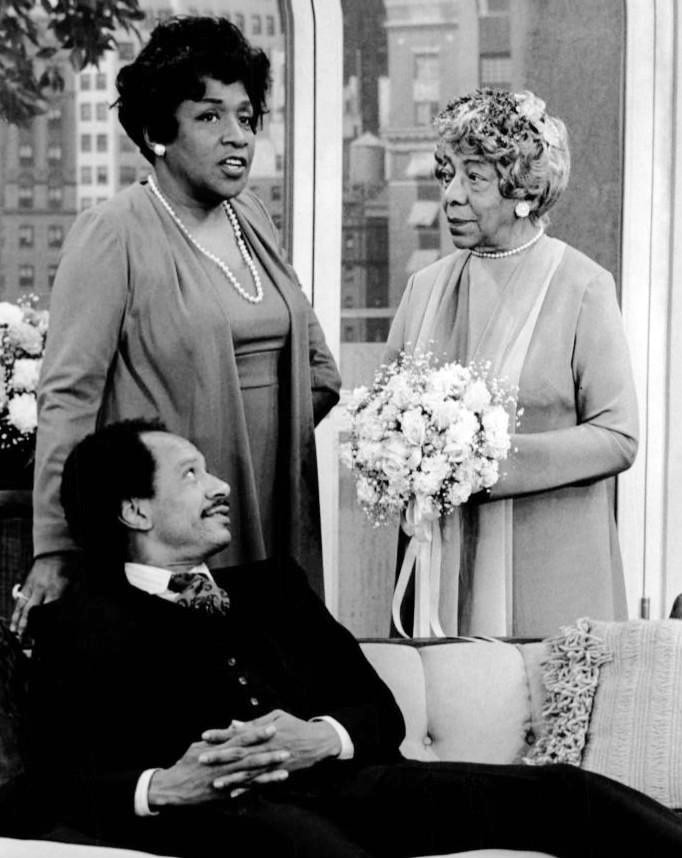
- Cully (right) as Mother Jefferson on the CBS sitcom The Jeffersons, 1975
- Born: January 26, 1892; Worcester, Massachusetts, U.S.
- Died: February 28, 1978 (aged 86); Los Angeles, California, U.S.
- Resting place: Forest Lawn Memorial Park (Glendale, California)
- Other name: Zara Cully–Brown
- Occupation: Actress
- Years active: 1919–1978
- Known for: Mother Jefferson – The Jeffersons
- Spouse(s): James M. Brown, Jr. (m. 1914; died 1968)
- Children: 4

Zara Frances Cully (January 26, 1892 – February 28, 1978) was an American actress. Cully was best known for her role as Olivia "Mother Jefferson" Jefferson in the CBS sitcoms All in the Family and The Jeffersons. In the latter, she portrayed the character of George Jefferson's mother from 1975 until her death in 1978.

== Early life and education ==
Zara Frances Cully was the eldest of 10 surviving children born to Ambrose E. and Nora Ann (née Gilliam) Cully in Worcester, Massachusetts, on January 26, 1892. The Cully family was musical with Ambrose serving as the music director of the church they attended, Zion AME Church. Zara's younger brother, jazz trumpeter Wendell Cully, played with Cab Calloway and Duke Ellington. She graduated from the Worcester School of Speech and Music.

== Career ==
In 1940, after an appearance in New York City, she became known as "one of the world's greatest elocutionists". After moving to Jacksonville, Florida, she began producing, writing, directing, and acting in numerous plays. For 15 years she was a drama teacher at her own studio as well as at Edward Waters College, a historically black college founded in 1866 to educate freed slaves. She had become known as Florida's "Dean of Drama." Upset by the racism she experienced in the Jim Crow-era South, Cully decided to move to Hollywood, where she became a regular performer at the Ebony Showcase Theatre.

By the time she acquired the role of 'Mother' Jefferson, Cully had accumulated a long list of acting credentials spanning a half-century, including such movies as The Liberation of L.B. Jones (1970), a starring role in Brother John (1971), and the Blaxploitation films Sugar Hill (1974) and Darktown Strutters (1975). Her TV career went back to what critics call 'the Golden Age of Television', including appearances on the highly acclaimed Playhouse 90 series. Aside from The Jeffersons, her television credits included The People Next Door (CBS Playhouse), Run for Your Life (NBC Matinee Theater), Cowboy in Africa, The Name of the Game, Mod Squad, Night Gallery, and All in the Family (in a 1974 appearance in which she originated the "Mother Jefferson" role, which she then carried over to The Jeffersons, when that show spun off). At 86, she was one of the oldest performers active in television at the time of her death.

=== The Jeffersons (1975–1978) ===
Cully's first appearance as 'Mother' Olivia Jefferson was in a guest appearance on an episode of All in the Family entitled "Lionel's Engagement" which aired February 9, 1974. She was 82 years old at the time. All three actors who portrayed Tom, Helen, and Jenny Willis on that episode were replaced with different actors by the time The Jeffersons became a spin-off on January 18, 1975, but producers retained Cully as Mother Jefferson. During the first 17 episodes of the third season of The Jeffersons, she was absent due to a severe case of pneumonia caused by a collapsed lung. Upon her recovery she returned to the show. Her last credited performance was an appearance in the ninth episode of the fourth season entitled "The Last Leaf", which aired November 12, 1977, three months before her death. No special episode was created to center on her death, but it was addressed in the second episode of the fifth season entitled "Homecoming (pt 1)", which aired September 27, 1978, seven months after her death.

== Personal life and death ==
Cully was married once, to James M. Brown Jr. from 1914 until his death in 1968. Together, Cully and Brown had four children: Mrs. Mary Gale "Polly" Buggs (wife of John A. Buggs, deputy director of the U.S. Civil Rights Commission, 1917–2005), Emerson T. Brown, James M. Brown III, and a baby daughter. Cully died at the Cedars-Sinai Medical Center in Los Angeles on February 28, 1978, from lung cancer, aged 86. Services were held on March 2, 1978, at the Church of Christian Fellowship, in Los Angeles. She was interred at Forest Lawn Memorial Park (Glendale) in the Freedom Mausoleum, Columbarium of Victory. In attendance were the cast and crew of The Jeffersons, including show producer Norman Lear. Cully was posthumously awarded an NAACP special Image Award on June 9, 1978, at the 11th Annual NAACP Awards ceremony.

== Filmography ==
Year	Title	Role	Notes
1970	The Liberation of L.B. Jones	Mama Lavorn	
1970	WUSA	White Haired Woman	
1970	The Great White Hope	Mrs. Jefferson's Friend	Uncredited
1971	Brother John	Miss Nettie	
1974	Sugar Hill	Mama Maitresse	
1975	Darktown Strutters	Lorelai	
1975-1978	The Jeffersons	Mother Jefferson	
