= Hangup =

1974 film by Henry Hathaway

Hangup aka Super Dude
- Theatrical release poster
- Directed by: Henry Hathaway
- Written by: Lee Lazich; Albert Maltz
- Based on: The Face of Night by Bernard Brunner
- Starring: William Elliott; Marki Bey; Cliff Potts
- Cinematography: Robert B. Hauser
- Edited by: Chris Kaeselau
- Music by: Tony Camillo
- Production company: Brut Productions
- Distributed by: Warner Bros.; Dimension Pictures (1975 release)
- Release date: October 1, 1974
- Running time: 94 minutes
- Country: United States
- Language: English

Hangup, also called Hang Up and later released under the name Super Dude, is a 1974 film directed by Henry Hathaway. It stars William Elliott and Marki Bey. This was the last film directed by Hathaway.

The film falls in the blaxploitation subgenre of "vigilante group cleans up ghetto streets". The film follows a black policeman seeking revenge on the man who got his girlfriend addicted to heroin. The film was distributed by American International Pictures, one of the many films it targeted to the new youth market. Josiah Howard states that the marketing "almost makes it look like a spoof of the genre." Howard described the film as "low budget and flashy, but fast-moving and consistently entertaining." Leonard Maltin wrote "Hathaway has done many fine films, but this, his last, isn't one."

== Cast ==
- William Elliott as Ken
- Cliff Potts as Lou
- Marki Bey as Julie
- Jerry Ayres as Jerry
- Wally Taylor as Sergeant Becker
- Barbara Baldavin as Beverly
- Morris Buchanan as Dave
- Rafael Campos as "Longnose"
- Bob Delegall as Jennings
- George Murdock as Captain Gorney
- Louie Elias as Detective
- Duffy Hambleton as Detective
- Mark Russell as Detective
- Lynn Hamilton as Mrs. Ramsey
- Herbert Jefferson, Jr. as Ben
- Michael Lerner as Richards
- Timothy Blake as Gwen

== See also ==
- List of American films of 1974
