= Korg: 70,000 B.C. =

- Complete Series DVD cover
- Genre: Adventure; Prehistoric fiction
- Created by: Fred Freiberger
- Directed by: Irving J. Moore; Christian Nyby
- Starring: Jim Malinda; Bill Ewing; Naomi Pollack; Christopher Man
- Narrated by: Burgess Meredith
- Theme music composer: Hoyt Curtin
- Country of origin: United States
- Original language: English
- No. of seasons: 1
- No. of episodes: 19

Production
- Executive producers: Joseph Barbera; William Hanna
- Producers: Fred Freiberger; Dick O'Connor
- Editor: Warner E. Leighton
- Running time: 30 minutes
- Production company: Hanna-Barbera Productions

Original release
- Network: ABC
- Release: September 7, 1974 – August 30, 1975

Korg: 70,000 B.C. is a 30-minute Saturday morning live-action television series created by Fred Freiberger and produced by Hanna-Barbera Productions; it was broadcast on ABC from September 7, 1974, to August 30, 1975.

== Plot ==
Korg featured the adventures of a family of Neanderthals during the Ice Age. It was intended to be educational, and was based on the best then-current research about Neanderthal life; however, some situations had to be watered down for a young audience. Actor Burgess Meredith supplied the narration.

== Cast ==
- Burgess Meredith as the narrator
- Jim Malinda as Korg
- Bill Ewing as Bok
- Naomi Pollack as Mara
- Christopher Man as Tane
- Charles Morteo as Tor
- Janelle Pransky as Ree

== Production ==
The American Museum of Natural History and The Los Angeles County Museum of Natural History served as consultants to the series.

The series was one of three "serious" programs ABC aired on its Saturday morning slate in 1974, along with the animated family dramas Devlin and These Are The Days. All three shows were major failures in the ratings and were cancelled by January 1975 (although Korg continued in re-runs through August).

== Episodes ==
No.	Title	Original release date
1	"The Blind Hunter"	September 7, 1974
2	"The Exile"	September 14, 1974
3	"The Big Water"	September 21, 1974
4	"The Eclipse of the Sun"	September 28, 1974
5	"Trapped"	October 5, 1974
6	"The Story of Lumi"	October 12, 1974
7	"The Running Fight"	October 19, 1974
8	"The Beach People"	October 26, 1974
9	"The Ancient One"	November 2, 1974
10	"Tor's First Hunt"	November 9, 1974
11	"Magic Claws"	November 16, 1974
12	"The Hill People"	November 23, 1974
13	"The River"	November 30, 1974
14	"The Web"	December 7, 1974
15	"The Picture Maker"	December 14, 1974
16	"Ree and the Wolf"	December 21, 1974
17	"Bok Loses Courage"	December 28, 1974
18	"Moving Rock"	January 4, 1975
19	"The Guide"	January 18, 1975

== Home media ==
The complete series was released by Warner Archive on December 11, 2012.

== Merchandise ==
A board game of the same title was produced by the US toy company Milton Bradley as a direct tie-in. Charlton Comics published a Korg comic book from May 1975 to November 1976 (well after the show had left the air). The series was written and drawn by Pat Boyette, and lasted nine issues.
