= The Hoax (1972 film) =

- Theatrical release poster
- Directed by: Robert Anderson
- Written by: Kevin Davis
- Produced by: Robert Anderson
- Starring: Bill Ewing; Frank Bonner; Jacques Aubuchon; Sharon DeBord; Don Dubbins; Harriet Gibson
- Cinematography: Ray Martin
- Edited by: Frank J. Urioste
- Music by: John Toll
- Production companies: Tempo Enterprises; Centurion Productions, Inc.
- Distributed by: All-Scope International
- Release date: April 19, 1972
- Running time: 85 minutes
- Country: United States
- Language: English

The Hoax is a 1972 American comedy film directed by Robert Anderson, and starring Bill Ewing, Frank Bonner, Jacques Aubuchon, Sharon DeBord, Don Dubbins, Harriet Gibson and Tom Benko. The film was released by All-Scope International on April 19, 1972.

== Plot ==
Two scheming ne'er-do-wells find a lost nuclear weapon in the ocean near Los Angeles. They decide to light-heartedly try and blackmail the city by asking for money from each citizen. This arouses the attention of the local authorities.

== Cast ==
- Bill Ewing as Cy McCarten
- Frank Bonner as Clete Dempsey
- Jacques Aubuchon as Chief Belkins
- Sharon DeBord as Gracie
- Don Dubbins as Sergeant O'Roherty
- Harriet Gibson as Mrs. Petrucci
- Tom Benko as Engineer
