= Yvonne Wilder =

American actress (1937–2021)

- Othon (later Wilder), from a 1962 newspaper
- Born: Yvonne Othon; September 21, 1937; New York City, New York, U.S.
- Died: November 24, 2021 (aged 84); Los Angeles, California, U.S.
- Occupation: Actress
- Years active: 1959–1993

Yvonne Wilder (born Yvonne Othon, September 21, 1937 – November 24, 2021) was an American actress, comedian, writer, and artist. She appeared in West Side Story on stage and in the 1961 film, and had a busy career in American television from the 1960s into the 1990s.

== Early life ==
Yvonne Othon was born in the Bronx, New York City. Her parents were from Cuba and Puerto Rico, but Othon did not learn to speak Spanish as a child. She attended the High School for Performing Arts, with further training at the Royal Academy of Dramatic Art in London.

== Career ==
As a young actress and dancer, Yvonne Othon appeared in shows starring Imogene Coca and Carol Burnett. While she was studying in London, Othon appeared in a West End production of West Side Story, and later played Anita in the first international touring company of the show. Othon's first screen credit was as Consuelo in West Side Story (1961). She and Rita Moreno were among the few Puerto Rican performers playing Puerto Rican characters in the film, and they both worked with Natalie Wood on her accent as Maria. She attended some reunion events related to West Side Story. "She was a worldly, wiseass New Yorker, intelligent and very funny," recalled her friend and fellow dancer from West Side Story, actress Nobuko JoAnne Miyamoto.

Wilder was also known for roles in the vampire film, The Return of Count Yorga (1971), which she co-wrote; and in Silent Movie (1976), Bloodbrothers (1978), Why Not Stay for Breakfast? (1979), The Last Married Couple in America (1980), and Seems Like Old Times (1980).

Most of Wilder's work was in television, including roles in Hennesey (1962), CBS Workshop (1964), Hey, Landlord (1967), Bracken's World (1969), Room 222 (1969–1970), The Mary Tyler Moore Show (1972), The Courtship of Eddie's Father (1972), The Partridge Family (1971–1972), The Girl with Something Extra (1973), Death Sentence (1974), On the Rocks (1975–1976), The Practice (1976), Police Story (1977), Operation Petticoat (1977–1978), The Tenth Month (1979), One Day at a Time (1979), Archie Bunker's Place (1981–1982), Mama's Family (1983), Gimme a Break! (1986–1987), 227 (1988), The Equalizer (1986–1989), and Full House (1988–1991).

Wilder was also half of a comedy duo with Jack Colvin. Later in life, she was a painter and sculptor, and wrote a play, Weehawken, performed in Los Angeles in 1988.

== Filmography ==
=== Film ===
Yvonne Wilder film credits
Year	Title	Role
1961	West Side Story	Consuelo
1971	The Return of Count Yorga	Jennifer Nelson
1976	Silent Movie	Studio Chief's Secretary
1978	Bloodbrothers	Phyllis De Coco (uncredited)
1979	Why Not Stay for Breakfast?	Helen
1980	The Last Married Couple in America	Margrette
1980	Seems Like Old Times	Aurora De La Hoya

=== Television ===
Yvonne Wilder television credits
Year	Title	Role	Notes
1962	Hennesey	Waitress / Wave Corpsman Bertha Bartosik	2 episodes
1964	CBS Workshop		1 episode
1967	Hey, Landlord	Secretary	1 episode
1969	Bracken's World	Esta Goldman	1 episode
1969–1970	Room 222	Mrs. Guerroro / Mrs. Musgrove	2 episodes
1972	The Mary Tyler Moore Show	Barbara Gardner	1 episode
1972	The Courtship of Eddie's Father	Kathy	1 episode
1971–1972	The Partridge Family	Waitress / Sheila	4 episodes
1973	The Girl with Something Extra	Taffy	1 episode
1974	Death Sentence	Elaine Croft	TV movie
1975–1976	On the Rocks	Lillian	2 episodes
1976	The Practice	Mrs. Widdicomb	Episode: "The Snow Job" (S2.E5)
1977	Police Story	Angie	1 episode
1977–1978	Operation Petticoat	Major Edna Howard	23 episodes
1979	The Tenth Month	Mrs. Figueroa	TV movie
1979	One Day at a Time	Dr. Bradshaw	1 episode
1981–1982	Archie Bunker's Place	Katherine Logan	4 episodes
1983	Mama's Family	Scarlett May Dubois	1 episode
1986–1987	Gimme a Break!	(various)	5 episodes
1986–1989	The Equalizer	Lettie	3 episodes "Wash Up" (S1.E16) "Torn" (S1.E17) "The Sins of Our Fathers" (S4.E8)
1988	227	Anna Gonzales	1 episode
1988–1991	Full House	Irene Katsopolis	7 episodes

== Personal life ==
Wilder married five times. Her third husband was Bob Kelljan (Robert Kelluchian). Her fifth husband was Zach Kleiman. She had one son, Chris. She died at home in Los Angeles on November 24, 2021, at the age of 84.
