= Robert Quarry =

American actor (1925–2009)

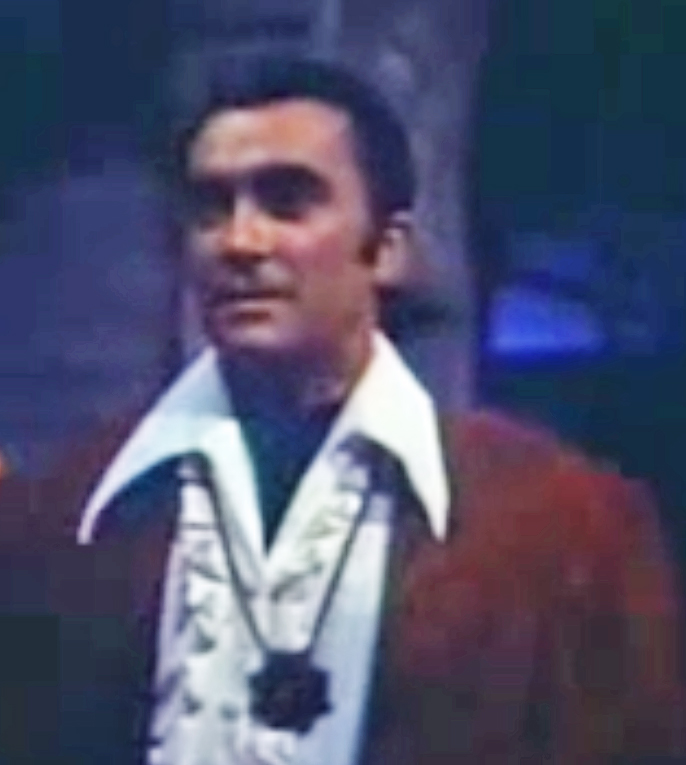
- Quarry in trailer for Count Yorga, Vampire (1970)
- Born: Robert Walter Quarry; November 3, 1925; Santa Rosa, California, U.S.
- Died: February 20, 2009 (aged 83); Woodland Hills, Los Angeles, California, U.S.
- Occupation: Actor
- Years active: 1943–1999

Robert Walter Quarry (November 3, 1925 – February 20, 2009) was an American actor, known for several prominent horror film roles.

== Life and career ==
Quarry was born in Fresno, California, the son of Mable (née Shoemaker) and Paul Quarry, a doctor. His grandmother was an actress. He left school at the age of 14 to pursue a career in radio.

During World War II in November 1943, Quarry joined the United States Army, where he formed a theatrical troupe. After the war he acted again, first for RKO and then for MGM.

Quarry made various guest appearances on TV shows, including two in 1965 on Perry Mason. He appeared on an episode of The Rockford Files. He played in two episodes of The Lone Ranger. Following over two decades of working in supporting roles in film and television, Quarry had an opportunity to play starring roles in horror films, starting with Count Yorga, Vampire (1970) and its sequel The Return of Count Yorga (1971). Quarry next worked with American International Pictures. Quarry co-starred with Vincent Price in AIP's Dr. Phibes Rises Again (1972), in which he played alchemist Dr. Biederbeck pitted against Price's Phibes in a race to find the mythical elixir of eternal life. The duo would later be paired in Madhouse (1974), the last film to feature Price at AIP.

AIP had plans for Quarry to succeed Price as their main horror star, signing him to a long-term contract. Quarry did make further horror film appearances for AIP, as the hippy guru vampire Khorda in 1973's The Deathmaster, and as a gangster in the 1974 blaxploitation-zombie movie Sugar Hill but a variety of factors affected his career at the studio: the departure of AIP co-founder James H. Nicholson and business manager Paul Zimmerman, the decline in the company's fortunes that forced cheaper productions, and the subsequent degradation of popularity in old-style horror films. Quarry later returned to supporting roles and appearances in TV series. Among other roles, he appeared in one episode of The Lost Saucer (1975) and played disfigured gunrunner Commander Corliss in the Buck Rogers in the 25th Century episode "Return of the Fighting 69th" (1979).

In 1980 he was in an automobile accident, in which he was struck by a drunk driver. It resulted in serious facial injuries. He was also mugged in Hollywood shortly thereafter.
In 1987, Quarry returned to film with Cyclone directed by Fred Olen Ray. Quarry would be cast in over 20 of Ray's films in the remainder of his career.

== Death ==
Quarry died on February 20, 2009, at the Motion Picture & Television Country House and Hospital in Woodland Hills, California, aged 83.

== Selected filmography ==
- Shadow of a Doubt (1943) – Santa Rosa Teenager (uncredited)
- Soldier of Fortune (1955) – Frank Stewart – U.S. Consulate (uncredited)
- House of Bamboo (1955) – Phil (uncredited)
- A Kiss Before Dying (1956) – Dwight Powell
- Crime of Passion (1957) – Reporter
- Official Detective (1957, TV Series) – Ed Platt
- Sea Hunt (1959, TV Series) – Bill Hill
- Agent for H.A.R.M. (1966) – Borg
- Winning (1969) – Sam Jagin (uncredited)
- Colossus: The Forbin Project (1970) – Scientist (uncredited)
- Count Yorga, Vampire (1970) – Count Yorga
- WUSA (1970) – Noonan
- The Return of Count Yorga (1971) – Count Yorga
- Dr. Phibes Rises Again (1972) – Darrus Biederbeck
- The Deathmaster (1973) – Khorda
- Sugar Hill (1974) – Morgan
- The Midnight Man (1974) – Dr. Prichette
- Madhouse (1974) – Oliver Quayle
- Rollercoaster (1977) – Mayor
- Cyclone (1987) – Knowles
- Commando Squad (1987) – Milo
- Moon in Scorpio (1987) – Dr. Khorda
- Warlords (1988) – Dr. Mathers
- L.A. Bounty (1989) – Jimmy
- Beverly Hills Vamp (1989) – Father Ferraro
- Sexbomb (1989) – King Faraday
- Alienator (1990) – Doc Burnside
- Haunting Fear (1990) – Visconti
- Mob Boss (1990) – Dr. Jones
- Spirits (1990) – Dr. Richard Wicks
- Evil Spirits (1990) – Doctor
- Teenage Exorcist (1991) – Father McFerrin
- Evil Toons (1992) – Demon (voice, uncredited)
- Angel Eyes (1993) – Murray
- Mind Twister (1993) – Bob
- Inner Sanctum II (1994) – Steve Warren
- Droid Gunner (1995) – Chew'Bah
- The Shooter (1997) – Examiner
- Jungle Boy (1998) – Bono (voice)
- Dear Santa (1998) – Mr. Ambrose
- Mom's Outta Sight (1998) – Robert Secord
- The Prophet (1998) – Agent Betts
