= I Am the Greatest: The Adventures of Muhammad Ali =

1977 American animated TV series

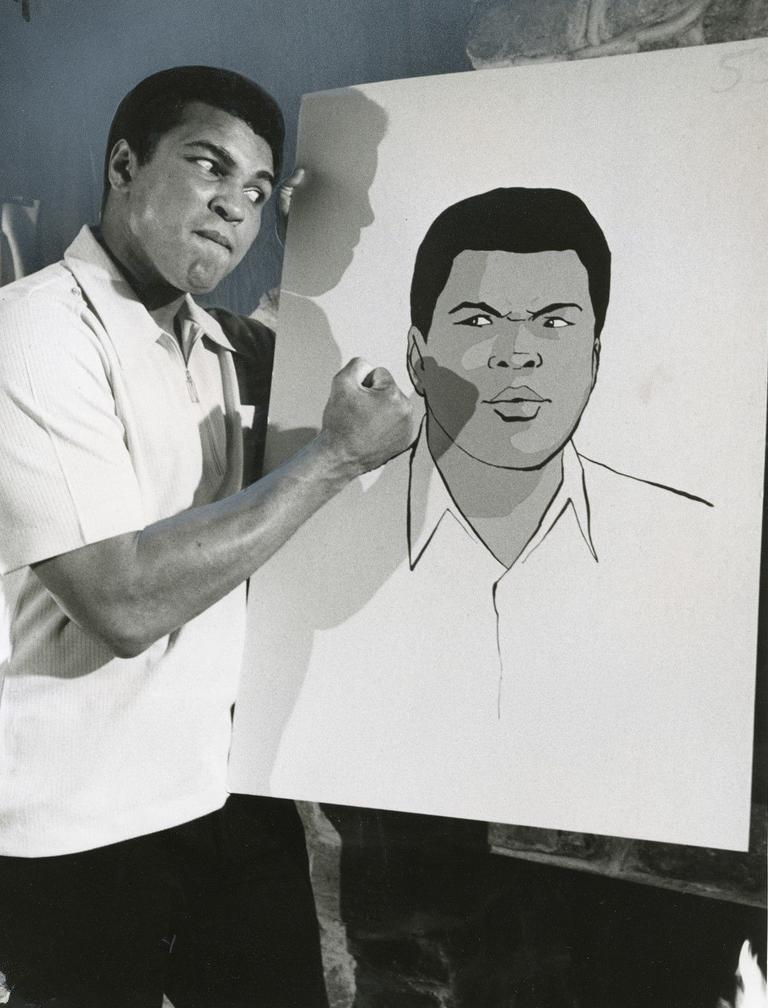
- Muhammad Ali promoting the show
- Genre: Animation
- Created by: Fred Calvert; Kimie Calvert; John Paxton
- Voices of: Muhammad Ali; Frank Bannister; Casey Carmichael; Patrice Carmichael
- Country of origin: United States
- Original language: English
- No. of seasons: 1
- No. of episodes: 13

Production
- Running time: 22 minutes
- Production company: Farmhouse Films

Original release
- Network: NBC
- Release: September 10 – December 3, 1977

I Am the Greatest: The Adventures of Muhammad Ali is an animated series featuring boxer Muhammad Ali, who performed his own voice. The series was broadcast Saturday mornings on NBC and produced by Fred Calvert's independent production company, Farmhouse Films, in the fall of 1977, but was cancelled after 13 episodes due to its low ratings.

In the show, Muhammad Ali and his public relations manager, Frank Bannister, both provided their own voices, as Ali went on adventures with his (fictional) niece Nicky and nephew Damon, voiced by Casey Carmichael and Patrice Carmichael.

== Crew ==
- Directed by Fred Calvert
- Written by John Bates, Carole Beers, Booker Bradshaw, Ellen and David Christianson, Joseph R. Henderson, Bryan Joseph, Gene Moss

== Cast ==
- Muhammad Ali as Himself
- Frank Bannister as Himself
- Casey Carmichael as Nicky
- Patrice Carmichael as Damon

== Episodes ==
No.	Title	Original release date
1	"The Great Alligator"	September 10, 1977
2	"The Air Fair Affair"	September 17, 1977
3	"The Littlest Runner"	September 24, 1977
4	"Ali's African Adventure"	October 1, 1977
5	"Superstar"	October 8, 1977
6	"The Haunted Park"	October 15, 1977
7	"Caught in the Wild"	October 22, 1977
8	"Volcano Island"	October 29, 1977
9	"Oasis of the Moon"	November 5, 1977
10	"The Great Bluegrass Mountain Race"	November 12, 1977
11	"The Werewolf of Devil's Creek"	November 19, 1977
12	"Sissy's Climb"	November 26, 1977
13	"Terror in the Deep"	December 3, 1977

== Reception ==
The series received generally negative reviews. In The Encyclopedia of American Animated Television Shows, David Perlmutter writes: "… perhaps the most clumsily animated, written, and acted series in television animation history, with little of value presented."
