= Bill Ewing =

American film producer

- Occupations: Actor, director, producer, screenwriter
- Years active: mid-1970s to present
- Spouse: Susan McIver

William R. Ewing is an American film director, producer, screenwriter and actor. Ewing is president of Every Tribe Entertainment and Bearing Fruit Entertainment.

== Career ==
Ewing began his career as an actor before joining Sony Pictures in 1986. He was named Director of Production Services in 1987. Ewing was promoted to Vice President in 1988 and later to Senior Vice President after Sony's acquisition of Columbia Pictures.

He supervised production of over 100 films, including A League of Their Own, My Girl, Groundhog Day, In the Line of Fire, Little Women, Air Force One, Men in Black, The Patriot, Charlie's Angels, etc. He served as Senior Vice President of Production and Administration for 15 years, with his final productions including Spider-Man, Adaptation, Stuart Little 2, and Men in Black II.

In 2001, he left Sony to found Every Tribe Entertainment and the non-profit Bearing Fruit Entertainment as Christian media groups.

== Personal life ==
Bill Ewing lives in Los Angeles with his wife Susan McIver. He is the father of singer and actor Blake McIver Ewing.

== Filmography ==
- Hollywood on Fire (2009) himself
- End of the Spear (2005) producer & writer
- Christmas Child (2003) director
- Beyond the Gates of Splendor (2002) producer
- Automan (1984) TV, actor
- WKRP in Cincinnati (1982) TV, actor
- Meteor (1979) cast coordinator
- A Man Called Sloane (1979) TV, actor
- Little House on the Prairie (1979) TV, actor
- The Odyssey (1979) TV, actor
- The End (1978) actor
- The Blue Knight (1976) TV, actor
- Korg: 70,000 B.C. (1974) TV, actor
- The Rookies (1973) TV, actor
- The Deathmaster (1972) actor
- The Hoax (1972) actor
- Cannon (1971) TV, actor

== Additional sources ==
- When Magazine, "Conversation with Bill Ewing, President of Every Tribe Entertainment"
- Phill Coke and The Change Revolution, interview with Bill Ewing
- Fluctu8.com, "Daniel Britt Interviews Bill Ewing"
- Emol.org, By Madelyn Ritrosky-Winslow, "Movie with a Message: Interview with Bill Ewing about "End of the Spear"
- Mediawise Family, by Ted Baehr, "Faith, Flexibility, and Focus – an interview with Bill Ewing"
- Barnes and Noble, The Christmas Child: A Story of Coming Home
- Impact Productions on development and filming of The Christmas Child
