= Johnny Allegro =

1949 film by Ted Tetzlaff

- Theatrical release poster
- Directed by: Ted Tetzlaff
- Screenplay by: Guy Endore; Karen DeWolf
- Story by: James Edward Grant
- Produced by: Irving Starr
- Starring: George Raft; Nina Foch; George Macready
- Cinematography: Joseph F. Biroc
- Edited by: Jerome Thoms
- Music by: George Duning
- Color process: Black and white
- Production company: Columbia Pictures
- Distributed by: Columbia Pictures
- Release date: May 26, 1949
- Running time: 81 minutes
- Country: United States
- Language: English

Johnny Allegro is a 1949 American film noir directed by Ted Tetzlaff and starring George Raft. An ex-gangster (Raft), temporarily working as a federal agent, runs afoul of a counterfeiting crime lord (Macready) who enjoys hunting. It was one of several thrillers Raft made in the late 1940s.

== Plot ==
Johnny Allegro (George Raft) escaped from prison in New York and is trying to rebuild his life working as a florist in a large hotel in Los Angeles. He meets Glenda Chapman (Nina Foch) when she asks for his help in avoiding police detectives who are following her. But Treasury agents ask Allegro to help them by working undercover for them to stop the plot that Glenda is involved in. Allegro has no choice but to cooperate because they know that he is an escaped prisoner. At the same time Glenda and Allegro are falling in love even though Glenda is married. Glenda takes Allegro with her to an island off the coast of Florida where Morgan Vallin (George MacReady), her husband, is the mastermind of a plot to bring down the American government by flooding the U.S. economy with counterfeit currency. Vallin is a sadistic criminal who enjoys toying with his victims. He doesn't trust Allegro nor even his wife. Allegro manages to contact the Treasury agents with a short wave radio on one of the boats at the wharf. Allegro finds out where the counterfeit bills are hidden on the island. The Treasury agents arrive after Allegro kills Vallin in a desperate fight. The agents tell Allegro that he can rest easy about returning to prison now that his cooperation has resulted in the end of the threat. As they all sit in the boat leaving the island, Allegro and Glenda hug.

== Cast ==
- George Raft as Johnny Allegro
- Nina Foch as Glenda Chapman
- George Macready as Morgan Vallin
- Will Geer as Schultzy
- Gloria Henry as Addie
- Ivan Triesault as Pelham Vetch
- Harry Antrim as Pudgy
- William 'Bill' Phillips as Roy

== Production ==
The film was originally known as The Big Jump. Then it was known as Hounded.

George Raft signed on to make the film in July 1948. It was his first movie at Columbia since She Couldn't Take It (1935). Jane Greer was sought for the female lead. However Nina Foch, who had just enjoyed a big stage success with John and Mary, took the role.

Filming started in December 1948. Filming went for longer than intended, meaning Raft missed out on starring in The Big Steal and the role went to Robert Mitchum, with leading lady Jane Greer. Some scenes were shot at Catalina Island, which was renamed 'Palm Island' for the film.

== Reception ==
The Los Angeles Times thought the film had "polish and novelty as a melodrama" but was still essentially a B picture. "Raft does well enough in a routine way although there is not too much illumination in this performance."

The New York Times said "nothing of any slight distinction" except a scene where someone is killed with a bow and arrow "has been written into this low-grade fiction... Nothing with any vague resemblance to vivid acting is contributed by Mr. Raft, who has become one of the most indifferent and comatose actors extant."
