= Unholy Rollers =

1972 film by Vernon Zimmerman

The Unholy Rollers
- US film poster
- Directed by: Vernon Zimmerman
- Screenplay by: Howard R. Cohen
- Story by: Vernon Zimmerman; Howard R. Cohen
- Produced by: John Prizer; Jack Bohrer
- Starring: Claudia Jennings; Louis Quinn; Betty Anne Rees; Roberta Collins
- Cinematography: Michael Shea
- Edited by: Martin Scorsese; George Trirogoff; Yeu-Bun Yee
- Music by: Bobby Hart
- Production company: Roger Corman Productions
- Distributed by: American International Pictures
- Release date: November 10, 1972
- Running time: 88 minutes
- Country: United States
- Language: English

The Unholy Rollers is a 1972 American action comedy film directed by Vernon Zimmerman and starring Claudia Jennings.

The film focuses on a team of roller derby skaters whose members are hostile to each other.

== Plot ==
Karen Walker wants more action out of life and quits her job at the cannery to become a skater in the roller derby. She encounters friction from the other skaters—especially Mickey, the current star of the team. Karen proves herself a feisty competitor but refuses to be a team player. As she skates her way to stardom, she incurs the wrath of jealous team members and Stern, the owner of the team.

== Cast ==
- Claudia Jennings as Karen Walker
- Louis Quinn as Mr. Stern
- Betty Anne Rees as Mickey
- Roberta Collins as Jennifer
- Alan Vint as Greg
- Victor Argo as Vinnie the Trainer
- Candice Roman as Donna
- Jay Varela as Nick
- Charlene Jones as Beverly Brayton
- Joe E. Tata as Marshall
- Terry Wolf as grocery boy

== Production ==
The film was made to cash in on publicity from MGM's roller derby film, Kansas City Bomber. Roger Corman agreed to produce the film for AIP, even though he had established his own studio, New World Pictures. This was one of the last times Corman collaborated with AIP.

There were several other competing roller derby films announced in early 1972. They included Jam produced by Al Ruddy starring Mama Cass and George Hamilton and directed by Steve Ihnat, and Wipeout with Lois Nettleton and Ina Balin. The Corman project was known as Leader of the Pack. However Jam and Wipeout where never made.

The movie was the first screenplay credit for Howard R. Cohen who went on to have a long association with Corman.

== Reception ==
Due to delays in editing, Kansas City Bomber was released first to cinemas before Unholy Rollers. Martin Scorsese, who had directed Boxcar Bertha for Roger Corman and AIP, was called in to supervise editing. He said the delay in releasing the film caused it to be "destroyed" commercially.

The Pittsburgh Post-Gazette called it "a poverty row version of Kansas City Bomber."

Take One magazine said Claudia Jennings "carries the film. Her characterization of a woman so angry that she becomes, in some strange way, an all-avenging Kali figure, is fascinating."
