= Jacques Aubuchon =

American actor (1924–1991)

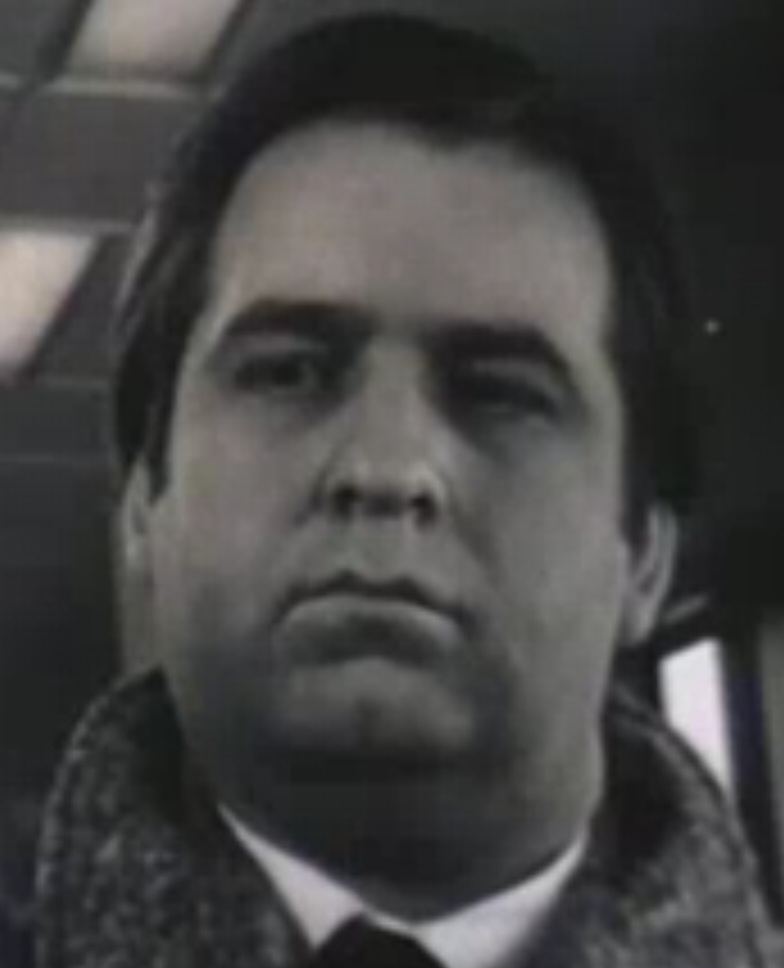
- Aubuchon in an episode of Man Against Crime (1953)
- Born: Jacques Georges Aubuchon; October 30, 1924
- Died: December 28, 1991 (aged 67); Woodland Hills, California, U.S.
- Resting place: Saint Joseph Cemetery, Massachusetts
- Occupation: Actor
- Years active: 1953–1989
- Children: Remi Aubuchon

Jacques Georges Aubuchon (October 30, 1924 – December 28, 1991) was an American actor who appeared in films, stage, and on television in the 1950s through the 1980s.

== Early life ==
Aubuchon, who grew up in Fitchburg, Massachusetts, was the son of Arthur and Flora Aubuchon. He went to Assumption Preparatory School and served in the US Army during World War II. During his working career, Aubuchon made over 300 television appearances, made two dozen films, did hundreds of television commercials, plus wrote plays.

== Career ==
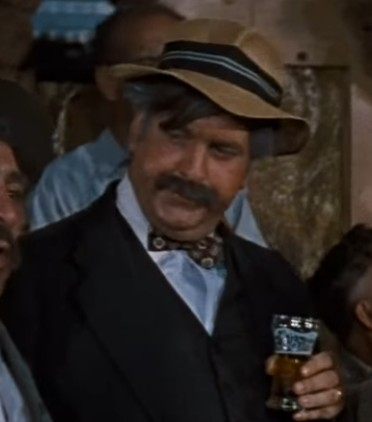
Aubuchon in Beneath the 12-Mile Reef (1953)

One of Aubuchon's best known roles was as Chief Urulu on McHale's Navy. Aubuchon's first part on Broadway was as the sewerman in The Madwoman of Chaillot and Paris 7000 was the first television show that he had a regular part on.

== Death ==
Aubuchon, who was the father of television writer and producer Remi Aubuchon and father-in-law of Dirk Blocker, died of heart failure at the age of 67. He was buried in Saint Joseph Cemetery, Fitchburg, Worcester County, Massachusetts.

== Partial TV and filmography ==
- So Big (1953) - August Hempel
- Mister Peepers (1953)
- Beneath the 12-Mile Reef (1953) - Demetrios Sofotes
- Operation Manhunt (1954) - Volov
- The Silver Chalice (1954) - Nero
- The Scarlet Hour (1956) - Fat Boy
- Gunsmoke (1956–1975, TV Series) - Linder Hogue / Bert Clum / Torp / Short
- The Big Boodle (1957) - Miguel Collada
- The Way to the Gold (1957) - Clem Williams
- Gun Glory (1957) - Sam Winscott
- The Restless Gun (1958) Episode "Strange Family in Town"
- Short Cut to Hell (1957) - Bahrwell
- Thunder Road (1958) - Carl Kogan
- Bat Masterson (1959) - King Louie
- The Shaggy Dog (1959) - Stefano
- Have Gun Will Travel (1959–1961, TV Series) - Moriarity - Town Bully / Billy Banjo Jones / Judge Wesson
- Perry Mason (1959–1964, TV Series) - Roger Brody / Victor Bundy / George Gage / Felix Karr
- Rawhide (1960) in 2nd-season episode "Incident at Spanish Rock" - Juan Carroyo
- Wanted Dead or Alive (1960 TV Series) - Peter Kovack
- Twenty Plus Two (1961) - Jacques Pleschette
- McHale's Navy (1962–1964, TV Series) - Chief Pali Urulu
- The Twilight Zone (1963, TV Series) - Connolly
- Wild and Wonderful (1964) - Papa Ponchon - Giselle's Father
- The Man from U.N.C.L.E. (1964, TV Series) - Emil
- Combat! (1965) in 4th-season episode "Evasion" - Kopke
- McHale's Navy Joins the Air Force (1965) - Dimitri
- The Monkees (1966, TV Series) - Boris
- Hogan's Heroes (1966, TV Series) - General von Kattenhorn
- F Troop (1966, TV Series) - Gideon D. Jeffries
- Johnny Belinda (1967, TV Movie) - Pacquet
- Garrison's Gorillas (1967, TV Series) - Ettienne
- Bewitched (1967, TV Series) - Phineas
- Tarzan (1968–1969, TV Series) - Captain / Joppo
- Judd for the Defense (1969, TV Series) - John Morgan
- Land of the Giants (1969, TV Series) - Zurpin
- The Love God? (1969) - Carter Fenton
- Black Water Gold (1970, TV Movie) - Kefalos
- Paris 7000 (1970, TV Series) - Lt. Maurois / Police Lieutenant
- The Hoax (1972) - Chief Belkins
- McCloud (1972, TV Series) - Inspector Lelouch
- Columbo (1974, TV Series) - Jeffrey Neal
- Apple's Way (1974, TV Series) - Stavros
- Marcus Welby, M.D. (1974, TV Series) - Dr. Crayler
- Hawaii Five-O (1974, TV Series) - Charles Portman
- The Waltons (1974, TV Series) - Victor Povich
- Barbary Coast (1975, TV Series) - Mr. Roszack
- Jigsaw John (1976, TV Series) - Charles Bouchard
- Switch (1976–1978, TV Series) - Arthur Cummings / Adam Hayward / Earl Harper
- Project U.F.O. (1978, TV Series) - Marchand
- Starsky and Hutch (1978, TV Series) - Davidowsky
- Hart to Hart (1980, TV Series) - Maurice Simone
- Remington Steele (1984, TV Series) - Professor Arthur Thickett
- Highway to Heaven (1984, TV Series) - Clinton Rudd
