= Roger Perry =

American actor (1933–2018)

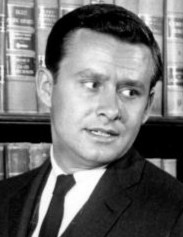
- Roger Perry in TV's Harrigan and Son (1960)
- Born: May 7, 1933; Davenport, Iowa, U.S.
- Died: July 12, 2018 (aged 85); Indian Wells, California, U.S.
- Occupations: Actor; intelligence officer
- Years active: 1958–2011
- Known for: Tomorrow Is Yesterday; The Facts of Life; Harrigan and Son; Arrest and Trial
- Spouses: Patricia Perry (div. 1965) Jo Anne Worley (m. 1975; div. 2000); Joyce Bulifant (m. 2002)
- Children: 2
- Awards: Palm Springs Walk of Stars

Roger Perry (May 7, 1933 – July 12, 2018) was an American film and television actor whose career began in the late 1950s. He served as an intelligence officer in the United States Air Force during the early 1950s.

== Career ==
=== Television ===
In the 1960–1961 television season, Perry portrayed attorney Jim Harrigan Jr. in Harrigan and Son, with Pat O'Brien as his father. He guest-starred on numerous American television series from the 1950s through the 1980s. His first television appearance was as Ted Jarvis in the 1958 episode "Paper Bullets" of the syndicated crime drama, U.S. Marshal. In 1960, he appeared with James Coburn and John Dehner in the episode "Friend of the Family" of The Texan, and the premiere episode, "You're Only Young Twice," of New Comedy Showcase. He co-starred in the 1963–1964 series Arrest and Trial as Detective Sergeant Dan Kirby. He played the scriptwriter Cliff opposite Sharon Farrell and Franchot Tone on The Alfred Hitchcock Hour Season 3 Episode 14 "Final Performance" which aired on 1/17/1965.

In NBC's Star Trek episode "Tomorrow Is Yesterday" (1967) he guested as a 20th-century U.S. Air Force pilot. Other television series in which he appeared include Combat!, Dr. Kildare, The Six Million Dollar Man, Wonder Woman, The Bob Newhart Show, Emergency!, Love, American Style, The Andy Griffith Show, The Invaders, Ironside, The F.B.I., The Eleventh Hour, The Munsters, Barnaby Jones, Adam-12, Falcon Crest, and a recurring role as headmaster Charles Parker on The Facts of Life.

=== Films ===
Perry starred in two American International Pictures horror films featuring the vampire character Count Yorga. In Count Yorga, Vampire (1970), Perry portrayed Dr. James Hayes, the protagonist who uncovers the true nature of Yorga (but is attacked and killed by Yorga's brides). However, Perry returned as a different lead character in the sequel, The Return of Count Yorga (1971), as Professor David Baldwin. He also starred alongside Ray Milland and Rosey Grier as Dr. Philip Desmond in the cult classic The Thing with Two Heads.

== Personal life and death ==
Perry's first wife was Patricia Perry. They had two children, Christopher Perry and Dana Perry McNerney. They divorced in 1965. Perry married actress/comedian Jo Anne Worley on May 11, 1975. They divorced in 2000 and had no children. He later married actress Joyce Bulifant, and in 2014, Perry and Bulifant were honored with a Golden Palm Star on the Walk of Stars in Palm Springs, California. Perry had one biological grandchild, Parker McNerney, by his daughter, Dana.

Perry died from prostate cancer at age 85 at his home in Indian Wells, California, on July 12, 2018.

== Filmography ==
=== Film ===
Year	Title	Role	Notes
1959	The Flying Fontaines	Paul Fontaine	
1963	Follow the Boys	Radarman Billy Pulaski	
1966	The Cat	Pete Kilby	
1967	You've Got to Be Smart	Jerry Harper	
1969	Heaven with a Gun	Ned Hunter	
1970	Count Yorga, Vampire	Dr. James 'Jim' Hayes	
1971	The Return of Count Yorga	Dr. David Baldwin	
1972	The Thing with Two Heads	Dr. Philip Desmond	
1979	Roller Boogie	Roger Barkley	
1988	Operation Warzone	American Soldier	
2005	Dirty Love	Joe	
2010	Wreckage	Sheriff Macabee	

=== Television ===
Year	Title	Role	Notes
1959	Westinghouse Desilu Playhouse	Danny Cash	Episode: "Ballad for a Bad Man"
1959	December Bride	Mayfair	Episode: "Lily's Advice Column"
1959	December Bride		Episode: "The Martian Show"
1959	Whirlybirds	Bob Waters	Episode: "Bankrupt Alibi"
1960	The Texan	Robin Randolph	Episode: "Friend of the Family"
1960	New Comedy Showcase	Arthur	Episode: "You're Only Young Twice"
1960	U.S. Marshal	Ted Jarvis	Episode: "Paper Bullets"
1960–1961	Harrigan and Son	James Harrigan Jr.	34 episodes
1962	Dr. Kildare	Dr. Art Bedlow	Episode: "The Stepping Stone"
1962	General Electric Theater	Ben Duncan	Episode: "The First Hundred Years"
1962	The Eleventh Hour	Dr. Edward Alden	Episode: "Ann Costigan: A Duel on a Field of White"
1963	Alcoa Premiere	Sergeant Clinton Martin	Episode: "The Hat of Sergeant Martin"
1963	Sam Benedict	Leonard Pittman	Episode: "Accomplice"
1963–1964	Arrest and Trial	Detective Sergeant Dan Kirby	29 episodes
1964	Bob Hope Presents the Chrysler Theatre	Don Corbin	Episode: "Think Pretty"
1964	Kraft Suspense Theatre	Captain Gordon Robbins	Episode: "The Kamchatka Incident"
1965	Broadside	Lieutenant Alex Cassidy	Episode: "Behind the Eight Ball"
1965	The Alfred Hitchcock Hour	Cliff Allen	Episode: "Final Performance"
1965	Broadside	Lieutenant Mark Clay	Episode: "Anne Morgan's Home Movies"
1965	The Munsters	Ted Bradley	Episode: "A Man for Marilyn"
1966	12 O'Clock High	Captain Vic Enright	Episode: "Cross-Hairs on Death"
1967	The Andy Griffith Show	George Jones	Episode: "Don't Miss a Good Bet"
1967	Star Trek: The Original Series	Major Christopher	Episode: "Tomorrow Is Yesterday"
1967	Combat!	Carl Driskoll	Episode: "The Masquers"
1967	Hondo	Johnny Reno	Episode: "Hondo and the Judas"
1967	The Invaders	Bill Shay	Episode: "The Prophet"
1967	Garrison's Gorillas	Jason	Episode: "Black Market"
1968	The Felony Squad	Eddie Crisp	Episode: "Nightmare on a Dead-End Street"
1968	Judd, for the Defense	Henry Hazlitt	Episode: "You Remember Joe Maddox"
1968	Premiere	Jerry Taylor	Episode: "Crisis"
1969	The Outsider	Briggs	Episode: "Take the Key and Lock Him Up"
1969	Lancer	Ben Cameron	Episode: "The Measure of a Man"
1969	Adam-12	Richard Combest	Episode: "Log 123: Courtroom"
1970	Paris 7000		Episode: "The Shattered Idol"
1970	Dan August	Hal Porter	Episode "Murder by Proxy"
1970	The Bold Ones: The New Doctors	Jim Carmichael	Episode: "Giants Never Kneel"
1970	Insight	Lindsey	Episode: "The Day God Died"
1971	Alias Smith and Jones	R.M. Foster	Episode: "Something to Get Hung About"
1971	Revenge!	Pete Marsh	ABC Movie of the Week
1972	Gidget Gets Married	Tom Blaine	ABC Movie of the Week
1972	Emergency!	Russ Gentry	Episode: "Kids"
1973	Room 222	Jim Reis	Episode: "Love Is a Many Splintered Thing"
1973	Tenafly	Heller	Episode: "The Window That Wasn't"
1973	What Are Best Friends For?	Keith	TV movie
1974	Emergency!	Gene Porter	Episode: "The Screenwriter"
1974	The Six Million Dollar Man	Charles Colby	Episode: "The Peeping Blonde"
1976	The Bionic Woman	Mr. Stone	Episode: "A Thing of the Past"
1977	Hawaii Five-O	Morrison	Episode: "Ready, Aim....."
1977	The Six Million Dollar Man	Dr. George Berman	Episode: "The Privacy of the Mind"
1977	The Man with the Power	Farnsworth (uncredited)	TV movie
1978	The Bionic Woman	Dr. Thomas Tharp	Episode: "All for One"
1978	Police Woman	Ray	Episode: "Good Old Uncle Ben"
1979	Wonder Woman	Dunfield	Episode: "The Richest Man in the World"
1979	Quincy, M.E.	Agent Richard Haber	Episode: "The Money Plague"
1980	CHiPs	Howard	Episode: "Tow Truck Lady"
1974–1980	Barnaby Jones		6 episodes
1981	B.J. and the Bear	Kenton	Episode: "Intercepted Pass"
1981–1983	The Facts of Life	Charles Parker	10 episodes
1984	The Fall Guy	Jarvis	Episode: "Bite of the Wasp"
1982–1985	Falcon Crest	John Costello	12 episodes
