= Kofy Brown =

American singer-songwriter

Kenya Sims (born 1969 or 1970), known by her stage name Kofy Brown, is an American singer-songwriter.

== Musical career ==
In 1994, Kofy released her debut album, Live & Delicious, as an 11-track live set on Simba Music, a record label created after her attempts to sign with a major label were unsuccessful. She promoted it using college radio and mix shows. It was followed in 1997 by Hungry, which was described as more "funk".

In 1999, she released Skinny & Tight, promoting it by doing tours across the Western United States and Canada. It was called "raw, tight, and funky" by Bass Player. In 2001, Brown released Area 32. It peaked at No. 15 on the Top Reggae Albums chart during May 2003. It was followed by Love Warrior in 2004 and two live albums, in 2006 and 2008 respectively.

She is currently a member of the bands SisterSpace and Skip the Needle.

== Personal life ==
Brown was born in Washington, D.C., moving to the San Francisco Bay Area around 1992. She is lesbian and is married to Margaret Belton. Her stage name is a nod to 1970s blaxploitation, specifically the movie Coffy, where Pam Grier played a woman called Coffy Brown. As of 2023, she lives in Oakland.

== Discography ==
- Live & Delicious (1994)
- Hungry (1997)
- Skinny & Tight (1999)
- Area 32 (2003)
- Love Warrior (2004)
