= Sugar Hill (1974 film) =

1974 film by Paul Maslansky

- Theatrical release poster
- Directed by: Paul Maslansky
- Written by: Tim Kelly
- Produced by: Elliot Schick
- Starring: Marki Bey; Robert Quarry; Don Pedro Colley; Betty Anne Rees; Richard Lawson; Zara Cully
- Cinematography: Robert Jessup
- Edited by: Carl Kress
- Music by: Nick Zesses; Dino Fekaris
- Production companies: American International Pictures; Samuel Z. Arkoff Presents
- Distributed by: American International Pictures
- Release date: February 6, 1974
- Running time: 91 minutes
- Country: United States
- Language: English
- Budget: $350,000

Sugar Hill is a 1974 American blaxploitation horror film, directed by Paul Maslansky and starring Marki Bey as the title character who uses voodoo to get revenge on the people responsible for her boyfriend's death. It was released by American International Pictures. According to the film, the zombies are the preserved bodies of slaves brought to the United States from Guinea. AIP had previously combined the horror and blaxploitation genres with Blacula (1972) and its sequel Scream Blacula Scream (1973).

== Plot ==
The story centers on Diana "Sugar" Hill (Bey), a photographer in Houston whose boyfriend, nightclub owner Langston (Larry D. Johnson), has been killed by mob boss Morgan (Robert Quarry) and his men when he refused to sell the club to Morgan. Sugar seeks the help of a former voodoo queen named Mama Maitresse (Zara Cully) to take revenge on Morgan and his thugs. Mama summons the voodoo lord of the dead, Baron Samedi (Don Pedro Colley), who enlists his army of zombies to destroy the men who killed Langston and now want the club. Investigating the killings is Sugar's former boyfriend, police Lt. Valentine (Richard Lawson).

== Cast ==
- Marki Bey as Diana "Sugar" Hill
- Robert Quarry as Morgan
- Don Pedro Colley as Baron Samedi
- Betty Anne Rees as Celeste
- Richard Lawson as Lt. Valentine
- Zara Cully as "Mama" Maitresse
- Charles P. Robinson as "Fabulous"
- Larry D. Johnson as Langston
- Rick Hagood as "Tank" Watson
- Ed Geldart as O'Brien
- Albert J. Baker as George
- Raymond E. Simpson, III as King
- Thomas C. Carroll as Baker
- Big Walter Price as Preacher
- Charles Krohn as Captain Merrill
- J. Randall Bell as Dr. Parkhurst
- Peter Harrell, III as Police Photographer
- Judy Hanson as The Masseuse
- Gary W. Chason as Lab Technician
- Roy L. Downey as Stevedore
- Garrett Scales as Crew Chief
- John E. Scarborough as Uniformed Cop

== Production ==
The film, budgeted at $350,000, was shot on location in Houston at such locations as the Heights branch of the Houston Public Library (a historical landmark), used in the film as a "Voodoo Institute". Sugar Hill was the last film Quarry did for AIP, after a run that included the Count Yorga films. Also appearing in the film was Cully, who played Mother Jefferson on the TV show The Jeffersons. Charles P. Robinson, known for his role as Mac Robinson on NBC's Night Court, portrayed the character of Fabulous. Hank Edds created the makeup effects for the zombies in the film.

== Release ==
The film was released theatrically in the United States by American International Pictures in February 1974. It was cut to 83 minutes for television and retitled The Zombies of Sugar Hill.

== Legacy ==
The film was broadcast on Tele 5 as part of the programme format SchleFaZ in season 2. The film was released on VHS by Orion Home Video in 1996, and on DVD in October 2011 as part of MGM's Limited Edition series.

On the review aggregator website Rotten Tomatoes, 67% of 9 critics' reviews are positive, with an average rating of 5.2/10. Writing in The Zombie Movie Encyclopedia, academic Peter Dendle called it "a humorously dated blaxploitation feature" whose zombies "represent a throwback to the classic zombie conceptualization of the '30s and '40s". Adam Tyner of DVD Talk rated it 4 out of 5 stars and wrote, "Creepy, sexy, sleazy, and a borderline-surreal amount of fun, Sugar Hill is a perfect movie for a Halloween marathon and probably my single favorite blaxploitation flick, period". The "unique blend of exploitation film and Southern gothic horror" in Sugar Hill was described by Bloody Disgusting in 2020 as an "underseen outlier" in zombie films following in the wake of George A. Romero's Night of the Living Dead (1968).

Rapper MF Doom sampled several audio clips from the film under his alias King Geedorah on the album Take Me to Your Leader (2003). A poster for the film appeared on a primary character's bedroom wall during a pivotal scene in 'Salem's Lot (2024) to establish the film's 1970s period setting.
