= Christmas Child =

- Promotional poster
- Directed by: William Ewing
- Written by: Andrea Jobe; Eric Newman
- Starring: Steven Curtis Chapman; William R. Moses; Megan Follows; Vicki Taylor Ross; Dennis Letts; Grant James
- Release date: November 9, 2004
- Running time: 96 minutes
- Country: United States
- Language: English

Christmas Child is a 2004 American Christian film directed by William Ewing starring Steven Curtis Chapman. The film is based on "The Christmas Cross," a short story by Max Lucado repackaged in 2003 as The Christmas Child: A Story of Coming Home, and is a story about a Chicago journalist who finds himself in Clearwater, Texas around Christmas time to discover his past.

== Plot ==
Nine months after the death of his adoptive father, Jack Davenport, a Chicago journalist, obtains some of his possessions which lead Jack to discover his past. Jack receives an assignment to do a story in Dallas, Texas. Jack leaves days before Christmas Eve and decides to stay in Clearwater, Texas, his birthplace. One of the possessions left by his adoptive father was a mysterious photograph of Clearwater's oldest churches, taken in 1963. The church has a life-sized, wood carven nativity scene, that was carved by Joe Ottolman during the 1950s. He meets several townspeople along his search, such as Michael Curtis (the reverend of the church who has adopted a little girl from China, much like Steven Curtis Chapman did in real life); Naomi Williams, a Clearwater newspaper writer; Vanessa, a County Courthouse employee; Jimmy James, Clearwater's sheriff; the judge; and a maintenance worker at the church. Jack is told by the judge that releasing the identity of an adoptee's parents can cause suffering, as he points out that one adopted girl died three years earlier. Jack goes on to research the story of Joe Ottolman, who was in a car accident in 1945 that killed his wife, but his daughter survived. Joe worked for ten years on the Nativity carving. In 1963, Joe made the same mistake and was in a car accident again. His daughter Carmen Ana Ottolman, gave birth to a boy on December 24, 1963, but Carmen died two days later. Joe set his grandson up for adoption, then he disappeared from the presses and no one knew whether or not he was alive. Naomi, who helped Jack gather information from previous newspapers, tried to get Jack's birth records with the help of her friend, Vanessa, who works there, but they are gone. When Jack finds this out, he discovers that the judge was trying to hide them from him. The judge then reveals that Carmen Ottolman was his mother. On his 40th birthday, Jack is still in shock of hearing this. He sleeps on the bench near the church, in front of the nativity scene. When the maintenance worker discovers him there, he brings him inside the church for some coffee. The maintenance worker then reveals himself to be Joe Ottolman, Jack's grandfather. That night, Jack's wife Megan arrives in Texas, and Jack tells her everything that happened. Megan reveals that they are going to be parents. On Christmas Night, the townspeople of Clearwater gather around the nativity scene while the reverend talks about it. After this, Jack tells his grandfather that he is going to be a great-grandfather.

== Cast ==
- William R. Moses as Jack Davenport
- Steven Curtis Chapman as Reverend Michael Curtis
- Tonya Bordeaux as Alicia
- Juli Erickson as Mrs. Schneider
- Megan Follows as Megan Davenport
- Grant James as Joe Ottolman
- Rebecca McCauley as Vanessa
- Vicki Taylor Ross as Naomi Williams
- Muse Watson as Sheriff Jimmy James
- Mary Donnelly-Haskell as Cindy
- Dennis Letts as the town's judge
- Deniece Williams as the singer
- Kitty Wells, known as "The Queen of Country Music, sings a few of the songs throughout the movie.
- Tom Lester, of Green Acres fame, as the voice of the KCOW radio DJ
