= Jerry Ayres =

American film and television actor

- Born: Gerald Holt Ayres Jr. September 21, 1936; California, U.S.
- Died: May 14, 2013 (aged 76); Valley Village, California, U.S.
- Occupations: Film and television actor

Gerald Holt Ayres Jr. (September 21, 1936 – May 14, 2013) was an American film and television actor. He was best known for playing private investigator Conway Weston in the American soap opera television series The Bold and the Beautiful.

== Life and career ==
Ayres was born in California. He began his screen career in 1965, appearing in the ABC military drama television series 12 O'Clock High. In the same year, he appeared in the NBC medical drama television series Dr. Kildare.

Later in his career, Ayres guest-starred in television programs Barnaby Jones, Star Trek: The Original Series, Hogan's Heroes, Charlie's Angels, Cannon, Trapper John, M.D. and The Rockford Files, and played the recurring role of Tom in the ABC soap opera television series Dynasty. He also played David Hamilton in the ABC soap opera television series General Hospital. He also appeared in films such as Ace Eli and Rodger of the Skies, Mame and Hangup.

Ayres last appeared in the CBS soap opera television series The Bold and the Beautiful, playing private investigator Conway Weston from 1987 to 1988 and again from 1990 to 1991.

== Death ==
Ayres died on May 14, 2013, of natural causes at his home in Valley Village, California, at the age of 76.
