= Count Yorga, Vampire =

1970 film

- Theatrical release poster
- Directed by: Bob Kelljan
- Written by: Bob Kelljan
- Produced by: Michael Macready
- Starring: Robert Quarry; Roger Perry; Michael Murphy; Michael Macready; Donna Anders
- Cinematography: Arch Archambault
- Edited by: Tony de Zarraga
- Music by: Bill Marx
- Production company: Erica Productions Inc.
- Distributed by: American International Pictures
- Release date: June 10, 1970
- Running time: 93 minutes
- Country: United States
- Language: English
- Budget: $100,000
- Box office: $1.3 million

Count Yorga, Vampire (also known as The Loves of Count Iorga, Vampire) is a 1970 American vampire horror film written and directed by Bob Kelljan and starring Robert Quarry, Roger Perry and Michael Murphy. It was followed by a sequel, The Return of Count Yorga.

== Plot ==
Los Angeles woman Donna hosts a séance. Overseeing the séance is Count Yorga, a Bulgarian mystic and hypnotist who has recently moved to the states from Europe. Yorga dated Donna's mother weeks before her death and insisted that she be buried rather than cremated per her wishes. Donna cannot recall seeing him at the funeral.

After the party is over, Donna's friends Erica and Paul drive Yorga home. Their van later gets stuck in the mud, although Paul insists that the road was dry a minute before. They resign themselves to spending the night in their van. Yorga, revealed to be a vampire, knocks out Paul and bites Erica. The following day, the couple reaches Los Angeles, unable to recall what happened.

Their doctor friend, Jim Hayes, inspects the wounds on Erica, who has lost blood. Later, Paul and Donna's boyfriend Michael try to call Erica's phone, to no avail. At her home, they find everything in disarray, with a hysterical Erica eating her kitten. She first threatens with violence and then attempts to seduce Paul before coming to her senses and breaking down.

They restrain her and call Hayes, who begins an emergency transfusion. Afraid, Erica begs Paul to forgive her and to kill her.

At his basement, which has been converted into a throne room, Yorga awakens his two vampiric brides, one of whom is Donna's mother, and commands them to have sex. That night, Yorga visits Erica. Promising her immortality, he seduces Erica, drains her of her blood, and takes her body to his manor. Upon finding Erica missing, Paul enters Yorga's mansion to rescue her. Yorga chokes him to death and has his servant Brudah break his back.

Michael alerts Hayes that Paul has gone to the mansion. Hayes' girlfriend suggests involving the police, citing a similar case of a baby being found in the woods, drained of its blood. Hayes calls the police but is rejected as a prankster following a recent rash of such calls. Hayes, Michael, and Donna visit the mansion to inquire about Paul's whereabouts and keep Yorga active until sunrise. While Hayes distracts Yorga, Brudah rebuffs Michael's attempts to explore the mansion. Yorga eventually becomes insistent that his guests must leave.

After leaving, Hayes and Michael plan to kill Yorga in the daytime. Michael and Donna rest while Hayes studies vampire lore until he, too, falls asleep.

Yorga awakens Donna telepathically and has her sabotage Michael's alarm clock before having her come to the mansion. There, Brudah rapes her. Michael awakens and finds Donna gone. It is nearly evening when he calls to awaken Hayes. Despite knowing how dangerous their chances are, they grab stakes and makeshift crosses before heading to the mansion as night falls. The two split up, and Yorga confronts Hayes. He leads Hayes into his basement where Hayes finds Erica's corpse among the dormant brides. He then attacks Yorga with a cross and stake, while yelling out for Michael. Yorga silently commands his brides to awake and attack Hayes.

As Yorga reunites Donna with her mother, Michael finds Paul's mutilated body. Brudah attacks Michael, who mortally stabs him. In the basement, Michael finds Hayes. Before dying of his wounds, Hayes reveals where Donna is. The now-vampirized Erica and another bride attack Michael. As he fends them off, Erica pauses, giving him a chance to stake her. However, Michael cannot bring himself to kill her and leaves.

Michael confronts Yorga and Donna's mother. Yorga pushes her into Michael's stake and flees. Michael goes after Yorga and eventually kills him with a stake. Donna mourns her mother a second time before Michael collects her.

While starting to leave, they are confronted by Erica and the remaining bride. They chase Michael and Donna until repelled by Michael's cross. Michael forces the vampires into a cellar, locking them in, but drops his cross. Believing the danger is over, he turns to Donna. But she lunges at Michael, fully transformed into a vampire and kills him.

== Cast ==
- Robert Quarry as Count Yorga
- Roger Perry as Dr. James "Jim" Hayes
- Michael Murphy as Paul
- Michael Macready as Michael "Mike" Thompson
- Donna Anderson as Donna (credited as Donna Anders)
- Judy Lang as Erica Landers (credited as Judith Lang)
- Edward Walsh as Brudah
- Julie Conners as Cleo
- Paul Hansen as Peter
- Sybil Scotford as Judy
- Marsha Jordan as Donna's Mother
- Deborah Darnell as Vampire Woman
- George Macready as Narrator

== Production ==
The film opens with a narration by character actor George Macready, whose son, Michael Macready, produced the film and also played "Michael".

The film was originally to have been a soft core porn film called The Loves of Count Iorga, and some prints of the film display this as the on-screen title. Quarry told actor/producer Michael Macready he would play the vampire role if they turned the story into a straight horror film. AIP head Samuel Z. Arkoff was responsible for changing the title from Iorga to Yorga to make it easier for buyers to pronounce. The film was made on a budget of approximately $100,000 and filmed on location in Los Angeles.

=== Difficulties with the MPAA ===
Stephen Farber's 1972 book, The Movie Rating Game, details the problems that the film's distributor American International Pictures had in securing a GP rating (formerly known as M, later renamed to PG) from the Motion Picture Association of America, which initially was divided as to whether to give the film an R or X rating. AIP insisted that they needed an unrestricted GP rating for the film in order to get the film released into the largest possible number of theaters, most importantly drive-in theaters.

The film ended up going before the MPAA ratings board six times before being granted the GP rating, and two or three minutes of violent and sexual content were ultimately removed by AIP. Alterations to the movie's soundtrack were also required to lessen the impact of violent scenes that remained in the film.

== Release ==
Count Yorga, Vampire premiered in Los Angeles on June 10, 1970, through American International Pictures. Its New York City release occurred later that fall, on November 11, 1970.

=== Home media ===
Count Yorga, Vampire has been the subject of several home video releases in nearly all formats since the 1980s. In April 1991, the film was packaged as a Laserdisc double feature (Catalog Number ID7661HB), paired with the Vincent Price horror film, Cry of the Banshee; both films were not letterboxed, but employed a full screen, pan-and-scan process.

In 2004, MGM's Midnite Movies DVD line (which redistributed much of the American International Pictures horror catalog previously owned by Orion Pictures Home Video) released Count Yorga, Vampire and its sequel, The Return of Count Yorga as a DVD double feature. Both films were presented in the widescreen format, and included original theatrical trailers.

In 2015, Twilight Time released the film on Blu-ray, limited to 3,000 units. In November 2022, Arrow Films released it as a double feature alongside its sequel, The Return of Count Yorga (1971), in a two-disc Blu-ray set.

== Reception ==
=== Box office ===
During its first week of release in the United States, the film earned $160,000 at the box office. By the end of 1970, the film had earned a total of $503,903 domestically. In North America, the film grossed a total of $1.3 million overall.

=== Critical response ===
Variety wrote that Robert Quarry had an "aristocratically handsome look and plays the part with a certain sinister intelligence (and) even a sly humor that befits a guy who has been around for several hundred years," adding that "The dialogue has a believable sound to it, and the playing of the principals is low-key and convincingly realistic." Roger Greenspun of The New York Times called Robert Quarry "the best chief vampire I have seen in years." Gene Siskel of the Chicago Tribune declared it "the best horror film of the year." Kevin Thomas of the Los Angeles Times wrote that "writer-director Bob Kelljan has freshened up the formula pretty well ... he and his attractive cast of unknowns do succeed in persuading us to go along with the hokum for the duration of the film's fast-moving 90 minutes." Kenneth Turan of The Washington Post called it "as good a horror film as we have had for some time" and "90 minutes of supremely diverting entertainment." Kenneth Thompson of The Monthly Film Bulletin wrote that "the understated acting and the tightly controlled, increasingly staccato tempo make this the most distinctive essay in the macabre since Night of the Living Dead."

== Legacy ==
After the sequel The Return of Count Yorga, a third Yorga film was planned, which would have featured a broken Count living in Los Angeles' sewers and creating an army of undead street people, but it never materialised.

American International Pictures had planned at one stage to revive Count Yorga as an adversary for Dr. Anton Phibes in Dr. Phibes Rises Again. This plan was dropped, however, and Quarry appeared as the artificially young Dr. Biederbeck.

== See also ==
- Vampire film
- Dracula

== Sources ==
- Donahue, Suzanne Mary (1987). American Film Distribution: The Changing Marketplace. Ann Arbor, Michigan: UMI Research Press. ISBN 978-0-835-71776-2.
- Smith, Gary A. (2017). Vampire Films of the 1970s. Jefferson, North Carolina: McFarland. ISBN 978-1-476-62559-1.
