= Marki Bey =

American actress

- Born: Marqueeta Bey; March 1, 1947 (age 78); Philadelphia, Pennsylvania, U.S.
- Occupation: Actress
- Years active: 1970–1982
- Spouse: Don Fenwick (m. 1974)

Marki Bey (born March 1, 1947) is an African American actress. She is best known for her role as Diana "Sugar" Hill in the 1974 horror blaxploitation zombie film Sugar Hill.

== Early life ==
Bey was born in Philadelphia, Pennsylvania.

== Career ==
Bey appeared in five films from 1970 to 1974, then concentrated on television work, appearing in popular television series such as Starsky and Hutch, Baretta and Charlie's Angels.

Since retiring from acting, Bey and her husband have operated Murder Mystery Cruises in Los Angeles, California.

== Personal life ==
On April 30, 1974, Bey married Don Fenwick, an actor. Bey is an avid stamp collector.

== Filmography ==
=== Film ===
- 1970 The Landlord - as Lanie.
- 1972 Class of '74
- 1973 The Roommates
- 1974 Sugar Hill - as Diana "Sugar" Hill.
- 1974 Hangup (aka Super Dude) -as Julie.

=== Television ===
- The Rookies (1975)
- Bronk (1975)
- Baretta (1977)
- Charlie's Angels (1977)
- Switch (1977)
- Starsky and Hutch (1977–79)
- Trapper John, M.D. (1979)
