= Henry Hathaway =

American film director and producer (1898–1985)

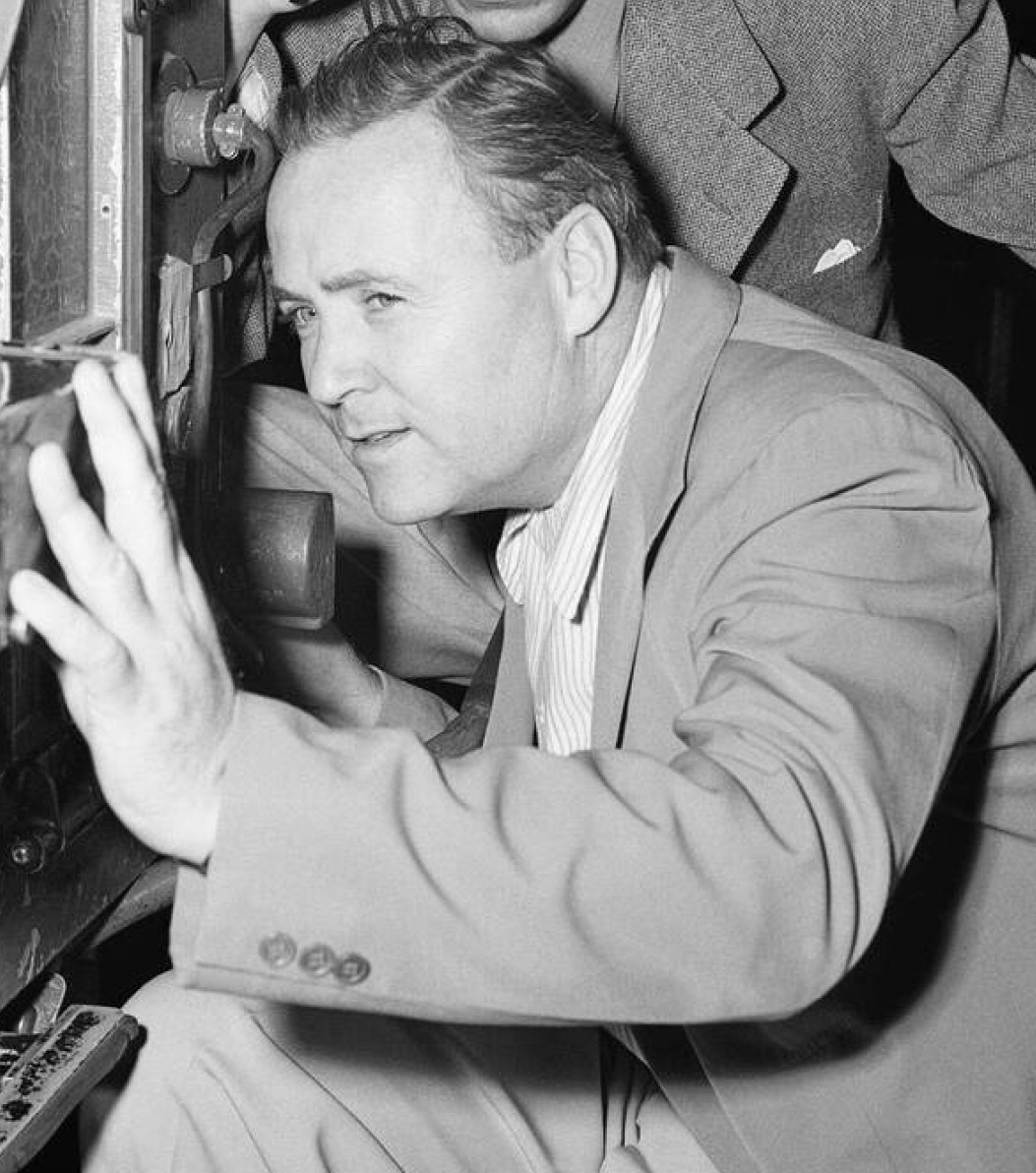
- Hathaway in 1944
- Born: Henri Léopold de Fiennes; March 13, 1898; Sacramento, California, U.S.
- Died: February 11, 1985 (aged 86); Los Angeles, California, U.S.
- Resting place: Holy Cross Cemetery, Culver City, California
- Occupations: Film director; film producer
- Years active: 1925–1974
- Spouse: Elvira Weil (m. 1919; div. 1931) Blanche "Skip" Gonzales (m. 1932)
- Children: 1
- Parents: Rhody Hathaway (father); Jean Hathaway (mother)

Henry Hathaway (born Henri Léopold de Fiennes; March 13, 1898 – February 11, 1985) was an American film director and producer, whose career spanned from the 1930s through the 1970s. He was best known as a director of Western, adventure, and noir films, especially starring John Wayne, Gary Cooper, Randolph Scott, and Gregory Peck. He was nominated for the Academy Award for Best Director for The Lives of a Bengal Lancer (1935), starring Cooper.

According to the BFI, Hathaway "epitomised what’s known as the ‘journeyman’ director."

== Early years ==
Hathaway was born Henri Léopold de Fiennes, in Sacramento, California, the son of actors Rhody and Jean Hathaway. The family's surname was originally "de Fiennes", and Henry inherited the noble title of "Marquis de Fiennes" (no relation to the Twisleton-Wykeham-Fiennes family) from his paternal great-grandfather J.B. de Fiennes, a Belgian nobleman and barrister in service to King Leopold I of Belgium. When his great-grandfather failed in his commission to secure the Sandwich Islands (now Hawaii) for Belgium, the disgraced elder Marquis self-exiled to San Francisco in 1850. There he established a law practice and married.

Rhody (real name: Henry Rudolph de Fiennes) was a theatrical manager and actor in San Francisco, where he met and married his Hungarian-born wife Jean (real name: Lillie Bishop). Some citations claim Hathaway was Jean's real maiden name.

== Early career ==
=== Juvenile roles and film technician, 1908-1917 ===
In 1908, at ten years of age, Hathaway began appearing as a child actor with the American Film Company under the mentorship of director Allan Dwan. Dwan's prolific output of one and two-reels shorts, filmed near the U.S.-Mexico border between 1908-1912, influenced Hathaway's later interest in Western-themed movies productions.

Hathaway left school in 1912 at the age of fourteen to become an assistant property master at Universal Pictures, and began playing adolescent roles in 1917. With the entry of the United States into World War I, Hathaway served as a gunnery instructor at Fort Winfield Scott in San Francisco for the duration of the conflict.

=== Assistant director, 1921-1932 ===
After his discharge from the U.S. Army in 1919, Hathaway made a brief but unsuccessful foray into high finance with the Morris Audit Company. He returned to Hollywood in 1921 as property man for producer/director Frank Lloyd, who was known for his adaptations of literary classics.

In 1923, Hathaway began working in silent films as an assistant to directors such as Victor Fleming and Josef von Sternberg, and made the transition to sound with them. He was the assistant director to Fred Niblo on the 1925 version of Ben-Hur starring Francis X. Bushman and Ramon Novarro. Hathaway continued as an assistant director through the remainder of the 1920s, helping direct such actors as Gary Cooper, Marlene Dietrich, Adolphe Menjou, Fay Wray, Walter Huston, Clara Bow, and Noah Beery.

== First films as director ==
=== Randolph Scott Westerns ===
Henry Hathaway made his directorial debut with a Western film production at Paramount, Heritage of the Desert (1932). Based on a Zane Grey novel, Hathaway gave Randolph Scott his first starring role in the film leading to his lengthy career in cowboy roles.

It began a series of Hathaway-directed Scott Westerns from Grey novels, Wild Horse Mesa (1932), The Thundering Herd (1933), Sunset Pass (1933), To the Last Man (1933), Man of the Forest (1933) and The Last Round-Up (1934).

Hathaway directed an action film set in the Philippines, Come On Marines! (1934) starring Richard Arlen and Ida Lupino, followed by a drama The Witching Hour (1934), and an early Shirley Temple film, Now and Forever (1934). The latter also starred Carole Lombard and Gary Cooper

=== Lives of a Bengal Lancer (1935) and Action Films ===
Hathaway's next film was with Cooper, The Lives of a Bengal Lancer (1935). Encouraged by director Paul Bern, Hathaway traveled to India for nine months in the 1920s to collect documentary footage on Hindu religious pilgrimages. The project was never completed, but Hathaway's experience with the Far East earned him an offer to direct The Lives of a Bengal Lancer.

Hathaway got the job because the film changed directors and Cooper, who had director approval, admired Hathaway's films. The movie was a hit and received seven Academy Award nominations, including Best Picture and for which Hathaway won his only nomination for the Academy Award for Directing.

Hathaway was now established as one of the main directors on the Paramount lot. He made another with Cooper, Peter Ibbetson (1935). This was followed by The Trail of the Lonesome Pine (1936), his first color movie, for which Walter Wanger borrowed him, paying him $1000 a week. He also worked on the troubled I Loved a Soldier (1936) which was never finished, and did a Mae West movie, Go West, Young Man (1936).

Hathaway was back with Cooper for the anti-slaving adventure story, Souls at Sea (1937), co-starring George Raft. With Raft and Henry Fonda he made Spawn of the North (1938).

The Real Glory (1939), with Cooper, was a reprise of Bengal Lancers set in the Philippines. After this he had a fight with Paramount and left to join Fox.

== 20th Century Fox ==
Hathaway worked for 20th Century Fox directing the studio's biggest male star, Tyrone Power, in Johnny Apollo (1940) and Brigham Young (1940). Hathaway adored working for Darryl Zanuck, calling him the finest filmmaker in America. He says he never turned down a script Zanuck offered him. "Some dogs, yes, but a lot of good ones too," he said.

He returned to Paramount to direct John Wayne in The Shepherd of the Hills (1941). For Walter Wanger, he made another Imperial action film, Sundown (1941).

Back at Fox he made Ten Gentlemen from West Point (1942), China Girl (1942), Wing and a Prayer (1944), Home in Indiana (1944) and Nob Hill (1945).

During the 1940s, Hathaway began making films using the semidocumentary style, often in the film noir genre. These included The House on 92nd Street (1945), for which he was nominated for a Best Director award by the New York Film Critics Circle, The Dark Corner (1946), 13 Rue Madeleine (1947), Kiss of Death (1947) and Call Northside 777 (1948), in which Hathaway presented one of the first on-screen uses of a Fax machine.

Hathaway returned to adventure films with Down to the Sea in Ships (1949). He was reunited with Power for The Black Rose (1950). After some time off for a cancer operation, Hathaway then made The Desert Fox: The Story of Rommel (1951), a biopic of General Rommel. It was followed by Fourteen Hours (1951), a noir about a man going to commit suicide, You're in the Navy Now (1951), a military comedy with Cooper, and two with Power: Rawhide (1951), a Western, and Diplomatic Courier (1952).

Hathaway directed the film noir Niagara (1953) which was Marilyn Monroe's breakthrough role, and White Witch Doctor (1953) with Susan Hayward and Robert Mitchum. He was reunited with Cooper on Garden of Evil (1954), a Western, then did the swashbuckler Prince Valiant (1954).

After The Racers (1955), with Zanuck's mistress Bella Darvi, Hathaway left Fox.

== Post-Fox career ==
Hathaway made two thrillers with Van Johnson: The Bottom of the Bottle (1956) and 23 Paces to Baker Street (1956).

John Wayne hired him to make Legend of the Lost in 1957 for Wayne's company. Back at Fox, he made the Western From Hell to Texas (1958). During filming, Dennis Hopper attempted to assert himself artistically on the set. Perhaps influenced by his recent experience with fellow actor James Dean's rebellious attitude on the sets of Rebel Without a Cause (1955) and Giant (1956), Hopper forced Hathaway to shoot more than 80 takes of a scene before he acquiesced to Hathaway's demands. After the shoot, Hathaway reportedly told the young actor that his career in Hollywood was over. Hopper later admitted he was wrong to have disrespected Hathaway as a youth and called him "the finest director I have ever worked with," and again worked with Hathaway on both The Sons of Katie Elder (1965) and True Grit (1969).

Hathaway then made a melodrama, Woman Obsessed (1959); and a thriller, Seven Thieves (1960). He was reunited with Wayne on the comedy-action "northern," North to Alaska (1960).

== Later career ==
Hathaway was one of three directors on the Cinerama Western How the West Was Won (1962), and directed the bulk of the film, including the river, prairie and train robbery sequences. He was meant to direct Wayne in McLintock! in 1963, but the producers would not meet his salary.

He visited Spain to work with Wayne again on Circus World (1964), on which Wayne asked Hathaway to cast John Smith in the role of Steve McCabe. From 1959 to 1963, Smith had played rancher Slim Sherman on NBC-TV's Laramie. An Internet biography of Smith claims that Hathaway developed an intense dislike for the actor and stopped him from landing choice roles thereafter in Hollywood.

Circus World was a box office disappointment, but Wayne and Hathaway's next movie together, The Sons of Katie Elder (1965), was a hit. So too was Nevada Smith (1966), a Western starring Steve McQueen with a story extrapolated from a brief section of Harold Robbins' novel The Carpetbaggers.

Hathaway went to Africa to make The Last Safari (1967), then directed the Western 5 Card Stud (1968) with Dean Martin and Robert Mitchum. It was a mild success, but True Grit (1969), produced by Hal B. Wallis, was a box office success and won John Wayne a Best Actor Oscar.

He stepped in for an ill George Seaton to direct some winter outdoor scenes for the all-star disaster film Airport (1970), featuring Burt Lancaster and Dean Martin. Hathaway did it as a favor for Seaton, for no payment or screen credit.

In 1971, he made a low-budget war movie with Richard Burton, Raid on Rommel (originally shot for TV but then released theatres), and then another Western for Wallis, Shoot Out. Hathaway's 65th and final film was Hangup (1974), a blaxploitation film starring William Elliott. He turned down the True Grit sequel Rooster Cogburn (1975), as he did not like the script.

== Personal life ==
Hathaway married silent film actress Elvira Weil (1899-1981) in 1919, they divorced in 1931. He re-married, to Blanche "Skip" Gonzales (1909-1995), the following year. They had one child.

=== Death ===
Hathaway died from complications of a heart attack at UCLA Medical Center in Los Angeles on February 11, 1985, at the age of 86. He is interred at Holy Cross Cemetery in Culver City, California. His body of work earned him a star on the Hollywood Walk of Fame at 1638 Vine Street.

== Filmography ==
- The Ten Commandments (assistant for Cecil B. DeMille – uncredited) (1923)
- Ben-Hur: A Tale of the Christ (assistant for B. Reeves Eason & assistant director – uncredited, 1925)
- The Rough Riders (assistant director, 1927)
- Heritage of the Desert (1932)
- Wild Horse Mesa (1932)
- The Thundering Herd (1933)
- Under the Tonto Rim (1933)
- Sunset Pass (1933)
- Man of the Forest (1933)
- To the Last Man (1933)
- The Witching Hour (1934)
- The Last Round-Up (1934)
- Now and Forever (1934)
- The Lives of a Bengal Lancer (1935)
- Peter Ibbetson (1935)
- The Trail of the Lonesome Pine (1936)
- Souls at Sea (1937)
- Spawn of the North (1938)
- The Real Glory (1939)
- Johnny Apollo (1940)
- Brigham Young (1940)
- The Shepherd of the Hills (1941)
- Sundown (1941)
- Ten Gentlemen from West Point (1942)
- China Girl (1942)
- Wing and a Prayer (1944)
- The House on 92nd Street (1945)
- The Dark Corner (1946)
- Kiss of Death (1947)
- 13 Rue Madeleine (1947)
- Call Northside 777 (1948)
- Down to the Sea in Ships (1949)
- The Black Rose (1950)
- You're in the Navy Now (1951)
- Fourteen Hours (1951)
- Rawhide (1951)
- The Desert Fox: The Story of Rommel (1951)
- Diplomatic Courier (1952)
- O. Henry's Full House (1952)
- Niagara (1953)
- Garden of Evil (1954)
- Prince Valiant (1954)
- The Bottom of the Bottle (1956)
- 23 Paces to Baker Street (1956)
- Legend of the Lost (director & producer – 1957)
- From Hell to Texas (1958)
- Woman Obsessed (1959)
- Seven Thieves (1960)
- North to Alaska (director & producer) (1960)
- How the West Was Won (segments "The Rivers", "The Plains", and "The Outlaws", 1962)
- Circus World (1964)
- The Sons of Katie Elder (1965)
- Nevada Smith (director & producer, 1966)
- The Last Safari (1967)
- 5 Card Stud (1968)
- True Grit (1969)
- Airport (some winter outdoor scenes only, 1970)
- Raid on Rommel (1971)
- Shoot Out (1971)
- Hangup (1974)
