= Midnite Movies =

B movie compilation by MGM Home Entertainment

- The three main mastheads for VHS and DVD releases
- Industry: Motion picture video production
- Genre: Science fiction/Horror/Cult
- Founder: MGM
- Products: VHS, DVD
- Owner: MGM

Midnite Movies is a line of B movies released first on VHS and later on DVD by MGM Home Entertainment. The line was launched by MGM in March 2001 following its acquisition of Orion Pictures, which bought out Filmways, the owner of American International Pictures (AIP). AIP, which was co-founded by James H. Nicholson and Samuel Z. Arkoff, had a library of B movies from the 1950s and 1960s that were primarily science fiction, horror, and exploitation films. The Midnite Movies collection was primarily derived from the AIP library, including most of Roger Corman and Vincent Price's horror films (Corman's first distribution company, The Filmgroup, was acquired by AIP in 1963), but also included films from other MGM-owned libraries, namely United Artists (UA) since 1981, Cannon Films since 1983, and Empire International Pictures since 1989. Films from British horror specialist Hammer Film Productions (the first Hammer production, The Public Life of Henry the Ninth, was initially distributed by MGM in 1935)and British film production company Amicus Productions were also licensed and released under the banner.

The DVDs were first released as single films, but most later releases would be double features on single double-sided discs. Later, box sets would also be released, such as the Midnite Movies Creepy Classics, a four-DVD collection including The Pit and the Pendulum, The Fall of the House of Usher, "X" The Man with the X-ray Eyes, and The Dunwich Horror. The "Midnite Movies" line continued as MGM Home Entertainment switched distributors twice in the mid-2000s, first to Sony Pictures Home Entertainment and then to 20th Century Fox Home Entertainment. Fox first began managing MGM’s international home video distribution in 1999, and their partnership expanded in 2006 when MGM signed a worldwide Blu-ray Disc and DVD distribution pact with Fox through 2016. Under Fox's tenure, the banner was expanded to include Fox library titles. Moving toward increased exclusive support for Blu-rays over HD DVDs, all double feature titles released during the Fox era were two-disc packages. By 2011, no new titles were forthcoming; the previous catalog titles slowly went out of print and the Midnite Movies website was taken down.

Beginning in 2013, independent media labels such as Shout! Factory (and sub-label Scream Factory), Kino Lorber Studio Classics, Twilight Time and Olive Films have licensed MGM-owned titles from the former Midnite Movies line for Blu-ray release.
