= James Iglehart =

American actor

- Born: September 12, 1949 (age 77); McLennan County, Texas, United States
- Other names: James Iglehardt; James Iglehart; Jim Iglehart
- Occupation: Actor
- Years active: 1969–1978
- Children: James Monroe Iglehart

James Iglehart (born September 12, 1949) is a former American actor who appeared in six films during the 1970s and was the leading actor in the 1973 blaxploitation film Savage!.

Iglehart also had a role as the violent womanizing Randy Black in the Russ Meyer directed 1970 film Beyond the Valley of the Dolls. In 1971 he had a role as Clay Rutherford in The Seven Minutes, which also featured Ron Randell, John Carradine and an up-and-coming Tom Selleck. Then he starred alongside Scott Glenn and Gary Busey in a violent biker exploitation flick, Angels Hard as They Come, a film that also featured Sharon Peckinpah, the daughter of director Sam Peckinpah.

In 1973 and 1974 he had lead roles as Cal Jefferson in Bamboo Gods And Iron Men, a Filipino Martial arts/blaxploitation film. In 1978 he appeared in Death Force, his last role alongside Carmen Argenziano and Felton Perry.

== Background ==
Iglehart played professional baseball before beginning a career as an actor. His son is film and stage actor James Monroe Iglehart who has found fame on Broadway.

== Career ==
=== Late 1960s to early 1970s ===
In 1970, Beyond the Valley of the Dolls was released. The Russ Meyer directed film also starred Dolly Read, Cynthia Myers, Marcia McBroom and John Lazar. His character Randy Black is a boxing champion who seduces another man's girlfriend and also tries to run him over with a car. Also that year he appeared in a couple of television shows. He played an officer in Headmaster which aired in October and two episodes of The Bold Ones: The Senator which aired in November that year.

In 1971, another Russ Meyer directed film, The Seven Minutes was released. Iglehart played the part of Clay Rutherford. Angels Hard as They Come was released the same year. It was directed by Joe Viola and produced by Jonathan Demme. The executive producer was Roger Corman. Iglehart played the part of Monk. It also starred Scott Glenn, Charles Dierkop, Gary Busey and Gilder Texter. The film was about a group of bikers that come across a group of drug-addicted hippies in a small town. Eventually this leads to conflict and chaos.

A 1973 release he starred in was Savage. In it he plays a criminal on the run who gets involved in a revolution against a military government. The setting is in a country that is controlled by a military dictatorship. His character Jim Haygood starts out working for the government to defeat rebel forces and capture a rebel leader called Moncada. Later he becomes appalled by thebrutal antics of his superiors, he subsequently sides with the rebels and becomes known under the nom de guerre "Savage". He is joined by two American friends who are performers at the local American club — knife-thrower Vicki and acrobat Amanda.

=== Mid to late 1970s ===
In 1974, Iglehart starred in the film Bamboo Gods and Iron Men which was directed by Cesar Gallardo and co-starred Shirley Washington. In it he played a famous American boxer who is taking his honeymoon in Manila and The Philippines. Somehow he gets involved in smuggling.

Death Force also known as Fighting Mad was directed by Cirio Santiago and released in 1978. Iglehart plays American Doug Russell, a US soldier who is heading home. After being betrayed and abandoned by his comrades, he is rescued by two WWII Japanese soldiers. They still believe that they are at war. He takes revenge with a Samurai sword with what he learnt from the Japanese soldiers. His four-year-old son James Monroe Iglehart also appeared in the film.

== Filmography ==
Television
Year	Tiltle	Role	Director	Episode	Notes #
1969	The New People	Hap	"The Prisoner of Bomano"	Corey Allen	Aired 29 December 1969
1970	Headmaster	Officer	"Will the Real Mother of Tony Landis Please Stand Up?"	Aaron Ruben	Aired 23 October 1970
1970	The Bold Ones: The Senator	1st Student	"A Continual Roar of Musketry: Part 1"	Robert Day	Aired 22 November 1970
1970	The Bold Ones: The Senator	1st Student	"A Continual Roar of Musketry: Part 2"	Robert Day	Aired 29 November 1970

Film
Year	Title	Role	Director	Notes #
1970	Beyond the Valley of the Dolls	Randy Black	Russ Meyer	
1971	The Seven Minutes	Clay Rutherford	Russ Meyer	
1971	Angels Hard as They Come	Monk	Joe Viola	
1973	Savage!	Jim Haygood	Cirio H. Santiago	
1974	Bamboo Gods and Iron Men	Cal Jefferson	Cesar Gallardo	
1978	Death Force	Doug Russell	Cirio H. Santiago	Also associate producer
1981	Body and Soul	No acting role (creative coordinator)	George Bowers	
