= Darnell Garcia =

American actor and martial artist

- Born: New York, United States
- Occupation: Former law enforcement officer
- Known for: Martial arts tournament winner

Darnell Garcia is a former martial arts champion, author, actor and former DEA agent. At one stage in his martial arts career he was rated 7th in the United States. He had roles in the martial arts films Enter the Dragon, Black Belt Jones, Blind Rage and Enforcer from Death Row. In the 1990s, Garcia became embroiled in a drug and corruption scandal.

== Background ==
Garcia was born in New York and grew up in California, and is of Puerto Rican heritage. His high school years were spent in California. While in Los Angeles, he wasn't the most popular with his neighbors due to his car racing. Garcia was thrown out of Manual Arts High School, but what possibly saved him was his gymnastic skills. The Washington High coach got Garcia on the team and he managed to keep out of trouble until he was able to graduate and get his high school diploma. He worked in a steel plant and then for an aircraft company. He was drafted into the army in 1966.

According to an article in the Los Angeles Sentinel dated January 21, 2016, Bridal Path Films were in negotiation with major studios to make a movie based on his life.

== Martial artist ==
Garcia began training in American Tang Soo Do in 1968 when he enrolled at a Chuck Norris Karate Studio in El Segundo, California. In 1972, Garcia earned his black belt from Chuck Norris under the tutelage of fellow Norris black belt Gheral Taylor. Garcia would then compete as a member of Norris' competition team. At the Grand National Championships, Garcia was fighting in his fifth tournament as a black belt. Garcia fought against Fred Wren and won 7–5. In December that year, and after only holding his black belt for a year, he competed in the 1972 International Karate Championships in Long Beach, California. Before a crowd of 8000, he won against champion Joe Lewis, taking the Grand Championship title. Garcia appeared on the cover of the February 1973 issue of Black Belt magazine and featured in a 7-page article.

Garcia appeared in the Elvis Presley financed documentary, The New Gladiators, released in 2002. The documentary which was begun in 1974 was deemed missing for many years then finally found and restored.

Garcia was also the advertising director for Inside Kung Fu magazine.

== Film work ==
=== Actor ===
By the age of 28, he had appeared in Black Belt Jones and Enter the Dragon. In Enter the Dragon, along with Mike Bissell and fellow Tang Soo Do instructor, Pat Johnson, he was one of the three hoods who come up to harass John Saxon on the golf course. He also appeared in Blind Rage and Enforcer from Death Row. The Efren C. Piñon directed Blind Rage, which was filmed in various locations including Manila was a tale about five blind men robbing a bank. Garcia was billed as one of the main actors. The film also starred D'Urville Martin, Leo Fong, Tony Ferrer, and Rick Adair and Fred Williamson. Garcia worked with Fong and Piñon again in Enforcer from Death Row. Later he appeared in Death Force, a 1978 film directed by Cirio H. Santiago which starred James Iglehart, Leon Isaac Kennedy, Jayne Kennedy and Carmen Argenziano.

=== Other film work ===
In addition to acting, Garcia worked for Fred Williamson with Williamson's company Po' Boy Productions. Garcia's work with Williamson was mainly behind the camera. He had moved into stunt work as well.

== Law enforcement career ==
Having been drafted into the army in 1966, Garcia eventually became a military policeman. He took exams during basic training and was only two points away from Officer Candidate School. That was enough to encourage himself to think deeper about where he could head to. He turned down offers to enroll in Warrant Officer Flight School and became a military policeman. After graduating from Leadership Training School in Georgia, he was sent to Anchorage, Alaska. While there he served as a stockade guard, the personal bodyguard to a very senior medical officer and also managed to talk a prisoner out of killing himself. Garcia had seven letters of commendation by the time he finished his military service in 1968. He then returned to Los Angeles.

Prior to his becoming a DEA agent, he was with the LAPD. In 1985 Garcia was fired by the DEA because he refused a transfer to Detroit. A case was made on the basis of national origin discrimination and it went to court. In 1986 he won his right to be reinstated in a decision by the U.S. 9th Circuit Court of Appeals.

In the early 1990s, Garcia and fellow agents, John Jackson and Wayne Countryman appeared in court for stealing drugs and money laundering. In 1991, Countryman was sentenced to 5 years. In 1997, Garcia was sentenced to 80 years imprisonment for his part in drug trafficking and money laundering. Garcia was eventually released from federal prison in November 2011, having served 21 years.

== Publications ==
Title	Isbn	Publisher	Year	Notes #
Explosive Instinct and Mind Power		Koinonia Productions	1978	
The Fighting Art of Tang Soo Do	ISBN 9780865680142	Unique Publications	1982	

== Filmography ==
Year	Title	Role	Director	Notes #
1973	Enter the Dragon	Hood	Robert Clouse	
1974	Black Belt Jones	Unknown	Robert Clouse	
1975	Bamboo Trap	Unknown	Ernesto Ventura	
1976	The Outside Man	Unknown	Efren C. Piñon	
1976	Ninja Assassins	Unknown	Marshall M. Borden, Efren C. Piñon	
1976	Blind Rage	Hector Lopez	Efren C. Piñon	Also Production Coordinator
1977	Mr. Mean	Unknown	Fred Williamson	Uncredited role
1978	Death Force	Hitman	Cirio H. Santiago	
1984	Killpoint	Karate Fighter	Frank Harris	
2001	Wolfen	Unknown	Michael Wadleigh; John D. Hancock; Rupert Hitzig	Uncredited role
2002	The New Gladiators	Himself	Bob Hammer	
