= The Seven Minutes =

1969 novel by Irving Wallace

- First edition
- Author: Irving Wallace
- Language: English
- Subject: Pornography; Political science
- Genre: Legal thriller
- Publisher: Simon & Schuster
- Publication place: United States
- English publication date: September 29, 1969
- Pages: 607
- ISBN: 0-671-20359-2

The Seven Minutes is a novel by Irving Wallace published in 1969 and released by Simon & Schuster. The book is a fictional account of the effects of pornography and the related arguments about freedom of speech.

== Synopsis ==
A novel titled The Seven Minutes, purporting to be the thoughts in a woman's mind during seven minutes of sexual intercourse, is reputed to be the most obscene piece of pornography ever written, with massive public debate as to whether or not the book should be banned. A bookseller named Ben Fremont sells The Seven Minutes to Jeffrey Griffith, a college student with no history of violence. The book is found in Jeffrey's possession after his arrest for committing a brutal rape and murder.

District Attorney Elmo Duncan takes advantage of the public interest in the case and conspires to publicly link The Seven Minutes with the Jeffrey Griffith trial. His plan is to not only ban the book, but to make possessing it illegal on the grounds of public morality and safety. Ultimately he wishes to use this platform of moral decency to unseat the current senator, Thomas Bainbridge, in an upcoming election. Luther Yerkes, a wealthy businessman who has clashed with the incumbent senator, secretly funds Duncan's censorship campaign. This leads to the arrest of Ben Fremont for providing the book to Griffith, as well as legal action leveled at the book's publisher Phillip Sanford as he refuses to cooperate in an attempt to locate its pseudonymous author J.J. Jadway. Sanford claims that Jadway committed suicide in Europe years before due to despondency over the book's reception.

Sanford, believing the book is an artistic masterpiece and that legal action represents a dangerous precedent, calls upon his old friend, attorney Michael Barrett, to defend Fremont. This results in a landmark obscenity trial in which numerous witnesses are called to speak on the difference between artistic expression and obscenity and the public good versus freedom of choice.

Unexpectedly, Senator Bainbridge takes the stand in the book's defense. Bainbridge reveals that he wrote The Seven Minutes based on a powerful sexual experience that changed his life. At the time he wrote the book, it would have been damaging for him to reveal himself as its author, therefore he invented the name J.J. Jadway and had his publisher Phillip Sanford spread rumors of Jadway's death to protect his identity. In fact, much of his testimony is motivated by a desire to separate sexual openness and honesty, which he believes is a public good, from harmful exploitation.

After Bainbridge's testimony, the jury finds the book not obscene. The prosecutor vows to try the case again in a different part of the state, but defense attorney Barrett states that it is ridiculous to restrict what people are allowed to read in the privacy of their own homes or to use art as a scapegoat for much deeper societal issues.

== Adaptation ==
The book was made into the film The Seven Minutes, directed by Russ Meyer in 1971, with Philip Carey, John Carradine, Wayne Maunder, Tom Selleck, and Yvonne De Carlo.

== In popular culture ==
The Olympia Press of Maurice Girodias, who was interviewed by Wallace during research for his book, published the novel The Original Seven Minutes, and its author on the title page was J.J. Jadway; its content followed the indications in Wallace's novel. In other words, if Wallace's novel dealt with an allegedly obscene, fictional book, Olympia Press claimed to be the publishers. Following legal action by Wallace, the book was withdrawn, and later republished as The Seven Erotic Minutes with the purported author's name and all references to Wallace removed.

In the epilogue to the novel Eleven Minutes, Paulo Coelho cites Irving Wallace's book as a source of inspiration.
