= Blind Rage =

Blind Rage may refer to:

- Blind rage, uncontrollable, psychologically-blinding rage
- Blind Rage (film), a 1978 blaxploitation film
- Blind Rage (album), an album by heavy metal band Accept
- "Blind Rage" (The Incredible Hulk), a 1979 television episode
