= Darktown Strutters =

1975 film by William Witney

- Film poster by John Solie
- Directed by: William Witney
- Written by: George Armitage
- Produced by: Gene Corman
- Starring: Trina Parks; Roger E. Mosley; Shirley Washington; Bettye Sweet; Stan Shaw
- Cinematography: Joao Fernandes
- Edited by: Morton Tubor
- Music by: The Stax Organization
- Production company: Penelope Productions
- Distributed by: New World Pictures
- Release date: October 8, 1975
- Running time: 83 minutes
- Country: United States
- Language: English

Darktown Strutters is a 1975 blaxploitation musical comedy film from New World Pictures.

The film initially focuses on a female gang of outlaw bikers and their interactions with a rival gang, with the local police, and with the United States Marines. Later, one of the female bikers searches for her missing mother.

== Plot ==
A gang of four female bikers, Syreena, Carmen, Miranda, and Theda, pull into a roadside dinner where they get in a fight with 3 US Marines, pieing them with the lemon meringue pies they ordered. They win the fight, and proceed to drive off while humming the Marine corps hymn. Later a group of comically militarized cops pull them over and demand to see their driver's licenses. One fat cop is stuck in the police cruiser and Syreena walks over and demands to see his driver's license. They argue briefly then leave, but the cops crash into a group of bank robbers while exiting the parking lot. The girls drive to Sky hog BBQ where they meet a rival gang of men who challenge them to a race around the police station. Syreena races the rival leader named Mellow. The police are sitting in their car as it's being washed by the inmates as the two race past them. Two English looking policemen briefly pursue them with horses, but they get away. During the race, they see the Ku Klux Klan in the back of a box truck, remarking that "they're back". Syreena beats Mellow in the race, and the two head back to their biker hang out.

The two gangs fraternize for a bit and Syreena and Mellow get intimate in a comedic way. The police show up to arrest the gang member named Wired, for supposedly doing drugs. They batter though the door using one of the officer's head like a battering ram. Wired is seen convulsing, but the police remark that "he's always like that." Later Syreena drives to a dingy neighborhood to find an abandoned house with her brother Laz, who greets her by jumping out the window with a kung fu kick. She asks him if he knows where her mother, Cinderella, is, but he says that he hasn't seen her for 10 days. He reenters the house by smashing through the door. Syreena asks where he learned his kung fu, but he retorts that it is "way beyond kung fu, it's an ancient African martial art practiced by the imperial guards of the Zambezi river."

A man named Commander Cross (who is a parody of Colonel Sanders) is seen speaking to black people gathered outside his mansion. He is speaking about his efforts of the Cross foundation to enrich the welfare of black people. Syreena pulls up in her motorcycle dressed as a nun. She meets with a maid working at the mansion and asks her if she knows where her mother is, but she doesn't know, but says her mother was possibly involved with abortions. She suggests she ask the local detective.

The cops from before are seen discussing the locations of criminals on a map console labeled "Ghetto Alert Map" when suddenly the alarm lights up, startling them into action. Syreena is at the police station disguised as a cop, and informs the cops that the alert is at the police station, saying "This is 77th and Normandy." Syreena meets the detective, seeing him in a dress and remarks that she "expected a straight," to which he retorts "don't be too sure I'm not." He explains that he's investigating a white female rapist who targets "black faggots" as he applies blackface to himself. She questions him about her missing mother to which he reports that he's busy investigating the disappearance of several prominent black males. The other cops appear and shoot him, thinking he is black, before he is able to leave the station.

The two gangs are seen enjoying themselves at a carnival until the KKK appears and gets in a fight with them. The police show up and calm the fight, but another prominent black man gets abducted.

Syreena visits her uncle who owns a junk store and he directs her to a pimp named Philo Raspberry. She questions him about the location of her mother, but he claims he's busy already looking for the missing men. She spits her champagne in his face. She's about to leave empty-handed, but a girl comes up to her impressed by her standing up to Raspberry. She explains that another girl might have information on her mother, a girl named Lexie who worked with her as a prostitute for a pimp named Casabah Volt. She then travels with her gang to meet him where he operates a middle eastern themed brothel. They interrogate Volt on the location of Lexie. At first, he is unwilling to talk, but they threaten him with a resident gang member who is dirty enough to contaminate all his prostitutes with a single touch. He tells them about an ice cream man named cowboy dealer who sells ice cream mixed with drugs. They once again threaten him and he in turn leads them to the freezer building where Lexie is.

Lexie admits that she doesn't know where her mother is, but says she was involved with a runaway house that her mother was at. She says she was drugged at one point and woke up pregnant. With the help of her brother, Syreena captures Raspberry and questions him on his involvement with the runaway house. He admits that he is an intermediary between them and the cross foundation.

Syreena is chased by the KKK and captured. She is brought to Colonel Cross' mansion where he is wearing a pig costume. He explains that he is using a cloning machine to replace heads of the black community to control the black vote.

She escapes, leading to a large motorcycle chase sequence with the KKK, but she evades them and links up with other bikers. The black community fights with the colonel, his clones, and the KKK. Finally, they rescue Cinderella, Syreena's mother and watch as the cloning machine gives birth to another colonel, who walks up to Syreena and hugs her, calling her mama.

== Cast ==
- Trina Parks as Syreena
- Edna Richardson as Carmen
- Bettye Sweet as Miranda
- Shirley Washington as Theda
- Roger E. Mosley as "Mellow"
- Christopher Joy as "Wired"
- Stan Shaw as "Raunchy"
- DeWayne Jessie as V.D.
- Norman Bartold as Commander Cross
- Dick Miller as Officer Hugo
- Milt Kogan as Officer Babel
- Gene Simms as "Flash"
- Sam Laws as Philo Raspberry
- Ed Bakey as Reverend S. Tilly
- Raymond Allen as "Six Bits"
- Alvin Childress as Bo
- Zara Cully as Lorelai

== Production ==
The film was written by George Armitage, who had worked with producer Gene Corman before. Armitage:

I wrote Darktown Strutters in three days, and the script form is all one sentence, the entire script is one sentence. I just did it to have fun. I was going to direct it, but I had another script that I sold called Trophy, which was about two police departments who end up in a shooting war, and it was really a labor of love, so I asked Gene to excuse me to work on that, but it never got made, unfortunately. So Joe Viola came in to direct Darktown Strutters, but then he left the project and William Witney came in. And he was fantastic—I was an old Roy Rogers fan and he'd done so many of those...

== Release ==
According to Armitage, a test screening was set up in which the producers took suggestions to "punch up" the film, and one of the attendants invited by Gene Corman was Richard Pryor. "I remember about three-quarters of the way through I looked down in the aisle, and Richard was crawling out. He obviously didn't care for the film, but was crawling up the aisle so nobody would see him, and he escaped. So he didn't contribute much to the movie, other than giving them a reason to say: 'Hm, maybe there's some work to be done here?' Still, I enjoyed that movie, I thought Witney did a good job, and it's a lot of fun."

The film was produced by Gene Corman for a company in Tennessee which was unable to secure its release. Corman then sent it to his brother Roger who released it through New World Pictures. It was re-released in 1977 under the title Get Down and Boogie.

== Legacy ==
Despite having mixed reviews at the time of its release, it has gained cult status over the years with praise from film director Quentin Tarantino. Tarantino called it "a ridiculous satire".

== See also ==
- List of American films of 1975
