= Don Julian =

Don Julian is the name of:

- Don Julian (musician) (1937–1998), American funk and soul guitarist and composer
- Julian, Count of Ceuta (7th-century–8th-century), North African ruler who had a role in the Umayyad conquest of Hispania
- William "Don Julian" Workman, (1799-1876), California rancher and landowner
