= The Hot Box =

1972 film by Joe Viola

- Theatrical release poster
- Directed by: Joe Viola
- Written by: Joe Viola; Jonathan Demme
- Produced by: Jonathan Demme; Cirio H. Santiago
- Starring: Carmen Argenziano
- Music by: Restie Umali
- Distributed by: New World Pictures
- Release date: May 1972
- Country: United States
- Language: English
- Budget: $181,000

The Hot Box is a 1972 women in prison film from Joe Viola and Jonathan Demme, who had previously made Angels Hard as They Come (1971) for New World Pictures. It was shot in the Philippines and was originally known as The Prescription Revolution.

== Plot ==
Four American nurses working in the Republic of San Rosario are kidnapped by a band of guerrillas.

== Cast ==
- Carmen Argenziano as Flavio
- Andrea Cagan as Bunny Kincaid
- Margaret Markov as Lynn Forrest
- Rickey Richardson as Ellie St. George
- Laurie Rose as Sue Pennwright
- Zaldy Zschornack as Ronaldo Montoya
- Jose Romulo as Crao
- Rocco Montalban as Carragiero
- Charles Dierkop as Garcia, The Journalist / Major Dubay
- Gina Laforteza as Florida
- Ruben Ramos as Mimmo
- Ruben Rustia

== Production ==
The film came about because Roger Corman had a production deal in the Philippines with a young producer there, Cirio Santiago. Corman wanted to give Santiago a story outline and Viola did up a treatment in an afternoon, which became the film. Jonathan Demme shot some second unit footage, which impressed Roger Corman enough to support Demme's debut as director for Caged Heat (1974).

== See also ==
- List of American films of 1972
