= Fury on Wheels =

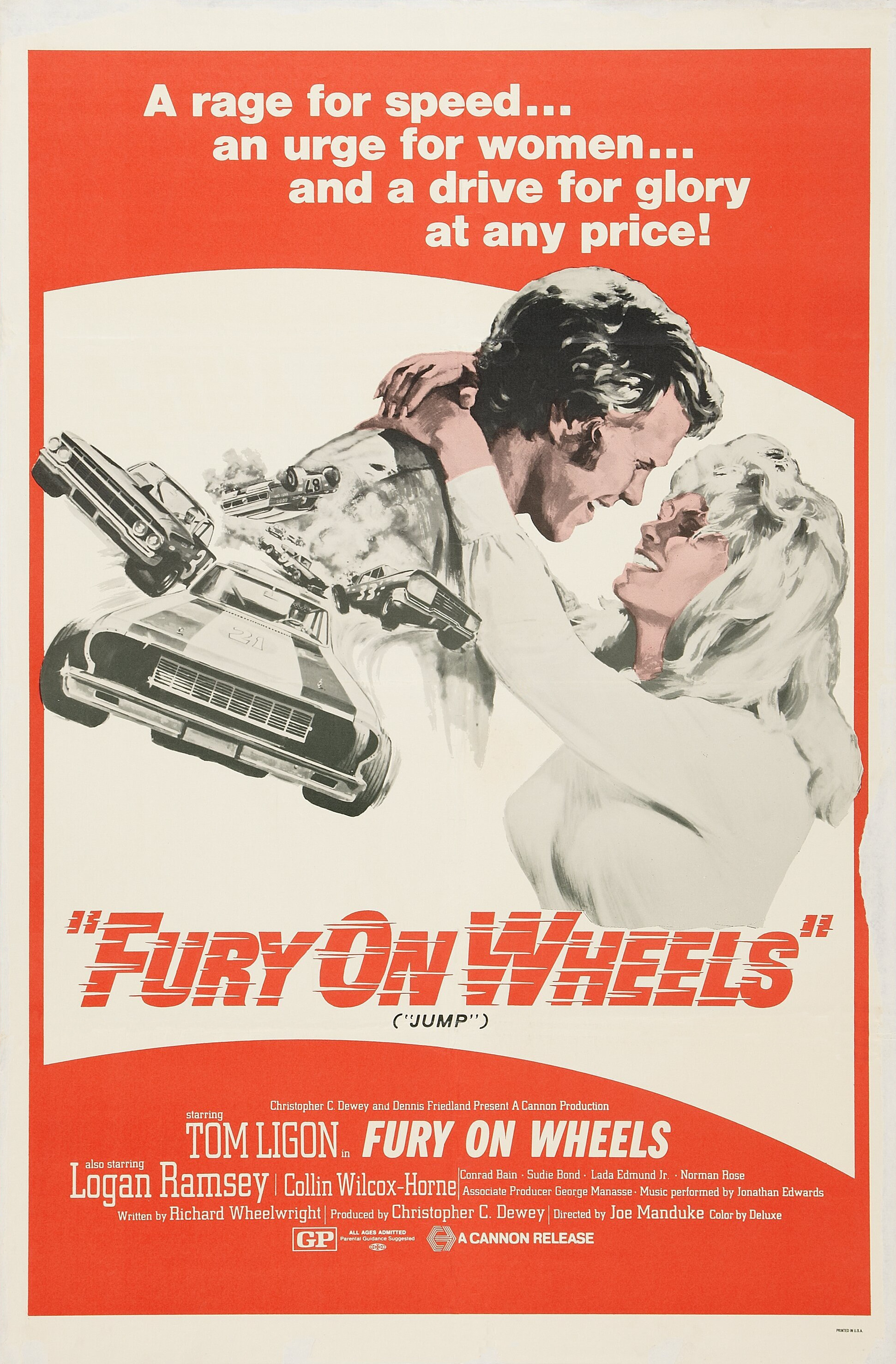
- Theatrical release poster
- Directed by: Joseph Manduke
- Starring: Tom Ligon; Logan Ramsey; Collin Wilcox; Lada Edmund Jr. Norman Rose
- Production company: Cannon Films
- Release date: 1971
- Country: United States
- Language: English

Fury on Wheels, also known as Jump, is a 1971 American car racing film.

Racing sequences were filmed at the now defunct Golden Gate Speedway in Tampa, Florida. Many local drivers can be seen.

== Cast ==
- Tom Ligon - Chester Jump
- Logan Ramsey - Babe Duggers
- Collin Wilcox - April Mae
- Norman Rose - Dutchman
- Lada Edmund Jr. - Enid
- Sudie Bond - Ernestine Jump
- Conrad Bain - Lester Jump
- Bette Craig - Beulah
- Vicky Lynn - Mercy Jump
- Jack Nance - Ace
- Sally Kirkland - Lou (uncredited)
