= Custer (TV series) =

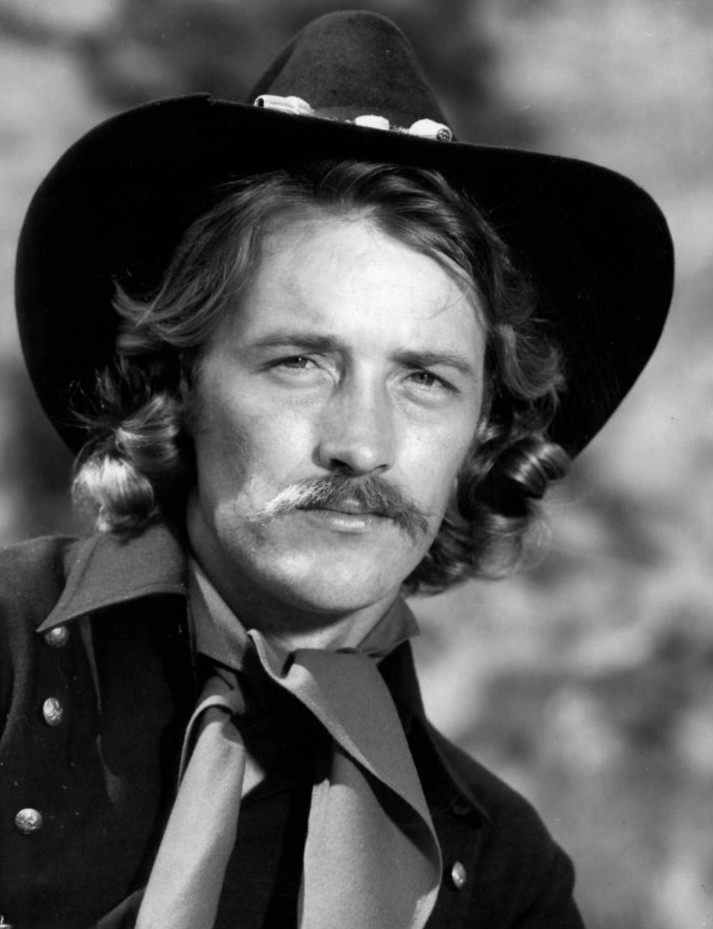
- Wayne Maunder as Custer.
- Starring: Wayne Maunder; Slim Pickens; Robert F. Simon; Michael Dante; Peter Palmer; Grant Woods
- Composers: Richard Markowitz (1.1); Leith Stevens (1.1, 1.5, 1.7, 1.13; and theme music); Robert Drasnin (1.12); Harry Geller (1.14); Irving Gertz (1.15); Joseph Mullendore (1.17, as "MULLENDORE")
- Country of origin: United States
- No. of seasons: 1
- No. of episodes: 17

Production
- Producer: Frank Glicksman
- Running time: 60 minutes

Original release
- Network: ABC
- Release: September 6 – December 27, 1967

Custer, also known as The Legend of Custer, is a 17-episode military-Western television series which ran on ABC from September 6 to December 27, 1967, with Wayne Maunder in the starring role of then Lieutenant Colonel George Armstrong Custer. Criticizing the series as "glamorizing Custer," a concerted protest headed by the Tribal Indians Land Rights Association successfully halted broadcast of the series under the FCC fairness doctrine.

== Format ==
Robert F. Simon played Custer's commanding officer, U.S. General Alfred H. Terry. Slim Pickens starred as California Joe Milner. Michael Dante appeared as Sioux Chief Crazy Horse. Peter Palmer played Sergeant James Bustard, a former Confederate soldier. Grant Woods appeared as Captain Myles Keogh. Read Morgan appeared in the episode "Spirit Woman" in the role of a medicine man.

Guest stars included Lloyd Bochner (as James Stanhope), Rory Calhoun (as Zebediah Jackson), Philip Carey (as Benton Conant), James Daly (as John Rudford), Alexander Davion (as Capt. Marcus A. Reno), Burr DeBenning (as Uvalde), Yvonne De Carlo (as Vanessa Ravenhill), Gene Evans (as Deedricks), Arthur Franz (as Grey Fox and Bledsoe), Billy Gray (as Billy Nixon), Barbara Hale (as Melinda Terry), Stacy Harris (as John Glixton), Earl Holliman (as Dan Samuels), Robert Loggia (as Lt. Carlos Moreno), Darren McGavin (as Jeb Powell), Ralph Meeker (as Kermit Teller), Mary Ann Mobley (as Ann L'Andry), Agnes Moorehead (as Watoma), Edward Mulhare (as Col. Sean Redmond), Kathleen Nolan (as Nora Moffett), Larry Pennell (as Chief Yellow Hawk), Paul Petersen (as Lieutenant Cox), Donnelly Rhodes (as War Cloud), Chris Robinson (as Lt. Tim Rudford), Ned Romero (as Running Feet), Barbara Rush (as Brigid O'Rourke), Albert Salmi (as Capt. John Mark Charrington), William Smith (as Chief Tall Knife), Dub Taylor (as Trader), Ray Walston (as Ned Quimbo), James Whitmore (as Eldo), Terry Wilson (as Brownsmith), and William Windom (as Clark Samson). In the last episode titled "The Raiders", Custer enlists the aid of Kiowa Indians to help him to locate the parties responsible for a series of wagon train raids.

Maunder was twenty-eight when he was cast as the 28-year-old Custer. The show was canceled due to poor reviews and protests by Native American tribes throughout the United States.

Two episodes, No. 1 and No. 6, were later combined and released as a feature length film, titled "Crazy Horse and Custer, The Untold Story". On June 7, 2016, Shout! Factory released Custer: The Complete Series (Collector's Edition) on DVD.

== Episodes ==
No. in season	Title	Directed by	Written by	Original release date
1	"Sabers in the Sun"	Sam Wanamaker	Samuel A. Peeples	September 6, 1967
2	"Accused"	Lawrence Dobkin	Al C. Ward	September 13, 1967
3	"Glory Rider"	Lawrence Dobkin	Jack Turley	September 20, 1967
4	"To the Death"	Herschel Daugherty	Samuel A. Peeples	September 27, 1967
5	"Massacre"	Herschel Daugherty	Daniel Mainwaring	October 4, 1967
6	"War Lance and Saber"	Norman Foster	Shimon Wincelberg	October 11, 1967
7	"Suspicion"	Alex March	John Dunkel	October 18, 1967
8	"Breakout"	László Benedek	Shimon Wincelberg	November 1, 1967
9	"Desperate Mission"	László Benedek	Warren Douglas	November 8, 1967
10	"Under Fire"	Lawrence Dobkin	Arthur Browne Jr.	November 15, 1967
11	"Death Hunt"	Leo Penn	Steve McNeil & Richard Bartlett	November 22, 1967
12	"Blazing Arrows"	Christian Nyby	Bob and Wanda Duncan	November 29, 1967
13	"Dangerous Prey"	Leo Penn	Richard Sale	December 6, 1967
14	"Spirit Woman"	László Benedek	William Blinn	December 13, 1967
15	"The Gauntlet"	Don Richardson	Shimon Wincelberg	December 20, 1967
16	"The Raiders"	Norman Foster	Shimon Wincelberg	December 27, 1967
17	"Pursued"	Leo Penn	John Dunkel	January 3, 1968
