= Gilda Texter =

American actress

Gilda Texter (born November 26, 1946) is an American costume designer, wardrobe supervisor and actress.

== Career ==
Gilda Texter is a costume designer who worked in the costume and wardrobe departments of over 40 movies and television productions.

Her feature film debut was in the 1971 cult movie Vanishing Point, where she appeared nude riding a motorcycle, and was credited as "Nude Rider" (her character was never named).

Texter appeared in two other movies, also released in 1971: Angels Hard as They Come and Runaway, Runaway.

== Filmography ==
=== Costume Supervisor ===
- Romancing the Stone (1984)
- Air America (1990)
- Revenge (1990)
- Snake Eyes (1998)
- The Green Mile (1999)
- Love Don't Cost a Thing (2003)
- Garfield: The Movie (2004)
- Lonely Hearts (2006)

=== Costumer ===
- The Majestic (2001)
- Herbie: Fully Loaded (2005)

=== Actress ===
- The Gun Runner (1969) - Gilda
- House of Zodiac (1969)
- Vanishing Point (1971) - Nude Rider
- Angels Hard as They Come (1971) - Astrid
- Runaway, Runaway (1971) - Rikki (final film role)
