= Savage! (1973 theatrical film) =

1973 film by Cirio H. Santiago

- Film poster for Savage! by John Solie
- Directed by: Cirio H. Santiago
- Written by: Ed Medard
- Produced by: Cirio H. Santiago
- Starring: James Iglehart; Lada Edmund, Jr. Carol Speed
- Cinematography: Philip Sacdalan
- Edited by: Richard Patterson
- Music by: Don Julian
- Distributed by: New World Pictures
- Release date: May 1973
- Running time: 81 min
- Country: United States
- Language: English

Savage! is a 1973 American-Philippines action film with elements of blaxploitation. The funding and distribution came from Roger Corman's New World Pictures which also provided the leading players from among a number of American actors who regularly appeared in such features. It was produced and directed by Cirio H. Santiago who, between 1973 and his death in 2008, partnered with Corman on over 40 Philippines-based action-adventure exploitation films which took advantage of much lower local production costs.

The title role is played by top-billed James Iglehart, with co-stars Lada Edmund, Jr. and Carol Speed. As in most such productions of the 1970s and 1980s, the setting is not identified as the Philippines, but rather an unspecified Latin American location ruled by a military-based authoritarian regime.

The soundtrack is by Don Julian.

== Plot ==
The main character played by James Iglehart is a criminal on the run who gets involved in a revolution against a military government. An unnamed tropical country in Central or South America is governed by a military dictatorship. Jim Haygood starts out working for the government to defeat rebel forces and capture the rebel leader Moncada. Later he becomes appalled by his superiors' abuses and brutality, subsequently sides with the rebels and becomes known under the nom de guerre "Savage". He is joined by two American friends who are performers at the local American club — knife-thrower Vicki and acrobat Amanda.

== Cast ==
- James Iglehart as Savage
- Lada Edmund, Jr. as Vicki (later billed as Lada St. Edmund)
- Carol Speed as Amanda
- Sally Jordan as Sylvia
- Rossana Ortiz as Julia
- Ken Metcalfe as Melton
- Vic Diaz as Minister
- Aura Aurea as "China"
- Eddie Gutierrez as Flores
- Harley Paton
- Marie Saunders

== See also ==
- List of American films of 1973
