= Wonder Women (1973 film) =

- Directed by: Robert O'Neil
- Screenplay by: Lou Whitehill
- Adaptation by: Robert O'Neil
- Produced by: Ross Hagen
- Starring: Nancy Kwan; Ross Hagen; Maria De Aragon; Roberta Collins; Tony Lorea; Sid Haig; Vic Diaz; Claire Polan; Shirley Washington
- Cinematography: Ricardo M. David
- Edited by: Richard Greer
- Music by: Carson Whitsett
- Production company: General Film Corporation
- Distributed by: General Film Corporation
- Release date: April 1973
- Running time: 82 minutes
- Country: United States
- Language: English

Wonder Women is a 1973 American action film directed by Robert Vincent O'Neil, and starring Nancy Kwan, Ross Hagen, and Roberta Collins. Filming took place in the Philippines.

== Plot ==
Dr Tsu's wonder women brings the world's greatest athletes to her Philippine lab, where parts are removed for resale.

== Cast ==
- Nancy Kwan as Dr. Tsu
- Ross Hagen as Mike Harber
- Maria De Aragon as Linda
- Roberta Collins as Laura
- Tony Lorea as Paulson / Lorenzo
- Sid Haig as Gregorious
- Vic Diaz as Lapu-Lapu
- Claire Polan as Vera
- Shirley Washington as Maggie
- Gail Hansen as Gail
- Eleanor Siron as Mei-Ling
- Bruno Punzalan as Nono the Fisherman
- Joonee Gamboa as Won Ton Charlie
- Leila Benitez as Lillian Taylor
- Ross Rival as Ramon the Jai-Alai Player
