= Death Force =

1978 martial arts exploitation film by Cirio H. Santiago

- Theatrical release poster
- Directed by: Cirio H. Santiago
- Written by: Howard R. Cohen
- Story by: Cirio H. Santiago; Robert E. Waters
- Produced by: Robert E. Waters
- Starring: James Iglehart; Carmen Argenziano; Leon Isaac Kennedy; Jayne Kennedy
- Cinematography: Ricardo Remias
- Distributed by: Caprican 3
- Release date: November 15, 1978
- Running time: 96 minutes 110 minutes (uncut version)
- Countries: United States; Philippines
- Language: English

Death Force (also known as Vengeance Is Mine) is a 1978 martial arts exploitation film directed by Cirio H. Santiago and written by Howard R. Cohen. The film is an international co-production of the Philippines and the United States, and stars blaxploitation actor James Iglehart alongside Carmen Argenziano, Leon Isaac Kennedy, and Jayne Kennedy. Iglehart plays Doug Russell, a veteran of the Vietnam War turned gold smuggler who is left for dead by his partners and, after being trained to wield a samurai sword by a Japanese soldier, seeks revenge on those who betrayed him. Iglehart's real son, James Monroe Iglehart appears briefly as Jimmy Russell, Doug's infant son.

== Plot ==
American soldiers Doug Russell (James Iglehart), McGee (Leon Isaac Kennedy) and Morelli (Carmen Argenziano) serving in Vietnam are selling gold bars on the black market. Upon their arrival stateside Morelli convinces McGee to betray Russell. Believing that they killed Russell, Morelli and McGee begin taking over the criminal underworld in Los Angeles. Meanwhile, Russell washes up on a beach of a Pacific Island. There he is discovered by two surviving Japanese soldiers who have been on the Island since before World War II. The senior officer decides to teach Russell the ways of Samurai sword fighting. After healing up and learning all the knowledge to defeat his enemies Russell heads to Los Angeles. He finds his family is gone and his enemies are now in charge of all crime in the city. Russell begins dismantling Morelli and McGee's crime syndicate one member at a time. Once Russell exacts revenge against Morelli and McGee he is reunited with his wife Maria (Jayne Kennedy) and son Jimmy (James Monroe Iglehart).

== Cast ==
- James Iglehart as Doug Russell
- Carmen Argenziano as Morelli
- Leon Isaac Kennedy as McGee
- Jayne Kennedy as Maria Russell
- Jose Mari Avellana
- Joonee Gamboa
- James Monroe Iglehart as Jimmy Russell
- Armando Federico as Rico
- Darnell Garcia as Hitman
- Vic Diaz as Chinaman

== Home media ==
In September 2013, Death Force was released on DVD by Vinegar Syndrome as a double feature with the 1978 film Vampire Hookers, which was also directed by Santiago. In June 2014, Death Force was released on DVD and Blu-ray in Germany by Subkultur Entertainment.
