= Bamboo Gods and Iron Men =

Bamboo Gods And Iron Men
- Bamboo Gods & Iron Men movie poster
- Directed by: Cesar Gallardo
- Written by: Ken Metcalfe; Joseph Zucchero
- Produced by: Cirio H. Santiago
- Starring: James Iglehart; Shirley Washington; Chiquito; Ken Metcalfe; Eddie Garcia; Marissa Delgado
- Cinematography: Felipe Sacdalan
- Edited by: Gervacio Santos
- Music by: Tito Sotto
- Distributed by: American International Pictures; Premiere Productions
- Release date: February 13, 1974
- Running time: 96 minutes
- Countries: Hong Kong; Philippines
- Language: English

Bamboo Gods and Iron Men is a 1974 martial arts comedy film set in the Philippines. It is considered a blaxploitation film. It was produced by American International Pictures.

It stars the Filipino actors Chiquito, Vic Diaz, and Eddie Garcia.

== Plot ==
James Iglehart portrays Cal Jefferson, an African-American prizefighter, who is on his honeymoon in Hong Kong with his new wife, played by Shirley Washington. During their time there, he encounters a drowning Chinese man whom he jumps into the sea to save. This now-revived and very grateful mute man turns out to be someone they cannot seem to shake off. Although they believe they have finally gotten rid of him, it appears otherwise.

As they make a purchase in Hong Kong, the item becomes the center of attention for a gang led by Kenneth Metcalfe, who will stop at nothing to retrieve it. Faced with this danger, they decide to leave Hong Kong for Manila in the Philippines. However, their troubles continue as they find themselves under attack, with the mute Chinese man once again coming to their assistance.

== Cast ==
- James Iglehart as Cal Jefferson
- Shirley Washington as Arlene Jefferson
- Chiquito as Charley
- Eddie Garcia as Ambrose
- Ken Metcalfe as Leonardo King
- Marissa Delgado as Pandora
- Vic Diaz as Hotel Clerk
- Joe Zucchero as Ivan Soroka
- Michael Boyet as Gunman
- Steve Alcarado
- Subas Herrero
- Leo Martinez
- Benny Pestano
- Boy Picate
- Robert Picate
- Robert Rivera
- Tony Uy
- Bonnie Kay Eddie

== See also ==
- List of American films of 1974
