= Trina Parks =

American actress, vocalist, choreographer, dancer

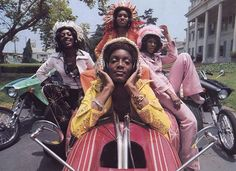
- Born: Trina Frazier; 26 December 1946 (age 79); Brooklyn, New York, U.S.
- Occupations: Actress, vocalist, dancer, choreographer
- Known for: First African–American Bond Girl, Diamonds Are Forever (1971)

Trina Parks (born Trina Frazier; December 26, 1946) is an American actress, vocalist, choreographer, principal dancer and dance instructor. Parks is best known for portraying Thumper in the 1971 James Bond film Diamonds Are Forever.

== Movies ==
Year	Film	Roles
1970	Beyond the Valley of the Dolls	
1970	The Great White Hope	
1971	Diamonds Are Forever	Thumper
1975	Darktown Strutters	Syreena
1976	The Muthers	Marcie
1980	The Blues Brothers	Dancer in church
2012	Immortal Kiss: Queen of the Night	Amina
2020	111 the Force	Joy Morris

== Television ==
- Night Gallery, episode "The Phantom Farmhouse"
- McCoy - NBC Movie of the Week
- Liv and Maddie, episode "Dodge-A-Rooney"
- Dick Shawn Special - Featured singer/dancer - CBS
- The Hollywood Palace (2 shows) - Featured singer/dancer - NBC
- French composer Michel Legrand Special - Featured dancer - Paris TV
- Dionne Warwick Special - Featured dancer - CBS
- Telly Savalas Special - Featured dancer - CBS
- Parks also appeared in television specials with Dean Martin and Sammy Davis Jr.
- Parks appeared in To Tell the Truth as herself

== Theater ==
- The Selling of the President
- Her First Roman
- The Emperor Jones - Principal - NY & European Tour, with James Earl Jones
- The Great White Hope with James Earl Jones
- Bittersweet - Principal - Long Beach C.L. Opera, with Shirley Jones
- More Than You Deserve - Principal - NY Shakespeare Festival, with Fred Gwynne
- They're Playing Our Song - Principal - Grand Dinner Theatre, with Joanne Worley
- House of Flowers '92 - Principal - East Coast Tour, with Patti LaBelle
- In Dahomey - New Federal Theatre at the Harry De Jur Playhouse, New York
- Sophisticated Ladies - Starring - US Tour
- National Tai Pai Theatre - Guest Soloist - European Concert
- Changes - Principal - Theatre de Lys
- Ovid's Metamorphoses - Principal - Mark Taper Forum, Los Angeles
- Catch a Rising Star
- Bread, Beans and Things - Co-Star - Aquarius Theatre, Los Angeles
- Black Ballet Jazz - Guest Artist - European Tour
- Black Diamonds - Guest Artist - John Houston Theatre
- I Don't Want to Cry No More
- Deux Anges Sont Venus - Guest Artist - Théâtre de Paris
- Sights and Sounds at Carnegie Hall
- Eleo Pomare Dance Company - Guest Artist
- Tribute to Sammy Davis Jr. - New York
- Trina's Tribute to Duke Ellington - One-Person Show
- The Fabulous Palm Springs Follies - 6 years

== Choreography ==
- Clytemnestra & Agamemnon
- Rumba Trio - Lulu Washington Dance Company
- Golden Globe Awards
- Car Wash movie tour
- "Tribute to the Black Woman" concert
- Carousel
