= Chase (1973 TV series) =

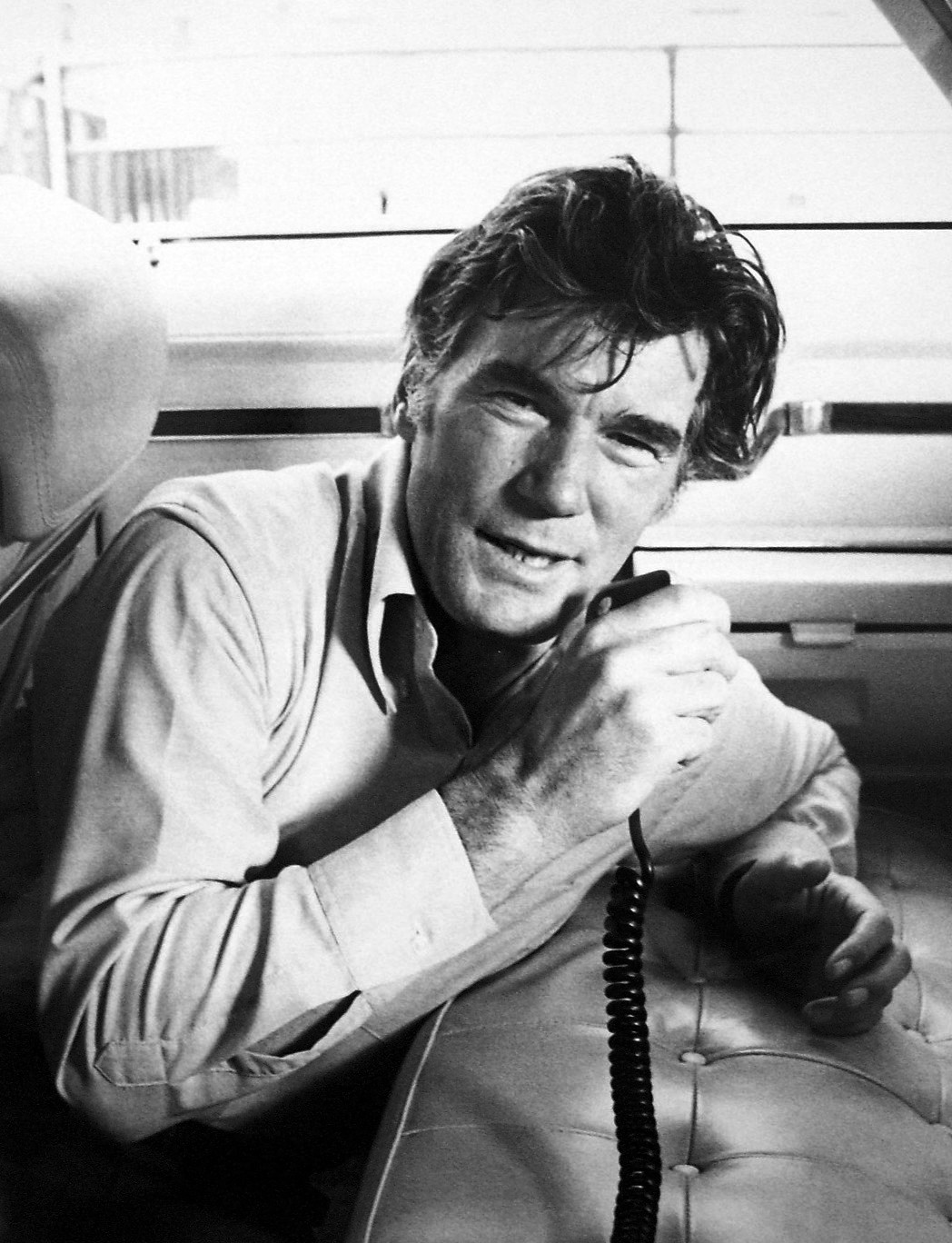
- Mitchell Ryan as Chase Reddick, undercover from a car's back seat
- Genre: Drama
- Created by: Stephen J. Cannell; Robert A. Cinader
- Starring: Mitchell Ryan; Michael Richardson; Wayne Maunder; Reid Smith
- Composer: Oliver Nelson
- Country of origin: United States
- Original language: English
- No. of seasons: 1
- No. of episodes: 23

Production
- Running time: 60 minutes
- Production companies: Mark VII Limited; Universal Television

Original release
- Network: NBC
- Release: September 11, 1973 – April 10, 1974

Chase is an American crime drama television series that aired on the NBC network from September 11, 1973, to April 10, 1974. The show was a production of Jack Webb's Mark VII Limited for Universal Television and marked the first show created by Stephen J. Cannell, who later became known for creating and/or producing his own programs, including NBC's The A-Team. Jack Webb directed the pilot, which aired March 24, 1973.

== Overview ==
The show's title had a double meaning: it was at once the first name of the lead character, Chase Reddick (Mitchell Ryan), the leader of a special team of the Los Angeles Police Department that specialized in solving unusually difficult or violent cases, and indicative of the show's emphasis on the determined pursuit and undercover surveillance of hardened criminals. The unit, headquartered in an old firehouse, relied mainly on alternate/undercover means of transportation such as helicopters, motorcycles, custom vans, taxis, four-wheel-drive vehicles, sports and muscle cars, work trucks (vehicles from the Public Works Department, the telephone company, tow trucks and/or the Postal Service and civilian delivery services) and high-speed driving to apprehend its suspects.

For the first fourteen episodes, Reddick, an LAPD captain, was accompanied by K-9 Sergeant Sam MacCray (Wayne Maunder) and three young officers: Steve Baker (Michael Richardson), Norm Hamilton (Reid Smith), and Fred Sing (Brian Fong). In January 1974, Webb and Universal dropped all the regulars except Ryan and Maunder in favor of a new group of officers: Frank Dawson (Albert Reed), Ed Rice (Gary Crosby, who frequently appeared on the other Mark VII shows), and Tom Wilson (Craig Gardner). Never seen, but "appearing" in every episode was actual LAPD dispatcher Shaaron Claridge, who had worked on Dragnet and Adam-12; according to the pilot script, she was assigned especially to Chase.

NBC first scheduled the show on Tuesdays at 8 p.m. Eastern, opposite CBS' hit series Maude and Hawaii Five-O. At about the same time as the casting change, the network moved Chase to Wednesday nights at 8 p.m. against The Sonny & Cher Comedy Hour. Despite the declining appeal and ratings of the latter (and the couple's forthcoming divorce), Chase did no better there and ended after a one-season run. Cannell would re-use the format of a team of specialists in The A-Team, co-created with Frank Lupo a decade later. Robert A. Cinader, who also supervised Mark VII's Adam-12 and Emergency!, was executive producer of Chase.

== Cast ==
- Mitchell Ryan as Capt. Chase Reddick
- Wayne Maunder as Sgt. Sam MacCray
- Michael Richardson as Off. Steve Baker (episodes 1as14)
- Brian Fong as Off. Fred Sing (episodes 1as14)
- Reid Smith as Off. Norm Hamilton (episodes 1as14)
- Craig Gardner as Tom Wilson
- Albert Reed as Frank Dawson
- Gary Crosby as Ed Rice
- Shaaron Claridge

== Episodes ==
No.	Title	Directed by	Written by	Original release date
1	"Pilot"	Jack Webb	Stephen J. Cannell	March 24, 1973
2	"The Wooden Horse Caper"	David Friedkin	Michael Donovan	September 11, 1973
3	"Gang War"	Christian I. Nyby II	Michael Donovan	September 18, 1973
4	"Foul-Up"	George Fenady	William Kayden	September 25, 1973
5	"The Winning Ticket"	Alan Crosland Jr.	James Schmerer	October 2, 1973
6	"One for You, Two for Me"	Christian Nyby	Lou Shaw	October 9, 1973
7	"The Scene Stealers"	Georg Fenady	Michael Donovan	October 23, 1973
8	"Six for Five"	Arthur H. Nadel	Arthur Rowe	October 30, 1973
9	"The Dealer-Wheelers"	Christian Nyby	Jerry Thomas	November 6, 1973
10	"The Dice Rolled Dead"	Unknown	Unknown	November 20, 1973
11	"The Garbage Man"	Arthur H. Nadel	Michael Donovan	November 27, 1973
12	"A Bit of Class"	Christian I. Nyby II	Story by : R.A. Cinader; Teleplay by : Carey Wilber	December 11, 1973
13	"Sizzling Stones"	William Wiard	Joseph Polizzi	December 18, 1973
14	"Right to an Attorney"	Alan Crosland Jr.	James Basler	January 8, 1974
15	"John Doe Bucks"	Alan Crosland Jr.	Unknown	January 16, 1974
16	"$35 Will Fly You to the Moon"	Georg Fenady	William Kayden	January 23, 1974
17	"The Game Ball"	George Fenady	Michael Donovan	January 30, 1974
18	"Vacation for a President"	Arthur H. Nadel	William Driskill	February 6, 1974
19	"Hot Beef"	Alan Crosland Jr.	Lou Shaw	February 13, 1974
20	"Out of Gas"	Unknown	Unknown	February 20, 1974
21	"Remote Control"	Arthur H. Nadel	Carey Wilber	February 27, 1974
22	"Eighty-Six Proof TNT"	Georg Fenady	Jerry Thomas	March 20, 1974
23	"The People Parlay"	Alan Crosland Jr.	Joseph Polizzi	April 10, 1974

== Sources ==
- Total Television: A Comprehensive Guide to Programming from 1948 to the Present, Alex McNeil, New York: Penguin, revised ed., 1984. ISBN 0-140-15736-0
