= Tom Ligon =

American actor (1940–2026)

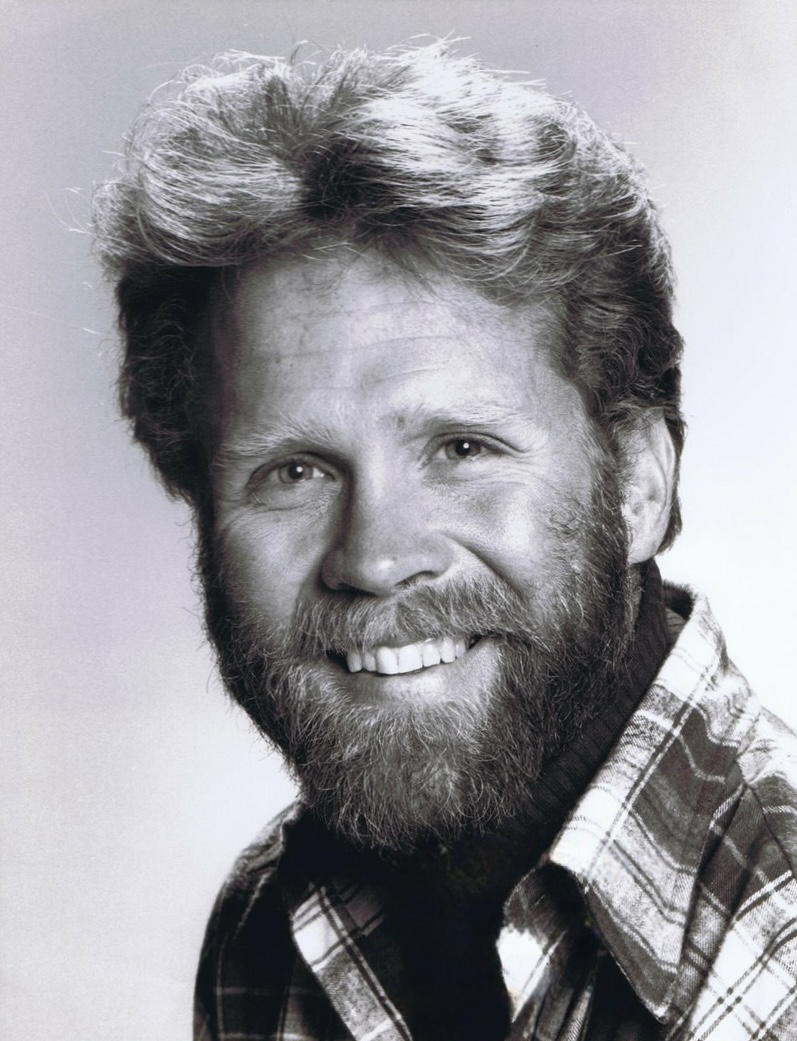
- Ligon in The Young and the Restless, 1978
- Born: Thomas Bryant Ligon; September 10, 1940; New Orleans, Louisiana, U.S.
- Died: June 26, 2026 (aged 85); New York City, U.S.
- Occupation: Actor
- Years active: 1960–2026
- Spouse: Katharine Dunfee Clarke (1976–2009; her death)

Thomas Bryant Ligon (September 10, 1940 – June 26, 2026) was an American actor. He appeared in the films Paint Your Wagon, Jump, and Bang the Drum Slowly (in which he also sang the title song) as well as the television series The Young and the Restless, and Oz.

== Life and career ==
Thomas Bryant Ligon was born in New Orleans, Louisiana September 10, 1940, and was of Cajun ancestry. Mentored by folksinger and actor Gordon Heath in Paris, beginning in the mid 1950s, Ligon then attended St. Albans School (Washington, D.C.), where he suffered a broken leg while playing football, and, sans sports, his interests turned solidly toward theater. At Yale, where he was a member of Skull and Bones and graduated as an English major (1962), he was discovered by Tennessee Williams, who saw his performance as Kilroy in Williams' play, Camino Real at the Yale Dramatic Association. Ligon became one of the most sought after young actors in New York in the 1960s.

Ligon appeared on many prominent regional stages in the United States, notably the Arena Stage where he played the title role in Billy Budd and in Hard Travelin' by Millard Lampell in 1964, and Actors Theatre of Louisville, where he played Hank Czerniak, the polka king, in Evelyn and the Polka King.

He married Katharine Dunfee Clarke (1948–2009) on December 31, 1976.

Ligon created the role of Orson in the prize-winning Off-Broadway musical Your Own Thing (1968), and starred on Broadway opposite Geraldine Page in Angela, by Sumner Arthur Long, and with Sandy Duncan in John Patrick's Love is a Time of Day. This work on stage led to his appearing in two films, Paint Your Wagon and Bang the Drum Slowly. Concerning Ligon's third film, Jump (1971): Quentin Tarantino called it "this amazing film that no one’s ever seen – I’ve only seen it once and I’d love to see it again – this really good Seventies backtrack exploitation movie... It’s hilarious and very satirical. I remember really liking that."

He played the Tiger in Rajiv Joseph's Bengal Tiger at the Baghdad Zoo in its original iteration, directed by Giovanna Sardelli at the Lark Play Development Center in New York City. Other noteworthy appearances by Ligon on the New York stage include Geniuses, BAFO (Best and Final Offer), Den of Thieves, The Golf Ball, Tartuffe: Born Again, A Backer's Audition, Another Paradise, and Have I Got A Girl for You.

In 2000, Ligon appeared in a critically acclaimed New York production of Our Town, directed by Jack Cummings III, where he played George Gibbs. Also, for Transport Group, he subsequently played in Requiem For William, All the Way Home, and The Audience, all directed by Jack Cummings III.

In August 2013, when Ligon was aged 72, The New York Times reported that he sent an intruder tumbling to the pavement below with a fist to the forehead and a ninja shout after the man had entered his Greenwich Village apartment through a window. Responding to later news that it was a "career burglar" he had chased away, and who was now in jail, Ligon told The Times: "Well, I guess he's not having much of a 'career' right now. It's like acting – you’ve got your ups and downs."

Ligon served many years as SAG-AFTRA's Chair of its National Seniors Committee. He also served as a member of the Board of Directors of the New York Screen Actors Guild (2005–07).

Ligon died in New York City on June 26, 2026, at the age of 85.

== Filmography ==
=== Film ===
- Nothing But a Man (1964) – Teenager #1
- Paint Your Wagon (1969) – Horton Fenty
- Jump (1971) – Chester Jump
- The Last American Hero (1973) – Lamar
- Bang the Drum Slowly (1973) – Piney Woods
- Joyride (1977) – Sanders
- Young Doctors in Love (1982) – Soap Cameos
- Cutting Class (1989) – Mr. Ingalls
- I Believe in America (2007) – Oliver
- Serial (2007) – Chief Joseph Spataford
- Lost Revolution (2007) – Oliver
- Front Cover (2015) – Gus LaMar

=== Television ===
- Hawk (1966)
- The 39th Witness (TV film) (1968)
- The Jackie Gleason Show "Operation Protest" (1970)
- A World Apart (original cast, 1970–1971)
- Medical Center (1971)
- The Execution of Private Slovik (TV film) (1974)
- F. Scott Fitzgerald in Hollywood (TV film (1975)
- The Black Box Murders (TV film) (1975)
- Judge Horton and the Scottsboro Boys (TV film) (1976)
- The Adams Chronicles (1976)
- Baretta (1977)
- Rosetti and Ryan (1977)
- Charlie's Angels (1977)
- Police Woman (1977)
- Starsky and Hutch (1977)
- The Young and the Restless (1978–1982)
- Baa Baa Black Sheep (1978)
- Loving (original cast, 1983–1984)
- The Demon Murder Case (TV film) (1983)
- Santa Barbara (1987)
- Dallas (1987)
- The American Experience – "Simple Justice" (TV Film) (1993)
- All My Children (1989)
- Another World (1990, 1995)
- Oz (2001–2003)
- Law & Order: Special Victims Unit (2001)
- Law & Order (1995–2003)
- Law & Order: Criminal Intent (2007)
- The Heart, She Holler (original cast, 2011–2013)
