= James Monroe Iglehart =

American actor and singer (born 1974)

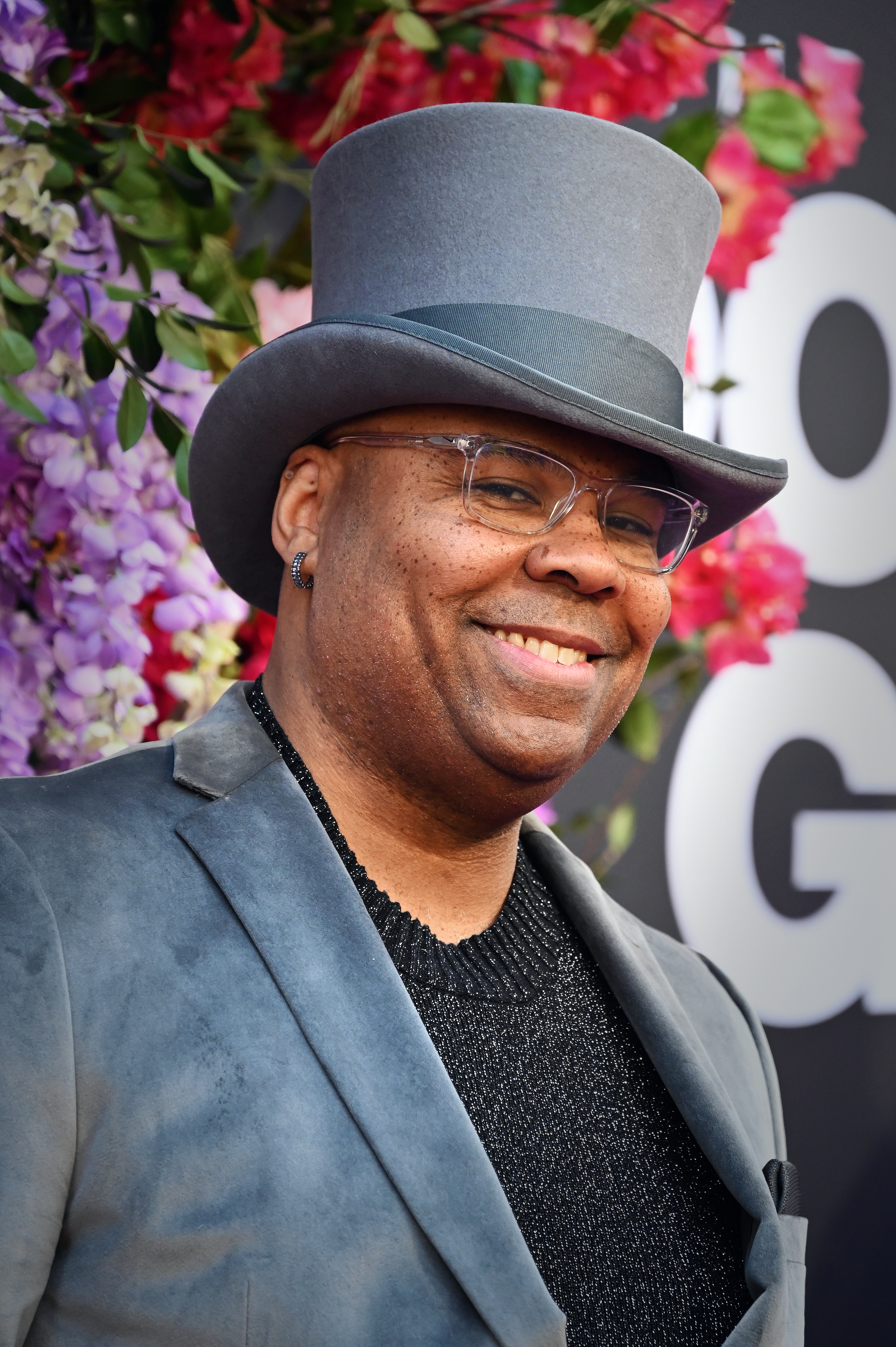
- Iglehart in 2025
- Born: September 4, 1974 (age 52); Hayward, California, U.S.
- Education: Cal State Hayward (BA)
- Occupations: Actor; singer; comic book writer
- Years active: 1978–present
- Known for: Aladdin, Hamilton
- Spouse: Dawn Phelps (m. 2002)
- Parent: James Iglehart

James Monroe Iglehart (born September 4, 1974) is an American actor, singer and comic book writer. He is perhaps best known for his Tony Award-winning performance as the Genie in the original Broadway production of Aladdin. Iglehart assumed the roles of the Marquis de Lafayette and Thomas Jefferson in the Broadway cast of Hamilton in April 2017. His additional Broadway credits include recreating the role of King Arthur in the 2023 revival of Spamalot, creating the role of Louis Armstrong in the original company of A Wonderful World, and playing Billy Flynn in Chicago and Lance in & Juliet. He can be heard as super producer Steve Jones in As The Curtain Rises, Broadway's first original podcast soap opera. More recently, Iglehart joined the casts of animated musical web series Helluva Boss (as Asmodeus and Vortex) and Hazbin Hotel (as Zestial), as well as having written professionally for Marvel Comics, primarily one-shots featuring Spider-Man.

== Early life ==
James Monroe Iglehart was born in Hayward, California on September 4, 1974.

== Career ==
Iglehart attended Cal State Hayward, graduating with a Bachelor of Arts degree in theatre. He started his career in California, performing in Bat Boy at TheatreWorks in Palo Alto and as Teen Angel in Grease at the American Musical Theatre in San Jose.

Iglehart at Animate! Philadelphia in 2026

In 2005, he directed Bat Boy: The Musical at Ray of Light Theatre. He has played Mitch Mahoney in The 25th Annual Putnam County Spelling Bee on Broadway as a replacement starting in April 2007. He originated the role of Bobby in Memphis on Broadway in October 2009.

Iglehart performed the role of the Genie in Aladdin on Broadway, a performance for which he won the 2014 Tony Award for Best Featured Actor in a Musical and the Drama Desk Award for Outstanding Featured Actor in a Musical for this role. When asked about the role, he said, "It's not as exhausting as you think. I'm kind of an energetic guy in general, so basically I'm kind of being me with the volume turned up." Iglehart departed the company of Aladdin in February 2017 to begin rehearsals in the role of Marquis de Lafayette/Thomas Jefferson in the Broadway company of Hamilton. He also performed in Freestyle Love Supreme on Broadway.

Iglehart guest starred in four episodes of Unbreakable Kimmy Schmidt as Coriolanus Burt, the rival of male protagonist Titus Andromedon.

Iglehart voices Mr Puppypaws in SuperKitties, Vortex and Asmodeus in Helluva Boss, Zestial Morde in Hazbin Hotel, Lance Strongbow in Rapunzel's Tangled Adventure, Captain James Hook in Cheshire Crossing by Andy Weir, Bronzino in Elena of Avalor, Oscar in Vampirina and Taurus Bulba in DuckTales.

In January 2022, Iglehart took over the role of Billy Flynn in Chicago. In May 2023 he starred as King Arthur in Spamalot at the Kennedy Center. In November of that year the show transferred to Broadway where he reprised his role.

In October 2023, Iglehart assumed the lead role of A Wonderful World, a new musical based on the life of Louis Armstrong, in its pre-Broadway New Orleans and Chicago engagements. He also recurs in the TV series SuperKitties voicing Mr. Puppypaws.

In February 2024, it was announced the show would be transferring to Broadway with Iglehart in the lead role. He also served as a co-director of the production. Igleheart received a Tony nomination for his portrayal of Armstrong.

In 2026, Iglehart became the new voice of Pupsicle in RoboGobo season two where the character was previously voiced by Taye Diggs in season one.

== Personal life ==
He was raised in Hayward, California, with his brother. His mother is a former high school choir teacher. His father James Iglehart is a former minor league baseball player and actor. He met his wife Dawn Phelps in the Mt. Eden High School show choir and they married in 2002.

== Filmography ==
=== Film ===
Year(s)	Title	Role	Notes
1978	Death Force	Jimmy Russell	Infant role
2011	We Are the Hartmans	Eustace	
2015	Broadway Draft 2015	Anchor	Short film
2016	Landed	TSA Agent	Short film
2016	Tom and Jerry: Back to Oz	Calvin Carney, Jitterbug	Voice
2017	Three Christs	Benny	
2022	Disenchanted	Weary Businessman	Cameo appearance
2023	Wish	John	Voice, uncredited
2027	Hidden Heroes: A Descendants Story	Genie	

=== Television ===
Year(s)	Title	Role	Notes
2010	The Good Wife	Geo	Episode: "Doubt"
2012	Great Performances	Bobby	Episode: "Memphis"
2012	Submissions Only	Wilson Jones	Episode: "Woof!"
2012	Smash	Assistant	Episode: "Hell on Earth"
2015	Gotham	Ringmaster	Episode: "The Blind Fortune Teller"
2015–2019	Unbreakable Kimmy Schmidt	Coriolanus Burt	4 episodes
2016–2018	Nature Cat	Michael Bluejáy	Voice, 4 episodes
2017	Law & Order: Special Victims Unit	Shawn Tompkins	Episode: "Intent"
2017–2020	Rapunzel's Tangled Adventure	Lance Strongbow	Voice, 38 episodes
2018	Cady Did	Orrin Hackett	
2018	Elementary	Detective Mason	Episode: "Pushing Buttons"
2018	Maniac	Carl	Miniseries, 8 episodes
2018–2019	Our Cartoon President	Vocalist	Voice, 12 episodes
2019	At Home with Amy Sedaris	Darius Von Hassock	Episode: "Makeover"
2019	Anthem: Homunculus	Ronnie Castro	Episode: "The End of Love"
2019, 2024–present	Hazbin Hotel	Bar Patron, Zestial	Voice, 5 episodes
2020	Perfect Harmony	Keith	Episode: "Regionals"
2020	Elena of Avalor	Bronzino	Voice, 2 episodes
2020	The Disney Family Singalong	Himself	Television special
2020	Vampirina	Oscar	Voice, episode: "Bust Friends"
2020	DuckTales	Taurus Bulba	Voice, episode: "Let's Get Dangerous!"
2020	Biggest Little Christmas Showdown	Himself	Host
2021	Solos	Technician	Episode: "Jenny"
2021–present	Helluva Boss	Vortex/Asmodeus	Voice, 7 episodes
2022	The Not-Too-Late Show with Elmo: Game Edition	Himself	Episode: "Isaiah Russell-Bailey & James Monroe Iglehart"
2022	The Marvelous Mrs. Maisel	Charlie	3 episodes
2022	Girls5eva	Nathan Reasel	Episode: "Album Mode"
2022	Santiago of the Seas	Martín/Chief/Engineer	Voice, 2 episodes
2022	Alice's Wonderland Bakery	Oliver	Voice, episode: "A Special Blend"
2022	Bubble Guppies	Cy the Cyclops	Voice, episode: "Bubble Medics to the Rescue!"
2022	Blue's Clues & You!	Jack O' Lantern	Voice, episode: "The Legend of the Jack O' Lantern"
2022, 2024–2025	Firebuds	Captain Kapow	Voice, 3 episodes
2023	Alma's Way	James King	Voice, 3 episodes
2023–2024	Not Quite Narwhal	Chief Jinglehooves	Voice, 12 episodes
2023–present	SuperKitties	Mr. Puppypaws	Voice, 39 episodes
2023–present	Kiff	Martin Chatterley	Voice, 30 episodes
2025	Krapopolis	Hector	Voice, episode: "One Eye One Heart She's Stupe"
2026	RoboGobo	Pupsicle	Voice, 7 episodes
2026	Sofia the First: Royal Magic	Lord Primrose	Voice, recurring role
2026	Last Week Tonight with John Oliver	Opera Viking	Episode: "Structured Settlements"

=== Video games ===
Year(s)	Title	Role	Notes
2003	Virtua Cop 3	Chief Inspector	
2003	Silent Line: Armored Core	Additional voices	

== Stage credits ==
Year(s)	Production	Role	Location	Category	Notes
1998	Show Boat	Ensemble	-	US Tour	
2002	Joseph and the Amazing Technicolor Dreamcoat	Simeon	San Jose Center for the Performing Arts	Regional	
2002	Big River	Jim	Willows Theatre Company	Regional	
2003	Ragtime	Coalhouse Walker Jr.	Diablo Light Opera Company	Regional	
2003	A Little Night Music	Mr. Lindquist	TheatreWorksUSA	Regional	
2004	Children of Eden	Father	Willows Theatre Company	Regional	
2004	Ragtime	Coalhouse Walker Jr.	Foothill Music Theatre	Regional	
2005	Sweeney Todd: The Demon Barber of Fleet Street	Sweeney Todd	Foothill Music Theatre	Regional	
2005-2006	Into the Woods	The Wolf	TheatreWorksUSA	Regional	
2006	The 25th Annual Putnam County Spelling Bee	Mitch Mahoney	Wilbur Theatre	Regional	
2007–2008	The 25th Annual Putnam County Spelling Bee	Mitch Mahoney	Circle in the Square Theatre	Broadway	
2009	The Wiz	The Lion	New York City Center	Off-Broadway	Encores!
2009–2011	Memphis	Bobby	Shubert Theatre	Broadway	
2011	Aladdin	The Genie	5th Avenue Theatre	Regional	
2013–2014	Aladdin	The Genie	Ed Mirvish Theatre	Regional	
2014–2017	Aladdin	The Genie	New Amsterdam Theatre	Broadway	
2017–2019	Hamilton	Marquis de Lafayette / Thomas Jefferson	Richard Rodgers Theatre	Broadway	
2019	Hercules	Phil	Delacorte Theater	Central Park	
2019-2020	Hamilton	Marquis de Lafayette / Thomas Jefferson	Richard Rodgers Theatre	Broadway	
2020	The Nightmare Before Christmas	Oogie Boogie	-	Virtual concert	
2021	Hamilton	Marquis de Lafayette / Thomas Jefferson	Richard Rodgers Theatre	Broadway	
2022	Chicago	Billy Flynn	Ambassador Theatre	Broadway	
2022	Guys and Dolls	Nathan Detroit	Kennedy Center	Regional	
2023	Hercules	Phil	Paper Mill Playhouse	Regional	
2023	Spamalot	King Arthur	Kennedy Center	Regional	
2023	A Wonderful World	Louis Armstrong	Saenger Theatre	Regional	
2023	A Wonderful World	Louis Armstrong	Cadillac Palace Theatre	Regional	
2023	Gutenberg! The Musical!	The Producer	James Earl Jones Theatre	Broadway	One night only cameo
2023-2024	Spamalot	King Arthur	St. James Theatre	Broadway	
2024	Aladdin	The Genie	New Amsterdam Theatre	Broadway	Cameo for anniversary performance
2024-2025	A Wonderful World	Louis Armstrong	Studio 54	Broadway	Co-Director
2025–2027	& Juliet	Lance Du Bois	Stephen Sondheim Theatre	Broadway	

== Awards and nominations ==
Year	Award	Category	Work	Result
2014	Tony Awards	Best Featured Actor in a Musical	Aladdin	Won
2014	Drama Desk Awards	Outstanding Featured Actor in a Musical	Aladdin	Won
2015	Grammy Awards	Best Musical Theater Album	Aladdin	Nominated
2023	Children's and Family Emmy Awards	Outstanding Voice Performance in a Preschool Animated Program	SuperKitties	Nominated
2025	Tony Awards	Best Actor in a Musical	A Wonderful World	Nominated
