= Lada St. Edmund =

American actress

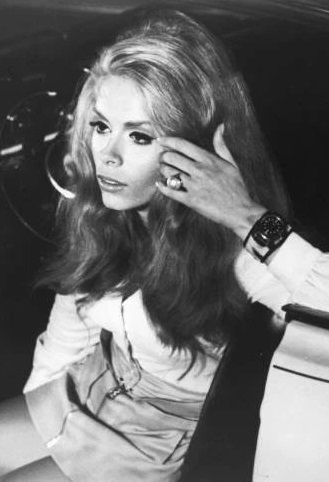
- St. Edmund in 1969
- Born: April 1, 1947 (age 79)
- Occupations: Actress; Dancer; personal trainer; singer; stunt performer

Lada St. Edmund (also known as Lada Edmund, Jr.) (born April 1, 1947) is an American personal trainer, dancer, singer, actress and stunt performer. St. Edmund became a popular nationally known go-go dancer on the 1965–1966 NBC-TV rock music series Hullabaloo. She later became the highest paid stuntwoman in Hollywood history.

== Personal life ==
When St. Edmund was a child, she lived with her grandmother on a farm in Minneapolis, Minnesota. The farmhands watched boxing on television, which sparked St. Edmund's interest in boxing as an adult. She was a tomboy. She moved to Manhattan with her mother, at the age of nine. She attended ballet classes and at the age of 12 performed in her first Broadway musical.

St. Edmund married in the late 1970s and moved to Upper Saddle River, New Jersey. She gave birth to a daughter, named Skye. She is divorced and lives in Wayne, New Jersey.

== Career ==
=== A young start on Broadway ===
St. Edmund's theater debut was in the first production of Bye Bye Birdie on Broadway, playing Penelope Ann at the age of 12. Her stage name was Lada Edmund, Jr. She performed in West Side Story, also on Broadway, when she was fifteen, and also performed in Promises, Promises.

=== Hullabaloo and go-go dancing ===
At seventeen, St. Edmund became a go-go dancer on Hullabaloo. While working on the show, she met Mick Jagger and the Rolling Stones. During her time at Hullabaloo, she was on The Tonight Show Starring Johnny Carson. She received fan letters, including many from students at Harvard. Donna McKechnie described St. Edmund as having a "Brigitte Bardot look". She was featured on the cover of TV Guide in June 1965.

=== Singing career ===
St. Edmund signed a deal with Decca Records in 1966. Her first single was "I Know Something", which was released in 1966. The single, with the b-side "Once Upon a Time", made the Billboard Pop 100. It was described as being similar to Nancy Sinatra's "These Boots Are Made for Walkin'". She performed on the ABC-TV variety program The Hollywood Palace on October 22, 1966.

=== Move to Hollywood ===
After Hullabaloo ended, St. Edmund moved to Hollywood. She starred in the films The Devil's 8 (1969), Out of It (1969), Jump (1971), Savage! (1973) and Act of Vengeance (1974). She also appeared on the short lived ABC-TV anthology series ABC Stage 67. She struggled to get serious roles in the film industry, often being seen only as a dancer.

==== Stuntwork ====
As she struggled to find roles, she met Hal Needham through Dinah Shore. After her meeting with Needham, and with the encouragement of Burt Reynolds, she studied to be a stunt performer. St. Edmund went on to do stuntwork in Smokey and the Bandit. In 1975, St. Edmund drove a 1972 Mercury to test airbags for Eaton Corporation. She drove the car into a wall going 50 miles per hour (80 km/h). She was paid $25,000 by Allstate and broke her ankles. She performed a motorcycle jump over cars on a television pilot for Evel Knievel, and suffered a compression fracture. She was scheduled to do stuntwork in The Cannonball Run. She was unable to perform one day and the woman who was her stand-in ended up being paralyzed during a scene. St. Edmund's stunt work eventually made her the highest paid stuntwoman in Hollywood history.

=== Physical fitness and sports ===
St. Edmund got involved in personal training in the late 1980s. In the early 2000s, St. Edmund started boxing. She boxed for about six months before stopping. She became a personal trainer. In 2010, she started training to become a boxing referee. She met, and then trained under Mike Rosario. As a personal trainer, she has a youth training program called Modern Miracles.
