= The Seven Minutes (film) =

1971 film by Russ Meyer

- Theatrical release poster
- Directed by: Russ Meyer
- Screenplay by: Richard Warren Lewis; Uncredited: Manny Diez
- Based on: The Seven Minutes by Irving Wallace
- Produced by: Russ Meyer
- Starring: Wayne Maunder; Marianne McAndrew; Philip Carey; Edy Williams; Yvonne De Carlo
- Cinematography: Fred Mandl
- Edited by: Dick Wormell
- Music by: Stu Phillips
- Production company: 20th Century Fox
- Distributed by: 20th Century Fox
- Release date: July 23, 1971
- Running time: 115 minutes
- Country: United States
- Language: English
- Budget: $2.415 million

The Seven Minutes is a 1971 American legal drama film directed and produced by Russ Meyer. The movie was based on the 1969 novel of the same name by Irving Wallace.

== Plot ==
After a teenager, Jerry Griffith (John Sarno), who purchased the erotic novel The Seven Minutes is charged with rape, an eager prosecutor who is against pornography (and preparing for an upcoming election) uses the scandal to declare the book as obscene, sets up a sting operation where two detectives enter a bookstore and purchase a copy of the eponymous book, then the prosecutor brings charges against the bookstore for selling obscene material. The trial soon creates a heated debate about the issue of pornography vs. free speech. The young defense lawyer, Mike Barrett, must also solve the mystery of the novel's true author.

In examining the history of the book, the defense attorney discovered it was written by J.J. Jadway, an American expatriate living in Europe. The book was originally published in English by a publisher in France, and eventually picked up by various tawdry publishing companies in the United States, most of whom tried to emphasize the more lurid and salacious aspects of the book. Its content was considered so sexually explicit that it was banned as obscene in over 30 countries. Apparently. J.J. Jadway was so despondent over the treatment of his book that he committed suicide; one of his friends found him and reported it.

As the trial takes place, the prosecutor finds ordinary members of the public who find the book grossly offensive (one of whom admits on cross-examination by the defense that she cannot even repeat out loud one of the words used in the book to describe what the female protagonist was doing in bed with her lover), and the defense finds professionals in academia and the media who attest to the book's value as literature. The prosecution then puts the young man who committed the rape on the stand to say the book drove him to it.

The attorney defending the book is contacted by Constance Cumberland, a member of a local decency society who decides to testify in court about the young man who committed the rape and other things surrounding the book. She had spoken with the young man, and his motivation for the rape was not the book, but his own fears over his sexuality.

Constance also admits that she knew J.J. Jadway, the book's author, that he did not die of a heart attack in Europe in the 1950s as was reported, and that she knew that the book's content was not intended to be pornographic but rather an examination of a woman's sexuality.

When she is asked how she could know this, Constance responds with a bombshell, "Because I am J.J. Jadway, and I wrote The Seven Minutes." She had asked a friend to publicize the fake suicide of J.J. Jadway in order to discourage investigation into the book's author because, more than 20 years ago, it would have been bad for her if it were discovered she was the author, but she should not hide any longer. She proceeds to explain that the man with whom the female protagonist of the novel was having sex, as the book showed, had had problems with impotence, and had become able to experience intercourse because of her. Her feeling of what this man reawakened in her, having not taken a lover for many years, makes her realize she wants to be with him – all of this occurring inside her head during her experience of the seven minutes of intercourse.

The jury finds the book not obscene. The prosecutor says that decision only applies in that part of the state, and he can try again somewhere else in California. The attorney who won the case chastises him, pointing out that it is ridiculous to try to restrict what adults choose to read in their homes when no harm has been shown (as it was in this case, since the book was simply a scapegoat used to explain away the case of alleged rape by the young man.)

A note at the end of the movie states that for a woman during a session of lovemaking, the average length of time from initial arousal to orgasm is about seven minutes.

== Cast ==
- Wayne Maunder as Mike Barrett
- Marianne McAndrew as Maggie Russell
- Philip Carey as Elmo Duncan
- Jay C. Flippen as Luther Yerkes
- Edy Williams as Faye Osborn
- Lyle Bettger as Frank Griffith
- Yvonne De Carlo as Constance Cumberland
- Jackie Gayle as Norman Quandt
- Ron Randell as Merle Reid
- Charles Drake as Sergeant Kellogg
- John Carradine as Sean O'Flanagan
- Harold J. Stone as Judge Upshaw
- James Iglehart as Clay Rutherford
- Tom Selleck as Phil Sanford
- Olan Soule as Harvey Underwood
- John Sarno as Jerry Griffith
- Jan Shutan as Anna Lou White
- David Brian as Cardinal McManus
- Charles Napier as Iverson
- Wolfman Jack as himself
- Lynn Hamilton as Avis
- Edith Evanson as Mrs. Merrick

== Production ==
=== Development ===
In 1965, 20th Century Fox bought the rights to three novels by Irving Wallace for $1.5 million. The first of these was The Plot. The second was The Seven Minutes, which he finished in 1968.

In June 1969, Fox announced it would make the movie in the next 18 months. It would be produced and directed by Richard Fleischer.

The book came out in October 1969 and became a best seller. The New York Times called it "impossible to put down."

=== Russ Meyer ===
Fleischer withdrew, and the movie was assigned to Russ Meyer, who had directed Beyond the Valley of the Dolls for Fox. Fox was happy with the movie and signed a contract with Meyer to make three more movies: The Seven Minutes, from a novel by Irving Wallace; Everything in the Garden from a play by Edward Albee; and The Final Steal from a 1966 novel by Peter George. "We've discovered that he's very talented and cost conscious", said Fox president Richard Zanuck. "He can put his finger on the commercial ingredients of a film and do it exceedingly well. We feel he can do more than undress people."

Meyer later said of his time at Fox, "I made the mistake of acquiring a big fat head while I was there. I was flush with victory from Vixen, Cherry, Harry and Raquel, and BVD. They told me, "You must do The Seven Minutes. You are the spokesperson against the forces of censorship." And Irving Wallace sits there with this profound look. They gave me $2.7 million for the film, but no tits and ass... I had another property I should have done instead. But Brown gave me the blue smoke up my ass. So I did it."

"Russ is trying to do something different for him", said Wallace. "As far as I can tell it will not be a skinflick and at least for most of it the movie will follow the line of my novel."

=== Casting ===
"We're casting it much like an English movie", said Meyer. "We're really paying attention to the vignettes."

As with many of his movies, Meyer used several actors from his previous productions, including then-wife Edy Williams, Charles Napier, Henry Rowland and James Iglehart. Established actress Yvonne De Carlo makes an appearance along with veteran character actor Olan Soule. Tom Selleck also had a role in the movie, and DJ Wolfman Jack made a cameo.

Known as "King of the Nudies" for his work in the sexploitation film genre, Meyer planned nude scenes in this mainstream film. He informed female lead candidates that nudity would be integral to their roles, and after casting interviews, considered Marianne McAndrew to be suitable. He subsequently signed her for the lead role of Maggie Russell. McAndrew, previously known for her work as the prim and proper Irene Molloy in Hello, Dolly!, accepted the role based upon her wish to change her own image and in order to gain more work within the industry. She reported that during the filming, Meyer was "considerate and gentlemanly".

Ron Randell had a small role.

=== Shooting ===
Wallace requested Meyer use Picassos from his personal collection in the movie.

Filming started 14 October 1970.

Meyer said it was "a very wordy picture" so he used rapid cutting.

While the movie was being made Richard Zanuck was fired as head of production and was replaced by Elmo Williams. Williams said Seven Minutes was "going to be a very interesting film. I was worried after the first cut but Russ handled the sex extremely well. When I saw the first half I was going to ask him to slow the picture down. And it's rare for me to ask a guy to slow a picture down. I mean, so people could understand the story better. But when I saw the whole film with the second half – the trial – I understood what he was doing...I've never seen a good trial in a film – a trial that isn't slow, isn't boring."

== Soundtrack ==
The music was composed by Stu Phillips.

The soundtrack contains three songs written by Stu Phillips (composer) and Bob Stone (lyricist): "Love Train" sung by Don Reed, "The Seven Minutes" performed by B.B. King and "Midnight Tricks" sung by Neil Merryweather and Lynn Carey.

== Reception ==
Meyer later said "The first night in every theater was packed. And the next night: three people. Why? The audience knows...It was a good film. But attaching my name to that film was a bummer. It does a great disservice to everyone concerned."

The Seven Minutes received a lukewarm reception from critics and was a rare commercial failure for Meyer.

Meyer later said, "I made the mistake of reading my reviews. What the public wants are big laughs and big tits and lots of ‘em. Lucky for me that's what I like, too."

"It was boring and tedious", he said in 1975. "I should never have taken it on. Message pictures are never successful. This one had too much courtroom and not enough he-ing and she-ing."

Roger Ebert later said the movie "was unsuited to Meyer's strongest points, which are eroticism, action and parody in about equal doses. The Seven Minutes was intended as a serious consideration of pornography and censorship and, alas, that is the way Meyer approached it. He got serious about the theme. He had been harassed for years by various amateur and professional vigilantes, and intended The Seven Minutes as his statement against censorship. The result, whatever it was, was not a Russ Meyer film in the classical vein."

Ebert admitted there were some nice touches like making a U.S. Senator from California a woman played by Yvonne De Carlo "but Meyer's main thrust seemed to be to bring The Seven Minutes to the screen more or less faithfully and seriously, and I think that was a mistake. The courtroom scenes and philosophical discussions clashed with the melodrama (as they also do in the Irving Wallace novel), and the result was a film of a project that should probably not have been made at all, and certainly not by Russ Meyer."

=== Critical ===
The New York Times' reviewer Roger Greenspun wrote "I don't think that a court of law is the right Russ Meyer arena, and The Seven Minutes, which had started out pretty well, bogs down hopelessly in its courtroom legalisms and its absolutely non-cliff-hanging rush to unearth the real identity of the mythical J.J. Jadway", citing some problems with the movie's complicated plot and "enormous cast of characters". In addressing the movie's use of nudity, he wrote "[Meyer] has never been so much concerned with undressing his girls (there are maybe five seconds of nudity in "The Seven Minutes") as admiring their appetites, their overwhelming proportions (but not so much their seductive flesh), their often destructive and self-destructive wills."

Variety wrote that Irving Wallace's original novel was a "potboiler", "which averted the essence of the problem in resolving the story", and noted that Russ Meyer was a "censor-exploited as well as a censor-exploiting filmmaker", who began with a story handicap and added a few of his own. They expanded that Meyer used "cardboard-caricatures of his heavies" which obscured issues, and included the "regular time-out for the sexually-liberated dalliances which have been his stock in trade."

Writing for FilmInk, Stephen Vagg declared, "I think I'm the only person in the world who likes The Seven Minutes – I find it an entertaining, fast paced courtroom drama which deals with interesting issues, which is well directed and acted."

== See also ==
- List of American films of 1971
