= Wayne Maunder =

Canadian-born American actor

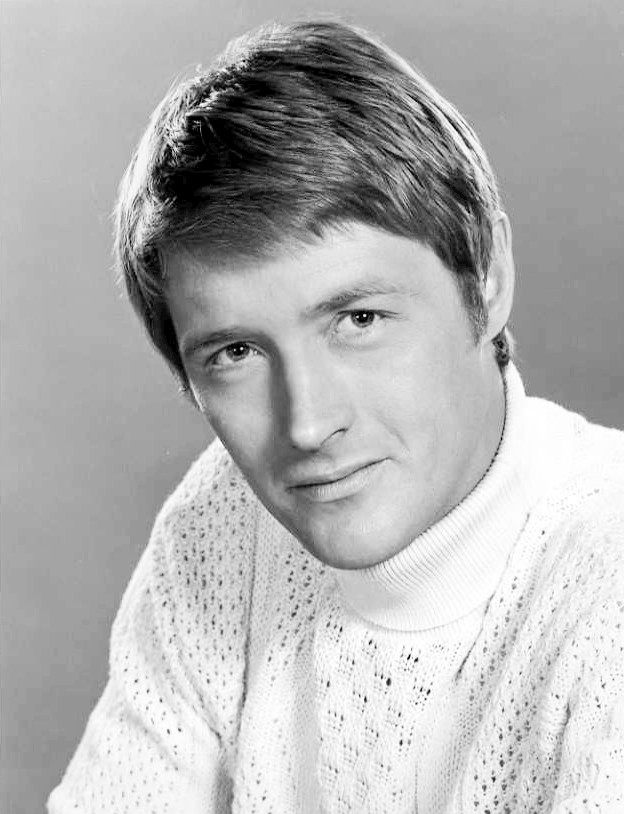
- Maunder in 1968
- Born: Wayne Ernest Maunder; December 19, 1937; Four Falls, New Brunswick, Canada
- Died: November 11, 2018 (aged 80); Brattleboro, Vermont, U.S.
- Occupations: Actor: Custer, Lancer, Chase
- Years active: 1967–1982
- Spouse: Lucia Maisto Maunder (m. 1967)
- Children: 1

Wayne Ernest Maunder (December 19, 1937 – November 11, 2018) was a Canadian-born American actor who starred in three American television series between 1967 and 1974.

== Three television series ==
From September 6 to December 27, 1967, Maunder starred as 28-year-old George Armstrong Custer in the series Custer set during the time that Custer was stationed in the American West.

Maunder's next series was Lancer, with co-stars Andrew Duggan, James Stacy, and Paul Brinegar. Lancer ran from 1968 to 1970, with an additional rebroadcast cycle in Summer 1971.

Maunder's last regular series, Chase, is a 23-episode drama about an undercover police unit which aired on NBC during the 1973–1974 television season, co-starring Mitchell Ryan as Chase Reddick and Reid Smith as officer Norm Hamilton. Maunder played the role of police Sergeant Sam MacCray, one of whose duties was to handle the police dog named "Fuzz". A Jack Webb production, Chase was created by Stephen J. Cannell.

== Early years and actor's training ==
Maunder was born in Four Falls in the Canadian province of New Brunswick, but was reared, along with four siblings, in Bangor, Maine, where his family moved when he was four years old and which he considered to be his hometown. His mother was Lydia Maunder (1913–1980).

Maunder graduated in 1957 from Bangor High School, where he played football and baseball.

He studied English literature plus drama at El Camino College Compton Center, then known as Compton Junior College in Compton, California. He participated in an amateur play and began a career in acting.

Maunder made his first screen appearance on February 4, 1967, as Michael Duquesne in "Race for a Rainbow", an episode of The Monroes, starring Michael Anderson, Jr., and Barbara Hershey. Maunder was credited as "James Wilder" on The Monroes, but decided thereafter to return to his own name.

== As Custer ==
Maunder returned to Los Angeles, where he secured his first screen role under his real name, as George Armstrong Custer in the 20th Century Fox production Custer. He grew a moustache to accompany his long blond hair for the part. The short-lived series, which took over The Monroes' time slot, was defeated in the ratings by The Virginian and Lost in Space on CBS and dropped from the ABC schedule by the end of 1967 after only 17 episodes.

== As Scott Lancer ==
The fictitious Scott Lancer was born in California but reared in Boston, Massachusetts by his maternal grandfather Harlan Garrett. A Civil War veteran, Scott was a lieutenant in the cavalry under General Philip Sheridan. He spent time in a Confederate States of America prisoner of war camp. He attended Harvard University and was once engaged to a girl named Julie Dennison.

In contrast to Scott, Johnny Lancer, Scott's half brother played by James Stacy, was born to a Mexican woman, had been a gunslinger under the name Johnny Madrid for several years, and then attempted to settle on the family's Lancer ranch.

As the educated older son of Andrew Duggan's patriarchal figure of Murdoch Lancer, Maunder wore short hair and removed the moustache from his Custer role.

== Other acting appearances ==
After Custer and Lancer, Maunder appeared on three ABC series: the pilot episode of Kung Fu series with David Carradine, twice on The F.B.I. with Efrem Zimbalist, Jr., as Knox Hiller in "Time Bomb" (1970) and as Earl Gainey in "The Fatal Showdown" (1972), and as Don Pierce in the episode "Crossfire" of The Rookies (1973).

Maunder had the lead role as attorney Mike Barrett in the 1971 film The Seven Minutes, directed by Russ Meyer.

After Chase, Maunder appeared in five additional guest-starring roles: Detective Fred Webber in Police Story, a two-episode program, "Year of the Dragon" (1975), a creation of Joseph Wambaugh; as Paul, a jewel thief, in The Streets of San Francisco with Karl Malden, episode "Web of Lies" (1975); in Kate McShane with Anne Meara, episode "God at $15,732 a Year" (1975); as Deputy Burt Campbell in Barnaby Jones episode "Copy-Cat Killing" (1977), and as Cavanaugh in the movie Porky's (1982).

Year	Title	Role	Notes
1971	The Seven Minutes	Mike Barrett	
1982	Porky's	Cavanaugh	(final film role)

== Personal life ==
Maunder resided in the Greater Los Angeles Area. In 1967, he married Lucia Maisto. The couple's son, Dylan T. Maunder, was born the next year in 1968.

== Death ==
Maunder died unexpectedly on November 11, 2018, aged 80. He was noted as having a history of heart disease.

== Fictional portrayals ==
In August 2018, Luke Perry (who died four months after Maunder) was cast to portray Maunder in Quentin Tarantino's Once Upon a Time in Hollywood. Perry ended up playing a character named "Scott Lancer".
