= Blind Rage (film) =

1978 film

- Film poster
- Directed by: Efren C. Piñon
- Written by: Leo Fong; Efren C. Piñon; Jerry O. Tirazona
- Produced by: Leo Fong; Leoncio Imperial
- Starring: D'Urville Martin; Leo Fong; Tony Ferrer; Dick Adair; Darnell Garcia; Charlie Davao; Leila Hermosa; Fred Williamson
- Cinematography: Ben Lobo
- Edited by: Edgardo Vinarao
- Music by: Tito Sotto
- Release date: April 1, 1978 (United States)
- Running time: 81 minutes
- Language: English

Blind Rage is a 1978 comedy-themed blaxploitation martial arts film. It was directed by Efren C. Piñon and starring Fred Williamson, Tony Ferrer, Leo Fong, and D'Urville Martin. Although he receives top billing, Fred Williamson's part in the film is only in the climax, reprising his Jesse Crowder role from the 1976 films Death Journey and No Way Back. The plot is about five blind martial artists pulling off a bank robbery in Manila.

== Plot ==
The United States government is transferring $15 million to a bank in Manila owned by Johnny Duran. In America, Duran is approached by a man named Simpson and accepts a bribe to cooperate with Simpson's plan to steal the money. Simpson reveals that the plan involves recruiting a team of blind men to perform the robbery. Duran meets each gang member and also recruits Sally, a teacher of blind people.

In Manila, Sally recruits another blind man; local ex-criminal Ben Guevara. The gang learn the layout of the bank in a mock-up and train with weapons. On the day of the robbery, the gang enter the bank while Sally waits nearby feigning an engine problem with her van. Trained to shoot at any unusual sounds, the gang shoot several people including guards, employees and customers. Ben is interrupted by bank guards before he can disconnect the alarm, but in an ensuing fight the system is accidentally disconnected. The gang steal the money and make their escape.

The police discover Ben's cane at the bank and later pick him up for questioning. Ben cooperates and leads them to the place where they trained. The other gang members, hidden in a secret compartment inside a fuel tanker, leave just before the police arrive and head to the airport. The secret compartment begins to fill with gasoline leaking from the tanker, which then crashes and explodes while the driver is trying to evade the police.

In Los Angeles, Jesse Crowder is hired to find Duran and follows him to a meeting with Simpson. When police move in, Duran escapes and Crowder chases him to a rooftop, where the two fight. Crowder wins and takes the unconscious Duran to the waiting police.

== Production and release ==
The film was released in the United States in April 1978 before receiving a Betamax and VHS release my MGM/UA Home Video in 1984. and a Blu-ray release in 2020 with a restored print.

== Cast ==
- Fred Williamson as Jesse Crowder
- Tony Ferrer as Ben Guevara
- Leila Hermosa as Sally
- D'Urville Martin as Willie Black
- Dick Adair as Anderson
- Darnell Garcia as Hector Lopez
- Leo Fong as Lin Wang
- Charlie Davao as Johnny Duran
- Nathan Jung as Henchman
