= Don Julian (musician) =

American R&B, funk and soul singer, guitarist and songwriter (1937–1998)

- Also known as: The Meadowlarks; The Larks
- Born: Donald Ray Julian; April 7, 1937
- Origin: Los Angeles, California, U.S.
- Died: November 6, 1998 (aged 61)
- Genres: R&B; funk; soul
- Years active: 1950s–1998

Don Julian (April 7, 1937 – November 6, 1998) was an American rhythm and blues, funk and soul singer, guitarist and songwriter. Most famous for his work as an R&B singer in the 1950s and 1960s, he was also known for composing the soundtrack and songs to the blaxploitation film, Savage!.

== Career ==
Born Donald Ray Julian in Houston, Texas, United States, in his teens he moved to Los Angeles, California, where he began performing with local bands.

He performed both solo and with backing bands. His most famous backing group was "The Meadowlarks" (later named The Larks), although most of his film music was performed with instrumental funk bands. The Meadowlarks is considered the first integrated doo-wop group. In 1954, Don Julian and the Meadowlarks' debut single "Heaven and Paradise", became popular with R&B fans. In 1964, the single, "The Jerk" was released under the band name, The Larks. The single, released on the Money label, was Julian's only chart hit. It went to number one on both the Billboard R&B chart and the Cash Box R&B chart and peaked at number seven on the Billboard Hot 100 chart.

Julian recorded several solo albums for a variety of record labels in the 1970s.

Julian died on November 6, 1998, from pneumonia, aged 61.

== Discography ==
=== Solo (incomplete) ===
- Savage! (1973) (soundtrack to the film Savage!)

=== With the Meadowlarks or the Larks ===
- Heaven and Paradise (1955)
- The Jerk (1964)
- Shorty the Pimp (1973) (soundtrack to limited release film starring the band)
- Golden Classics (1990)

== Influence ==
A song from the album Savage! titled "Janitizo" was sampled by Warren G, on his song "And Ya Don't Stop" on his debut album, Regulate...G Funk Era. The title track "Shorty the Pimp" was sampled by Too Short as the intro track for his 1992 album Shorty the Pimp.
