= Shirley Washington =

American actress

- Years active: 1970s–1980s

Shirley Washington is a television and film actress who appeared in television shows from 1970. She appeared in two episodes of Mission: Impossible playing a Stewardess in the 1970 TV episode Flight and as a Travel Agent in the 1972 TV episode The Puppet and as Maggie in a Wonder Woman TV episode, "Chinese Puzzle". In the mid 1970s. she starred in some Blaxploitation films as Mrs Jefferson in Bamboo Gods and Iron Men 1974, T.N.T. Jackson in 1975, as Theda in Darktown Strutters 1975, and in Disco 9000 in 1976.

== Television ==
- The Redd Foxx Show - "The Old and the Restless" (1986) TV episode - Gina
- Melvin and Howard (1980) - Patient Debbie
- Police Woman - "The Inside Connection" (1977) TV episode - Bessie
- Sanford And Son - "Aunt Esther Meets Her Son" (1976) TV episode - Salesgirl
- Wonder Woman - "Women of Transplant Island" (1973) TV episode - Maggie
- Mission: Impossible - "The Puppet" (1972) TV episode - Girl Travel Agent
- Mission: Impossible - "Flight" (1970) TV episode - Stewardess

== Film ==
- 1977 Get Down And Boogie
- 1976 Disco 9000 as Receptionist
- 1975 Darktown Strutters as Theda
- 1975 T.N.T. Jackson (uncredited)
- 1974 Bamboo Gods and Iron Men as Mrs. Jefferson
- 1973 Wonder Women

== Reading ==
- (Article) Black Stars"(USA) June 1975, pg. 32–35, by: Walter Jenkins, "Shirley Washington Tells How She Cracked Hollywood"
