= Charles Dierkop =

American character actor (1936–2024)

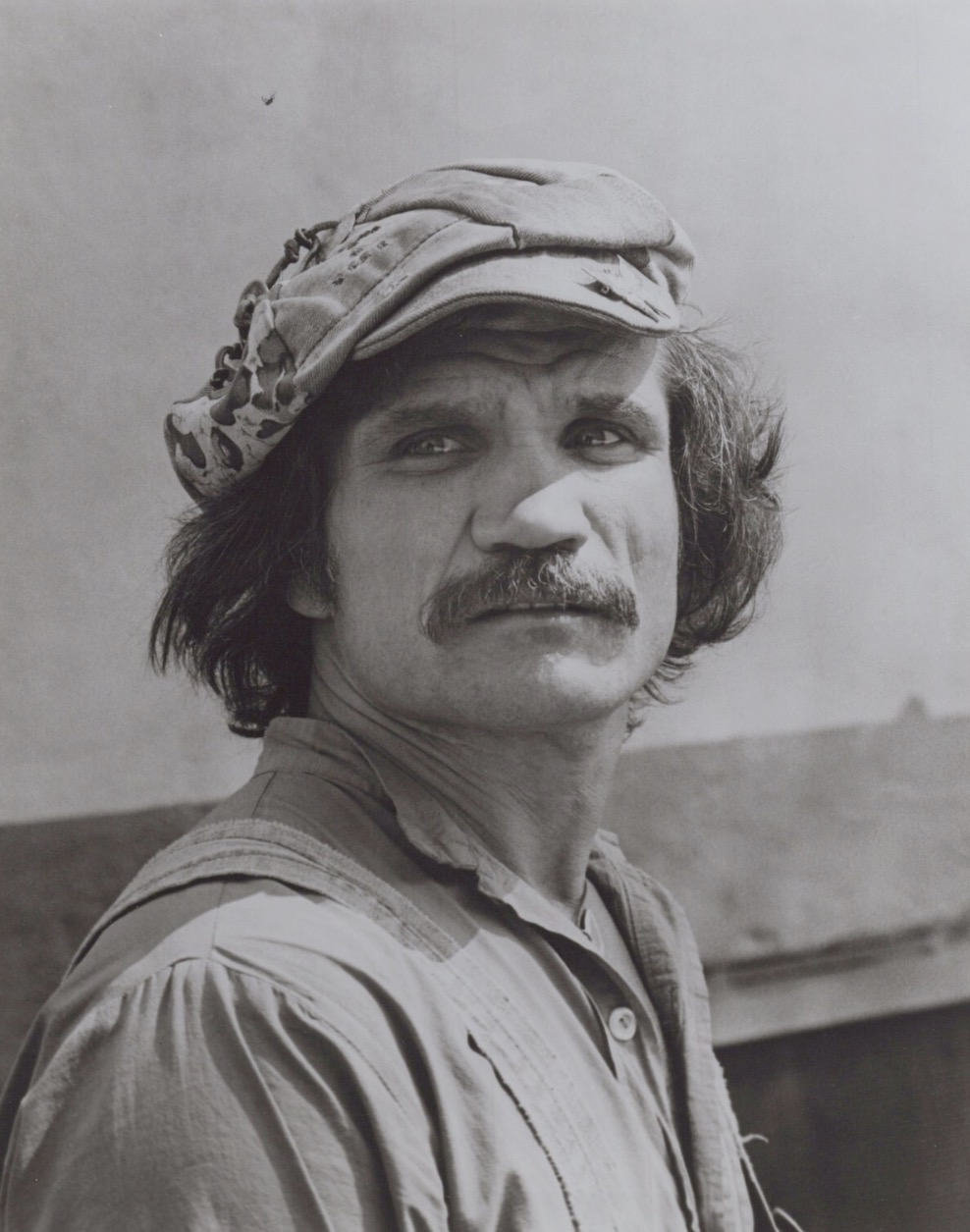
- Dierkop in Police Woman, 1976
- Born: Charles Richard Dierkop; September 11, 1936; La Crosse, Wisconsin, U.S.
- Died: February 25, 2024 (aged 87); Los Angeles, California, U.S.
- Occupation: Actor
- Years active: 1961–2016
- Spouse: Joan Addis (m. 1958; div. 1974)
- Children: 2

Charles Richard Dierkop (September 11, 1936 – February 25, 2024) was an American character actor. He is most recognized for his supporting roles in the films Butch Cassidy and the Sundance Kid (1969) and The Sting (1973) and the television series Police Woman (1974–1978).

== Early years ==
Dierkop was born in La Crosse, Wisconsin. He attended Holy Trinity Grade School and attended Aquinas High School in La Crosse. He was raised by his aunt and uncle after his father left when Dierkop was an infant and his mother "left home when he was still a tot". He broke his nose four times in fights as a youth.

== Military service ==
Dierkop dropped out of high school after his junior year and enlisted in the U.S. Marine Corps at age 17. He served in Korea during the Korean War and was discharged from the Marine Corps at age 19. Upon his return, he lived with his mother in Philadelphia, and with the help of the G.I. Bill, he enrolled in the American Foundation of Dramatic Arts in Philadelphia.

== Career ==
Dierkop was a lifetime member of the Actors Studio. His first role as a professional actor was in television's Naked City.

Dierkop was cast in two George Roy Hill films, and played an outlaw both times — as "Flat Nose Curry" in Butch Cassidy and the Sundance Kid (1969), he played a member of the Hole in the Wall Gang, and as "Floyd" in The Sting (1973), he acted as a bodyguard with Lee Paul to Robert Shaw's New York gangster/griftee, Doyle Lonnegan. He is best known for playing Detective Pete Royster on the television series Police Woman between 1974 and 1978.

Dierkop appears briefly in the music video of "Man on the Moon", a hit song by the American alternative rock band R.E.M.

== Personal life and death ==
Dierkop was married to Joan Addis from 1958 to 1974. They had a daughter, Lynn, and a son. After Dierkop mentioned wishing to meet his father in an interview with a Milwaukee newspaper, a cousin facilitated a reunion with the man who was living on Chicago's skid row when Dierkop was 39 years old.

On February 25, 2024, Dierkop died at the age of 87 from complications of pneumonia and a heart attack at Sherman Oaks Hospital in Los Angeles.

== Partial filmography ==
- 1961 – Voyage to the Bottom of the Sea as pilot of the Seaview (uncredited)
- 1961 – The Hustler as pool room hood (uncredited)
- 1964 – The Pawnbroker as Robinson
- 1967 – Gunn as Lazlo Joyce
- 1967 – The St. Valentine's Day Massacre as Salvanti
- 1968 – The Sweet Ride as Mr. Clean
- 1969 – The Thousand Plane Raid as Railla
- 1969 – Butch Cassidy and the Sundance Kid as George "Flat-Nose" Curry
- 1970 – Pound as Airdale
- 1971 – Angels Hard as They Come as General
- 1972 – Night of the Cobra Woman
- 1972 – The Hot Box as Garcia, the Journalist/Major Dubay
- 1973 – Messiah of Evil as the gas attendant
- 1973 – The Student Teachers
- 1973 – The Sting as Floyd
- 1977 – Captains Courageous as Tom Platt
- 1981 – Texas Lightning as Walt
- 1984 – Silent Night, Deadly Night as the Killer Santa
- 1985 – The Fix as Hawkeye
- 1987 – Savage Harbor as Boat Gunman
- 1987 – Code Name Zebra as "Crazy"
- 1987 – Banzai Runner as Traven
- 1988 – Grotesque as Matson
- 1988 – Messenger of Death as Orville Beecham
- 1989 – Nerds of a Feather as Ben "Biker Ben"
- 1989 – Blood Red as Cooper
- 1989 – Liberty & Bash as Mr. B
- 1990 – Eternity as the video editor
- 1991 – Under Crystal Lake as Waldo
- 1992 – Roots of Evil as Collins
- 1994 – Maverick as Riverboat Poker Player (uncredited)
- 1996 – Too Fast Too Young as businessman
- 1998 – Merchants of Venus as Carl
- 1998 – Invisible Dad as Mr. Weiderman
- 2000 – Superguy: Behind the Cape as Sam Trent
- 2001 - James Dean (TV movie) as Groundsman
- 2005 – Murder on the Yellow Brick Road as Redwood
- 2006 – Mystery Woman: Wild West Mystery (TV movie) as Zeke Foster
- 2008 – Chinaman's Chance: America's Other Slaves as Dr. Sawyer
- 2009 – Forget Me Not as Pete, the Foreman
- 2016 – The Midnighters as Louie
- 2018 - Heaven & Hell as Bank Robber Driver

== Television credits ==
- The Naked City (1960–1962) – Arrest Suspect / Boy who Gets Beaten Up / Tow Truck Driver / Shag's Friend / Hungarian in Rail Yard / Hood / Registered Mail Clerk / Hood #1 (uncredited)
- Voyage to the Bottom of the Sea (1965) – Left-Handed Man
- Lost in Space (1965) – Horned Mutant (uncredited)
- The Man from U.N.C.L.E. (1966) – Adolph
- Gunsmoke (1966) – Dan & Silvee
- The Andy Griffith Show (1966) – Larry
- Star Trek (1967, episode: Wolf in the Fold) – Morla
- Batman (1968) – Dustbag (uncredited)
- Adam-12 (1968) – Janney
- Lancer (1968–1970) – Walters / Bleaker / Harris
- Bonanza (1969–1972) – Shorty / Nicholson / Sawyer
- The High Chaparral (1970) – Slim
- Land of the Giants (1970) – Arthur Kamber
- Bearcats! (1971, in episode 9, "Bitter Flats") – Pistolero
- Love, American Style (1971) – Gus (segment "Love and the Eyewitness")
- Mission: Impossible (1972) – Richie
- Alias Smith and Jones (1971–1973) – Clayton Crewes / Poker Player / Shields
- Kung Fu (1973) – Traphagen
- Mannix (1969–1973) – Frank / Makuta / John Marrish
- Gunsmoke (1973) – Barnett
- Kojak (1974) – DeLuca
- Police Story (1973–1974) – Royster / Dave Rawlins
- Cannon (1971–1974) – Eddie Main / Keegan
- Police Woman (1974–1978) – Det. Pete Royster
- Vega$ (1978) – Lenny
- The Deerslayer (1978, TV Movie) – Hurry Harry March
- CHiPs (1980) – Mouse
- Fantasy Island (1980–1982) – Vinnie Avalon / Harry 'Weasel' Forbes
- Matt Houston (1983–1984) – Viney / Choo Choo
- The Fall Guy (1983–1985) – Mack Doyle / Arden
- Simon & Simon (1986–1988) – Al Pacheco / Jerry Sappman
- MacGyver (1991) – Mo Nimitz
