= Angels Hard as They Come =

- Theatrical release poster
- Directed by: Joe Viola
- Screenplay by: Jonathan Demme; Joe Viola
- Produced by: Jonathan Demme
- Starring: Scott Glenn; Charles Dierkop; James Iglehart; Gilda Texter; Gary Busey
- Cinematography: Stephen M. Katz
- Music by: Richard Hieronymus
- Production company: New World Pictures
- Distributed by: New World Pictures
- Release date: 1971
- Country: United States
- Language: English
- Budget: $180,000 or $125,000
- Box office: $2 million

Angels Hard as They Come is a 1971 biker film directed by Joe Viola and starring Scott Glenn, Charles Dierkop, Gilda Texter, James Iglehart, and Gary Busey. It was co-written and produced by Jonathan Demme.

== Plot ==
Long John, Juicer, and Monk are members of a motorcycle gang, The Angels. When one of their drug deals is cancelled, members of another motorcycle gang, The Dragons, invite them to the ghost town of Lost Cause, where some hippies have started a commune. General, leader of the Dragons, challenges Long John to a race and loses. Long John then meets the hippie Astrid, to whom he is attracted. She says their leaders, Vicki and Henry, are unhappy with the Dragons.

That night, several drunk Dragons attempt to gang-rape Astrid. The Angels intervene, and one of the Dragons stabs Astrid to death. The Dragons blame Long John, accusing him of trying to kill General. The next day, the Dragons tie up the Angels and attempt to kill them. Long John frees Monk, who escapes. Monk runs out of gas in the desert, is chased by a racist on a dune buggy, and eventually steals a camper.

The hippies drug the Dragons' food and help Long John and Juicer escape. Monk finally reaches the home of Cloud, the drug dealer whom the Angels were to have met at the film's start. The remainder of the Angels are at Cloud's, and they follow Monk back to Lost Cause. In the morning, General ties Vicki to a pole and threatens to burn her alive if the hippies don't turn over Long John and Juicer. Henry attempts to kill General with a knife. General takes it from him and realizes the knife belongs to a fellow Dragon, Axe. General now realizes Axe tried to kill him during the rape of Astrid, and kills Axe.

The Angels finally arrive in town, kill all the Dragons, and rescue Long John and Juicer. Everyone leaves town, the bikers and hippies going their separate ways.

== Cast ==
- Scott Glenn as John "Long John"
- Charles Dierkop as General
- James Iglehart as Monk
- Gilda Texter as Astrid
- Gary Busey as Henry
- Gary Littlejohn as "Axe"
- Don Carerra as "Juicer"
- Janet Wood as Vicki
- Brendan Kelly as "Brain"

== Production ==
Jonathan Demme met Roger Corman while doing publicity on Von Richthofen and Brown. The producer was impressed by publicity material Demme had written and asked if he was interested in writing a motorcycle movie. Demme pitched the idea of a motorcycle version of Rashomon and wrote it with Joe Viola, who directed TV commercials Demme had produced. Corman said Demma and Viola wrote a first draft in eight weeks. They gave it to Corman at a bar the next time the producer was in London. Corman read it there and then and inivted them to Los Angeles in two months to make the movie with Viola to direct and Demme to produce. Apparently Corman also he said "Love the rape scene, love the murder, now let’s throw the rest of this stuff out."

Jack Fisk was the art director.

Scott Glenn recalled "You had to show up ona motorcycle because otherwise they figured that any actor would say, ‘Oh, yeah, I ride a bike,’ and they didn't want them showing up and not knowing how. I had been on motorcycles my whole life."

Glenn said actors included members of both Hells Angels and Gypsy Joker, "which was kind of interesting because those two clubs weren’t really getting along super well at the time."

== Reception ==
The film was very successful with Corman saying it earned rentals of over $700,000 and returning a profit of 46% within the first year.

Corman later said "This was an interesting film because it was a motorcycle picture with a little more philosophical theme behind it. It dealt with the nature of guilt, which is something you don't normally deal with in » that kind of film. I thought the film did a good job of it."

== See also ==
- List of American films of 1971
