= Reid Smith =

American film and television actor

- Born: Reid Bryce Smith; May 8, 1949; Burbank, California, U.S.
- Died: October 16, 2001 (aged 52); Burbank, California, U.S.
- Education: University of California
- Occupations: Film and television actor
- Years active: 1970–1994

Reid Bryce Smith (May 8, 1949 – October 16, 2001) was an American film and television actor.

Smith was born in Burbank, California, the son of June, a secretary for actress Maud Adams, and Verne Smith, a model and announcer. He had three sisters. When Smith was five, his father left and he had to work to help support his family, appearing in his first television advertisement at the age of six. He attended Notre Dame High School and the University of California, where he earned a bachelor's degree, later returning to study for a degree in business. While at university he restored and traded cars.

Smith made his film debut in 1970, appearing in the film Blood Mania. In 1973 Smith was a regular cast member of the NBC crime drama television series Chase, playing the role of Officer Norm Hamilton. After the series ended in 1974 he guest-starred in television programs including Columbo, Mork & Mindy, The Six Million Dollar Man, Riptide, The Dukes of Hazzard, Knots Landing, Remington Steele, Dynasty and Bonanza. In 1980 Smith co-starred in the CBS western miniseries The Chisholms, playing Lester Hackett. He also appeared in films such as the 1985 film Into the Night and the 1994 film The Killing Jar, which was his final credit.
