= Joe Viola =

American film director (1938–2024)

Joseph Andrew Viola (May 27, 1938 – October 16, 2024) was an American film director, screenwriter, and producer.

== Life and career ==
Viola was born in The Bronx on May 27, 1938. He is known for his work with Jonathan Demme, with whom he collaborated on Angels Hard as They Come (1971), The Hot Box (1972), Black Mama White Mama (1973), Stop Making Sense (1984), and Beah: A Black Woman Speaks (2003). In 1994, Demme described him as "my best friend, [and] one of the most gifted storytellers I've ever known."

Viola began his career directing television commercials, where he met Demme, who was a publicist for United Artists. In 1970, Roger Corman tasked Demme with writing an exploitation biker film for his fledgling company New World Pictures, and Demme recruited Viola as his co-writer. When Corman read their script, he asked Viola to direct, and the resulting film, Angels Hard as They Come, was a financial success for New World. As a result, Corman recruited Viola and Demme for another movie, The Hot Box. They also wrote the story for Black Mama White Mama, which John Ashley bought from Demme for $500. Demme made his directorial debut with Caged Heat in 1974, where Viola had a cameo role as a sports car driver.

In 1984, Viola served as the assistant director on Demme's concert film Stop Making Sense.

Viola wrote for television. He was a story editor for T. J. Hooker and Cagney & Lacey, and was a producer on the short-lived series Equal Justice, WIOU, Dellaventura. Other shows Viola wrote for include The Bionic Woman, One Day at a Time, MacGyver, Law & Order, and Melrose Place.

Viola wrote the segment "Manhattan Miracle" in the film Subway Stories, which was directed by Ted Demme.

Viola died in Los Angeles on October 16, 2024, at the age of 86.

== Select credits ==
- Angels Hard as They Come (1971) – director
- The Hot Box (1972) – writer, director
- Black Mama White Mama (1973) – original story
- T.J. Hooker – story editor
- Cagney and Lacey – story editor
