= Carmen Argenziano =

American actor (1943–2019)

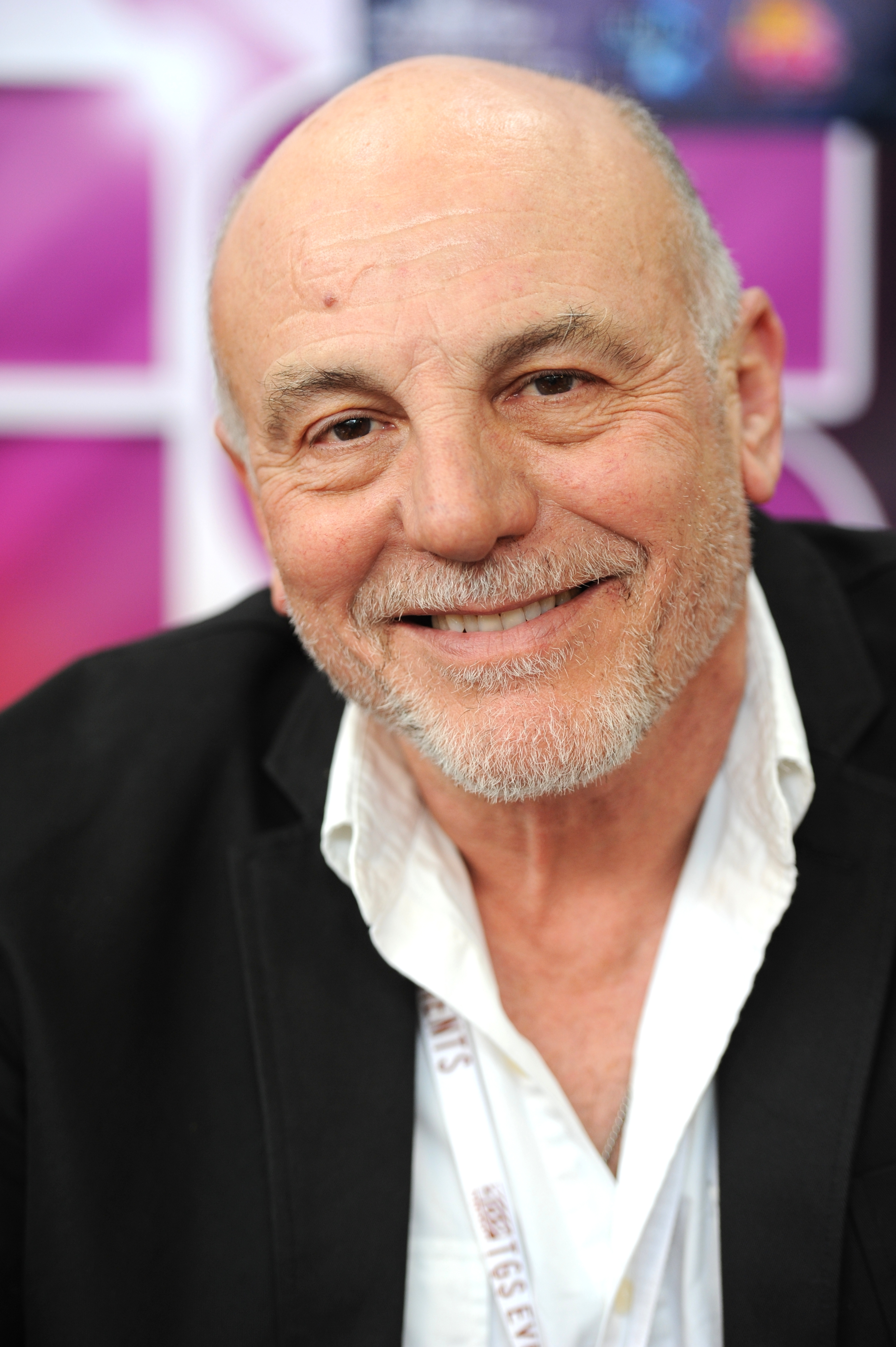
- Argenziano at SciFi Convention 2012 in Toulouse
- Born: Carmen Antimo Argenziano; October 27, 1943; Sharon, Pennsylvania, U.S.
- Died: February 10, 2019 (aged 75); Los Angeles, California, U.S.
- Occupation: Actor
- Years active: 1969–2019
- Children: 3

Carmen Antimo Argenziano (October 27, 1943 – February 10, 2019) was an American actor who appeared in over 73 movies and around 100 television movies or episodes. He was best known for playing Jacob Carter on Stargate SG-1. He had recurring roles on Booker, L.A. Law, Melrose Place, and The Young and the Restless, as well as minor roles in The Godfather Part II, Angels & Demons, and The Accused.

== Early life ==
Argenziano was born in Sharon, Pennsylvania, and raised in nearby Sharpsville, the son of parents of Italian descent, Elizabeth Stella (née Falvo) and Joseph Guy Argenziano, who was a restaurateur.

== Career ==
One of Argenziano's best-known roles was as the recurring character Jacob Carter in the television series Stargate SG-1. He was also a lifetime member of the Actors Studio and was awarded the Los Angeles Drama Critics' Circle Award for his performance as Jack Delasante in Thomas Babe's A Prayer for My Daughter. In 2007, he appeared in three episodes of House M.D. as a candidate for House's fellowship. In 2009, he guest starred in Criminal Minds episode "Demonology", where he portrayed Father Paul Silvano.

== Personal life ==
He had three children: two sons and a step-daughter.

== Death ==
Argenziano died on February 10, 2019, at the age of 75. No cause of death was disclosed.

== Filmography ==
=== Film ===
Year	Title	Role	Notes
1970	Cover Me Babe	Student #2	
1971	Punishment Park	Jay Kaufman	
1971	The Jesus Trip	Pinole	
1972	Night of the Cobra Woman	Unknown	Uncredited
1972	Rio Tigre	Unknown	
1972	The Hot Box	Flavio	
1972	Grave of the Vampire	Sam	
1972	Hit Man	Huey's White Partner	Uncredited
1972	The Outside Man	Second Hawk	
1973	The Slams	Minor Role	
1974	Caged Heat	Undercover Wrestler	
1974	The Godfather, Part II	Michael's Buttonman #2	
1975	Capone	Jack "Machine Gun Jack" McGurn	
1975	Sharks' Treasure	Lieutenant	
1975	Crazy Mama	Supermarket Manager	
1976	Vigilante Force	Brian Seldon	
1976	Two-Minute Warning	Officer Jennings	
1978	Death Force	Morelli	
1978	The Boss' Son	Ken	
1979	When a Stranger Calls	Dr. Mandrakis	
1981	Graduation Day	Halliday	
1981	Circle of Power	Tony Annese	
1983	Sudden Impact	Assistant District Attorney D'Ambrosia	
1984	Heartbreakers	Ron Bell	
1985	Into the Night	Stan	
1985	Starchaser: The Legend of Orin	Dagg Dibrimi	Voice
1985	Naked Vengeance	Detective Russo	
1986	Dangerously Close	Molly	
1987	Under Cover	Lieutenant James Leonard	
1988	Stand and Deliver	Principal Molina	
1988	Big Business	Board Member #2	
1988	Remo Williams: The Prophecy	Tony	
1988	The Accused	District Attorney Paul Rudolph	
1988	Red Scorpion	Colonel Hernando Zayas	
1990	The First Power	Lieutenant Grimes	
1992	Rompecorazones	Ron Ball	
1992	Unlawful Entry	Jerome Lurie	
1994	Rave Review	Abe Weinstein	
1994	Final Combination	Lieutenant Stein	
1994	The Burning Season	Alfredo Sezero	TV movie
1994	Don Juan DeMarco	Don Alfonzo	
1995	The Tie That Binds	Phil Hawkes	
1996	Broken Arrow	General Boone	
1998	A Murder of Crows	Judge Wiley Banning	
1999	Blue Streak	Captain Penelli	
1999	Warm Blooded Killers	Vince Morehouse	
2000	Hellraiser: Inferno	Captain	
2000	Gone in 60 Seconds	Detective Mayhew	
2000	A Better Way to Die	Carlos	
2000	The Cactus Kid	Addison	
2001	Swordfish	FBI Agent #1	
2002	Dancing at the Harvest Moon	Warren Lucas	
2003	Identity	Defense Lawyer	
2005	What's Up, Scarlet?	Mr. Maggiami	
2005	Angels with Angles	Rico	
2009	Angels & Demons	Father Silvano Bentivoglio	
2009	Street Boss	Tony	
2011	Omerta	Sal	
2011	Amber Lake	Patrick Thomas	
2013	Sunny and RayRay	Carmen	
2014	The Single Moms Club	Ollie	
2015	Don Quixote: The Ingenious Gentleman of La Mancha	Don Quixote	
2015	Sharkskin	Jakie Hooks	
2016	Mafiosa	Sebastian Lombardo	
2016	A Winter Rose	Joe	
2017	The Labyrinth	Vincent	
2017	The Institute	Apothecary	
2017	Actors Anonymous	Mr. Smithson	
2017	Empire of the Heart	Unknown	
2017	The Mad Whale	Dr. Withers	
2017	Singularity	Damien Walsh	
2018	Future World	Grandfather	
2019	Duke	Lieutenant Brannigan	
2020	The Mercenary	Reverend Father	Posthumous release

=== Television ===
Year	Title	Role	Notes
1969	Judd, for the Defense	Dave Klein	episode: "The View from the Ivy Tower"
1970	The Young Lawyers	Hank Smith	1 episode
1971	Monty Nash	Tomas / Benny	2 episodes
1973	The F.B.I.	Ligot	episode: "Night of the Long Knives"
1974	Kojak	Davey	episode: "Marker to a Dead Bookie"
1975	Columbo	Coroner Anderson	episode: "Identity Crisis"
1975	Bronk	Controller	episode: "Short Fuse"
1975	Cannon	Alex Shuller	episode: "The Wedding March"
1975	Matt Helm	Molinas	episode: "Think Murder"
1976	Once an Eagle	Adam Brand	episode: "Part 4"
1976–1979	The Rockford Files	Dumas / Orin Wilson	2 episodes
1978–1981	Lou Grant	Morton Tracy / Arnold Zinner / Anthony Leone	3 episodes
1978	The Bionic Woman	King Kusari	1 episode
1979	CHiPs	Officer Borlov	1 episode
1981–1982	The Greatest American Hero	Murphy / Nick Castle	2 episodes
1981–1982	The Phoenix	Dave / Kingston	2 episodes
1982	The New Odd Couple	Tony S.	episode: "Opening Night"
1983	T. J. Hooker	Detective Chuck Tyler	episode: "Vengeance Is Mine"
1983	Quarterback Princess	Ed Ainsworth	TV movie
1984	Buffalo Bill	Unknown	1 episode
1984	The A-Team	Colonel Sanchez	episode: "In Plane Sight"
1984	Cheers	Marvin	1 episode
1984	Hill Street Blues	Leon DeGaulle	episode: "Last Chance Salon"
1984	Scarecrow and Mrs. King	Pierce	episode: "Brunettes Are In"
1986–1992	L.A. Law	Lawyer Neil Robertson	5 episodes
1986	Cagney & Lacey	Ronelli	1 episode
1986	Between Two Women	Robert Walker	TV movie
1987	Hunter	Dr. Schneider	episode: "A Child is Born"
1989–1990	Booker	Chick Sterling	22 episodes
1989	Heartbeat	Dr. Nathan Solt	12 episodes
1991	Matlock	Tom O'Hare	2 episodes
1991	Knight Rider 2000	Russell Maddock / KIFT	TV movie
1992–1994	Melrose Place	Dr. Stanley Levin	8 episodes
1992	A Thousand Heroes	First Officer William R. Records	TV movie
1993	Crime & Punishment	Lieutenant Anthony Bartolo	3 episodes
1993	Triumph Over Disaster: The Hurricane Andrew Story	Ed Lopez	TV movie
1994–1997	Walker, Texas Ranger	George Vickers / Paco Cruz	2 episodes
1995–1996	Sisters	Captain Smiley	4 episodes
1995	Babylon 5	Urza Jaddo	1 episode
1996	Andersonville	Hopkins	TV movie
1996	L.A. Firefighters	Detective Lou Cerone	3 episodes
1996	My Son Is Innocent	Detective Carver	TV movie
1997	JAG	Colonel Matthew O'Hara	Episode: "We the People"
1998–2003	The Practice	Attorney Horace Wright / Principal Gilbert	2 episodes
1998–2005	Stargate SG-1	General Jacob Carter / Selmak	25 episodes
1998	Night Man	Mr. Corleone / Boss	episode: "Nightwoman"
2000	Party of Five	INS Agent Lawrence	episode: "Great Expectations"
2000	Level 9	Delacroix	episode: "Mail Call"
2001	Strong Medicine	Monsignor Nicholas Rinaldi	episode: "Drugstore Cowgirl"
2002	The West Wing	Leonard Wallace	episode: "Night Five"
2002	The Court	Ohio Senator Charlie Koloski	episode: "Life Sentence"
2003–2004	The District	Mr. Parras / Nancy's Father	2 episodes
2003	24	General Gratz	1 episode
2003	The Lyon's Den	Clark Honikee	episode: "Things She Said"
2004	Medical Investigation	Lieutenant Colonel Bartek	episode: "Coming Home"
2005	Blind Justice	Chief Tunney	2 episodes
2006–2008	CSI: NY	Inspector Stanton Gerrard	6 episodes
2006	CSI: Crime Scene Investigation	Sylvano Fatelli	episode: "Rashomama"
2006	Commander in Chief	Hugh Moreland	episode: "The Elephant in the Room"
2007	House M.D.	Henry Dobson	3 episodes
2008–2009	The Young and the Restless	District Attorney Dennis Ellroy	11 episodes
2009	Meteor	Commander Murphy	2 episodes
2009	Criminal Minds	Father Paul Silvano	1 episode
2010	The Mentalist	Joseph DeSouza	1 episode
2010	Lie to Me	Gus	episode: "Exposed"
2010	Castle	Mario Rivera	1 episode
2011	Death Interrupted	Saint Peter	TV movie
2013	Bunheads	Rick	episode: "You Wanna See Something?"
2014	Hawaii Five-0	Albert Bagosa	1 episode
2017	Shooter	Charles Broadwell	episode: "Don't Mess with Texas"
