= Nick Nicholson (actor) =

American actor

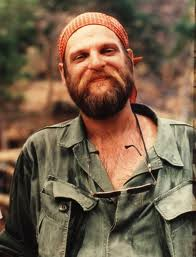
- Born: April 19, 1952; Redford, Michigan, USA
- Died: August 11, 2010 (aged 58); Quezon City, Philippines
- Other names: Nick Nichols; Nick Nickelson
- Occupation: Film actor

Daniel Patrick Nicholson, better known as Nick Nicholson, was an American expatriate character actor working in the Philippines. Since the early 1980s, Nicholson has appeared in both big-budget Hollywood productions shot in the archipelago and low-budget, Filipino action movies.

He had acted in several films by the directors Cirio H. Santiago, John Gale, and Teddy Page. He died from heart failure on August 11, 2010, in the Philippine Heart Center.

== Selected filmography ==
- Da du xiao (1975)
- Apocalypse Now (1979) - Soldier (uncredited)
- The Firebird Conspiracy (1984) - Soldier
- Heroes for Hire (1984) - Berenkov
- Slash (1984) - Randy
- American Ninja (1985) - Duty Officer
- Sangley Point Robbery (1985) - Investigator
- Deadringer (1985) - Steve
- Naked Vengeance (1985) - Sparky
- Ninja Warriors (1985) - Mike Johnson
- No Dead Heroes (1986) - Ivan, KGB officer
- The Devastator (1986) - Thug (uncredited)
- Silk (1986) - Tyler
- Platoon (1986) - Mechanized Soldier #1
- War Without End (1986) - Victor Koldunov
- Jailbreak 1958 (1986)
- Future Hunters (1986) - Shootist in Car / Nazi Soldier (uncredited)
- American Ninja 2: The Confrontation (1987) - (uncredited)
- Equalizer 2000 (1987) - Lawton's Men (uncredited)
- Dog Tags (1987)
- Action Is Not Missing (1987) - UN Aid Agent
- SFX Retaliator (1987)
- Return of the Kickfighter (1987) - Animal
- Get the Terrorists (1987) - Pierre
- Eye of the Eagle (1987) - Pfc. Crazy Dog
- Demon of Paradise (1987) - Langley
- The Sisterhood (1988) - Motivational Speaker (uncredited)
- Saigon Commandos (1988) - Airborne Sgt.
- Spyder (1988) - Bartender
- Hostage Syndrome (1988) - Barfly Drug Dealer (uncredited)
- Fast Gun (1988) - Nelson's Goon
- Death Bond (1988) - Lido
- Trident Force (1988) - Ox
- The Siege of Firebase Gloria (1989) - Photographer
- The Expendables (1989) - Marine (uncredited)
- A Case of Honor (1989) - Pops
- The Fighter (1989)
- After Death (1989) - Rod
- Blackbelt II (1989) - Bartender
- Born on the Fourth of July (1989) - Soldier (uncredited)
- The Hunted (1989) - KGB Agent
- Narco Dollar (1989) - Crazy Jack Kinney
- Dune Warriors (1990) - Tomas
- Terror in Paradise (1990) - Zev
- Fatal Mission (1990)
- Kaaway ng Batas (1990) - Club Owner
- Sudden Thunder (1990) - Disco Manager (scenes deleted)
- Blood Hands (1990) - Edward
- Blood Chase (1991) - Garage Goon
- Blood Ring (1991) - Mr. Gordon
- Angel in the Dark (1991) - Carlos
- Eternal Fist (1992) - Lucy
- Raiders of the Sun (1992) - Ackerman
- Beyond the Call of Duty (1992) - Jordan's Assistant
- Fighting Spirit (1992) - Kickboxing Trainer
- Cordora: Lulutang Ka sa Sarili Mong Dugo (1992)
- Kill Zone (1993) - Corporal / Radio Squawk
- Angelfist (1993) - Alcatraz's Friend (uncredited)
- Kyokutô kuroshakai (1993) - Baloni's Men
- Live by the Fist (1993) - Greasemonkey
- American Kickboxer 2 (1993) - Rental Manager
- Rage (1994) - Bartender (uncredited)
- One Man Army (1994) - Field Owner
- Ultimatum (1994) - Terrorist (uncredited)
- La casa del piacere (1994) - Lord Sutton / Husband
- Stranglehold (1994) - Terrorist (uncredited)
- Hong tian mi ling (1994) - Giant Frank
- Angel of Destruction (1994) - Mercenary
- Raw Target (1995) - Clive
- Sana Maulit Muli (1995) - Consul
- Lei ting xing dong (1995)
- Sobra sobra, labis labis (1996) - Mr. Blackwell
- Anak ng bulkan (1997) - Ted Ralston
- Birds of Passage (2001) - Crazy Cook (final film role)
