= Future Hunters =

1986 film by Cirio H. Santiago

- Directed by: Cirio H. Santiago
- Written by: J. Lee Thompson; Anthony Maharaj (story)
- Produced by: Cirio H. Santiago; Anthony Maharaj
- Starring: Robert Patrick; Linda Carol; Ed Crick; Richard Norton; Bob Schott; Bruce Le
- Cinematography: Ricardo Remias
- Edited by: Gervacio Santos
- Music by: Ron Jones
- Production company: Lightning Pictures
- Distributed by: Vestron Pictures
- Release date: 1986
- Running time: 100 minutes (US Laserdisc and DVD), 95 minutes (UK)
- Countries: United States; Philippines
- Language: English

Future Hunters is a 1986 action adventure film directed by Cirio H. Santiago and written by J. Lee Thompson. It stars Robert Patrick and Linda Carol with a cameo appearance of Richard Norton and Bruce Lee impersonator Bruce Le.

== Plot ==
In a post-apocalyptic world, the leader of a rebel group (Richard Norton) fights a warlord to retrieve the mystical Spear of Destiny from a derelict temple. The spear's powers enable him to travel back in time. 39 years earlier, he saves the aspiring anthropologist Michelle (Linda Carol) and her boyfriend Slade (Robert Patrick) from the attack of a ruthless biker gang who injure him fatally. Before his demise, he hands the spear over to the couple and implores them to find the shaft in order to unite it with the spear to break its dark powers.

The search for the shaft takes Michelle and Slade from Los Angeles to Hong Kong and through the jungles of the Philippines until they reach the legendary Venus Valley. They must fight goons, martial artists, fanatical Nazis, Mongol warriors, midgets and hostile Amazons until they reach the cave where the shaft is located.

== Production ==
=== Development ===
After the international success of Final Mission (1984) and Naked Vengeance (1985), Vestron Pictures executive Austin O. Furst Jr. approached the producer/director duo Cirio H. Santiago and Anthony Maharaj to do another film for them as a negative pickup deal. Maharaj came across a one-pager about the Spear of Destiny, the lance that is alleged to have pierced the side of Jesus as he hung on the cross during his crucifixion and is considered a magical relic of historical significance. Inspired by the popularity of Raiders of the Lost Ark (1981) and The Temple of Doom (1984), Maharaj built a story around the search for this object. Veteran British screenwriter/director J. Lee Thompson was hired to write a script based on this idea and turned it into a wild mix of genres and locations.

=== Pre-production ===
The movie went into production in 1986 with the working title Spear Of Destiny.

=== Filming ===
Principal photography took place on a 12 hours per day, six days a week shooting schedule. Actress Linda Carol described the working conditions as strenuous. She reported having suffered a heat stroke during shooting.

Most of the picture was filmed on location in the Philippines, namely in Metro Manila, the sand dunes near Suba Beach at Laoag, Ilocos Norte, Baguio, at the Calinawan Cave in Tanay, Rizal, and the Manila Garden Hotel amongst other places. Some exteriors were shot in Hong Kong.

=== Music ===
After the successful collaboration on Naked Vengeance (1985), composer Ron Jones was once again commissioned to create the soundtrack for this film. Jones created an epic soundtrack dominated by fanfares, which is reminiscent of his later score for Star Trek: The Next Generation (1987-1991).

== Release ==
Future Hunters was released directly to video by Vestron Pictures. Its video premiere was on September 23, 1988 in the United Kingdom and on February 26, 1989 in the United States. It was released on LaserDisc in 1989 by Image Entertainment

== Reception ==
=== Critical response ===
Variety called the movie a "winner" that "emerges from the rash of lookalike adventure features on video" and "unfolds as a virtual homage to the high adventure motifs of George Lucas yet moves beyond mere imitation into its own successful territory". It criticized Robert Patrick's performance as "merely okay" and noted that "more upscale casting might have earned this laudable little film some theatrical attention".

VideoHound's Golden Movie Retriever gave the Future Hunters a one-bone rating (on a scale from zero to four bones).

Creature Features: The Science Fiction, Fantasy, and Horror Movie Guide awarded Future Hunters two stars and described the movie as an "Indiana Jones-type fantasy adventure" that is "energetic and swiftly paced".

The Psychotronic Video Guide's verdict was less favorable: "It's a bad mixture of Mad Max, Indiana Jones, and many others".

Douglas Pratt from The Laser Disc Newsletter praised the movie in his contemporary review for being "ambitious" and featuring "a lot of action". "It moves in location from the future to the present and from California to Hong Kong to uncharted jungles in the Philippines". He criticized technical aspects of the film, especially the sound recording for often being "pathetic", as well as logical errors such as the heroine jumping from an airplane on a parachute and running through the jungle brush in high heels.

Daniel R. Budnik wrote in his review in 80s Action Movies on the Cheap: "Future Hunters stakes its claim to being one of Santiago's most ambitious with the century-spanning plotline, the globetrotting adventure and the epic musical score that sometimes gets a bit too epic". He lauded the acting for being "a step above" and concluded his review with: "This might be my favorite Santiago".
