= Rosanne Katon =

American actress

Playboy centerfold appearance
- September 1978
- Preceded by: Vicki Witt
- Succeeded by: Marcy Hanson

Personal details
- Born: February 5, 1954 (age 72) New York City, United States
- Height: 5 ft 2 in (1.57 m)

Rosanne Katon (born February 5, 1954) is an American model, actress, comedian and activist. She was Playboy magazine's Playmate of the Month for its September 1978 issue. Her centerfold was photographed by Mario Casilli.

== Background ==
Katon was born in New York City to a Jamaican-born father and an African-American mother.

== Career ==
Beginning in the mid-1970s, Katon worked steadily in Hollywood, including a stint on Grady, the short-lived spin-off of the hit situation comedy Sanford and Son that starred Whitman Mayo in the title role, and guest appearances on Jason of Star Command, What's Happening!!, Good Times and That's My Mama, which starred Clifton Davis and Starsky and Hutch. She then had leading roles in two Cirio Santiago action films, both released in 1976, Ebony, Ivory & Jade, in which she received top billing, and The Muthers, in which she acted alongside former Playboy centerfold Jean Bell. The shapely actress was often typecast in sex kitten roles in R-rated comedies such as The Swinging Cheerleaders (1974); Chesty Anderson, U.S. Navy (1976); Prime Time a.k.a. American Raspberry (1977); Lunch Wagon (1981); Zapped! (1982) and Bachelor Party (1984). This was solidified by her appearance as the September 1978 Playboy centerfold. She had a recurring role opposite Denzel Washington on the medical drama St. Elsewhere and her appearance in two award-winning UCLA student films, Julie Dash's Illusions, released in 1982, in which she portrayed a singer doubling for a white actress in 1940s Hollywood (whether she did her own singing in the role was not known as of mid December 2012), and S. Torriano Berry's Rich, in which she portrays the title character's supportive girlfriend. Her other film credits included the TV movie The Night They Took Miss Beautiful (1977), the cult horror film Motel Hell (1980), Body and Soul (1981), City Girl (1984) and Harem (1985), opposite Nastassja Kinski and Ben Kingsley.

Katon was selected as Miss Golden Globes for the 1981 awards show. The honor and the task of presenting the statuettes during the ceremony goes to an up-and-coming actress. Katon was the first African American to be selected, since the custom started in 1962.

Additionally, Katon has had several stage credits, including a Broadway lead role in Godspell and a featured role in the parody of women in prison movies, Women Behind Bars.

At one point, Katon segued into the world of stand-up comedy, and during that period in her career, she appeared in the June 1991 Playboy pictorial "Funny Girls", which covered female comedians.

== Humanitarian work ==
In 1984, Katon married Richard M. Walden, who is the president and chief executive officer of Operation USA, an international organization that supplies relief to Third World areas in need such as Rwanda, Cambodia and, more recently, tsunami-ravaged Sri Lanka, Thailand and Indonesia; and to Hurricane Katrina-ravaged areas of Louisiana and Mississippi. Rosanne is an active participant with Operation USA and also serves on its advisory board. The relief group is based in California.

== Personal life ==
In 1984, Katon married Richard Walden. The Waldens have two children, including a son who is autistic and an expert cellist. The family is featured in the 2007 documentary Autism: The Musical which won the 2007 Emmy for Best TV Documentary Special (HBO).

== See also ==
- List of people in Playboy 1970–1979

| Debra Jensen | Janis Schmitt | Christina Smith | Pamela Bryant | Kathryn Morrison | Gail Stanton |
| Karen Morton | Vicki Witt | Rosanne Katon | Marcy Hanson | Monique St. Pierre | Janet Quist |
