= Laban sa Lahat =

1958 Filipino film directed by Cirio H. Santiago

- Directed by: Cirio H. Santiago
- Screenplay by: Cesar Amigo
- Story by: Francisco Coching
- Starring: Fernando Poe Jr.; Leonor Vergara; Lauro Delgado
- Cinematography: Arsenio Dizon
- Edited by: Gervacio Santos
- Music by: Tony Maiquez
- Production company: Premiere Productions
- Release date: October 7, 1958
- Country: Philippines
- Language: Filipino

Laban sa Lahat (transl. Against All) is a 1958 action film based from a novel created by Francisco Coching which was serialized in Liwayway Magazine. The film was directed by Cirio H. Santiago, written by Cesar Amigo and stars Fernando Poe Jr., Leonor Vergara, and Lauro Delgado. In this film, the story centers around a young man named Lupo, who was wrongly and falsely accused of a crime.

== Plot ==
Since childhood, Lupo is characterized by townspeople as a trouble-maker, with his actions often interpreted unfavorably. He grows up facing local prejudice. Clarissa, who has a relationship with him, expresses doubt about his actions while attempting to remain patient with him.

Lupo gets into big trouble when Don Antero and his son, Marco, with the aid of imported thugs, break into the church and strip it of its treasures. The heinous crime is blamed on Lupo, and Dario, Lupe's own brother who is a dedicated policeman, is assigned to head the posse to track him down.

Clarissa, however, is convinced of Lupe's innocence because on the night of the robbery, she had spent the night with him. Unfortunately, she cannot speak out in Lupo's defense without exposing herself to moral condemnation.

Alone, hunted by his own brother, Lupo seeks to redeem himself by uncovering the real culprits. He is able to kill Don Antero in a struggle, but this only serves to aggravate things. He captures Max, one of Marco's henchmen, but is cornered by the posse atop the church's bell tower.

Facing the guns at the posse led by his own brother and with Max tied to a lamp post which he can cover from the belfry, Lupe makes a final attempt to clear himself and this he does in a tense, thundering finale.

== Cast ==
- Fernando Poe Jr. as Lupo
- Leonor Vergara as Clarissa
- Lauro Delgado as Dario
- Oscar Roncal as Marco
- Elvira Reyes
- Belen Velasco
- Bruno Punzalan as Max
- Jose Garcia as Don Antero
- Francisco Cruz
- Dencio Padilla
- Bino Garcia
- Paquito Diaz
- Jess Lapid Sr. as Jesus Lapid

== Release ==
Laban sa Lahat was released in the Philippines on October 7, 1958.

== Awards and nominations ==
Year	Award giving body	Category	Nominated work	Results
1959	FAMAS Award	Best Pictures	"Laban sa Lahat"	Nominated
1959	FAMAS Award	Best Director	Cirio H. Santiago	Nominated
1959	FAMAS Award	Best Actor	Fernando Poe Jr.	Nominated
