= Water Wars =

2014 film by Cirio H. Santiago

- Directed by: Cirio H. Santiago; Jim Wynorski (uncredited)
- Written by: Mike MacLean
- Produced by: executive Roger Corman
- Starring: Michael Madsen
- Production company: One Four Seven Productions
- Distributed by: New Horizons
- Release date: 2014
- Running time: 78 mins
- Countries: United States; Philippines
- Language: English

Water Wars, also known as Road Raiders, is a 2014 American post apocalyptic-science fiction film directed by Cirio H. Santiago and Jim Wynorski and starring Michael Madsen, Kevin Stapelton and Monica Leigh. It was Santiago's last film, with the director falling ill and dying during filming in 2008. Santiago was replaced by executive producer Roger Corman with Wynorski; however, the movie took a number of years to be completed and released.

== Cast ==
- Michael Madsen
- Kevin Stapelton
- Monica Leigh
- Athena Lundberg
- David McFarland
- Beau Ballinger
- Will Devaughn
- Riza Santos
- Alvin Anson

== Production ==
The movie was made for Roger Corman's New Horizons. It was shot in the Philippines in 2008. Michael Madsen took the role in part due to a recommendation from Quentin Tarantino that the actor work with Santiago. The movie was one of a number of postapocalpytic films made by Santiago. It used elements and footage from earlier Santiago films such as Stryker and Wheels of Fire, to the point that the film has been called a remake of the first.

== Reception ==
The B-movie French website Dark Side Reviews stated, "Water Wars remains a very funny post-nuke in the second degree, far from the better representatives of the genre, certainly, but still kitsch and entertaining enough". As other later films by the director, the film is noted for the presence of special effects (unusual for Santiago).
