= Firecracker (1981 film) =

- Directed by: Cirio H. Santiago
- Screenplay by: Ken Metcalfe; Cirio H. Santiago
- Story by: Ken Metcalfe; Cirio H. Santiago
- Produced by: Syed Kechik
- Starring: Jillian Kesner; Darby Hinton; Rey Malonzo; Ken Metcalfe
- Cinematography: Ricardo Remias
- Edited by: Gervacio Santos
- Music by: Nonong Buencamino
- Production company: Premiere Productions
- Distributed by: New World Pictures
- Release date: May 1981
- Running time: 83 minutes
- Countries: Philippines; United States
- Language: English

Firecracker is a 1981 martial arts film directed and written by Cirio H. Santiago. The film follows a Los Angeles martial-arts instructor who goes to the Philippines to find her sister.

== Synopsis ==
A Los Angeles martial-arts instructor goes to the Philippines to find her sister.

== Cast ==
- Jillian Kesner-Graver as Susanne Carter, a Los Angeles martial-arts instructor
- Darby Hinton as Chuck Donner
- Rey Malonzo as Rey
- Ken Metcalfe as Erik

== Reception ==
John Beifuss stated in his review "This TNT Jackson remake is more enjoyable than its predecessor, thanks to an outrageous sequence in which Kesner progressively loses her clothing during a battle with a pair of thugs, scored to a jazz-rock Filipino rip-off of the B-52's' Planet Clare."

Psychotronic indicated that the film, with TNT Jackson, was an example of "the "American lady fighter avenges the death of her sister” routine right down to the topless kickboxing scene." The film is also said to reuse the plot of TNT Jackson.

A presentation of the film wrote: "The athletic and sexy Jillian Kesner is assaulted every ten minutes by thugs to practice her martial arts skills. The final showdown takes place in an arena where duels to the death are held [...] The film's big grindhouse moment: the blonde heroine loses her clothes while fleeing and fights her attackers in just her bra and panties."
