= Stryker (1983 film) =

1983 action film by Cirio H. Santiago

- Directed by: Cirio H. Santiago
- Screenplay by: Howard R. Cohen
- Story by: Leonard Hermes
- Produced by: Cirio H. Santiago
- Starring: Steve Sandor; Andrea Savio; William Ostrander
- Cinematography: Ricardo Remias
- Edited by: Bas Santos
- Music by: Ed Gatchalian
- Production company: HCI International
- Distributed by: New World Pictures
- Release date: 1983
- Running time: 85 minutes
- Country: Philippines

Stryker is a Philippine action film directed by Cirio H. Santiago. The film is set in the future where after a nuclear holocaust, survivors battle each other over the remaining water in the world.

== Plot ==
After nuclear war has defoliated the Earth, the survivors live in colonies in an endless quest for drinkable water. A young woman named Delha is on the run from the evil warlord Kardis and his henchman. She is rescued by Stryker and his young companion Bandit. She later finds herself trapped again by Kardis and resists torture to reveal the location of her colony.

Meanwhile, Stryker and Bandit ambush a Kardis water tanker, drive it to his fortress, and manage to escape with Delha. Delha reveals that she has been trying to contact Trun, Stryker's estranged brother, to assist in the defence against Kardis. Trun has been captured and buried by Kardis' men, but is rescued by Stryker. Trun has his lieutenant Bazil to gather his army, but Bazil suddenly betrays them, leading Kardis to attack the colony.

Stryker is then captured and tortured, but is rescued by a group of dwarves to whom he had previously given precious water. After a final climactic battle, Trun's battalion defeats Kardis' army with help of Stryker and the dwarves.

== Reception ==
The Monthly Film Bulletin gave the film a negative review:

"Workaday, predictable, edited to the bone, Stryker is very much a New World yarn. It cruises on automatic pilot from the first frame to the last."

Variety described the film as a:

"Grade-D imitation of "The Road Warrior...'Stryker' offers little for today's action audience."

The Pittsburgh Press called the film "revolting in every way."

The review described Howard R. Cohen's script as "insane" and leading man Steve Sandor as "ugly", as well as a "combination imitation of Indiana Jones and Mad Max", and that director Santiago's shots "rarely match, making for sloppy editing and enervating tedium".

A review in Phil Hardy's book Science Fiction (1984) compared it to other Mad Max derivatives, noting it was "even more ridiculous than its Italian competitor I Nuovi Barbari" and lamenting that director Santiago "used to turn out at least halfway decent movies for Roger Corman's New World from his Filipino base including Fly Me, Savage!, TNT Jackson and the like."

== See also ==
- List of action films of the 1980s
- List of Philippine films of the 1980s
- Mad Max series legacy and influence in popular culture
