= Trident Force =

1988 action film starring Anthony Alonzo

- Directed by: Richard Smith
- Written by: Siegfried Sepulveda; Rossano Abelardo
- Starring: Anthony Alonzo; Nanna Anderson; Mark Gil; Steve Rogers; Eddie M. Gaerlan
- Cinematography: Joe Tutanes
- Edited by: Edgardo Vinarao
- Music by: Gabby Castellano
- Production company: ANNA Films International
- Distributed by: Solar Films
- Release date: December 16, 1988
- Country: Philippines
- Language: Filipino

Trident Force (also known as The Ultimate Solution) is a 1988 Filipino action film directed by Richard Smith and starring Anthony Alonzo, Nanna Anderson, Mark Gil, Steve Rogers, Eddie M. Gaerlan, Ronnie Patterson, Nick Nicholson, and Willy Schober. Produced by ANNA Films International, the film was released by Solar Films in the Philippines on December 16, 1988.

Critic Lav Diaz gave Trident Force a mixed review, deeming its competent filmmaking to be undermined by stereotypical villains and exaggerated characters.

== Plot ==
The Trident Force, an international counter-terrorism organization, is called in to the Middle East to quell and defeat the Palestinian Revolutionary Legion by any means necessary.

== Cast ==
- Anthony Alonzo as Rashid
- Nanna Anderson as Lesley Prentias
- Mark Gil as Ahmed, Rashid's brother
- Steve Rogers as Hawthorn
- Eddie M. Gaerlan as Abu Hassad
- Ronnie Patterson as Casey
- Nick Nicholson as Ox
- Willy Schober as Ibrahim Habash
- Rafael Schulz as Trident Schulz
- Tony Ogumsaya as Trident Robinson
- Majid Jadali as Trident Majid
- Randy Hrobar as Trident Harel
- Jim Moss as Trident Parsons
- Tony Lao as Trident Kimura
- Gerald Tosco as Trident Dobouis
- Carlos Terry as Trident Gomez
- Mike Aguas as Trident Aguas
- Salah Mahfoudi as Sultan of Qumarnesia
- Paul Holmes as Israeli ambassador
- Moshen Hassani as imam
- Bahman Borzoo as ambassador to Jordan

== Release ==
Trident Force was graded "C" by the Movie and Television Review and Classification Board (MTRCB) in the Philippines, indicating a "Fair" quality. The film was released by Solar Films in Philippine theaters on December 16, 1988. In the United States, the film was released on VHS by Diamond Entertainment. In Japan, the film was released on VHS by Herald Videogram. In Ghana, the film was theatrically released in 1994.

=== Critical response ===
Lav Diaz, writing for the Manila Standard, gave Trident Force a mixed review, considering its storytelling to be "direct and competent" while deeming the exaggerated characterizations and stereotypically dumb villains to be "childish" and trivializing.
