= Dune Warriors =

- VHS release poster
- Directed by: Cirio H. Santiago
- Screenplay by: Thomas McKelvey Cleaver
- Produced by: Christopher R. Santiago; Cirio H. Santiago
- Starring: David Carradine
- Cinematography: Joe Batac
- Edited by: Gervacio Santos; Joseph Zucchero
- Music by: Gary Earl; Odette Springer
- Production company: Concorde-New Horizons
- Distributed by: Concorde-New Horizons
- Release date: January 18, 1991
- Running time: 77 minutes
- Country: United States
- Language: English

Dune Warriors is a 1991 American action sci-fi film co-produced and directed by Cirio H. Santiago and starring David Carradine, Rick Hill and Luke Askew. It was executive produced by Roger Corman and filmed in the Philippines.

Several film critics consider the film a rip-off of Mad Max.

== Synopsis ==
Set in the year 2040 in a post-apocalyptic desert, a group of outlaws led by the ruthless William (Askew) prey upon the small cities still standing in the hope of obtaining any water they might possess. When they attempt to take over the town of Chinle, a mysterious warrior named Michael (Carradine) leads a band of fighters to ward off their attack.

== Cast ==
- David Carradine as Michael
- Rick Hill as John
- Luke Askew as William
- Jillian McWhirter as Val
- Blake Boyd as Dorian
- Val Garay as Jason
- Joseph Zucchero as Reynaldo
- Bon Vibar as Emilio
- Henry Strzalkowski as Luis
- Dante Varona as Ricardo
- Maria Isabel Lopez as Miranda
- Nick Nicholson as Tomas
- Ned Hourani as Randall
- Daniel Nicholson as Village Boy
- Joanne Griffin as Mother
