= Luke Askew =

American actor (1932–2012)

- Born: Francis Luke Askew; March 26, 1932; Macon, Georgia, U.S.
- Died: March 29, 2012 (aged 80); Lake Oswego, Oregon, U.S.
- Education: University of Georgia; Mercer University
- Occupations: Actor, musician
- Years active: 1967–2010
- Spouse: Maggie Askew
- Military career
- Allegiance: United States
- Branch: United States Air Force
- Unit: Strategic Air Command
- Conflicts: Korean War

Francis Luke Askew (March 26, 1932 – March 29, 2012) was an American actor and musician, best known for his appearances in Western films.

== Early life and education ==
Askew was born on March 26, 1932, in Macon, Georgia, to Milton Dillard Askew (1904–1976) and Dorothy Doolittle (1910–1969). Askew attended the University of Georgia for a business degree and the Walter F. George School of Law at Mercer University. In his collegiate years, Askew served in the U.S. Air Force during the Korean War, serving in the intelligence division of Strategic Air Command.

== Career ==
=== Acting ===
After appearing in Off-Broadway plays, Askew made his film debut in Hurry Sundown (1967), but was first noticed as an actor for his role in Cool Hand Luke (1967). The following year he worked with John Wayne in The Green Berets (with his hair cut short).

In 1969, he worked with Dennis Hopper and Peter Fonda in Easy Rider, with his "Hitchhiker" character (credited as "Stranger on Highway") achieving worldwide popularity and also making Askew a recognizable face in subsequent films. He would later took part in Easy Rider: Shaking the Cage (1999), a documentary about the making of Easy Rider, and the 2003 documentary Easy Riders, Raging Bulls: How the Sex, Drugs and Rock 'N' Roll Generation Saved Hollywood.

Askew starred for the first time in a role in the almost-forgotten Spaghetti Western Night of the Serpent (La notte dei serpenti; 1969), which is now considered a cult film. He continued to work as an actor after that, predominantly appearing in supporting or villain roles in genre films like The Warrior and the Sorceress (1984) and Dune Warriors (1991), as well as guest roles on television series; this includes work on such series as: Bonanza, The High Chaparral, Mission: Impossible, Cannon, The Rockford Files, Quincy, M.E., The Six Million Dollar Man, T. J. Hooker, L.A. Law, MacGyver, Walker, Texas Ranger, Murder She Wrote, and HBO's Big Love.

=== Other work ===
In addition to his acting career, Askew was also a rock and blues singer who frequently performed at the Gaslight Cafe. According to Bob Dylan, when Luke sang at it was like a "guy who sounded like Bobby Blue Bland".

== Death ==
Askew later moved to Lake Oswego, Oregon. He died at Lake Oswego on March 29, 2012, three days after his 80th birthday, due to lung cancer.

== Partial filmography ==
- Hurry Sundown (1967) .... Dolph Higginson
- The Happening (1967) .... Second Motorcycle Officer
- Cool Hand Luke (1967) .... Boss Paul
- Will Penny (1967) .... Foxy
- The Devil's Brigade (1968) .... Private Hubert Hixon
- The Green Berets (1968) .... Sergeant Provo
- Easy Rider (1969) .... Stranger on Highway
- Flareup (1969) .... Alan Moris
- Night of the Serpent (1969) .... Luke
- Angel Unchained (1970) .... Jonathan Tremaine
- The Culpepper Cattle Company (1972) .... Luke
- The Great Northfield Minnesota Raid (1972) .... Jim Younger
- The Magnificent Seven Ride! (1972) .... Mark Skinner
- Pat Garrett and Billy the Kid (1973) .... Eno
- Slipstream (1973) .... Mike Mallard
- A Matter of Wife... and Death (1975) .... Snell
- Posse (1975) .... Krag
- Walking Tall Part 2 (1975) .... Pinky Dobson
- Mackintosh and T.J. (1975) .... Cal
- Rolling Thunder (1977) .... Automatic Slim
- Wanda Nevada (1979) .... Ruby Muldoon
- The Beast Within (1982) .... Dexter Ward
- The Warrior and the Sorceress (1984) .... Zeg the Tyrant
- Bialy smok (1987) .... Frank Brown
- Bulletproof (1988) .... Gen. Gallo
- Back to Back (1989) .... Wade Duro
- No Retreat, No Surrender 3: Blood Brothers (1990) .... Atteron
- Dune Warriors (1991) .... William
- The Friends of Harry (1995) .... Harry
- Frank & Jesse (1995) .... Lone Rider
- Savage (1996) .... Capt. Rohmer
- Traveller (1997) .... Boss Jack Costello
- The Newton Boys (1998) .... Chief Schoemaker
- South of Heaven, West of Hell (2000) .... Leland Henry
- Frailty (2001) .... Sheriff Smalls
- The Greatest Game Ever Played (2005) .... Alec Campbell

=== Television ===
- Mission: Impossible (1968) – The Execution .... Victor Pietro Duchell
- The High Chaparral (1969) – Shadow on the Wind .... Johnny Ringo
- Bonanza (1971; part of last season that was not aired*) – Kingdom of Fear .... Deputy Hatch
- Bearcats! (1971) – Man in a Cage .... Greer
- S.W.A.T. (1975) – Murder By Fire .... Todd
- Police Story (1975/1976; 2 episodes) – (1) Headhunter .... Eamon Kinsella Royce; (2) Blue .... Nicholson
- BJ and the Bear (1979) .... Blackwell
- Knight Rider (1983) – A Nice, Indecent Little Town .... Ron Austin
- T.J. Hooker (1983) – The Shadow of Truth .... Brad Thurman
- Big Love (2007–2010) .... Hollis Green (final appearance)
