= Fast Gun =

- Directed by: Cirio H. Santiago
- Starring: Rick Hill
- Production company: Concorde-New Horizons
- Release date: 1988
- Country: United States
- Language: English

Fast Gun is a 1988 American action film directed by Cirio H. Santiago. It was produced by Ed Carlin and starred Rick Hill.

== Cast ==
- Rick Hill
- Kaz Garas
- Robert Dryer
- Brenda Bakke
- Ken Metcalfe
- Anthony East
- Paul Holmes
- Henry Strzalkowski
- David Light

== Reception ==
According to monsterhuntermoviereviews.com, "Even by Santiago’s extremely lax standards, Fast Gun is a Filipino action movie that seems as slipshod as the moronic schemes the various bad guys spend the film constantly screwing up. Right from the beginning, it's clear no one involved with making the movie is paying attention to anything that's being committed to film."

According to explosiveaction.com, "So it's nothing original - which from the guy that ripped off Mad Max at least six times, even using footage from his own ripoffs more than once - I came to accept, and in fact applaud. I've said it before, sometimes you want the fancy steak and mushroom pie with red wine jus, but other times you just want a plain meat pie with some tomato sauce on the side and a thumping 80's soundtrack. Fast Gun is that sort of pie."
