= Get My Son Dead or Alive =

- Directed by: Pepe Marcos
- Screenplay by: Diego C. Cagahastian; Jerry O. Tirazona
- Story by: Felix Dalay
- Produced by: Jerry Paz Talavera; Precy Mendiola Talavera
- Starring: Eddie Garcia; Rudy Fernandez; Vic Vargas
- Cinematography: Rey de Leon
- Edited by: Gervacio Santos
- Music by: Gabby Castellano
- Production company: Tagalog Ilang Ilang Productions
- Distributed by: Tagalog Ilang Ilang Productions
- Release date: May 28, 1982
- Country: Philippines
- Language: Filipino

Get My Son Dead or Alive is a 1982 Filipino action thriller drama film directed by Pepe Marcos. The film stars Eddie Garcia, Rudy Fernandez and Vic Vargas.

== Plot ==
This is the story of Lt. Renato Parraguas (Fernandez), a former soldier assigned in a mission against the NPA rebel guerrillas. His father Maj. Ricardo Parraguas (Garcia), a military officer hunts the NPAs that have captured his son. Unbeknownst to Maj. Garcia, Renato has already joined the NPA under the nom de guerre Ka Dante.

== Cast ==
- Eddie Garcia as Maj. Ricardo Parraguas
- Rudy Fernandez as Lt. Renato Parraguas/Ka Rene
- Vic Vargas as Capt. Carlo Mendoza
- Marilou Bendigo as Ka Milagros
- Perla Bautista as Martha Parraguas
- Philip Gamboa as David
- Nick Aladdin
- Jing Caparas
- Renato del Prado as Ka Rodrigo
- Joseph de Cordova
- Danny Riel
- Ernie Forte
- Baldo Marro as Ka Lawin
- Jose Romulo Ka Rosas
- Larry Silva as Tribio
- Joaquin Fajardo
- Liberty De Ramos
- Vilma Vitug
- Celso Paz Talavera as Jack Vera
