= Lauro Delgado =

Filipino actor

- Born: Loreto Porciuncula; December 10, 1932; Bocaue, Bulacan, Philippine Islands
- Died: January 15, 1978 (aged 45); Bulacan, Philippines
- Occupation: Actor
- Years active: 1953–1976

Lauro Delgado (December 10, 1932 – January 15, 1978) was a Filipino actor, born as Loreto Porciuncula in Bocaue, Bulacan. He was discovered by the director Gerardo de Leon.

Starting his acting career in the 1950s, Delgado primarily had villainous roles in films produced by Premiere Productions and People's Pictures, and was billed as the leading actor in the 1960 film Sa Mata ng Diyos ("In the Eyes of God") along with Tessie Quintana, Leonor Vergara, Carlos Padilla, Jr. and child actor Aida Villegas. Delgado continued playing leading and character roles up to the 1970s.

Delgado retired from showbiz when his poultry business in Bulacan became successful. He died in 1978 due to heart attack, and was buried in his hometown of Bocaue.

== Filmography ==
- 1953 - Sawa sa Lumang Simboryo
- 1954 - Salabusab
- 1954 - Paladin
- 1955 - Palahamak
- 1955 - Eskrimador
- 1955 - El Jugador
- 1955 - Sagrado
- 1955 - Pandanggo ni Neneng
- 1955 - El conde de Monte Carlo
- 1956 - Santa Lucia
- 1956 - Prinsipe Villarba
- 1956 - Exzur
- 1957 - Bicol Express
- 1957 - Pabo Real
- 1957 - Yaya Maria
- 1957 - Pusakal
- 1957 - Prinsipe Alejandre
- 1958 - Batang Piyer
- 1958 - Sta. Rita de Casia
- 1958 - Obra-Maestra
- 1958 - Laban sa Lahat
- 1958 - Wanted: Husband
- 1959 - Mekeni, Abe
- 1960 - Sa Mata ng Diyos
- 1966 - Claudia
- 1966 - Frame-Up!
- 1967 - Solo Flight
- 1967 - The Assassin
- 1968 - Manila, Open City
- 1968 - Salamisim
- 1968 - The Specialists
- 1969 - The Mad Killers
- 1969 - Patria Adorada (Dugo ng Bayani)
- 1969 - Blue-Seal Mataharis
- 1976 - Hindi Kami Damong Ligaw
- 1976 - Babae... Sa Likod ng Salamin
