= Silk (1986 film) =

1986 film by Cirio H. Santiago

Silk is a 1986 American-Philippine action film directed by Cirio H. Santiago and produced by Roger Corman. The film stars Cec Verrell as Jenny "Silk" Sleighton, a tough and stylish cop in Honolulu, Hawaii. While investigating a series of small-time smuggling operations, Silk uncovers a larger criminal syndicate that is trafficking Asian mobsters into the United States by buying the identities of Hawaiian citizens. Her investigation leads to a trail of murders, confrontations with gangland figures, and a deadly conspiracy that implicates a cop within her own force. The film is known for its B movie aesthetic, action sequences, and Verrell's performance as the titular protagonist.

The movie led to a sequel Silk 2.

== Cast ==
- Cec Verrell as Jenny Sleighton
- Bill McLaughlin as Tom Stevens
- Joe Mari Avellana as Yashi
- Frederick Bailey as Brown

== Reception ==
Reviewer Eoin of theactionelite.com gave the film 2.5 out of 5 stars, writing, "The movie itself isn’t the best and is actually pretty lame but I love the idea of the badass female cop known as Silk."

Critic Vern of outlawvern.com wrote, "This is just not a very exciting story, but I can almost recommend watching it just for Silk herself. Verrell is a badass woman in the Brigitte Nielsen mode, and there just aren’t enough of those in movies."
