= Kill Zone (film) =

- VHS cover art
- Directed by: Cirio H. Santiago
- Release date: 1993
- Country: United States
- Language: English

Kill Zone is a 1993 American Vietnam War film directed by Cirio H. Santiago for Roger Corman starring David Carradine.

B and S About Movies wrote, "Lots of huts blow up. Lots of bodies are mowed down by a never-ending stream of bullets. But there’s also a lot of philosophical war babbling. But when those last ten minutes of film roll... pure Cirio... stock footage be damned. The man knows how to put on a Corman-ploitation styled war drama."

In a review on the Russian-language website b-movies.ru, the film received a 7/10 rating as "good entertainment", while at the same time the film was criticized for being too long. Separately noted was "the most interesting character in the film", the "black athlete", played by American professional football player Tony Dorsett, whose "machine gun works wonders".

== Cast ==
- David Carradine
- Tony Dorsett
- Rob Youngblood
- Vic Trevino
- James Gregory
- Paolleli Geno Bolda
- Jimmy Moss
- Francis Evaristo
- Richard White
- Bob Larson
- Vivian Velez
- Ken Metcalfe
- Archie Adamos
