= Cec Verrell =

American actress

- Born: Cecelia Marie Verrell; April 7, 1958 (age 68)
- Occupation: Actress

Cecelia Marie Verrell (born April 7, 1958), nicknamed "Beebee", is an American actress who has starred in various television programs including the 1988 science fiction cult film Hell Comes to Frogtown as Centinella.

== Filmography ==
- 2001 Nice Guys Finish Dead as Shauna
- 1999 ER - (TV series) (1 episode) as Mrs. Casey
- 1999 Air America (1999) - (TV series) (1 episode) as Sandra Casey
- 1997 The Price of Kissing as Renee's Mother
- 1997 Wings (1997) - (TV series) (1 episode) as Wanda Harrison
- 1996 Paihnidi (1996)
- 1996 NYPD Blue (1996) - (TV series) (1 episode) as Gail Keller
- 1995 M.A.N.T.I.S. (1995) - (TV series) (1 episode) as Dr. Marissa Savoy
- 1994 Murder, She Wrote (1994) - (TV series) (1 episode) as Joellen Waller
- 1994 The X-Files - (TV series) (episode: "Lazarus") as Lula Phillips
- 1994 Space Rangers - (TV series) (1 episode) as Ree
- 1993 Three of Hearts as Allison
- 1992 Perry Mason: The Case of the Heartbroken Bride (TV) as 'Rocky'
- 1992 Inside Out III as Susan 'Tango'
- 1992 Mad at the Moon as Sally
- 1991 Inside Out as Psychiatrist
- 1991 Death Dreams as Denise Massell
- 1990 Super Force - (TV series) as Patty Pretty
- 1989 Matlock - (TV series) (1 episode) as Sheila Carver
- 1989 Nick Knight (TV) as Janette
- 1988-1989 Hunter: City Under Siege (TV Series) (3 episodes) as Iris Smith
- 1988 Transformations as Antonia
- 1988 Supercarrier - (TV series) (8 episodes) as Lieutenant Ruth 'Bee Bee' Ruthkowski
- 1988 Hell Comes to Frogtown as Centinella
- 1988 Cheers (1988) (TV series) (1 episode) as Jennifer McCall
- 1987 Stingray (TV series) (1 episode) - DEA Agent Barbara
- 1987 Eye of the Eagle as Chris Chandler
- 1986 L.A. Law (TV series) (3 episodes) as Angela Cipriano
- 1986 Silk as Jenny Sleighton
- 1986 Hollywood Vice Squad as Judy
- 1986 Hardesty House as April
- 1984 Runaway as Hooker
