= The Muthers =

- Theatrical poster
- Directed by: Cirio H. Santiago
- Written by: Cyril St. James
- Produced by: Cirio H. Santiago
- Starring: Jeannie Bell; Rosanne Katon; Trina Parks; Jayne Kennedy
- Cinematography: Ricardo Remias
- Edited by: Gervacio Santos
- Music by: Edd Villanueva
- Distributed by: Dimension Pictures
- Release date: November 1976
- Running time: 83 minutes
- Country: Philippines
- Language: English

The Muthers is a 1976 English-language Filipino blaxploitation women in prison film. It starred Jeannie Bell, Rosanne Katon, Trina Parks, Jayne Kennedy, Tony Carreon and John Montgomery.

Quentin Tarantino later wrote, "So why is this cruddy little flick one of my favorite movies? It's the playful execution of a preposterous story that's the key to the film's charm."

== Plot ==
Two women named Kelly and Angie lead a gang of modern-day pirates in the South Seas, passing on the valuables taken from rich travelers and shippers to comparably poor villagers. A Justice Department official informs Kelly that her sister Sandra has been swept up in a trafficking operation and isolated in a prison camp run by crime boss Montiero, disguised as a legitimate coffee plantation, and offers her gang immunity from prosecution if they can infiltrate and convey the information that will help them shut it down. When the women penetrate the camp, they eventually recruit longtime prisoner Marcie, and Montiero's mistress Serena, to forment a rebellion and escape from the compound.

== Cast ==
- Jean Bell as Kelly (credited as Jeanne Bell)
- Rosanne Katon as Angie
- Trina Parks as Marcie
- Jayne Kennedy as Serena
- Tony Carreon as Monteiro (credited as J. Antonio Carrion)
- John Montgomery as Turko
- Sam Sharruff as Sancho
- Dick Piper as Murphy
- Ken Metcalfe as Barrows
- Rocco Montalban as Rocco (credited as Rock Monte)
- Bill Baldridge as Captain Montes
- Bert Olivar as Navarro (credited as Bert Oliver)
