= Ebony, Ivory & Jade =

- Theatrical release poster
- Directed by: Cirio Santiago
- Produced by: Cirio Santiago
- Starring: Rosanne Katon; Colleen Camp; Christie Mayuga
- Distributed by: Dimension Pictures
- Release date: 1976
- Country: United States
- Language: English

Ebony, Ivory & Jade is a 1976 film by director Cirio Santiago, made in Manila, Philippines. A relatively well-budgeted martial arts feature by Santiago's standards, the film was seen mainly in US drive-in movies, where it was first released as She-Devils in Chains. It has also been released as American Beauty Hostages, Foxfire, and Foxforce.

== Synopsis ==
Five female athletes are kidnapped during an international track meet in "Hong Kong," then fight their way to freedom after being recaptured several times. Considered a minor classic of the blaxploitation genre, Ebony, Ivory & Jade stars Rosanne Katon as track star Pam Rogers, the eponymous "Ebony" of the title. Colleen Camp co-stars as Ginger "Ivory" Douglas, her privileged track and field white rival. Christie Mayuga appears as Jackie, a.k.a. "Jade."

This film is unrelated to the 1980 TV-movie pilot starring Debbie Allen, Martha Smith and Bert Convy.

== Legacy ==
The film was poorly received, due to its low production values.

Admired by director Quentin Tarantino, the film is referenced in Pulp Fiction by Uma Thurman's character, who speaks about her role in an unsuccessful television series called Fox Force Five. The trailer for Ebony, Ivory & Jade also used the phrase "roaring rampage of revenge", a phrase used to describe Kill Bill: Volume 1 and referred to in the opening of Kill Bill: Volume 2.
