= Deborah Tranelli =

American actress

Deborah Tranelli is an American actress and singer.

== Early years ==
Tranelli is a native of Corning, New York, who grew up in Schenectady, New York. Her parents, Tony and June Tranelli, are both musicians, and she developed an interest in music at an early age. She attributed some of her dancing abilities to ballet classes that she took while she was in elementary schoo. She attended Linton High School in Schenectady, New York and is a 1977 graduate of Northwestern University with a bachelor's degree in speech.

== Career ==
Tranelli stayed in Chicago for three years after she graduated from Northwestern. During that span she performed in shows, was part of groups that sang for commercials, and was involved in a variety of kinds of music.

She is best known for her recurring role in the soap opera Dallas as Phyllis Wapner, secretary to Bobby Ewing (played by Patrick Duffy). She appeared in the series from 1981 to its end in 1991. Her acting career has included roles on television series from Nero Wolfe (episode "Might as Well Be Dead, 1981) to Law & Order (episode "Seed", 1995). She starred in and performed the song "Rather Love" in the 1985 movie Naked Vengeance, and released a 2004 jazz album "A Lot of Livin'" which won three BackStage Bistro awards. She has more recently been performing theatre in New York City.

In the late 1990s and early 2000s Tranelli gave more than 40 concerts in a two-year span in addition to performing in regional theater.
