= Eye of the Eagle 2: Inside the Enemy =

1989 film directed by Carl Franklin

- Directed by: Carl Franklin
- Written by: Carl Franklin; Dan Gagliasso
- Produced by: Catherine Santiago; Cirio H. Santiago
- Starring: Todd Field
- Release date: 1989
- Running time: 78 minutes
- Country: United States
- Language: English

Eye of the Eagle 2: Inside the Enemy (released in the Philippines as Killed in Action) is a 1989 film directed by Carl Franklin. It is the sequel to the 1987 film Eye of the Eagle.

It was shot in the Philippines.

== Cast ==
- Todd Field (as William Todd Field)
- Shirley Tesoro

== Release ==
Eye of the Eagle 2 was released in the United States in 1989. In the Philippines, the film was released as Killed in Action on August 11, 1989.

=== Critical reception ===
Eric Reifschneider of bloodbrothersfilms.com gave the film a rating of 2.5/5, writing, "It surprisingly is an 'emotionally' driven low-budget war film that's main focus is on characters, not low budget action antics."

Nils Bothmann of actionfreunde.de wrote that director Carl Franklin, "illustrates the American disappointment in this unheroic war."

Reviewer Vern of outlawvern.com wrote, "this is an example of the kind of thing I like where a director is able to put their stamp on lowbrow genre movies and later evolve into whatever it is they want to do".

Timothy Young of mondo-esoterica.com called the film "A complete change of pace for the series, Inside the Enemy is well written, covering some very interesting ideas but some poor editing and generic music leaves the action scenes feeling flat - fortunately this is not an action picture and the rest of the film looks good with some strong acting. Of interest to fans of the more serious war movies."
