= Darine Stern =

African-American model

Darine Amber Stern
- Stern on the cover of the October 1971 issue of Playboy magazine
- Born: November 16, 1947; Chicago, Illinois
- Died: February 5, 1994 (aged 46); Chicago, Illinois
- Education: Chicago State University
- Occupation: Model
- Years active: 1966-1994
- Known for: the first African-American model featured on the cover of Playboy magazine by herself, Oct 1971 issue
- Spouse: David Ray (m. 1970, divorced)
- Modeling information
- Hair color: Black
- Eye color: Brown

Darine Stern (November 16, 1947 – February 5, 1994) was an American model and the first African-American model featured on the cover of Playboy magazine by herself.

== Biography ==
Stern was the first black woman to appear as a solo model on the cover of Playboy magazine in the October 1971 issue.

Her appearance followed that of Jean Bell, who was featured on the magazine's January 1970 cover along with four white models.

She began her career in the late 1960s as a bank teller and hostess for the Top of the Hancock Building Restaurant. There she acquired various well-known admirers and met her soon-to-be-husband, David Ray. During the time that she was a bank teller, a photographer visiting her bank asked to take her photograph. Images he took came to the attention of the Playboy editorial team, which resulted in her being chosen to appear on the cover of the magazine.

After marrying Ray, she settled for a time into the role of being a dentist's wife, and stepmother to Ray's son. However, in the course of time, she went to New York City to further her modelling career, and she and Ray divorced.

Following her cover on Playboy, Stern went on to become a high-profile model, being represented by Ford Models, Nina Blanchard, Ellen Harth and Shirley Hamilton Models of Chicago and New York, even doing some European runways. After a short time in Los Angeles, she returned to Chicago to work as a fashion director, image consultant and costume designer.

She created Darine Stern Agency to foster the careers of emerging models. In the early 90s Darine relocated to Martha's Vineyard, Massachusetts and had a relationship with African American business leader Kenton Clarke.

She died on February 5, 1994, due to complications of breast cancer.
