= Final Mission (1984 film) =

1984 film by Cirio H. Santiago

- Directed by: Cirio H. Santiago
- Written by: Jose Mari Avellana; Joseph Zucchero; Anthony Maharaj (story)
- Produced by: Cirio H. Santiago; Anthony Maharaj (executive producer)
- Starring: Richard Young; Christine L. Tudor; Kaz Garas; John Ericson
- Cinematography: Ricardo Remias
- Edited by: Gervacio Santos
- Music by: Georges Garvarentz
- Production companies: Westbrook; M.P. Film; D.S. Pictures
- Distributed by: Parafrance Films (theatrical, France); Scotia Filmverleih (theatrical, Germany); Succéfilm AB (theatrical, Sweden); Seven Keys (theatrical, Australia); Thorn EMI (video)
- Release date: 1984
- Running time: 101 minutes (theatrical, US video); 100 minutes (theatrical, France); 98 minutes (theatrical, Australia); 97 minutes (UK video)
- Countries: United States; Philippines
- Language: English
- Budget: $300,000

Final Mission is a 1984 action adventure film directed by Cirio H. Santiago and written by Jose Mari Avellana and Joseph Zucchero. It stars Richard Young and Kaz Garas with John Ericson and Christine L. Tudor in supporting roles.

== Plot ==
During the Vietnam War, decorated soldier Vince Deacon (Richard Young) discovers fellow soldier Slater (John Dresden has become a traitor and joined the Viet Cong. Deacon beats and captures Slater, who vows revenge.

Years later, Deacon is married, has a son, and is a Los Angeles Police Department SWAT captain with a reputation for violence in the line of duty. Slater, who has become a crime boss, discovers Deacon's whereabouts and sends thugs to his home. Deacon kills one of them while protecting his family, leading to his suspension. Deacon and his family take a vacation to camp near a lake, but Slater tracks them down and orchestrates a bombing that kills Deacon's wife and son.

Driven by vengeance, Deacon tracks Slater to Pinesville, a small California mountain town. During his investigation he discovers that the local sheriff (Kaz Garas) is Slater's brother and allows his criminal activities. Undeterred, Deacon continues his pursuit, battling against resistance from the deputies and local townspeople.

As his campaign goes on, Deacon slips into shell shock and begins believing he is still in Vietnam. He gathers weapons and leaves them in the woods near the town before stealing a high-power rifle from a local gun shop and going to war with Slater's gang. Their battle overruns the town, and Deacon finally manages to kill Slater. However, Slater's death prompts his brother to pursue his own vendetta against Deacon, and he calls in the National Guard.

Deacon retreats into the woods outside the town, pursued by the deputies and the Guardsmen. His former superior officer, Colonel Cain (John Ericson), also arrives, hoping to end the conflict diplomatically. The sheriff's forces corner Deacon on a mountain, and Cain goes in to speak with him. At first, Deacon is unable to see sense and even points his gun at Cain, but Cain manages to get through to him and calm him down. Deacon begins descending the mountain with Cain, only for Cain to suddenly be shot dead. With his spirit and grasp on reality both completely shattered, Deacon unleashes a hail of bullets on the men encircling him. He is injured when they return fire, but defiantly keeps shooting as the overwhelming forces advance upon him.

== Production ==
=== Development ===
Final Mission was the first in a trilogy of films made by producer Anthony Maharaj and director Cirio H. Santiago who first met in January 1982 at the Manila International Film Festival.

Maharaj was impressed with the footage of Santiago's Stryker (1983) that was screened at the festival and came up with the idea of a collaboration. He suggested a story inspired by Ted Kotcheff's First Blood. Santiago hired regular collaborators Jose Mari Avellana and American expatriate filmmaker Joseph Zucchero to write a screenplay based on Maharaj's outline.

=== Filming ===
Most of the picture was filmed on location in the Philippines, mainly in and around Baguio and Lake Caliraya. Some second unit scenes were shot in downtown Los Angeles, particularly in the Skid Row neighborhood.

=== Music ===
French composer Georges Garvarentz was commissioned to write an orchestral score and to contribute to the title song Always On My Mind, a Soft rock melodic ballad performed by Steve Butler and produced by Alistair Gordon. The soundtrack was released as a Single in France by the Decca label.

== Release ==
Final Mission premiered theatrically in France on July 25, 1984 with 23 prints in the Paris region where it sold 46,923 tickets within two weeks followed by other European countries including Sweden, Denmark, Finland, Germany and Switzerland as well as Australia, Mexico and Peru. The movie received only token theatrical runs in the United States in 1984.

It was released in the United States on VHS and Betamax videocassette by Thorn EMI / HBO Video.

== Reception ==
In its contemporary review, Variety called Final Mission "a routine action drama about a war vet out for revenge". It noted the heavy First Blood influence and mentioned that "as usual with a Santiago film, technical credits are good. Acting is okay, with a guest appearance by John Ericson as a military expert who helps Vince figure out who had the explosives expertise to help the punks blow up his boat."

VideoHound's Golden Movie Retriever gave Final Mission a one-bone rating (on a scale from zero to four bones) and wrote: "Sounds like First Blood though obviously less grand and glorious."

Daniel R. Budnik wrote in his review in 80s Action Movies on the Cheap: "Solid storytelling and good action make the film worth a watch" and concluded "The film is good, but that ending is fantastic". He criticized Georges Garvarentz's score "The orchestra rises up high and makes all the action scenes rousing and brilliant, except when they're not... they end up looking overdone, which happens on more than one occasion". He praised the theme song as being "straight from the Foreigner playbook and it's cool."
