= Kaz Garas =

Lithuanian-American actor

- Born: Kazimieras Gaižutis; March 4, 1940 (age 86); Kaunas, Lithuania
- Occupation: Actor
- Years active: 1966-2004

Kaz Garas (né Kazimieras Gaižutis; born March 4, 1940, Kaunas) is a Lithuanian-American retired actor, best known for his co-starring role as Hamlyn Gynt in the crime/mystery television series Strange Report, as well as his subsequent extensive episodic appearances on television, usually as sheriffs or criminals.

== Selected filmography ==
- The Last Safari (1967) - Casey
- Hawaii Five-O (TV Series; multiple appearances) - Johnny Fargo (1968), Craig Howard (1969), and Mark (1979)
- Love Is a Funny Thing (1969) - Paul
- Strange Report (1969-1970, TV Series) - Hamlyn Gynt
- The Sheriff (1971, TV Movie) - Harve Gregory
- Ben (1972) - Joe Greer
- The Rookies (1972) - Twofer
- The Streets of San Francisco (1974, episode 'Inferno') - Jason
- Wonder Woman (1974, TV Movie) - Steve Trevor
- Half a House (1975) - Artie
- Murder in Peyton Place (1977, TV Movie) - Springer
- Wonder Woman (1979, TV Series) - Lucas
- Starsky & Hutch (1979, TV Series) - Carlyle
- Massarati and the Brain (1982, TV Movie) - Nick Henry
- The Powers of Matthew Star (TV Series; episode "Daredevil", 10/01/1982) - Burt Garner
- Final Mission (1984) - Pinesville County Sheriff
- Naked Vengeance (1985) - Fletch
- Puppet Master 5: The Final Chapter (1994) - Man #2
- Piranha (1995, TV Movie) - Sheriff Carl
- Humanoids From the Deep (1996, TV Movie) - Sheriff Barnes
- Switched at Birth (1999, TV Movie) - Courthouse Reporter
- Mean Creek (2004) - Detective Wright (final film role)
