= Strange Report =

1969 British TV drama series

- Genre: Crime drama Mystery
- Starring: Anthony Quayle; Kaz Garas; Anneke Wills
- Opening theme: Roger Webb
- Composer: Roger Webb
- Country of origin: United Kingdom
- Original language: English
- No. of episodes: 16

Production
- Executive producer: Norman Felton
- Producer: Robert Buzz Berger
- Editor: Keith Palmer
- Running time: 50 mins
- Production companies: Arena Productions; ITC Entertainment

Original release
- Network: ITV
- Release: 21 September 1969 – 11 January 1970

Strange Report is a British television crime drama series starring Anthony Quayle as Adam Strange. It was produced by ITC Entertainment and first broadcast in 1969 on ITV.

In the United States, NBC broadcast Strange Report between 8 January and 10 September 1971. It aired on Fridays from 10:00 to 11:00 p.m. Eastern Time throughout its American run.

== Plot ==
Adam Strange (Anthony Quayle), a retired Home Office criminologist, solves bizarre cases with the help of Hamlyn Gynt (Kaz Garas), Evelyn McClean (Anneke Wills) and sometimes Professor Marks (Charles Lloyd-Pack). He employs the latest techniques in forensic investigation, which he undertakes in his own laboratory in his flat in Warwick Crescent in the Maida Vale/Little Venice area of London.

== Cast ==
Kaz Garas, Anneke Wills, and Anthony Quayle

- Anthony Quayle as Adam Strange
- Kaz Garas as Hamlyn Gynt
- Anneke Wills as Evelyn McClean
- Bryan Marshall as Inspector Purcell

== Production ==
=== Development ===
Unlike other ITC productions, which were created in order to be sold to the US market, Strange Report was created in collaboration with NBC's films unit Arena in the United States (the show's executive producer was Norman Felton, better known for his involvement in The Man from U.N.C.L.E.); the suggestion was that the first half of the series would take place in the United Kingdom, and the second half would see Strange visiting the United States. This idea could not be agreed upon, which explains why such a short season of episodes was created. Quayle and Wills decided not to continue with the series, owing to personal concerns.

=== Music ===
The series's opening theme, composed by Roger Webb, was also available as sheet music.

=== Filming ===
It was filmed between July 1968 and March 1969, on location and at Pinewood Studios, Iver Heath, Buckinghamshire.

== Episodes ==
Airdate is for ATV Midlands. ITV regions varied date and order.

No. overall	No. in series	Title	Directed by	Written by	Original release date	Prod. code	Filmed
1	1	"REPORT 5055: CULT – Murder Shrieks Out"	Charles Crichton	Moris Farhi	21 September 1969	104	Sep 1968
A pop singer is electrocuted during a charity performance; through this Adam Strange becomes involved with a religious sect focused on charitable works, and he requires Ham Gynt to infiltrate it.
2	2	"REPORT 0649: SKELETON – Let Sleeping Heroes Lie"	Peter Medak	Brian Degas and Tudor Gates	28 September 1969	103	Aug/Sep 1968
When it is found that a man whose skeleton has been found on a London Second World War bombsite was killed by a bullet and not a falling bomb, Strange investigates a thirty-year-old crime.
3	3	"REPORT 2641: HOSTAGE – If You Won't Learn, Die!"	Charles Crichton	John Kruse	5 October 1969	115	Feb 1969
Strange is called in to mediate when a Chinese diplomat is kidnapped and the Chinese government threatens to retaliate.
4	4	"REPORT 0846: LONELY HEARTS – Who Killed Dan Cupid?"	Peter Duffell	Roger Parkes	12 October 1969	116	Feb/Mar 1969
The owner of a lonely hearts club is murdered, and the police arrest a client recently introduced to a girl who has a big-time crook for a friend.
5	5	"REPORT 8319: GRENADE – What Price Change?"	Charles Crichton	Bill Strutton	19 October 1969	113	Jan 1969
A clash between factions at a university demonstrating about defence research looks like descending into violence. The police ask Strange to look into the affair.
6	6	"REPORT 3906: COVERGIRLS – Last Year's Model"	Peter Duffell	Terence Maples	26 October 1969	110	Nov/Dec 1968
Strange finds himself entangled in the world of fashion when Evelyn models for a designer whose collection is then stolen and is threatened unless she pulls out of the show.
7	7	"REPORT 3424: EPIDEMIC – A Most Curious Crime"	Daniel Petrie	Don Brinkley	2 November 1969	107	Oct/Nov 1968
Strange meets the men who turn blood into gold by smuggling illegal immigrants into Britain. One of the immigrants has cholera, bringing with it heartbreak, disillusionment, and murder.
8	8	"REPORT 2475: REVENGE – When a Man Hates"	Charles Crichton	Martin Hall	9 November 1969	109	Nov 1968
Strange finds himself on the death list of a man released from prison, who is bent on wreaking revenge on the people who put him there. The problem is, who is he and where is he?
9	9	"REPORT 1021: SHRAPNEL – The Wish in the Dream"	Brian Smedley-Aston	Jan Read	23 November 1969	114	Feb 1969
Following a man's death, Strange becomes personally involved when he receives a coded tape recording. Uncanny events lead to an eternal triangle and possible murder.
10	10	"REPORT 8944: HAND – A Matter of Witchcraft"	Peter Duffell	Edward DeBlasio	30 November 1969	112	Dec 1968/Jan 1969
Strange is asked to help the police when a young office worker is murdered in brutal circumstances and witchcraft seems to be involved.
11	11	"REPORT 1553: RACIST – A Most Dangerous Proposal"	Peter Duffell	Arthur Dales	7 December 1969	102	Aug 1968
A story about the conflicting ideals of father and daughter: he a racist leader of an anti-black organisation, she tolerant and a believer in integration. When a clergyman is murdered and the father is suspected, Scotland Yard asks Strange to investigate a potentially explosive racial situation.
12	12	"REPORT 7931: SNIPER – When is Your Cousin Not?"	Peter Medak	Nicholas Palmer	14 December 1969	106	Oct 1968
A student leader is murdered in an East European country. A girl who claims to be Strange's cousin lures him there to investigate.
13	13	"REPORT 4821: X-RAY – Who Weeps for the Doctor?"	Charles Crichton	Roger Parkes	21 December 1969	111	Dec 1968
A man commits suicide because a set of X-ray photos shows he had a brain tumour. At the autopsy it is found that no such condition existed. Strange investigates how this mistake could have occurred.
14	14	"REPORT 2493: KIDNAP – Whose Pretty Girl Are You?"	Daniel Petrie	Don Brinkley	28 December 1969	105	Sep 1968
A beauty queen is kidnapped, but is it a publicity stunt or real? The girl's wealthy father asks Strange to help, and what is thought to be a hoax takes a nasty turn.
15	15	"REPORT 4407: HEART – No Choice for the Donor"	Robert Asher	Edward DeBlasio	4 January 1970	101	Jul/Aug 1968
When a noted heart surgeon goes missing, his wife goes to Strange, believing he has been kidnapped to perform a heart transplant on a ruthless foreign dictator using a live donor.
16	16	"REPORT 4977: SWINDLE – Square Root of Evil"	Brian Smedley-Aston	Leigh Vance	11 January 1970	108	Nov 1968
A gang of swindlers trick a banknote printing company into printing a massive order of a country's currency, but it soon transpires that the government of that country has no knowledge of the deal.

== Broadcast ==
The series was repeated on UK satellite channel Bravo in 1996/1997, and on UK digital terrestrial channel ITV4, from digitally restored prints, in 2005/2006. (The episode "Heart" was not screened by ITV4.) Satellite channel Men and Motors screened the series in 2007.

== Home media ==
Techno Film released two episodes – "Shrapnel" and "Hostage" – on Super 8 cine film for home use in 1970.

ITC Video released two VHS tapes of the series in the UK in 1994, one containing the episodes "Heart" and "X-Ray", and the other "Covergirls" and "Cult".

The series was digitally restored for Carlton Visual Entertainment by BBC Resources in 2003. The full series was released on DVD in the UK by the Network imprint as a five-disc special edition in 2004 and as a four-disc edition in 2005. The special edition was subsequently re-released in the UK in 2007 and the regular one in 2009. The series was also released on DVD in Australia by Umbrella Entertainment in 2007. In 2011, Network re-released the episode 'Kidnap' in its retro-ACTION! Volume 1 Blu-Ray, this is the first time an episode of the series had been shown in a superior high-definition quality. The same episode was further released in Network's 2018 retro-ACTION! Blu-Ray.

== In other media ==
=== Books ===
A 1970 paperback novel "based on the famous TV series" written by John Burke, adapting two teleplays, was originally published in the UK by Hodder & Stoughton and subsequently reprinted in a US edition published by Lancer Books.

=== Records ===
The theme to the series by Roger Webb was released as a 7 inch single on Columbia records (DB 8803) in 1971. "The World of Love", the song from the episode "Cult", was released as the B-side of The Strangers' first single, "I've Got You", on the little-known Harvard record label (Harv 001) in 1970. The accompaniment to the song is credited to Geoff Love who, in 1972, recorded his own version of the Strange Report theme for the Music For Pleasure LP Geoff Love and his Orchestra Play Your Top TV Themes (MFP 5272). This version can also be found on the Virgin Records CDs This Is Easy (1996) and This is....Cult Fiction Royale (1997), and the ITV 50 Cult TV Themes CD (2005) released to celebrate 50 years of ITV.

In 2009, Network issued a soundtrack album containing Webb's theme music and original scores composed for the episodes "REPORT 4407: HEART – No Choice for the Donor", "REPORT 1553: RACIST – A Most Dangerous Proposal", "REPORT 0649: SKELETON – Let Sleeping Heroes Lie", "REPORT 5055: CULT – Murder Shrieks Out", "REPORT 7931: SNIPER – When is Your Cousin Not?" and "REPORT 3424: EPIDEMIC – A Most Curious Crime", as well as unused and alternate takes, plus library music from other composers also used in the series.
