= Demon of Paradise =

1987 horror film

- Theatrical release poster
- Directed by: Cirio H. Santiago
- Written by: Frederick Bailey; C.J. Santiago
- Produced by: Cirio H. Santiago; Rodman Flender; Leonard Hermes; Matt Leipzig
- Starring: Kathryn Witt; William Steis; Laura Banks; Nick Nicholson
- Cinematography: Ricardo Remias
- Edited by: Gervacio Santos
- Music by: Ding Achacoso
- Production company: New Horizons Pictures
- Distributed by: Concorde-New Horizons; Shout Factory (DVD)
- Release date: April 28, 1987
- Running time: 87 minutes
- Country: United States
- Language: English

Demon of Paradise is a 1987 horror film shot in the Philippines and directed by Cirio H. Santiago.

== Plot ==
The film is set in Hawaii and features fire-twirling women who participate in rituals to appease the awakened monster. The hunters become the prey when illegal dynamite fishing prematurely ends the hibernation of a mythological beast known as Akua which lives in the lake. The owner of the local resort, whose patrons have become the prey of the monster, and a woman herpetologist join forces with the sheriff to save the tourists from succumbing to the fury of the beast.

== Cast ==
- Kathryn Witt as Annie
- William Steis as Keefer
- Laura Banks as Cahill
- Frederick Bailey as Ike
- Leslie Scarborough as Gabby
- Henry Strzalkowski as Shelton
- Nick Nicholson as Langley
- Liza Baumann as Luisa
- David Light as Snake

== Release ==
The film was released on VHS by Warner Home Video in the 1990s. It was later released on DVD and Blu-ray by Shout! Factory in 2011 as a double feature alongside the similar Up From the Depths.

== Reception ==
Paul Ryan from Digital Retribution, who had previously given the film's predecessor Up from the Depths a negative review, gave this film a more positive review stating, "Better made and directed than its predecessor, Demon of Paradise is, while entirely unmemorable, at least easier to sit through."
