= Eye of the Eagle (1987 film) =

1987 film by Cirio H. Santiago

- Directed by: Cirio H. Santiago
- Screenplay by: Joseph Zucchero
- Produced by: Cirio H. Santiago
- Starring: Brett Baxter; Cec Verrell; William Steis; Ed Crick; Robert Patrick
- Release date: 1987
- Running time: 82 minutes
- Countries: United States; Philippines
- Language: English

Eye of the Eagle (also known as The Lost Command) is a 1987 action-thriller film directed and produced by Cirio H. Santiago, written by Joseph Zucchero, and starring Brett Baxter, Cec Verrell, William Steis, Ed Crick and Robert Patrick. It was followed in 1989 by Eye of the Eagle 2: Inside the Enemy.

== Plot ==
Sgt. Rick Stratton sets out to stop a band of renegades known as the Lost Command who are terrorizing South Vietnam.

== Cast ==
- Brett Baxter Clark as Sgt. Stratton
- Robert Patrick as Cpl. Johnny Ransom
- Ed Crick as Sgt. Bo Rattner
- William Steis as Capt. Carter
- Cec Verrell as Chris Chandler
- Rey Malonzo as Cpl. Willy Leung
- Mike Monty as Col. Stark
- Vic Diaz as Col. Trang
- Henry Strzalkowski as Cpl Weasel Watkins
- Willie Williams as Gimme Five
- Nick Nicholson as Pfc. Crazy Dog
- David Light as Sgt. Maddox
- Mel Davidson as Cpl. Beller
- Jim Moss as Sgt. Warden
- Tony Beso as Lol Pot
- Jerry Hart as Doctor
- David Anderson as Special Forces Officer
- Steve Rogers as Sgt. Rattner's Men

== Reception ==
Timothy Young of mondo-esoterica.net recommended it as "An action packed trashy war film that ticks almost all the necessary boxes" and called it "One for fans of low budget action and exploitation films."

Criticonline.com's review reads, "If you like war action films, EYE OF THE EAGLE is a good way to spend 82 minutes."

Eric Reifschneider of bloodbrothersfilms.com gave the film a negative review of 1/5, writing, "All aspects of this film are just downright poor, from its writing, to its editing, to its acting."
