= The Sisterhood (1988 film) =

- Theatrical poster
- Directed by: Cirio H. Santiago
- Written by: Thomas McKelvey Cleaver
- Produced by: Anna Roth
- Starring: Rebecca Holden; Chuck Wagner; Lynn-Holly Johnson; Barbara Patrick; Robert Dryer; Henry Strzalkowski; David Light; Jim Moss; Anthony East; Tom McNeeley
- Cinematography: Ricardo Remias
- Music by: Jun Latonio
- Production company: Santa Fe
- Distributed by: Concorde Pictures; Media Home Entertainment (VHS)
- Release date: January 1988
- Running time: 75 minutes
- Country: United States
- Language: English

The Sisterhood (released in the Philippines as Caged Women) is a 1988 American action/adventure/science fiction film directed by Filipino director Cirio H. Santiago.

== Plot ==
In what used to be America, several women fight to stay alive in a post-apocalyptic world, after being captured by a brutal army of men. The men are veterans of the "Western War," which occurred sometime before 2021. The army is led by Mikal (Chuck Wagner) who is world-weary and tired of fighting, but sees no alternative

With escape impossible, their only hope for rescue is a nomadic band of fierce she-warriors: The Sisterhood. Each member of the Sisterhood has a unique paranormal power, although they have lost battles to the men's forces in the past. Led by Alee (Rebecca Holden) the Sisterhood eschews mechanical weapons in favor of their paranormal abilities. The Sisterhood is able to overcome the army of men and free the captives. They reaffirm their commitment to heal the land with the use of their powers not machinery.

== Cast ==
- Rebecca Holden
- Chuck Wagner
- Lynn-Holly Johnson
- Barbara Patrick
- Robert Dryer
- Henry Strzalkowski
- David Light
- Jim Moss
- Anthony East
- Tom McNeeley

== Release ==
The Sisterhood was released in the United States in January 1988. In the Philippines, the film was released as Caged Women by Jadestar Films on June 30, 1989.

=== Reception ===
Creature Feature gave the movie 2 out of 5 stars. Others found the movie "trashy," although the acting is found to be better than average and the story is better than average

Variety said the film "breaks no new ground but includes diverting material drawn from the ““Mad Max’’ cookbook... Pic has many a similarity to other genre films, with the Sisterhood having mystical reverend mothers (a la Dune)."

The film was one of two post-apocalyptic movies made starring Chuck Wagner the other being America 3000. He later said of these, "with enough cocktails they're mildly entertaining. They're both silly, silly films."
