= Equalizer 2000 =

Film by Cirio H. Santiago

- Directed by: Cirio H. Santiago
- Screenplay by: Frederick Bailey
- Story by: Frederick Bailey; Joe Mari Avellana
- Produced by: Leonard Hermes
- Starring: Richard Norton; Corinne Wahl; William Steis; Robert Patrick
- Cinematography: Johnny Araojo
- Edited by: Pacifico Sanchez Jr.
- Production company: Concorde Pictures
- Distributed by: Concorde Pictures
- Release date: May 19, 1987 (United States)
- Running time: 87 mins
- Countries: USA; Philippines
- Language: English

Equalizer 2000 is a 1987 action film shot in the Philippines.

== Plot ==
In post-nuclear Alaska, a fascist group ("The Ownership" also featured in Wheels of Fire) battles rebels in hopes of possessing a massive weapon — the titular "Equalizer 2000", created by ex-Ownership Captain Slade who joins the rebellion to defeat Mayor Lawton. Lawton killed Slade's father (The Ownership's field commander) and he also wants to kill General MacLaine, The Ownership's leader, to be the new leader.

== Cast ==
Cast adapted from the Variety review.

- Richard Norton
- Corinne Wahl
- William Steis
- Robert Patrick
- Frederick Bailey
- Rex Cutter

== Production ==
Equalizer 2000 was shot in the Philippines.

== Release ==
The film did not receive a theatrical release in the United States. The film was released on home video by MGM/UA Home Video on May 19, 1987, in the United States.

== Reception ==
A reviewer credited as "Gerz." of Variety reviewed the MGM/UA Home Video release of the film on June 10, 1987. "Gerz." described the film as "dull" and "unoriginal" while stating the film was "a laugher from the start, since viewer will be more interested in where the protagonists got those muscular physiques, chic black leather garb and blow-dry hairdos."

From retrospective reviews, Claude Gailard wrote in his book on post-apocalyptic films that Equalizer 2000 benefits from "the talents of a muscular Richard Norton" and Robert Patrick in his second film appearance and the presence of Corinne Wahl.
