= Robert Patrick =

American actor (born 1958)

- Patrick in 2026
- Born: Robert Hammond Patrick; November 5, 1958 (age 68); Marietta, Georgia, U.S.
- Occupation: Actor
- Years active: 1983–present
- Spouse: Barbara Hooper (m. 1990)
- Children: 2
- Relatives: Richard Patrick (brother)

Robert Hammond Patrick (born November 5, 1958) is an American actor. Known for portraying villains and authority figures, Patrick is a Saturn Award winner with four other nominations.

After playing a supporting role in Die Hard 2 (1990), he came to prominence as the T-1000, the antagonist of Terminator 2: Judgment Day (1991). His other film credits include Fire in the Sky (1993), Striptease (1996), Cop Land (1997), The Faculty (1998), Spy Kids (2001), Charlie's Angels: Full Throttle (2003), Walk the Line (2005), Flags of Our Fathers (2006), Bridge to Terabithia (2007), Safe House (2012), Gangster Squad (2013), The Laundromat (2019), The Protégé (2021).

On television, Patrick portrayed lead roles such as FBI Special Agent John Doggett in The X-Files (2000–2002), Colonel Tom Ryan in The Unit (2006–2009), DHS agent Cabe Gallo in Scorpion (2014–2018), and Auggie Smith / White Dragon in Peacemaker (2022–2025). He played recurring and single-season roles in notable series like The Sopranos (2000), True Blood (2012–2014), 1923 (2022–2025), Reacher (2023–2024), and Tulsa King (2025). He also appeared as Vernon Presley in the miniseries Elvis (2005).

AllMovie journalist Tracie Cooper wrote that, by the conclusion of The X-Files in 2002, Patrick had developed a "solid reputation within the industry", with critics, fans and co-stars alike praising his "work ethic, personality, and consistent performances." Fellow actor Jason Bateman described Patrick as "one of the great heavies."

== Early life ==
Robert Hammond Patrick was born in Marietta, Georgia, on November 5, 1958, and raised there, as well as in Boston, Massachusetts; Dayton, Ohio; Detroit, Michigan; and Bay Village, Ohio. He is the eldest of five children born to Nadine and Robert M. Patrick.

Patrick did not start to pursue an acting career until his mid-twenties. During his childhood, he did not like to act. In third grade, Patrick refused to wear a pair of green tights required for Peter Pan. He graduated from Farmington High School in Farmington, Michigan in 1977. Patrick was a track and field and football athlete at Bowling Green State University. He dropped out before graduating when he found an interest in drama and acting. After leaving college, Patrick worked as a house painter and continued as such until a boating accident in 1984 in Lake Erie. He swam for three hours in order to save others still stranded on the accident site, and nearly drowned in doing so. The same year, he moved to Los Angeles, California.

== Career ==
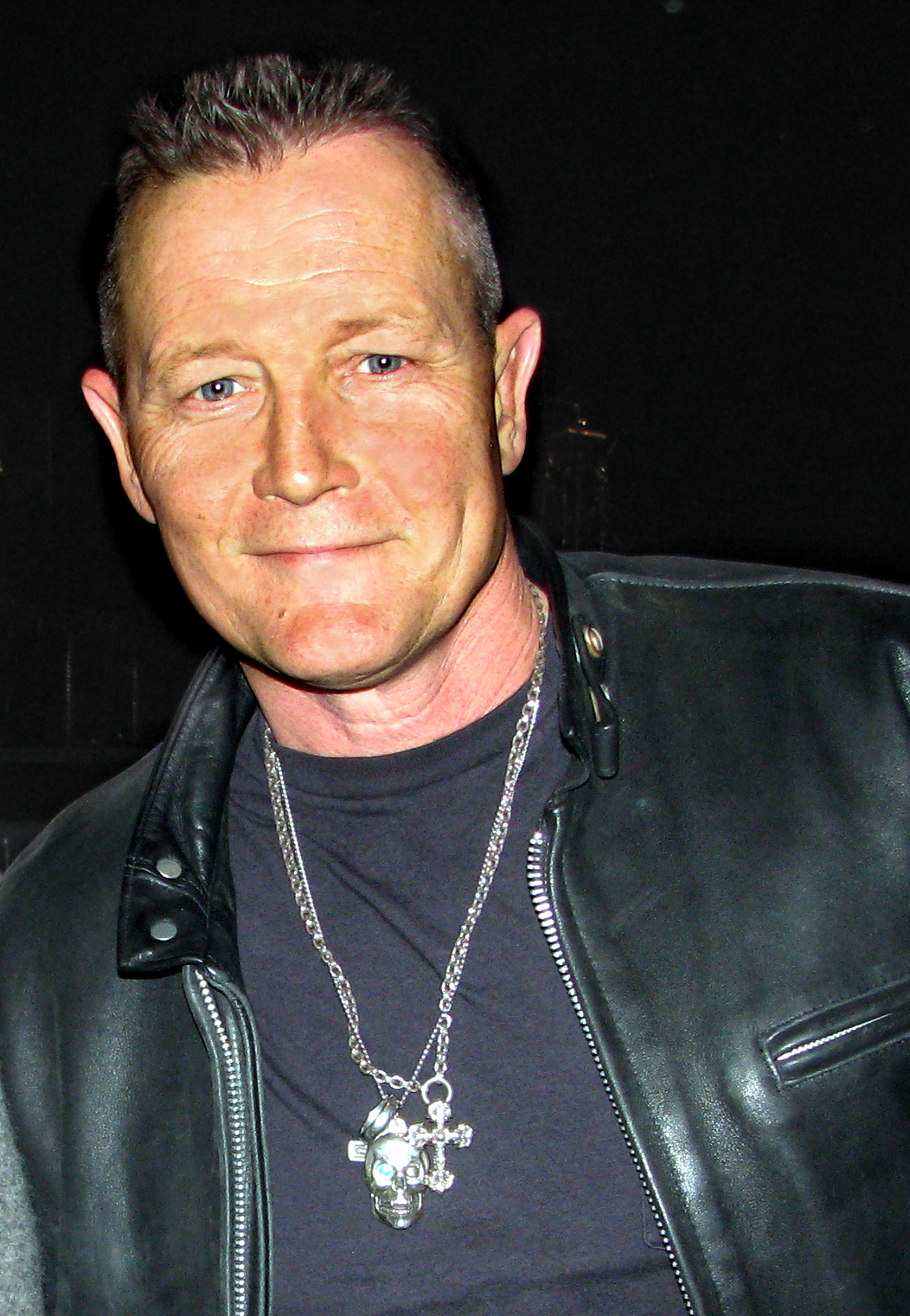
Patrick in December 2007

Patrick first appeared in several low-budget science-fiction and action films produced by Roger Corman and shot in the Philippines by Cirio H. Santiago. Looking back, he credited his early appearances in films to his "tough-looking exterior". He played leading roles in pictures such as Future Hunters (1986), Eye of the Eagle, and Equalizer 2000 (both 1987). Patrick later commented that his experience with Santiago had been his "film school". The B movies he made in the Philippines helped him get a SAG card. Patrick's first major Hollywood film was Die Hard 2 (1990), in a small part as a henchman for Colonel Stuart, before landing the role of the T-1000, the villain of James Cameron's Terminator 2: Judgment Day (1991), which proved to be his most famous and breakthrough role. Cameron said he chose Patrick because of his physical appearance, which he felt fit the role. Patrick was "broke" at the time, living in a cheap apartment with his girlfriend, Barbara, whom he married during shooting. He has credited the film with starting his career.

After Terminator 2, Patrick landed roles in various feature films such as Last Action Hero, Fire in the Sky (both 1993) and Striptease (1996). Because of his fondness for martial arts, Patrick starred in two martial arts films titled Double Dragon and Hong Kong 97, both released in 1994, and had a fight scene with taekwondo master Hwang Jang-lee in Future Hunters.

His performance in Fire in the Sky led The X-Files creator Chris Carter to cast him in that series for the role of John Doggett. Patrick's brother, Richard, had previously worked for the series by adding music for the soundtrack albums Songs in the Key of X: Music from and Inspired by the X-Files in 1996 and The X-Files: The Album in 1998. Patrick was cast as Doggett in 2000. The X-Files was canceled two seasons later, after Duchovny left the show following season 7, which resulted in low ratings for the show. Patrick made several appearances on many genre magazines, with TV Guide going so far as to label him one of the Ten Sexiest Men of Sci-Fi.

In 2000, Patrick appeared in three episodes of The Sopranos ("The Happy Wanderer", "Bust Out" and "Funhouse") as David "Davey" Scatino, a store owner struggling with gambling debts owed to Richie Aprile and Tony Soprano. Four years later, he made a guest appearance in the pilot episodes for Sci-Fi Channel's original series Stargate Atlantis, "Rising", as the military component commander of the Atlantis expedition, Marshall Sumner. He accepted the role, since he had worked with the same crew on The Outer Limits, a series which he appeared in during the early 1990s.

Patrick played Johnny Cash's father Ray Cash in the film Walk the Line and Elvis Presley's father Vernon Presley in the miniseries Elvis (both 2005). In 2003, he appeared in Charlie's Angels: Full Throttle, which reunited him with his Striptease co-star, Demi Moore. He had a regular role on The Unit, and played Elvis Presley in Lonely Street (2009). In October 2006, he starred in the WWE Films production The Marine as Rome. He also appeared in We Are Marshall as Marshall University head coach Rick Tolley, who lost his life when Southern Airways Flight 932 crashed in 1970. His credits also include a guest starring role in the Lost episode "Outlaws", as well as a recurring role as the voice of Master Piandao in season 3 of the Nickelodeon animated series Avatar: The Last Airbender. Patrick played a supporting role in Firewall, a 2006 action film starring Harrison Ford. He has also appeared in Meat Loaf's music video "Objects in the Rear View Mirror May Appear Closer than They Are" with Will Estes.

Patrick also starred in the psychological thriller The Black Water of Echo's Pond, which was directed by Italian filmmaker Gabriel Bologna. In 2012, he played against type as a shaggy show business manager in Harry Lennix's Mr. Sophistication, which is about a self-destructive stand-up comedian. From 2012 to 2013, he also starred in Last Resort as Chief of the Boat Joseph Prosser. He played a supporting character in Identity Thief (2013). Around this time, he also appeared in television series as Burn Notice, NCIS and True Blood, among others. From 2014 to 2016, he starred in Robert Rodriguez's From Dusk till Dawn: The Series as Jacob Fuller. He also played Agent Cabe Gallo on the CBS drama series Scorpion from 2014 to 2018.

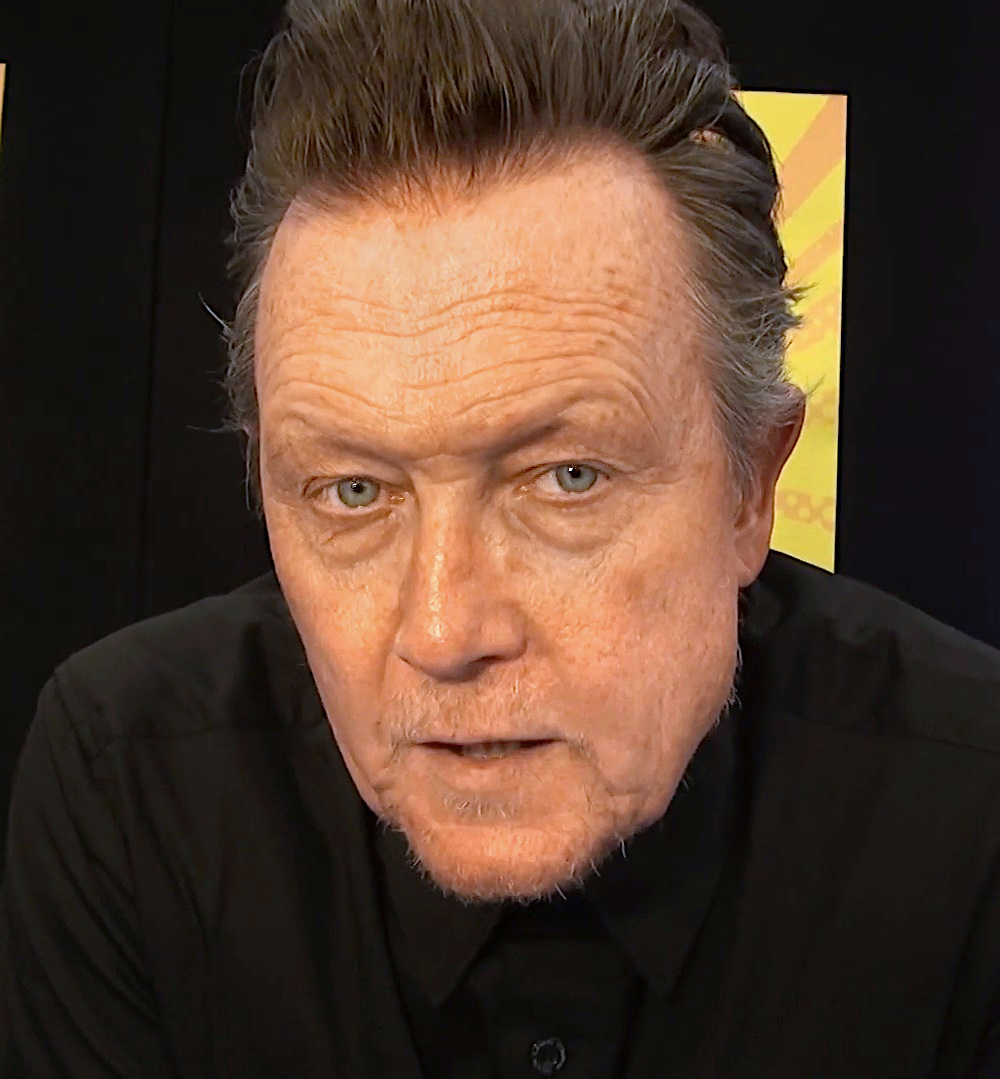
Robert Patrick at German Comic Con 2018

On March 28, 2017, Patrick was cast in Amazon Video horror anthology series Lore, which is based on the award-winning and critically acclaimed podcast of the same name. Lore recounts true stories of frightening and paranormal occurrences. Lore premiered on October 13, 2017, and ran for two seasons. In 2021, Patrick starred in Rushed, co-produced by Lars von Trier's Zentropa Entertainment, and written by Siobhan Fallon Hogan. Also starring Jake Weary and Peri Gilpin, Vertical Entertainment has acquired the distribution rights. In 2022, Patrick played August "Auggie" Smith, the racist supervillain father of Peacemaker, in the HBO Max series Peacemaker, and he voiced Wolverine in the Marvel's Wastelanders: Wolverine podcast. Patrick was cast as a powerful figure and leader of the Dixie Mafia named Jeremiah Dunmire in the Paramount+ hit series Tulsa King, on March 21, 2025. He appeared in 10 episodes during the course of season 3.

== Personal life ==
Patrick married actress Barbara Hooper in 1990. They have appeared together in various films and TV shows such as Zero Tolerance and The X-Files. They have two children: a son and a daughter. His younger brother is musician Richard Patrick, the lead vocalist and only continuous member of the rock band Filter and former touring guitarist for Nine Inch Nails.

Patrick is a devout Episcopalian. He is also a member of the Boozefighters motorcycle club.

In August 2022, Patrick revealed for the first time that he struggled with substance abuse early on in his career and how it affected his momentum of procuring different acting roles after Terminator 2.

Patrick became co-owner of Santa Clarita Harley-Davidson with Oliver Shokouh in September 2018.

== Filmography ==
=== Film ===
Year	Title	Role	Notes
1986	Future Hunters	Slade	
1987	Warlords from Hell		
1987	Eye of the Eagle	Johnny Ransom	
1987	Equalizer 2000	Deke	
1987	Killer Instinct	Johnny Ransom	
1989	Hollywood Boulevard II	Cameraman	
1990	Die Hard 2	O'Reilly	
1991	Terminator 2: Judgment Day	T-1000	
1992	Wayne's World	T-1000	Cameo
1993	Fire in the Sky	Mike Rogers	
1993	Last Action Hero	T-1000	Cameo
1993	Broken	Cop	Short film; uncredited
1994	Double Dragon	Victor Guisman / Koga Shuko	
1994	The Cool Surface	Jarvis Scott	
1994	Body Shot	Mickey Dane	
1994	Hong Kong '97	Reginald Cameron	
1994	Zero Tolerance	Jeff Douglas	
1995	Decoy	Jack Travis	
1995	Last Gasp	Leslie Chase	
1996	T2 3-D: Battle Across Time	T-1000	Universal Studios attraction
1996	Striptease	Darrell Grant	
1997	Cop Land	Officer Jack Rucker	
1997	Rosewood	Fanny's Lover	
1997	Hacks	'Goatee'	
1997	The Only Thrill	Tom McHenry	
1997	Asylum	Nicholas Tordone	
1998	The Vivero Letter	James Wheeler	
1998	Renegade Force	Jake McInroy	
1998	The Faculty	Coach Joe Willis	
1998	Tactical Assault	Colonel Lee Banning	
1999	From Dusk Till Dawn 2: Texas Blood Money	Buck Bowers	Direct-to-video
1999	A Texas Funeral	Zach	
1999	Shogun Cop	Detective	
2000	Mexico City	Ambassador Mills	
2000	All the Pretty Horses	Cole	
2001	Spy Kids	Mr. Lisp	
2001	Texas Rangers	Sergeant John Armstrong	
2001	Backflash	Ray Bennet	
2001	Angels Don't Sleep Here	Detective Russell Stark	
2002	Out of These Rooms	John Michael	
2002	Pavement	Samuel Brown	
2002	The Hire	FBI Agent	Short film; segment: Ticker; uncredited
2002	D-Tox	Peter Noah	
2003	Charlie's Angels: Full Throttle	Ray Carter	
2004	Ladder 49	Lenny Richter	
2005	Supercross	Earl Cole	
2005	Walk the Line	Ray Cash	
2005	The Fix	Shay Riley	
2006	Firewall	Gary Mitchell	
2006	The Marine	Rome	
2006	Flags of Our Fathers	Colonel Chandler Johnson	
2006	We Are Marshall	Head coach Rick Tolley	Uncredited
2007	Bridge to Terabithia	Jack Aarons	
2007	Balls of Fury	Sergeant Pete Daytona	
2008	Fly Me to the Moon	Louie	Voice
2008	Strange Wilderness	Gus Hayden	
2008	Autopsy	Dr. David Benway	
2008	Lonely Street	Mr. Aaron	
2009	Alien Trespass	Vernon	
2009	The Black Waters of Echo's Pond	Pete	
2009	The Men Who Stare at Goats	Todd Nixon	
2010	Five Minarets in New York	Becker	
2010	The Wrath of Cain	Warden Dean	
2011	S.W.A.T.: Firefight	Walter Hatch	Direct-to-video
2011	Good Day for It	Luke Cain	
2012	Safe House	CIA Agent Daniel Kiefer	
2012	Trouble with the Curve	Vince	
2012	Jayne Mansfield's Car	Jim 'Jimbo' Caldwell	
2012	Mr. Sophistication	Manager	
2012	Mafia	Jules Dupree	
2013	Gangster Squad	Officer Max Kennard	
2013	Lovelace	John Boreman	
2013	Identity Thief	Skiptracer	
2014	Endless Love	Harry Elliot	
2014	Kill the Messenger	Ronald J. Quail	
2014	The Road Within	Robert	
2014	Ask Me Anything	Doug Kampenfelt	
2015	Lost After Dark	Mr. C.	
2015	Hellions	Corman	
2015	Hollywood Adventures	Studio Guard #1 / T-1000	Cameo
2017	Eloise	Dr. H.H. Greiss	
2017	Last Rampage	Gary Tison	
2018	Edge of Fear	Jack Pryor	
2018	Back Roads	Chief Mansour	
2019	Jarhead: Law of Return	Senator Jackson	Direct-to-video
2019	Sgt. Will Gardner	Tony	
2019	The Poison Rose	Chief Bing Walsh	
2019	The Rising Hawk	Zakhar Berkut	
2019	The Laundromat	Captain Richard Paris	
2019	Tone-Deaf	Harvey	Also executive producer
2020	Honest Thief	Agent Sam Baker	
2021	No Man of God	Roger Depue	
2021	What Josiah Saw	Josiah Graham	
2021	The Protégé	Billy 'Billy Boy'	
2021	Rushed	Jim O'Brien	
2023	Dark Asset	Dr. Cain	Also executive producer
2023	Shelter in Solitude	Dwayne	
2025	Mermaid	Ron Bocca	
2026	Diamond	Main Power Broker	

=== Television ===
Year	Title	Role	Notes
1989	The New Lassie	Russ	Episode: "Once Upon a Time..."
1992	Tales from the Crypt	Lothar	Episode: "The New Arrival"
1993	SWAT Kats: The Radical Squadron	Dr. Lieter Greenbox	Voice; episode: "Chaos in Crystal"
1994	Captain Planet and the Planeteers	Professor Posey	Voice; episode: "Bug Off"
1995	Body Language	Delbert Radley	Television film
1995	Dumb and Dumber	Bee Guard / Cop	Voice; episode: "To Bee or Not to Bee"
1995–1996	The Outer Limits	Major John Skokes	Guest role; 2 episodes
1996	Superman: The Animated Series	Martin LeBeau	Voice; episode: "Feeding Time"
1996–1997	The Real Adventures of Jonny Quest	Race Bannon	Voice; main role (season 1)
1997	The Legend of Calamity Jane	John Wesley Hardin	Voice; English dub
1997	Rag and Bone	Sergeant Daniel Ryan	Television film
1998	Perfect Assassins	Leo Benita	Television film
1998	Ambushed	Shannon Herrold	Television film
1999	The Angry Beavers	Wingnut	Voice; episode: "Easy Peasy Rider"
2000	The Sopranos	David "Davey" Scatino	Recurring role; 3 episodes
2000	Batman Beyond	Richard Armacost	Voice; episode: "Big Time"
2000–2002	The X-Files	John Doggett	Main role; 41 episodes
2003	1st to Die	Nicholas Jenks	Television film
2004	Bad Apple	Colonel Tom Ryanmy "Bells" Bellavita	Television film
2004	Stargate Atlantis	Colonel Marshall Sumner	Episode: "Rising"
2005	Lost	Hibbs	Episode: "Outlaws"
2005	Duck Dodgers	J. Edgar Ashcan	Voice; episode: "Of Course You Know, This Means War and Peace: Part I"
2005	Elvis	Vernon Presley	Miniseries
2005	Law & Order: Special Victims Unit	Ray Schenkel	Episode: "Demons"
2006	Ben 10	Phil Billings	Voice; episode: "Truth"
2006–2009	The Unit	Colonel Tom Ryan	Main role; 69 episodes
2006–2009	Disorderly Conduct: Video on Patrol	Narrator	Voice
2007–2008	Avatar: The Last Airbender	Master Piandao	Voice; 2 episodes
2008	The Batman	Katar Hol / Hawkman	Voice; 2 episodes
2009	Hell's Kitchen	Himself	Red guest diner; episode: "9 Chefs Compete"
2009	American Dad!	Stranger	Voice; episode: "In Country...Club"
2009	NCIS	Colonel Merton Bell	Episode: "Outlaws and In-Laws"
2010	Psych	Major General Felts	Episode: "You Can't Handle This Episode"
2010	Chuck	Colonel Keller	Episode: "Chuck Versus the Tic Tac"
2010	Burn Notice	John Barrett	Guest role; 2 episodes
2011	Big Love	Bud Mayberry	Guest role; 2 episodes
2011	Red Faction: Origins	Alec Mason	Television film
2012	Last Resort	Command Master Chief Petty Officer Joseph Prosser	Main role; 13 episodes
2012–2014	True Blood	Jackson Herveaux	Recurring role; 12 episodes
2013–2014	Sons of Anarchy	President Les Packer	Guest role; 2 episodes (seasons 6–7)
2014	Community	Head of Parking Waldron	Episode: "Analysis of Cork-Based Networking"
2014	From Dusk till Dawn: The Series	Jacob Fuller	Main cast (season 1); 10 episodes
2014–2018	Scorpion	Agent Cabe Gallo	Main role; 93 episodes
2015	Ultimate Spider-Man	Robert Frank / Whizzer	Voice; episode: "S.H.I.E.L.D. Academy"
2017	Lore	Reverend Eliakim Phelps	Episode: "Passing Notes"
2018–2019	Mayans M.C.	President Les Packer	2 episodes
2020	Perry Mason	Herman Baggerly	Recurring role
2021	The Walking Dead	Mays	Episode: "One More"
2021	MacGyver	Ian Cain	Episode: "SOS + Hazmat + Ultrasound + Frequency + Malihini"
2021	Goliath	Coach (Billy's Father)	Recurring role; 4 episodes
2022–2025	Peacemaker	Auggie Smith / White Dragon / Blue Dragon	Main role
2022–2025	1923	Sheriff William McDowell	Recurring role
2023	Praise Petey	Various	Voice; 2 episodes
2023–2024	Reacher	Shane Langston	Main role (Season 2)
2023–2025	The Night Agent	Hawkins	3 episodes
2025	Tulsa King	Jeremiah Dunmire	Main role (season 3); 10 episodes

=== Video games ===
Year	Title	Role	Notes
1992	Terminator 2: Judgment Day: The Video Game	T-1000	Voice and performance capture
1995	The Dig	Commander Boston Low	Voice
2006	The Outfit	'Deuce' Williams	Voice
2013	LocoCycle	S.P.I.K.E.	Voice
2020	Madden NFL 21	Coach Red O'Brien	Voice and model
2025	Mortal Kombat 1	T-1000	Voice and model

== Awards and nominations ==
Year	Award	Category	Work	Result
1992	MTV Movie Awards	Best Villain	Terminator 2: Judgment Day	Nominated
1992	Saturn Awards	Best Supporting Actor	Terminator 2: Judgment Day	Nominated
1994	Saturn Awards	Best Actor	Fire in the Sky	Nominated
2001	Saturn Awards	Best Actor on Television	The X-Files	Won
2002	Saturn Awards	Best Actor on Television	The X-Files	Nominated
2005	Jury Awards	Best Actor	The Fix	Won
