= Naked Vengeance =

- VHS cover art
- Directed by: Cirio H. Santiago
- Screenplay by: Jim Lenahan (as Reilly Askew); Anthony Maharaj (story)
- Based on: I Spit On Your Grave by Meir Zarchi
- Produced by: Anthony Maharaj; Cirio H. Santiago
- Starring: Deborah Tranelli; Kaz Garas; Carmen Argenziano; Nick Nicholson
- Cinematography: Ricardo Remias
- Edited by: Noah Blough; Pacifico Sanchez
- Music by: Michael Cruz; Ron Jones
- Production companies: Westbrook / M.P. Films; D.S. Pictures
- Distributed by: Concorde Pictures; Lightning Video
- Release date: October 1985
- Running time: 76 minutes; (97 minutes unrated version)
- Country: United States
- Language: English

Naked Vengeance is a 1985 exploitation rape and revenge film directed by Cirio Santiago. The film features Deborah Tranelli as its protagonist, actress-turned-vigilante Carla Harris. The film has since received a cult following and is often mentioned in works discussing films of the rape and revenge genre.

== Plot ==
Carla Harris is living the American dream. She has a handsome and wealthy husband, Mark. On their way home from a restaurant, they spot a man attacking a woman. Mark tries to help but is killed. The man escapes when the police arrive. Russo, an officer, goes to her house and tells her that there are no witnesses. Russo says that he will contact her if they find anything.

On the way to her parents' house, Carla stops at a gas station where she sees her old boyfriend Burke and one of Burke's friends, Sparky. Later that night, Carla goes to a club and meets her old high school friends, her best friend Estelle and her husband Slob. After being accosted by Fletch, the local butcher, Carla goes home. While she is changing, she notices Timmy, the gardener spying on her. Later that night, a gang of six men break into her house and brutally gang rape her. When her parents return, Burke grabs Mr. Harris's shotgun and kills them, as well as Timmy.

Meanwhile, in the hospital, Carla wakes up and tells the doctor that she wants revenge. Later that night, she escapes from the hospital. She goes to the closed bar and seduces the bartender, Ray. She steals his gun, forces him to pour wine all over his body, then throws a candle at him, leaving him to burn. The next day, Carla finds Burke in his speedboat. She grabs a knife on the boat and stabs him. She then takes a grapple and throws it through his chest. She ties the other end to his boat and starts the boat, making him drown, and then escapes. Carla then sneaks to Sparky's gas station. While Sparky is working on a car, Carla drops the car on him, killing him. Later that night, Carla goes to Arnie's ice company. Carla pushes Arnie in the ice cube maker. A block of ice pushes him in the cube hole, leaving him to die.

Carla goes to the ice truck when Fletch, the gang and some town locals spot her and chase her to her parents' house. Carla blocks the doors and hides in a corner. The men start to burn the house down, but Carla goes into the basement and escapes through a vent. When the Sheriff asks Fletch about the burning, he falsely claims he knew nothing about it. Later that night, Fletch is alone in the butcher shop. Carla arrives and the two fight. Carla finds the shotgun that Fletch used to kill her family and kills him with it.

Two months later, in New York, Carla finds the man who killed her husband. She seduces him, then grabs his gun and shoots him. She then walks away in tears.

== Cast ==
- Deborah Tranelli as Carla Harris
- Kaz Garas as Fletch
- Rosemarie Gil as Jesse
- Carmen Argenziano as Detective Russo
- Nick Nicholson as Sparky
- Terrence O'Hara as Mark Harris
- Bill McLaughlin as Sheriff John Cates
- Ed Crick as Burke
- Don Gordon Bell as Arnie
- David Light as Ray
- Steve Roderick as Timmy
- Joseph Zucchero as Dr. Fellows
- Helen McNeely as Mrs. Olson
- Doc McCoy as Mr. Olson
- Henry Strzalkowski as Deputy Frank Winston
- Barbara Peers as Estelle
- George E. Mahlberg as George Butch
- Bill Kip as Deputy Reilly

== Production ==
The film, a Westbook Brooks production in association with D.S., was directed by Cirio H. Santiago and was shot in Los Angeles (city scenes) New York City (street scenes) and the Philippines. Some scenes from the Philippine shoot took place in a large residential subdivision south of Manila known as Parañaque Banco Filipino Homes, along Aguirre and President's Avenues. The screenplay was written by Jim Lenahan based on a story by Anthony Maharaj. While the film has been frequently thought of as an unofficial remake of Meir Zarchi's I Spit on Your Grave (1978) since both movies share a similar storyline, this claim has neither been refuted nor acknowledged.

Deborah Tranelli, best known for her longtime role in the soap opera Dallas, was cast as the lead character and protagonist, actress-turned-vigilante Carla Harris. Not having a stunt double, Tranelli did her own action exploits. The theme song was performed by her as well. Kaz Garas, Rosemarie Gil, Ed Crick, Nick Nicholson and Terrence O'Hara also star in the film, while Carmen Argenziano has a cameo appearance as a detective.

== Reception ==
In his short review for the Sydney Morning Herald, David Frith described the character Harris as "a sort of female Charles Bronson, wreaking bloody revenge on male hoodlums." In analysing the film in his work Screening the Male: Exploring Masculinities in the Hollywood Cinema, Steve Cohan compares it with I Spit On Your Grave and postulates that the film's castration scene is a partial representation of "a male death wish". He adds that "there is no doubt that the audience is intended to enjoy his save punishment". A similar conclusion is made in Introduction to Film Studies, in which author Jill Nelmes argues that Species samples elements from Naked Vengeance and I Spit On Your Grave, whereas Annette Kuhn likens it to Violated (1984) and Shame (1987).

The magazine Critical Condition (which focuses on "obscure & bizarre films on video and DVD") described Naked Vengeance as " a perfectly crazy rip-off of I Spit on Your Grave (1978), maybe even outdoing it in sheer sleaze factor alone," and judges it to be Santiago's "crowning achievement". The website AllMovie notes that the film "obviously takes its inspiration from I Spit On Your Grave", but added that the film "is likely to amuse exploitation fans" due to it going to lengths to be more outrageous than its predecessor and becoming a self-parody by being overt in presentation of the heroine enduring a brutal rape and then having to witness her own parents being killed in front of her resulting in her seeking revenge. The reviewer cautioned viewers and concluded, "The end result is as subtle as a flying mallet and ragged in both the acting and technical departments but Deborah Tranelli delivers a brave, surprisingly strong performance as the beleaguered heroine and the film uses that performance to its benefit by having her in the majority of its scenes. To sum up, Naked Vengeance might be derivative schlock but it has a certain crude effectiveness that will appeal to grindhouse fans."

Using a methodology that polls viewers to measure their "satisfaction" with the picture, HBO's Guide to Movies on Videocassette and Cable TV gave this film a four-star rating.
