= Fly Me =

1973 film by Cirio H. Santiago

- Directed by: Cirio H. Santiago
- Produced by: Roger Corman
- Starring: Pat Anderson; Lenore Kasdorf; Lyllah Torena; Naomi Stevens
- Distributed by: New World Pictures
- Release date: 1973
- Running time: 72 minutes

Fly Me is a 1973 exploitation film directed by Cirio H. Santiago and produced by Roger Corman. The story concerns flight attendants, international drug smuggling, kung fu, and nudity. It was poorly received by critics.

== Plot ==
Toby, Andrea, and Sherry are stewardesses working a flight from Los Angeles to Hong Kong.

Toby was surprised on the flight by her "typically overbearing Italian mother", and is trying to ditch her in Hong Kong to instead spend time with David (a young doctor). Unknown to Andrea, her lover—Donald—leads a white slavery and drug trafficking ring in Hong Kong; Sherry was one of his smugglers, but he has kidnapped her for withholding some of the product, as well as Toby and her mother.

Andrea and a local narcotics agent (Len) confront Donald in his nightclub, while David works to free the other three women. In short: three stewardesses fight against kung fu killers.

== Cast ==
- Pat Anderson as Toby
- Lenore Kasdorf as Andrea
- Lyllah Torena as Sherry
- Naomi Stevens as Toby's mother
- Richard Young as David
- Dick Miller as Los Angeles cab driver
- Vic Diaz as Enriquez
- Ken Metcalfe as Donald

== Production ==
Fly Me was written by Miller Drake and directed by Cirio H. Santiago. The film's kung fu sequences were choreographed by David Chow, and filmed by Jonathan Demme.

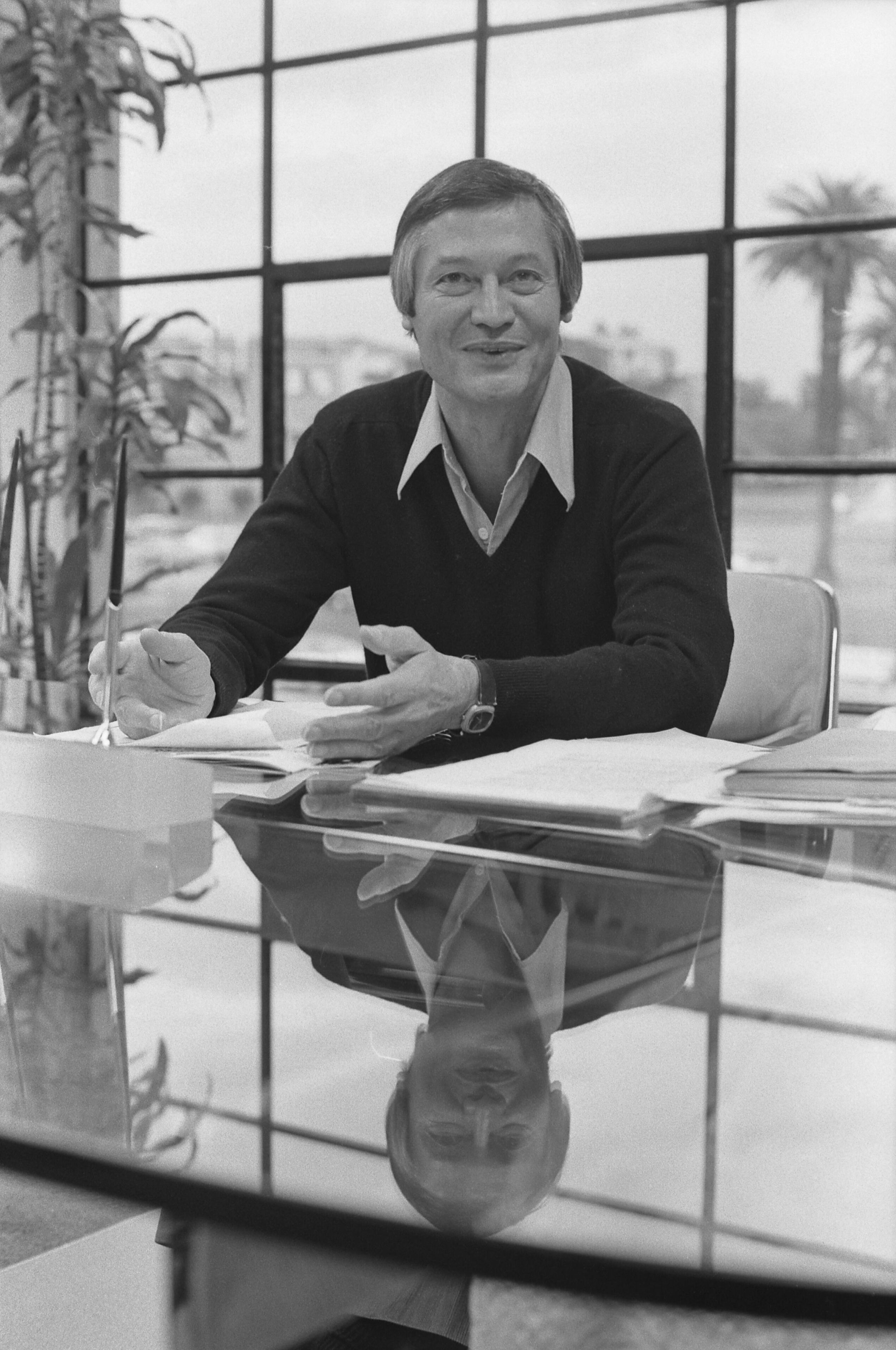
Roger Corman in 1978

Producer Roger Corman described the film as having "a somewhat pro-women's-lib viewpoint", something that was actually a bait-and-switch on the audience: while it was marketed on the merits of action, humor, and sexual content, Corman said that Fly Me instead promoted women and was "a better film" for it. He said that women's organizations and magazines were surprised at the film's quality and pro-women message.

The film was shot in the Philippines. Corman wanted to credibly set the film in Los Angeles, so he hired Curtis Hanson to film the opening scene in that city, stipulating the inclusion of nudity. With only one day to shoot, Hanson staged a scene where Anderson's character is late leaving for Los Angeles International Airport: she runs from her apartment into a taxi (driven by Dick Miller) and changes into her uniform in the back seat of the car, almost causing the distracted driver to crash.

== Release ==
Fly Me was the first of four New World Pictures films released in summer 1973; it runs 72.25 minutes long. In the United Kingdom, Fly Me was released on December 22, 1985, by Media Perpetuity Investments; it ran 74 minutes long.

== Reception ==
Christopher Koetting wrote in 2009 that Santiago eschewed all of the thematic qualities that New World had previously put into their nurses-themed films—left-wing political subplots and "attempts at style"—instead cramming in as much sex and violence as the Motion Picture Association of America's R rating would allow. He called it "one of New World's all-time worst."

In 2012, critic Rich Rosell wrote at DVD Talk that although the film "is fairly awful it is still fun in its own high camp kind of way," that it is "loaded with unintentionally funny chop-socky fight scenes balanced out by obligatory attractive female nekkidness," and that "it has a silly, low-rent charm despite the abundant imperfections."

Writing for Slant in 2012, critic Budd Wilkins described the exploitation film as "rife with wooden acting, knowingly awful dialogue, and plenty of kung-fu action," that the editing was "lousy [...] as though the film had been cut with a blunt machete and some Super Glue, which the editor was doubtless huffing," and "the fights look to have been choreographed like a game of Blind Man’s Bluff."

Filmink called it "the worst New World three girls movie of them all. The plots are dumb, the women have no camaraderie, and it is unforgivable that one of them is a baddie... the girls have to be rescued by a man (the doctor) instead of getting out of trouble themselves, too much nudity is tied up with sexual assault. The best thing about the movie is Pat Anderson, who at least later got a film worthy of her in Summer School Teachers."
