= Cirio H. Santiago =

Filipino film producer, director and writer (1936–2008)

- Santiago photographed on August 13, 2007 at the Cinemanila festival
- Born: January 18, 1936; Divisoria, Metro Manila, Commonwealth of the Philippines
- Died: September 26, 2008 (aged 72); Makati, Metro Manila, Philippines
- Education: Ateneo de Manila University
- Occupations: Film director; producer; screenwriter
- Years active: 1952–2008
- Spouse: Annabelle Raymond (m. 1959)
- Honours: The Outstanding Young Men of the Philippines Award (Film Industry, 1960); Film Academy of the Philippines Manuel de Leon Award (posthumous)

Cirio Hermoso Santiago (January 18, 1936 – September 26, 2008) was a Filipino film producer, director and writer. He used the screen names Cirio Santiago, Cirio H. Santiago, Leonardo Hermoso, and Leonard Hermes.

== Life and career ==
Santiago was born on January 18, 1936, in Manila, Philippines to Dr. Ciriaco Santiago, the founder of Manila's Premiere Productions, and his wife Adela Hermoso. He had two siblings, Danilo H. Santiago and Digna H. Santiago. He majored in Economics and Marketing at the Ateneo de Manila University.

After starting out as a movie trailer editor and later as a producer of dozens of local films in Tagalog for his father's studio in the 1950s and 1960s, he went on writing scripts for such notable films as National Artist Gerardo de Leons award-winning Ifugao (1954). Working intensively with de Leon and acclaimed director Eddie Romero on many projects motivated him to finally take over director's chores. His first directorial work was the film Paltik (1955) which went on to be nominated for Best Picture at the 1956 FAMAS Awards.

Early on, Santiago recognized the potential of producing films for the international market, cast with international actors. The war drama Cavalry Command (1958), which was shot in English, was his first attempt. However, it would be several years before he was able to establish himself in international productions. His breakthrough came with his collaboration with prolific B-movie producer Roger Corman, who was endorsed to him by the U.S. embassy in Manila. For Corman's New World Pictures, Santiago initially served as production supervisor on hits like Big Doll House (1971) with Pam Grier. His first credit as a director for Corman was Savage! (1973) for which he was paid 3,000 USD. The strong business relationship between Corman and Santiago grew into a close friendship over the years. Santiago even became the godfather of Corman's children.

Many more productions for Corman and other U.S. production companies followed soon after including Blaxploitation classics such as TNT Jackson (1975), The Muthers (1976) and Death Force (1978). By the 1980s, Santiago was almost working exclusively on international productions of various genres. A particularly fruitful period was his 3 picture collaboration with West Indian film distributor Anthony Maharaj, during which Santiago often had larger budgets at his disposal resulting in significantly better production values. These films include the First Blood rip-off Final Mission (1984) or the rape-revenge drama Naked Vengeance (1985) that both enjoyed a worldwide theatrical release.

His later career was dominated by war films such as Eye of the Eagle (1987) with Robert Patrick, Firehawk (1993), martial arts action such as Bloodfist (1989, producer), and post-apocalyptic thrillers such as Dune Warriors (1991) with David Carradine, made directly for video. At that time, his output sometimes peaked at four releases a year. In the late 1990s, with the decline of the video store era, his output dwindled. His final credit is Water Wars (2014). Santiago was forced to leave the set after only three days of shooting and was admitted to the hospital where he died soon after. Jim Wynorski stepped in to finish the project.

Over time, Santiago has had the opportunity to work with numerous American directors, notably Jonathan Demme, Joe Dante, Curtis Hanson, Carl Franklin, Katt Shea, Todd Field, and Terrence O'Hara.

"Cirio taught me a lot about fast paced filmmaking which served me well in my future career as a director. And how to shoot things really quickly - but with style."

— Terrence O'Hara

He also helped kickstarting the career of many international actors.

"Working with Cirio was my film school. And it’s because of those B-films that I finally found an agent and got my SAG card."

— Robert Patrick

== Directing style ==
Santiago was a resourceful, prolific B-movie filmmaker: he could turn limited budgets into fast-paced, visually energetic genre films, taking advantage of the low wages and wide variety of attractive filming locations in the Philippines — from the desert to the jungle.

He wasn’t aiming for polished, high-prestige filmmaking, and many of his movies come across as rough or knowingly exploitive. Nevertheless, Santiago's works often look considerably better than their modest budgets would suggest and stand out from the heap of cheaply produced B-movies of that era thanks to their craftsmanship.

His direction was technically competent, and despite the utilitarian nature often associated with exploitation films, Santiago still made a point of incorporating occasional artistically ambitious shots, camera angles, or creative match cuts to make his films visually compelling; some of these were discussed in the context of scholarly film analysis. Many actors and crew members praised his playful and lighthearted approach to filmmaking.

== Other activities ==
From 1986 to 2001, Santiago held the role of Chairman of the Film Development Foundation of the Philippines. At the time of his death he was also chairman of the Laguna Lake Development Authority.

== Death ==
Santiago died September 26, 2008, in Makati from lung cancer. He left behind his wife Annabelle and his children Christopher, Cathy, Claudine, and Cirio Jr. His third son Cyril died just a few months earlier.

Actress Jean Bell who played the lead in Santiago's TNT Jackson (1975) and The Muthers (1976), remembered him in an interview for Quentin Tarantino's New Beverly Cinema after learning of his death:

"Cirio Santiago was a very professional man, and lotta personality, patient, and a family man. I would sit next to him by the camera, and he would explain to me how this scene is going to work, this amazing creative person, I learned so much from him. I thought some day that I want be a director, he made it look so easy. RIP my friend."

— Jean Bell

== Legacy ==
Quentin Tarantino counts Santiago among his influences. He owns an extensive collection of Santiago movies and based some of the characters in Kill Bill on Santiago's Death Force (1978).

According to David Renske in his Santiago biography, Santiago met Steven Spielberg in his mother's Los Angeles restaurant "The Milky Way" expecting Spielberg wanting to collaborate with him on a project. To Santiago's astonishment, Spielberg merely inquired whether Nam Angels (1989) had really only cost 400,000 USD. Spielberg did, however, offer the film's leading man, Brad Johnson, a considerable role in his romantic drama Always (1989).

== Awards and nominations ==
Year	Award giving body	Category	Nominated work	Results
1955	Southeast Asian Film Festival (AFF) Awards	Best Screenwriter	"Ifugao"	Won
1959	FAMAS Awards	Best Director	"Water Lily"	Nominated
1959	FAMAS Awards	Best Director	"Laban sa Lahat"	Nominated
1962	FAMAS Awards	Best Director	"Mga Yapak na Walang Bakas"	Nominated
2009	Luna Awards	Manuel de Leon Award for Exemplary Achievements	(posthumous)	Won
2023	FilAm Creative Film Festival	Legendary Award	(posthumous)	Won

== Filmography ==
=== Producer ===
- Solitaryo (1953) (producer)
- Palahamak (1955) (producer)
- Minera (1955) (producer)
- Pangako ng puso (1955) (producer)
- Pandanggo ni Neneng (1955) (producer)
- Prinsipe Alejandre at Don Luis (1957) (producer)
- Tokyo 1960 (1957) (producer)
- Pepeng Kaliwete (1958) (producer)
- Water Lily (1958) (producer)
- Cavalry Command (1963) (producer) or The Day of the Trumpet
- The Big Show (1963) (producer)
- Man on the Run (1964) (producer) or The Kidnappers
- The Blood Drinkers (1964) (producer)
- Hong Kong 999 (1965) (producer)
- Captain Barbell kontra Captain Bakal (1965) (producer)
- 7 Mukha ni Dr. Ivan (1965) (producer)
- Hanapin si Leo Baron (1965) (producer)
- 7 gabi sa Hong Kong (1966) (producer)
- Kulay Dugo ang Gabi (1966) (producer) or The Blood Drinkers (USA) or The Vampire People (USA)
- Marko aintado (1967) (producer)
- El Pinoy Matador (1970) (producer)
- The Arizona Kid (1970) (producer) or Fratelli di Arizona, I (Italy)
- The Big Doll House (1971) (producer) or Bamboo Dolls House or Women’s Penitentiary or Women’s Penitentiary III (USA: changed title)
- Ang uliran (1971) (producer)
- Women in Cages (1971) (producer) or Women’s Penitentiary III
- The Hot Box (1972) (producer) or Hell Cats (UK)
- The Big Bird Cage (1972) (producer) or Women’s Penitentiary II
- Fly Me (1973) (producer)
- Savage! (1973) (producer) or Black Valor
- South Seas (1974) (producer) or South Seas Massacre (Australia)
- Bamboo Gods and Iron Men (1974) (producer) or Black Kung Fu (USA)
- Lollipops and Roses at Burong Talangka (1975) (producer)
- TNT Jackson (1975) (producer)
- Cover Girl Models (1975) (producer)
- Call Me Direnz! (1976) (producer)
- Hustler Squad (1976) (producer)
- Ebony, Ivory & Jade (1976) or She-Devils in Chains, American Beauty Hostages, Foxfire, or Foxforce
- The Muthers (1976) (producer)
- Once a Moth (1976) (executive producer)
- Tinimbang ka, bakit husto? (1977) (producer)
- Hell Hole (1978) or Escape from Women’s Hell Hole (USA) or Women of Hell’s Island (executive producer)
- Modelong Tanso (1979) (producer)
- Up from the Depths (1979) (producer)
- Firecracker (1981) (executive producer) or Naked Fist
- Stryker (1983) (producer) or Savage Dawn
- PX (1984) (executive producer)
- Final Mission (1984) (producer) or Last Mission
- The Devastator (1985) (producer) or Kings Ransom or The Destroyers
- Wheels of Fire (1985) (producer) or Desert Warrior or Pyro or Vindicator
- Naked Vengeance (1985) (producer) or Satin Vengeance
- Silk (1986) (producer) or Silk: Lady Dynamite (Philippines)
- Eye of the Eagle (1987) (producer)
- Equalizer 2000 (1987) (producer)
- Fast Gun (1987) (producer)
- Demon of Paradise (1987) (producer)
- Spyder (1988) (executive producer)
- Silk 2 (1989) (producer)
- Eye of the Eagle 2: Inside the Enemy (1989) (producer) or KIA
- Bloodfist (1989) (producer)
- Terror in Paradise (1990) (producer)
- Dune Warriors (1990) (producer)
- Bloodfist II (1990) (producer)
- Raiders of the Sun (1992) (producer)
- Beyond the Call of Duty (1992) (producer)
- Blackbelt (1992) (producer) or Black Belt
- Live by the Fist (1993) (producer)
- Kill Zone (1993) (producer)
- Firehawk (1993) (V) (producer)
- Blackbelt II (1993) (producer) or Blackbelt II: Fatal Force
- Angelfist (1993) (producer)
- Ultimatum (1994) (producer)
- Stranglehold (1994) (producer)
- One Man Army (1994) (producer) or Kick & Fury
- Caged Heat II: Stripped of Freedom (1994) (producer)
- Angel of Destruction (1994) (producer) or Furious Angel
- Terminal Virus (1995) (TV) (producer) or Last Chance
- Aringkingking: Ang Bodyguard Kong Sexy (1996) (executive producer)
- Robo Warriors (1996) (executive producer)
- To Saudi with Love (1997) (executive producer)
- Vulcan (1997) (producer)
- Kadre (1997) (executive producer)
- Damong Ligaw (1997) (executive producer)
- Anak Ng Bulkan (1997) (producer)
- Ama Namin (1998) (executive producer)
- Vital Parts (2001) (producer) or Harold Robbins’ Body Parts (USA)
- Captain Barbell (2003) (executive producer)
- Operation Balikatan (2003) (producer)
- When Eagles Strike (2004) (producer)
- Bloodfist 2050 (2005) (producer - as Leonard Hermes)
- The Hunt for Eagle One (2006) (co-producer)
- The Hunt for Eagle One: Crash Point (2006) (co-producer)

=== Director ===
- Paltik (1954)
- 4 Na Kasaysayang Ginto ("30 Sandali" segment, 1956)
- Bicol Express (fourth segment, 1957)
- Pusakal (1957)
- Pepeng Kaliwete (1958)
- Water Lily (1958)
- Laban sa Lahat (1958)
- Pusang Itim (1958)
- Ultimatum (1959)
- Hawaiian Boy (1959)
- Sandakot Na Alabok (1960)
- Pautang ng Langit (1960)
- Pagsapit ng Hatinggabi (fourth segment, 1960)
- Sa Ibabaw ng Aking Bangkay (1960)
- Konsiyerto ng Kamatayan ("Lumuluhang Bangkay" segment, 1961)
- Nagbabagang Lupa (1961)
- Pitong Gabi sa Paris (1961)
- Mga Yapak na Walang Bakas (1961)
- Walang Susuko (1962)
- Masikip ang Daigdig (1962)
- Leon Marahas (1962)
- The Big Show (1963)
- Sa Pagitan ng Dalawang Mata (1963)
- Los Palikeros (1963)
- Magnong Mandurukot (1963)
- Ging (1964)
- Duwag ang Sumuko (1964)
- Lagalag (1964)
- Bakas ng Dragon (1964)
- Saan Man Sulok ng Daigdig (1964)
- Scorpio (1964)
- Kaaway Bilang Uno (1965)
- Darna at ang Babaing Tuod (1965) or Darna and the Tree Monster
- 7 Mukha ni Dr. Ivan (1965)
- Hanapin si Leo Baron (1965)
- Pistolero (1966)
- Kardong Kaliwa (1966)
- Wanted: Johnny L (with Cesar J. Amigo, Teodorico C. Santos, Gerardo de Leon and Eddie Romero, 1966)
- Room 69 (with Gerardo de Leon, 1966)
- Tiagong Lundag (1966)
- Ang Limbas at ang Lawin (1967)
- Bravados (1967)
- Marko Aintado (1967)
- Alamid (Agent 777) (1967)
- Operation: Impossible (1967)
- Panagupa (1969)
- Lollipops and Roses (1971)
- Once Upon a Time (with Zenaida Amador, 1971)
- Fly Me (1973)
- Savage! (1973) or Black Valor
- El Negro (1974)
- Fe, Esperanza, Caridad (with Lamberto V. Avellana and Gerardo de Leon, 1974)
- TNT Jackson or Dynamite Wong and TNT Jackson (1974)
- Carnival Song (1974)
- Happy Days Are Here Again (1974)
- Cover Girl Models (1975)
- Call Me Direnz! (1976)
- Ebony, Ivory & Jade (1976) or She-Devils in Chains, American Beauty Hostages, Foxfire, or Foxforce
- The Muthers (1976)
- Doble Kara (1978)
- Hell Hole (1978) or Escape from Women’s Hell Hole (USA) or Women of Hell’s Island
- Vampire Hookers (1978)
- Death Force (1978)
- Modelong Tanso (1979)
- Gabi ng Lagim Ngayon (1980)
- Ang Galing-Galing Mo, Mrs. Jones (1980)
- Firecracker (1981) or Naked Fist
- Stryker (1983) or Savage Dawn (video title)
- Caged Fury (1983)
- Final Mission (1984) or Last Mission
- The Devastator (1985) or Kings Ransom or The Destroyers
- Wheels of Fire (1985) or Desert Warrior or Pyro or Vindicator
- Naked Vengeance (1985) or Satin Vengeance
- Silk (1986) detective drama.
- Future Hunters (1986) or Deadly Quest or Spear of Destiny
- Eye of the Eagle (1987)
- Equalizer 2000 (1987)
- Killer Instinct (1987) or Behind Enemy Lines (USA)
- Fast Gun (1987)
- Demon of Paradise (1987)
- The Sisterhood (1988)
- The Expendables (1988)
- Silk 2 (1989)
- Nam Angels (1989)
- Last Stand at Lang Mei (1990) or Eye of the Eagle 3
- Dune Warriors (1990)
- Field of Fire (1991)
- Raiders of the Sun (1992)
- Beyond the Call of Duty (1992)
- Live by the Fist (1993)
- Kill Zone (1993)
- Firehawk (1993) (V)
- Angelfist (1993)
- Ultimatum (1994)
- Stranglehold (1994)
- One Man Army (1994) or Kick & Fury
- Caged Heat II: Stripped of Freedom (1994) or Caged Heat 2: Stripped of Freedom (USA) or Prisoners
- Rexur (1995) (as Leonardo Hermoso)
- Vulcan (1997)
- Nagmumurang Kamatis (1997)
- Anak ng Bulkan (1997)
- Aladdin and the Adventure of All Time (1999)
- Operation Balikatan (2003)
- Bloodfist 2050 (2005) (as Leonard Hermes)
- Water Wars (2014) (completed by Jim Wynorski)

=== Writer ===
- 10th Battalion Sa 38th Parallel, Korea (1951) (story)
- Guerrero (1955) (story)
- Pusang itim (1958) (story)
- Anak ng bulkan (1959) (story)
- Ang matapang lamang (1959) (story)
- Hong Kong 999 (1965) (story)
- Dalawang Lahi, Isang Dugo (1965) (story)
- Kardong Kaliwa (1966) (story)
- Bravados (1967) (story)
- Impossible Dream (1973) (story)
- Call Me Direnz! (1976) (as Leonard Hermes)
- The Muthers (1976) (story - as Leonard Hermes)
- Death Force (1978) (story)
- Hell Hole (1978) or Escape from Women’s Hell Hole (USA) or Women of Hell’s Island
- Firecracker (1981) or Naked Fist
- Stryker (1983) (story - as Leonard Hermes)
- Silk (1986) (story)
- Ultimatum (1994) (as Leonardo Hermoso)
- Vulcan (1997) (story)
- Anak ng Bulkan (1997) (story)
- Home Alone da Riber (2002) (concept)
- Operation Balikatan (2003) (story)
