= Gervacio Santos =

Filipino film editor

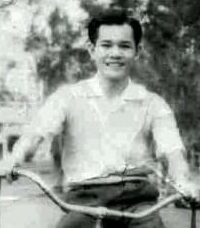
- (A photo of young Gervacio Santos)
- Born: Gervacio Santos; June 19, 1927
- Died: September 13, 2024 (aged 97); Toronto, Canada
- Occupation: Film Editor
- Years active: 1954–1989
- Spouse: Aurora (m. 1956)
- Children: 5
- Awards: Gervacio Santos at IMDb

Gervacio Santos is a Filipino film editor. Throughout his career, he was recognized as one of the most esteemed professional film editors in his field and one of the most sought after in the industry.

Gervacio Santos, a highly skilled Filipino film editor, has earned numerous accolades throughout his distinguished career. He won several awards for Best Film Editing, including prestigious recognitions at both the Metro Manila Film Festival and the Quezon City Film Festival. His editing work on Remembrance (a notable entry in the Metro Manila Film Festival) and Alyas Bagsik (which earned him acclaim at the Quezon City Film Festival) further established him as one of the finest editors in the Philippine film industry.

Additionally, Santos was honored by the Filipino Academy of Movie Arts and Sciences (FAMAS) with three awards for his exceptional editing contributions to the films Kalibre 45 (1957), Cavalry Command (1963), and Scout Rangers (1964). His expertise in editing not only enhanced the pacing and narrative flow of these films but also elevated the overall quality of Filipino cinema. Santos' impact on the industry goes beyond editing, as he played a vital role in shaping the technical standards of local films and is regarded as a significant figure in the development of the Philippine film industry.

== Career ==
Santos began his professional career as an editor in 1954 at Premiere Productions, one of the well-known film studios in the Philippines at the time, where he was entrusted with editing Conde de Monte Carlo, a notable film starring renowned actor Rogelio de la Rosa. This opportunity was a significant turning point in his career, as it allowed him to demonstrate his editing expertise on a high-profile project. "Conde de Monte Carlo", which was well-received at the time, helped establish Santos' reputation within the film industry. Over the years, his work would continue to garner recognition, leading to further opportunities in both editing and other key roles in the Filipino film industry.

Santos also collaborated with Premiere Productions on Si Eva at si Adan. Si Eva at si Adan (translated as "Eve and Adam") is a 1969 Filipino drama film directed by Gerry de Leon. The film is based on a story written by Pablo S. Gomez, and it centers on themes of love, morality, and the complexities of human relationships. Known for his masterful direction in Filipino cinema, Gerry de Leon brought his signature storytelling style to the film, often weaving deep psychological themes into his works.

The film is significant not only for its engaging plot but also for its contribution to the Filipino movie industry during the late 1960s. In the context of the film's production, "Si Eva at si Adan" gained attention for its bold exploration of human desires and emotions, which were controversial yet resonated with audiences.

The film starred a cast of prominent Filipino actors, including actors who were at the peak of their careers during this period, contributing to the film's success.

Gervacio Santos was a highly skilled and prolific editor in the Filipino film industry, known for his remarkable editing work. Over the course of his career as a house editor at Premiere Productions, he edited an average of one feature film every month, a testament to his expertise and efficiency. His editing contributions were integral to numerous films directed by some of the most respected figures in the industry.

Among the directors he worked with were Nemesio Caravana, known for his work in social dramas; Cesar Gallardo, whose films often focused on the intricacies of human emotion; and Efren Reyes, a director celebrated for his action films. He also collaborated with Bert Avellana, Eddie Romero, and Teodorico Santos, who were influential in shaping the golden age of Filipino cinema. Additionally, he worked with Eddie Infante and Josefino Cenizal, directors whose films covered a range of genres from drama to action.

Santos’ editing style contributed significantly to the pacing, tone, and emotional impact of the films he worked on, helping to elevate the stories and performances of the actors. His work in shaping the visual narrative of these films was instrumental in establishing his reputation as one of the foremost editors of his time in Philippine cinema.

In 1967, after leaving Premiere Productions studio, he joined Tamaraw Studios, which was founded and managed by Albert Joseph and his brothers. Tamaraw Studios became a significant player in the Filipino film industry, offering a range of services, including editing and laboratory facilities, that catered primarily to independent film productions. Among the notable productions that benefited from Tamaraw Studios’ services were Tagalog Ilang-Ilang Productions, AM (Amalia Fuentes) Productions, and JE (Joseph Estrada) Productions, which were prominent in the industry at the time.

As a freelance film editor, Santos expanded his work across several other renowned film studios in the Philippines, including LVN Studios, Sampaguita Pictures, and FIL-AM (Fernando Poe Productions). These studios were key hubs in the Filipino film industry, where various movie producers had their films shot, processed, and edited for post-production. Working in these diverse settings, Santos gained extensive experience and became a highly sought-after editor. By the time his career reached its peak, he had edited several hundred full-length Filipino films, solidifying his reputation as one of the leading figures in the country's film editing community.

His work spanned across a wide variety of genres, and his expertise in editing was instrumental in shaping the final outcome of many iconic films from the era. This allowed him to work closely with directors, producers, and other key members of the production team, contributing greatly to the success of countless films in the Filipino cinema landscape.

After establishing a strong reputation for his editing skills, Gervacio Santos was sought after by American filmmakers shooting in the Philippines. During this period, he transitioned to editing American films, working primarily alongside Roger Corman, a legendary American filmmaker known for producing low-budget but highly influential films, especially in the exploitation genres.

Gervacio has worked under numerous pseudonyms including: George Santos, Gerry Santos, Herb Bas, Bas Santos, and Bass Santos. (IMDb has a partial list of the several movies he had edited for them.) https://www.imdb.com/name/nm0764099/

Corman frequently collaborated with Filipino filmmakers like Cirio Santiago, who was a key figure in the Filipino film industry. Santiago's production company, the Cirio Santiago Film Organization, worked on a variety of action and exploitation films, many of which were co-produced with Corman's New World Pictures. Santos played a significant role in editing these films, which were often produced on tight schedules and budgets but still managed to capture audiences with their unique and gritty styles.

Through his partnership with Corman and Santiago, Santos became known for his efficient editing work on many of these low-budget productions. His contributions helped shape the final look and pacing of a wide range of films that became cult classics in the exploitation, action, and sci-fi genres.

=== Film Editors Guild and Film Academy of the Philippines ===
Gervacio Santos held the position of president of the Film Editors Guild of the Philippines for two terms, first from 1974 to 1983 and then again from 1984 to 1986. During his time as president of the Guild, he was deeply involved in efforts to elevate the standards of film editing in the Philippines.

Under his leadership, the Guild focused on the professional development of its members, advocating for better working conditions and fair compensation for film editors. He worked to strengthen the solidarity among film editors and other film industry professionals, ensuring their contributions to the film process were acknowledged, promoting the advancement of the profession, and ensuring that the craft of film editing received recognition within the industry.

His advocacy extended beyond the Guild. As a member of the Board of Governors of the Film Academy of the Philippines (FAP), he played an instrumental role in influencing the direction of the national film industry. The FAP, which supports the development of Filipino filmmakers and the preservation of Filipino cinema, was a platform where he could help push for reforms that benefitted both the technical and creative sides of filmmaking. His input on the Board helped shape key policies, such as promoting the recognition of excellence in the industry, encouraging more local productions, and fostering a better understanding of the role of editors in the filmmaking process.

His dual leadership positions gave him a unique perspective on both the practical and organizational sides of the film industry. Through his work with the FEGP and FAP, he contributed to several initiatives that aimed to advance Filipino cinema on both a national and international level, including organizing events like the Filipino Academy of Movie Arts and Sciences (FAMAS) awards and supporting training programs for emerging filmmakers and editors.

Overall, his leadership within these organizations helped to raise the profile of the Filipino film industry, securing his legacy as a pivotal figure who made lasting contributions to its growth and recognition.

Gervacio has earned numerous awards, including three Famas Awards for Kalibre 45 (1957), Cavalry Command (1963) and Scout Rangers (1964). He won Best Film Editing Awards in both the Metro Manila Film Festival for "Remembrance" and in the Quezon City Film Festival for "Alyas Bagsik".

== Personal Life and Retirement ==
In 1989, despite having a film project with renowned director Cirio Santiago to edit two films, Santos, along with his family, immigrated to Toronto, Ontario, Canada. Though he initially intended to return to the Philippines to complete his assignments, unforeseen circumstances—such as changes in his personal and professional life—prevented him from doing so. This decision marked a significant shift in his career.

After relocating to Canada, Santos chose to retire and settled there with his wife, children, grandchildren, and great-grandchildren. Over the years, he and his family became proud Canadian citizens, embracing their new life and culture.

During the period from 2012 to 2021, Santos appeared on the Toronto television show Filipino, Eh"!, a comedy series that celebrated Filipino culture in Canada. In this show, he participated in various comedic skits, earning praise for his versatile acting and humorous style.

This involvement helped him stay connected to the Filipino-Canadian community and allowed him to maintain a presence in the entertainment industry, even after stepping away from his earlier work in film editing.

== Death ==
Gervacio died peacefully in September 2024 at the age of 97, leaving behind a legacy of cherished memories and a life well-lived.

He left a lasting impact on all who knew him. His remarkable life, filled with wisdom, kindness, and unforgettable moments, will be deeply missed by everyone who had the privilege of crossing his path.

== Notable Achievements and Accomplishments ==
Professional:

- Former President of the Film Editors Guild of the Philippines
- Member - Board of Governors of the Film Academy of the Philippines

Personal:

- Eucharistic Minister - Our Lady of Grace Parish Church
- Education Chairman - Our Lady of Grace Parish Church
- Chair - Mariology Seminars, Our Lady of Grace Parish Church
- Member - Knights of Columbus, 4th Degree
- President - Grace Park Toastmasters Club. Awarded Champion in Extemporaneous Speech in an Area Competition
- Number One Councillor (1988) - Caloocan Barangay Council (local government unit)

== Filmography ==
- Dune Warriors (1990)
- Demon of Paradise (1987)
- The Fighter (1987) (as Bass Santos)
  - a.k.a. The Kick Fighter
- Eye of the Eagle (1986)
- Future Hunters (1986)
  - a.k.a. Deadly Quest
  - a.k.a. Spear of Destiny
- The Devastator (1985)
  - a.k.a. Kings Ransom
  - a.k.a. The Destroyers
- Final Mission (1984)
  - a.k.a. Last Mission
- Wheels of Fire (1984)
  - a.k.a. Desert Warrior
  - a.k.a. Pyro
  - a.k.a. Vindicator
- Stryker (1983)
- Get My Son Dead or Alive (1982)
  - a.k.a. Savage Dawn (video title)
- Firecracker (1981)
  - a.k.a. Naked Fist
- Up from the Depths (1979)
- Death Force (1978)
  - a.k.a. Fierce
  - a.k.a. Fighting Mad
- Hell Hole (1978)
  - a.k.a. Escape from Women's Hell Hole (USA: video title)
  - a.k.a. Women of Hell's Island (video title)
- The Muthers (1976)
- She Devils in Chains (1976)
  - a.k.a. American Beauty Hostages
  - a.k.a. Ebony, Ivory, and Jade
  - a.k.a. Foxfire
  - a.k.a. Foxforce
- Cover Girl Models (1975)
- Supercock (1975)
  - a.k.a. A Fistful of Feathers (USA)
  - a.k.a. Fowl Play
  - a.k.a. Superchicken
- TNT Jackson (1975)
- Bamboo Gods and Iron Men (1974)
  - a.k.a. Black Kung Fu (USA: video title)
- Fly Me (1973) (as George Santos)
- Scout Ranger (1964)
- Cavalry Command (1963)
  - a.k.a. The Day of the Trumpet
- Terror Is a Man (1959)

x Movini's Venom (1970)

  - a.k.a. Blood Creature (USA: reissue title)
  - a.k.a. Creature from Blood Island
  - a.k.a. The Gory Creatures
- The Scavengers (1959)
- Kalibre .45 (1957)
