= Jean Bell =

African-American model and actress

Playboy centerfold appearance
- October 1969
- Preceded by: Shay Knuth
- Succeeded by: Claudia Jennings

Personal details
- Born: Annie Lee Morgan; November 23, 1944 (age 81) St. Louis, Missouri, U.S.
- Height: 5 ft 4 in (1.63 m)

Jean Bell (born Annie Lee Morgan on November 23, 1944), also known as Annie Judis, is a former Playboy Playmate of the Month, and one of the first African American women to feature in this role. She later had a career as an actress in movies, most prominently in TNT Jackson, in which she played the title character, and supporting roles in Mean Streets and The Klansman, as well as occasional TV appearances. She is now a fitness influencer, with over 100,000 followers on instagram.

== Biography ==
Bell grew up in Houston, Texas, along with three younger sisters and attended Texas Southern University, majoring in business administration. Jean was the first African American woman to participate in the Miss Texas Pageant, which is part of the Miss Universe competition. She aspired to professional bowling or acting.

When she appeared in the October 1969 issue of Playboy, Bell was only the second African-American woman to be the centerfold (the first being Jennifer Jackson, in March 1965). Her centerfold was photographed by Don Klumpp. A few months later, Bell became the first black person to grace the magazine cover. Darine Stern, who is often erroneously credited with this distinction, was actually the first black woman to appear alone on the cover of Playboy, in the October 1971 issue. Bell was featured with four other playmates on the January 1970 cover.

After Bell's appearance in Playboy, she enjoyed a brief acting career, working on such films as Mean Streets and The Klansman (for some roles she was credited as Jeanne Bell). Her most popular role was the title character in 1975's TNT Jackson.

Bell dated Richard Burton and helped him quit drinking, thus being credited with reuniting him afterwards with Elizabeth Taylor. An Earl Wilson column in September 1975 revealed Bell's three-month friendship with the actor. She visited Burton at his villa in Céligny, Switzerland, during her effort to help him "dry out". With his assistance Bell acquired a place of her own in Geneva, Switzerland. Around that time, Bell worked at Splendors Gentlemen's Club in Houston as "Bunny".

Bell posed nude again for Playboy in the December 1979 pictorial "Playmates Forever!", and subsequently disappeared from public life.

In 1986 she married Gary Judis, then-Chairman of the Board of the California Independent Mortgage Brokers Association, after an eight-year courtship. They were married for 45 years until he died in 2022.

Now known as Annie Judis, she still regularly works out at the gym and is a strong advocate for a healthy active life style at any age. On Feb. 23, 2019, she was recognized by the Guinness Book of World Records as the World's Oldest Competitive Rope Skipper at the age of 75 and has since broken that record multiple times. She also paints and has designed illustrations for children's books by Cal Wilson. She is considered a fitness influencer, and has over 100,000 followers on instagram. She set another world record in November 2024 by holding a dead hang position for two minutes at age 81.

== Film and television work ==
=== Films ===
- The Choirboys (1977) .... Fanny Forbes
- Casanova & Co. (1977) .... Fatme
- The Muthers (1976) .... Kelly
- Disco 9000 (1976) (as Jeanie Bell) .... Karen
- TNT Jackson (1975) .... Diana "TNT" Jackson
- Policewomen (1974) .... Pam Harris
- The Klansman (1974) .... Mary Anne
- Negro es un bello color (1974) .... Joyce
- Three the Hard Way (1974) .... Polly
- Mean Streets (1973) .... Diane
- Black Gunn (1972) .... Lisa
- Trouble Man (1972) .... Leona
- Melinda (1972) .... Jean

=== Television ===
- Starsky and Hutch - "Starsky and Hutch Are Guilty" (1977) .... Kate
- Baretta - "Carla" (1977) .... Midge
- Kolchak: The Night Stalker - "Primal Scream" (1975) .... Rosetta Mason
- That's My Mama - "Clifton's Big Move" (1974) .... Ginger
- Police Woman - "Seven-Eleven" (1974) .... Marie
- Sanford and Son - "Lamont, Is That You?" (1973) .... Judy Ann
- The Beverly Hillbillies
  - "Hotel for Women" (1970) .... Sugar Jean Bell
  - "Three-Day Reprieve" (1970) .... Sugar Jean Bell
  - "Shorty Spits the Hook" (1970) .... Sugar Jean Bell
  - "Marry Me, Shorty" (1970) .... Sugar Jean Bell

== Trivia ==
In Quentin Tarantino's Kill Bill movies, Vivica A. Fox's character uses the alias "Jeannie Bell", a reference to Jean Bell.

== See also ==
- List of people in Playboy 1960–1969

Leslie Bianchini	Lorrie Menconi	Kathy MacDonald	Lorna Hopper	Sally Sheffield	Helena Antonaccio
Nancy McNeil	Debbie Hooper	Shay Knuth	Jean Bell	Claudia Jennings	Gloria Root
