= TNT Jackson =

1974 film by Cirio H. Santiago

- Original film poster by John Solie.
- Directed by: Cirio Santiago
- Written by: Ken Metcalfe; Dick Miller
- Produced by: Cirio Santiago
- Starring: Jeanne Bell; Chiquito; Stan Shaw
- Cinematography: Philip Sacdalan
- Edited by: Barbara Pokras; Gervacio Santos
- Music by: Tito Sotto
- Production company: New World Pictures; Premiere Productions; HPS Films
- Distributed by: New World Pictures (US)
- Release dates: June 8, 1974 (Philippines); July 7, 1975 (U.S.)
- Running time: 72 minutes
- Countries: United States; Philippines
- Language: English
- Box office: US$1.3 million

TNT Jackson (released in the Philippines as Dynamite Wong and T.N.T. Jackson) is a 1974 blaxploitation martial arts film produced and directed by Cirio H. Santiago, and starring Jeanne Bell, Stan Shaw, Chiquito, and Pat Anderson. It follows Diana "TNT" Jackson, a Black American martial artist who travels to Hong Kong to find her missing brother. The film was an American and Philippine co-production, and was released in the United States by New World Pictures.

== Plot ==
The film is about Diana Jackson (nicknamed "TNT"), who learns her brother is missing. She suspects a powerful gangster and his friends are behind the disappearance. Determined to get at the truth, she goes to Hong Kong, and along with a friend named Joe, wages war on the criminal gang she's out to nail.

== Cast ==
- Jeanne Bell as Diana "TNT" Jackson
- Chiquito as Joe "Dynamite" Wong
- Stan Shaw as Charlie
- Pat Anderson as Elaine
- Max Alvarado
- Ken Metcalfe as Sid
- Imelda Ilanan as Joe's Assistant
- Leo Martinez
- Percy Gordon
- Chris Cruz
- Joonee Gamboa as Drug Dealer

Uncredited

- Jose Mari Avellana as Ming
- Shirley Washington

== Production ==
Though set in Hong Kong, the film was shot (with the exception of stock shots) in Manila. It was one of several Philippine-shot productions by Roger Corman's New World Pictures during the 1970s.

The script was originally written by actor Dick Miller, but Corman had it rewritten in the Philippines by expatriate American actor Ken Metcalfe, who plays Sid.

== Release ==
In the Philippines, the film was titled Dynamite Wong and T.N.T. Jackson, promoting Chiquito as a co-lead.

== See also ==
- List of American films of 1974
- List of blaxploitation films
