= List of Too Close for Comfort episodes =

The following is a list of episodes for the television series Too Close for Comfort. The first two seasons have been released on DVD by Rhino Entertainment.

== Series overview ==
Season	Episodes	Originally released			Rank	Rating
Season	Episodes	First released	Last released	Network	Rank	Rating
1	19	November 11, 1980	May 12, 1981	ABC	15	20.8 (Tied with Happy Days)
2	22	October 13, 1981	May 11, 1982	ABC	6	22.6 (Tied with The Dukes of Hazzard)
3	22	September 30, 1982	May 5, 1983	ABC	38	—N/a
4	23	April 7, 1984	December 8, 1984	Syndication	—N/a	—N/a
5	21	February 5, 1985	November 23, 1985	Syndication	—N/a	—N/a
6	22	April 5, 1986	February 7, 1987	Syndication	—N/a	—N/a

== Episodes ==
=== Season 1 (1980–81) ===
No. overall	No. in season	Title	Directed by	Written by	Original release date	Prod. code
1	1	"Pilot"	Will Mackenzie	Arne Sultan, Earl Barrett & Brian Cooke	November 11, 1980	001
Henry and Muriel Rush are the owners of a duplex in San Francisco, where they live with their two adult daughters: 21-year-old banker Jackie and 18-year-old college freshman Sara, in a cramped, awkward arrangement. Henry is a cartoonist of a comic strip called Cosmic Cow, while Muriel is a former musician currently working as a photographer. When Henry and Muriel's downstairs tenant, Nevell Rafkin, suddenly dies, the family discovers Rafkin was living a secret life as a cross-dresser, and the many mysterious women Henry had been opening the door for all those years were actually Rafkin himself. Sara comes up with the idea for her and Jackie to convince their parents to let them to move into Rafkin's former apartment. Henry rejects the idea at first, but after Henry interviews a couple of prospective tenants he doesn't approve of, Muriel convinces him that having the girls move in may not be such a bad idea.
2	2	"It Didn't Happen One Night"	Will Mackenzie	Arne Sultan & Earl Barrett	November 16, 1980	002
With Sara and Jackie now living in the downstairs apartment, Henry has been excessively snooping in on their personal business. Sara asks for permission to go to Lake Tahoe for the weekend with three of her girlfriends from school, leaving behind birth control pills that one of Sara's friends left at the apartment so her father won't find out. Henry goes into panic mode after he finds the pills in her room, leading him to worry about Jackie as well when she goes out on a date with her navyman boyfriend who is in town from San Diego for the weekend, and lets him spend the night at the apartment (in Sara's room), causing Henry to hit the roof.
3	3	"The Bag Lady"	Will Mackenzie	Tony Garofalo	November 18, 1980	003
Jackie, who works at a bank, tries to make a money delivery to a supermarket, but finds it has already closed and she is unable to take it to the bank's vault; after calling her boss, she finds herself in charge of a bag containing $100,000 in it. Meanwhile when the pipes in Muriel's darkroom begin to rattle, Henry finds out what's causing it and creates a small hole in the wall when he finds out what is causing the rattling, and a much bigger one when Henry tries to hammer a nail in the wall to hang a picture to cover the original hole; Muriel tries to talk him into hiring a plumber, but Henry balks at the prospect of paying a fortune for a professional one. Muriel finds two ex-convicts working as plumbers, as part of a rehabilitation program for prisoners, but Henry is convinced that the ex-con plumbers are going to rip them off. Jackie and Sara inform Henry and Muriel about the money, leading the Rushes to try and hide it from the plumbers; Henry decides to take it upon himself to hide the cash, leaving Jackie miffed that her father doesn't think she can be trusted with the responsibility. But when Henry creatively hides the cash separately in a tissue box and a flashlight, they worry that the plumbers might have run off with it when they discover the plumbers took the wrong flashlight, the one Henry hid $50,000 in.
4	4	"Sara's Monroe Doctrine"	Will Mackenzie	Mort Scharfman & Harvey Weitzman	November 25, 1980	004
Sara befriends Monroe Ficus, a recently dumped young man, who quickly follows her all over the place even following her home. Meanwhile, Henry and Muriel plan on celebrating their anniversary but just before heading out for the evening they get a phone call from Sara and Monroe with news that they have been arrested. Note: Jim J. Bullock appears for the first time in the series, in the recurring role of Monroe Ficus. Bullock became a series regular in the middle of the second season.
5	5	"Que Sara, Sara"	Will Mackenzie	Mitch Markowitz	December 2, 1980	005
Jackie and Sara have split the cost of rent but when Sara is unable to pay her half, Henry tells her to go out and get a job. Sara easily gets a job as a waitress, but Henry is in no way thrilled with the skimpy costume that she has to wear. This leads to a blow up between Henry and Muriel leading her to move in with Jackie and Sara.
6	6	"Tenants Anyone?"	Howard Storm	Mitch Markowitz	December 9, 1980	006
The furniture of the previous tenant, Rafkin, has become Jackie and Sara's but when his sister (Selma Diamond) shows up to claim his belongings, they find themselves in an unfurnished apartment. When Henry refuses to pay for new furniture, the girls decide to move out and into an unsafe part of town.
7	7	"Who's Afraid of the Big Bad Wolfe?"	Howard Storm	Rich Reinhart	December 16, 1980	007
When Sara gets a part-time job at Jackie's bank, things go smoothly. Jackie quickly warns her of the branch manager, Mr. Wolfe, and his "friendliness" toward the women tellers. However, Jackie quickly finds herself changing her mind about Sara, when Sara begins dating him and then suddenly gets a promotion.
8	8	"Mister Big"	Herbert Kenwith	Arne Sultan & Earl Barret	January 6, 1981	008
Henry is worried about his job when the new mystery loving boss, Arthur Wainwright, takes over and begins a steady practice of age discrimination. However, things may swing his way, when Muriel invites Arthur over for dinner which quickly embroils him in a quest to find the man who had snatched Sara's purse.
9	9	"The Location"	Russ Petranto	Austin Kalish & Irma Kalish	January 13, 1981	009
Sara and Monroe are ecstatic when a movie director decides Jackie and Sara's apartment would be perfect to film a movie. However, Henry and Muriel are totally unsure of the situation. Things get out of hand when a lion, being used for the film, gets loose and takes up residence in Henry and Muriel's kitchen.
10	10	"A Friend in Need"	John Bowab	Rich Reinhart	January 27, 1981	011
Monroe has been struggling with the fact he is still a virgin and seeks out a psychologist for help. The psychologist suggests that Monroe hire a sex surrogate to solve his problem, but unfortunate circumstances cause Monroe to mistake Mrs. Rafkin for the surrogate, and the surrogate to mistake Henry for Monroe.
11	11	"A Fine Romance"	Russ Petranto	Gail Honigberg	February 3, 1981	012
Sylvia Walker, an old college friend and recently divorced friend of Muriel's arrives in town for a visit and decides to make the most of the rest of her life. Meanwhile, Henry becomes insecure about his age after glancing over the obituaries and thinks he may be on death's doorstep soon. However, things turn around for him, when Sylvia makes a play for him.
12	12	"The Boy in the Band"	Russ Petranto	Austin Kalish & Irma Kalish	February 10, 1981	010
Rich Holland, a man who took Muriel on the road with a band when she was young arrives in town looking just as young as ever. Henry soon feels old and becomes insecure, however, Muriel also becomes insecure when Rich takes an interest in Jackie.
13	13	"Deadline for Henry"	Linda Day	Sam Greenbaum	February 17, 1981	013
Henry is not happy with the fact that he has been called in for jury duty. However, things get pressed when Henry's boss, Mr. Wainwright, wanting to avoid any problems associated with a possible strike, orders Henry to cough up next week's comic strip. This forces Henry to stay up all night and leads to him falling asleep in court the next day.
14	14	"Huey"	Russ Petranto	Arne Sultan & Earl Barret	February 24, 1981	014
Henry's father, Huey breaks out of the nursing home, or rather is thrown out when he has a romantic interlude with another resident. He arrives in San Francisco to stay with Henry but soon his presence sends the household into an uproar. Meanwhile, Jackie debates over whether or not to accept a job offer in New York.
15	15	"Centerfold"	Russ Petranto	Bryan Joseph	March 3, 1981	015
A football player, Buck Krulik, is in town and a fan of Henry's Cosmic Cow comic strip, so he comes by for a visit and has Jackie, Sara and Muriel fawn all over him. After admiring some of her photography, Buck remembers her when a nude centerfold photo shoot goes awry and he calls her in to take over. However, she may not be quite ready for a male nude spread, despite Henry forbidding her.
16	16	"What's Wrong with Mr. Right?"	Russ Petranto	Austin Kalish & Irma Kalish	March 17, 1981	016
A woman arrives at Sara and Jackie's door accusing Sara of dating her husband. However, the woman has the wrong Rush daughter, Jackie is the one and doesn't see anything wrong with it since they are separated. Still, she begins to feel her relationship coming to an end and quick.
17	17	"Up Your Easter Bonnet"	Russ Petranto	Adele Styler & Burt Styler	March 24, 1981	017
Out of pity, Henry reluctantly allows Monroe to crash on his couch for Easter week when Monroe's parents decide they don't want him to visit them in Miami. Henry soon regrets his generosity when he learns that Monroe has ruined his unpublished Cosmic Cow drawings, and in turn his own planned vacation.
18	18	"Cosmic Cow vs. the Oval Office"	Lee Lochhead	Paul Hunter	May 5, 1981	018
Henry is fired by Mr. Wainwright when he refuses to publish an apology for his recent Cosmic Cow comic strips that poke fun at President Reagan. Rather than face the indignity of taking unemployment compensation, he makes the regrettable decision to pursue his passion for painting and lets Muriel accept an offer for a full time job she doesn't really want.
19	19	"The Return of Rafkin"	John Bowab	Adele Styler & Burt Styler	May 12, 1981	019
Sara arranges for a medium to conduct a séance to connect Mildred Rafkin with her deceased brother in an attempt to find a missing antique brooch. However, an accusation leveled by Rafkin's "spirit" threatens to split up Henry and Muriel, when the voice of the Rushes' late tenant accuses Henry of marital infidelity.

=== Season 2 (1981–82) ===
- Starting with the episode "What's Our Rush", Jim J. Bullock (Monroe Ficus) is upgraded to series regular status and appears in the opening credits from that point on (with the exception of the season two episodes "Where There's a Will", "The Remaking of Monroe" and "When the Bough Breaks", which were aired out of production order).

No. overall	No. in season	Title	Directed by	Written by	Original release date	Prod. code
20	1	"Guess Who's Coming to Burp?"	Russ Petranto	Arne Sultan & Earl Barret	October 13, 1981	201
A doctor informs Muriel that she's pregnant after she faints at a restaurant while celebrating her 42nd birthday with her family. While she and Henry are initially elated, they find themselves faced with a serious decision as they begin to realize all of the implications of having another child at this point of their lives.
21	2	"Your Guest Is as Good as Mine"	Russ Petranto	Jeff Reno & Ron Osborn	October 27, 1981	202
Henry's free-spirited niece, April, shows up on his doorstep after moving from Delaware to start a song writing career, and he reluctantly allows her to stay in the guest bedroom of his apartment until she's able to get established. However, their relationship starts off on the wrong foot, and Henry hopes it isn't too late when he finally figures out why.
22	3	"Who's Sara Now?"	Russ Petranto	S : Skip Usen; T : Arne Sultan & Earl Barrett	November 3, 1981	203
Muriel and Henry read a newspaper article about a nurse who had switched babies in the maternity ward of the hospital that Sara had been delivered at. They quickly set out to find if indeed Sara had been switched at birth. However, they aren't too pleased when they discover the only other baby girl in the maternity ward is now serving time in prison.
23	4	"The Prince and the Frog"	Lee Lochhead	Lesa Kite & Cindy Begel	November 10, 1981	206
Jackie openly dreads a visit from an annoying, nerdy guy who had a crush on her when she was a kid. However, when Sara is the first to discover his physical appearance has changed completely and starts dating him, Jackie becomes jealous and vindictive.
24	5	"What's Our Rush?"	Russ Petranto	T : Arne Sultan, Earl Barret, Austin Kalish, Irma Kalish; S/T : Jerry Winnick	November 17, 1981	208
Muriel goes in for an amniocentesis, but she and Henry decline to learn the sex of the baby. This doesn't sit well with Henry's mischievous father Huey, who is in town to bury his deceased friend. In the meantime, Jackie makes an unexpected decision after taking part in a successful strike at her bank.
25	6	"Rafkin's Bum"	Russ Petranto	Arne Sultan & Earl Barret	November 24, 1981	210
An older man dressed like a bum shows up at the Rushes' doorstep looking for the transvestite persona of Rafkin, their deceased former tenant, because they always got together for Thanksgiving dinner. Feeling bad for him for several obvious reasons, they invite him to join their own disastrous get together, and later find out that he too has a big secret that involves his appearance.
26	7	"Where There's a Will"	Lee Lochhead	Austin Kalish & Irma Kalish	December 1, 1981	205
Hearing a story about a man who died intestate causes Henry to have a terrible nightmare, which compels him to finally make out his will. However, he soon regrets his decision to follow Monroe's advice to do it on videotape in the presence of his family.
27	8	"The Remaking of Monroe"	Russ Petranto	Ken Hecht & Bob Brunner	December 8, 1981	204
Monroe enrolls in an assertiveness class on the advice of the Rush girls after being pushed around at a concert, but the class proves to work a little too well. Meanwhile, one of Henry's colleagues suggests Henry demand a raise from Mr. Wainwright.
28	9	"When the Bough Breaks"	Russ Petranto	Austin Kalish & Irma Kalish	December 15, 1981	207
Muriel unwisely commits herself to do a coveted helicopter photo shoot, which Henry demands she cancel due to her pregnancy. The back and forth fighting cause a big headache for the girls, who are forced to change their minds several times whether to cancel an elaborate surprise 25th anniversary party they had previously scheduled.
29	10	"Cop-Out"	Russ Petranto	Bruce Kalish & Philip John Taylor	January 5, 1982	209
Jackie falls madly in love with a police officer who responds to a false burglary report at the apartment due to April sneaking in late one night after getting stuck on Alcatraz with her boyfriend. She immediately accepts his marriage proposal after just a few dates, refusing her parents' plea to consider the difficulties of being a police wife.
30	11	"April and September"	Russ Petranto	George Bloom	January 12, 1982	213
Henry is going up the wall with April keeping such late hours, spending time with her latest boyfriend. However, Henry and Muriel are in for a shock when they discover her boyfriend, Don is old enough to be her father. Henry puts his foot down and that's when Don asks April to move in with him, which she gladly accepts.
31	12	"A Fan for Henry"	Lee Lochhead	Erik Tarloff	January 19, 1982	212
A fan of Henry's Cosmic Cow comic strip who has been sending him increasingly bizarre fan mail breaks into the apartment one night through the unlocked front door, kidnapping his puppet and vowing in a note to return before the end of the weekend. Interpreting the note as a threat on his life, Henry and Monroe set up a stakeout at the apartment with the help of a police officer, who abruptly leaves them to fend for themselves when he is called away.
32	13	"Brotherly Hate"	Lee Lochhead	Jeff Reno & Ron Osborn	February 2, 1982	211
April secretly arranges for her father Bill to meet face to face with his brother Henry, so they can attempt to reconcile after a petty childhood dispute caused them to stop speaking forty years ago. The effort may be for naught, however, when Bill eats a piece of cheesecake baked by Monroe, who did not realize it was an old Russian recipe for homemade poisoned rat bait. Absent: Lydia Cornell as Sara Rush
33	14	"Charlie's Last Hurrah"	Russ Petranto	T : Jeff Reno & Ron Osborn; S/T : Jill Baer & Christopher Vane	February 9, 1982	214
Henry is contacted by a rival cartoonist who has perpetrated several practical jokes on him over the years, and Henry schemes with Monroe to pay him back during a dinner visit. However, when Henry is unable to stop the prank after the man claims he is dying, Henry feels obligated to assist him in an elaborate plan to cheat on his wife.
34	15	"The Last Weekend"	Lee Lochhead	Jeff Cohn	February 16, 1982	215
Upon realizing the birth of his third child is only six weeks away, Henry feels a sense of guilt for not spending enough time with his two daughters. He decides to invite them on a weekend ski trip, but the experience doesn't turn out quite the way he envisioned when the girls meet a couple of brothers and he discovers that Monroe packed the wrong suitcase in the car.
35	16	"My Unfavorite Martin"	Russ Petranto	Julie Friedgen	February 23, 1982	220
Muriel secretly asks her mother Iris stay with her until she recovers from childbirth, much to the chagrin of Henry, who has always found her to be overbearing. When Muriel unexpectedly takes a stand against her mother's nonstop criticism, it is up to Henry to straighten out the mess, and he learns a big secret about Muriel in the process. Note: This is the first appearance of Audrey Meadows in the recurring role of Iris Martin.
36	17	"Seventh Month Blues"	Lee Lochhead	S : Jerry Winnick; T : Earl Barret & George Bloom	March 2, 1982	216
Henry's generous offer to arrange a job interview for an attractive art student backfires when she begins showing affection for him, which puts him in the doghouse with an increasingly insecure Muriel and causes him to panic when Monroe tells him that she tried to jump out a window after her last break up. Henry and Muriel also host a Lamaze class in their apartment, which turns out to be a bad idea.
37	18	"As the Cookie Crumbles"	Lee Lochhead	S : Jesse Dizon & Don Haberman; T : Bruce Taylor	March 9, 1982	217
Just before heading off on a Las Vegas vacation, Henry reluctantly lends $100 to Sara, April and Monroe so they can start a business selling home-baked cookies using Grandma Rush's recipe. However, a promising and profitable start quickly turns into a disaster that includes a trashed kitchen, hefty fines, a potential lawsuit, and a visit from the immigration service.
38	19	"Foreign Exchange"	Russ Petranto	S : Richard Marcus; T : Jeff Reno & Ron Osborn	March 16, 1982	218
In order to reduce the cost of a trip to Europe, Jackie and Sara swap apartments with an English couple who wants to visit America. Henry's misgivings are confirmed when he accidentally opens a piece of their luggage that contains a high-powered rifle, and concludes they are on a mission to assassinate a Russian ambassador.
39	20	"A Matter of Degree"	Earl Barret & Nancy Heydorn	S : Earl Barret, Arne Sultan, Austin Kalish, Irma Kalish; T : Milt Rosen	March 23, 1982	221
Henry refuses to accept Sara's decision to drop out of college to become the weather announcer on a local television station, which causes her to announce that she's moving out in protest. Meanwhile, Monroe's clumsy method of wallpapering the baby's nursery has an unexpected outcome, and a wealthy family friend brings the Rushes a much appreciated gift.
40	21	"A Policeman's Wife Is Not a Happy One"	Russ Petranto	Austin Kalish & Irma Kalish	May 4, 1982	222
Jackie's boyfriend Brad has recovered from his gunshot wound and decides he can't work a desk job, which causes him to reconsider the appropriateness of a long term relationship with her. Meanwhile, the Rushes' furnace goes out, and Monroe's desire to help only increases Henry's agony.
41	22	"Don't Shoot the Piano Movers"	Jon Sharp	S : Earl Barret & Arne Sultan; T : Bruce Kalish	May 11, 1982	219
April's father sends her his baby grand piano, and she takes up Monroe's offer to move it into the apartment with the help of a large friend for $20. This proves to be a big mistake when everyone gets trapped in the apartment just as Muriel begins feeling labor pains and Henry's just-married friend becomes desperate to be reunited with his bride.

=== Season 3 (1982–83) ===
- This season was the last to air on ABC, as it was cancelled at the end of the season due to declining ratings as a result of the show's move to Thursday nights, as part of a lineup of short-lived freshman series.

No. overall	No. in season	Title	Directed by	Written by	Original release date	Prod. code
42	1	"Break Out the Pampers: Part 1"	Russ Petranto	Arne Sultan & Earl Barret	September 30, 1982	301
Henry and his daughters verge on total emotional and physical exhaustion after Muriel experiences one false labor after another. Henry is later called away to meet with Mr. Wainwright, leaving Muriel alone with Monroe, who has just purchased a motorcycle to replace his totaled car.
43	2	"Break Out the Pampers: Part 2"	Russ Petranto	Arne Sultan & Earl Barret	September 30, 1982	302
Muriel and Monroe make it safely to the hospital, and are soon joined by Henry and the girls. Not being in a proper state of mind, Henry tasks Monroe with calling Mr. Wainwright, which results in him getting fired just as Muriel begins delivery.
44	3	"Guess Who's Coming Forever?"	Russ Petranto	Laurie Gelman	October 14, 1982	303
Muriel's mother Iris (Audrey Meadows) pays an unexpected visit, and she agrees to call a truce with Henry for the sake of the new baby. The peace is short lived, however, when Iris encourages Sara to accept a job as a weekend evening weather anchor despite Henry's objection, causing Henry to move in with Monroe in protest.
45	4	"A Snip in Time"	Russ Petranto	Phil Doran & Douglas Arango	October 21, 1982	305
Henry becomes increasingly frustrated as he tries to understand why he hasn't been interested in making love to Muriel in the two months since Andrew was born. He takes a friend's advice and gets a vasectomy, but quickly finds out it doesn't solve all of his problems.
46	5	"The Luck of the Iris"	Chuck Liotta	Laurie Gelman	October 28, 1982	307
Andrew accidentally becomes exposed to the chicken pox, which Henry has never had. After exhausting all other options, Henry is forced to move in with Iris, and proceeds to interfere with her social life. Absent: Jim J. Bullock as Monroe Ficus
47	6	"Do You Take This Woman Again?"	Russ Petranto	Bruce Howard	November 4, 1982	310
Henry and Muriel decide to renew their wedding vows on their 26th anniversary, and allow their daughters to plan a simple ceremony for fifteen guests in the apartment. When Monroe becomes involved and schedules a $3,200 extravaganza for 65 people, Henry and Muriel reconsider their options.
48	7	"Who Was That Baby I Saw You With?"	Russ Petranto	Mark Masuoka	November 11, 1982	304
In an attempt to bring in extra income to buy a new couch for the girls' apartment, Muriel starts a baby photography business in the apartment using Henry and his Cosmic Cow puppet as a prop. She regrettably puts Monroe in charge of scheduling, which results in a tense situation when Andrew is mistaken for another baby and taken by one of their customers.
49	8	"Monroe's Secret Love's Secret"	Earl Barret	Phil Doran & Douglas Arango	November 18, 1982	309
Monroe falls in love with a coworker of Jackie's named Pat who refuses to go out with him, and Henry's advice causes him to turn into a stalker. Henry is compelled to straighten things out, but finds himself facing a much bigger problem when he discovers Pat is actually a cross-dressing man.
50	9	"A Thanksgiving Tale"	Russ Petranto	Larry Balmagia	November 25, 1982	311
Iris admits to Muriel that she gets depressed around the holidays because she thinks about her deceased husband. The whole family panics Thanksgiving morning when they hear a news report about a woman matching Iris' description who has jumped off the Golden Gate Bridge.
51	10	"Pressure's Rising"	Lee Lochhead	David Braff	December 9, 1982	313
The Rushes are shocked when a good family friend dies of a heart attack in the prime of his life and leaves his family penniless. Muriel pressures Henry to buy more life insurance, but he regrettably takes Monroe along to his physical.
52	11	"Mr. Christmas"	Russ Petranto	Larry Balmagia	December 16, 1982	316
The Rushes are forced to cancel their plans to spend Christmas at Mammoth Mountain when Andrew comes down with a fever. Henry's day gets even worse when he allows Monroe to help him decorate the tree, and Jackie invites a mysterious man dressed as Santa to spend the day with them.
53	12	"The Yearning Point"	Russ Petranto	David Randall & Frank Carrasquillo	January 6, 1983	312
Muriel is visited by Karen Day, her former singing partner from 26 years ago who has since become rich and famous. Henry becomes increasingly uncomfortable as he wonders if he prevented Muriel from becoming famous too, but Muriel discovers that wealth and fame aren't necessarily the keys to happiness.
54	13	"Briefly at the Counter"	Russ Petranto	S : Laurie Gelman, Jim Geoghan & Will Manus; S/T : Laurie Gelman	January 13, 1983	317
Iris falls in love with a man she meets at a soup shop who claims to be an investment banker, and he invites Henry and Muriel to join them for dinner at an expensive restaurant. When Muriel discovers a dark secret about the man, she and Henry must come up with a strategy on how to handle the situation.
55	14	"To Buy or Not to Buy"	Russ Petranto	Rick Sultan & Gary Ress	January 20, 1983	306
Sara lets two men posing as furniture refinishers into her parents' apartment who proceed to rob them of all of their valuables. Henry becomes determined to buy a shotgun despite Muriel's objections, leading to a huge fight. Meanwhile, the girls hire Monroe to fix their refrigerator.
56	15	"The Separation"	Lee Lochhead	Jurgen Wolff	January 27, 1983	314
Jackie and her fiancé Brad separate after Brad demands that she become a housewife. Her parents and grandmother try to help her by each recounting their own versions of a similar situation that occurred while Henry and Muriel were dating.
57	16	"Girls of the Media"	Russ Petranto	S : Kevin Hopps; T : Sally Sussman	February 3, 1983	318
Jackie achieves her own fashion line at Balaban's, and Henry's reaction convinces Sara that he treats the two of them unequally. Sara attempts to prove her point by agreeing to do a career-oriented interview and bikini pictorial for an adult magazine, but the plan backfires when the magazine superimposes her face on a naked body.
58	17	"The Courier"	Russ Petranto	S : Arne Sultan; T : Jurgen Wolff	February 17, 1983	319
Henry reluctantly allows a flirtatious substitute courier named Bambi to take a cold shower when she arrives for a pickup hung over. This proves to be an error in judgment when Bambi falls asleep in his bed wearing nothing but his robe just as Muriel arrives home. Note: Guest star Cisse Cameron, who appeared as Bambi in this episode, co-starred with Ted Knight in his short lived, self-titled sitcom called The Ted Knight Show (not to be confused with the later title for Too Close for Comfort, used during the sixth and final season) that aired in 1978.
59	18	"The Adoption Story"	Jeremiah Morris	Rick Sultan & Gary Ress	February 24, 1983	320
Iris buys two plane tickets to Paris for Muriel's 43rd birthday without realizing that Muriel will discover she's adopted when she applies for a passport. Henry convinces Iris to finally tell Muriel the truth, and Muriel decides to hire a private investigator to find her real parents.
60	19	"Out to Lunch"	Russ Petranto	Bill Daley	March 10, 1983	315
Just when the Rushes' financial situation seems bleak, Muriel is offered a two-day photo shoot for a beer company. Henry's task of taking care of Andrew hits a snag when Monroe causes him to waste both bottles of Muriel's breast milk, forcing Henry to interrupt her and jeopardize her job.
61	20	"A Portrait of Henry"	Chuck Liotta	Rich Orloff	March 17, 1983	308
Henry receives a mediocre portrait of himself from a friend, and insists on hanging it over the dining room table. It becomes a reflection of his conscience when his overreaction to Monroe's latest screw up results in Monroe sustaining serious injuries.
62	21	"Don't Rock the Boat"	Bruce Bilson	Arne Sultan & Earl Barret	April 28, 1983	322
Henry and Muriel travel to the Oxnard marina to visit his old Navy buddy Arthur, who is finally getting remarried after losing his wife 17 years ago. Henry convinces Arthur to cancel the wedding when he discovers Arthur's bride-to-be is only 26 years old, but he has a hard time breaking the news to her. Note: This episode was intended as a backdoor pilot for a proposed spinoff series titled Don't Rock the Boat, about a 52-year-old man who owns a boat repair business at a marina with his two adult sons, who marries a 26-year-old woman despite the objections of his sons and friends.
63	22	"Family Business"	Howard Storm	Phil Doran & Douglas Arango	May 5, 1983	321
After Iris is mugged in the garage of her condominium complex, Henry agrees to go along with Muriel's and Iris' plan to sell the condo and use the proceeds to add a third floor to the Rushes' apartment building. Unfortunately, they select a remodeling company that is going through a personnel transition. Note: As with the previous episode, this episode was intended as a backdoor pilot for a proposed spinoff series; Family Business was to have revolved around two Italian brothers, an aspiring violinist and an aspiring professional athlete, who reluctantly take over their deceased father's remodeling business at the request of their mother. ABC did not pick up the series for the 1983-84 television season, especially as Too Close for Comfort was cancelled by ABC after this episode aired and was picked up for first-run syndication the following year.

=== Season 4 (1984) ===
- Beginning this season, Too Close for Comfort began airing in first-run syndication, after Metromedia Producers Corporation began distributing the series.

No. overall	No. in season	Title	Directed by	Written by	Original release date	Prod. code
64	1	"The Enemy Above"	Russ Petranto	George Tricker & Neil Rosen	April 7, 1984	401
The third-floor addition to the Rush apartment is complete, but Henry has conflicting emotions when Iris is suddenly offered the opportunity become a partner in a Chicago travel agency. Meanwhile, Monroe is forced to find a new living arrangement when his apartment building is demolished.
65	2	"Making Mountains Out of Molehills"	Russ Petranto	George Tricker & Neil Rosen	April 14, 1984	403
Jackie is depressed that she hasn't been on a date since she broke up with Brad, while Sara seems to be dating a different guy every night. She thinks the solution to her problem is to get breast implants, which her parents and Sara try to talk her out of.
66	3	"Just Another Pretty Face"	Russ Petranto	Lindsay Harrison	April 21, 1984	411
Sara is given the opportunity to audition to become a news anchor at her station, and feels she is a shoo-in if she wears the right outfit, despite the fact Jackie exposes her total lack of preparedness for the job. Henry tries to rein in her expectations after he meets the woman she will be competing with, who is experienced but not photogenic.
67	4	"Home Is Where the Bart Is"	Russ Petranto	George Yanok	April 28, 1984	404
The Rushes are shocked when the city proposes to demolish their entire neighborhood to build a new BART subway station. Henry is conflicted when Monroe informs him that he could have his house declared an historical landmark because it used to be a famous brothel that was visited by a former president.
68	5	"High Infidelity"	Lee Lochhead	Rick Sultan & Gary Ress	May 5, 1984	407
Monroe's father comes to San Francisco on business, and the Rushes invite him to dinner. Monroe's joy quickly turns to devastation, however, when he later goes to his father's hotel room to return his wallet only to discover him having an affair.
69	6	"Son of the Groom"	Lee Lochhead	George Tricker & Neil Rosen	May 12, 1984	408
Henry is appalled when his 78-year-old father Huey comes for a visit and announces he's going to be marrying a woman half his age. Henry pleads with his father to reconsider, but the argument takes on a different tone when Huey announces his fiancée is pregnant. Note: Ray Middleton, who portrayed Henry's father Huey in this episode and three other previous episodes, died approximately one month before the original air date of this episode.
70	7	"Witness for the Persecution"	Russ Petranto	Bill Daley	May 19, 1984	405
Henry witnesses an armed robbery and is the only person who can identify the suspect. He fears for his family's safety when the suspect is bailed out after threatening to have him killed.
71	8	"Henry Draws a Blank"	Russ Petranto	Robert Gosnell & Danny Morris	May 26, 1984	406
Henry fears that he's run out of ideas for his Cosmic Cow comic strip, but he finds unexpected inspiration in the form of a drop-in visit from Mildred Rafkin. However, he soon regrets cutting her visit short.
72	9	"Shipmates"	Russ Petranto	Arne Sultan & Earl Barret	June 2, 1984	402
Henry invites his former Navy superior Frank to dinner, only to find out he's been in a gay relationship for the past 25 years. When Frank admits that his partner is terminally ill, Henry tells Muriel he has trouble feeling sympathy for them, which disturbs her deeply. Henry however by the end of the episode decides to put aside his discomforts with homosexuality and be there for his old friend in his time of need.
73	10	"Is There a Doctor in the House?"	Russ Petranto	Mickey Rose	June 9, 1984	409
Henry is excited about the possibility of receiving an honorary Doctor of Arts degree from the University of South Cavena ("The Other USC") if he donates his drawings to the school. However, he is devastated when the selection committee unexpectedly rejects his donation.
74	11	"High and Inside"	Russ Petranto	Larry Balmagia	June 16, 1984	410
Henry takes it upon himself to schedule Sara to go on a date with a well known baseball player, which she reluctantly agrees to. While the two click almost immediately, Henry demands Sara break off the relationship when he discovers the man is a cocaine addict. Absent: Jim J. Bullock as Monroe Ficus; although, Monroe calls home at the end of the episode to tell Henry he somehow wound up in Mexico while going surfing.
75	12	"The Runaway"	Russ Petranto	George Tricker & Neil Rosen	June 23, 1984	412
Henry reluctantly allows Monroe to have his friend Sam become a temporary roommate to help him with the rent. However, Henry is shocked when Sam turns out to be a runaway girl from Florida. Note: Elyse Knight, who guest starred as Sam, is the daughter of series star Ted Knight.
76	13	"The Graduates"	Nancy Heydorn	George Yanok	July 14, 1984	413
Monroe becomes depressed when both of his job interviews that Jackie and Sara arranged for him turn into disasters. When he contemplates staying in school to become a nuclear physicist, Henry regrettably talks him into becoming his assistant.
77	14	"Goodbye, Mr. Chip"	Lee Lochhead	Barry E. Blitzer	July 21, 1984	414
Monroe uses a loaned computer to pick stocks and horse races, which pays off immediately for him and the Rush girls, but upsets Henry. However, Henry has a change of heart when the computer picks a horse with 30:1 odds.
78	15	"No Patsy, This Kelly"	Lee Lochhead	S : Bill Davenport; S/T : George Tricker & Neil Rosen	October 6, 1984	415
While Henry frets over the possible expiration of his employment contract, he allows Monroe to have a colleague named Kelly spend the night because they have a security guard training class together the next day. However, Monroe fails to specify that Kelly is a Doberman Pinscher.
79	16	"Hawaii Five-8"	Peter Frazer-Jones	George Tricker & Neil Rosen	October 13, 1984	422
Iris treats Jackie and Sara to a ten-day trip to Hawaii, which Henry considers a wonderful gesture. However, his mood quickly changes when Jackie returns and announces she is engaged to a native Hawaiian surfing instructor.
80	17	"Quick on the Draw"	Russ Petranto	George Tricker & Neil Rosen	October 27, 1984	424
Henry breaks his arm when Monroe falls off a ladder and lands on top of him. His nightmare becomes worse when Mr. Wainwright assigns a young and obnoxious artist to assist him, who turns out to have the talent to back up his ego.
81	18	"The Missing Fink"	Peter Frazer-Jones	Rick Sultan & Gary Ress	November 3, 1984	421
While on a photo shoot at a new art exhibit, Muriel accidentally photographs a man who was about to testify against the mob, and has her camera confiscated by two government agents. However, she is ordered not to tell anyone the circumstances of what happened, which causes Henry to conclude she is having an affair.
82	19	"The Sound of Mother"	Earl Barret	Rick Sultan & Gary Ress	November 10, 1984	416
Henry and the girls invite Muriel's biological mother, who is stopping in San Francisco before sailing to the Orient over for dinner behind Muriel's back. While Muriel plans to use the opportunity to tell the woman off, she has a change of plans when the woman turns out to be a nun.
83	20	"The Return of Mr. Wonderful"	Earl Barret	Mickey Rose	November 17, 1984	417
Iris unexpectedly returns to San Francisco to be wined and dined by the shady character she had been dating during her previous stay, and her loved ones once again fear what his motivation is. Meanwhile, Sara gets a credit card.
84	21	"Divorce Chicago Style"	Peter Frazer-Jones	T : Bill Davenport; S/T : Wendy Scott	November 24, 1984	420
Muriel becomes depressed after a visit from her friend Sylvia, who has recently gotten remarried and is having the time of her life. She decides to resume her photography career, but she feels uneasy when her employer asks her to travel out of town alone with him.
85	22	"Cinderella Update"	Lee Lochhead	Bill Davenport	December 1, 1984	418
After a terrible experience at a singles bar, Jackie considers changing her life by moving to Dallas. However, the change she was looking for unexpectedly comes to her when Sara's date arrives early at the apartment.
86	23	"Henry Bites the Big Apple"	Earl Barret	David Ketchum & Tony DiMarco	December 8, 1984	419
Henry is offered an executive position at a rival comic publisher for double his salary. He lets his enthusiasm get the best of him, however, when he tells off the new editor of Wainwright Publishing before asking where his new job will be located.

=== Season 5 (1985) ===
- Deborah Van Valkenburgh (Jackie Rush) appears in eight of the twenty-one episodes of season 5 ("Drawing Room", "Nearly Departed", "My Son, the PhD", "All in a Day's Unemployment", "And Baby Makes Two", "For Every Man, There's Two Women", "Finders Keepers", "These Stupid Things Remind Me Of You", and "Arrividerci, Jackie").
- Joshua Goodwin takes over the role of Andrew Rush for the remainder of the series, appearing in twelve episodes over the course of the next two seasons.

No. overall	No. in season	Title	Directed by	Written by	Original release date	Prod. code
87	1	"Drawing Room"	Russ Petranto	George Yanok	February 2, 1985	502
Henry is becoming increasing frustrated by Andrew's destructive curiosity, which culminates in him ruining one of Henry's unpublished Cosmic Cow drawings. Mr. Wainwright generously offers Henry his own office, but the transition turns out to be much less ideal than he or Muriel envisioned.
88	2	"Nearly Departed"	Russ Petranto	George Tricker & Neil Rosen	February 9, 1985	501
Upon returning from his father Huey's well attended and upbeat funeral, Henry makes the realization that his own funeral won't be memorable because he only has one close friend, Herb. He decides to ask Herb to deliver his eulogy, which turns out of be a big mistake.
89	3	"My Son, the PhD"	Russ Petranto	Bill Davenport	February 16, 1985	506
Henry and Muriel become excited about the possibility that their son could be a genius when they discover Andrew can read even though he hasn't turned three years old yet. Henry is eager to enroll him in a school for gifted children, but Muriel becomes dead set against it when she learns Andrew would have to live at the school. Note: The school for gifted children that Henry and Muriel try to get Andrew accepted into was named "The Davenport Project", which was named after the episode's writer, Bill Davenport.
90	4	"All in a Day's Unemployment"	Russ Petranto	Al Gordon & Peter Gallay	February 23, 1985	504
Henry is outraged to learn that Monroe took home no pay on his last paycheck due to his employer's frivolous payroll deductions, and convinces him to demand a raise so he can pay the rent. However, the advice backfires when Monroe gets fired, and he becomes a nuisance around the apartment as he makes more money collecting unemployment.
91	5	"Devereaux & Son"	Russ Petranto	George Tricker & Neil Rosen	March 2, 1985	508
While Iris is visiting the Rushes, her scheming former boyfriend Paul shows up and asks her and the Rushes to pose as his wife and family in an attempt to convince his long lost son that he has a stable home life. However, when the man proposes a business venture, Paul soon finds out they both have a lot in common.
92	6	"And Baby Makes Two"	Russ Petranto	Bill Davenport	May 4, 1985	503
Henry is thrilled that Jackie has begun dating Bill St. George again, and can't keep himself from strongly suggesting the couple consider marriage. However, his forcefulness backfires when Jackie announces that she's decided to have a baby with Bill out of wedlock.
93	7	"Reconcilable Differences"	Earl Barret	George Tricker & Neil Rosen	May 11, 1985	515
Henry and Muriel regrettably decide to forego an evening of romance in order to help Herb and his wife Marsha with their marriage problems. The next day, Muriel comes up with a plan to use that disastrous experience to trick Herb and Marsha into seeking professional help.
94	8	"The Two Faces of Muriel"	Peter Baldwin	Rick Sultan & Gary Ress	May 18, 1985	512
Muriel accepts a job offer to do a two-week photo shoot in Palm Springs for a friend who has just had a facelift that makes her look fifteen years younger. Henry is shocked when Muriel returns from the trip with her face wrapped up and proclaiming she's just had a facelift of her own.
95	9	"No Mas, Monroe"	Peter Baldwin	T : Bill Davenport; S/T : Sam Greenbaum	May 25, 1985	513
Muriel hires a housekeeper named Evon, an immigrant from a war-torn Central American country, who is in the United States on a temporary visa. She immediately begins a relationship with Monroe, and tells Muriel that her visa is about to expire and she is in need of a way to stay in the United States. When Monroe announces they are going to get married shortly after her visa expires in order to keep her in the country, Henry fears they may be making a mistake. Note: Guest star Lisa Antille would return as series regular during the sixth and final season (when the series was renamed The Ted Knight Show) as the Rushes' full-time housekeeper Lisa, following Henry, Muriel and Andrew's move to Mill Valley. Antille's character is nearly identical to the one she portrays in this episode, except her name is changed to Lisa, and her relationship with Monroe is only casually flirtatious during that season.
96	10	"For Every Man, There's Two Women"	Russ Petranto	Bill Davenport	July 20, 1985	423
Two women kidnap and blindfold Monroe while he is about to return home from his security guard job at the mall. The women take him to their apartment and rape him. When Henry learns what happened, he is appalled, especially when Muriel, Jackie, and Sara assume that the police will not take Monroe's story seriously because he was raped by women. When the police officer tells Monroe that it would be best not to pursue charges, in order to avoid any unwanted media attention that could result from a trial, Monroe considers dropping the case. Henry convinces Monroe not to give up. Henry and Monroe decide to track down the perpetrators and bring them to justice. Note: Though this episode was broadcast during the fifth season, it was originally produced for the fourth season. Also this episode was banned after its original airing due to the controversial plot and was not seen again until decades later when the show was broadcast on Antenna TV.
97	11	"Finders Keepers"	Earl Barret	Mickey Rose	July 27, 1985	425
Henry and Monroe find a bag containing $110,000 of cash under Henry's car while at the mall. However, a tense situation quickly develops when they can't agree on what should be done with it. Note: Though this episode was broadcast during the fifth season, it was originally produced for the fourth season.
98	12	"These Stupid Things Remind Me of You"	Earl Barret	Arne Sultan & Earl Barret	August 3, 1985	426
In this clip show, Monroe is away taking care of his ill father, and Henry has been feeling depressed. He insists it has nothing to do with Monroe's absence, but his family tries to convince him otherwise through the use of flashbacks. Note: Though this episode was broadcast during the fifth season, it was originally produced for the fourth season; as a result, this episode only features clips from the first four seasons.
99	13	"Terms of Endangerment"	Russ Petranto	Laurie Gelman	September 28, 1985	509
Monroe begins dating a woman named Linda, but the Rushes are shocked to discover she is twice Monroe's age. Henry becomes convinced that Linda is married, but he and Muriel soon learn the truth is much more complicated and possibly putting Monroe in a dangerous situation.
100	14	"The British Are Coming, The British Are Coming"	Russ Petranto	George Tricker & Neil Rosen	October 5, 1985	518
Henry is visited by his woman-chasing British friend Ernie, whom he met while in the Navy and has not seen in 25 years. Muriel sets him up with her recently widowed friend Helen and they hit it off immediately, but Ernie fails to mention that he made the trip alone.
101	15	"No Deposit, No Return"	Peter Baldwin	T : George Tricker & Neil Rosen; S/T : John Antrobus	October 12, 1985	514
While Henry is cleaning out the Rush home, Monroe discovers library books that Henry had checked out five years ago. Henry is determined to avoid paying the enormous fine at all costs, but disposing of the books proves to be much easier said than done.
102	16	"Off and Running"	Peter Baldwin	Jurgen Wolff	October 19, 1985	511
Muriel volunteers to be a campaign photographer for a candidate running for state legislature, and Henry decides to have Cosmic Cow endorse her through a series of playful photographs that end up on the front page of the newspaper. However, he is faced with an ultimatum when Mr. Wainwright informs him he has a pending business partnership with the corrupt incumbent.
103	17	"Accused, Confused and Abused"	Russ Petranto	George Tricker & Neil Rosen	October 26, 1985	505
Monroe brings home a teenage shoplifter named Alan, after convincing his store to drop the charges because of the young man's harsh upbringing. Alan immediately hits it off with the Rushes after demonstrating his guitar skills, but Henry's initial suspicions seem to be confirmed when he disappears with Monroe's guitar.
104	18	"Arrivederci, Jackie"	Russ Petranto	George Yanok	November 2, 1985	507
Jackie is offered a job to work for a fashion designer in Milan, Italy, but lies to her father that she is only going to Italy on vacation. Her prospective new boss comes to meet the Rush family, upon Jackie's invitation, so he can break the news to Henry. However while he does know how to speak English, there is enough of a language barrier to cause a misunderstanding when Henry believes that the man wants Jackie's hand in marriage, causing Henry to throw him out of the apartment and ruin Jackie's chances at landing her dream job.
105	19	"Ars Gratia Iris"	Earl Barret	Bill Davenport	November 9, 1985	516
Iris is put in charge of a committee to select a new logo for her travel agency association, and Muriel inadvertently encourages Henry to create a submission, after Iris makes a demeaning comment about his abilities behind his back. Muriel regrets not trying to dampen Henry's enthusiasm when Iris adamantly refuses to submit Henry's logo regardless of its quality.
106	20	"Henry Enters the '80s"	Russ Petranto	Mike Weinberger	November 16, 1985	510
Muriel sets up Sara on a blind date with an ad agency partner named Bob. On their seventh date, Sara invites Bob to a special dinner in her apartment. When Henry invites himself and Muriel as guests, Henry's fear is confirmed when Sara says she has asked Bob to move in with her.
107	21	"Freddie Loves It, We Love It, You're Cancelled"	Valentine Mayer	George Yanok, Bill Davenport, Aaron Ruben, George Tricker & Neil Rosen	November 23, 1985	517
Henry is elated when Mr. Wainwright announces that a television network is turning his Cosmic Cow comic strip into a Saturday morning animated TV series, leading Henry to get caught up in the glitz and glamour of the prospect. However, when the network decides to make major changes to the show that won't make it stay true to how Henry created the character, that could earn Henry a lot more money, his family fears he may be setting himself up for disappointment.

=== Season 6 (1986–87) ===
- This season, the series was renamed The Ted Knight Show during the original broadcast season, but in reruns the name Too Close for Comfort was used in the titles.
- Lydia Cornell (Sara Rush) and Deborah Van Valkenburgh (Jackie Rush) do not appear this season, while Pat Carroll (Hope Stinson) and Lisa Antille (Lisa Flores) join the cast.

No. overall	No. in season	Title	Directed by	Written by	Original release date	Prod. code
108	1	"Henry's Change of Life"	Peter Baldwin	George Yanok	April 5, 1986	601
Henry, Muriel and Andrew have sold their duplex in San Francisco and move to a new house about twelve miles north in the Marin County community of Mill Valley, and hire a full time housekeeper named Lisa Flores. The move is the result of Henry's purchase of a 49% stake in the town's weekly newspaper, The Marin Bugler, where he becomes its editor and publisher. But the paper's widowed majority owner Hope Stinson, is not too keen on Henry's ideas to make changes at the paper, finding him wanting to back out of the deal.
109	2	"Front Page Monroe"	Earl Barret	Bill Davenport	April 12, 1986	602
While Monroe is alone at the newspaper office, a dock worker storms in wanting to blow the whistle on his employer for dumping chemicals into the Bay. Monroe sees it as his chance to make a name for himself, but has a difficult decision to make when the newspaper is sued and the district attorney demands he name his source for the story.
110	3	"Four Is a Crowd"	Charles S. Dubin	Bill Davenport	April 19, 1986	609
Henry's friend Herb purchases a house in the area, and the Rushes graciously allow him and his wife to spend a few days with them while a problem with the escrow is cleared up. However, their houseguests quickly wear out their welcome. Note: Pat Carroll does not appear
111	4	"Ho-Ho-Ho Chi Henry"	Earl Barret	George Tricker & Neil Rosen	April 26, 1986	603
Henry decides to do a human interest story about the proprietors of a new Vietnamese restaurant and their difficult trip to America. However, he is stunned when the story results in several readers attempting to force the proprietors to close down and leave. Note: Lisa Antille does not appear
112	5	"Miss Marin Bugler"	Peter Baldwin	George Tricker & Neil Rosen	May 3, 1986	605
Henry decides to sponsor a beauty contest in order to increase circulation of the Bugler, much to the chagrin of Mrs. Stinson; but Henry's idea goes awry, when nude photographs photos of the winner of the Miss Marin Bugler pageant, taken when the woman was only 17 years old, surface and a man who has the risque photos attempts to blackmail Henry. Now Henry is faced with the decision as whether or not to pay the man who threatens to leak the photos.
113	6	"Garfield the Cat Joins the Marin Bugler"	Peter Baldwin	George Tricker & Neil Rosen	May 10, 1986	612
Cartoonist Jim Davis guest stars in an episode in which Henry secures the rights to get the Garfield comic strip to the Bugler while at a convention, without clearing it with Mrs. Stinson first. When he informs Mrs. Stinson upon her return from a vacation, he is shocked by her response when Hope rejects Henry's idea due to her dislike of comic strips; but it takes Monroe, who Henry hires to appear in a Garfield suit to promote the comic's appearance in the paper, to convince her to change her mind.
114	7	"Bedtime for Henry"	Peter Baldwin	Harry Karamazov	May 17, 1986	606
A misunderstanding occurs when Henry decides to take the day off from work and stay home in the bedroom for a little rest and relaxation, with strict instructions to Muriel not be disturbed. The odd circumstances lead Monroe, Lisa and Mrs. Stinson to be concerned about his health, threatening to ruin his peace and quiet.
115	8	"Educating Lisa"	Peter Baldwin	George Tricker & Neil Rosen	May 24, 1986	604
Lisa decides to attend a night class to prepare for her citizenship test, but she suddenly wants to quit, claiming she doesn't like the teacher. Henry prods her to continue the class, but he and Muriel are shocked when Lisa finally admits the teacher is sexually harassing her. Note: Pat Carroll does not appear
116	9	"Henry's Novel Solution"	Charles S. Dubin	George Yanok	May 31, 1986	610
Henry is excited to discover his favorite novelist subscribes to his newspaper, and eagerly accepts his offer to write an article during a dinner date. However, Henry finds himself conflicted when he discovers the man does all of his writing while he's drunk.
117	10	"Henry Gets Taken for a Ride"	Charles S. Dubin	George Tricker & Neil Rosen	June 7, 1986	611
When Lisa tries to look for a new car, Henry agrees to loan Lisa money to buy a used car, on the stipulation that he gets to have final say on which one she chooses. Henry doesn't trust a slick car salesman who is trying to sell Lisa the car she wants and takes it upon himself to buy a car for Lisa from an elderly woman, only to discover that it is stolen when Lisa gets arrested.
118	11	"Late, Great Herbert Maxwell"	Peter Baldwin	Jurgen Wolff	July 12, 1986	607
A prominent civic leader in Marin County, Herbert Maxwell, is found dead in his car and Henry is assigned by Mrs. Stinson to write a front page story in tribute to him printed for this week's Bugler. When Henry finds a discrepancy in the police report, in which the time Herbert's secretary said he left work and the time he was found dead are inconsistent, he and Monroe suspect that foul play may be involved, leading them to investigate the situation. But when Henry interviews Mr. Maxwell's secretary to find out what really happened, he finds out that Herbert's secretary lied about when he left work as a way to keep his secret, that she and Herbert have been having an affair. This leads Henry to make the tough decision on whether to print the story of Mr. Maxwell's secret life or to keep the name of Mr. Maxwell untarnished. Note: Lisa Antille does not appear
119	12	"Muriel's Fish Story"	Peter Baldwin	Rich Orloff	July 19, 1986	613
While attending the first exhibition of her photography, Muriel is offered the opportunity to be the official photographer for a French oceanographer's upcoming five week expedition. Although she has doubts about accepting the offer, she sees the situation differently when Henry presumes what her decision will be.
120	13	"Ya Gotta Have Heart"	Peter Baldwin	Bill Davenport	September 27, 1986	608
Mrs. Stinson hires her niece Jennifer as an intern, and immediately begins taking her advice over Henry's. He becomes convinced that she is being groomed to replace him, and is faced with a difficult decision when Jennifer wants him to publish her sub-standard front page story.
121	14	"Monroe's Critical Condition"	Phil Ramuno	Harry Karamazov	October 4, 1986	622
Henry assigns Monroe to be the entertainment critic for the newspaper, and he receives a threatening phone call after writing a scathing review of a lounge singer. Monroe is consumed with fear as the calls continue no matter where he goes, but he becomes determined not to give in to the intimidation.
122	15	"Cyrano Henry"	Phil Ramuno	Bill Davenport	October 11, 1986	621
Henry helps Mr. Forester, an elderly man who occasionally provides Henry with neighborhood gossip, compose a personal ad to find a female companion. Mr. Forester convinces Henry to write romantic correspondence to a respondent on his behalf, only to become irate at Henry when he interprets a response from her as a marriage proposal. Note: Lisa Antille does not appear
123	16	"Family Feud"	Charles S. Dubin	Jerry Rannow	October 18, 1986	618
Muriel is infuriated when Henry passes over her photograph for the front page in favor of a photograph taken by the eight-year-old daughter of the newspaper's biggest advertiser. In retaliation, she decides to resign from her job as the paper's photographer, forcing Henry to use Monroe as a replacement. Note: Lisa Antille does not appear
124	17	"Rock Around Henry"	Phil Ramuno	George Yanok	November 1, 1986	620
When a showcase for rock-and-roll musicians is dropped from an upcoming local music festival by the city council, a famous music duo named Dudley and Bond come to the paper to state their case and asks Henry to print a letter written by them in the paper that he doesn't approve of; Monroe finds out about the two men's plight and has them come to Henry's house, believing he can convince him to write a critical editorial of the decision in the paper, not knowing that Henry already rejected the men's request. Note: The episode was dedicated to the memory of Arne Sultan, who co-developed the series and served as the show's writer and executive producer with Earl Barret until the end of the fourth season; Sultan died in March 1986 at the age of 60.
125	18	"Herb Kisses, Henry Tells"	Earl Barret	Harry Karamazov	November 8, 1986	617
Muriel sees Henry's friend Herb at a restaurant with a woman other than his wife. Herb confides the truth in Henry during a dinner party, but Henry creates a big mess for himself when he inadvertently blurts out the name of the other woman during a toast to the couple.
126	19	"Believing Is Seeing"	Phil Ramuno	Jurgen Wolff	November 15, 1986	614
Mrs. Stinson is diagnosed with cataracts and suddenly decides to retire and travel the world. Henry is thrilled to be put in sole charge of the newspaper, but has second thoughts when he finally learns the reason for her decision.
127	20	"Acropolis Now"	Phil Ramuno	Jurgen Wolff	November 22, 1986	616
Muriel's mother and Henry's mother-in-law Iris returns and announces that she is getting married again. The man and his adult son arrive at Henry's home to meet Iris' daughter and son-in-law, but Henry believes that he is after Iris just for her money. He decides to have a prenuptial agreement drafted for Iris and her fiancé to sign, agreeing for the marrieds-to-be to keep their own monetary assets in case they divorce; what Henry does not know until it is too late is that Iris' new man is actually a wealthy Greek shipping magnate, and with the pre-nup signed, Iris is not entitled to his money if they divorce.
128	21	"Presenting Buddy Ficus"	Phil Ramuno	George Tricker & Neil Rosen	January 31, 1987	619
Monroe reviews a comedy club, and thinks that the comedians at the club were not up to par; he decides to go onstage himself to try his hand at stand-up comedy. On the night Monroe is performing, under the stage name Buddy Ficus, the audience does not think his jokes are funny and everyone (except Muriel, Henry, Hope and Lisa) leave. Monroe falsely thinks he did a great job, and it is up to Henry to tell Monroe that stand-up is not Monroe's forte.
129	22	"Lisa Goes Lottery Loco"	Earl Barret	George Tricker & Neil Rosen	February 7, 1987	615
Everyone but Henry gets caught up in scratch off lottery fever, and Lisa is excited when her single ticket wins $5. However, things quickly get out of hand when she secretly begins spending entire paychecks on more lottery tickets.
