= Gérard de Villiers =

French writer and journalist (1929 - 2013)

- Villiers in 1982
- Born: 8 December 1929; Paris, France
- Died: 31 October 2013 (aged 83); Paris, France
- Occupation: Writer

Gérard de Villiers (French: [ʒeʁaʁ də vilje]; 8 December 1929 – 31 October 2013) was a French writer, journalist and publisher whose SAS series of spy novels have been major bestsellers.

== Life ==
Born in Paris in 1929, Villiers was the son of playwright Jacques Adam de Villiers (known by his stage name of Jacques Deval) and his wife. His father was both prolific and a spendthrift. The younger Villiers attended high school and graduated from Sciences Po university in Paris. He also obtained a degree from the École supérieure de journalisme de Paris.

He began writing during the 1950s for France Soir, a French daily, and became a foreign correspondent. He found "the blend of risk and cold calculation" in intelligence work to be "seductive". In 1964 Villiers began to write and publish spy novels. He had acquaintances among the military and intelligence services who enjoyed helping Villiers describe them and their acts in fiction. He is the author of the spy novel series SAS, publishing his first volume in 1965. It tells the adventures of the Austrian prince and CIA agent Malko Linge, referred to in the first title as "SAS" (Son Altesse Sérénissime i.e. "His Serene Highness").

Villiers wrote 200 SAS novels. De Villiers' books are well known in French-speaking countries for their in-depth insider knowledge of such subjects as espionage, geopolitics, and terrorist threats, as well as their hard-core sex scenes. According to the New York Times, "His works have been translated and are especially popular in Germany, Russia, Turkey, and Japan. The SAS series has sold a reported 120 million copies worldwide, which would make it one of the top-selling series in history, on a par with Ian Fleming's James Bond books. SAS may be the longest-running fiction series ever written by a single author". In addition to France, they were translated and popular in Germany, Russia, Turkey, and Japan; and, since some have been published in English since 2014, in the United States and other English-speaking countries. They are said to be studied by various intelligence services and enjoyed by successive French heads of state.

Villiers published four titles per year between 1966 and 2005, increasing his production to five per year between 2006 and his death in 2013. Usually the locale of the story is featured in the title (as in, Les amazones de Pyongyang' [The Amazons of Pyongyang] or Putsch à Ouagadougou [Coup in Ouagadougou]). Villiers was well known for writing novels that incorporated contemporary events, such as wars or terrorist threats. He frequently visited theaters of operation, doing research and interviews to ground his stories with accurate facts. He typically researched each book for 15 days on location and then wrote it in another six weeks.

His sales were at a maximum during the 1980s, but during the early 21st century Villiers was still earning "between 800,000 and a million euros a year (roughly $1 million to $1.3 million)" for his books. This enabled him to keep a villa in St. Tropez and a "grand house" on Avenue Foch in Paris.

Villiers's mastery of international politics sometimes resulted in his publishing books that seem "prophetic". His Le Chemin de Damas (2012) was set in the middle of Syria's 21st-century civil war, and it described an attack on a government command center near the presidential palace, a month before such an attack took place. In an earlier book, he portrayed the assassination of Egyptian President Anwar Sadat before the fact. Due to tips from spies, he was nearly finished writing SAS: The Hunt for Carlos when the freelance assassin known as Carlos the Jackal was captured.

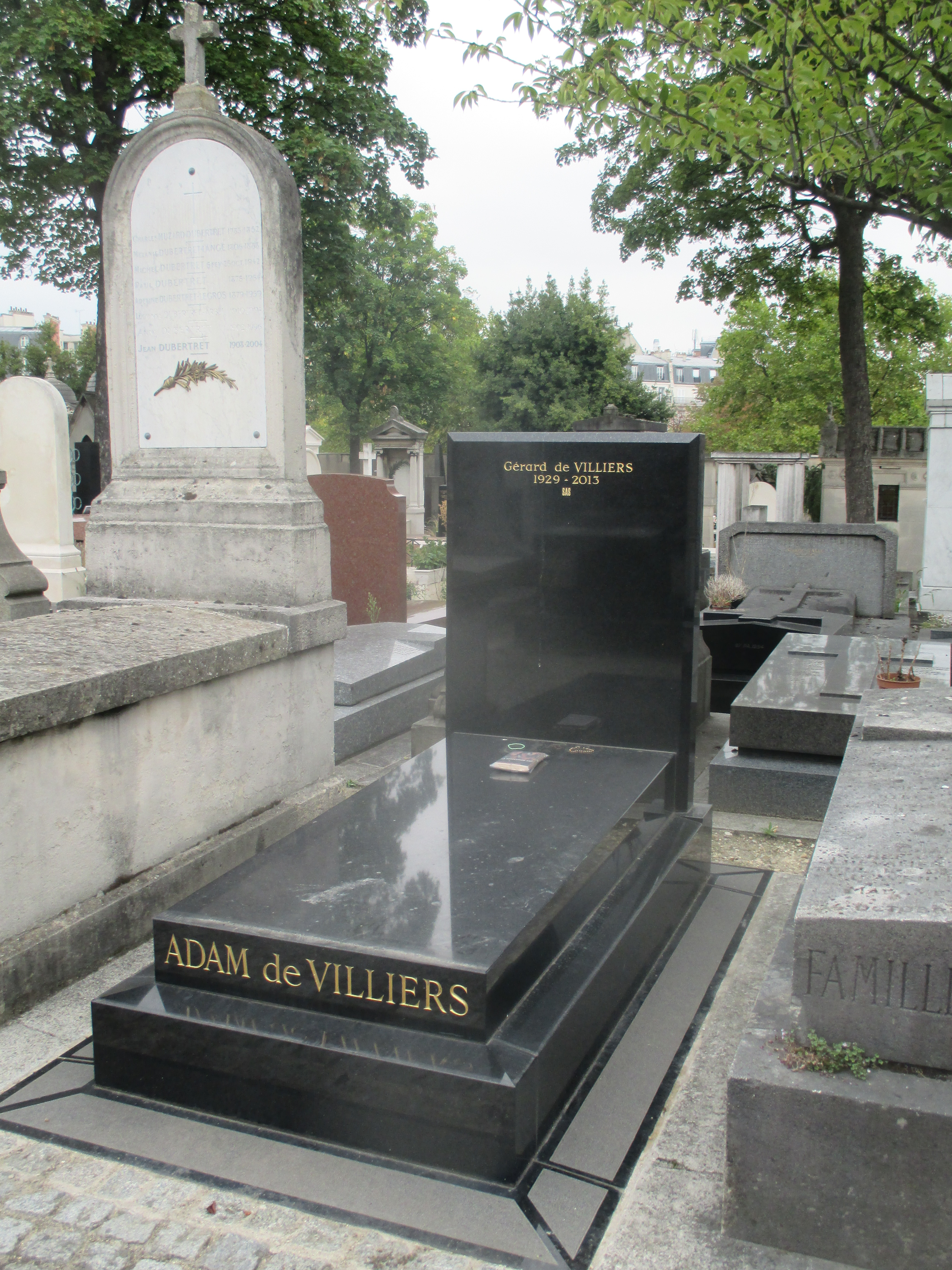
His family plot in cimetière de Passy in Paris; Adam de Villiers was his father.

== English translations ==
During the mid-1970s, Pinnacle Books published a dozen of the early SAS novels in English, which are now out of print. They include The Belfast Connection (ISBN 0-523-00844-9, Furie à Belfast) in 1976.

His 1975 book about the Shah of Iran - L'Irresistible Ascension de Mohammad Reza, Shah d'Iran, co-written with Bernard Touchais and Annick de Villiers, was translated as The Imperial Shah: An Informal Biography (UK: Weidenfeld & Nicolson; US: Little Brown & Co., 1976) by June P. Wilson and Walter B. Michaels.

Between 2014 and 2016, Vintage Books published posthumously five Malko Linge novels: The Madmen of Benghazi (ISBN 978-0-8041-6931-8, Les Fous de Benghazi) and Chaos in Kabul (ISBN 978-0-8041-6933-2, Sauve-qui-peut à Kaboul), followed by three Russia-themed thrillers: Revenge of the Kremlin (ISBN 978-0-8041-6935-6, La Vengeance du Kremlin), Lord of the Swallows (ISBN 978-0-8041-6937-0, Le Maître des hirondelles), and Surface to Air (ISBN 978-0-804-16939-4, Igla S) in late 2016. The books were translated and adapted by French literary translator William Rodarmor.

== Film adaptations ==
His SAS novels have been adapted in both French and English-language productions.

=== SAS ===
- S.A.S. à San Salvador (dir. Raoul Coutard, 1983), with Miles O'Keeffe (as Malko), Raimund Harmstorf, Dagmar Lassander, Anton Diffring, Sybil Danning
- Eye of the Widow (dir. Andrew V. McLaglen, 1991), with Richard Young (as Malko), F. Murray Abraham, Ben Cross, Mel Ferrer, Patrick Macnee

His novels related to the Brigade mondaine of the French national police have also received some adaptations:

- Victims of Vice (dir. Jacques Scandelari, 1978)
- Brigade mondaine : La secte de Marrakech (dir. Eddy Matalon, 1979)
- Brigade mondaine : Vaudou aux Caraïbes (Super Witch of Love Island, dir. Philippe Monnier, 1980)
