= Honeymoon Hotel =

Honeymoon Hotel may refer to:

- Honeymoon Hotel (1934 film), a 1934 Merrie Melodies cartoon
- the American title of Under New Management, a 1946 British musical comedy
- Honeymoon Hotel (1964 film), an MGM comedy starring Robert Goulet and Nancy Kwan
- "Honeymoon Hotel" (The Jeffersons), an episode of The Jeffersons
- "Honeymoon Hotel", a song from the musical film Footlight Parade

== See also ==
- Isabel Sanford's Honeymoon Hotel, an American sitcom
