= Annabel Schofield =

Welsh-born American model and actress (1963–2026)

- Born: 4 September 1963; Llanelli, Wales
- Died: 28 February 2026 (aged 62); Los Angeles, California, U.S.
- Occupations: Model; actress; producer

Annabel Schofield (4 September 1963 – 28 February 2026) was a Welsh-born American model and actress and later a producer.

== Life and career ==
Schofield was born in Llanelli, the daughter of film producer John D. Schofield. She had one sister. At 16, she left for London to become a model, signing with Take Two agency and appearing frequently in Italian Vogue and in television adverts, notably a much viewed advert for Bugle Boy jeans.

She switched her focus from modelling to acting in the mid‑1980s, attending drama school in New York and moving to Los Angeles. In 1988, in her second acting role, she played Laurel Ellis in twelve episodes of Dallas. Her film work included Blood Tide in 1982, her acting debut, Exit in Red in 1996, Midnight Blue in 1997, and Solar Crisis in 1990.

In the 21st century she moved into film producing, as an assistant to her father on The Brothers Grimm, Doom (both 2005) and City of Ember (2008) and from 2010 with her own company, Bella Bene Productions, where she focussed on advertising, fashion and music videos and partnered on many projects with Nick Egan. Her semi-autobiographical novel The Cherry Alignment was published in 2013, arising out of a blog of the same name.

Schofield was diagnosed with cancer in the 2020s and underwent surgery in 2023. She died in Los Angeles on 28 February 2026, at the age of 62, after brain surgery the previous month funded by a crowdfunding campaign.

== Filmography ==
=== Film ===
- 1982 Blood Tide as Vikki
- 1988 Dragonard as Honore Juno
- 1990 Solar Crisis as Dr. Alex Noffe
- 1991 Eye of the Widow as Sharnilar Khasani
- 1994 Clifford as Woman At Party
- 1996 Exit in Red as Ally Mercer
- 1997 The Protector as Marisa
- 1997 Midnight Blue as Martine / Georgine
- 2000 A Man Is Mostly Water

=== Television ===
- 1988 Dallas (12 episodes) as Laurel Ellis
- 1992 Dangerous Curves (1 episode) as Caroline Fowler
