= SAS (novel series) =

Series of espionage novels by Gérard de Villiers

SAS novels
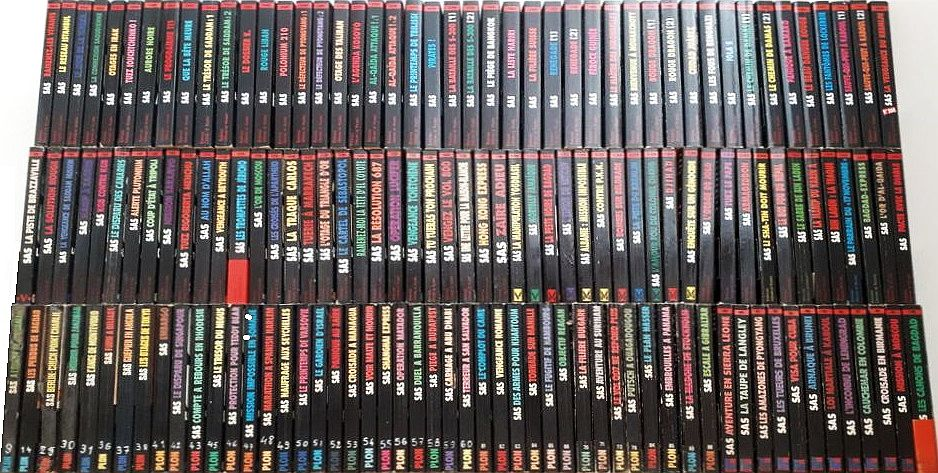
- Author: Gérard de Villiers
- Country: France
- Language: French
- Genre: Spy fiction
- Published: 1965–2013
- Media type: Print (paperback)
- No. of books: 200

Son Altesse Sérénissime (His Serene Highness) or SAS is a series of espionage novels created by French author Gérard de Villiers, featuring Austrian prince Malko Linge as the main character. More than 120 million copies have been sold globally, mostly in French, scoring in the top 25 of the best-selling book series of all time, behind Frédéric Dard's San-Antonio with 200 million copies sold worldwide.

Since 2006, the novels have been published as comic books, though intended chiefly for adults given their contents of violence and sex.

The novel's title is a play on initialisms: Son Altesse Sérénissime (SAS) is the French version of "His Serene Highness" (HSH); and the British Special Air Service (SAS) is the principal special forces unit of the British Army.

In 2014, Vintage Books published posthumously English versions of The Madmen of Benghazi and Chaos in Kabul, translated and adapted by William Rodarmor. The publisher released three other books in English through 2016.

== Background ==
Gérard de Villiers was a correspondent for France-Soir and other newspapers. He began writing the SAS novels in 1964, when an editor told him that Ian Fleming had died and that de Villiers might create the next James Bond. He succeeded; as of January 2013 the series had sold about 100 million copies worldwide, comparable to the Bond series. It may be the longest book series in history written by one person.

Government officials and intelligence officers, who enjoyed seeing themselves fictionalized and reading about events they could not reveal publicly, told de Villiers secrets that appeared in SAS, making the series' plots and settings unusually realistic. The books predicted some events such as the capture of Carlos the Jackal, assassination of Anwar Sadat, and events of the Syrian Civil War. Robert F. Worth, former Beirut bureau chief for The New York Times, was amazed to read in La Liste Hariri details of the assassination of Rafic Hariri that no journalist knew when the book appeared. A Lebanese intelligence officer who wanted to reveal information but did not trust journalists (including Worth) helped de Villiers, the novelist said.

Hubert Védrine said that while Foreign Minister, before visiting a country he read SAS novels to learn what French intelligence believed about it. While the books' many detailed sex scenes give the series a poor literary reputation, "the French elite pretend not to read him, but they all do", Védrine said.

== Plot ==
In order to finance the repairs of his castle in Liezen, Austria, main character Malko Linge works as a freelance agent for the CIA of the United States. The CIA sends him on dangerous missions all over the world. He has an excellent memory and speaks several languages fluently. He is very well-groomed, preferring to wear tailor-made alpaca suits. He carries a compact gun.

== Recurring characters ==
The following supporting characters appear regularly in the S.A.S. espionage novels:

- Samantha Adler : A German brunette and arms dealer.
- Mandy Brown aka Mandy la salope (Mandy the bitch) : An American woman.
- Frank Capistrano : Italian American who is a special advisor to the President of the USA.
- Elko Krisantem : Turkish servant of Malko Linge. He used to be a killer.
- Alexandra Vogel : Malko's fiancée.
- Milton Brabeck : A CIA agent who protects Malko on several missions. Partner of Chris Jones.
- Chris Jones : A CIA agent who protects Malko on several missions. Partner of Milton Brabeck.

== List of novels ==
1. SAS à Istanbul, Plon / Presses de la Cité, 1965
2. S.A.S. contre C.I.A., Plon / Presses de la Cité, 1965.
  Malko versus the CIA, 1974.
3. Opération Apocalypse, Plon / Presses de la Cité, 1965
  Operation Apocalypse, 1968.
4. Samba pour SAS, Plon / Presses de la Cité, 1966
5. Rendez-vous à San Francisco, Plon / Presses de la Cité, 1966
6. Le Dossier Kennedy, Plon / Presses de la Cité, 1967
7. SAS broie du noir, Plon / Presses de la Cité, 1967
  The Countess and the Spy, 1974.
8. SAS aux Caraïbes, Plon / Presses de la Cité, 1967
9. SAS à l'ouest de Jérusalem, Plon / Presses de la Cité, 1967
  West of Jerusalem, 1969.
10. L'Or de la rivière Kwaï, Plon / Presses de la Cité, 1968.
  Death on the River Kwai, 1975.
11. Magie noire à New York, Plon / Presses de la Cité, 1968.
  Black Magic in New York, 1970
  Operation New York, 1973.
12. Les Trois Veuves de Hong Kong, Plon / Presses de la Cité, 1968
13. L'Abominable Sirène, Plon / Presses de la Cité, 1969
14. Les Pendus de Bagdad, Plon / Presses de la Cité, 1969
15. La Panthère d'Hollywood, Plon / Presses de la Cité, 1969
16. Escale à Pago-Pago, Plon / Presses de la Cité, 1969
17. Amok à Bali, Plon / Presses de la Cité, 1970
18. Que viva Guevara, Plon / Presses de la Cité, 1970
  Que Viva Guevara, 1975
19. Cyclone à l'ONU, Plon / Presses de la Cité, 1970
20. Mission à Saïgon, Plon / Presses de la Cité, 1970
21. Le Bal de la comtesse Adler, Plon / Presses de la Cité, 1971
  The Countess And The Spy, 1974
22. Les Parias de Ceylan, Plon / Presses de la Cité, 1971
23. Massacre à Amman, Plon / Presses de la Cité, 1971
24. Requiem pour Tontons Macoutes, Plon / Presses de la Cité, 1971
25. L'Homme de Kabul, Plon / Presses de la Cité, 1972
  Man From Kabul, 1973
26. Mort à Beyrouth, Plon / Presses de la Cité, 1972
27. Safari à La Paz, Plon / Presses de la Cité, 1972
28. L'Héroïne de Vientiane, Plon / Presses de la Cité, 1972
29. Berlin : Check-point Charlie, Plon / Presses de la Cité, 1973
  Check-point Charlie, 1975
30. Mourir pour Zanzibar, Plon / Presses de la Cité, 1973
31. L'Ange de Montevideo, Plon / Presses de la Cité, 1973
  Angel of Vengeance, 1974
32. Murder Inc., Las Vegas, Plon / Presses de la Cité, 1973
33. Rendez-vous à Boris Gleb, Plon / Presses de la Cité, 1974
34. Kill Henry Kissinger !, Plon / Presses de la Cité, 1974.
  Kill Kissinger, 1974.
35. Roulette cambodgienne, Plon / Presses de la Cité, 1974
36. Furie à Belfast, Plon / Presses de la Cité, 1974
  The Belfast connection, 1976
37. Guêpier en Angola, Plon / Presses de la Cité, 1975
38. Les Otages de Tokyo, Plon / Presses de la Cité, 1975
  Hostage in Tokyo, 1975
39. L'ordre règne à Santiago, Plon / Presses de la Cité, 1975
  Death in Santiago, 1976
40. Les Sorciers du Tage, Plon / Presses de la Cité, 1975
  The Portuguese defection, 1977
41. Embargo, Plon / Presses de la Cité, 1976
42. Le Disparu de Singapour, Plon / Presses de la Cité, 1976
43. Compte à rebours en Rhodésie, Plon / Presses de la Cité, 1976
44. Meurtre à Athènes, Plon / Presses de la Cité, 1976
45. Le Trésor du Négus, Plon / Presses de la Cité, 1977
46. Protection pour Teddy Bear, Plon / Presses de la Cité, 1977
47. Mission impossible en Somalie, Plon / Presses de la Cité, 1977
48. Marathon à Spanish Harlem, Plon / Presses de la Cité, 1977
49. Naufrage aux Seychelles, Plon / Presses de la Cité, 1978
50. Le Printemps de Varsovie, Plon / Presses de la Cité, 1978
51. Le Gardien d'Israël, Plon / Presses de la Cité, 1978
52. Panique au Zaïre, Plon / Presses de la Cité, 1978
53. Croisade à Managua, Plon / Presses de la Cité, 1979
54. Voir Malte et mourir, Plon / Presses de la Cité, 1979
55. Shangaï Express, Plon / Presses de la Cité, 1979
56. Opération Matador, Plon / Presses de la Cité, 1979
57. Duel à Barranquilla, Plon / Presses de la Cité, 1980
58. Piège à Budapest, Plon / Presses de la Cité, 1980
59. Carnage à Abu Dhabi, Plon / Presses de la Cité, 1980
60. Terreur à San Salvador, Plon / Presses de la Cité, 1980
  A Game of Eyes Only, 1986
61. Le Complot du Caïre, Plon / Presses de la Cité, 1981
62. Vengeance romaine, Plon / Presses de la Cité, 1981
63. Des armes pour Khartoum, Plon / Presses de la Cité, 1981
64. Tornade sur Manille, Plon / Presses de la Cité, 1981
65. Le Fugitif de Hambourg, Plon / Presses de la Cité, 1982
66. Objectif Reagan, Plon / Presses de la Cité, 1982
67. Rouge grenade, Plon / Presses de la Cité, 1982
68. Commando sur Tunis, Plon / Presses de la Cité, 1982
69. Le Tueur de Miami, Plon / Presses de la Cité, 1983
70. La Filière bulgare, Plon / Presses de la Cité, 1983
71. Aventure au Surinam, Plon / Presses de la Cité, 1983
72. Embuscade à la Khyber Pass, Plon / Presses de la Cité, 1983
73. Le Vol 007 ne répond plus, Plon / Presses de la Cité, 1984
74. Les Fous de Baalbek, Plon / Presses de la Cité, 1984
75. Les Enragés d'Amsterdam, Plon / Presses de la Cité, 1984
76. Putsch à Ouagadougou, Plon / Presses de la Cité, 1984
77. La Blonde de Pretoria, Plon / Presses de la Cité, 1985
78. La Veuve de l'Ayatollah, Plon / Presses de la Cité, 1985
79. Chasse à l'homme au Pérou, Plon / Presses de la Cité, 1985
80. L'affaire Kirsanov, Plon / Presses de la Cité, 1985
81. Mort à Gandhi, Plon / Presses de la Cité, 1986
82. Danse macabre à Belgrade, Plon / Presses de la Cité, 1986
83. Coup d'État au Yémen, Plon / Presses de la Cité, 1986
84. Le Plan Nasser, Plon / Presses de la Cité, 1986
85. Embrouilles à Panama, Plon / Presses de la Cité, 1987
86. La Madone de Stockholm, Plon / Presses de la Cité, 1987
87. L'Otage d'Oman, Plon / Presses de la Cité, 1987
88. Escale à Gibraltar, Plon / Presses de la Cité, 1987
89. Aventure en Sierra Leone, Éditions Gérard de Villiers, 1988
90. La Taupe de Langley, Éditions Gérard de Villiers, 1988
91. Les Amazones de Pyongyang, Éditions Gérard de Villiers, 1988
92. Les Tueurs de Bruxelles, Éditions Gérard de Villiers, 1988
93. Visa pour Cuba, Éditions Gérard de Villiers, 1989
94. Arnaque à Brunei, Éditions Gérard de Villiers, 1989
95. Loi martiale à Kaboul, Éditions Gérard de Villiers, 1989
96. L'Inconnu de Leningrad, Éditions Gérard de Villiers, 1989
97. Cauchemar en Colombie, Éditions Gérard de Villiers, 1989
98. Croisade en Birmanie, Éditions Gérard de Villiers, 1990
99. Mission à Moscou, Éditions Gérard de Villiers, 1990
100. Les Canons de Bagdad, Éditions Gérard de Villiers, 1990
101. La Piste de Brazzaville, Éditions Gérard de Villiers, 1991
102. La Solution rouge, Éditions Gérard de Villiers, 1991
103. La Vengeance de Saddam Hussein, Éditions Gérard de Villiers, 1991
104. Manip à Zagreb, Éditions Gérard de Villiers, 1992
105. KGB contre KGB, Éditions Gérard de Villiers, 1992
106. Le Disparu des Canaries, Éditions Gérard de Villiers, 1992
107. Alerte Plutonium, Éditions Gérard de Villiers, 1992
108. Coup d'État à Tripoli, Éditions Gérard de Villiers, 1992
109. Mission Sarajevo, Éditions Gérard de Villiers, 1993
110. Tuez Rigoberta Menchu, Éditions Gérard de Villiers, 1993
111. Au nom d'Allah, Éditions Gérard de Villiers, 1993
112. Vengeance à Beyrouth, Éditions Gérard de Villiers, 1993
113. Les Trompettes de Jéricho, Éditions Gérard de Villiers, 1994
114. L'Or de Moscou, Éditions Gérard de Villiers, 1994
115. Les Croisés de l'Apartheid, Éditions Gérard de Villiers, 1994
116. La Traque Carlos, Éditions Gérard de Villiers, 1994
117. Tuerie à Marrakech, Éditions Gérard de Villiers, 1995
118. L'Otage du triangle d'or, Éditions Gérard de Villiers, 1995
119. Le Cartel de Sébastopol, Éditions Gérard de Villiers, 1995
120. Ramenez-moi la tête d'El Coyote, Éditions Gérard de Villiers, 1995
121. La Résolution 687, Éditions Gérard de Villiers, 1996
122. Opération Lucifer, Éditions Gérard de Villiers, 1996
123. Vengeance tchétchène, Éditions Gérard de Villiers, 1996
124. Tu tueras ton prochain, Éditions Gérard de Villiers, 1996
125. Vengez le vol 800, Éditions Gérard de Villiers, 1997
126. Une lettre pour la Maison-Blanche, Éditions Gérard de Villiers, 1997
127. Hong Kong express, Éditions Gérard de Villiers, 1997
128. Zaïre adieu, Éditions Gérard de Villiers, 1997
129. La Manipulation Yggdrasil, Éditions Malko productions, 1998
130. Mortelle Jamaïque, Éditions Malko productions, 1998
131. La Peste noire de Bagdad, Éditions Malko productions, 1998
132. L'Espion du Vatican, Éditions Malko productions, 1998
133. Albanie, mission impossible, Éditions Malko productions, 1999
134. La Source Yahalom, Éditions Malko productions, 1999
135. Contre P.K.K., Éditions Malko productions, 1999
136. Bombes sur Belgrade, Éditions Malko productions, 1999
137. La Piste du Kremlin, Éditions Malko productions, 2000
138. L'Amour fou du Colonel Chang, Éditions Malko productions, 2000
139. Djihad, Éditions Malko productions, 2000
140. Enquête sur un génocide, Éditions Malko productions, 2000
141. L'Otage de Jolo, Éditions Gérard de Villiers, 2001
142. Tuez le Pape, Éditions Gérard de Villiers, 2001
143. Armageddon, Éditions Gérard de Villiers, 2001
144. Li Sha-Tin doit mourir, Éditions Gérard de Villiers, 2001
145. Le Roi fou du Népal, Éditions Gérard de Villiers, 2002
146. Le Sabre de Bin Laden, Éditions Gérard de Villiers, 2002
147. La Manip du Karin A, Éditions Gérard de Villiers, 2002
148. Bin Laden, la traque, Éditions Gérard de Villiers, 2002
149. Le Parrain du 17 novembre, Éditions Gérard de Villiers, 2003
150. Bagdad-Express, Éditions Gérard de Villiers, 2003
151. L'Or d'Al-Qaida, Éditions Gérard de Villiers, 2003
152. Pacte avec le diable, Éditions Gérard de Villiers, 2003
153. Ramenez les vivants, Éditions Gérard de Villiers, 2004
154. Le Réseau Istanbul, Éditions Gérard de Villiers, 2004
155. Le Jour de la Tcheka, Éditions Gérard de Villiers, 2004
156. La Connexion saoudienne, Éditions Gérard de Villiers, 2004
157. Otages en Irak, Éditions Gérard de Villiers, 2005
158. Tuez Iouchtchenko, Éditions Gérard de Villiers, 2005
159. Mission : Cuba, Éditions Gérard de Villiers, 2005
160. Aurore noire, Éditions Gérard de Villiers, 2005
161. Le Programme 111, Éditions Gérard de Villiers, 2006
162. Que la bête meure, Éditions Gérard de Villiers, 2006
163. Le Trésor de Saddam : 1, Éditions Gérard de Villiers, 2006
164. Le Trésor de Saddam : 2, Éditions Gérard de Villiers, 2006
165. Le Dossier K, Éditions Gérard de Villiers, 2006
166. Rouge Liban, Éditions Gérard de Villiers, 2007
167. Polonium 210, Éditions Gérard de Villiers, 2007
168. Le Défecteur de Pyongyang : 1, Éditions Gérard de Villiers, 2007
169. Le Défecteur de Pyongyang : 2, Éditions Gérard de Villiers, 2007
170. Otage des Taliban, Éditions Gérard de Villiers, 2007
171. L'Agenda Kosovo, Éditions Gérard de Villiers, 2008
172. Retour à Shangri-La, Éditions Gérard de Villiers, 2008
173. Al-Qaïda attaque : 1, Éditions Gérard de Villiers, 2008
174. Al-Qaïda attaque : 2, Éditions Gérard de Villiers, 2008
175. Tuez le Dalaï-Lama, Éditions Gérard de Villiers, 2008
176. Le Printemps de Tbilissi, Éditions Gérard de Villiers, 2009
177. Pirates, Éditions Gérard de Villiers, 2009
178. La Bataille des S-300 : 1, Éditions Gérard de Villiers, 2009
179. La Bataille des S-300 : 2, Éditions Gérard de Villiers, 2009
180. Le Piège de Bangkok, Éditions Gérard de Villiers, 2009
181. La Liste Hariri, Éditions Gérard de Villiers, 2010
182. La Filière suisse, Éditions Gérard de Villiers, 2010
183. Renegade : 1, Éditions Gérard de Villiers, 2010
184. Renegade : 2, Éditions Gérard de Villiers, 2010
185. Féroce Guinée, Éditions Gérard de Villiers, 2010
186. Le Maître des hirondelles, Éditions Gérard de Villiers, 2011
  Lord of the Swallows, 2016
187. Bienvenue à Nouakchott, Éditions Gérard de Villiers, 2011
188. Rouge Dragon : 1, Éditions Gérard de Villiers, 2011
189. Rouge Dragon : 2, Éditions Gérard de Villiers, 2011
190. Ciudad Juárez, Éditions Gérard de Villiers, 2011
191. Les Fous de Benghazi, Éditions Gérard de Villiers, 2012.
  The Madmen of Benghazi, 2014.
192. Igla S, Éditions Gérard de Villiers, 2012.
  Surface to Air, 2016.
193. Le Chemin de Damas : 1, Éditions Gérard de Villiers, 2012
194. Le Chemin de Damas : 2, Éditions Gérard de Villiers, 2012
195. Panique à Bamako, Éditions Gérard de Villiers, 2012
196. Le Beau Danube rouge, Éditions Gérard de Villiers, 2013
197. Les fantômes de Lockerbie, Éditions Gérard de Villiers, 2013
198. Sauve-qui-peut à Kaboul : 1, Éditions Gérard de Villiers, 2013
199. Sauve-qui-peut à Kaboul : 2, Éditions Gérard de Villiers, 2013
  Chaos in Kabul, 2014.
200. La Vengeance du Kremlin, Éditions Gérard de Villiers, 2013.
  Revenge of the Kremlin, 2015.

== Movies ==
Some books have been turned into movies.

- S.A.S. à San Salvador (1982) (IMDB) featuring Miles O'Keeffe as Malko. Based on the novel S.A.S. à San Salvador.
- Eye of the Widow (1989) (IMDB) featuring Richard Young as Malko. Based on the books Vengeance Romaine and La veuve de l'ayatollah.
