= Monika Kaelin =

Swiss model and actress

- Born: October 13, 1954 (age 71); Schwyz, Switzerland
- Spouse: Fritz Künzli

Monika Kaelin (born October 13, 1954) is a Swiss model and actress. She was Penthouse Pet of the Month in May 1980.

== Life ==
She was born in Schwyz. She worked at the Ingenbohl monastery in the canton of Schwyz as a trained kindergarten teacher where she used to attend the seminar at the Theresianum secondary school . She also studied singing and violin at the conservatory. She was discovered early on as a photo model. In 1975 she met football idol Fritz Künzli (44 international matches) in a Zurich night club. The couple married on August 24, 1985, later divorced, but stayed together. Künzli died in 2019 at the age of 73 from the consequences of dementia.

Kaelin took part in the Grand Prix of Folk Music in 1987. In the 1990s she directed the Bernhard Theater in Zurich. She has been President of the Prix Walo since 1998. Kaelin made several films and was often on musical stages.

== Filmography ==
- Frauen im Liebeslager (1977)
- Mädchen nach Mitternacht (1981)
- S.A.S. à San Salvador (1983)
- Plem, Plem – Die Schule brennt (1983)
- Gefährliche Straßen (1991)
- Schöni Uussichte - Bienvenidos in Europa (2006)
