= Mary Louise Weller =

American actress (1946–2026)

- Weller in 1980
- Born: October 2, 1946; New York City, U.S.
- Died: October 1, 2026 (aged 79)
- Occupation: Actress
- Years active: 1972–1983

Mary Louise Weller (October 2, 1946 – October 1, 2026) was an American actress. She is perhaps best known for her role as Mandy Pepperidge in the 1978 film Animal House. Weller guest-starred in television series such as Starsky & Hutch, Fantasy Island, B.J. and the Bear, Supertrain, and CHiPs, and appeared in Larry Cohen's film Q (1982).

== Life and career ==
Mary Louise Weller was born in New York City on October 2, 1946, to Alexander L. Weller (1897–1979) and Annette (née Donay; 1909–1990). She was raised in Los Angeles's Westwood area. Weller was of Lithuanian-Jewish descent. Actor-comedian Danny Kaye was her godfather.

The onetime top New York model made her film debut with the role in the 1972 American political comedy film Hail!. In 1978, Weller starred as a marine biologist in the TV film Hunters of the Reef (1978) and then as Professor Andrew Prine's college-student lover in the horror film The Evil (1978). Weller is best-known for her performance as sorority girl Mandy Pepperidge in the classic comedy film National Lampoon's Animal House (1978). After Animal House, Weller appeared in The Bell Jar (1979), Once Upon a Spy (1980), Forced Vengeance (1982), Blood Tide (1982), and Q (1982).

She acted in several plays in New York City and wrote the play Four Alone, which was performed at the Greenhouse Theater in Pasadena, California. She trained with the U.S. Equestrian Team as a teenager and participated in horse-riding competitions.

Weller died on October 1, 2026, one day before her 80th birthday.

== Filmography ==
=== Films ===
Year	Title	Role	Notes
1972	Hail!	Mrs. Ellison	
1973	Serpico	Sally (party guest)	uncredited
1978	The Evil	Laurie Belman	
1978	National Lampoon's Animal House	Mandy Pepperidge	
1979	The Bell Jar	Doreen	
1982	Forced Vengeance	Claire Bonner	
1982	Q	Mrs. Pauley	
1982	Blood Tide	Sherry Grice	

=== Television ===
Year	Title	Role	Notes
1977	Calling Dr. Storm, M.D.	Venessa Standak	TV movie
1977	Baretta	Rosalind	Episode: "All That Shatters"
1978	Kojak	Stacy	Episode: "May the Horse Be with You"
1978	CHiPS	Carol	Episode: "High Flyer"
1978	Hunters of the Reef	Tracey Russell	TV movie
1978	Starsky & Hutch	Dolly Ivers	Episode: "Moonshine"
1978	The Hardy Boys/Nancy Drew Mysteries	Annie Metzger	Episode: "Gameplan"
1979	Supertrain	Ali	Episode: "The Queen and the Improbable Knight"
1979	Fantasy Island	Tina Mason	Episode: "Yesterday's Love/Fountain of Youth"
1979	B. J. and the Bear	Elizabeth Chambers	Episode: "Deadly Cargo"
1979	Detective School	Cora	Episode: "Nick Is Smitten"
1980	Semi-Tough	Barbara Jane Bookman	Episode: "Barbara Jane Moves In" (pilot)
1980	Vega$	Jamie Randall	Episode: "Lost Monday"
1980	Fantasy Island	Dulcinea "Dulcie" Merchant	Episode: "Don Quixote/The Sex Symbol"
1980	Once Upon a Spy	Paige Tannehill	TV movie
1981	CHiPS	Paula	Episode: "Forty Tons of Trouble"
1983	Quincy, M.E.	Dr. Wendy Peterman	Episode: "The Cutting Edge"
