= S.A.S. à San Salvador =

- Directed by: Raoul Coutard
- Screenplay by: Gérard de Villiers
- Based on: Gérard de Villiers
- Produced by: Artur Brauner; Raymond Danon; Gérard de Villiers
- Starring: Miles O'Keeffe; Raimund Harmstorf; Sybil Danning
- Cinematography: Georges Liron
- Edited by: Hélène Plemiannikov
- Music by: Michel Magne
- Release date: February 25, 1983 (Germany)
- Running time: 95
- Countries: France; Germany
- Languages: French; German; English

S.A.S. à San Salvador (German title: S.A.S. Malko, im Auftrag des Pentagon) is a 1983 international co-production film adaptation of Gérard de Villiers' novel of the same name. The film was directed by Raoul Coutard. It starred Miles O'Keeffe as Son Altesse Sérénissime Malko, the debonair polyglot hero of a long-lived (1965-2013) series of altogether 200 spy novels.

== Plot ==
Like in the books Malko is a nobleman whose family bequeathed him a huge castle and an aristocratic appearance but no sufficient means to sustain the inherited premises or to keep up the appropriate life style. This time it is the castle's roof that requires work and forces Malko to accept another CIA mission. The secret service is worried about rumours which endanger the US-American reputation. It was brought to the CIA's notice that a former collaborator named Enrique Chacon (Raimund Harmstorff) allegedly went rogue in San Salvador. Malko is supposed to investigate Chacon over the atrocities of death squads (the opening scene of the film shows Chacon as the assassin of Óscar Romero) and then do whatever seems fit against the background of his findings. So he travels to San Salvador and goes about it. Soon he becomes a witness to the crimes of the death squads and eventually he has to realise how Chacon is indeed the driving force for all that. That leaves him no other choice than to render Chacon harmless for good before he can return to his castle and his fiancée, Countess Alexandra (Sybil Danning).

== Background ==
In 1983 spy films were popular that there were two James Bond films released the same year – Never Say Never Again (starring Sean Connery) and Octopussy (starring Roger Moore) – while George Lazenby played "J.B." in Return of the Man from U.N.C.L.E. made for television movie. Neither Bond film was considered realistic or closely aligned with Ian Fleming work, who had once created this hero. The success of novels about Malko showed there was a market for adventures of a gentleman spy who refrained from gadgets. Moreover, Malko's creator Gérard de Villiers would ostentatiously write the script and be one of the producers for all to see that this film was in accordance with his novels. Despite these efforts, S.A.S. à San Salvador didn't establish a new series of spy films but the series of novels lived on all the same, and one-time "Malko" Miles O'Keeffe starred the very next year with Sean Connery in Sword of the Valiant.

== Reception ==
S.A.S. à San Salvador ranked 58th at the 1982 French box office, with 738,685 admissions. In Germany, where it released in early 1983, the film drew a further 250,871 admissions and ranked 65th at the yearly box office.

== DVD release ==
Originally released on Betamax and VHS, the film came out on DVD in 2000.

== Cast ==
- Miles O'Keeffe as Malko Linge
- Raimund Harmstorf as Enrique Chacon
- Dagmar Lassander as Maria Luisa Delgado
- Anton Diffring as Peter Reynolds
- Catherine Jarrett as Rosa
- Monika Kaelin as Pilar
- Alexander Kerst as David Wise
- Corinne Touzet as Elena
- Sybil Danning as Countess Alexandra Vogel
- Franck-Olivier Bonnet as Colonel Mendoza
- Robert Etcheverry as Numez Grande
- Wolfgang Finck as Bart Roch
- Didier Bourdon

== Discography ==
The CD soundtrack composed by Michel Magne is available on Music Box Records label (website).
