= Eye of the Widow =

- French: SAS : L'Œil de la veuve
- Directed by: Andrew V. McLaglen
- Written by: Joshua Sauli
- Based on: SAS by Gérard de Villiers
- Produced by: Daniel Carrillo
- Starring: F. Murray Abraham; Ben Cross; Annabel Schofield; Mel Ferrer; Patrick Macnee; Richard Young
- Cinematography: Arthur Wooster
- Edited by: Luce Grunenwaldt
- Music by: Yvan Jullien; Hubert Rostaing
- Production company: Adlar Productions
- Distributed by: Eridan Films (France); Concorde Film (Netherlands)
- Release date: October 17, 1991
- Running time: 90 minutes
- Country: France; Netherlands; Germany; United States
- Language: English

Eye of the Widow (French: SAS : L'Œil de la veuve, lit. 'SAS: Eye of the Widow') is a 1991 spy action film directed by Andrew V. McLaglen, starring Richard Young as Gérard de Villiers' fictional secret agent Prince Malko Linge. The cast also features F. Murray Abraham, Annabel Schofield, Mel Ferrer, Ben Cross, and Patrick Macnee. The screenplay is adapted from Villiers' novels Vengeance romaine (1981) and La Veuve de l'Ayatollah (1985).

The film was an international co-production between French, Dutch, West German, and American companies. It was released in France on October 17, 1991, and was the last film of McLaglen's career.

== Plot ==
The movie starts with the dangerous and cold-blooded arms dealer Kharoun, who is getting rid of his competitors and adversaries with his army of highly trained killers. The next one on his list is Prince Malko, which location he already has tracked down and planned to attack. But Malko survives the bombing of his castle and flees to the CIA headquarters in New York where he learns that Kharoun owns the serum for a biological mass destruction weapon. After a second murder attempt on Malko, he decides to face Kharoun and goes in for a counterattack.

== Cast ==
- Richard Young as Prince Malko Linge
- F. Murray Abraham as Kharoun
- Annabel Schofield as Sharnilar Khasani
- Mel Ferrer as Doug Frankenheimer
- Ben Cross as Nassiri
- Terence Ford as Milton Brabeck
- Rick Hill as Chris Jones
- Felicity Dean as Victoria
- Ashley Richardson as Ingrid
- Aharon Ipalé as Golan Soltaneh
- Paul L. Smith as Elko Krisantem
- Patrick Macnee as Andrew Marcus
- Charles Millot as Carlos
- Mike Marshall as Klaus
- Susannah Hoffmann as Countess Alexandra
- Sacha Briquet as Cardinal
- Benjamin Feitelson as Kashani
- Nabila Khashoggi as Vanya
- Elvira Neustaedtl as Anna
- Erwin Strahl as Frans
- Norbert Blecha as Werner
- Ken Kirzinger as Gabrisky
- Jeffrey Nordling as FBI Agent
- Terry David Mulligan as Mac Carthy
- Gregory Dark as Messenger

== Release ==
Eye of the Widow was released in France on October 17, 1991. In the Philippines, the film was released with the same name on October 14, 1992.
