= Exit in Red =

- Directed by: Yurek Bogayevicz
- Written by: David Womark
- Produced by: Steven Paul; Carol Kottenbrook; Scott Einbinder
- Starring: Mickey Rourke; Annabel Schofield; Anthony Michael Hall
- Cinematography: Ericson Core
- Release date: 1996
- Running time: 97 minutes
- Country: United States

Exit in Red is a 1996 American thriller drama film directed by Yurek Bogayevicz and starring Mickey Rourke, Annabel Schofield, Carré Otis, and Anthony Michael Hall.

== Plot ==
Psychiatrist Ed Altman moves to Palm Springs, California, after the suicide of one of his patients. He is charged with professional misconduct, and is trying to avoid litigation. He gets involved with a married woman, Ally Mercer, who has her own motives for the relationship with Altman. She is planning, along with her other lover Nick, to frame Ed for the murder of her husband. When Ed finds out that Nick is complicit in the scheme, he shoots him in the nose. It ends up being a triple-cross by Ally, which results in a shootout, with Ed being the only survivor.

== Cast ==
- Mickey Rourke
- Annabel Schofield
- Anthony Michael Hall
- Carré Otis
- Hank Garrett
- Robert F. Lyons

== Production ==
While most of the movie takes place in Palm Springs, California, the majority of the film was not shot there. Location manager Jeff Ritchie did film some exterior shots there at La Plaza, because of the 1940s and 1950s architecture which gave the movie a "feeling of film noir".

== Reception ==
Robert Firsching from AllMovie rated it. He called the movie "atrocious and an unmitigated failure". Firsching was highly critical of Mickey Rourke, writing that "Rourke was apparently prepared for his performance by the wardrobe and makeup departments of the local mental hospital". He also points out that for an "erotic thriller", it is devoid of any sex scenes. He ends his review by stating "it is difficult to conceive of a semi-professional film failing so completely on so many levels". The Morning Call gave it a rating of. The Milwaukee Journal Sentinel wrote "the sex scenes rate as erotic only if you succeed in blocking Mick's half of the screen". Pat Jordan wrote in The New York Times Magazine that the movie "was so terrible that it went straight to video, despite the fact that the love interest in that movie was then his wife".
