= An Innocent Man (film) =

1989 film by Peter Yates

- Theatrical release poster
- Directed by: Peter Yates
- Written by: Larry Brothers
- Produced by: Ted Field; Robert W. Cort
- Starring: Tom Selleck; F. Murray Abraham
- Cinematography: William A. Fraker
- Edited by: Joseph Gutowski; Stephen A. Rotter; William S. Scharf
- Music by: Howard Shore
- Production companies: Touchstone Pictures; Silver Screen Partners IV; Interscope Communications
- Distributed by: Buena Vista Pictures Distribution
- Release date: October 6, 1989
- Running time: 113 minutes
- Country: United States
- Language: English
- Box office: Domestic: $20,047,604

An Innocent Man is a 1989 American crime drama thriller film directed by Peter Yates and starring Tom Selleck. The film follows James Rainwood, an airline mechanic sent to prison when framed by crooked police officers.

== Plot ==
James "Jimmie" Rainwood (Tom Selleck) is an ordinary, model citizen. Happily married to his beautiful wife Kate (Laila Robins), he has a modest home in Long Beach, California. Jimmie works as an expert American Airlines aeronautics engineer, supporting his wife while she's in college.

Detectives Mike Parnell (David Rasche) and Danny Scalise (Richard Young) are crooked narcotics cops who steal the drugs they seize at busts for their own recreational drug use and to sell to dealers, brutalising or framing anyone who gets in their way. One of their regular customers for stolen drugs is Joseph Donatelli (J.J. Johnston), a high-level mobster.

One day Parnell takes a large hit of cocaine and gets confused about the address for the next drug bust, and, as a result they break into the wrong house - Jimmie’s. Just as Jimmie walks out of the bathroom holding a hair dryer, Parnell shoots, thinking it's a weapon. Jimmie is shot in the stomach and knocked unconscious. Realising that they could both be tested for taking drugs and charged, they decide to cover up their mistake. They plant drugs in the house and place a firearm in the hand of Jimmie's unconscious body, framing him as a drug dealer. Jimmie is pegged as a user, having a prior record of marijuana possession while in college, and his only defense is his word against two decorated police officers. He claims the two cops framed him, but, with no evidence to prove the men are corrupt, he is convicted of several charges and receives a 6-year prison sentence. Internal Affairs detective John Fitzgerald (Badja Djola) takes an interest in the situation, though he can't do anything as the only evidence against the corrupt officers is hearsay.

Jimmie is completely unprepared for prison life. Early in his term he sees his cellmate murdered with a screwdriver and set on fire in the prison yard. Later he has a run-in with the Black Guerrilla Family run by Jingles, who grabs his commissary purchases, daring him to resist. The gang beats Jimmie senseless and he spends several weeks recuperating. Jimmie knows he can't expect help from anyone, least of all the prison authorities, who punish him for not naming his assailants. Shrewd and respected long-term inmate Virgil Cane (F. Murray Abraham) tells him he needs to "take care of his problem" with Jingles, but Jimmie resists the pressure to kill as long as he can. After Jingles forces him to witness the gang rape of another inmate, Jimmie knows he has no choice but to act.

Jimmie gets a plexiglas shank and stabs Jingles to death, with Virgil acting as lookout. The authorities know Jimmie did the killing, but since they can't prove it he spends three months in a windowless, subterranean solitary confinement cell. On being released he is treated as a minor hero for ridding the prison of Jingles. On the outside, Kate is causing trouble by pleading for a review of the case from anyone who might be able to help and is subsequently threatened by Parnell and Scalise. A visit with Fitzgerald goes nowhere, but when she angrily insults him, saying the two crooked cops are laughing at and insulting him, he's irritated and suspicious enough to confront Parnell and Scalise and demand that they leave her alone.

Before Jimmie is paroled after three years served, Virgil suggests to him that he should take advantage of his prison contacts to get even with the detectives who framed him. But Jimmie just wants to regain his life on the outside and joyfully reunites with Kate. Prison life has hardened him and he warns Kate that in some ways she no longer knows him. When Parnell and Scalise come to his home and threaten to frame him again if he doesn't do as they say, Jimmie realises their lives will never be their own while the detectives continue to hound them. Jimmie hates his wife being dragged into this violent world but she insists that she does know him as a good man who is only doing what he must. Kate visits Virgil in prison and asks for his help in getting evidence on the corrupt cops that the police can't ignore.

Virgil's outside contacts scam Parnell and Scalise into busting some "competition" that are, in reality, protected dealers of Donatelli. Fearing both Donatelli and Fitzgerald, the two cops only turn in a fraction of the seized drugs and decide to take the remaining huge haul out of state to start new lives, away from the threats of both the mob and the law. Before they can leave town, they are robbed by masked "thieves", Jimmie and Malcolm (M.C. Gainey), another friend of Virgil's that Jimmy met in prison. Malcolm calls the detectives and says he will swap the drugs for cash, with Fitzgerald having finally been convinced to wire Jimmie and Malcolm to record the sting. In the middle of the handoff Parnell attacks Malcolm and Jimmie is forced to hand over the drugs. Malcolm is shot and killed by Parnell. Fitzgerald then informs Parnell and Scalise that they have been busted and are about to be apprehended. However, neither of them goes down without a fight. Scalise attempts to run down Fitzgerald and Fitzgerald fires his weapon to defend himself. Scalise dies after crashing his car while trying to escape. Fitzgerald is injured in the confrontation and Jimmie chases Parnell, beating him bloody until Parnell pulls a knife. Jimmie wrestles the knife away from Parnell and has the blade at his throat until Kate, who has been acting as the driver, begs Jimmie not to kill him and let the law take over. Jimmie eventually walks away from Parnell, who is then placed under arrest by his soon-to-be former colleagues.

The film ends with Kate and Jimmie returning to a life they both deserve. Parnell, now a convict, is sent to the same prison where Jimmie was incarcerated. On his arrival as a new prisoner, Virgil calls attention to Parnell by yelling, "Hey, officer!" for all the other inmates to hear. Parnell, his face frozen in fear, looks up to the balcony where Virgil is smirking down at him. Jimmie is seen suited up and working again for the airline, finally getting his life back.

== Cast ==
- Tom Selleck as Jimmie "Rains" Rainwood
- F. Murray Abraham as Virgil Caine
- Laila Robins as Kate Rainwood
- David Rasche as Detective Mike Parnell
- Richard Young as Detective Danny Scalise
- Badja Djola as IA Detective John Fitzgerald
- Bruce A. Young as "Jingles"
- Dennis Burkley as "Butcher"
- Todd Graff as Robby
- M.C. Gainey as Malcolm
- Philip Baker Hall as Judge Kenneth Lavet
- J. Kenneth Campbell as Lieutenant Freebery
- Peter Van Norden as Peter Feldman
- James T. Morris as Junior
- Tobin Bell as Zeke
- Bob Maroff as Venucci
- Maggie Baird as Stacy
- J.J. Johnston as Joseph Donatelli
- Brian Brophy as Nate Blitman
- Ernie Lively as Donatelli's Dealer
- Dann Florek as Prosecuting Attorney (uncredited)

== Production ==
Peter Yates later recalled, he "wasn't sure at all" about the script when he first read it. "I was worried about the violence. But what struck me was the quality of the writing in the prison scenes and the accurate observation of prison life. This seemed to me to be something I hadn't seen on the screen in a lot of prison movies." He said he also loved "what I call 'experience films.' By that I mean films that are about somebody caught up in one of those situations where you're left feeling, 'there but for the grace of God go I'."

== Reception ==
On the review aggregator website Rotten Tomatoes, 44% of 9 critics' reviews are positive, with an average rating of 5/10. Metacritic, which uses a weighted average, assigned the film a score of 39 out of 100, based on 15 critics, indicating "generally unfavorable" reviews. Siskel & Ebert gave it two thumbs down.
