= Renée Jones =

American actress

- Occupation: Actress
- Years active: 1979–2012

Renée Jones is a former American dramatic actress. Jones is best known for playing Lexie Carver on NBC's long-running soap opera Days of Our Lives, a role she began in 1993.

== Life and career ==
Jones made her acting debut on the series The White Shadow. Jones made her debut on Days of Our Lives in the early 1980s as Nikki Wade. She returned to the soap, taking on a new role, as Lexie Carver in February 1993.

In April 2012, Jones confirmed in an interview with TV Guide's Michael Logan that she would vacate the role of Lexie Carver after 19 years and would retire to a simpler life, revealing that she was not happy in acting.

== Filmography ==
Year	Title	Role	Notes
1980	The Jeffersons	Stephanie	Episode: "A Night to Remember"
1981	Diff'rent Strokes	The Girl	Episode: "First Day Blues"
1982	WKRP in Cincinnati	Jackie Winston	Episode: "You Can't Go Out of Town Again"
1982	Days of Our Lives	Nikki Wade	Recurring role
1983	Deadly Lessons	Cally	Supporting role
1984	Knots Landing	Robin	4 episodes
1985	Trapper John, M.D.	Jackie Reardon	Episode: "A False Start"
1985	T. J. Hooker	Mary	Episode: "Return of a Cop"
1986	What's Happening Now!!	Saundra	Episode: "The Boss's Daughter"
1986	Friday the 13th Part VI: Jason Lives	Elizabeth "Sissy" Baker	Supporting role
1987	21 Jump Street	Darlene	Episode: "Besieged: Part 1"
1987	Marblehead Manor	Elizabeth Spivey	Episode: "I Led Three Wives"
1987	Isabel Sanford's Honeymoon Hotel	Jolie Scott	1 Episode
1987	The Magical World of Disney	Lilah	Episode: "The Liberators"
1988	Highway to Heaven	Gloria	Episode: "Country Doctor"
1988	Night Court	Lenore Grant	Episode: "The Last Temptation of Mac"
1989	L.A. Law	Diana Moses	Recurring role
1989	In the Heat of the Night	Topaz/Roberta Strutt	Episode: "Stranger in Town"
1991	The Terror Within II	Robin	Supporting role
1991	Talkin' Dirty After Dark	Kimmie	Supporting role
1991	21 Jump Street	Yvonne Andrews (Young)	Episode: "Crossfire"
1993	Star Trek: The Next Generation	Lt. Aquiel Uhnari	Episode: "Aquiel"
1993	Days of Our Lives	Lexie Carver	Series regular
1993	In the Heat of the Night	Candace Sloan	Episode: "Legacy"
1994	The Fresh Prince of Bel-Air	Miss Sharpe	Episode: "Father Knows Best"
1995	Murder, She Wrote	Reggie Evers	Episode: "Deadly Bidding"
