= Blood Tide =

- Theatrical poster
- Directed by: Richard Jefferies
- Screenplay by: Richard Jefferies; Nico Mastorakis
- Produced by: Donald Langdon; Nico Mastorakis; Brian Trenchard-Smith
- Starring: James Earl Jones; José Ferrer; Lila Kedrova; Mary Louise Weller; Martin Kove; Lydia Cornell; Deborah Shelton
- Cinematography: Aris Stavrou
- Edited by: Michael Bloecher; Alberto Valenzuela
- Music by: Shuki Levy; Jerry Mostly
- Production companies: Connaught International; Athon
- Distributed by: 21st Century Film Corporation (U.S.)
- Release date: 24 September 1982 (Bergen, New Jersey)
- Running time: 87 minutes
- Countries: United Kingdom; Greece
- Language: English

Blood Tide is a 1982 British horror film directed by Richard Jefferies, and starring James Earl Jones, José Ferrer, Lila Kedrova, Lydia Cornell, Mary Louise Weller (in her final film role), Martin Kove, and Deborah Shelton. Its plot follows a young American couple visiting a Greek island where the husband's sister disappeared; they soon find that an ancient monster has been released, forcing the villagers to return to the practice of human sacrifice to appease it.

The film is also known as Bloodtide (in the US) and Demon Island (American TV title). It has been misconstrued as a public domain film and pirated by many distributors who copied it from its original VHS release. However, as per The Copyright Office, copyright is registered under Omega Entertainment, Inc. and the writer/producer of the film, Nico Mastorakis.

== Plot ==
Neil and Sherry Grice, a young American couple, are visiting Greece in search of Neil's missing sister, Madeline, an artist who traveled to a remote island off the coast shortly before her disappearance. Upon arriving on the island, the couple are met by Nereus, the elderly mayor. While touring the island, Neil and Sherry see Madeline walking along a rocky hill, and follow her. They find her in the company of Frye, a middle-aged treasure hunter who is initially hostile toward Neil.

Later that night, Frye and Madeline's friend, Barbara, use Neil and Sherry's boat to visit a remote area of ocean off the island where Frye scuba dives into an underwater cavern. Inside, Frye gets drunk and uses a homemade bomb to unseal a walled-off tunnel which bears a sigil engraved above it. While Neil and Sherry visit the beach the next day with Madeline, Frye, and Barbara, Sherry observes Madeline acting strangely, in a seemingly trance-like state. When Sherry gifts Madeline an expensive perfume, Madeline pours the entire bottle over her body.

Madeline visits a convent on the island where she speaks with Sister Elena, and confides in a number of bizarre paintings she has uncovered after stripping the paint from the walls of the monastery. Among them are a portrait of a saint and a serpentine creature, which predates Christianity. Later, Barbara is attacked while swimming on the beach and killed in what appears to have been a shark attack. Her dismembered corpse is found by local children after it washes up on the shore. Meanwhile, several other young women in the town go missing.

While out boating, Neil and Sherry come across Frye's boat, and assume he is diving. Neil decides to follow him, and enters the underwater cave. Once inside, Frye tells Neil that it was Madeline's idea to come to the island in the first place, and that he had met her on the mainland prior—she was drawn to the island, and insistent they go there. He recounts how, after they arrived there, Madeline's personality began to change. Neil and Sherry visit the convent in an attempt to locate Madeline, but a nun forces them to leave. Meanwhile, Lethe, a young village girl, falls off a cliffside into the water while playing with the village boys. Her mother attempts to save her, as does Frye, who witnesses the accident from his boat. Frye saves Lethe, but her mother is eaten alive by the serpent.

That night, Frye, Neil, and Sherry attend a festival held by the villagers. Meanwhile, Madeline, back at the convent, witnesses the nuns holding a ceremonial prayer. A short time later, a bloodied and shocked Sister Anna, the mother superior, stumbles into the festival. Neil, Sherry, and Frye rush to the convent and find it in disarray, the nuns all dead. Madeline, meanwhile, in a trance state, jumps from a cliff into the ocean, and swims to the underwater cavern. Frye and Neil follow after her. As Neil helps pull Madeline from the cave, Frye detonates it, blowing up the serpent and sacrificing his own life. Madeline, Neil, and Sherry depart the island at dawn.

== Cast ==
- James Earl Jones as Frye
- José Ferrer as Nereus
- Lila Kedrova as Sister Anna
- Mary Louise Weller as Sherry Grice
- Martin Kove as Neil Grice
- Lydia Cornell as Barbara
- Deborah Shelton as Madeline Grice
- Sofia Seirli as Sister Elena
- Despina Tomazani as Lethe's Mother
- Rania Photiou as Lethe
- Spyros Papafrantzis as Dionysis
- Irini Tripkou as Virgin
- Annabel Schofield as Vikki

== Reception ==
Charles Tatum from eFilmCritic.com awarded the film 3 out of 4 stars, noting that, although the film wasn't perfect, it had its moments. In particular, Tatum commended the film's suspense scenes, and monster design.

Author and film critic Leonard Maltin awarded the film 1.5 out of 4 stars, stating that the film's Greek scenery was the film's only distinction, calling it "[a] substandard programmer".

TV Guide offered similar criticism, awarding it 1/5 stars, calling it "An embarrassing picture for all concerned, but fun for devotees of "bad enough to be good" movies."
