= Richard Young (actor) =

American actor

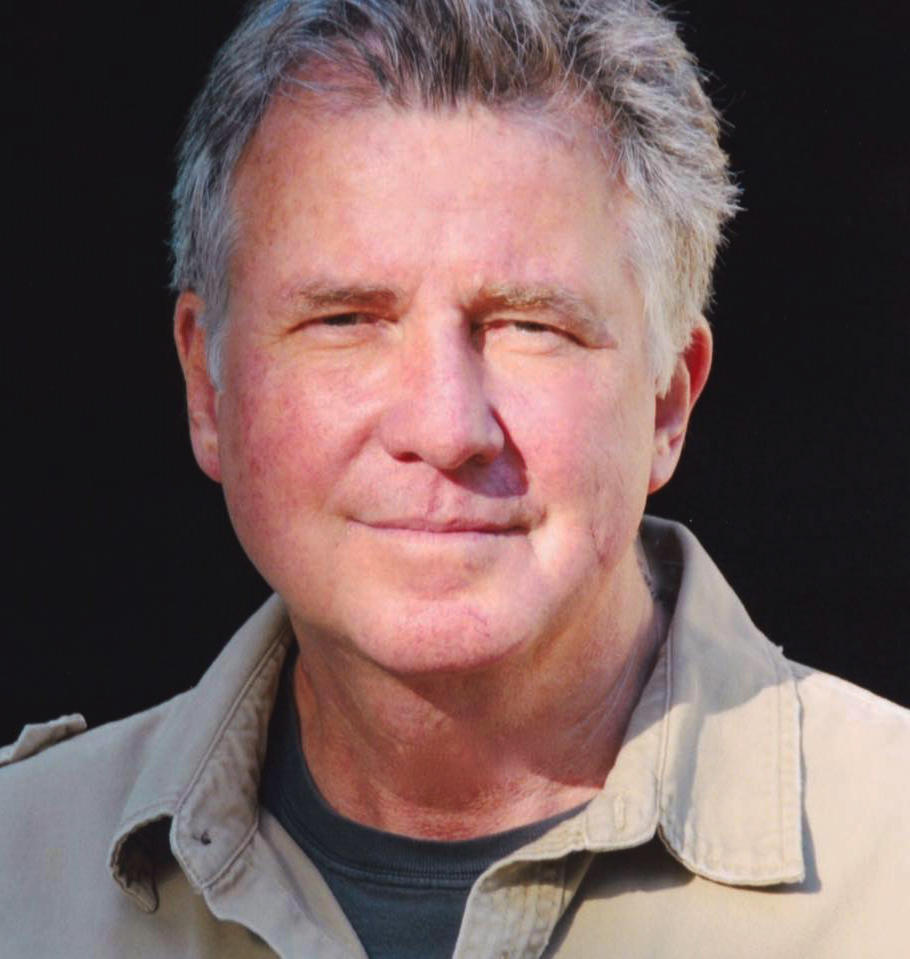
- Born: December 17, 1955 (age 69); Kissimmee, Florida, U.S.
- Occupation: Actor
- Years active: 1971–1996

Richard Young (born December 17, 1955) is an American character actor, independent filmmaker, screenwriter, photographer and artist. Active from the early 1970s, he gained prominence starring in the opening sequence of Indiana Jones and the Last Crusade (1989). Other feature films appearances include: The Ice Pirates (1984), Friday the 13th: A New Beginning (1985) and An Innocent Man (1989).

== Early life ==
Born in Kissimmee, Florida in 1955, Young grew up in a conservative environment on military bases. At twelve years old, his father bought him a Leica camera and taught him lighting basics which helped him become the main photographer for his high school's newspaper. At age 18, he worked as a longshoreman in Alaska before attending the University of Washington on a pre-dentistry program for two years. While at University he worked as a free-lance photographer for extra money until he quit pre-dentistry to head for California to try to make it as a cameraman.

== Career ==
In the early 1970s, Young found work with New World Pictures as crew for Roger Corman, however, the failure of an actor to appear resulted in Young starring in Night Call Nurses. While acting, he received offers to guest star on prime-time television and joined Beverly Hills Playhouse theatre group. Young found a variety of work from both film and television including appearing in Kung Fu with William Katt and Gary Busey, Flamingo Road with Morgan Fairchild, Knight Rider and the Cheers episode 'Love Thy Neighbor'. In 1979, Young and John Chesko, along with Brenda Venus, filmed American novelist Henry Miller, resulting in the film Dinner with Henry Miller. A short thirty minute cut was released by Brenda Venus in 1984, however, over 2 hours of footage exist that is owned and being produced by Young who has yet to formally release the finished film, one of Miller's final film appearances.

By the mid to late 1980s, Young had established himself as both a leading actor in television and film, appearing in Final Mission (1984). It was when Young met Steven Spielberg on the set of Amazing Stories whilst filming "Alamo Jobe" that the seed of Young playing the inspiration for Indiana Jones was formed in Spielberg's mind. In 1989, he was cast as 'Garth' or 'Fedora' in Indiana Jones and the Last Crusade. However, despite appearing in lead roles he became disillusioned with the industry in 1995 and left to pursue his photography career.

== Bosnian War ==
In the mid 1990s, Young was hired as cameraman for a documentary about a young woman who had come from the Bosnian War to make a new life in the US. During the filming, the crew found out that the family had gone missing in Croatia - so Young, the crew and the young woman went to the war zone to find the surviving members of her family.

== Personal life ==
As of 2018, Young resides in the Pacific Northwest in Seattle, Washington and is the owner of Silverwing Images where he creates fine art photography.

== Filmography ==
- 1971 Room 222 (TV) as Augie Cerutti
- 1971 The F.B.I. (TV) as Mason Carter
- 1971 The Reluctant Heroes (TV) as Private Golden
- 1972 Ironside (TV) as Steve Winters
- 1972 Night Call Nurses as Kyle Toby
- 1972 Marcus Welby, M.D. as Horst
- 1973 Fly Me as Doctor
- 1973 Kung Fu (TV) as Verne
- 1974 Nakia (TV)
- 1974 Inferno in Paradise as Clay Martin
- 1975 Let's Do It Again as Biggie's Crony #3
- 1976 Cry Your Purple Heart Out as Frank
- 1976 Ellery Queen (TV) as Dr. Kemp
- 1976 Barnaby Jones (TV) as Craig Webster
- 1976 Banjo Hackett: Roamin' Free (TV) as Luke Mintore
- 1977 Cherry Hill High as Vintner
- 1977 Laverne & Shirley (TV) as Charles Warner
- 1977 Switch (TV) as Larry Castle
- 1979 Ryan's Hope (TV) as Lieutenant Hayes
- 1979 Swim Team as Johnny
- 1979 Cocaine Cowboys as Terry
- 1981 High Risk as Mike, The Pilot
- 1981 Splendor in the Grass as Brian Stacey
- 1981 Flamingo Road as Steve
- 1982 Seven Brides for Seven Brothers (TV) as Deerwell
- 1982 Texas (TV) as Mr. Hannibal
- 1983 Knight Rider (TV) as Sonny Prince
- 1983 The Mississippi (TV) as Earl Mack
- 1984 Nickel Mountain as Jeff Freund
- 1984 Emerald Point N.A.S. as Roger Pauley
- 1984 The Ice Pirates as Debs
- 1984 Final Mission as Sergeant Deacon
- 1984 Hunter (TV) as Jesse
- 1985 Friday the 13th: A New Beginning as Dr. Matthew Letter
- 1985 Amazing Stories (TV) as Davy Crockett
- 1985 Cheers (TV) as Frank
- 1986 Walt Disney's Wonderful World of Color as Frank Manley
- 1986 Assassin as Robert Golem
- 1987 Blue Heart
- 1988 Saigon Commandos as Sergeant Mark Stryker
- 1988 1969 as Ralph's Cellmate
- 1988 Pancho Barnes (TV)
- 1988 Beauty and the Beast (TV) as Buddy
- 1989 Indiana Jones and the Last Crusade as Man With Fedora
- 1989 Lords of the Deep as Chadwick
- 1989 An Innocent Man as Detective Danny Scalise
- 1990 Fatal Skies (TV) as Deputy Derwood
- 1991 Eye of the Widow as Malko Linge
- 1994 Murder, She Wrote (TV) as Nick Halsey
- 1996 Special Report: Journey to Mars (TV) as Astronaut Charles Downing
- 2000 Cleo Bachelor of the Year (TV) as Himself, Contestant
