= Rich Orloff =

American dramatist

Rich Orloff is a playwright living in New York City.

He has taught playwriting at his alma mater Oberlin College, at Miami's City Theater, and for the Connecticut Young Playwrights program. He has also given lectures and workshops at Central Washington University, Western Michigan University and State Fair College in Missouri.

Prior to the beginning of his career as a playwright, Orloff appeared on the game shows Match Game 77 and Body Language. On the latter he won over $12,000. In his twenties, he worked as a television writer on series including Three's Company and Flo.

== Work ==
Among his full-length plays are:

- Advanced Chemistry, winner 2002 Pickering Award for Playwriting Achievement
- Big Boys, winner 1997 InterPlay International Play Festival and second place, 2002 Kaufman and Hart Prize for New American Comedy
- Damaged Goods, winner 1994 Playwrights First Award
- Domestic Tranquility, winner 1999 Theatre Conspiracy New Play Contest
- Skin Deep, winner 2008 Larry Corse Playwriting Prize
- Someone's Knocking, critic's pick, Backstage West, 1998
- Shedding Light, winner 2000 Abeles Foundation Playwrights Award
- Veronica's Position, winner 1995 Festival of Emerging American Theatre
- Vietnam 101: The War on Campus, based on true stories of 1960s college students.
- Chatting with the Tea Party, (2016)

Rich is the author of over eighty short plays, mostly comedies, including those in the comic revues Romantic Fools, Funny as a Crutch, Nothing Serious, Oy!, Ha!, and The Whole Shebang. His play, Couples, an evening of eight short two-character comedies and dramas was presented at the Workshop's Jewel Box Theater in New York City from May 9–19, 2007. Playscripts, Inc. has published eight volumes of his short plays. (www.playscripts.com) Each of the plays has excerpts on the site, as well as at www.richorloff.com.

Orloff's one-acts have had over 2000 productions on six of the seven continents, plus a staged reading in Antarctica. Seven of his one-acts have been published in the annual Best American Short Plays series, and five have been included in annual Best Ten-Minute Plays anthology. They've also been included in the bilingual collection "An Anthology of Contemporary American Plays" (published in China), in "The Bedford Guide to Literature", and in anthologies published by Random House and Western Michigan University Press.
