= Isabel Sanford's Honeymoon Hotel =

- Also known as: Isabel's Honeymoon Hotel
- Genre: Sitcom
- Created by: Gordon Farr; Casey Keller; Richard Albrecht
- Directed by: Dennis Steinmetz; Bob Claver
- Starring: Isabel Sanford; John Lawlor; Renee Jones; Rhonda Bates; Earl Boen; Lana Schwab; Ernie Banks; Miguel Nunez
- Composers: David White; Evan Pace; Steven Diamond
- Country of origin: United States
- Original language: English
- No. of seasons: 1
- No. of episodes: 5

Production
- Executive producers: Gordon Farr; Fred Silverman
- Producer: David Yarnell
- Camera setup: Multi-camera
- Running time: 22–24 minutes
- Production companies: De Laurentiis Entertainment Group; Silverman/Farr Productions

Original release
- Network: Syndication
- Release: January 5 – January 9, 1987

Isabel Sanford's Honeymoon Hotel is an American sitcom that was broadcast in first-run syndication in January 1987. The stripped series, airing five days a week, was created to showcase Isabel Sanford's comedic skills, but it failed to attract an audience and was quickly cancelled. The title of the series may have likely been inspired by an episode from the tenth season of The Jeffersons called "Honeymoon Hotel".

== Premise ==
Isabel Scott is a divorcee who runs Isabel's Honeymoon Hotel, a once profitable but now debt-ridden inn. Accompanying Isabel are her ex-husband K.C., her niece Jolie, her assistants Martha and Carlton, Mel the bartender, and Agnes the chambermaid.

== Cast ==
- Isabel Sanford as Isabel Scott
- Ernie Banks as K.C.
- Renee Jones as Jolie
- Rhonda Bates as Martha
- John Lawlor as Carlton
- Earl Boen as Mel
- Lana Schwab as Agnes
- Miguel Nunez as Rooster

Casey Kasem was the program's announcer. Guest stars included Lydia Cornell, Kelly Monteith, David Lander, and Marcia Wallace.

== Series development ==
It was produced by De Laurentiis Entertainment Group in association with Fred Silverman. The plan was to have 100 new episodes made by the fall of 1987.

It debuted as a "pilot week" on several stations in January 1987. However, DEG went bankrupt before production was to fully start, thereby cancelling the show.
