= Lydia Cornell =

American actress

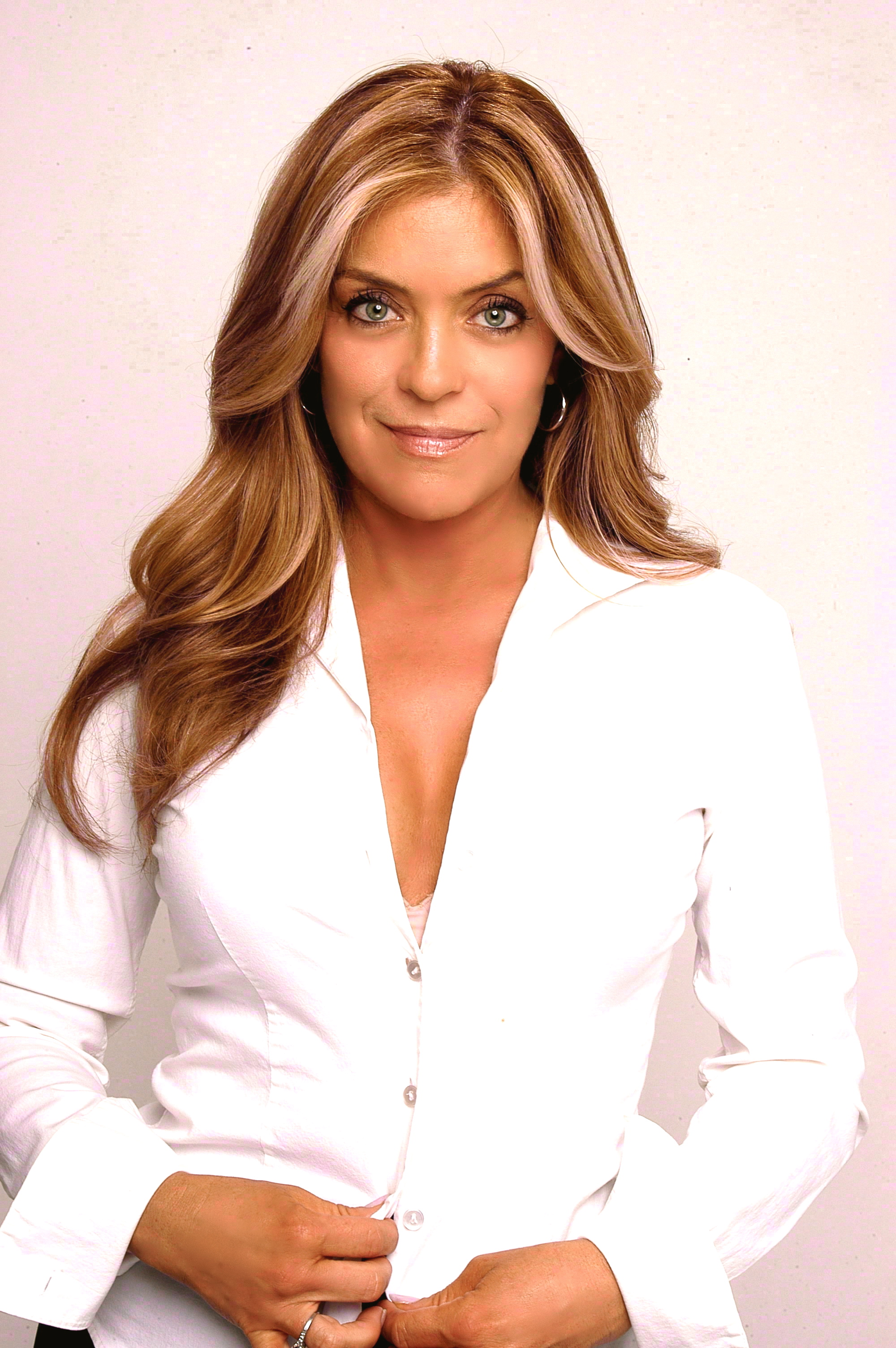
- Lydia Cornell Hayeland (2007)
- Born: Lydia Korniloff; July 23, 1953 (age 73); El Paso, Texas, U.S.
- Education: Scarsdale High School; Los Angeles Conservatory of Music and Arts; University of Colorado Boulder (BSc)
- Occupation: Actress
- Years active: 1979–present
- Known for: Too Close for Comfort
- Spouse: Paul Hayeland (m. 2002; div. 2010)
- Children: 2
- Website: www.lydiacornell.com

Lydia Cornell (born Lydia Korniloff; July 23, 1953) is an American actress, best known for her role as Sara Rush on the ABC situation comedy Too Close for Comfort.

== Early life and family ==
Cornell was born Lydia Korniloff in El Paso, Texas on July 23, 1953. She is the eldest daughter of concert violinist Irma Jean Stowe, the great-granddaughter of Harriet Beecher Stowe, and Gregory Jacob Korniloff, a graduate of the Los Angeles Conservatory of Music and Arts, who was later assistant concertmaster of the El Paso Symphony Orchestra. Cornell is the elder sister of the late Paul Korniloff, a piano prodigy, and Kathryn Korniloff, co-founder of the band Two Nice Girls and a sound designer and composer since 1995.

While a nine-year-old fourth grade student at Mesita Elementary School, Cornell was chosen as El Paso's "Little Miss Cotton" in March 1963.

In 1966, Cornell and her family moved to Scarsdale, New York. She attended both Scarsdale Junior High School and Scarsdale High School, from which she graduated in 1971.

Cornell then enrolled at the University of Colorado Boulder (CU), where she studied business, drama, English, Russian, Spanish and Anthropology. During the summer between her sophomore and junior years, she worked as a photographer and server at the Caribou Ranch recording studio in Nederland, Colorado, where she met stars including Billy Joel, The Beach Boys, America, Chicago, Carole King, Joni Mitchell, David Cassidy, and Henry Diltz. The Ozark Mountain Daredevils credited her on their album Men from Earth and, prior to graduating CU, she worked as the road manager for musician Michael Murphey. She graduated from CU in May 1976 with a Bachelor of Science in Business, with majors in both advertising and English/drama.

By the time of her father's death in May 1977, Cornell had joined the rest of the Korniloff family, who had been living in The Hague, the Netherlands since mid-1975. Soon after, her mother and siblings moved back to El Paso, Texas. By 1978 Cornell had moved to Los Angeles to pursue an acting career. While there she had a job for three months working at a recording studio and modeling for album covers, before being employed by Jack Webb Productions as a secretary-production assistant. Still known as Lydia Korniloff, Cornell also worked as an assistant to the producer on the television movie Little Mo, a biography of tennis star Maureen Connolly.

== Acting career ==
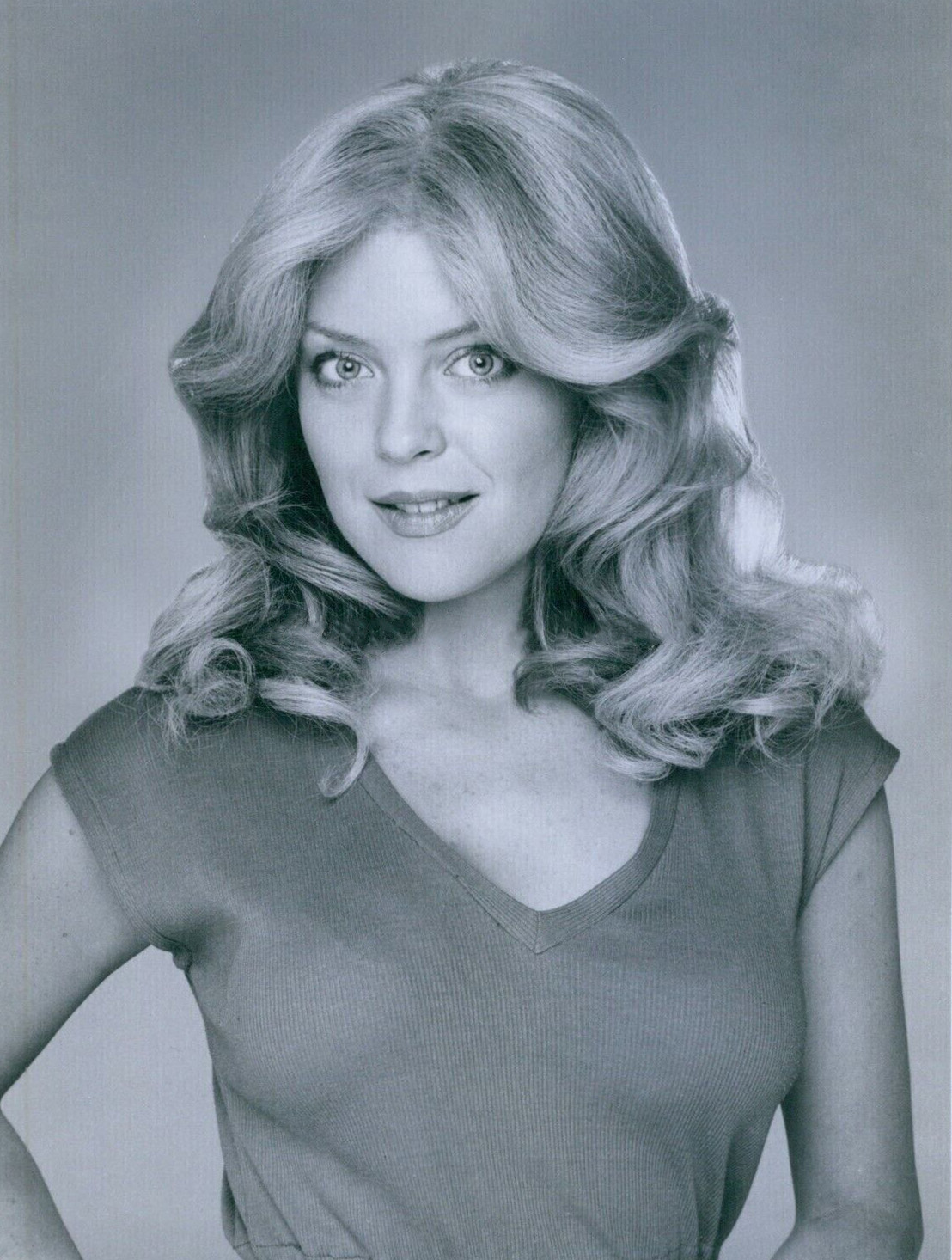
Cornell in Too Close For Comfort, 1980

Cornell's first screen appearance was as Lydia Korniloff in a walk-on as a girl in a car in the film Steel (1979), produced by and starring Lee Majors. Her first professional speaking part was in an episode of The Love Boat, for which she had two lines. In the summer of 1980, Cornell spent nine weeks filming in the Greek Isles for her appearance in the mythological horror film Blood Tide, which was not released until 1982.

Cornell's first major role was as Sara Rush, the daughter to Ted Knight's character Henry Rush, on the sitcom Too Close for Comfort during 1980–1985. In 1982, at the height of the sitcom's popularity, Cornell was described by sexologist Robert T. Francoeur as providing a modern example of "classic female stereotypes in the mold of Marilyn Monroe and Jayne Mansfield".

Cornell appeared in several single episode roles on television series such as The Love Boat, Charlie's Angels, The Drew Carey Show, Quantum Leap (the pilot episode) Full House, Knight Rider, The Dukes of Hazzard, The A-Team, T. J. Hooker, Simon & Simon, Hunter, Hardball, Black Scorpion, Hotel, Fantasy Island and Curb Your Enthusiasm. She also appeared as a guest on episodes of television game shows including Battle of the Network Stars, Super Password, and Match Game Hollywood Squares Hour.

== Comedy career ==
Cornell works as a stand-up comedian writing her own material. She writes political barbs on her personal blog.

== Filmography ==
=== Film ===
Year	Title	Role	Notes
1979	Steel	Girl in the car	(as Lydia Kornilov)
1982	Bloodtide	Barbara	
1999	Miss Supreme Queen	Mrs. Sugarman	Short
2001	Happy Holidaze from the Jonzes	Woman	Short
2003	Venus Conspiracy	Lexy	Short
2004	William Hung: Hangin' with Hung	Manager	Video
2008	Damage Done	Andrea's Mother	Drama
2015	Cats Dancing on Jupiter	Myra	
2022	The Eyes	Misty the Talk Radio Guest	Short
TBA	Something About Mother	Receptionist	Short
TBA	The Awesome Adventures of Frankie Stargazer		

=== Television ===
Year	Title	Role	Notes
1982	Dick Clark's New Year's Rockin' Eve	Herself	Co-hosted with Anson Williams
1984	The Dukes of Hazzard	Mary Beth	Episodes: Undercover Dukes Part One, Undercover Dukes Part Two
1984	Knight Rider	Sabrina	Episode: Speed Demons
1980-1985	Too Close for Comfort	Sara Rush	Season 1-5
1980-1986	The Love Boat		5 episodes
1986	The A-Team	Jody Joy	Episode: Wheel of Fortune
1986	Simon & Simon	Lisa Jenkins	Episode: Family Forecast
1984-1986	Hotel	Doris O'Neil; Clare Winslow	Episode: Trials; Episode: Facades
1986	T.J. Hooker	Christine Shankman	Episode: "Death Trip" (S5, E15)
1987	Isabel Sanford's Honeymoon Hotel		1 episode
1987	Hunter	Nicki Rains / Rena Farrell	Episode: Straight to the Heart
1989	Full House	Linda Mosley	Episode: El Problema Grande de D.J.
1989	Quantum Leap	Sally	Episode: Genesis: Part 1 - September 13, 1956 (
1989	Monsters	Portia	Episode: A Bond of Silk
1989	Hâgar the Horrible	Honi (voice)	TV short
1990	Hardball (1989 TV series)		Episode: "Every Dog Has His Day" (S1, E17)
2001	Black Scorpion (TV series)	Patricia Carlyle	Episode: "No Sweat" (S1, E9)
2005	Curb Your Enthusiasm	Bra Saleswoman	Episode: "The Christ Nail" (S5, E3)
2018	It's A Beach Thing (TV series)	Mrs. Spangler	Episode: Series pilot
2020	Viral Vignettes (TV series)	Valerie	Episode: "Care Package" (S1, E4)
