= Hollywood Boulevard (1976 film) =

1976 film by Allan Arkush and Joe Dante

- Theatrical release poster by John Solie
- Directed by: Allan Arkush; Joe Dante
- Written by: Danny Opatoshu (Note: Opatoshu is credited under the pseudonym "Pat Hobby".)
- Produced by: Jon Davison
- Starring: Candice Rialson; Mary Woronov; Rita George; Jeffrey Kramer; Dick Miller; Paul Bartel; Jonathan Kaplan
- Cinematography: Jamie Anderson
- Edited by: Allan Arkush; Joe Dante; Amy Jones
- Music by: Andrew Stein
- Production company: New World Pictures
- Distributed by: New World Pictures
- Release date: February 20, 1976
- Running time: 83 minutes
- Country: United States
- Language: English
- Budget: $54,039
- Box office: $1 million (North American rentals)

Hollywood Boulevard is a 1976 American satirical exploitation film directed by Allan Arkush and Joe Dante (in their respective directorial debuts), and starring Candice Rialson, Paul Bartel, and Mary Woronov. It follows an aspiring actress who has just arrived in Los Angeles, only to be hired by a reckless B movie film studio where she bears witness to a series of gruesome and fatal on-set accidents. The film blends elements of the comedy, thriller, and slasher film genres.

The film was made as a result of a bet between producers Jon Davison and Roger Corman to make the cheapest ever film for New World Pictures. This was accomplished by extensive use of footage from other New World films, and it features a number of references and inside-jokes to the studio's previous features. Principal photography took place in October 1975 over a ten-day period on a budget of $54,000.

== Plot ==
Pompous film director Eric Von Leppe is shooting a skydiving sequence for low-budget Miracle Pictures in which an actress is killed. Candy Wednesday arrives in Los Angeles from Indiana to make it as an actor. She swiftly gets an agent, Walter Paisley, but struggles to find work until she inadvertently gets involved in a bank robbery as a getaway driver. This leads her to getting hired by Miracle Pictures as a stunt driver. She meets Eric Von Leppe, temperamental starlet Mary McQueen, sleazy producer P.G., and friendly scriptwriter, Pat. Candy and Pat fall in love and she starts to get work as an actress, becoming friends with fellow starlets Bobbi and Jill.

The group travel to the Philippines to make a violent war film, Machete Maidens of Mora Tau, starring Candy, Mary, Bobbi and Jill. Candy has to play a character who is raped, which upsets her. Later on during the shoot, Jill, Bobbi and P.G. have a threesome. During the filming of a battle sequence, Jill is shot dead by an unseen attacker. Von Leppe and Mary choose not to call the authorities, instead leaving Jill's corpse behind in the rural shooting location. Candy is traumatized by the incident.

Back in the United States, Candy, Walter and Pat all go to see Machete Maidens at a local drive-in. Candy is extremely self-conscious watching her performance, and gets drunk during the screening. She leaves the car and visits the projectionist's booth, where she tries to force him to stop the film. The projectionist tries to rape Candy, but she is rescued by Walter.

Candy, Mary, and Bobbi are next cast in a 1950s-set science fiction Western film. While shooting a car chase scene in the desert, Mary, Candy and Bobbi are almost killed in an accident after the brakes in Candy's car mysteriously malfunction. Bobbi is enraged by the incident, and tells Patrick she wants to quit working for Miracle Pictures. Late that night, Bobbi is called back to the Western town set to perform retakes. Upon arrival, she is met by an unknown individual cloaked in a black shawl. The assailant slashes Bobbi with a hunting knife before chasing her through the set and eventually stabbing her to death.

Bobbi's murder makes front-page news, and the city goes on high alert for the unknown "slasher killer". Fearing for her life, Candy announces she is leaving Los Angeles. Meanwhile, Von Leppe, P.G., Patrick, and Walter screen rushes of the film, during which they observe snuff footage of Bobbi's murder that is present on the reel. Candy drives to the Hollywood Sign, where she tearfully overlooks the city. Mary arrives, revealing herself to be the killer, and attempts to murder Candy with an axe. Pat arrives to stop Mary as she and Candy tussle. Mary is killed, however, when the Hollywood Sign topples over on her, crushing her to death.

Candy goes on to become a renowned film star, and attends the premiere for a biographical film based on her experiences while working with Miracle Pictures.

== Cast ==
- Candice Rialson as Candy Wednesday
- Mary Woronov as Mary McQueen
- Rita George as Bobbi Quackenbush
- Jeffrey Kramer as Patrick Hobby
- Dick Miller as Walter Paisley
- Richard Doran as P.G.
- Tara Strohmeier as Jill McBain
- Paul Bartel as Eric Von Leppe
- John Kramer as Duke Mantee
- Jonathan Kaplan as Scotty
- Charles B. Griffith as Mark Dentine
- Commander Cody and His Lost Planet Airmen as themselves

== Production ==
=== Development ===
The film came out of a bet made between producer Jon Davison and Roger Corman that Davison could make a film cheaper than any other that had been made at New World Pictures. Corman granted him a budget of $60,000 and only allowed ten days of shooting instead of the usual 15. The filmmakers achieved this by coming up with a story about a B-movie studio which could incorporate footage from other movies that Corman owned.

=== Casting ===
According to the audio commentary on the film's DVD by Joe Dante, Jon Davison and Allan Arkush, Roger Corman originally wanted Roberta Collins to play the lead, but they fought for Candice Rialson. Diabolique magazine argued that "I'm a Collins fan, but it was the right decision because Rialson brings not just looks and comic timing, but also a plucky underdog persona that is immensely appealing."

Paul Bartel credits the film with launching his acting career. He later said they were worried the film would not be long enough so they improvised a series of "TV interviews" in which each of the major characters sketches in something of his background. Bartel tried to mimic "the kind of spiel Roger [Corman] used to feed the press, speaking of the exploitation films which he often loaded with doses of ersatz social consciousness: "In this film we've taken the myth of Romeo and Juliet, combined it with high speed car action and a sincere plea for nuclear controls in our lifetime."

Mary Woronov was cast in the film based on her performance in Death Race 2000 (1975), another film produced by New World Pictures.

Dante, Davison and Arkush also state the part of producer PG was turned down by Barry Gordon and Dwayne Hickman, and that Rita George was dating Dean Martin during filming.

=== Filming ===
The film was shot over a period of ten days in October 1975 on short ends of raw stock left over from other movies. The script was a send up of the "three girls" movies New World were making at the time such as Summer School Teachers, with the murder plot borrowing heavily from an old Bela Lugosi movie, The Death Kiss (1932).

The movie was also known as The Starlets, Hollywood Starlets, The Actresses and Hello, Hollywood. Dante says at one stage Corman wanted to call it Hollywood Hookers but the directors did not like that "even though it probably would have made more money if it was called Hollywood Hookers".

== Intertextuality ==
=== Featured works ===
The film features footage from the following Corman pictures:

- Battle Beyond the Sun (1962) – film seen at drive in
- The Terror (1963) – film seen at drive in
- The Big Bird Cage (1972) – battle sequence
- Night of the Cobra Woman (1972) – shot of a cobra
- The Hot Box (1972) – battle sequence
- Night Call Nurses (1972) – the opening sky diving sequence
- Unholy Rollers (1972) – a rollerderby sequence
- Savage! (1973) – battle sequence
- Caged Heat (1974) – shot of a police car drifting
- Big Bad Mama (1974) – a movie stunt performed by Candy
- Crazy Mama (1975) – the bank robbery sequence involving the red car at the beginning
- Death Race 2000 (1975) – car chase film sequence

=== Inside jokes ===
The movie features a number of in-jokes:

- Paul Bartel plays Eric Von Leppe, the name of the Boris Karloff character in The Terror (1963).
- Dick Miller plays Walter Paisley, the name of the character Miller played in A Bucket of Blood (1959).
- John Kramer plays Duke Mantee, the name of the Humphrey Bogart character in The Petrified Forest (1936).
- Jeffrey Kramer plays Patrick Hobby, the name of the hero of a series of stories by F Scott Fitzgerald (this name was also used as a pseudonym for writer Danny Opatoshu because it was a non-union movie).
- Tara Strohmeier plays Jill McBain, the name of the Claudia Cardinale character in Once Upon a Time in the West (1969).
- Dick Miller watches himself in a scene from The Terror (1963).
- Machete Maidens of Mora Tau is a homage to the film Zombies of Mora Tau (1957).
- Cameos from directors Charles B. Griffith, Jonathan Kaplan, Joe Dante, Danny Opatoshu and Lewis Teague; along with Forrest J. Ackerman, editor of Famous Monsters of Filmland; film writers Todd McCarthy and Joseph McBride; and Robby the Robot from Forbidden Planet (1956).

== Release ==
The film opened in Orlando, Florida on February 20, 1976 before having its Los Angeles premiere on April 28, 1976.

=== Box office ===
In the United States and Canada, the film grossed approximately $1 million in rentals.

=== Critical response ===
The Los Angeles Times critic Kevin Thomas called the film "a hilarious, often outrageous spoof of the zany world of low budget exploitation filmmaking." "Definitely not for people who are looking for anything elegant or high tone", said Kenneth Turan of The Washington Post.

Scott Hammen of the Courier Journal praised the film as "the funniest movie in town" upon its release in Louisville, Kentucky, adding: "Unlike most of the things on our screens nowadays which are bad without intending to be, Hollywood Boulevard is purposefully and conscientiously rotten... One may need a basic affection for low-brow Americana to really enjoy [it]. But just as there are those who indulge in a secret taste for junk food occasionally, there are a lot of us with a similar passion for junk movies and, for us, Hollywood Boulevard is a constant delight."

Nathan Rabin, reviewing the film in 2002 for The A.V. Club, wrote: "The directors' ability to inject innocence into a film crawling with gratuitous sex, nudity, violence, and sexual abuse says much about the Corman contingent's unique ability to be creepy and strangely endearing at the same time. For those willing to overlook periodic missteps into the nether regions of bad taste, Hollywood Boulevard is the sort of scrappy, resourceful, smart B-movie that threatens to give shameless opportunism a good name."

Filmink declared "the film is packed with so much talent, energy and sheer love for cinema that its faults can be forgiven. Hollywood Boulevard is a valentine to movie making, jampacked full of references to not just New World and Corman but Bava, Bela Lugosi, Alfred Zugmsith, Robbie the Robot, F Scott Fitzgerald, Sergio Leone, The Petrified Forest, and many others. It has a definite Mad magazine vibe."

On the review aggregator website Rotten Tomatoes, 60% of 15 critics' reviews are positive.

=== Home media ===
Concorde Video released the film on DVD in 2001. Scorpion Releasing released a limited edition Blu-ray on August 4, 2016, featuring a new color-corrected restoration from the original film elements, along with new interviews from cast and crew members and other bonus materials.

== Bibliography ==
- Jones, Stephen Graham (2011). Demon Theory: A Novel. Toronto, Ontario: Doubleday. ISBN 978-0-385-67271-9.
- Koetting, Christopher T. (2009). Mind Warp!: The Fantastic True Story of Roger Corman's New World Pictures. Bristol, England: Hemlock Books. ISBN 978-0-9557774-1-7.
- LoBrutto, Vincent (2021). The Seventies: The Decade That Changed American Film Forever. Lanham, Maryland: Rowman & Littlefield. ISBN 978-1-538-13719-2.
- Nashawaty, Chris (2013). Crab Monsters, Teenage Cavemen and Candy Stripe Nurses: Roger Corman: King of the B Movie. New York City, New York: Abrams. ISBN 978-1-61312-981-4.
- Rausch, Adam J. (2015). Fifty Filmmakers: Conversations with Directors from Roger Avary to Steven Zaillian. Jefferson, North Carolina: McFarland. ISBN 978-0-786-48409-6.
