= List of awards and nominations received by The Practice =

List of awards won by The Practice
- The Practice Title Screen
Awards and nominations
Award	Won	Nominated
ASCAP Film & TV Music Awards	3	3
ASC Awards	0	1
Artios Awards	0	1
BMI Film & TV Awards	4	4
Edgar Allan Poe Awards	1	3
GLAAD Media Awards	0	1
Genesis Awards	2	2
Golden Globe Awards	3	7
Golden Reel Awards	2	2
Humanitas Prize	0	2
NAACP Image Awards	1	11
Producers Guild Awards	1	2
Peabody Awards	1	1
Primetime Emmy Awards	15	41
Prism Awards	1	1
Satellite Awards	1	6
Screen Actors Guild Awards	0	3
TV Guide Awards	0	1
TCA Awards	0	5
Viewers For Quality Television Q Awards	6	16
WGA Awards	0	1
Young Artist Awards	0	4
- Total number of wins and nominations
Totals	41	118
- Footnotes

The following is a list of awards and nominations received by The Practice, an American television series which ran from March 4, 1997, until May 16, 2004, and was broadcast on ABC. It was nominated for a large number of awards including 41 Primetime Emmy Awards (fifteen wins), 16 Viewers For Quality Television Q Awards (six wins), 11 NAACP Image Awards (one win), 7 Golden Globe Awards (three wins), 6 Satellite Awards (one win), 3 Screen Actors Guild Awards, a WGA Award and the series won a Peabody Award.

The series holds the Primetime Emmy Award record for most wins in the Guest Actor and Guest Actress categories for a single series, as well as most nominations in those categories, a total of nine outstanding guest actor and actress Emmys along with 7 nominations went to the show.

Camryn Manheim was the first regular actress to win an Emmy, and Michael Badalucco the first regular actor. Camryn Manheim is also the only actor to win both an Emmy and a Golden Globe for her performance. Steve Harris and Dylan McDermott both got a total of nine individual nominations, which made them the most nominated actors from The Practice

When the series ended, in 2004, it was nominated for over a hundred awards and won 41.

== Emmy Awards ==
The series holds the Primetime Emmy Award record for most wins in the Guest Actor and Guest Actress categories for a single series. A total of forty-one nominations went to the show, of which 15 were won. Camryn Manheim was the first actress to win an Emmy (in 1998) and James Spader, eventually, the last actor. "Happily Ever After", "Betrayal" and "The Day After" were the most nominated episodes, with all two nominations. The series won the Outstanding Drama Series Emmy twice. In both 1999 and 2000, the 52nd and the 53rd Primetime Emmy Awards, the show got nine Emmy nominations.

=== Creative Arts Emmys ===
Year	Category	Nominee(s)	Episode	Result
1999	Outstanding Sound Mixing for a Drama Series	Clark King, Harry Andronis, David John West, and Kurt Kassulke	"Happily Ever After"	Nominated
1999	Outstanding Costuming for a Series	Shelly Levine and Loree Parral	"Of Human Bondage"	Nominated
1999	Outstanding Cinematography for a Series	Dennis Smith	"Happily Ever After"	Nominated
1999	Outstanding Casting for a Series	Janet Gilmore and Megan McConnell		Nominated
2000	Outstanding Casting for a Series	Janet Gilmore and Megan McConnell		Nominated
2001	Outstanding Single Camera Picture Editing for a Series	Susanne Stinson Malles	"The Day After"	Nominated
2001	Outstanding Single Camera Sound Mixing for a Series	Clark King, David John West, Eric Clopein, and David Dondorf	"The Day After"	Nominated
2001	Outstanding Cinematography for a Single Camera Series	Dennis Smith	"The Deal"	Nominated
2001	Outstanding Casting for a Series	Janet Gilmore and Megan McConnell		Nominated

=== Primetime Emmy Awards ===
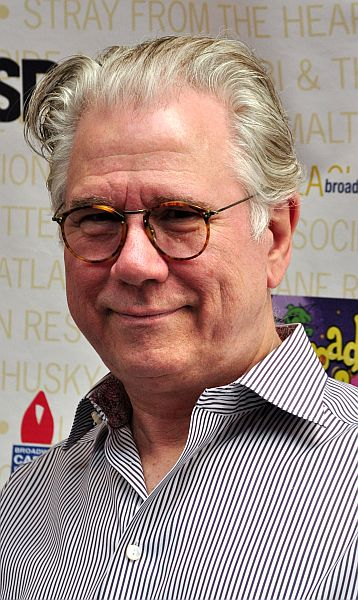
John Larroquette received 2 Primetime Emmy Award nominations and won one.

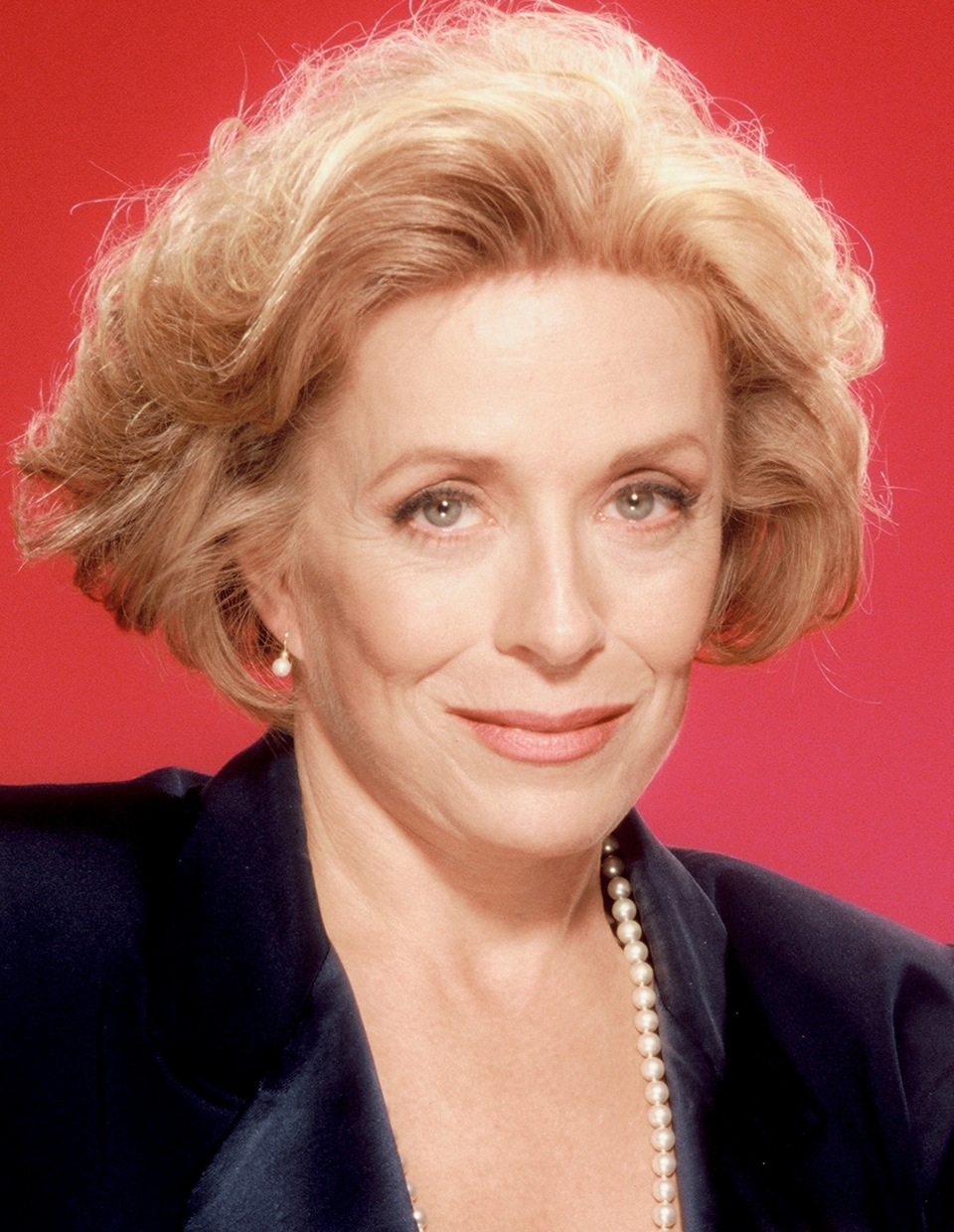
Holland Taylor received 2 Primetime Emmy Award nominations and won one.

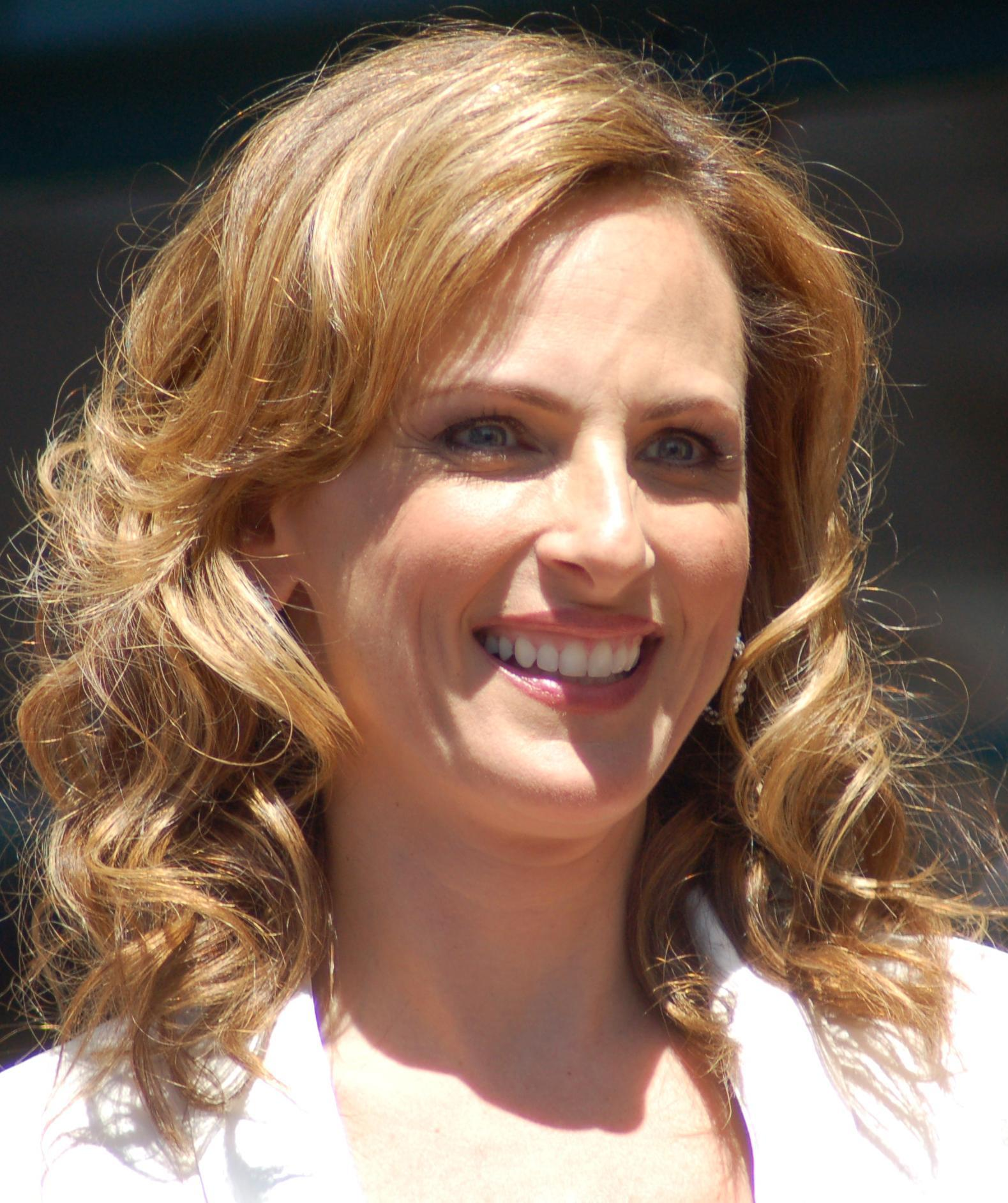
Marlee Matlin received one Primetime Emmy Award nomination.

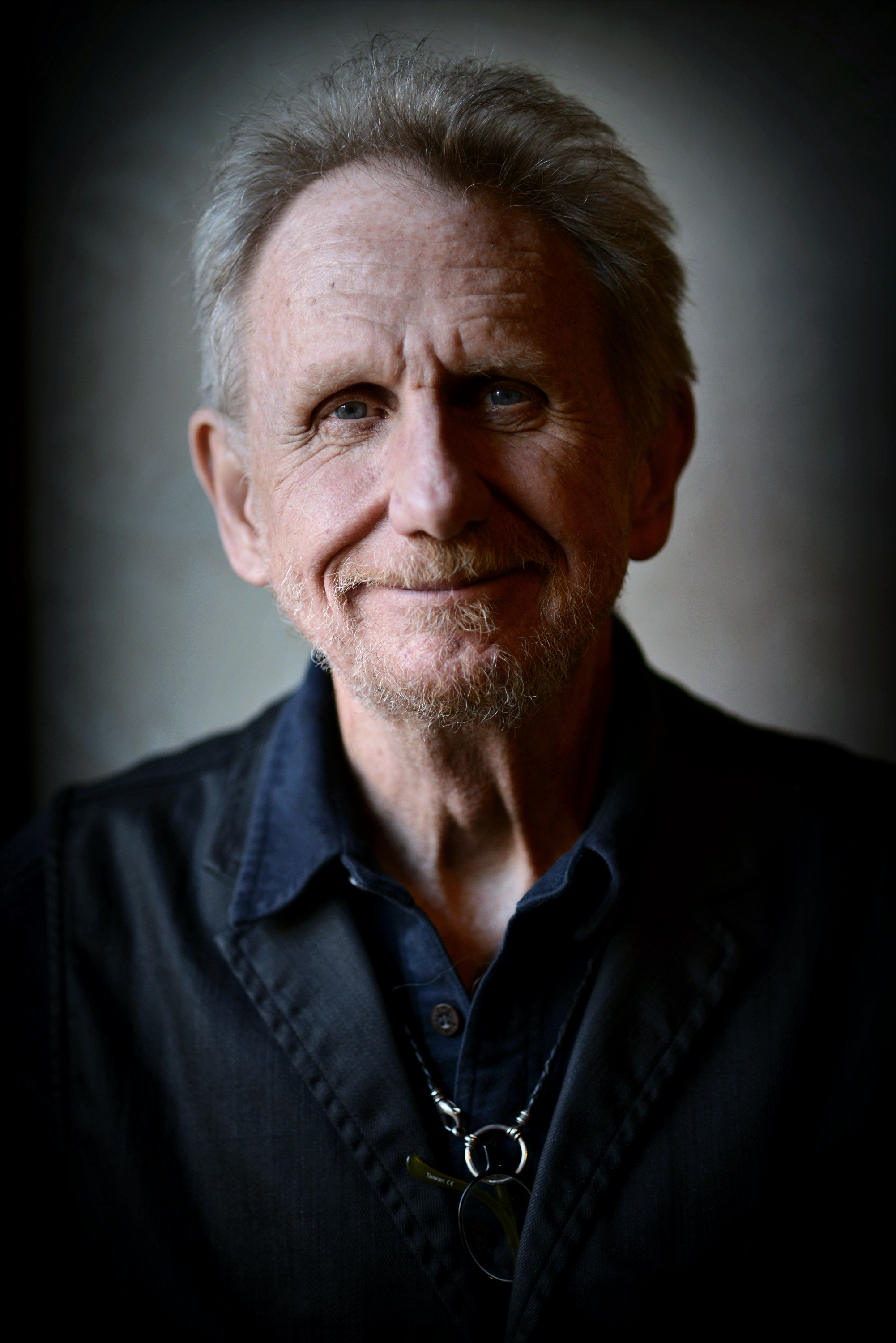
René Auberjonois received one Primetime Emmy Award nomination.

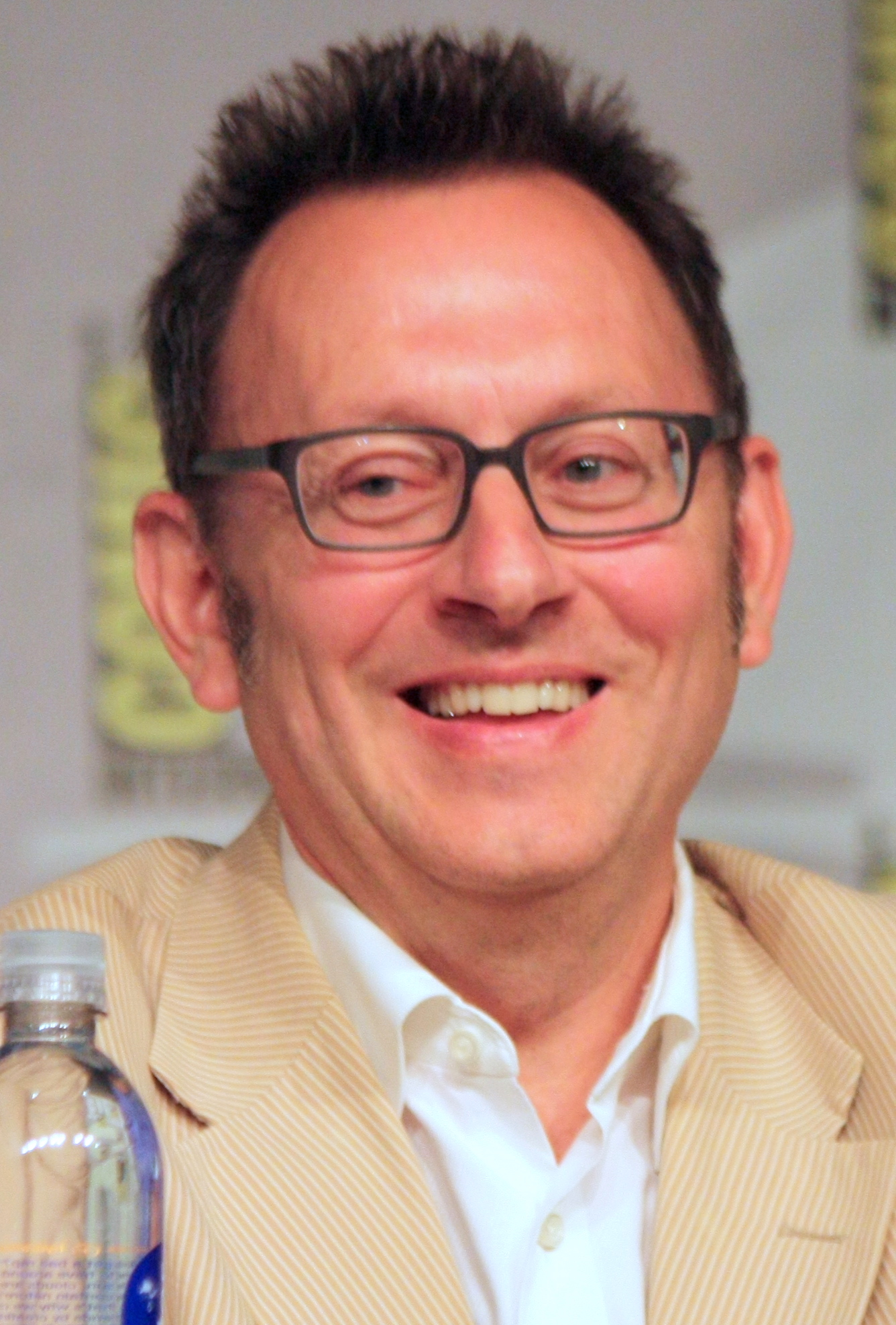
Michael Emerson received one Primetime Emmy Award.

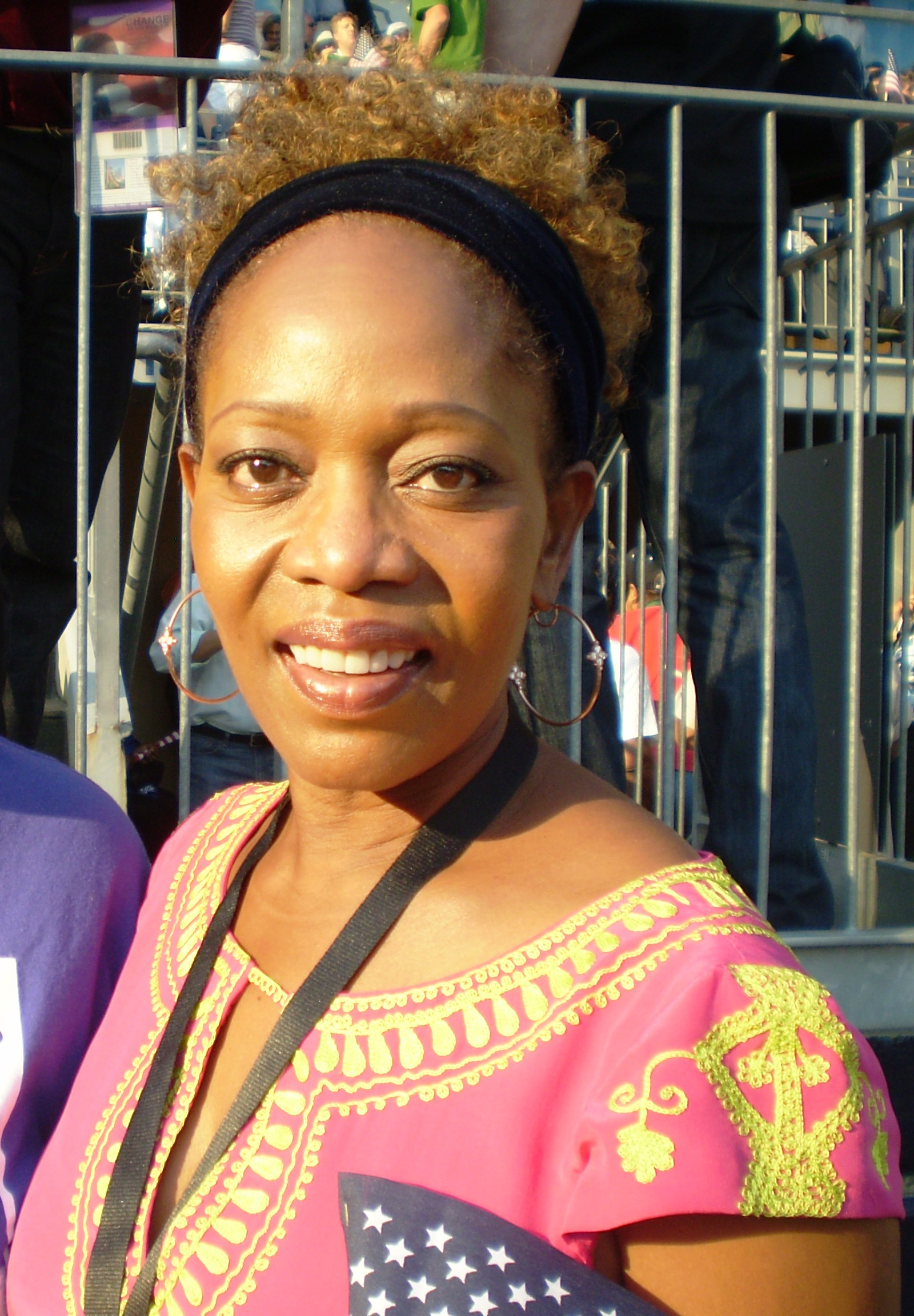
Alfre Woodard received one Primetime Emmy Award.

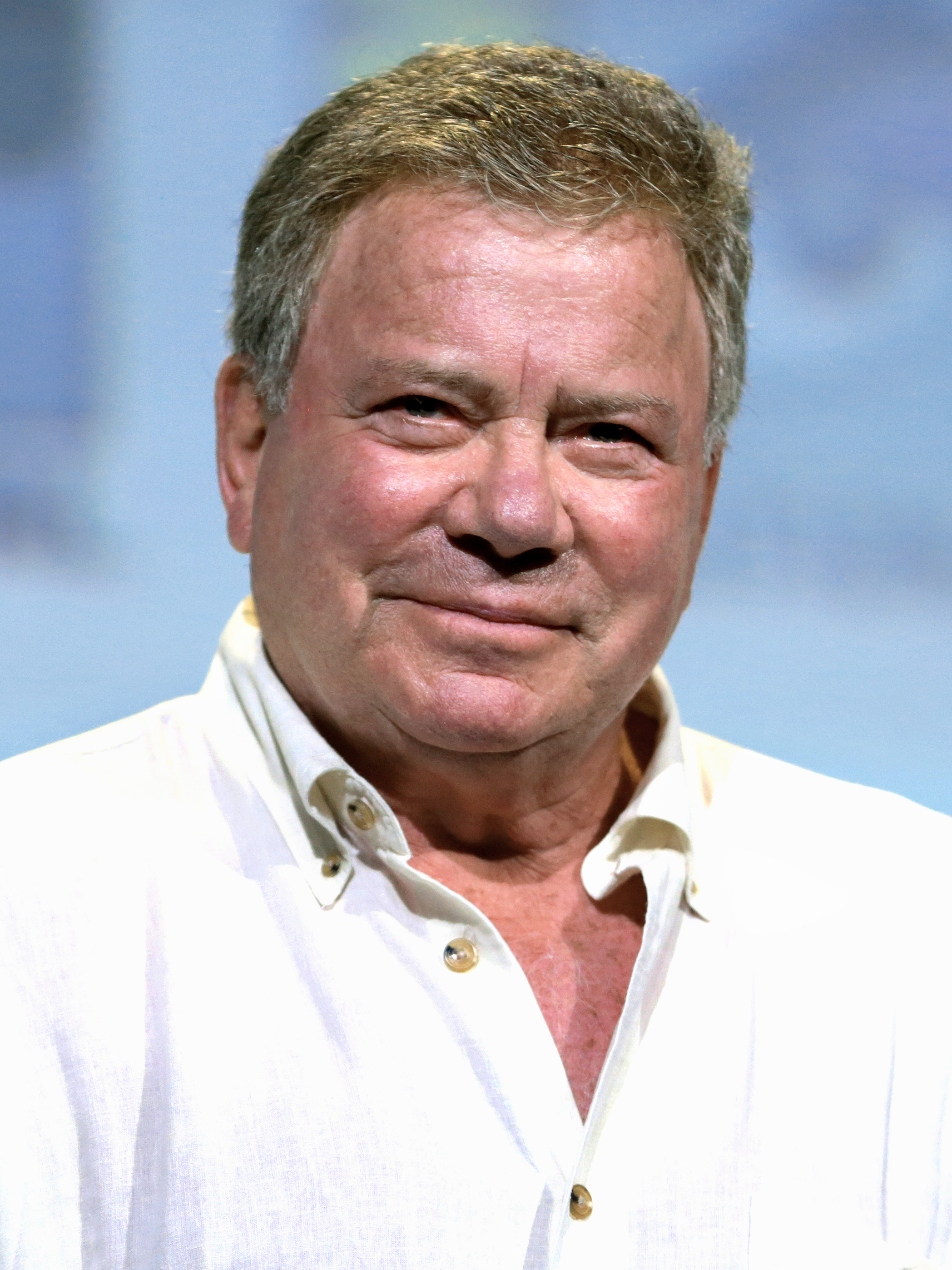
William Shatner received one Primetime Emmy Award.

Year	Category	Nominee(s)	Episode	Result
1998	Outstanding Writing for a Drama Series	David E. Kelley	"Betrayal"	Nominated
1998	Outstanding Supporting Actress in a Drama Series	Camryn Manheim as Ellenor Frutt		Won
1998	Outstanding Guest Actor in a Drama Series	John Larroquette as Joey Heric	"Betrayal"	Won
1998	Outstanding Drama Series	David E. Kelley, Jeffrey Kramer, Robert Breech, Ed Redlich, Gary M. Strangis, Alice West, Jonathan Pontell, Christina Musrey, and Pamela J. Wisne		Won
1999	Outstanding Supporting Actress in a Drama Series	Camryn Manheim as Ellenor Frutt		Nominated
1999	Outstanding Supporting Actress in a Drama Series	Lara Flynn Boyle as Helen Gamble		Nominated
1999	Outstanding Supporting Actor in a Drama Series	Steve Harris as Eugene Young		Nominated
1999	Outstanding Lead Actor in a Drama Series	Dylan McDermott as Bobby Donnell		Nominated
1999	Outstanding Guest Actor in a Drama Series	Tony Danza as Tommy Silva	multiple episodes	Nominated
1999	Outstanding Supporting Actress in a Drama Series	Holland Taylor as Judge Roberta Kittleson		Won
1999	Outstanding Supporting Actor in a Drama Series	Michael Badalucco as Jimmy Berluti		Won
1999	Outstanding Guest Actor in a Drama Series	Edward Herrmann as Atty. Anderson Pearson	several episodes	Won
1999	Outstanding Drama Series	David E. Kelley, Jeffrey Kramer, Robert Breech, Gary M. Strangis, Christina Musrey, and Pamela J. Wisne		Won
2000	Outstanding Supporting Actress in a Drama Series	Holland Taylor as Judge Roberta Kittleson		Nominated
2000	Outstanding Supporting Actor in a Drama Series	Steve Harris as Eugene Young		Nominated
2000	Outstanding Supporting Actor in a Drama Series	Michael Badalucco as Jimmy Berluti		Nominated
2000	Outstanding Guest Actress in a Drama Series	Marlee Matlin as Sally Berg	"Life Sentence"	Nominated
2000	Outstanding Guest Actor in a Drama Series	Henry Winkler as Henry Olson	"Race Ipsa Loquitor"	Nominated
2000	Outstanding Guest Actor in a Drama Series	Paul Dooley as Judge Philip Swackheim	"Loosers Keepers" and "Day In Court"	Nominated
2000	Outstanding Drama Series	David E. Kelley, Jeffrey Kramer, Robert Breech, Gary M. Strangis, Christina Musrey, and Pamela J. Wisne		Nominated
2000	Outstanding Guest Actor in a Drama Series	James Whitmore as Raymond Oz	"Oz" and "Legacy"	Won
2000	Outstanding Guest Actress in a Drama Series	Beah Richards as Gertrude Turner	"Till Death Do Us Part (Part 1)"	Won
2001	Outstanding Guest Actor in a Drama Series	René Auberjonois as Judge Mantz	"We Hold These Truths"	Nominated
2001	Outstanding Drama Series	David E. Kelley, Robert Breech, Christina Musrey, Gary M. Strangis, Pamela J. Wisne, Joseph Berger-Davis, and Todd Ellis Kessler		Nominated
2001	Outstanding Guest Actor in a Drama Series	Michael Emerson as William Hinks	multiple episodes	Won
2002	Outstanding Guest Actor in a Drama Series	Charles S. Dutton as Leonard Marshall	"Killing Time"	Won
2002	Outstanding Guest Actor in a Drama Series	John Larroquette as Joe Heric		Nominated
2003	Outstanding Guest Actress in a Drama Series	Alfre Woodard as Denise Freeman		Won
2004	Outstanding Guest Actress in a Drama Series	Betty White as Catherine Piper		Nominated
2004	Outstanding Guest Actor in a Drama Series	William Shatner as Denny Crane		Won
2004	Outstanding Lead Actor in a Drama Series	James Spader as Alan Shore		Won
2004	Outstanding Guest Actress in a Drama Series	Sharon Stone as Sheila Carlisle		Won

== Golden Globe Awards ==
The Practice was nominated for "Best Television Series - Drama" at the Hollywood Foreign Press Association's Golden Globe Awards three straight years, winning in 1999. Camryn Manheim and Dylan McDermott both won a Golden Globe Award. The series only got nominations in 1999, 2000 and 2001. Manheim won her Golden Globe as a tie with Faye Dunaway for Gia.

Year	Category	Nominee(s)	Result
1999	Best Performance by an Actor in a Television Series - Drama	Dylan McDermott as Bobby Donnell	Won
1999	Best Television Series - Drama		Won
1999	Best Performance by an Actress in a Television Series - Drama	Camryn Manheim as Ellenor Frutt	Won
2000	Best Performance by an Actor in a Television Series - Drama	Dylan McDermott as Bobby Donnell	Nominated
2000	Best Television Series - Drama		Nominated
2001	Best Performance by an Actor in a Television Series - Drama	Dylan McDermott as Bobby Donnell	Nominated
2001	Best Television Series - Drama		Nominated

== NAACP Image Awards ==
A total of eleven NAACP Image Award nominations went to the show of which 6 for Steve Harris. The show was nominated for Outstanding Drama Series three times in a row, but never won. The only NAACP Image Award the show won was awarded to Steve Harris, in the category Outstanding Actor in a Drama Series. The show didn't get any nominations in 2003.

Year	Category	Nominee(s)	Result
1999	Outstanding Actor in a Drama Series	Steve Harris as Eugene Young	Nominated
2000	Outstanding Actor in a Drama Series	Steve Harris as Eugene Young	Nominated
2000	Outstanding Drama Series		Nominated
2000	Outstanding Supporting Actress in a Drama Series	Lisa Gay Hamilton as Rebecca Washington	Nominated
2001	Outstanding Actor in a Drama Series	Steve Harris as Eugene Young	Nominated
2001	Outstanding Drama Series		Nominated
2001	Outstanding Supporting Actress in a Drama Series	Beah Richards as Gertrude Turner	Nominated
2002	Outstanding Actor in a Drama Series	Steve Harris as Eugene Young	Won
2002	Outstanding Drama Series		Nominated
2004	Outstanding Actor in a Drama Series	Steve Harris as Eugene Young	Nominated
2005	Outstanding Actor in a Drama Series	Steve Harris as Eugene Young	Nominated

== Viewers For Quality Television Q Awards ==
The Practice got a total of 16 nominations, and won 6, including: Best Quality Drama Series, Best Supporting Actor in a Quality Drama Series, Best Recurring Player, Best Actor in a Quality Drama Series and Best Supporting Actress in a Quality Drama Series. The series won the Best Quality Drama Series twice out of three nominations, other Q Awards went to Steve Harris, Camryn Manheim and John Larroquette.

Year	Category	Nominee(s)	Result
1998	Best Supporting Actress in a Quality Drama Series	Kelli Williams as Lindsay Dole	Nominated
1998	Best Supporting Actress in a Quality Drama Series	Camryn Manheim as Ellenor Frutt	Nominated
1998	Best Recurring Player	John Larroquette as Joe Heric	Won
1998	Best Supporting Actor in a Quality Drama Series	Michael Badalucco as Jimmy Berluti	Nominated
1998	Best Recurring Player	Linda Hunt as Judge Zoey Hiller	Nominated
1998	Best Quality Drama Series		Won
1998	Best Actor in a Quality Drama Series	Dylan McDermott as Bobby Donnell	Nominated
1998	Best Supporting Actor in a Quality Drama Series	Steve Harris as Eugene Young	Won
1999	Best Quality Drama Series		Won
1999	Best Supporting Actor in a Quality Drama Series	Steve Harris as Eugene Young	Won
1999	Best Supporting Actress in a Quality Drama Series	Camryn Manheim as Ellenor Frutt	Won
2000	Best Supporting Actress in a Quality Drama Series	Camryn Manheim as Ellenor Frutt	Nominated
2000	Best Supporting Actor in a Quality Drama Series	Steve Harris as Eugene Young	Nominated
2000	Best Supporting Actor in a Quality Drama Series	Michael Badalucco as Jimmy Berluti	Nominated
2000	Best Quality Drama Series		Nominated
2000	Best Actor in a Quality Drama Series	Dylan McDermott as Bobby Donnell	Nominated

== Satellite Awards ==
The Satellite Awards, formerly known as the Golden Satellite Awards, are presented both for cinema and television. The Practice only won one award, which went to Camryn Manheim in 2000.

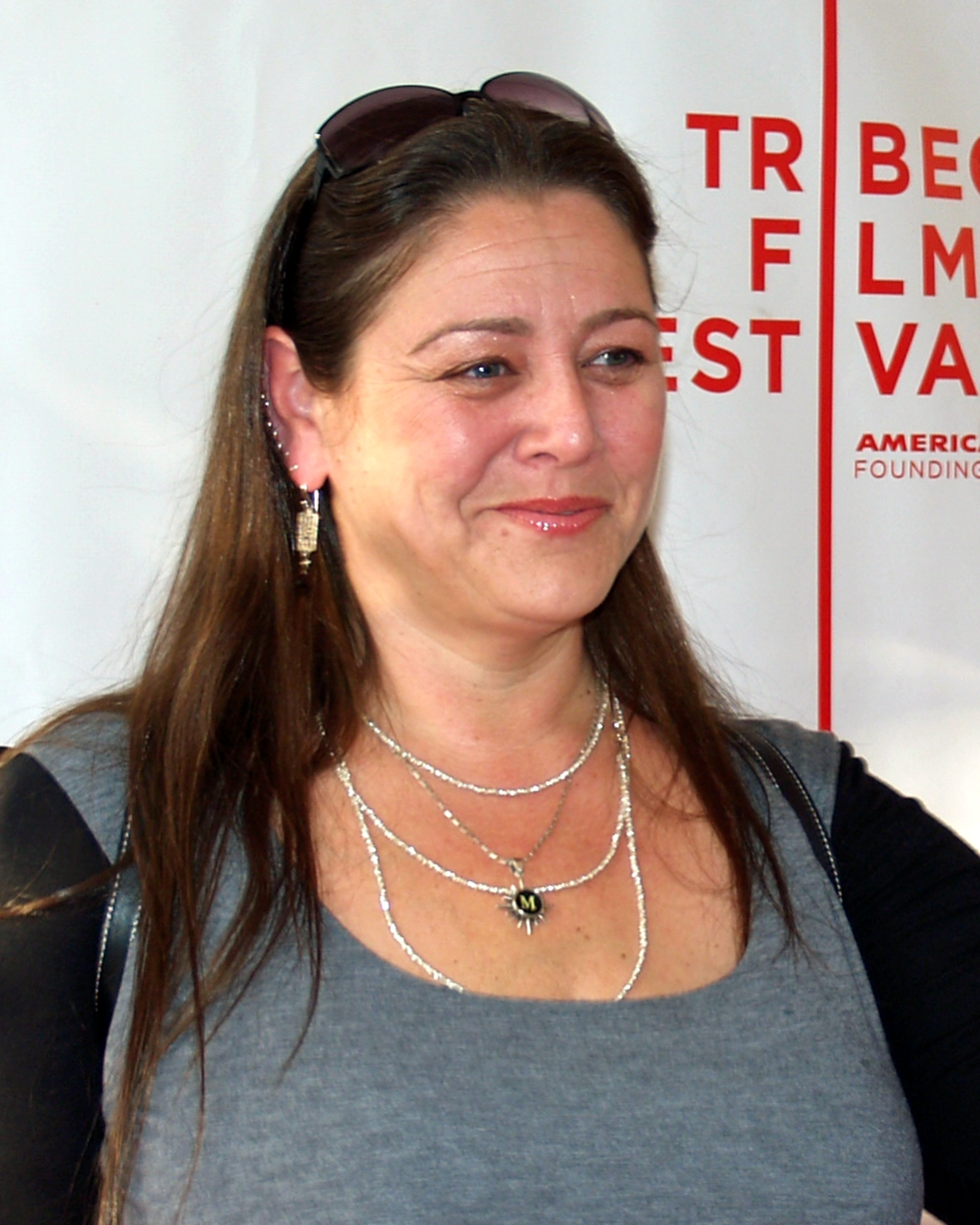
Camryn Manheim received 1 Satellite Award.

Year	Category	Nominee(s)	Result
1999	Best Performance by an Actor in a Television Series - Drama	Dylan McDermott as Bobby Donnell	Nominated
2000	Best Performance by an Actor in a Television Series - Drama	Dylan McDermott as Bobby Donnell	Nominated
2000	Best Television Series - Drama		Nominated
2000	Best Actress - TV Series Drama	Camryn Manheim as Ellenor Frutt	Won
2000	Best Actress - TV Series Drama	Kelli Williams as Lindsay Dole	Nominated
2001	Best Television Series - Drama		Nominated

== Other awards ==
Year	Award	Category	Nominee	Result
2001	Artios Award	Best Casting for TV, Dramatic Episodic	Janet Gilmore and Megan McConell	Nominated
2001	ASCAP Film & TV Music Awards	Top TV Series	Marco Beltrami and Jon Hassell	Won
2002	ASCAP Film & TV Music Awards	Top TV Series	Marco Beltrami and Jon Hassell	Won
2003	ASCAP Film & TV Music Awards	Top TV Series	Marco Beltrami and Jon Hassell	Won
2001	ASC Awards	Outstanding Achievement in Cinematography in Episodic TV Series'	Dennis Smith for episode: "The Deal"	Nominated
2000	BMI Film & TV Awards	BMI Television Music Award	Pete Scaturro & Tom Hiel	Won
2001	BMI Film & TV Awards	BMI Television Music Award	Pete Scaturro & Tom Hiel	Won
2002	BMI Film & TV Awards	BMI Television Music Award	Pete Scaturro	Won
1998	Edgar Award	Best Television Episode	Michael R. Perry, Stephen Gagha & David E. Kelley for episode: "First Degree"	Nominated
2002	Edgar Award	Best Television Episode	Jonathan Shapiro, Lukas Reiter, Peter Blake & David E. Kelley for episode: "Killing Time"	Nominated
2004	Edgar Award	Best Television Episode Teleplay	Peter Blake and David E. Kelley for episode: "Goodbye"	Nominated
1998	GLAAD Media Award	Best Television Episode	episode: "Civil Rights"	Nominated
1999	Genesis Award	Television - Dramatic Series	episode: "The Food Chain"	Won
2003	Genesis Award	Television - Dramatic Series	episode: "Small Sacrifices"	Won
2002	Humanitas Prize	60 Minute Category	Lukas Reiter & David E. Kelley for episode: "Honor Code"	Won
2003	Humanitas Prize	60 Minute Category	David E. Kelley for episode: "Final Judgment"	Won
1998	Golden Reel Award	Best Sound Editing - Television Episodic - Dialogue & ADR		Nominated
2000	Golden Reel Award	Best Sound Editing - Television Episodic - Dialogue & ADR	T.W. Davis, Donna Beltz, Ken Gladden, H. Jay Levine & Debby Ruby-Winsberg	Nominated
1999	PGA Awards	Television Producer of the Year Award in Episodic	^{See below}	Won
2001	PGA Awards	Television Producer of the Year Award in Episodic		Nominated
1999	Peabody Award	Peabody Award	Series	Won
2004	Prism Award	Performance in a Drama Series Episode	Steve Harris as Eugene Young	Nominated
1999	Screen Actors Guild Award	Outstanding Performance by an Ensemble - Drama Series	^{See below}	Nominated
2000	Screen Actors Guild Award	Outstanding Performance by an Ensemble - Drama Series	^{See below}	Nominated
2001	Screen Actors Guild Award	Outstanding Performance by an Ensemble - Drama Series	^{See below}	Nominated
1999	TCA Award	Individual Achievement in Drama	Camryn Manheim as Ellenor Frutt	Nominated
1999	TCA Award	Individual Achievement in Drama	Dylan McDermott as Bobby Donnell	Nominated
1999	TCA Award	Individual Achievement in Drama		Nominated
1999	TCA Award	Program of the Year	Series	Nominated
2000	TCA Award	Outstanding Achievement in Drama		Nominated
2000	TV Guide Award	Favorite Drama Series	Series	Nominated
1999	WGA Television Award	Episodic Drama	David E. Kelley for episode: "Betrayal"	Nominated
1999	Young Artist Award	Best Performance in a TV Drama Series - Guest Starring Young Actor	Billie Thomas role unknown	Nominated
2002	Young Artist Award	Best Performance in a TV Drama Series - Guest Starring Young Actor	Marc John Jefferies as Jason Lees for episode: "Honor Code"	Nominated
2002	Young Artist Award	Best Performance in a TV Drama Series - Guest Starring Young Actress	Jamie Lauren as Betsy Collins for episode: "Inter Arma Silent Leges"	Nominated
2003	Young Artist Award	Best Performance in a TV Drama Series - Guest Starring Young Actress	Jamie Lauren as Betsy Collins for episode: "Inter Arma Silent Leges"	Nominated

^1999 "Television Producer of the Year Award in Episodic" WinnersDavid E. Kelley, Robert Breech, Jeffrey Kramer, Christina Musrey, Gary M. Strangis & Pamela J. Wisne

^1999 and 2000 "Outstanding Performance by an Ensemble - Drama Series" NomineesMichael Badalucco, Lara Flynn Boyle, Lisa Gay Hamilton, Steve Harris, Camryn Manheim, Dylan McDermott, Marla Sokoloff & Kelli Williams

^2001 "Outstanding Performance by an Ensemble - Drama Series" NomineesMichael Badalucco, Lara Flynn Boyle, Lisa Gay Hamilton, Steve Harris, Jason Kravits, Camryn Manheim, Dylan McDermott, Marla Sokoloff & Kelli Williams
