= Summer Run =

Summer Rain
- Directed by: Leon Capetanos
- Written by: Leon Capetanos
- Produced by: Steven Graham
- Edited by: Lewis Teague
- Release date: 1973
- Running time: 96 mins
- Country: United States
- Language: English
- Budget: $250,000

Summer Run is a 1973 American film written and directed by Leon Capetanos.

It was also known as Harry and The Backpack Girls.

The film was finished in 1971, and initially released in 1973, but was frequently retitled and released in different territories until 1977.

Lewis Teague co edited. He later made Dirty O'Neil with Captetanos.

== Premise ==
A young man, Harry, and his best friend, Felix, leave America to backpack through Europe. Arriving first in France, they attempt to woo French women, but cross paths with two American girls, Sam and Debbie, similarly making their way across Europe. Though the quartet seem to enjoy each other's company, Harry feels this is a distraction from the ideal of the trip, and goes off on his own.

Hitchhiking through the countryside, Harry becomes lonely and winds up in Oslo, Norway, where he meets a clerk at the American Express office named Kristina. The two fall in love, even though her boyfriend (whom she has not told him about) warns him their interval would complicate mutual family relationships. Kristina leaves for a previously planned trip to Greece with her family, and Harry returns to France. He reunites with Felix, who is now seeing a French girl, Birgitte, who is ambivalent about American culture. Feeling like a third wheel, he leaves them, and finagles his way to Greece to see Kristina again. He records an audio letter on a record for his family, telling them he has found love and would like to stay overseas.

Harry and Kristina spend an extended time alone together. Upon returning to town to get his mail, he gets a message to contact his family. When he phones them, the tone of his replies to them suggests they are demanding he return home and do not intend to help support his travels. He tells Kristina of his impending return, and while upset, she replies that she would inevitably have to return to her family as well.

Harry returns to France to meet with Felix to take a liner back to America. One of the American girls they met, Sam, is also there, and tells them that while she too is going back, Debbie decided to stay, after having met an older man and deciding to try this new experience rather than wonder what could have been.

The final scene shows Harry with Kristina, as he plays his flute in the street for change, suggesting either he is staying with her in Oslo, or earning enough money to bring her to America.

== Cast ==
- Andrew Parks as Harry
- Dennis Redfield as Felix
- Tina Lund as Kristina
- Juliet Berto as Birgitte
- Phyllis Smith Altenhaus as an American traveler
- John C. Broderick as an American traveler

== Production ==
The film was based on the personal experiences of the director and producer. A limited partnership was formed in Houston to make the film, which was shot in Europe starting in the summer of 1971. Filming took place over eight countries and a period of 56 days.

Andrew Parks, the lead, was the son of actor Larry Parks. Capetanos said "I wanted to make a film about living and having a good time."

== Reception ==
The film screened at the USA Film Festival in Dallas in 1972.

The film was released commercially in 1973. The Los Angeles Times called it "easy, charming."

The film won an award at the Atlanta Film Festival.
