= Pat Anderson =

Pat Anderson may refer to:

- Patricia Anderson (born 1966), American politician
- Pat Anderson (actress), American actress
- Pat Anderson (human rights advocate), Australian human rights advocate and health administrator
