= Candice Rialson =

American actress (1951–2006)

- Born: Candice Ann Rialson; December 18, 1951; Santa Monica, California, U.S.
- Died: March 31, 2006 (aged 54); Palmdale, California, U.S.
- Occupation: Actress

Candice Ann Rialson (December 18, 1951 – March 31, 2006), also known as Candy Rialson, was an American actress known for her starring role in Hollywood Boulevard (1976). According to one obituary, "although never reluctant to take her clothes off, Rialson was always more 'cutie' than sleazy, but she became so notorious for her B-movie work that mainstream directors hesitated to hire her". She has been called "perhaps the best ‘70s exploitation star of them all".

She inspired the character played by Bridget Fonda in Jackie Brown.

== Biography ==
=== Early life ===
Rialson was born in Santa Monica, California, and grew up in Tustin, near Santa Ana in Orange County, California. At age 18, she won Miss Hermosa Beach and worked as a go-go dancer. She studied vet science at UC Davis but quit after a month.

The title of Miss Hermosa Beach led to a small part in The Gay Deceivers (1969), which sparked her interest in an acting career.

=== Exploitation films ===
She was living in Malibu when a neighbor suggested she might be ideal for the lead in a low budget film, Pets (1973). Rialson was cast and her career was launched.

She began to get work on TV appearing in episodes of Shaft, The Magician, Adam's Rib and Maude.

New World Pictures offered her the lead in a "nurses" picture, Candy Stripe Nurses (1974), produced by Julie Corman. This led to a role in another exploitation film, Mama's Dirty Girls (1974) with Gloria Grahame. She had a small part in the TV films The Girl on the Late, Late Show (1974) and Guilty or Innocent: The Sam Shephard Murder Case (1975). Rialson described her part in the latter as "my usual Candice Rialson role, I flirted with him [star George Peppard] and got on the back of his Harley and said a few short, sweet things."

Rialson had a small role in The Eiger Sanction (1975) as an art student in college who volunteers to do anything for her professor, played by Clint Eastwood, in return for a good grade. She returned to New World to star in Summer School Teachers (1975), also produced by Julie Corman. "Candice was a rare combination," said Corman later. "She was a good actress and a beautiful girl. She had a real flair for comedy. She also helped keep a good mood on set which was very important."

Teri Shwartz offered her the lead in a New World Picture about roller skaters, but she turned it down as she did not want to be in any more "three girl" movies. Instead she appeared in one scene in Silent Movie (1976) directed by Mel Brooks, as a nurse who slapped Marty Feldman. However, her scene ended up being reshot with another actress.

Rialson returned to New World to star in Hollywood Boulevard (1976), the directorial debut of Joe Dante and Allan Arkush.

Her last leading role was in Chatterbox (1977), a film for producer Tom DeSimone about a woman with a talking vagina. "I didn't know what it was about when I auditioned but I got the picture real quick," said Rialson later. Bruce Curtis wanted to sign Rialson to a three picture deal but this fell through.

Rialson had a bit part in Logan's Run (1976) and had small roles in Moonshine County Express (1977) and Stunts (1978).

Her final film was the political thriller Winter Kills (1979), playing a girl who rubs John Huston's crotch. "I never took any of it too seriously," Rialson later said. "Everything came easily for me. While there were just as talented and knock down gorgeous actresses out there who couldn't even get agents. I was getting scripts delivered to my house ... I was really busy but I couldn't appreciate that at the time."

According to Diabolique magazine:

Of all the seventies exploitation starlets, I feel Rialson had the best chance of breaking through to mainstream stardom, or at least fame – she was attractive but not threateningly so, affable, skilled at comedy and drama, with a first-rate on-set attitude ... But she never got the chance. In fact out of all the New World female leads, only one, Pam Grier, got the lead in a studio feature, and that was decades later, with Jackie Brown. Rialson, Roberta Collins, Pat Anderson, Claudia Jennings, Rainbeaux Smith ... they all struggled to break through to the next level, leading one to conclude they were simply discriminated against in Hollywood.

=== Retirement ===
Rialson retired from acting to become a wife and mother. "I just didn't want to do it anymore," she later said. She married in 1980 and moved to Studio City, a suburb of Los Angeles, and had one child.

She died of liver disease on March 31, 2006, in Palmdale, California.

== Influence ==
Quentin Tarantino claimed Rialson was the inspiration for Bridget Fonda's character in 1997's Jackie Brown.

== Filmography ==
Year	Title	Role	Notes
1969	The Gay Deceivers	Girl in Bikini	Uncredited
1973	Pets	Bonnie	
1974	Candy Stripe Nurses	Sandy	
1974	The Girl on the Late, Late Show	Janet	TV movie, Uncredited
1974	Mama's Dirty Girls	Becky	
1974	Summer School Teachers	Conklin T.	
1975	The Eiger Sanction	Art Student	
1976	Hollywood Boulevard	Candy Wednesday	
1976	Silent Movie		Uncredited
1976	Logan's Run	1st Screamer in Logan's Apartment	Uncredited
1977	Chatterbox	Penelope	
1977	Moonshine County Express	Mayella	
1977	Stunts	Judy Blake	
1979	Winter Kills	Second Blonde Girl	(final film role)

== Notes ==
- Bass, Ari. "In Search of the Drive In Diva - Candice Rialson, New World's Legendary B Movie Goddess Steamed Up". Femme Fatale. Vol. 2, no. 2.
