= The Triangle (film) =

2001 television film

- Written by: Bing Howenstein; Ted Humphrey
- Directed by: Lewis Teague
- Starring: Luke Perry; Dan Cortese; Olivia d'Abo
- Music by: Lawrence Shragge
- Country of origin: United States
- Original language: English

Production
- Producers: Orly Adelson; Bing Howenstein; J.J. Jamieson; Chris O'Donnell; Frank Siracusa
- Cinematography: Ric Waite
- Editor: Mike Lee
- Running time: 92 minutes
- Production companies: Enlightening Entertainment; George Street Productions; Orly Adelson Productions; Carlton America

Original release
- Network: TBS
- Release: August 13, 2001

The Triangle is a 2001 thriller television movie directed by Lewis Teague and starring Luke Perry and Dan Cortese. Released on August 13, 2001, it was filmed in Barbados and Canada.

== Plot ==
Three high school friends, Stu (Luke Perry), Tommy (Dan Cortese) and Gus (David Hewlett), decide to go on a cruise through the Bermuda Triangle. Stu's fiancée, Julia (Polly Shannon), insists on attending.

When they arrive in Bermuda, Gus and Tommy stumble across a voodoo sacrifice. Gus takes a photo, causing a voodoo priestess to utter a curse under her breath, so they leave.

When Tommy, Gus, Stu and Julia get to the dock, they find that their chartered boat is a wrecker run by Captain Morgan (Dorian Harewood) and Charlie (Olivia d'Abo). They agree to go out. While diving, Julia sees the ghost of a little boy and begins to drown. A heavy fog engulfs the boat and the electronic equipment on board begins to malfunction. Suddenly, a large ship, the RMS Queen of Scots, appears on the horizon. Everyone agrees to board the vessel in order to try and salvage parts to fix Morgan's boat.

They quickly find the captain's log, and they realize that the Queen of Scots was experiencing similar technical difficulties. Morgan insists that he can repair it, and everyone splits up to search for the ship's power source. Morgan and Tommy discover an elevator that is running without power descend to their level. When the door opens, a cricket ball rolls out. They find that Morgan's boat has drifted away.

Captain Morgan decides to go back down to the engine room and attempt to get the engine running, and they split up again. While in a room, Gus sees the same ghost that Stu's fiancée saw, and suffers a fatal heart attack. Stu encounters a vault filled with money and an old cricket bat. He is gathering money when Julia intervenes and tries to stop him, but he kills her in a fit of rage.

Tommy and Charlie both awake from the same nightmare, and discover Gus's body. They frantically look for Stu, but they only find Julia's bloodied flashlight outside the ship's vault. Stu sneaks up on them and throw them in the ballast, locks the door, and begins to flood the compartment with ballast water. They discover the ballast contains the skeletal remains of the ship's passengers and crew. They also find Julia's body and realize that Stu killed her.

Captain Morgan is still working in the engine room and does not hear any of the previous commotion. Stu confronts him, and Captain Morgan is mortally wounded. Before he dies, he tells Tommy that Stu is acting like one of the original passengers on the final voyage of the Queen of Scots, who went crazy and killed everyone with a cricket bat.

Tommy and Charlie attempt to escape, but Stu pursues them. Tommy pushes Stu through a pane of glass, and he and Charlie cover the boat with petrol and attempts to board the small dinghy that originally came from Captain Morgan's boat. Charlie boards the dinghy, but before Tommy has the chance, he is attacked by a bloodied Stu. Charlie loosens the pulley while the cords are entangled around Stu's feet, causing him to be pulled off the ship and hanged. Tommy escapes to the dinghy, and the ship suddenly comes back to life and begins to pursue them. Tommy shoots a flare at the Queen of Scots, igniting the petrol and causing it to explode.

Their dinghy is discovered by patrolmen, and Tommy and Charlie tell them their story. The patrol men are shocked to learn that they are survivors from Captain Morgan's ship, and just before the credits roll, a radio broadcast is heard which reveals Captain Morgan's boat was lost at sea over four years ago, while the movie seemingly transpires over a single day, implying the Bermuda Triangle is a wormhole.

== Reception ==
The film was a ratings hit, becoming the most-watched movie on basic cable during the month of its release. In spite of the film's success with audiences, it was not as well received by critics, as most reviews were mediocre at best. Michael Speier of Variety called it "a B movie in the truest sense of the genre", and went on to criticize its acting and special effects. Tom Shales of The Washington Post had a marginally more positive reaction to the film, noting the appeal of some of the performers and a few impressive effects shots. However, he ultimately panned the film for being dull and slow.
