= Cover Girl Models =

1975 American film directed by Cirio H. Santiago

- Theatrical release poster
- Directed by: Cirio H. Santiago
- Written by: Howard R. Cohen
- Starring: Pat Anderson; Lindsay Bloom; Tara Strohmeier; John Kramer; Mary Woronov
- Production companies: New World Pictures; Premiere
- Distributed by: Filmgroup
- Release date: 1975
- Countries: United States; Philippines
- Language: English

Cover Girl Models is a 1975 exploitation film from New World Pictures about three models who become involved in international espionage.

== Plot ==
Three fashion models travel from Los Angeles to Hong Kong for a shoot. Barbara accidentally comes in possession of some microfilm and is chased by secret service agents. Claire tries to get a role in a film. Mandy tries to make it as a model and falls for their photographer.

== Cast ==
- Pat Anderson as Barbara Cooper
- Lindsay Bloom as Claire
- Tara Strohmeier as Mandy
- John Kramer as Mark
- Rhonda Leigh Hopkins as Pamela
- Mary Woronov as Diane
- Vic Diaz as Kulik
- Tony Ferrer as Ray Chua
- A.C. Castro as rebel leader
- Nory Wright as Tracy Marks
- Mark Lebeuse as Sam Melson
- Ken Metcalfe

== Production ==
The film was one of the last movies New World Pictures made in the Philippines because of rising costs associated with filming there.

== Reception ==
Filmink wrote "Modelling isn't traditionally a great profession for generating screen stories, as any viewer of Models Inc will be able to tell you, and the plots in Cover Girl Models are particularly dumb... There's none of the fun and camaraderie found in the best of these movie... It's a shame, because the leads are strong, particularly Pat Anderson and Tara Stromeiher, who has genuine comic talent."

== See also ==
- List of American films of 1975
