= Moonshine County Express =

1977 film by Gus Trikonis

- Film poster by John Solie
- Directed by: Gus Trikonis
- Written by: Hubert Smith; Daniel Ansley
- Produced by: Ed Carlin
- Starring: John Saxon; Susan Howard; William Conrad
- Cinematography: Gary Graver
- Music by: Fred Werner
- Production companies: Universal Majestic; Sunshine Associates
- Distributed by: New World Pictures
- Release date: 1977
- Running time: 82 mins
- Country: United States
- Language: English
- Budget: $700,000
- Box office: $1 million or $1.1 million

Moonshine County Express is a 1977 action film from New World Pictures.

== Plot ==
Dot refuses to sell out her inheritance—a stockpile of whiskey—when her moonshiner father is murdered by Sweetwater (Morgan Woodward) and his gang by order of Jack Starkey (William Conrad), the local kingpin. Dot and her sisters (played by Claudia Jennings and Maureen McCormick) try to sell the whiskey themselves while avoiding Starkey's men, eventually she gives in to the attentions of J.B. (John Saxon), the local car racer and moonshine runner, so that he will help them sell their stash.

A dog is killed, along with the local mechanic and moonshine salesman, so they decide to get out. While trying to get their stockpile out in a rental truck, they are stopped and shot at by Starkey and one of his men. Just when all hope is lost, the local sheriff shows up (Albert Salmi) and arrests Starkey for murdering their uncle Bill (Dub Taylor), who had sold them out by revealing the location of the stash, but then had the temerity to suggest to Starkey that they split the profits. Dot and J.B decide to leave for California, while Dot teases that she might be willing to lower her standards enough to marry J.B.

== Cast ==
- John Saxon - J.B. Johnson
- Susan Howard - Dot Hammer
- William Conrad - Jack Starkey
- Morgan Woodward - Sweetwater
- Claudia Jennings - Betty Hammer
- Jeff Corey - Hagen
- Maureen McCormick - Sissy Hammer
- Albert Salmi - Sheriff Larkin
- Dub Taylor - Uncle Bill
- Len Lesser - Scoggins
- Candice Rialson - Mayella
- E. J. André - Lawyer Green

== Production ==
The film at one stage was known as Shine. The film was shot in Nevada City, California. Maureen McCormick recalled drug use was rife on set, writing in her memoirs that "Our crew was more like a pharmaceutical convention than a movie. Aside from John Saxon, Susan Howard, and a few other straight arrows, I could barely go thirty minutes without someone asking if I wanted a bump." She and Claudia Jennings became close friends on the film and Jennings had an affair with Gary Graver.

== Release ==
The Los Angeles Times called it "an unpretentious and engaging exploitation film... with a subtle and endearing love story."

Roger Corman, head of production at New World, always thought one of the reasons the film was so popular was because it did not put down Southern people. "There's a tendency very often for people coming out of Hollywood and New York to consciously or unconsciously insult the sensibilities of the southerners, and I think Moonshine County Express was a success partially because it’s a low-budget film that’s quite well made and that presents a very fair viewpoint." It was one of several Corman-financed movies starring John Saxon.

=== DVD ===
Moonshine County Express has been released on DVD and a Blu-ray (currently out of print) was released by Code Red DVD.
