= Mama's Dirty Girls =

1974 film by John Hayes

- Directed by: John Hayes
- Written by: Gil Lasky
- Produced by: Ed Carlin; Gil Lasky
- Starring: Gloria Grahame; Paul Lambert; Candice Rialson; Sondra Currie
- Cinematography: Henning Schellerup
- Edited by: Luke Porano
- Music by: Don Bagley; Steve Michaels
- Distributed by: Premiere Releasing Org.
- Release date: August 1974
- Running time: 82 minutes
- Country: United States
- Language: English

Mama's Dirty Girls is a 1974 American exploitation film directed by John Hayes and starring Gloria Grahame and Candice Rialson. It was written by Gil Lasky. A woman and her three daughters murder men for money.

Producer Ed Carlin later commented, "If you haven’t seen it, you didn’t miss much."

== Plot ==
Mama loves men, but she loves money even more. She's trained her three teenage daughters to meet, marry and murder men for their money. But soon they meet Harold and he's got other plans.

== Cast ==
- Gloria Grahame as Mama Love
- Paul Lambert as Harold
- Sondra Currie as Addie
- Candice Rialson as Becky
- Mary Stoddard as Cindy
- Christopher Wines as Sheriff
- Anneka De Lorenzo as Charity

== Production ==
The film was shot in seven consecutive twelve-hour working days. According to writer John Dorr, "The people in charge were middle-aged men who had made their money in the pornography market. For them. Mama’s Dirty Girls was a step toward legitimacy and a larger potential market. One of the producers wrote the story himself. He knows what his audience likes: sexy young girls and dirty old men."

== Reception ==
The Pittsburg Press film critic wrote "There's a kernel of a good idea in the story...but Dirty is so ineptly written and filmed, the kernel isn't even heated, much less popped."

In a contemporary review for the Los Angeles Times, Dennis Hunt "lamented Gloria Grahame’s participation in Mama’s Dirty Girls, recalling her past successes as a “top film star,” including an Academy Award for her supporting role in The Bad and the Beautiful (1952). Hunt criticized the film as a “tawdry trifle,” but he asserted that Grahame's performance was sometimes impressive." He added "Given the title, the film should be brimming with sex and violence, but there is really not much mayhem and most of the sex scenes are mild and understated."

Diabolique magazine wrote "The acting is fine and it’s a great concept...but the movie is never as much fun as you want it to be. They didn’t quite get the story right – the pace is too slow, unlike Big Bad Mama where there’s lots of action; here it’s mostly hanging around houses, and there’s no driving narrative. Also, who wants to watch a three girls film where the guys triumph?"

Shock Cinema wrote that Grahame was "looking pretty pasty here, and wayyyy beyond her 49 years. Still, Hayes uses her well (and her daughters even better), and always gives his slobbering audience what it wants, including murder, deception, greed, nekkid ladies, and guys led around by their dicks. The result is white-trash sleaze that hits all of the required bases, and does so in an efficient 80 minutes."

== See also ==
- List of American films of 1974

== Notes ==
- Dorr, John (1975). "The Independents". Method to the madness : (Hollywood explained). Prince Publishers. pp. 101–112.
