= Pets (film) =

- Directed by: Raphael Nussbaum
- Written by: Raphael Nussbaum
- Starring: Candice Rialson
- Release date: February 1974
- Country: United States
- Language: English

Pets is a 1974 film starring Candice Rialson as a runaway who has various adventures.

== Cast ==
- Candice Rialson as Bonnie
- Joan Blackman as Geraldine Mills
- Ed Bishop as Victor Stackman
- Mike Cartel as Bonnie's brother
- K.T. Stevens as Mrs. Daubrey

== Reception ==
According to Diabolique magazine "The main reason to watch it is Rialson, who has to carry the whole movie on her shoulders and is very impressive... she’s very natural on screen, comfortable with her body, believable in the role and sexy as hell, although she doesn’t get to show off her comic ability, so effective in later films."

== See also ==
- List of American films of 1974
