= Paul Lambert (actor) =

American actor (1922–1997)

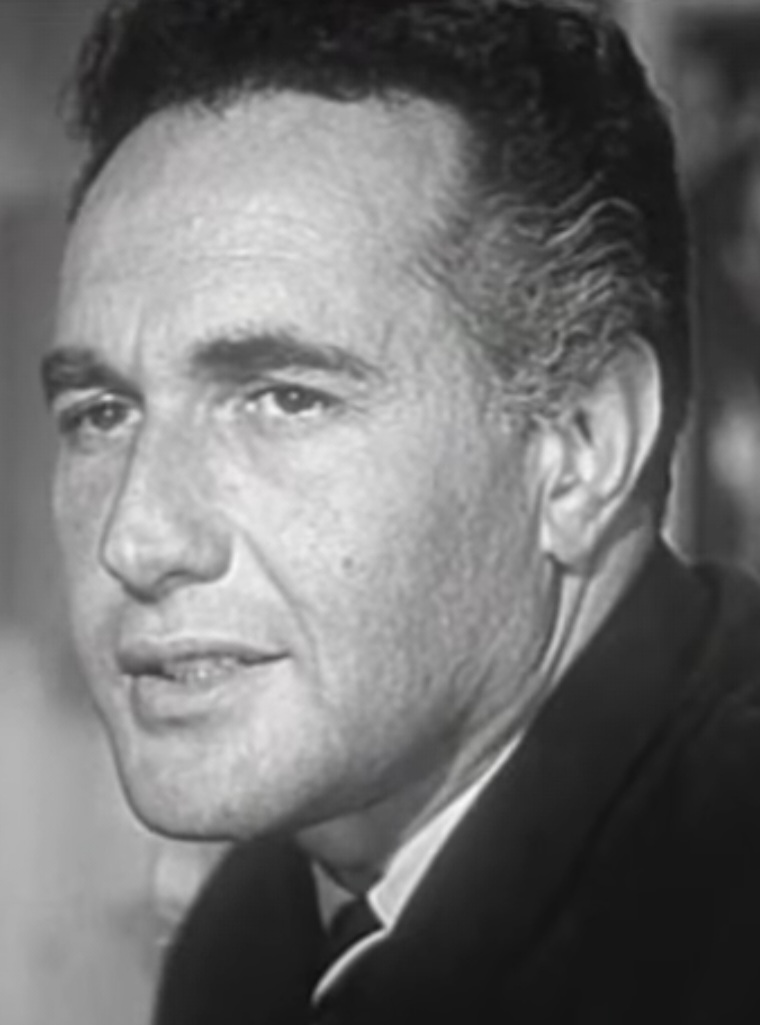
- Lambert in an episode of Lock-Up, 1959
- Born: August 1, 1922; El Paso, Texas, U.S.
- Died: April 27, 1997 (aged 74); Santa Monica, California, U.S.
- Occupation: Actor
- Years active: 1956–1995

Paul Lambert (August 1, 1922 – April 27, 1997) was an American character actor who appeared in movies and on television.

== Early life ==
Lambert was born in El Paso, Texas, and grew up in Kansas City, Missouri. During World War II, he was a lieutenant in the Army Air Forces.

== Career ==
He trained at the Actors' Lab in Los Angeles and then moved to New York City, where he first worked Off Broadway, subsequently appearing with Rod Steiger on Broadway in a revival of Clifford Odets's Night Music (a credit that is often misrepresented as A Little Night Music because of the similarity of the titles and the fact that the Sondheim musical featured an actor named Mark Lambert).

Among his major films were Spartacus (his movie debut), Planet of the Apes (in a brief role as a simian minister), and All the President's Men, in which he played the national editor of The Washington Post.

It was on television that Lambert played his biggest roles. He acted on 300 shows and appeared fourteen times on CBS's Playhouse 90 anthology series, more than any other actor. He appeared twice in the role of Yates in the 1962 syndicated adventure series The Everglades with Ron Hayes. Lambert was a frequent guest star on 1960s television (including roles Gunsmoke, and in Gene Barry's TV Western Bat Masterson, in 1959 as unscrupulous financier Charles Hamilton in the episode "Flume to the Mother Load", and in 1960 as the crooked Augustus Ulbrecht in "The Rage of Princess Ann") and was able to maintain a successful career into the 1990s.

Lambert was often able to secure billing that eluded his contemporaries, such as the coveted title-sequence billing he received both times he appeared on The Man From U.N.C.L.E., in "The Bow-Wow Affair" (1965) and "The Take Me To Your Leader Affair". He played a doctor in the 1960 Twilight Zone episode "King Nine Will Not Return". He also appeared in three episodes of the CBS courtroom drama series Perry Mason, twice in 1961: as Ben Nicholson in "The Case of the Envious Editor", and as murdered news correspondent Lawrence Vander in "The Case of the Renegade Refugee". He also appeared as Del Compton in the 1965 episode, "The Case of the Mischievous Doll". He was recognized for playing the French-Canadian revolutionary Durain in The Wild Wild West episode "The Night of the Firebrand". He appeared in a 1973 Barnaby Jones episode titled, "Sing a Song of Murder".

== Death ==
Lambert died at the age of 74 at St. John's Medical Center in Santa Monica, California, where he resided.

== Filmography ==
Year	Title	Role	Notes
1958	Girls on the Loose	Joe	
1960	Spartacus	Gannicus	
1962	House of Women	Richard Dunn	
1966	The Russians Are Coming, the Russians Are Coming	Minor Role	Uncredited
1966	Hogan's Heroes	Major Hegel, Gestapo	Diamond in the Rough (episode 2.3) 30 September
1967	The Big Mouth	Moxie	
1968	Planet of the Apes	Minister	
1969	All the Loving Couples	Irv	
1969	Pate Katelin en Buenos Aires		
1969	Cry for Poor Wally	Wally's Father	
1970	Bande de cons!		
1971	The Windsplitter	Reverend	
1971	A Gunfight	Ed Fleury	
1972	The Godfather	Mobster at Funeral with Barzini	Uncredited
1972	Where Does It Hurt?	Dr. Pinikhes	
1972	Play It as It Lays	Larry Kulik	
1973	American Graffiti	Sleeping Police Officer	Uncredited
1974	Mama's Dirty Girls	Harold	
1974	The Missiles of October	John A. Scali	
1976	All the President's Men	National Editor	
1976	Sparkle	Moe	
1979	Apocalypse Now	Messenger for Willard	Uncredited
1979	Scavenger Hunt		Uncredited
1982	Death Wish II	New York Police Commander	
1982	Wrong Is Right	Defense Secretary	
1983	Blue Thunder	Holmes	
1983	Cracking Up	Joe - Carpet Installer	
1985	Avenging Angel	Arthur Gerrard	
1986	Soldier's Revenge	General Burns	
1986	The Perils of P.K.		
1992	Rain Without Thunder	Swedish Doctor	
