= Fools' Parade =

1971 film by Andrew V. McLaglen

- Theatrical release poster
- Directed by: Andrew V. McLaglen
- Screenplay by: James Lee Barrett
- Based on: Fools' Parade; 1969 novel by Davis Grubb
- Produced by: Andrew V. McLaglen
- Starring: James Stewart; George Kennedy; Strother Martin; Kurt Russell; William Windom; Mike Kellin; Kathy Cannon; Morgan Paull; Anne Baxter
- Cinematography: Harry Stradling, Jr.
- Edited by: David Bretherton, A.C.E. Robert Simpson
- Music by: Henry Vars
- Color process: Eastmancolor
- Production companies: Stanmore Productions and Penbar Productions, Inc.
- Distributed by: Columbia Pictures
- Release date: August 18, 1971
- Running time: 98 minutes
- Country: United States
- Language: English

Fools' Parade is a 1971 American crime drama period film directed by Andrew V. McLaglen, starring James Stewart and George Kennedy, with supporting roles by Strother Martin, Kurt Russell, William Windom, Mike Kellin and Anne Baxter. It is based on the novel of the same name by Davis Grubb. The film is also known as Dynamite Man from Glory Jail.

== Plot ==
In 1935, the one-eyed murderer, Mattie Appleyard, who refers to his obviously unmatched glass eye with the persona, "Tighe", bank robber Lee Cottrill, and a young convict named Johnny Jesus are released on the same day from the West Virginia State Penitentiary, located in the fictional town of Glory. Appleyard is issued a check for $25,452.32 for his 40 years of prison work, a substantial amount during the Great Depression. Appleyard and Cottrill have long been planning to establish and work together in their own independent retail grocery store, to be located in a distant West Virginia coal camp community where, at the time, was served by only a coal-company store.

All three of the released men are escorted by prison Captain and Sunday School teacher, "Doc" Council, to the local train station in the fictional Glory, West Virginia. Some time after departing from Glory on the train, Appleyard realizes that his check is redeemable only in person, back at the local bank in Glory. Council has previously plotted with Glory banker, Homer Grindstaff, to ensure that the check is never cashed, and accepts a cash advance from Grindstaff for the anticipated killing of Appleyard, Cottrill and Johnny Jesus. Council tells Grindstaff that this blood money will go, in part, toward missionary funding and vacation bible school.

Council and his accomplices, Steve Mystic and a "nice religious boy" and cracked ice-sucking radio singer named Junior Kilfong, travel to another train stop down the line to kill Appleyard, Cottrill and Johnny Jesus at night. Mystic has previously told Kilfong that Appleyard, Cottrill and Johnny Jesus are all atheists, and at a depot down the line from Glory, the uncertain Kilfong asks Mystic to confirm to him that the three released prisoners are atheists.

Informed of the plot by guilt-ridden conductor, Willis Hubbard, the three former prisoners thwart the plan. Kilfong shoots mining supply salesman, Roy K. Sizemore. Council kills the wounded Sizemore and places the blame on Appleyard, who escapes with Sizemore's supply of dynamite.

The next day, Council goes to the bank to update Grindstaff. As they talk, Appleyard walks in with some of the dynamite strapped to his chest, and the remainder in a suitcase. Appleyard threatens to blow them all up, "and half this city block", if the banker does not cash his check. Grindstaff reluctantly complies.

Appleyard and his friends, who followed him back to Glory, split up, planning to meet again later. While waiting at the rendezvous, Cottrill is talked into boarding a houseboat owned by a down-on-her-luck prostitute named Cleo for a drink of whiskey. Also aboard is Chanty, a sixteen-year-old who Cleo has taken in, hoping to sell her virginity for $100.

Appleyard and Johnny show up, but are tracked down by Council and his bloodhound. The three friends get away in a skiff, leaving behind the suitcase of dynamite. Johnny is worried about what Council will do to Chanty, so they turn around and go back when Council leaves.

Before leaving, Council tells Cleo about Appleyard's money. At gunpoint, Appleyard gives her the suitcase that she believes contains the money, in exchange for Chanty. After they leave, Cleo tries to shoot open the locked suitcase, and blows up the houseboat, killing herself. The fugitives become trapped on a boxcar by Council. The train is a "fools' parade", as described by Appleyard, going nowhere beyond the local train yard. Luckily for them, guilt-ridden train conductor Willis Hubbard returns and helps them escape. However, he is too afraid of Council to tell the police what he knows.

Council, Mystic and Kilfong track them to an abandoned house. Council decides that he does not want to share the loot, so he kills his two confederates. He shoots out a window, wounding Appleyard. Johnny throws a stick of dynamite at Council, but Council's bloodhound fetches it and brings it back. Appleyard hastily throws it out of the window, killing Council.

The men are arrested, and Appleyard's money is confiscated, but Hubbard confesses the truth, and Grindstaff is arrested. Appleyard and his friends are exonerated, and Appleyard is allowed to cash his check.

== Cast ==
- James Stewart as Mattie Appleyard
- George Kennedy as "Doc" Council
- Anne Baxter as Cleo
- Strother Martin as Lee Cottrill
- Kurt Russell as Johnny Jesus
- William Windom as Roy K. Sizemore
- Mike Kellin as Steve Mystic
- Katherine Cannon as Chanty
- Morgan Paull as Junior Kilfong
- Robert Donner as Willis Hubbard
- David Huddleston as Homer Grindstaff
- James Lee Barrett as Sonny Boy
- Dort Clark as Enoch Purdy
- Kitty Jefferson Doepken as Clara
- Dwight McConnell as Station Master
- Richard Carl as Police Chief
- Arthur Cain as Prosecuting Attorney

== Production ==
Fools' Parade was filmed entirely in Marshall County, West Virginia. Davis Grubb, author of Fools' Parade, was born and raised in Moundsville, where most of the filming took place. The production crew used the Baltimore and Ohio Railroad throughout filming, mainly at the Moundsville station, which was demolished in 1980.

== Reception ==
Tony Mastroianni of the Cleveland Press said that it "leans heavily on Stewart's skill, personality and built-in folksiness. Time and again he gives you the impression of an interesting character that really isn't there in the role."

From the review at the UK website, The Movie Scene: "James Stewart ... is central to the movie working, but it also features some nice and unexpected performances from the other stars such as Kurt Russell and George Kennedy. It also has a surprisingly good storyline which has a couple of layers of unexpected depth. Yet because some of it is played out for laughs it left me unsure...the light-hearted moments (seem) a bit strange..."

== See also ==
- List of American films of 1971
