= Stunts (film) =

1977 film directed by Mark L. Lester

- Theatrical release poster
- Directed by: Mark L. Lester
- Written by: Dennis Johnson; Barney Cohen; Michael Harpster (scenario); Robert Shaye (scenario)
- Based on: Story by Raymond Lofaro original idea and treatment by Shaye
- Produced by: Raymond Lofario; William N. Panzer
- Starring: Robert Forster
- Cinematography: Bruce Logan
- Edited by: Corky Ehlers
- Music by: Michael Kamen
- Production companies: New Line Cinema; Mark Fleischman Productions; Spiegel-Bergman Productions
- Distributed by: New Line Cinema
- Release date: August 17, 1977
- Running time: 89 minutes
- Country: United States
- Language: English
- Budget: $600,000
- Box office: $2 million

Stunts, also released as The Deadly Game, is a 1977 American adventure thriller film set in the world of movie stunt performers directed by Mark L. Lester and starring Robert Forster, Fiona Lewis and Ray Sharkey. The first film produced by New Line Cinema, Stunts was part of a late 1970s/early 1980s cycle of stunt performer films that included stunt man-turned-director Hal Needham's Hooper (1978) and Richard Rush's The Stunt Man (1980).

== Plot summary ==
The film opens on an unseen figure tampering with a helicopter harness. The next morning, stuntman Greg Wilson wakes up in bed next to a blonde woman. He rides his motorcycle to the set, late for a shoot. In the stunt, he is the passenger in a skiing car. He climbs out the window and grabs onto the skid of a helicopter, which climbs to a great height. During the ascent, Greg tries to attach his harness, but finds that the hook will not close. He loses his grip and falls to his death.

His brother Glen arrives on the set with reporter B.J. Parswell in tow. She is there to write about the dangers of stunt work. The producer of the film, Alvin Blake, introduces Glen to his wife Judy and asks him to join the production. He reluctantly agrees. Greg is then given a stuntman's funeral, in which one of his colleagues drives his motorcycle off a cliff. Judy later comes onto Glen, revealing that she was sleeping with Greg and wants to see if his brother is as much fun in bed. Glen turns her down.

Meanwhile Glen joins the film's stunt team. They are a close-knit group that promise each other they would pull the plug on each other if they are ever left in a vegetative state.

Patti and Chuck Johnson are married members of the team, and they are beginning to think about having a baby. After Patti tells Chuck that she has stopped taking birth control, he loses his nerve on a 6-story fall he is supposed to take off a roof. Chuck asks Glen to switch places with him, and he takes Greg's place on the stunt team that is climbing up the building during the scene. As Glen is on the roof, shooting at the climbers during the scene, Chuck's harness fails, and he plummets to the ground. Hospitalized in a vegetative state, a tearful Glen pulls the plug on Chuck.

Realizing the tampered harness was meant for him, Glen promises B.J. that he will get revenge. In a stunt where he is supposed to emerge from a burning building while completely on fire, stuntman Paul is inside the building lighting it on fire for the shot. As he tries to exit, an unseen figure traps him inside, leading to his death.

On the day that Glen is to recreate the helicopter stunt that killed Greg, B.J. discovers that Blake is responsible for the murders. He is jealous of his wife's infidelity. She rushes to the set to stop the stunt, but it is already in progress. Blake flees in his convertible. He has loosened the skid on the helicopter, and it is starting to fall off as Greg hangs from it. B.J. tells him over the radio that Blake is the murderer. Glen directs the helicopter to hover over Blake's car. He jumps into it, just as the helicopter skid finally breaks free. Glen wrestles with Blake and jumps free of the car, just before it crashes and bursts into flames, killing Blake.

== Cast ==
- Robert Forster as Glen Wilson
- Fiona Lewis as B.J. Parswell
- Ray Sharkey as Paul Salerno
- Joanna Cassidy as Patti Johnson
- Bruce Glover as Chuck Johnson
- Richard Lynch as Pete Lustig
- Darrell Fetty as Dave Allison, the kid
- James Luisi as Alvin Blake, the producer
- Candice Rialson as Judy Blake
- Malachi Throne as Earl O'Brien, the director

== Production ==
Stunts was Bob Shaye's first movie for New Line Cinema and was also the company's first full-length feature film production; for the previous 10 years they had existed solely as a distribution company. "They were distributing Truck Stop Women to college campuses and they already had a script, so I was hired to direct it," said the director Mark Lester. "We hired Robert Forster because he had done Medium Cool. Don Stroud was supposed to star in it but he got into a motorcycle accident the night before shooting."

Stunts was filmed in San Luis Obispo, California.

Candice Rialson makes one of her final appearances.
