= T Bone N Weasel =

- Genre: Comedy
- Based on: T Bone N Weasel by Jon Klein
- Screenplay by: Jon Klein
- Directed by: Lewis Teague
- Starring: Gregory Hines; Christopher Lloyd
- Theme music composer: Steve Tyrell
- Country of origin: United States
- Original language: English

Production
- Executive producer: Scott Rosenfelt
- Producers: Samuel Benedict; Mark Levinson
- Cinematography: Thomas Del Ruth
- Editor: Raja Gosnell
- Running time: 94 minutes
- Production company: Turner Pictures

Original release
- Network: TNT
- Release: November 2, 1992

T Bone N Weasel is a 1992 television film directed by Lewis Teague and starring Gregory Hines and Christopher Lloyd. It is based on Jon Klein's 1986 play of the same name.

The Los Angeles Times called it "a surprisingly jaunty comedy."

== Cast ==
- Gregory Hines as T Bone
- Christopher Lloyd as William "Weasel" Weasler
- Ned Beatty as Doc Tatum
- Rip Torn as Happy Sam
- Graham Jarvis as Mr. Fergus
- Wayne Knight as Roy Kramp
- Rusty Schwimmer as Verna Mae
- Larry Hankin as Rev. Gluck
- Sam Whipple as Raincoat
- Candy Aston as Mom on Beach
- Denise S. Bass as Waitress
- J. Michael Hunter as Foreman
- Lloyd Wilson as Eviction Officer
