= Chatterbox (1977 film) =

1977 comedy film directed by Tom DeSimone

Chatterbox (Virginia the Talking Vagina)
- Theatrical release poster
- Directed by: Tom DeSimone
- Screenplay by: Mark Rosin; Norman Yonemoto
- Story by: Tom DeSimone
- Produced by: Bruce Cohn Curtis
- Starring: Candice Rialson; Larry Gelman; Jane Kean; Arlene Martel; Irwin Corey; Rip Taylor; Sandra Gould
- Cinematography: Tak Fujimoto
- Edited by: William Marlin
- Music by: Fred Karger
- Production company: Lips Productions
- Distributed by: American International Pictures
- Release date: February 1977 (U.S.)
- Running time: 73 minutes
- Country: United States
- Language: English

Chatterbox (addressed in the opening credits as Chatterbox!; also known as Virginia the Talking Vagina) is a 1977 American comedy film directed by Tom DeSimone and produced by Bruce Cohn Curtis. The film stars Candice Rialson. Also starring in the film is Rip Taylor.

The film is about a woman with a talking vagina. A hairdresser who discovers her vagina has the power of speech after it derisively comments on a lover's performance. Her talking vagina has a mind of its own, which includes a desire to sing; they wind up exploited by her psychiatrist, who launches her on a career in show business. According to Michael Medved in The Golden Turkey Awards, the talking vagina precipitates many developments in her life:

Escapades include a sojourn in jail with a basketball team and sessions with a psychiatrist to help Virginia overcome her (its?) emotional problems. With her self-confidence restored, she makes several hit appearances on TV talkshows; the theory, apparently, is that Virginia makes an even more interesting late-night guest than Truman Capote.

== Plot ==
Penelope, a young hairdresser, discovers her vagina can talk when it criticizes a lover's performance, who leaves in a huff. At the salon where she works, her talking vagina insults a lesbian client, who mistakes it for Penelope flirting with her, which leads to her being fired. Penelope goes to a psychiatrist, Dr. Pearl, where she reveals her "problem". In the psychiatrist's office, her vagina reveals a new talent, singing. It has a propensity for singing show tunes. Dr. Pearl reveals her secret to friends of his in show business. At a meeting of the American Medical Association, Penelope and her talking vagina, now called "Virginia", are revealed to the public for the first time. Virginia regales the assembled physician with show tunes. Dr. Pearl becomes her agent, and over Penelope's objections, launches Penelope and Virginia on an entertainment career. At a show hosted by Professor Irwin Corey, Virginia sings in public for the first time, becoming a star after crooning a disco tune. Virginia increasingly becomes the tail that wags the dog, with Penelope becoming increasingly unhappy as "they" become a successful act on a cross-country tour. Despite her new success, Penelope decides to kill herself until she sees the lover from the start of the movie and discovers that he has a talking penis.

== Cast ==
- Candice Rialson as Penelope Pittman
- Larry Gelman as Dr. Werner Pearl
- Jane Kean as Eleanor Pittman
- Arlene Martel as Marlene
- Michael Taylor as Dick
- Cynthia Hoppenfeld as Linda Ann
- Robert Lipton as Jon David
- Rip Taylor as Mr. Jo
- Professor Irwin Corey as himself
- Sandra Gould as Mrs. Bugatowski
- Georgia Schmidt as Charity Woman

== Critical reception ==
Chatterbox was poorly received by audiences.

The Los Angeles Times said "the film's vulgar premise smacks of smirking adolescents, its crude one liners, full of foul language that unsuccessfully try to stretch to into a full-length movie... the movie is a male masturbatory fantasy."

Diabolique magazine wrote that "there are actually worse concepts for a comedy, and with really smart handling this could have been worth watching – maybe even been quite feminist. But as used here the film is far too depressing" arguing that Rialson's character suffers too much in the film. "A lesbian tries to rape her, she’s put naked on a board in front of a room of scientists while her vagina sings (and she’s clearly not having a good time), she’s forced to perform a big song and dance number where her clothes get ripped off, her love interest is an insecure drip...if I’m not mistaken she’s also gangbanged." The magazine did say that "Rialson is very engaging in the picture, as usual... and manages to take the sleaze out of everything her character does (and still be sexy). There’s something actually quite moving watching her try so hard in a role that is killing her career with every minute of screen time."
