= Tara Strohmeier =

American actress (born 1955)

Tara Lorraine Strohmeier (born April 12, 1955) is an American former actress who appeared in B-movies in the 1970s; many of them were made for drive-in theaters and have since acquired large cult followings.

Her biggest roles were in The Great Texas Dynamite Chase (1976), as the sister of Claudia Jennings, and Van Nuys Boulevard (1979) playing a sexy car-hop who falls in love with a hot-rodder.

She also played "Jill McBain" in Joe Dante's Hollywood Boulevard (1976), and appeared in three films by Jonathan Kaplan: The Student Teachers (1973), Truck Turner (1974) and 11th Victim (1979). Her other film credits include Dirty O'Neil (1974), Candy Stripe Nurses (1974), Cover Girl Models (1975), the John Landis cult-comedy The Kentucky Fried Movie (1977), and Malibu Beach (1978).

Retired from acting, Strohmeier lives in Orange County, California with her two sons.
