= Morgan Paull =

Actor (1944-2012)

- Born: December 15, 1944; Wheeling, West Virginia, U.S.
- Died: July 17, 2012 (aged 67); Ashland, Oregon, U.S.
- Occupation: Actor
- Years active: 1970–1996
- Spouses: Gaye Huston (m. 1965; div. 1976) Carmen Paull (m. 1976; div. 1990) April Paull (m. 1990, divorced) Jenny Elam (m. 2004)
- Children: 2

Morgan Paull (December 15, 1944 – July 17, 2012) was an American actor. He was most known for playing Dave Holden in the Ridley Scott film Blade Runner.

== Early life ==
Morgan Paull was born to a wealthy family in Wheeling, West Virginia and appeared in many high school plays. When he told his father that he wanted to attend Boston University to continue acting, his father disagreed with his plans and Morgan ran off. He went to the Barter Theatre in Abingdon, Virginia, and then later appeared on Broadway in New Faces of 1965 and the off-Broadway show That Thing at the Cherry Lane.

== Career ==
After moving to LA, he appeared in Muzeeka at the Mark Taper Forum and caught the attention of director Franklin Schaffner and producer Frank McCarthy. He made his acting debut in the 1970 film Patton playing Captain Richard N. Jenson. He was in the 1971 film Fools' Parade with Jimmy Stewart and the 1976 film The Last Hard Men with Charlton Heston. He is also known for playing the scheming Philip Wendell in the 1978 American television miniseries Centennial and a greedy businessman in the 1984 comedy Surf II.

== Personal life ==
Until his death he resided in Lake Arrowhead in the mountains northeast of Los Angeles in the San Bernardino National Forest about 90 miles (140 km) from Hollywood. Paull was married four times, first to Gaye Huston in 1965 until they divorced in 1976. He was then married to Carmen Paull from 1976 to 1990, which ended in divorce. He was then married to April Paull in 1990 until that marriage ended in divorce. He was married to Jenny Elam in 2004 until his death in 2012. Paull had two daughters.

Paull died on July 17, 2012, from stomach cancer in his home in Ashland, Oregon. He is buried in the Paull family plot, located in section 10 of Greenwood Cemetery, Wheeling, Ohio County, West Virginia.

== Filmography ==
=== Film ===
Year	Title	Role	Notes
1970	Patton	Captain Richard N. Jenson	
1971	Fools' Parade	Junior Kilfong	
1973	Cahill U.S. Marshal	Struther	
1974	Dirty O'Neil	Jimmy O'Neill	
1975	Live A Little, Steal A Lot	Arnie Holcomb	
1975	Mitchell	Salvatore Mistretta	
1976	The Last Hard Men	Portugee Shiraz	
1977	Twilight's Last Gleaming	First Lt. Louis Cannellis	
1978	The Swarm	Dr. Newman	
1979	Norma Rae	Wayne Billings	
1979	The Apple Dumpling Gang Rides Again	Corporal #1	
1980	Fade to Black	Gary Bially	
1982	Blade Runner	Dave Holden	
1984	Surf II	Chuck's Dad	
1986	GoBots: Battle of the Rock Lords	Matt Hunter	Voice
1989	Out Cold	Hunter #1	
1996	Uncle Sam	Mayor	(final film role)

=== Television ===
Year	Title	Role	Notes
1963	The Doctors		Episode: "The Young Spinning Wheels"
1965	The Patty Duke Show	Roger	Episode: "My Cousin the Heroine"
1970	Dan August	Gibbs	Episode: "Love Is a Nickel Bag"
1971	Bearcats!	Don Kemper	Episode: "The Big Guns"
1971-1972	The F.B.I.	Nat Wenning/Tony Baughmiller	2 episodes
1972-1973	Ironside	Pete Karns/Martin Lowell	2 episodes
1973	Emergency!	Dr. Mike Williams	Episode: "Rip-Off"
1974	Petrocelli	Dan Carter	Episode: "Edge of Evil"
1974-1975	Gunsmoke	Ham/Brinker	2 episodes
1975	Stowaway to the Moon	Astronaut Dave Anderson	TV film
1975	The Kansas City Massacre	Alvin "Creepy" Karpis	TV film
1975	The Blue Knight	Phil Davis	Episode: "Two to Make Deadly"
1975	The Waltons	Frank Taylor	Episode: "The Emergence"
1976	Bronk	Lacy	Episode: "Death with Honor"
1977	McCloud	Pierre Belsen	Episode: "The Moscow Connection"
1977	The Fantastic Journey	Argon	Episode: "A Dream of Conquest"
1978	Chico and the Man	Secret Service Agent	Episode: "Buenas Dias, Mr. President"
1978	Baa Baa Black Sheep	Congressman Mackintosh	Episode: "Ten'll Get You Five"
1979	Quincy, M.E.	Defense Attorney	Episode: "Walk Softly Through the Night"
1979	Centennial	Philip Wendell as Adult	Episode: "The Winds of Death"
1980	Beyond Westworld	Parker	Episode: "Parker"
1983	The Fall Guy	Captain Jones	Episode: "Win One for the Gipper???"
1984–85	Challenge of the GoBots	Matt Hunter, Scorp	9 episodes
1986	Crazy Like a Fox	Frank Butler, Jr.	Episode: "Hearing Is Believing"
