= Jeffrey Kramer =

American actor (born 1945)

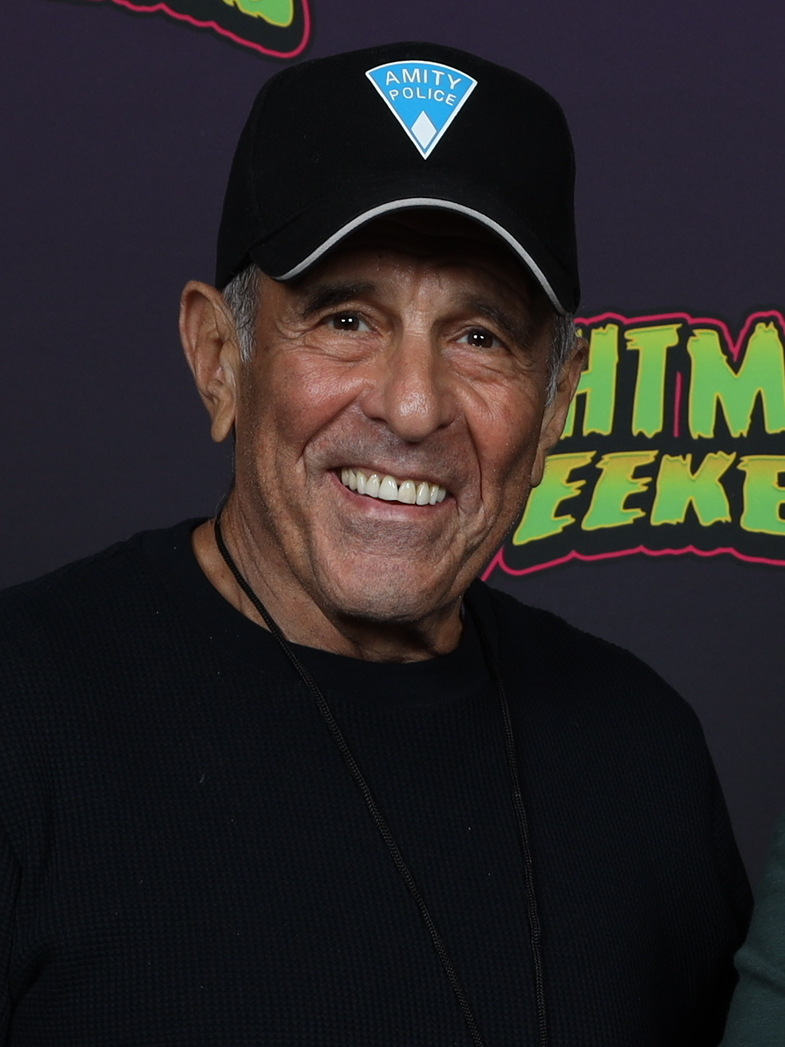
- Kramer at Nightmare Weekend Richmond in 2023
- Other names: Glance Heavenward; Jeffrey C. Kramer; Jeff Kramer
- Occupations: Actor; television producer
- Years active: 1975–2007

Jeffrey Kramer (born July 15, 1945) is an American film and television actor and producer.

== Life and career ==
Kramer grew up in Teaneck, New Jersey, graduating from Teaneck High School with the Class of 1963 and attending Ithaca College on an acting scholarship.

He made his first appearance on the TV series Barney Miller in the episode "Snow Job". In Jaws, he played Deputy Hendricks, and he reprised the role in the sequel Jaws 2 in 1978; in 1976, he guest-starred in Baretta. He appeared in the Joe Dante cult classic Hollywood Boulevard. He appeared in the horror film Halloween II playing Graham, a dentist who examines dead Ben Tramer's body, believing him to be Michael Myers. He made an appearance on Happy Days in two episodes: The People vs. the Fonz and Fonzie the Flatfoot. He worked on the 1989 film The 'Burbs and has produced many independent projects.

== Awards ==
Year	Result	Award	Category/Recipient(s)
2000	Nominated	Emmy Award	Outstanding Drama series for: The Practice (1997) shared with: David E. Kelley (executive producer); Robert Breech (co-executive producer); Gary M. Strangis; Pamela J. Wisne; Christina Musrey
1999	Won	Emmy Award	Outstanding Comedy Series for: Ally McBeal (1997) shared with: David E. Kelley (executive producer); Jonathan Pontell (co-executive producer); Mike Listo; Steve Robin; Pamela J. Wisne; Peter J. Burrell (coordinating producer); Outstanding Drama Series for: The Practice (1997) shared with: David E. Kelley (executive producer); Robert Breech (co-executive producer); Gary M. Strangis; Christina Musrey; Pamela J. Wisne
1998	Won/Nominated	Emmy Award	Outstanding Drama Series for: The Practice (1997) shared with: David E. Kelley (executive producer); Robert Breech (supervising producer); Ed Redlich; Gary M. Strangis; Alice West; Jonathan Pontell; Christina Musrey (co-producer); Pamela J. Wisne (co-producer); Outstanding Comedy Series for: Ally McBeal (1997) shared with: David E. Kelley (executive producer); Jonathan Pontell (supervising producer); Mike Listo; Steve Robin (co-producer); Pamela J. Wisne (co-producer)
1998	Won	Monitor Award	Film Originated Television Series - Best Achievement for: Ally McBeal (1997) shared with: David E. Kelley; Jonathan Pontell; Mike Listo; Steve Robin; Pamela J. Wisne; For episode "Cro-Magnon".
1999	Won	Television Producer of the Year Award in Episodic Series	For: The Practice (1997) shared with: David E. Kelley; Robert Breech; Christina Musrey; Gary M. Strangis; Pamela J. Wisne

== Filmography ==
=== Actor ===
- Barney Miller (1975, TV series) - Stick Up Man
- Jaws (1975, as Jeffrey C. Kramer) - Deputy Hendricks
- Baretta (1976, TV series) - Junkie
- Speeding? (1976, short film) - Speeder
- Hollywood Boulevard (1976) - Patrick Hobby
- Chico and the Man (1976, TV series) - Rojo
- Stick Around (1977, TV) - Ed
- You Light Up My Life (1977) - Background Singer
- Jaws 2 (1978) - Deputy Hendricks
- Soap (1978, TV series) - Policeman #2
- Struck by Lightning (1979, TV series) - Ted Stein
- M*A*S*H (1977–1980) (TV series) - Driver
- Laverne & Shirley (1978–1981, TV series) - Jeff
- Halloween II (1981) - Graham
- Heartbeeps (1981) - Party Butler Robot
- The Incredible Hulk (1982, TV series) - Marty Gibbs
- Inside the Love House (1983) - Rick
- Happy Days (1975–1984, TV series) - Lefty/Martin Smith
- American Dreamer (1984) - Gold Buddy #3
- Santa Claus: The Movie (1985) - Towzer
- Clue (1985) - The Motorist
- Hero and the Terror (1988) - Dwight
- The 'Burbs (1989) - Voiceover actor (voice)
- Ally McBeal (1997, TV series) - Pedestrian

=== Producer ===
- Armed & Famous (2007, TV series)
- Bigfoot Presents: Meteor and the Mighty Monster Trucks (2006, TV series)
- The Big Empty (2003)
- A Time for Dancing (2000)
- The Practice (1997–1999, TV series)
- Ally McBeal (1997–1999, TV series)
- Chicago Hope (1994, TV series)
