= Eugene Young (character) =

Fictional character from The Practice

Eugene Young is a fictional character played by Steve Harris on the American legal drama The Practice, created by David E. Kelley. Eugene was one of the original cast members and stayed as a main character until the end of the series, which ran between 1997 and 2004.

At the opening of the series, Eugene played an attorney working for Bobby Donnell, and before long was made a partner along with Lindsay Dole and Ellenor Frutt, precipitating the firm changing its name to Donnell, Young, Dole, and Frutt. In one of the first episodes, Eugene comments that he has been a lawyer for seven years ("Trial and Error"). He had been the first to join Bobby, several years before the start of the show (he may or may not have done so immediately upon his becoming a lawyer). He was a private investigator before that, and his detective skills (including some strong-arm tactics) come up from time to time in his legal career.

Like many of the attorneys on the series, Eugene's home life is tumultuous—while identified as married in the fifth episode, the tenth episode states him as being separated (and in all probability that was the case from the onset of the series). Still, in that episode, "Dog Bite," he turns down a date from an attractive D.A., though his reason for doing so is because his son "is not ready for that." Soon the divorce is finalized and his wife takes custody of their son, who is only about twelve years old at the time. Eugene struggles to be a good father and to keep his son on the straight and narrow. He admits more than once that part of what drives him is that his brother died in prison after being falsely convicted. His dream was always to change the system for the better, and one avenue of how to do that he long thought of was an appointment as a judge.

At some point in his life, Eugene was pulled over and beaten by the police for matching the general description of a wanted suspect. Perhaps as a direct result of that, Eugene (especially in the series' early seasons) had no problem playing the "race card" to get some of his African American clients off the hook. It also prompted him to get involved with the defense of a police officer who was fired for admitting that he had a racial problem ["First Degree"]. The police officer felt that his years on the force had turned him into a racist, and was seeking disability and an early pension. Even though the thought of giving admitted racist disability benefits was uncomfortable, Eugene felt that there was an opportunity for the greater good—-it might prompt more police officers to admit when they are having problems with racism. In the course of that proceeding, Eugene did allow his pent-up feelings regarding his beating-down to seep through, angrily charging that "racism is a cancer that must be eradicated where you find it" and that it is an epidemic in the police department.

Like most of the other members of the firm (and ironically Alan Shore), Eugene opposes the death penalty. In one of the final episodes of the series' run, when a panel of judges questions his position, he passionately and honestly defends it. ["New Hoods on the Block"]

Eugene's character for the first seven seasons is in many ways intended to be a foil for Bobby Donnell. One of the key elements of the show is the conflict that arises when legal ethics may violate moral ethics. While Bobby constantly struggles with this, Eugene typically remains more stoic, though at times even he admits to feeling empty.

A few examples of the above include:

- When Bobby was having an improper affair with one of their clients (a woman accused of murder) Eugene constantly asserted that Bobby's judgment was impaired. He even stated "Never fall in love with a client" should be the first thing they teach you in law school. When Bobby finally realized he had lost his edge because of his feelings, Eugene had to make an impromptu closing argument in the trial. ["Reasonable Doubts"]
- After a young girl gives birth to a stillborn baby at home (unbeknownst to anyone), the parents of the mother (who is still in high school) want to abandon the body for fear that their daughter might be implicated in the child's death. Eugene is distraught when Bobby breaks the law by advising the parents to deliver the baby to the steps of a church he knows of. Bobby admits it has nothing to do with the law, but his religious beliefs compel him to see that the baby is not merely dumped without a funeral. ["A Day in the Life"]

However, as stated, sometimes Eugene's strict "by-the-book" approach gets the better of him.

- Eugene is assigned to defend a young black man with a criminal record who is accused of armed robbery. Eugene is not interested in whether or not the young man is guilty, as he has no intention of having him testify. While Eugene successfully gets him off, the young man is angered that Eugene does not believe he is telling the truth. Rather than feel elated at winning the case, Eugene ends up at a bar reflecting on how cynical the practice of law can leave attorneys from time to time.

When Bobby leaves the firm, Eugene becomes the senior partner, with Jimmy Berluti being elevated to full partner. Against his better judgment, he allows Eleanor Frutt to hire Alan Shore, an unscrupulous lawyer who consistently butts heads with both Eugene and Jimmy. After continuous unethical (and even illegal) behavior by Shore, in addition to the conflicts with the firm, Eugene decides with Jimmy (but not Eleanor) to fire Shore, giving him a small severance package. Shore sued the firm based on wrongful termination, as he had over the previous eight months brought in substantially more money for the firm than all the partners combined. Shore wins the case, which directly causes a breakdown at the firm.

At that time, Jimmy decides to quit the firm, and Eugene has a meeting with a lawyer at a top firm, though he has no interest in joining. The meeting was, in fact, merely a pretense for the lawyer to interview with Eugene, as he has been recommended to be appointed as a Superior Court Judge. After a hearing before a review panel where Eugene is grilled over various topics (including the death penalty) where Eugene stands his ground and Bobby appears to speak on his behalf, Eugene is appointed to the bench. At first, his decision to accept upsets Eleanor, as she feels he is abandoning the firm, just like all the others, but she soon accepts his decision. Eugene's first case as a judge is about a wheelchair-using woman charging her employer with sex offenses. However, he leaves the case when he sees Alan Shore representing the defendant, thinking that Alan had judge-shopped when Alan was only assigned the case on the hearing day (being a friend of Denny Crane, the defendant hesitated before going to Crane, Poole & Schmidt for help). To resolve their issues, Alan tells Eugene that his respect for him exceeds that of the respect he is required to give any other judge.
