= Dirty O'Neil =

1974 film by Lewis Teague

- US film poster
- Directed by: Leon Capetanos (as Howard Freen); Lewis Teague
- Written by: Leon Capetanos (as Howard Freen)
- Produced by: John C. Broderick
- Starring: Morgan Paull; Art Metrano; Pat Anderson; Jeane Manson; Katie Saylor
- Cinematography: Stephen M. Katz
- Music by: Raoul Kraushaar
- Production company: American International Pictures
- Distributed by: United Producers Releasing Organization
- Release date: May 1974
- Running time: 89 minutes
- Country: United States
- Language: English
- Budget: $200,000

Dirty O'Neil is a 1974 American crime comedy film directed by Leon Capetanos and Lewis Teague.

== Plot ==
Jimmy O'Neil, a cop in a small California town with a fondness for women, is forced into action when a trio of homicidal thugs invade the town.

== Cast ==
- Morgan Paull as Jimmy O'Neill
- Art Metrano as Lassiter
- Pat Anderson as Lizzie
- Jeane Manson as Ruby
- Katie Saylor as Vera
- Raymond O'Keefe as Lou
- Tommy J. Huff as Bennie
- Bob Potter as Al
- Sam Laws as Clyde
- Liv Lindeland as Mrs. Crawford
- Kitty Carl as Bobby
- Tara Strohmeier as Mary
- Susan McIver as Helen

== Production ==
Morgan Paull later claimed Harrison Ford auditioned for the role Paull played. He called Dirty O'Neill "the lowest budget movie in history, believe me… I mean our lunch was whatever they could find at a local hotdog stand. But it was a lead role and it was supposed to be funny, a takeoff on all the cop movies that were going on… And it had potential of being funny. Art Metrano was funny and I was trying to be somewhat funny… And the premise was funny. But you know – it was what it was." He added, " I was happily married at the time so it was the greatest waste of talent in my life."

The film's original title was The Love Life of a Cop. According to producer John Broderick it was "a light comedy about a cop in a small town and a bunch of girls who freak out about his uniform. He's prone to non violence but when a lot of violence comes to town he has to deal with all these murders." Broderick said the distributors suggested he change the title to Dirty O'Neill. "I told them, 'Won't that seem too much like Dirty Harry?' And these guys said, 'Don't we wish'."

== Reception ==
John Broderick said "people are going to see it and they seem to like it. What makes it visible is it's just a light comedy, not anything pretentious that makes you uncomfortable."

== Home media ==
CODE RED, in association with Metro-Goldwyn-Mayer (MGM), released DIRTY O'NEIL on homevideo for the first time via Blu-ray in March 2022. Distributed by KINO-LORBER, the disc went out of print in late 2024. The sleeve art advertised a "Brand New 2k Master" of the film.

=== Critical ===
Variety hypothesized the filmmakers "may have had a lower-budget Electra Glide In Blue in mind when they started this project, but it quickly turns into a sexploitationer... Only near the windup of the film is there any police action... Handsomely photographed by some uncredited cinematographer, it gives the film a professional gloss that makes it look better than it is. Should please most of the sex and action crowd if they have the patience to sit through the other half of the bill."

In the Los Angeles Times, Kevin Thomas called the film "a decidedly minor effort... this unabashed male chauvinist fantasy" which "does demonstrate that Morgan Paul, an able young actor... can carry a starring part with ease."

Cinema Retro said "the entertaining film... is filled with solid direction and features fun performances by wonderful talent... a simple and engaging story, a catchy musical score by Raoul Kraushaar... and contains enough action and laughs to fill its brief 89 minute running time."

According to American International Pictures: A Filmography "This story of sex and small-town cops was paired on double bills with They Call Her One Eye and mainly played the big-city grindhouses and suburban drive-ins. As a matter of fact, since Dirty O'Neil deals with the amorous exploits of a cop in a town overflowing with attractive women, it seems the perfect film for people to watch at drive-ins, as they sit in their deck chairs and nurse their six-pack."

== See also ==
- List of American films of 1974
