= Summer School Teachers =

1974 film by Barbara Peeters

- Film poster by John Solie
- Directed by: Barbara Peeters
- Written by: Barbara Peeters
- Produced by: Julie Corman
- Starring: Candice Rialson
- Cinematography: Eric Saarinen
- Edited by: Barbara Pokras
- Music by: J.J. Jackson
- Distributed by: New World Pictures
- Release date: June 4, 1975
- Running time: 85 mins
- Country: United States
- Language: English
- Budget: $1.2 million or $250,000

Summer School Teachers is a 1974 feature film directed and written by Barbara Peeters and starring Candice Rialson. It is about three female friends who all teach at a school over the summer.

The film was an unofficial follow up to The Student Teachers (1973) which was in turn inspired by the success of "nurse" movies such as The Student Nurses (1970).

== Plot ==
Three friends from Iowa go to California for the summer, rent an apartment together, and teach at the same high school. PE teacher Conklin coaches an all-girl football team despite the opposition of the resident coach, and romances one of the male teachers. Sally teaches photography and despite being engaged to a man back home, has affairs with an eccentric rock star with a food fetish, and with a male chauvinist teacher who talks her into posing nude for some photos. Chemistry teacher Denise becomes involved with one of her students, a juvenile delinquent, who is falsely accused of participating in car stealing. Conklin finds out that funds for sport are being misspent by the coach. She and Sally are both suspended, but all ends happily with the all-girl football team triumphant.

== Cast ==
- Candice Rialson as Conklin
- Pat Anderson as Sally
- Rhonda Leigh Hopkins as Denise
- Will Carney as Jeremy
- Grainger Hines as Bob
- Christopher Barrett as Jeff
- Dick Miller as Sam
- Vince Barnett as Principal Adams
- Norman Bartold as Agwin
- Michael Greer as John John Lacey
- Barbara Pell as Janice
- Ka-Ron Sowell Brown as Jessie
- Merie Earle as Ethel
- Cecil Elliott as Freida
- John Kerry as Hiram

== Production ==
Barbara Peeters had worked for a number of years at New World Pictures in various capacities, notably second unit directing, and asked Roger Corman when she was going to get the chance to direct her own movie. Corman asked if she could write a "three girls" movie about teachers - a follow up to The Student Teachers - and Peeters agreed. She was from Iowa and made the film about teachers coming from Iowa.

Peeters said Corman felt the "three girl" formula worked for him. "It had the right amount of exploitation. You had three stories so you didn't have to get too deep on any of them and you could have three naked girls at some point in the movie and you had to have some action. It was the same formula and it had worked for him for a very long time."

At the time Peeters said she enjoyed working for Roger Corman:

He is always available and he doesn't hire you unless he trusts you. As long as you open big and close big and try to resolve three stories in the end, Roger lets you do what you want. Just be sure you put in either a sex scene or an action sequence every 15 minutes.

== Reception ==
Roger Corman attributed the film's popularity to its strong female liberation statement, which he thought was the strongest of any film made by New World Pictures.

=== Critical ===
The Los Angeles Times called it "an entertaining and breezy exploitation film... even though she operates on a very superficial level, screenwriter Peeters deals with real issues like the danger of labelling people or the trauma of teacher-student romance. As a director, Peeters excels in zany slapstick".

Diabolique magazine said the film was "feels like a screwball comedy rather than something sleazy. There is nudity... but the women are confident and in control: they do most of the seducing, they stick up for each other and the sisterhood, and the messages are mostly positive – girls should be able to do whatever boys can do, physical fitness is good, corruption is bad. This is the best character Rialson ever played."

== See also ==
- List of American films of 1974
