= Lewis Teague =

American film director (born 1938)

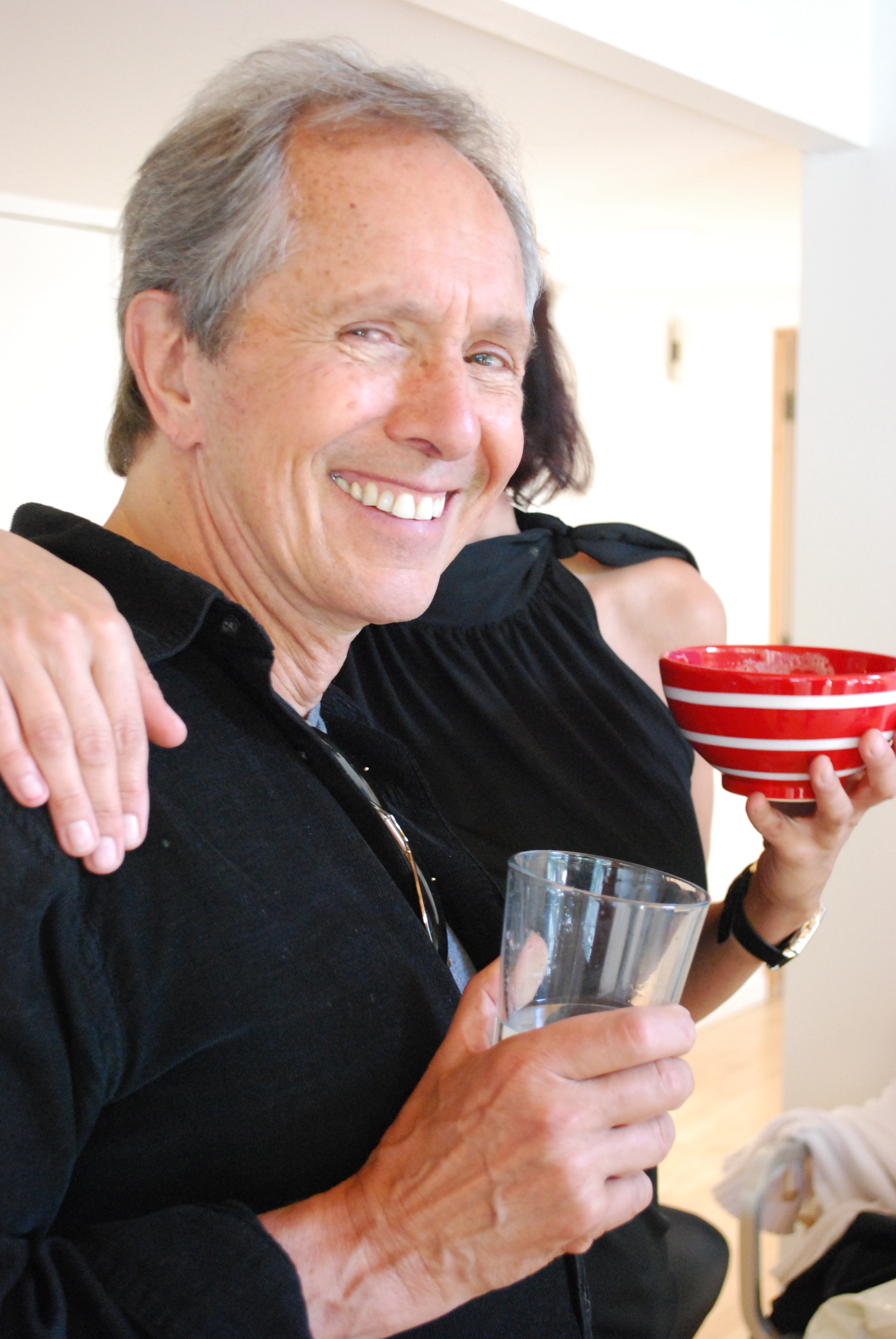
- Teague in 2009
- Born: March 8, 1938 (age 88); Brooklyn, New York, U.S.
- Occupations: Film and television director, film editor
- Years active: 1964–present

Lewis Teague (born March 8, 1938) is an American film director, whose work includes Alligator, Cat's Eye, Cujo, The Jewel of the Nile, The Dukes of Hazzard: Reunion!, Navy SEALs and Wedlock.

== Biography ==
=== Early life and career ===
Teague was born in Brooklyn, New York. Teague fell in love with films at age 14 when he saw The Steel Helmet (1951). He later said he "had every intention of becoming an artist, at least a comic book artist, if not a fine artist living in a garret in Greenwich Village when I grew up. But I got into trouble, got kicked out of high school, joined the Army, discovered German beer, stopped drawing and painting."

Teague dropped out of high school at age 17 and enrolled in the army, serving for three years in Germany. He studied at New York University, where he fell in love with filmmaking and realised that was what he wanted to do for a career. His short films included Sound and the Painter (1962) and It's About a Carpenter, which was circulated through public libraries. His influences were French filmmakers like Jean Luc Godard, Francois Truffaut and Jacques Rivette and his classmates included Jim McBride and Martin Scorsese. In 1963 Teague won a scholarship for being the most promising student at the school.

Teague left the school in 1963 without completing a degree when he was offered a job by Universal working on The Alfred Hitchcock Hour. (Teague returned to NYU to complete his degree in 2016, at the age of 78.) Teague apprenticed with Sydney Pollack and had an early directing credit with the episode "The Second Verdict" on The Alfred Hitchcock Hour (1964) starring Martin Landau. Teague then went to work with George Roy Hill assisting on Hawaii. He said "I sort of got separated from Universal in the process... so when I came back from Hawaii, my contacts at Universal said, you know, you haven't followed up on that original directing opportunity and so we are terminating your contract" adding "I was happy because that wasn't the kind of moviemaking that I was really interested in."

Teague later said he "discovered marijuana and dropped out" after watching The Beatles perform. He ran the Cinemateque 16, an underground movie theater in Los Angeles. It was owned by Robert Lippert, who Teague met through his friend Fred Roos. Teague recalled "this is the pre-porn era. And what it did, they just showed girls with big boobs dancing around and that kind of stuff. But when the hippies took over Sunset Strip, it was amazing." Teague said " it was a great opportunity for me to show some of my favorite films and it was also an opportunity for me to show films that were being made by young filmmakers who were experimenting."

Teague eventually "got bored, and returned to filmmaking." He provided a film segment for a theatre production of The Disenchanted (1968), which the Los Angeles Times described as "effective". His friend Don Devlin asked him to work as his associate on Loving (1970), a film Devlin had written and was producing. Teague worked as a production manager on the rock concert documentary Woodstock (1970) and was cinematographer on Bongo Wolf's Revenge (1970). He then worked in the film department of KCT directing documentaries. Teague made his debut as a feature director with Dirty O'Neil (1974), which he co-directed.

=== Roger Corman ===
In 1974, Teague was employed by Roger Corman at New World Pictures at the recommendation of Martin Scorsese who had also been to NYU. Corman asked Scorsese to edit Cockfighter (1974) but the director was unavailable and he recommended Teague.

Teague was second unit director and assistant editor on Death Race 2000 (1975); edited Crazy Mama (1975) for Jonathan Demme; assistant director on Thunder and Lightning (1977) (made for Corman but at 20th Century Fox); and was responsible for the avalanche sequence in Avalanche (1978). Teague later said, "The main things you learn by working for Corman are how to get every nickel on the screen, how to be as expedient as possible, and how to work very quickly. Also, Roger is an extremely clever person. Even though most of his material was exploitive, he always had a very intelligent approach. I learned a lot from the way he dealt with directors and editors. He was extremely well-organized, very insightful, very quick to make decisions."

Outside of New World he edited Summer Run (1974) and the Oscar-winning short documentary Number Our Days (1976).

=== Director ===
Teague said Corman had offered Teague the job of directing a John Sayles script, Battle Beyond the Stars, but that project was postponed (it was later made with another director). Corman then offered Teague another Sayles script, The Lady in Red (1979). He later said, "I was very lucky that that happened because it gave me a chance to do what I can do well, which is just sort of a gangster action film with really people in it and not have to deal with special effects and stuff."

Lady in Red starred Robert Conrad, who got Teague a job directing an episode of the TV series A Man Called Sloane. He also did episodes of Vega$ and Barnaby Jones and was the Second-Unit Director on Samuel Fuller's World War II movie, The Big Red One (1980).

Teague's second feature as sole credit was Alligator (1980). He persuaded the producer to allow the script to be rewritten by John Sayles. He did an episode of Riker then helmed the vigilante film Fighting Back (1982) for Dino de Laurentiis.

Teague was called in at the last minute to do a Stephen King adaptation, Cujo (1983), after original director Peter Medak left the project. Teague had been recommended by King, who admired Alligator. He said "I wanted to tell a good story about something meaningful, and I knew the success would depend on whether I could make it scary. I studied films that I found very scary or that I knew were very effective when they had been shown to an audience to extract whatever principles filmmakers used in those films to get their audiences to jump, and somehow make that work." Teague later said he regarded Cujo his best film.

Teague was going to direct the film of Clan of the Cave Bear from a script by Sayles but left the project after a dispute with the producers. He accepted an offer from De Laurentiis to make another King script, Cat's Eye (1985). Stephen King called Teague "the most unsung film director in America. You never hear his name brought up at parties...He has absolutely no shame and no moral sense. He just wants to go get ya, and I relate to that!" Teague, in turn, said of Sayles and King that "Both Stephen and John have wit, humor, and incredible imaginations. They're similar in a lot of ways- both prolific, intelligent people who don't care a great deal about material things."

Teague had his biggest budget to date with The Jewel of the Nile (1985), a sequel to Romancing the Stone (1984). Teague later reflect, "Up to that point, all the films that I did were personal films. I always had the liberty to change whatever I needed to change to make it more interesting or to make it work better. When I did The Jewel of the Nile, I just wanted to get on the A list of directors. I wanted it to be a commercial film and hadn't I been so eager to get on the A list, I would have been more playful, and I would have had more fun with it."

While editing The Jewel of the Nile, Teague turned down the script for Robocop. In a 2025 interview, Teague said: "When I read the original script, it seemed like it was a ripoff of Terminator. I thought, well, it's a genre film, and that's all I've been doing. I want to do something else. I really wanted something like a romantic comedy or some sort of existential human drama. Not another genre piece. So I turned it down."

Teague spent over a year developing a film for Orion that was not made, when de Laurentiis asked him to take over Collision Course (1989), after original director Bob Clark left. Star Jay Leno said "I like Lewis. He's a good action director and I trust his sense of humor." However the release of the film was delayed several years after De Laurentiis went bankrupt.

Teague returned to television with Shannon's Deal (1989), based on a script by Sayles. He then directed Navy Seals (1990), for Orion, replacing original director, Richard Marquand, who had died just before filming commenced. Producer Brenda Feigen said Orion recommended Teague as the studio had been developing another project with the director that did not go ahead. She had a difficult relationship with Teague and says he lost control of the film.

Teague said of Navy Seals, "I'm happy because I did a "yeoman's" job on it. It works, it cuts together, the action sequences are exciting, but it has nothing personal in it." Feigen claimed "Lewis had a hard time finding work after Navy Seals."

=== Later career ===
Teague directed two films for cable: Wedlock (1991) and T Bone N Weasel (1992).

He moved into episodic television, and directed episodes of Time Trax (the pilot), Fortune Hunter, Profiler, and Nash Bridges, and did some TV movies: OP Center (1995), Saved by the Light (1995),Justice League of America (1997) (doing uncredited work), The Dukes of Hazzard: Reunion! (1997), and The Triangle (2001).

After a five-year absence from directing, Teague directed (as well as wrote and produced) the dramatic short Cante Jondo (2007) shot on digital. "It was fun, and I learned a lot," he said. Then he made the webseries Charlotta TS (2010).He was Director of Photography and Co-Editor of the 2014 short, Clifford Goes Boom.

Teague summarised, "The job of a director on the set to a large degree is to keep everybody's morale up; he's one of the very few people on the set who doesn't have anything to do because he's overseeing it. He's not shooting it; he's not editing it, so a director needs to make sure that the cast and crew can do the best possible job."

== Appraisal ==
Writer Marcey Papandrea argued, "Teague is a bit of a mixed bag, but the man tries and it's evident that he does. If he has a weak script he certainly tries to overcome it and all of his work has a fun and entertaining factor to it. He's an 80's staple and his films from that time should be appreciated. It is a shame he didn't do more horror in these most recent years but regardless his mark has been left. He's a filmmaker I'd recommend seeking out."

== Filmography ==
Year	Title	Notes
1974	Dirty O'Neil	
1979	The Lady in Red	
1980	Alligator	
1982	Fighting Back	a.k.a. Death Vengeance
1983	Cujo	
1985	Cat's Eye	
1985	The Jewel of the Nile	
1989	Collision Course	
1990	Navy SEALs	
1991	Wedlock	
1992	T Bone N Weasel	
1995	Saved by the Light	
1997	The Dukes of Hazzard: Reunion!	
2001	Love and Treason	
2001	The Triangle	
