= Pat Anderson (actress) =

American actress

- Occupation: Actress
- Years active: 1972-
- Known for: Work in 1970s exploitation films
- Notable work: T.N.T. Jackson

Pat Anderson is an American actress best known for her work in 1970s exploitation films. She played Elaine, an undercover CIA agent who assists the title character in T.N.T. Jackson (1974). She has been called one of the best 70s starlets from New World Pictures.

== Select filmography ==
- 1973 Bonnie's Kids
- 1973 Fly Me
- 1974 Dirty O'Neil
- 1974 Newman's Law
- 1974 T.N.T. Jackson
- 1975 Summer School Teachers
- 1975 Cover Girl Models
- 1978 What Really Happened to the Class of '65? – episode "Mr Potential"
- 1984 Dynasty – episode
- 1983 Angel of H.E.A.T.
- 1983 September Gun – TV movie
- 1987 Jake and the Fatman - episode "Have Yourself a Merry Little Christmas"
- 2002 Reflections of Evil
