= Jim Gray (sportscaster) =

American sportscaster (born 1959)

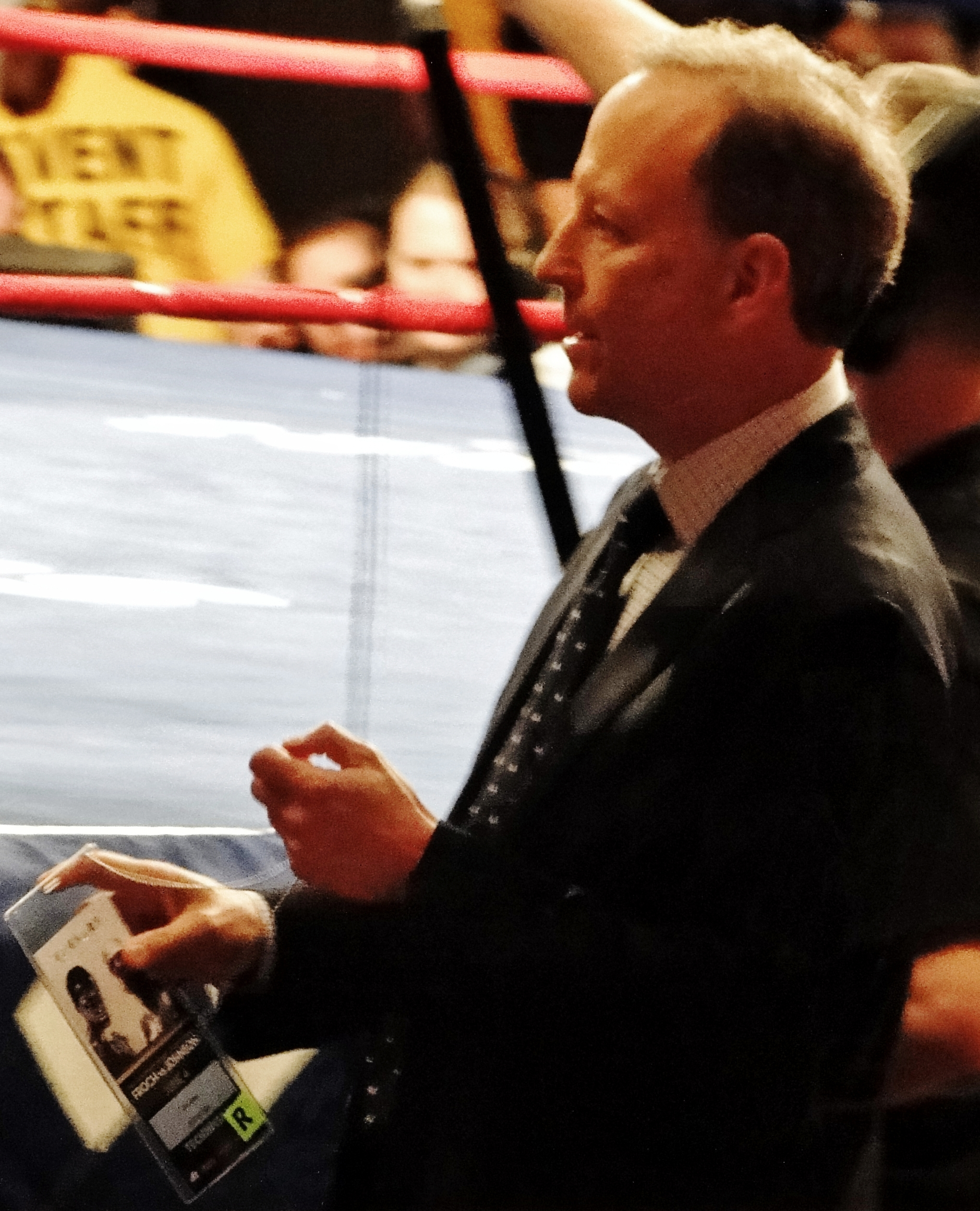
- Gray at the Boardwalk Hall in Atlantic City, New Jersey in 2011
- Born: November 11, 1959 (age 67); Denver, Colorado, U.S.
- Occupation: Sportscaster
- Known for: Sportscaster Interviewer, Journalist
- Parents: Gerald Gray (father); Lorna Gray (mother)

Jim Gray (born November 11, 1959) is an American sportscaster. As of 2021, he is with Showtime, Fox, and SiriusXM as a reporter, commentator, and interviewer, having served in the same capacity at ESPN, NBC Sports, and CBS Sports.

Gray is a journalist, reporter, producer, and executive producer of sports documentaries and features. He is the author of the best seller, "Talking to GOATs, The Moments You Remember and the Stories You Never Heard", and the host of the "Let's Go!" radio show and podcast on SiriusXM with Tom Brady and Larry Fitzgerald.

Gray has won 12 National Emmy Awards and has three times been named the Sports Reporter of the Year by the American Sportscasters Association (ASA). He was inducted with the class of 2018 into the International Boxing Hall of Fame, and with the class of 2020 in the Naismith Memorial Basketball Hall of Fame, with the prestigious Curt Gowdy Award.

== Career ==
Gray has worked on many major sporting events including the live network broadcast of numerous Super Bowls, World Series, NBA Finals, NCAA Final Fours, Olympics, The Masters, Orange Bowl, Cotton Bowl, MLB games, and NBA All-Star Games and more than 1200 World Boxing Championship title fights.

Gray has broken numerous sports stories and has scored exclusive interviews with Muhammad Ali, Michael Jordan, Tom Brady, Hank Aaron, Joe DiMaggio, Mike Tyson, LeBron James, Kobe Bryant, Tiger Woods, and many other athletes. Outside of sports, Gray has interviewed the last ten presidents of the United States, Nixon, Ford, Carter, Reagan, Bush, Clinton, G.W. Bush, Obama, Trump, and Biden. He has interviewed other world figures including South African President Nelson Mandela, Soviet President Mikhail Gorbachev, U.S. Secretaries of State Madeleine Albright, Condoleezza Rice, Hillary Clinton, John Kerry; the first man to walk on the Moon, Neil Armstrong; the last man on the Moon, Gene Cernan; and the first American to orbit Earth, John Glenn.

Gray started his career as a video tape editor and sports reporter in Denver at KBTV (now KUSA) the ABC affiliate (at the time), from 1977 to 1981. In 1981, Gray moved to Philadelphia, working for PRISM-TV broadcasting a sports studio show, and as a host and reporter for the 76ers and Phillies broadcasts until the end of 1983. During his time in Denver and Philadelphia, Gray also worked for ESPN as a freelance reporter beginning in 1979, then was hired as the networks only full-time reporter working in Los Angeles from 1984 to 1987.

Gray then moved to NBC Sports, where his assignments included NFL Live, the 1988 Olympics in Seoul, South Korea, and boxing. On The Dan Patrick Show in June 2025, he said that during this time he often stayed at John Madden's house. "I was like the guy who came for dinner and never left at The Dakota, (a Manhattan hotel)." His duties at NBC Sports expanded in 1994, working on the NFL, NBA, MLB, Notre Dame football, PGA golf, as an interviewer and reporter, also the 1996 Summer Olympics in Atlanta, the 2000 Summer Olympics in Sydney, 2008 Summer Olympics in Beijing, and 2012 Summer Olympics in London (radio).

From 1989 to 1994, Gray worked for CBS Sports as a reporter and interviewer for coverage of the NFL, NBA, NCAA, and Major League Baseball. He also worked on the NFL Today studio show, and the 1992 Winter Olympics in Albertville, and the 1994 Winter Olympics in Lillehammer. He began his career in boxing broadcasting for the closed circuit telecasts and satellite distribution for Top Rank and Kingvision, beginning in 1978, as a reporter and interviewer. He then covered the sport for ESPN SportsCenter and for CBS and NBC Sports. In 1992, Gray joined Showtime as the reporter for the Showtime Championship Boxing Series. In 1997, he won a National Emmy Award for individual achievement for his work on the Tyson–Holyfield fight.

In 2000, Gray became the live studio host for Monday Night Football on the Westwood One Radio network as well as for the Super Bowl, and the NCAA Final Four and National Championship. On Monday Night Football and the Super Bowl, Gray's studio partners for the pregame and halftime have been Mike Ditka (2001–2009), Phil Simms (2004–2008), Don Shula (2006–2009), Larry Fitzgerald (2008–2021), and Tom Brady (2009–2021). Gray has worked on the live radio broadcast coverage of The Masters for CBS Radio Sports and Westwood One Radio from 1989 to 2021.

In 2021, Gray, Brady, and Fitzgerald started a one-hour radio show and podcast for SiriusXM titled "Let's Go!", airing every Monday Night during the football season before NFL games. In 2003, Gray returned to ESPN to work on the NBA broadcasts and SportsCenter, as well as hosting a number of primetime interview specials. He was awarded the Sports Broadcaster of the Year in 1997 by the National Sportscasters and Sportswriters Association (NSSA).

Gray was awarded a star on the Hollywood Walk of Fame by the Los Angeles City Council and the Hollywood Chamber of Commerce in March 2005.

=== Notable events covered and athletes interviewed ===
In 1988, Gray was at the stadium and then the airport when Ben Johnson was disqualified for using steroids at the Seoul Olympics. His reporting in South Korea won an Emmy for Journalism. Gray was also on the air for the Showtime fight between Tyson and Evander Holyfield in 1997 in which Tyson bit off Holyfield's earlobe, interviewing the referee who disqualified Tyson, Mills Lane, and Tyson just moments after he bit Holyfield. The interview won him an Emmy. Gray also reported on the Olympic bombing from the 1996 Atlanta Olympics.

Gray was the reporter on the air for several major sports events including the Malice at the Palace. Later, Gray got an exclusive one-on-one interview with Ron Artest. On February 5, 2017, in Houston, Gray was the pregame, halftime, and postgame host, and live in game reporter for Super Bowl 51 on Westwood One Radio and interviewed President Donald Trump at halftime. On November 28, 2020, in Los Angeles Gray was the ringside reporter for the exhibition fight between Mike Tyson vs. Roy Jones Jr. It was Tyson's first boxing match in 15 years, with both combatants boxing each other while aged in their 50's. On February 7, 2021, Gray worked Super Bowl 55 in Tampa, Florida between the Bucs and the Kansas City Chiefs, marking the 24th time he has been on the live radio or television broadcast of the Super Bowl, more than any other broadcaster in Super Bowl history. At halftime he interviewed President Joe Biden.

Gray was the executive producer of the ESPN 30 for 30 documentary, "First Pitch", on President George W. Bush throwing the first pitch at Game 3 of the 2001 World Series at Yankee Stadium a few weeks after the September 11 terrorist attacks. The film was nominated for an Emmy. Gray has worked as a producer on the 1984 Olympic Games of Los Angeles on the Official Film, "16 Days of Glory", directed by Bud Greenspan. Gray has been a reporter and interviewer on the live television broadcast of the Olympic Games in 1988, 1992, 1994, 1996, 2000, 2008 and 2012 on the live radio broadcast as a commentator and interviewer.

== Notable interviews ==
Gray broke the news in a live interview on ESPN with Los Angeles Rams running back, and single season rushing record holder, Eric Dickerson, on being traded from the Rams to the Indianapolis Colts on October 31, 1987. The interview was hailed by ESPN anchor Tom Mees as, "The night ESPN SportsCenter truly arrived and was born. We have now gone from a highlight service and interviews to a legitimate news gathering and breaking news operation." On March 22, 1989, Gray got an exclusive, a television interview with NFL Commissioner Pete Rozelle in Palm Springs, California when Rozelle suddenly decided to retire.

On October 5, 1993, during Game 1 of the 1993 American League Championship Series between the Chicago White Sox and Toronto Blue Jays, Gray reported Chicago Bulls minority owner Eddie Einhorn told him Michael Jordan would retire from the Chicago Bulls the next day. Jordan was in attendance at the game with Einhorn. Gray followed Jordan out of the stadium to the parking lot with a camera crew and Jordan acknowledging and confirming to Gray what Einhorn told him was true and that Jordan would retire.

During Game 4 of the 1996 NBA Eastern Conference Finals, Gray interviewed Leonard Armato, Shaquille O'Neal's agent, while the game was going on with questions about the future of Shaquille O'Neal and then head coach Brian Hill. After a series of tough questions, Gray ended the interview by saying to Armato, "Try to enjoy the game now that you've been grilled!" The interview served as a platform for O'Neal and set the stage as a month later O'Neal left the Magic and signed with the Lakers.

During the 1997 NBA Finals, Gray interviewed Dennis Rodman during an NBA on NBC segment. After repeatedly questioning Rodman about his comments about the Mormon religion when (the Chicago Bulls were in Salt Lake City to play the Jazz during the Finals), Rodman finally had enough of the questions, walked off the interview set with tears in his eyes and removed the microphone without assistance. NBC showed the ending of the interview as it happened during the NBA Finals pre-game show. On June 24, 2000, in Glasgow, Scotland, Gray interviewed Mike Tyson after his swift knockout of Lou Savarese where Tyson proclaimed he "wanted to eat his (Lennox Lewis') children."

Gray has been known for his close relationship with Kobe Bryant, which showed in the immediate aftermath of Bryant's sexual assault case (the night when the news broke, Gray appeared on SportsCenter in defense of Bryant's character) and in several sideline interviews. It was Gray whom Bryant called to vent about teammate Shaquille O'Neal in October of that year (a phone call that started one of O'Neal and Bryant's worst disagreements). Gray's interviews with maligned baseball player Barry Bonds in 2006 and 2007 were the only one-on-one interviews Bonds granted after breaking both Babe Ruth's and Hank Aaron's home run records. In both interviews, he denied using steroids or other performance-enhancing drugs.

On July 8, 2010, Gray interviewed LeBron James when he revealed his 2010 decision to sign with the Miami Heat as a free agent on a live ESPN special called The Decision. On May 7, 2015, Gray interviewed New England Patriots quarterback and 4 time Super Bowl champion Tom Brady at Salem State University in Salem, Massachusetts regarding Brady's involvement and the Patriots role in Deflategate. It was the same day the NFL announced the results of the Wells Report. It is the only one-on-one interview that Brady has done on the subject.

On August 27, 2017, Gray interviewed Floyd Mayweather in the ring after his victory against Conor McGregor at which time Mayweather officially retired from boxing with a record of 50–0. Mayweather joined other boxing legends and champions Larry Holmes (April 1995) and Mike Tyson (June 2005) by announcing their retirements from boxing while in the ring during questioning by Gray. On April 30, 2018, Gray interviewed Brady in Los Angeles. In response to a question whether if the Patriots had the appropriate gratitude for his achievements, Brady replied, "I plead the fifth.”

The most notable interview of Gray's sportscasting career occurred with former baseball player Pete Rose. During Game 2 of the 1999 World Series, Rose was introduced as a member of the Major League Baseball All-Century Team. After the ceremony, Gray (who was covering the series for NBC) asked Rose about the Dowd Report's allegations that he had gambled on major league baseball games, which he repeatedly denied:

Jim Gray: Pete, let me ask you now. It seems as though there is an opening, the American public is very forgiving. Are you willing to show contrition, admit that you bet on baseball and make some sort of apology to that effect?

Pete Rose: Not at all, Jim. I'm not going to admit to something that didn't happen. I know you're getting tired of hearing me say that. But I appreciate the ovation. I appreciate the American fans voting me on the All-Century Team. I'm just a small part of a big deal tonight.

Gray: With the overwhelming evidence in that report, why not make that step...

Rose: No. This is too much of a festive night to worry about that because I don't know what evidence you're talking about. I mean, show it to me...

Gray: Well, the Dowd Report says- but we don't want to debate that, Pete.

Rose: Well, why not? Why do we want to believe everything he says?

Gray: You signed a paper acknowledging the ban. Why did you sign it if you didn't agree with it?

Rose: It also says I can apply for reinstatement after one year, if you remember correctly. In the press conference, as a matter of fact, my statement was "I can't wait for my little girl to be a year old so I can apply for reinstatement". At my press conference. So you forgot to add that clause that was in there.

Gray: Well, you have reapplied. ... You've applied for reinstatement in 1997. Have you heard back from Commissioner Selig?

Rose: No, and that kind of surprises me. It's only been two years, though, and he's got a lot of things on his mind. But I hope to some day.

Gray: Pete, it's been 10 years since you've been allowed on the field. Obviously, the approach that you have taken has not worked. Why not, at this point, take a different approach?

Rose: Well, when you say it hadn't worked, what do you exactly mean?

Gray: You're not allowed in baseball. You're not allowed to earn a living in the game you love. And you're not allowed to be in the Hall of Fame.

Rose: Well, I took that approach and that was to apply for reinstatement. I hope Bud Selig considers that and gives me an opportunity. I won't need a third chance. All I need is a second chance.

Gray: Pete, those who will hear this tonight will say you have been your own worst enemy and continue to be. How do you respond to that?

Rose: In what way are you talking about?

Gray: By not acknowledging what seems to be overwhelming evidence.

Rose: Yeah, I'm surprised you're bombarding me like this. I mean I'm doing an interview with you on a great night, a great occasion, a great ovation. Everybody seems to be in a good mood. And you're bringing up something that happened 10 years ago.

Gray: I'm bringing it up because I think people would like to see ... Pete, we've got to go, we've got a game.

Rose: This is a prosecutor's brief, not an interview, and I'm very surprised at you. I am, really.

Gray: Some would be surprised that you didn't take the opportunity.

After conducting the interview, Gray offered no apology for his line of questioning toward Rose:

I stand by it, and I think it was absolutely a proper line of questioning. . . I don't have an agenda against Pete Rose . . . Pete was the one who started asking me questions. I definitely wouldn't have gone (that) direction if he had backed off. My intent was to give Pete an opportunity to address issues that have kept him out of baseball. I thought he might have had a change of heart. . . . He hadn't had an opening in 10 years. . . . If I had let that go, all of you (reporters) would have had me on here today for a totally different reason.

However, after the fallout of heavy criticism toward him & NBC that ensued from the interview, Gray offered the following apology on-air prior to the start of Game 3:

(I) thought it was important to ask Pete Rose if this was the right moment for him to make an apology. If in doing so the interview went on too long and took some of the joy of the occasion, then I want to say to baseball fans everywhere that I am very sorry about this.

Despite Gray's pre-game apology, New York Yankees outfielder Chad Curtis snubbed Gray's request for an on-field interview with him right after hitting the game-winning walk-off home run:

Jim Gray: Tell us about that pitch.

Chad Curtis: I can't do it. As a team, we kind of decided, because of what happened with Pete, we're not going to talk out here on the field.

Curtis claimed it was a team decision not to speak with Gray, but Yankee manager Joe Torre later suggested that Curtis had acted independently. On January 8, 2004, more than four years after the interview, Rose's autobiography My Prison Without Bars was published. In the book, Rose finally admitted publicly to betting on baseball games.

== Personal life ==
Jim Gray is married to his wife, Frann and they have no children.
