= Rick Hill (actor) =

American actor (born 1953)

No. 24
- Positions: Fullback, tailback

Personal information
- Born: January 26, 1953 (age 73); Harlan, Kentucky
- Listed height: 6 ft 1 in (1.85 m)
- Listed weight: 206 lb (93 kg)

Career information
- High school: Perrysburg (OH)
- College: Georgia Tech (1971–1975)

Richard Hill (born January 26, 1953) is an American actor, author, and former American football player. He is perhaps best known for his appearances in several films from veteran producer Roger Corman, including playing the title role in two installments of his Deathstalker series. He is also a published writer of non-fiction, having collaborated with controversial baseball figure Pete Rose on a 2004 tell-all book.

== Football career ==
Hill was a three-sport letterman for Perrysburg High in Perrysburg, Ohio. In football, he twice won MVP honors in the Northern Lakes League, and was also a league all-star in basketball. He was recruited by the Georgia Tech football program, but his career was plagued by injuries.

Before 1972, NCAA players were required to spend a year on a freshman team before graduating to the varsity team. Despite a slow start which he attributed to an ankle sprain, Hill led the so-called "Baby Jackets" in ground gains, in part because future College Hall of Famer Randy Rhino was moved to defense. Hill's second year started slow again on a weak team, and he was redshirted partway into the season, although head coach Bill Fulcher called him "probably as good a back as we have at Tech".

Hill came out strong in the 1973–74 campaign and led the team with six touchdowns by early November, when he suffered a ligament tear that took him out of action for the rest of the schedule. Unsure if he would even be able to play until late into the pre-season, Hill took the field for the 1974–75 campaign but was quickly sidelined with a hamstring injury. He recovered and helped a rejuvenated Tech offense to several school records in the final stretch.

Hill was a Rhodes Scholarship nominee at Georgia Tech, from where he graduated in 1975 with a major in business. Thereafter, he briefly enrolled at Emory University to study law, before attempting to turn pro. Hill trained with the Detroit Lions of the NFL, but did not make the team. He signed a contract with the Winnipeg Blue Bombers of the CFL in the spring of 1976, but suffered a dislocated shoulder during the preseason and left training camp with no appearance on record in the regular season.

== Film career ==
Hill's acting break came when he was scouted at a Los Angeles beach and offered the small part of a lifeguard in a production called One of a Kind. The same setting begat a leading role in Beach Patrol, the 1979 pilot for a proposed Aaron Spelling series, although the show was not picked up. Hill was able to capitalize on his athletic background to keep his career going: he played a college football star (albeit from Michigan) in Detour to Terror, an NBC telefilm starring and produced by O.J. Simpson, and had a recurring role as another football player on the daytime drama Days of Our Lives. He also guest-starred as a varsity football player on an episode of Charlie's Angels, another Spelling production. In 1981, he was cast in Today's FBI, a re-imagining of classic show The FBI, which ran for a single season on ABC. In the later stages of his career, Hill has occasionally worked as a director of episodic television.

In 1983, Hill made his theatrical debut in Deathstalker, which was part of a wave of heroic fantasy films that followed Conan The Barbarian in its wake. The film was profitable for Roger Corman's New World Pictures, and Hill subsequently starred in several action films for Corman (including the third Deathstalker sequel) and his associate Cirio Santiago. Hill also appeared in Warrior Queen, a film aping the Deathstalker template but made by another exploitation producer, Harry Alan Towers. In 1994, he played a secondary protagonist in the final installment of the Class of... series, Class of 1999 II. Around the same time, the actor made another push for a leading role with Immortal Soldier, an android film which he co-wrote and was to feature genre veterans Maria Conchita Alonso, Jeff Wincott, Robert Davi, Michael Ironside and Louise Fletcher. However the project, promoted by upstart Hatch Entertainment, did not materialize.

In the 1980s, Hill was a member of the Hollywood All-Stars, a touring celebrity softball team raising money for various charitable causes.

== Writing career ==
Early in his entertainment career, Hill expressed an interest in writing, and was working on a spec script based on his college recruiting experience. A baseball fan, he wrote another about the life of Jim Eisenreich, who battled through Tourette syndrome to become a Major League player. After that one was optioned, his agent tried to pitch him as a writer for a planned biopic of Pete Rose, a fellow Ohioan with whom Hill had become acquainted at a 1986 celebrity softball game. While neither film projects panned out, Rose read the Eisenreich script and chose Hill to write a book about his life. In the resulting opus, My Prison Without Bars, Rose admitted to betting on MLB games for the first time, an accusation he had steadfastly denied before.

In 2023, Hill published another biography, dedicated to humanitarian doctor and fellow Georgia Tech graduate G.B. Espy. Hill met Espy during a public speaking engagement, and the idea of the book was suggested to him by former Tech basketball player Roger Kaiser, an admirer of the doctor's career.

== Selected filmography ==
Note: This Rick Hill is not to be confused with several homonyms, including an Australian actor and a kickboxer who appeared in Bloodfist II for his frequent employer Roger Corman.

=== Film ===
Year	Title	Role	Notes
1983	Deathstalker	Deathstalker	
1986	The Devastator	Deacon Porter	Also known as The Destroyers
1987	Warrior Queen	Marcus	
1988	Fast Gun	Jack Steiger	
1990	Mark of the Beast	Dan Allen	
1991	Dune Warriors	John	
1991	Deathstalker IV: Match of Titans	Deathstalker	
1991	Eye of the Widow	Chris Jones	
1994	Class of 1999 II: The Substitute	G.D. Ash	
1997	Inferno	Trevor	Also known as Operation Cobra
1998	Storm Trooper	Denton	

=== Television ===
Year	Title	Role	Notes
1978	ABC Afterschool Specials	Lifeguard	Episode: "One of a Kind"
1979	Beach Patrol	Earl "Hack" Hackman	TV movie
1979	Charlie's Angels	Steve Fitzpatrick	Episode: "Angels on Campus"
1979	Steeletown	Coach Barnes	TV movie
1980	Eight is Enough	Scoutmaster Harvey	2 episodes
1980	Days of Our Lives	Kyle McCullough	24 episodes
1980	Detour to Terror	Kurt	TV movie
1980	Where the Ladies Go	Steve	TV movie
1981	Today's F.B.I.	Al Gordean	19 episodes
1982	Magnum, P.I.	Lee Chambers	Episode: "The Eighth Part of the Village"
1981 1983	The Dukes of Hazzard	Matt Mallory / Phil Ackley	2 episodes
1983	Cheers	Tibor Svetkovic	Episode: "Now Pitching, Sam Malone"
1984	The Master	Ron Gordon	Episode: "Kunoichi"
1988	Matlock	Vince Campbell	Episode: "The Body"
1991	The New Adam-12	Bomb Squad Officer	Episode: "Playing with Fire"
1993	Raven	Al Striker	Episode: "Poisoned Harvest"
1998	Mowgli: The New Adventures of the Jungle Book	Russell	Episode: "What Goes Around..."
1998	Born Free	—N/a	Director; 5 episodes
1998	Hollywood Safari	—N/a	Director; Episode: "War Games"
2002	TVography	—N/a	Director and producer Episode: "Lee Majors, Hollywood's Bionic Hero"
