= Deathstalker IV: Match of Titans =

1991 film by Howard R. Cohen

- Release art by Boris Vallejo
- Directed by: Howard R. Cohen
- Written by: Howard R. Cohen
- Produced by: Howard R. Cohen; Roger Corman; Steven Rabiner
- Starring: Rick Hill; Maria Ford; Brett Baxter Clark; Michelle Moffett; Anya Pencheva
- Cinematography: Emil Vagenshtain
- Edited by: Nancy Senoff; Nadia Tsenova
- Music by: Simo Lazarov
- Production company: New Concorde
- Distributed by: New Horizons Home Video
- Release date: January 20, 1992 (U.S.)
- Running time: 85 minutes
- Countries: United States; Bulgaria
- Language: English

Deathstalker IV: Match of Titans, is a 1991 American-Bulgarian sword and sorcery fantasy film written and directed by Howard R. Cohen and starring Rick Hill, Maria Ford and Brett Baxter Clark. A sequel to Deathstalker and the Warriors from Hell (1988) and it is the fourth installment in the Deathstalker film series. Hill, the first actor to portray the character, returns to the franchise, and in turn the film goes back to a more serious tone after two comedic installments. The U.S. box cover uses the slightly different title of Deathstalker IV: Match of the Titans.

== Plot ==
Deathstalker takes part in a contest of strength—a challenge to lure competitors into the main arena of Queen Kana's castle. Mysteriously, combatants disappear from the castle one by one. Deathstalker acts to defend his fellow warriors, his life and his newfound love against an army of Stone Warriors and the Queen.

== Cast ==
- Rick Hill as Deathstalker
- Maria Ford as Dionara
- Brett Baxter Clark as Vaniat
- Michelle Moffett as Queen Kana
- Anya Pencheva as Janeris
- Đoko Rosić as Rakshia (credited as Jocko Rossitch)
- Kosta Karageorgiev as Palon
- Jenny Philipova as Tarinda
- Rumen Dimitrov as Eldoron
- Mihaela Staikova as Lesia
- Tanya Dimitrova as Liala (credited as Tania Dimitrova)
- Sirma Nicolova as Tisia
- Endrika Shehpazian as Terina
- Velico Stomanov as Malikat
- Stancho Stanchev as Aldilar
- Darina Georgieva as Adria

== Production ==
=== Development ===
Deathstalker IV was the first American co-production shot in Bulgaria following the fall of the Communist regime. The film was commissioned by Roger Corman's Concorde Pictures, and production services were provided by Balkan Film Enterprise, a British corporation recently established to lure foreign producers to the country, with a 45 percent participation from the Bulgarian government. Several sources indicate that BFE was part of controversial medial mogul Robert Maxwell's empire. It was originally announced that filming would start on June 25, 1990, as part of a two-picture slate bookended by Barbarian Queen III, but the latter did not happen.

=== Filming ===
Photography took place between June 14 and August 17, 1990. Boyana Feature Film Studios in Sofia provided soundstages, while location filming took place in the Belogradchik Rocks area in the Northwest of the country. The exterior of Queen Kana's castle was represented by Baba Vida Fortress in Vidin. The film re-used some props from Khan Asparuh, a 1981 historical epic directed by local co-producer Ludmil Staikov. Bulgarian star Anya Pencheva was excited to be part of the milestone production, which remains a positive memory. Wanting to impress the American crew, she hurt her back in the mud and was nursed back to health by her co-star Đoko Rosić Several other action scenes were recycled from previous installments, a common practice of producer Roger Corman.

== Release ==
=== Theatrical ===
Deathstalker IV: Match of Titans received theatrical exposure in some international markets such as Japan, where it premiered ahead of the U.S. on July 13, 1991, through Nippon Herald Films.

=== Home media ===
The film was released on U.S. VHS by New Horizons Home Video on January 29, 1992. In the U.K., the film's rental tape debuted on September 24, 1991, while the retail version only arrived one year later. Some sources show a Bulgarian VHS of the film credited to distributor Video ADI, although it sports a bootleg cover design lifted from the British version.

The movie was re-issued on U.S. DVD by New Concorde on August 27, 2002.

== Reception ==
=== Critical response ===
Deathstalker IV: Match of Titans has received mostly negative reviews. Sister publications TV Guide and The Motion Picture Guide dubbed it "a 90-pound weakling among gladiator films", which plays out like "a series of 'You started it' playground fights" marred by "canned muzak reminiscent of your local shopping mall. [...] Still, its unpretentiousness, its ludicrous anachronisms and its tongue-and-cheek dialogue (however poorly delivered) give it some muscle in the action adventure arena." Mick Martin and Masha Porter's Video Movie Guide lambasted an "[u]nbelievably bad sword-and-sorcery flick" where "[a]cting is nonexistent and fight scenes are poorly staged." Similarly, Mark Kermode of Sight and Sound found that "exploitation doesn't come any duller."

The Blockbuster Entertainment Guide to Movies and Videos assessed that it "[l]acks the charm of the previous films in this series." James O'Neill, author of the book Sci-Fi on Tape, also called it "[t]he last, thus far, and certainly least of the series, but at least it doesn't take itself too seriously." P.J. Thorndyke, author the book Barbarians at the Gates of Hollywood, disagreed and deemed it "arguably the most polished in the series". Deathstalker remake director Steven Kostanski also counts himself among the film's apologists.
