= Akin Gump Strauss Hauer & Feld =

International law firm

Akin Gump Strauss Hauer & Feld LLP
- Headquarters: Washington, D.C., U.S.
- No. of offices: 18 worldwide
- No. of attorneys: 1,000+
- No. of employees: 1,800+
- Major practice areas: General practice
- Key people: Abid Qureshi & Daniel Walsh (Co-Chairs)
- Revenue: $1.22 billion (2021)
- Profit per equity partner: $3.093 million (2021)
- Date founded: 1945
- Founder: Robert Strauss and Richard Gump
- Company type: Limited liability partnership
- Website: akingump.com

Akin Gump Strauss Hauer & Feld LLP (known as Akin Gump or Akin) is an American multinational law firm headquartered in Washington, D.C. In 2024 it was the second-largest lobbying firm in the United States by revenue.

== History ==
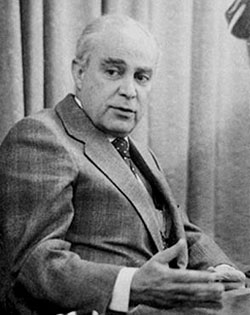
Robert Schwarz Strauss, the firm's founder

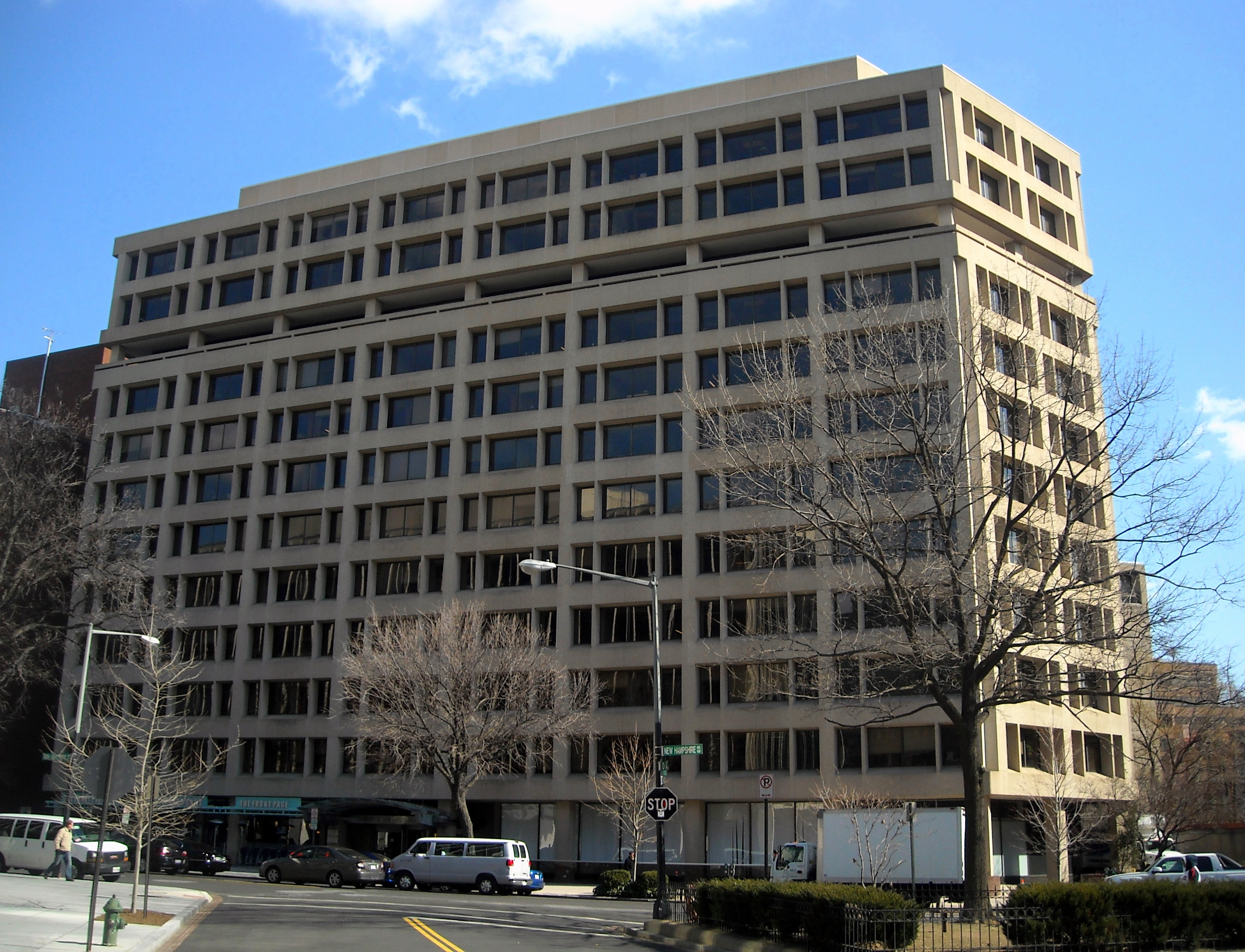
The firm's former office in Washington, D.C.

The firm was founded in Dallas, Texas, in 1945 by Robert Strauss and Richard Gump. It maintains a large presence in Texas with five offices in the state.

In early September 1950, Strauss and Gump added Irving Goldberg and William P. Fonville to the firm, which was then renamed Goldberg, Fonville, Gump & Strauss.

In 1963, Jack Hauer left a competitor to join the firm, which became known as Goldberg, Fonville, Gump, Strauss & Hauer.

Goldberg left the firm in 1966 to accept a federal judgeship on the United States Court of Appeals for the Fifth Circuit. He was replaced by Henry Akin. Fonville's departure—and the ascent to named partner status of Alan Feld, who had joined the firm in 1960—gave the firm the name it currently bears.

In 2012, the firm's partnership elected Kim Koopersmith to serve as its chairperson, joining the few women up to that time to head an Am Law 50 law firm. She succeeded R. Bruce McLean, who had helmed the firm for 20 years and is the first woman to chair the firm.

In 2013, Akin adopted a "single tier" partnership structure, in which all partners have equity, abandoning the more popular "two tier" structure in which many partners have no equity interest.

In 2017, Akin hired its first chief diversity and inclusion officer, Michele Meyer-Shipp, who joined the firm from Prudential Financial. She was succeeded by Nimesh Patel, who joined the firm in February 2019.

According to OpenSecrets, Akin was one of the top law firms contributing to federal candidates during the 2012 election cycle, donating $2.56 million, 66% to Democrats. By comparison, during that same period Kirkland & Ellis donated $2.49 million, 59% to Republicans, while oil conglomerate ExxonMobil donated $2.66 million, 88% to Republicans. Since 1990, Akin has contributed $19.84 million to federal candidates, and since 2003 has spent $8 million on lobbying.

The firm's clients includes the governments of Hong Kong, Japan, South Korea, the Maldives, and Nicaragua.

The firm has offices in Dallas, Washington, D.C., San Antonio, Houston, Irvine, Fort Worth, New York, Moscow, Philadelphia, London, Los Angeles, San Francisco, Beijing, Hong Kong, Singapore, Abu Dhabi, Dubai, Frankfurt, Geneva and Hartford. In December 2023, Akin announced the decision to begin winding down operations in Beijing in 2024.

In November 2023, Akin Gump Strauss Hauer & Feld was among a group of major law firms who sent a letter to the deans of several top U.S. law schools following an alleged rise of antisemitism on campuses following the start of the Gaza war. The letter said "We look to you to ensure your students who hope to join our firms after graduation are prepared to be an active part of workplace communities that have zero tolerance policies for any form of discrimination or harassment, much less the kind that has been taking place on some law school campuses."

=== Involvement in Russia investigation ===
During the 2017 Special Counsel investigation regarding Russian interference in the 2016 United States elections, Melissa Laurenza, a partner of the firm, was called to testify in Paul Manafort's trial. Laurenza had previously been Manafort's lawyer, and had reportedly helped him submit forms in which he registered as a foreign agent. In October 2017, the United States Office of Special Counsel compelled Laurenza to testify in the case; "New York University law professor Stephen Gillers said the judge was persuaded that there was significant evidence Manafort and [Rick Gates] had duped their lawyer into sending inaccurate letters to Justice about their lobbying efforts and about what emails might exist about the work."

=== Involvement in U.S. presidential impeachment inquiry ===
In 2019, lawyers from the firm represented Catherine Croft, a U.S. State Department specialist on Ukraine in her testimony before the Select Committee on Intelligence in the U.S. House of Representatives.

== Recognition ==
In 2020, for the sixth time in seven years, the firm was named to the A-List by The American Lawyer in its annual ranking of the country's 20 leading law firms. In 2017, the firm marked its 15th appearance on Corporate Board Member's list of the nation's top 20 corporate law firms. In 2019, for the 11th year out of the last 12, Akin was named to The National Law Journal's "Appellate Hot List" of firms that "[won] big in federal and state appeals courts across the country".

Yale Law Women, the largest student organization at Yale Law School, named Akin to its 2019 list of Top 10 Firms for Family Friendliness and, in 2020, as one of only three law firms to its list of Top Firms for Working Mothers and Family Planning. In October 2017, the Minority Corporate Counsel Association presented Akin with the Thomas L. Sager Award in recognition of the firm's "sustained commitment to improving the hiring, retention and promotion of diverse attorneys". (The firm won the award four times previously.) In 2019, for the 12th year in a row, Akin received a perfect score on the Human Rights Campaign's Corporate Equality Index, which rates employers on their treatment of gay, lesbian, bisexual and transgender employees, consumers and investors.

Chambers & Partners ranks the firm as top tier in 11 areas of practice around the globe including in bankruptcy/restructuring/insolvency, capital markets: debt, government relations, healthcare and Native American law.

== Notable people ==
=== Current employees and consultants ===
- Lincoln P. Bloomfield Jr., former Assistant Secretary of State for Political-Military Affairs
- Al From, founder and former CEO of the Democratic Leadership Council
- Ileana Ros-Lehtinen, former U.S. Representative from Florida
- Lamar Smith, former U.S. Representative from Texas
- John E. Sununu, former U.S. Senator from New Hampshire
- Tommy Thompson, former governor of Wisconsin and U.S. Secretary of Health and Human Services
- Filemon Vela, Jr., former U.S. Representative from Texas
- Joe Donnelly, former U.S. Senator from Indiana

=== Alumni ===
- Matthew Berry, General Counsel to the House of Representatives
- George P. Bush, Commissioner of the Texas General Land Office
- Joaquín Castro, U.S. Representative, Texas' 20th Congressional District
- Julián Castro, former San Antonio mayor, former U.S. Secretary of Housing and Urban Development, candidate for 2020 Democratic presidential nomination
- Alan D. Cohn, former Assistant Secretary for Strategy, Planning, Analysis & Risk of the United States Department of Homeland Security
- Eliot Cutler, political candidate and convicted felon
- Antonio Delgado, Lieutenant Governor of New York
- John M. Dowd, former U.S. Attorney, wrote Dowd Report and legal advisor to President Donald Trump
- Victor H. Fazio, former U.S. Representative from California
- Ben Fountain, award-winning fiction writer
- Savannah Guthrie, co-anchor, The Today Show
- Kay Hagan, former U.S. Senator from North Carolina
- John P. Howard III, judge, District of Columbia Court of Appeals
- Vernon Jordan Jr., former adviser to President Bill Clinton
- Ken Mehlman, former chair, Republican National Committee
- Patricia Millett, judge, U.S. Court of Appeals for the District of Columbia Circuit
- Bill Paxon, former U.S. Representative from New York
- Michele A. Roberts, executive director, National Basketball Players Association
- Devin Stone, founder, LegalEagle
- Todd Wagner, co-founder of Broadcast.com, and businessman
- Stanley Woodward, lawyer

== See also ==
- List of largest United States-based law firms by profits per partner
