= John M. Dowd =

American lawyer (born 1941)

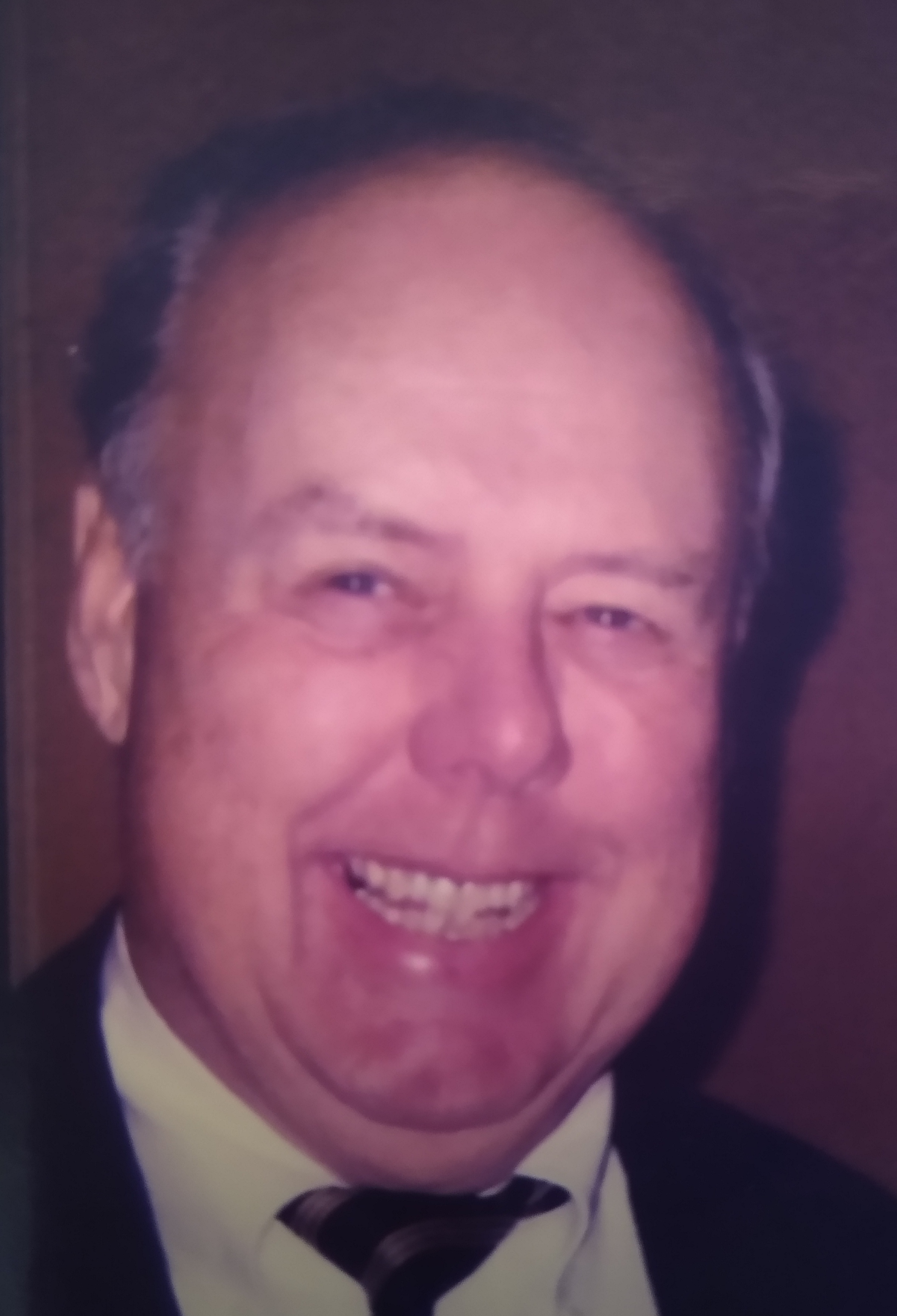
- Born: John Maguire Dowd; November 2, 1941 (age 85); Brockton, Massachusetts, U.S.
- Education: St. Bernard College, Alabama (BA); Emory University (JD)
- Occupation: Attorney
- Known for: Dowd Report
- Military career
- Allegiance: United States
- Branch: United States Marine Corps
- Rank: Captain

John Maguire Dowd (born November 2, 1941) is an American attorney, former attorney for the United States Department of Justice, and former Marine Corps Judge Advocate. Dowd was employed by several law firms in the Washington, D.C. area for his expertise in defending clients accused of white-collar crimes. He was appointed by Major League Baseball (MLB) to lead the special counsel in multiple investigations with the organization in the 1980s and 1990s involving sports betting and bribery, the most notable investigation being the Dowd Report in 1989, which resulted in Pete Rose being banned from baseball for life.

From June 2017 to March 2018, Dowd was a legal advisor to President Donald Trump. On March 22, 2018, Dowd resigned as Trump's lead counsel in the special counsel investigation into Russian election interference and possible ties to Trump associates.

== Early life ==
Dowd was born in Brockton, Massachusetts, to parents Mary and Paul Dowd. As a boy, he became fascinated with the writings of attorney Clarence Darrow. During the summers, Dowd worked at Sankaty Head Golf Club on Nantucket Island where he became acquainted with trial attorney Edward Bennett Williams. Dowd received his B.A. cum laude from then St. Bernard College in 1963 and J.D. from Emory University School of Law in 1965. From 1965 to 1969, Dowd served in the Judge Advocate Division and was promoted to the rank of captain.

== Department of Justice ==
Dowd joined the Department of Justice in 1969. Working for the Department of Justice, Dowd was a trial attorney for the tax division and later as a chief of an Organized Crime Strike Force from 1974 to 1978. His early career at the Department of Justice involved working on the tax evasion case of mobster Meyer Lansky, the prosecution of Small Business Administration bribery cases in Virginia, and internal investigations involving financial corruption by Federal Bureau of Investigation (FBI) officials. One internal investigation of FBI officials in particular dealt with former FBI Director J. Edgar Hoover that began in 1976, four years after his death. Dowd stated in a 1993 interview on Frontline that the investigation revealed, "Hoover had taken, at taxpayers' expense, goods and services provided by employees of the FBI."

Dowd also helped implement and trained FBI officers and U.S. Attorneys' offices the Racketeer Influenced and Corrupt Organizations Act (RICO). The first case that tested the strength of the RICO laws was tried by Dowd.

In 1977 and 1978, Dowd led an investigation of Pennsylvanian Congressman Daniel J. Flood. Dowd questioned Flood's former aide, Steve Elko, who accused Flood on a number of federal contracts in exchange for cash kickbacks and also mentioned Pennsylvanian Congressman Joshua Eilberg's law firm handling the contract negotiations for a federal grant to Hahnemann University Hospital. The discovery of evidence involving Congressman Eilberg coincided with the firing of U.S. Attorney, David W. Marston. Dowd was then assigned to investigate Eilberg while the Flood investigation later expanded to include RICO violations.

Dowd was considered a candidate to be a U.S. Attorney for the eastern district of Virginia in 1978, but he was never appointed by President Jimmy Carter.

In April 1979, The Wall Street Journal reporter Jim Drinkhall, wrote an article accusing federal prosecutors Dowd and William M. Kramer of developing and implementing an unethical plan to force a convicted felon, Samuel Ray Calabrese, to cooperate with the government against other organized crime figures. Following its publication, the Department of Justice launched an investigation that ultimately cleared Dowd and Kramer of wrongdoing. Drinkhall later published a second article in December 1979 where he accused Dowd and Kramer of investigating him. Dowd and Kramer filed a libel suit against Dow Jones for $5 million and it was settled for $800,000 in 1984 before going to trial.

== Legal career ==
Following his departure from the Department of Justice in 1978, Dowd was hired by the law firm Whitman & Ransom as a partner in their Washington, D.C. office to represent defendants accused of white-collar crimes. He exited Whitman & Ransom to join Heron, Burchette, Ruckert & Rothwell in 1984. Dowd left Heron Burchette in 1990 and joined Akin Gump Strauss Hauer & Feld where he later became a partner. Dowd has set up his own practice, John M. Dowd, in Washington, D.C.

=== Robert Reckmeyer ===
Dowd represented Robert Reckmeyer in a 1985 federal trial for distribution of illegal drugs. Reckmeyer pleaded guilty and was sentenced to 17 years in prison, but later it was reduced to 14 years. Later reduced to 8 years and 2 months for good behavior, released on November 2, 1992. Reckmeyer petitioned to vacate his sentence making the accusation that Dowd had requested and knowingly accepted illegally sourced funds as fees for his services. The grand jury brought no charges against Dowd and no action was taken by the District of Columbia Bar. Reckmeyer appealed the case to the Fourth Circuit Court of Appeals which affirmed the lower court's decision and later denied an en banc.

=== Iran–Contra affair ===
During the Iran–Contra affair, Dowd represented Colonel Robert C. Dutton, a former Air Force officer and an associate to Major General Richard Secord, who oversaw the contra air supply effort.

=== John McCain ===
Dowd represented Arizona Senator John McCain during the Senate Ethics Investigation known as the Keating Five in hearings held in 1990 and 1991. John McCain was cleared for impropriety by the Senate committee, but was reprimanded and criticized for his poor judgment.

=== ADM ===
Akin Gump was retained by Archer Daniels Midland (ADM) during the lysine price-fixing conspiracy to develop a defense strategy following the FBI raid of ADM's offices in June 1995. For four hours, Dowd interviewed employee Mark Whitacre, who at the time was an informant for the FBI. Whitacre told Dowd about his role as an informant and Dowd immediately informed ADM's management, who in retaliation, accused Whitacre of embezzlement. In the film, The Informant!, which is based on the lysine price-fixing conspiracy, Dowd was portrayed by stand-up comedian Bob Zany.

=== Fife Symington ===
Arizona governor Fife Symington retained Dowd as an adviser when he faced questioning from United States House Committee on Financial Services over the Savings and loan crisis in the late-1980s and early-1990s on using his position improperly to access loans with favorable terms. Dowd represented Symington during the latter's trial for extortion and bank fraud in 1996 and 1997, of which he was convicted for bank fraud. Symington was convicted on 7 of the 21 counts and acquitted on 3, with the other 11 resulting in a hung jury. His conviction was reversed by the Ninth Circuit Court of Appeals in 2000. Symington was later pardoned by President Bill Clinton in 2001. Symington had once saved an intoxicated 19 year old Bill Clinton from a rip tide off of Massachusetts.

=== Monica Goodling ===
Dowd represented Monica Goodling in the dismissal of U.S. attorneys overseen by Attorney General, Alberto Gonzales. Goodling was advised by Dowd to invoke the fifth and avoid testifying to Congress about the firing of eight U.S. attorneys. Dowd said that the investigation was "hostile". Goodling took his advice. As a result, the Committee obtained an immunity order from the Chief Judge, USDC DC directing her to testify. Ms. Goodling testified in public pursuant to the Court's order. The Chairman of the Committee said Goodling's testimony was the most honest and complete he had ever heard.

=== Raj Rajaratnam ===
Dowd defended hedge fund manager Raj Rajaratnam, founder of the Galleon Group, in his insider trading case. Dowd flipped off a photographer in May 2011 following Rajaratnam's conviction.

=== Donald Trump ===
From June 2017 until March 2018, Dowd was a personal attorney representing President Donald Trump in the special counsel investigation into possible collusion between Russia and the Trump campaign. Dowd recommended to President Trump that attorney Ty Cobb be added to his legal team to manage matters with the special counsel.

On December 2, 2017, the day after Mike Flynn plead guilty in federal court and agreed to cooperate with the special counsel's investigation, controversy erupted over Trump's tweeting about firing Flynn. It was reported Dowd had drafted the tweet that stated Trump had to fire General Flynn after he lied to the vice president and the FBI. Dowd did not comment, and referred reporters to fellow Trump attorney Ty Cobb's statement; however, Cobb said nothing about lying to the FBI being a factor in Flynn's firing. Legal commentators quickly raised the question of whether, in fact, Trump knew Flynn lied to the FBI when he fired him in February 2017. Ten days prior on November 22, Dowd sent a voicemail to Rob Kelner, an attorney of Mike Flynn, in which Dowd asked for a "heads up" of where the special counsel's probe was headed. The Department of Justice released a transcript of the voicemail on May 31, 2019.

On March 22, 2018, Dowd resigned as Trump's lead attorney in the Russia inquiry. Dowd cited Trump's repeatedly ignoring advice, clashing over legal strategy, and the recent hire of attorney Joseph diGenova to the legal team as justification for his resignation, while Trump cited his lack of confidence in Dowd to handle the investigation.

=== Lev Parnas and Igor Fruman ===
Lev Parnas and Igor Fruman retained the services of Dowd in October 2019. President Trump consented to allow Dowd to represent them as evidenced in an email from Counsel to the President's Attorney Jay Sekulow. The email was given to the US House of Representatives by Parnas. Dowd emailed the House Intelligence Committee that they would not comply with an October 7 deadline to hand over documents concerning an impeachment inquiry of President Trump. The two men had previously peddled information to President Trump's attorney, Rudy Giuliani, about Ukrainian corruption involving Joe Biden and Hillary Clinton. On October 9, Fruman and Parnas were arrested and indicted for funneling foreign money into U.S. elections. Parnas severed ties with Dowd the following month in preparation to comply with requests for record and testimony into the impeachment inquiry.

== Baseball investigations ==
Dowd was the Special Counsel to the Commissioner of Baseball that led to the banning of MLB player and manager Pete Rose for the Cincinnati Reds. In his role as Special Counsel to the Commissioners, Peter Ueberroth and subsequently A. Bartlett Giamatti, he submitted a 225-page report in May 1989, which detailed Rose's betting on baseball games in the 1980s. The report led to Rose's being placed on baseball's ineligible list in August 1989, even though "no evidence was discovered that Rose bet against the Reds" according to Dowd. Dowd mentioned in a 2002 ESPN interview that he "probably did". Rose later filed a defamation suit against Dowd in July 2016 after comments Dowd made in a radio interview in mid-2016 alluding to Rose engaging in statutory rape. A sworn statement was filed in July 2017 in Dowd's defense alleging that Rose had a sexual relationship with a minor. The case was dismissed in December 2017 after both parties settled out of court for undisclosed terms.

In addition to investigating Rose, Dowd scrutinized several members of MLB for betting. Dowd investigated outfielder Lenny Dykstra over allegations of betting on baseball games in 1991. Dykstra was cleared, but admonished for his gambling addiction. Manager Don Zimmer and two umpires, Rich Garcia and Frank Pulli, were given two years probation in 1989 for sports betting. The investigation was kept secret until 2002 when the New York Daily News disclosed it.

At the request of Baseball Commissioner Fay Vincent, Dowd was assigned to compile a report on New York Yankees owner George Steinbrenner's $40,000 payment to Howard Spira to dig up dirt on outfielder Dave Winfield in 1990. His work led to Vincent banning Steinbrenner's day-to-day operations of the Yankees on July 30, but was later sued by Yankees' minority owners Harold M. Bowman and Daniel R. McCarthy. The suit where Bowman and McCarthy sought $30,000 in damages from Dowd was thrown out in court in early 1991 by District Judge Robert W. Sweet.

During the Mitchell Report, which looked into the culture of steroid abuse in MLB, Dowd brought up allegations against former Maine Senator George J. Mitchell about the independence of the probe. It was after the release of the report that Dowd was convinced that Mitchell had done a good job.

== Personal life ==
Dowd is married to Carole Dowd (née Folts) and resides in Chatham, Massachusetts. They have three sons: Daniel, Michael and Thomas and two daughters: Anne and Sarah.

== See also ==
- Russian interference in the 2016 United States elections
