= Dowd Report =

1989 report on Pete Rose's baseball betting

- Author: John M. Dowd; Akin, Gump, Hauer & Feld
- Language: English
- Subject: Sports betting
- Publisher: Office of the Commissioner of Baseball
- Publication date: June 27, 1989
- Publication place: United States
- Media type: Paperback
- Pages: 225

The Dowd Report is the document describing the transgressions of baseball player and manager Pete Rose in betting on baseball, which precipitated his agreement to a permanent ban from the sport in the United States. The 225-page report was prepared by Special Counsel to the Commissioner John M. Dowd and was submitted to Commissioner Bart Giamatti in May 1989. The report, published in June 1989, was accompanied by seven volumes of exhibits, which included bank and telephone records, alleged betting records, expert reports, and transcripts of interviews with Rose and other witnesses.

Rose was ultimately placed on baseball's ineligible list in August 1989. The most controversial conclusion of the report, that Rose had bet on baseball games while managing the Cincinnati Reds, was confirmed 15 years later by Rose himself through his autobiography My Prison Without Bars.

Dowd later donated the Dowd Report collections to his alma mater, Emory University School of Law, in 2015.

On May 13, 2025—seven months after Rose died—MLB officially removed him (and all other dead baseball players) from the permanently ineligible list, restoring his eligibility to be elected to the Baseball Hall of Fame.
