= Pete Rose =

American baseball player (1941–2024)

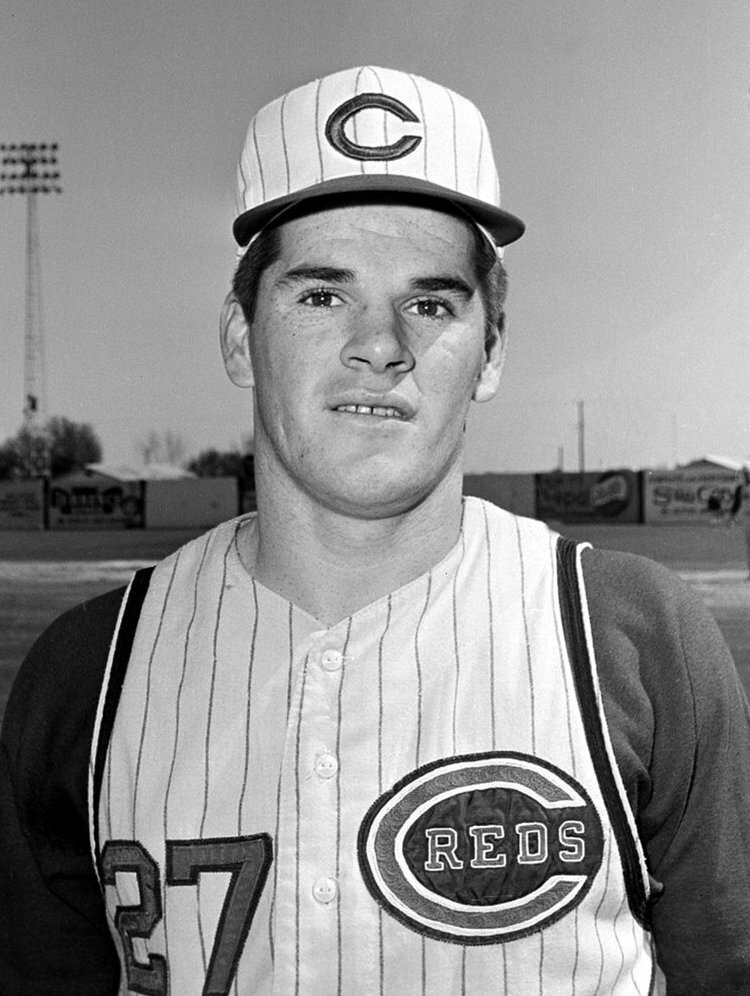
- Rose, c. 1963
- Outfielder / Infielder / Manager
- Born: April 14, 1941; Cincinnati, Ohio, U.S.
- Died: September 30, 2024 (aged 83); Las Vegas, Nevada, U.S.
- Batted: Switch Threw: Right

MLB debut
- April 8, 1963, for the Cincinnati Reds

Last MLB appearance
- August 17, 1986, for the Cincinnati Reds

MLB statistics
- Batting average: .303
- Hits: 4,256
- Home runs: 160
- Runs batted in: 1,314
- Managerial record: 412–373
- Winning %: .525
- Stats at Baseball Reference

Teams
- As player: Cincinnati Reds (1963–1978); Philadelphia Phillies (1979–1983); Montreal Expos (1984); Cincinnati Reds (1984–1986); As manager: Cincinnati Reds (1984–1989)

Career highlights and awards
- 17× All-Star (1965, 1967–1971, 1973–1982, 1985); 3× World Series champion (1975, 1976, 1980); NL MVP (1973); World Series MVP (1975); NL Rookie of the Year (1963); 2× Gold Glove Award (1969, 1970); Silver Slugger Award (1981); Roberto Clemente Award (1976); 3× NL batting champion (1968, 1969, 1973); Cincinnati Reds No. 14 retired; Cincinnati Reds Hall of Fame; Major League Baseball All-Century Team; MLB records: 4,256 career hits; 3,562 career games played

Peter Edward Rose Sr. (April 14, 1941 – September 30, 2024), nicknamed "Charlie Hustle", was an American professional baseball player and manager. He played in Major League Baseball (MLB) from 1963 to 1986, most prominently as a member of the Cincinnati Reds lineup known as the Big Red Machine for their dominance of the National League in the 1970s. He also played for the Philadelphia Phillies, where he won his third World Series championship in 1980, and had a brief stint with the Montreal Expos. He managed the Reds from 1984 to 1989.

A switch hitter, Rose remains the MLB's all-time leader in hits (4,256), games played (3,562), at-bats (14,053), singles (3,215), and outs (10,328). He won three World Series championships, three batting titles, two Gold Glove Awards, a Most Valuable Player Award, and a Rookie of the Year Award. He made 17 All-Star appearances in an unequaled five positions (second baseman, left fielder, right fielder, third baseman, and first baseman). He won two Gold Glove Awards when he was an outfielder, in 1969 and 1970. He also has the third-longest hit streak in MLB history at 44, and remains the last player to hit safely in 40 or more consecutive games.

In August 1989, his last year as a manager and three years after retiring as a player, Rose was penalized with permanent ineligibility from baseball amid accusations that he gambled on baseball games while he played for and managed the Reds; the charges of wrongdoing included claims that he bet on his own team. In 1991, the Baseball Hall of Fame formally voted to ban those on the "permanently ineligible" list from induction, after previously excluding such players by informal agreement among voters. After years of public denial, he admitted in 2004 in a published autobiography called My Prison Without Bars that he had bet on baseball and on the Reds while he was managing the team but never bet on his team to lose. The issue of his election to the Hall of Fame remains contentious throughout baseball. In 2026, he was posthumously reinstated and became eligible for the Hall of Fame.

== Early life ==
Peter Edward Rose was born on April 14, 1941, in Cincinnati, Ohio, one of four children born to Harry Francis "Pete" Rose and LaVerne (née Bloebaum) Rose. Encouraged by his parents to participate in sports, Rose played baseball and football at Western Hills High School.

Although small for his age, Rose earned the starting running back position on his freshman football team due to his speed and agility. When he failed to make the varsity football team the following year, Rose was dejected and soon lost interest in his studies. He ended up repeating his sophomore year of high school because instead of going to summer school at his father's urging Rose played off-season summer baseball which helped him refine his skills and allowed him an extra year to mature physically.

When Rose finally reached his senior year, he had used up his four years of high school sports eligibility. In the spring of 1960, he played baseball in the Dayton Amateur League for a team sponsored by Frisch's Big Boy of Lebanon, Ohio. Rose demonstrated versatility by successfully playing the positions of catcher, second base, and shortstop and compiled an exceptional .626 batting average. Despite these impressive stats, this would have been the pinnacle of Rose's baseball career if not for the intervention of his maternal uncle, Buddy Bloebaum, a "bird dog" scout for the Cincinnati Reds. At Bloebaum's urging, the Reds, who had recently traded away a number of prospects who turned out to be very good, reluctantly decided to take a chance on the inexperienced but raw talented Rose. Upon his graduation from high school in 1960, he signed a professional contract for $7,000 (around $78,090.91 in 2026 adjusted for inflation). He played with the Macon Peaches, a minor league affiliate of the Cincinnati Reds, from 1962 to 1963.

== Professional career ==
=== Cincinnati Reds (1963–1978) ===
==== NL Rookie of the Year ====
During a spring training game against the Chicago White Sox in 1963, the Reds' regular second baseman, Don Blasingame, pulled a groin muscle; Rose got his chance and made the most of it. During another spring training game against the New York Yankees, Whitey Ford gave Rose the derisive nickname "Charlie Hustle" after he sprinted to first base after drawing a walk. Rose adopted that insult as a badge of honor and his iconic trademark. In Ken Burns's documentary Baseball, Ford's teammate (and best friend) Mickey Mantle claimed that Ford gave Rose the nickname after Rose, playing in left field, made an effort to climb the fence to try to catch a Mantle home run that was about 100 feet over his head. According to Mantle, when he returned to the dugout, Ford said, "Hey, Mick, did you see ol' Charley Hustle out there trying to catch that ball?"

On April 8, 1963, Rose made his MLB debut against the Pittsburgh Pirates at Crosley Field and drew a walk in his first plate appearance. After going 0-for-11, Rose got his first career major league hit on April 13, a triple off Pittsburgh's Bob Friend. He hit .273 for the year and won the National League (NL) Rookie of the Year Award, collecting 17 of 20 votes.

Rose entered the United States Army Reserves after the 1963 baseball season. He was assigned to Fort Knox for six months of active duty, followed by six years of attendance with the 478th Engineering Battalion, an army reserve unit, at Fort Thomas, Kentucky. At Fort Knox, Rose was a platoon guide. Rose remained at Fort Knox to assist his sergeant in training the next platoon and to help another sergeant train the fort's baseball team. Later in his Fort Thomas service, Rose served as a company cook, which entailed coming in early for the one-weekend-per-month meeting so that he could leave early enough to participate in Reds home games. Other Reds players in the unit included Johnny Bench and Alex Johnson.

==== Early years ====
In an April 23, 1964, road contest against the Houston Colt .45's, Rose reached first base on an error in the top of the ninth inning of a scoreless game and scored on another error. The Colt.45s lost the game in the bottom of the ninth inning, and Ken Johnson became the first major league pitcher to lose a complete game no-hitter.

Rose slumped late in the season and was benched; he finished with a .269 average. To improve his batting, Rose played in the Venezuelan Winter League with Leones del Caracas during the 1964–1965 offseason. Rose came back to the Reds in 1965, leading the league in hits (209) and at-bats (670), and finishing sixth in NL MVP balloting. It was the first of his 10 seasons with 200-plus hits, and his .312 batting average was the first of nine consecutive .300 seasons. He hit a career-high 16 home runs in 1966, then switched positions from second base to right field the following year.

In 1968, Rose started the season with a 22-game hitting streak, missed three weeks (including the All-Star Game) with a broken thumb, then had a 19-game hitting streak late in the season. He had to finish the season 6-for-9 to beat out the Pirates' Matty Alou and win the first of two close NL batting-title races with a .335 average. He finished second to St. Louis Cardinals pitcher Bob Gibson for the NL MVP award, earning six first-place votes.

The following year, Rose set a career-high in batting (.348) and tied his career-best 16 homers. As the Reds' leadoff man, he had 218 hits, walked 88 times, and paced the league in runs with 120. He hit 33 doubles and 11 triples, drove in 82 runs, slugged .512 (by far the highest mark of his long career), and had a .432 on-base percentage (also a career best). Despite Pittsburgh's Roberto Clemente going 3-for-4 in the final game, Rose's 1-for-4 was good enough for the title; Rose finished at .348; Clemente at .345.

==== 1970 All-Star Game ====
Brand-new Riverfront Stadium had been open for only two weeks on July 14, 1970, when Rose was involved in one of the most infamous plays in All-Star Game history. Facing the California Angels' Clyde Wright in the 12th inning, Rose singled and advanced to second on another single by the Los Angeles Dodgers' Billy Grabarkewitz. The Chicago Cubs' Jim Hickman then singled sharply to center. Amos Otis's throw went past Cleveland Indians catcher Ray Fosse, as Rose barreled over Fosse to score the winning run. Fosse suffered a fractured and separated shoulder, which went undiagnosed until the next year. Fosse continued to hit for average and finished the season at .307, but with diminished power. He had 16 home runs before the break, but only two afterward. He played with the Indians until the 1972 season, but never approached his first-year numbers. The collision also caused Rose to miss three games with a bruised knee.

==== 1973 NL MVP season ====
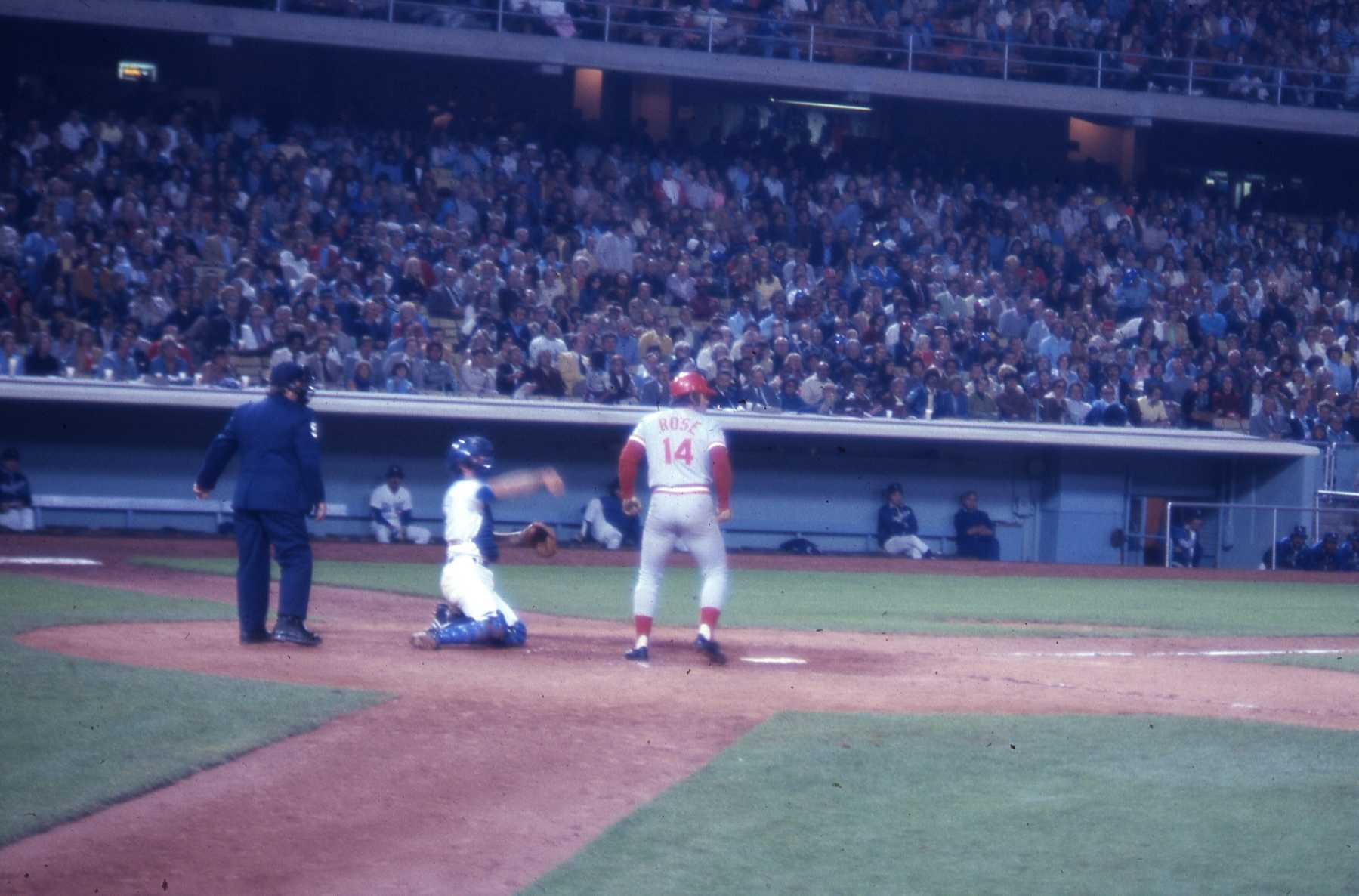
Rose at bat during a game in the 1970s

In 1973, Rose led the league with 230 hits and a .338 batting average en route to winning the NL MVP award and leading "the Big Red Machine" to the 1973 National League Championship Series against the New York Mets.

During the fifth inning of game three of the series, Rose was on first base when Joe Morgan hit a double play ball to Mets first baseman John Milner. Rose slid into second base in an attempt to break up the double play. This incited a fight with Mets shortstop Bud Harrelson that resulted in a bench-clearing brawl. When the Reds took the field, the game was nearly called off after the Shea Stadium crowd threw objects at Rose from the stands. The disruption caused Reds manager Sparky Anderson to pull his team off the field until order was restored. Mets manager Yogi Berra and players Willie Mays, Tom Seaver, Cleon Jones, and Rusty Staub were summoned by NL President Chub Feeney out to left field to calm the fans. The Reds ended up losing the game, 9–2, and the NLCS, 3–2, despite Rose's .381 batting average in the series, including his eighth-inning home run to tie game one and his 12th-inning home run to win game four. Also around this time, Rose, who had previously sported a crewcut, grew his now-famous bowl cut, a hair style he would wear for the rest of his career.

==== The Big Red Machine ====
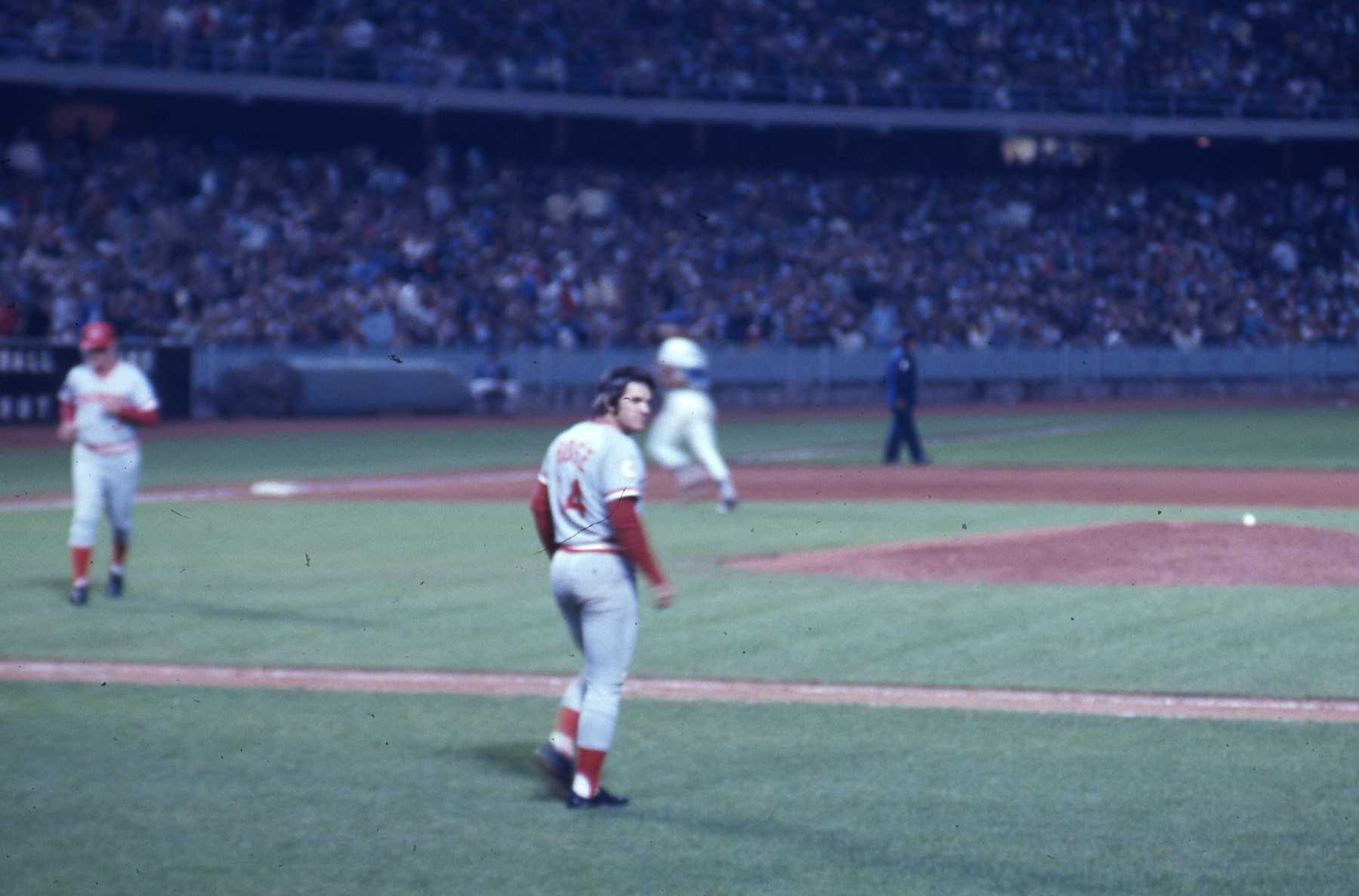
Rose walking onto the field at Dodger Stadium with the Cincinnati Reds in 1976

The Cincinnati Reds of the 1970s earned the nickname "the Big Red Machine" as one of the greatest teams in MLB history, including future Hall of Famers Johnny Bench, Joe Morgan, and Tony Pérez. Rose was viewed as one of the club's leaders.

Rose was a significant factor in the Reds' success in 1975 and 1976, when he successfully moved from the outfield to third base. Earlier in his career, the Reds and then-manager Don Heffner tried to force Rose to third base, but Rose chafed at the move, and it was soon abandoned. In the spring of 1975, manager Sparky Anderson, knowing how Rose would react to being forced to move, instead asked him if he would do so for the good of the team. Rose immediately agreed. This move strengthened third base and helped to solidify the Reds for those two championship seasons, because it made room for power-hitting outfielder George Foster. In 1975, Rose earned World Series MVP honors in leading the Reds to their first championship since 1940, a seven-game triumph over the Boston Red Sox. Rose led the team with 10 hits and a .370 batting average in the seven games. He was awarded the Hickok Belt as the top professional athlete of the year, as well as Sports Illustrated magazine's "Sportsman of the Year" award.

The following year, Rose was a major force in helping the Reds repeat as World Series champions. The 1976 Reds swept the Philadelphia Phillies in the best-three-of-five NLCS, followed by a four-game sweep of the Yankees in the World Series. The 1976 club remains the only team since the expansion of the playoffs in 1969 to go undefeated in the postseason, and the Reds franchise has not lost a World Series game since game six in 1975 (wins in game seven in 1975, and four-game sweeps in 1976 and 1990).

==== Three home-run game and 3,000th hit ====
On April 29, 1978 at Shea Stadium, in a 14–7 rout against the New York Mets, Rose hit a career-high three home runs off of three different pitchers and went 5-for-6, which was perhaps the greatest performance of his career.

Six days later, on May 5, Rose became the 13th player in MLB history to garner his 3,000th career hit when he singled off Montreal Expos pitcher Steve Rogers in front of 37,823 fans at home field Riverfront Stadium.

==== 44-game hitting streak ====
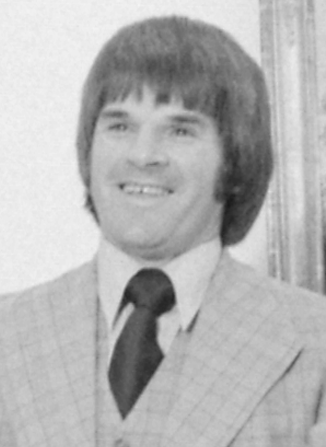
Rose in 1978

On June 14, 1978, Rose singled in the first inning off Cubs pitcher Dave Roberts; Rose proceeded to get a hit in every game he played until August 1, making a run at Joe DiMaggio's record 56-game hitting streak, which had stood virtually unchallenged for 37 years. The streak started quietly, but by the time it had reached 30 games, the media took notice and a pool of reporters accompanied Rose and the Reds to every game. On July 19, in a game against the Phillies, Rose was hitless going into the eighth inning when he walked. His team was trailing in the ninth inning and the streak appeared over, but the Reds batted through their entire lineup and gave Rose another chance to bat. Rose faced Ron Reed and laid down a perfect bunt single to extend the streak to 32 games.

Rose eventually tied Willie Keeler's 1897 single-season NL record at 44 games, but the streak came to an end on August 1 when Gene Garber of the Atlanta Braves struck out Rose in the ninth inning. With two outs and a 2–2 count, Garber decided not to challenge Rose with a fastball. He took full advantage of Rose's predicament by throwing him an off-speed pitch out of the strike zone, at which Rose swung and missed. Rose was livid after the game, blasting Garber and the Braves for treating the situation "like it was the ninth inning of the seventh game of the World Series". Garber took the comment as a compliment: "I said to myself, 'Well, thanks, Pete. That's how I try to pitch every time I'm in a game.'"

=== Philadelphia Phillies (1979–1983) ===
The Philadelphia Phillies had won the National League East three years running (1976–1978)—two of which were won with 101-win seasons—but they were unable to make it to the World Series. In 1979, the Phillies believed that Rose was the player who could bring them over the top, and they temporarily made him the highest-paid athlete in team sports when they signed him to a four-year, $3.2-million (approximately $14.55 million in 2026 adjusted for inflation) contract as a free agent. With perennial All-Star Mike Schmidt firmly entrenched at third, Rose moved to first base.

Although the Phillies missed the postseason in Rose's first year with the team, they earned three division titles (one in the first half of the strike-shortened 1981 season), two World Series appearances, and their first World Series title (1980) in the following four years.

Rose had the worst season of his career in 1983, which was also the season that the Phillies played in their second World Series in four years. The 42-year-old Rose batted only .245 with 121 hits and found himself benched during the latter part of the 1983 season when he appeared periodically to play and pinch hit. Rose did blossom as a pinch-hitter, with eight hits in 22 at-bats, a .364 average.

Rose bounced back during the postseason, batting .375 (6-for-16) during the NLCS against the Los Angeles Dodgers, and .312 (5-for-16) in the World Series against the Baltimore Orioles. Rose went 1-for-8 in the first two games in Baltimore and was benched for game three in Philadelphia, though he grounded out in a pinch-hitting appearance. In a pre-game interview with Howard Cosell of ABC Sports, Rose objected to manager Paul Owens' decision to bench him. Rose bounced back with four hits in his last seven at-bats in the remaining two games, though the Phillies lost the Series to the Orioles, four games to one.

=== Montreal Expos (1984) ===
Rose was granted an unconditional release from the Phillies in late October 1983. Phillies management wanted to retain Rose for the 1984 season, but he refused to accept a more limited playing role. Months later, he signed a one-year contract with the Montreal Expos.

On April 13, 1984, the 21st anniversary of his first career hit, Rose doubled off the Phillies' Jerry Koosman for his 4,000th career hit, becoming the second player in the 4,000 hit club (joining Ty Cobb). Rose played 95 games with the Expos, accumulating 72 hits and 23 RBIs while batting .259.

=== Return to Cincinnati (1984–1986) ===
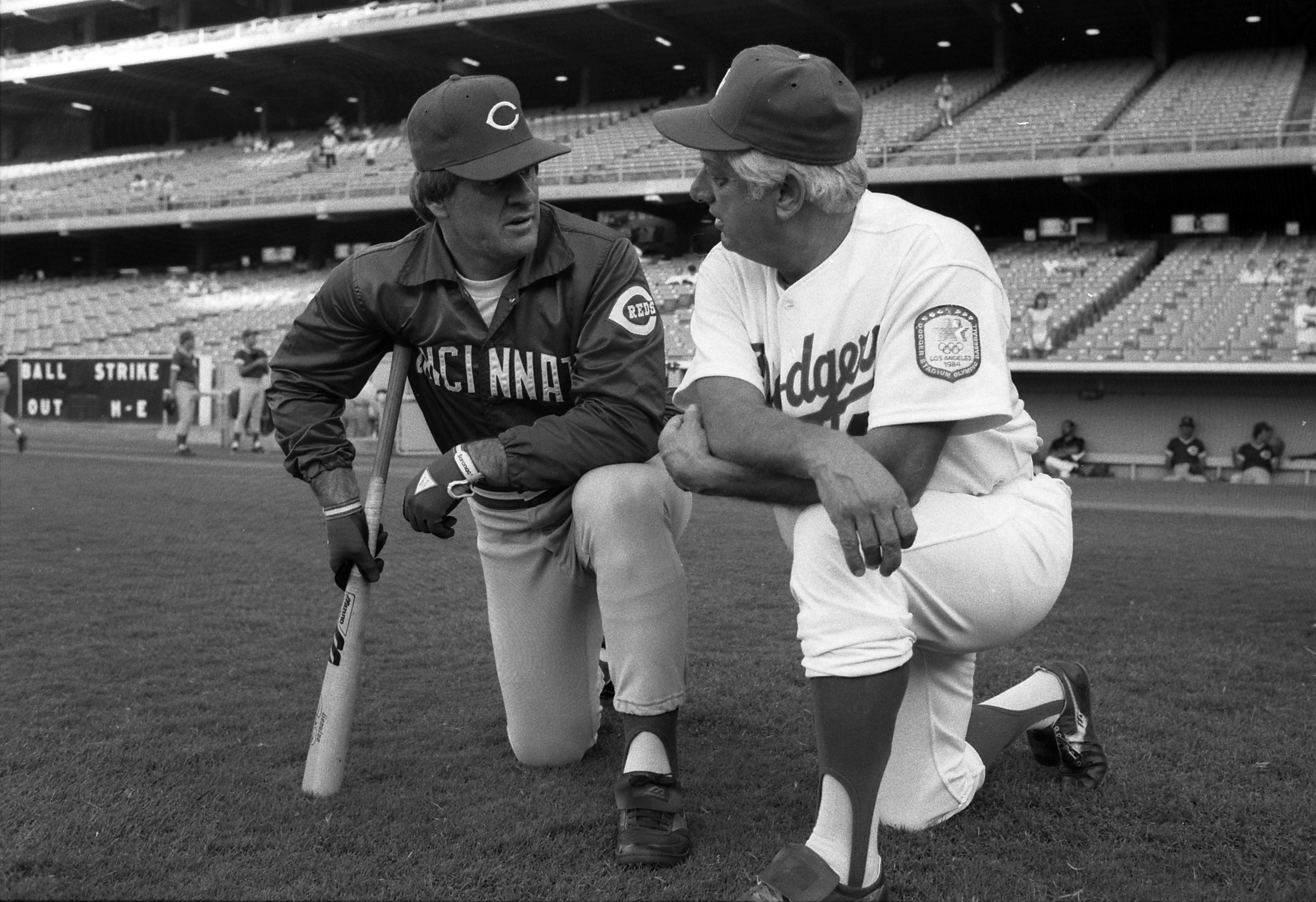
Rose (left) with Tommy Lasorda before a game in April 1985

On August 15, 1984, the Expos traded Rose back to the Reds for infielder Tom Lawless. Upon rejoining the Reds, Rose was immediately named player-manager, replacing Vern Rapp as manager. Despite his .259 average for the season prior to joining the Reds, he hit .365 for the Reds in 26 games (with 35 hits and 11 RBIs), finishing with a .286 overall average—a 41-point improvement over the 1983 season. Furthermore, Rose managed the Reds to a 19–22 record for the remainder of the season. Though the role was once common, to date, Rose is the last person to serve as a player-manager in MLB.

On September 8, 1985, Rose collected his 4,190th and 4,191st hits at Wrigley Field off Reggie Patterson in a game that was called due to darkness after the two teams were tied 5–5 in the 9th. According to MLB.com, MLB continues to recognize Cobb's final hit total as 4,191, though independent research has revealed two of Cobb's hits were accidentally counted twice. This would mean that Rose actually broke the all-time hits record in Chicago on the 8th. At any rate, on September 11, 1985, Rose broke Cobb's all-time hits record with his 4,192nd hit, a single to left-center field off San Diego Padres pitcher Eric Show that had Rose get a minutes-long standing ovation from the hometown Cincinnati crowd at Riverfront Stadium. After Rose broke Cobb's record, he was named Athlete of the Year by both ABC's Wide World of Sports and The Sporting News. Rose accumulated a total of 4,256 hits before his final career at-bat, a strikeout against San Diego's Goose Gossage on August 17, 1986.

In 2010, Deadspin reported Rose used corked bats during his 1985 pursuit of Cobb's record. Two sports memorabilia collectors who owned Rose's game-used bats from that season had the bats X-rayed and found the telltale signs of corking. Rose had previously denied using corked bats.

A report for ESPN: The Magazine noted that Rose had associated with Tommy Gioiosa, the manager of a Gold's Gym in suburban Cincinnati that sold anabolic steroids in the late 1980s. Gioiosa had first met and befriended Rose in 1978 during spring training, becoming a companion and runner to Rose over the next six years before bringing Rose to his gym in 1984. Rose reportedly had thought about taking a shot to help his bat speed near the end of his career, but told Gioiosa that it was "too late to try something new". Attempts to tell Rose about dealing in the gym fell on deaf ears. Gioiosa was later noted as the one individual with whom Rose made bets, along with later being convicted of conspiracy to sell 110 pounds (50 kg) of cocaine and filing a false tax return that included claiming a winning gambling ticket that had actually been Rose's.

=== Retirement as a player ===
On November 11, 1986, Rose was dropped from the Reds' 40-man roster to make room for pitcher Pat Pacillo, and he unofficially and unceremoniously retired as a player. Rose finished his career with an unprecedented number of MLB and NL records that have lasted for many years and are widely regarded as unbreakable by modern standards. Rose, always proud of his ability to hit .300 or better in 15 of his 24 playing seasons, had a lifetime .303 batting average.

== Career overall ==
=== Statistics and achievements ===
Note: All-time MLB leader in category is in bold.

Category	Years	WAR	G	PA	AB	R	H	2B	3B	HR	TB	RBI	SB	BB	AVG	OBP	SLG	OPS	FLD%
Total	24	79.6	**3,562**	**15,890**	**14,053**	2,165	**4,256**	746	135	160	5,752	1,314	198	1,566	.303	.375	.409	.784	.987

Source:Pete Rose Stats, Height, Weight, Position, Rookie Status & More

In 67 postseason games, including six World Series (1970, '72, '75, '76, '80, and '83), he batted .321 (86-for-268) with 30 runs scored, 13 doubles, two triples, five home runs, 22 RBI, 28 walks, .388 on-base percentage, .440 slugging percentage, and .828 on-base plus slugging percentage.

Rose was versatile in the field. He played every position except catcher, pitcher, and shortstop in his MLB career. By position, he played 939 games at first base, 628 games at second base, 634 games at third base, 673 games at left field, 73 games at center field, and 590 games at right field.

== Managerial career ==
=== Cincinnati Reds (1984–1989) ===
After retiring as a player, Rose remained with the Reds as manager until August 24, 1989. With a career record of 426–388 as a manager, Rose ranks fifth in Reds history for managerial wins. During his four full seasons at the helm (1985–1988), the Reds posted four second-place finishes in the NL West division but failed to make the playoffs.

=== Suspensions as a manager ===
==== Thirty-day suspension ====
On April 30, 1988, during a home game against the New York Mets, with two out in the top of the ninth inning, Mookie Wilson hit what looked like a routine ground ball to shortstop Barry Larkin, but the throw to first base was wide and pulled first baseman Nick Esasky's foot off the bag. Umpire Dave Pallone did not immediately make the safe call and Esasky waited for the call instead of making a play at the plate, allowing Howard Johnson to score from second base with what would turn out to be the game-winning run. Rose, visibly angry and animated, vehemently argued the call. Within seconds, the dispute escalated to the point where Rose forcefully pushed the umpire twice with his shoulder and forearm, knocking Pallone several feet backward. Pallone promptly ejected Rose, as touching an umpire is grounds for immediate ejection. Rose had to be forcibly restrained by his coaches as he came back at Pallone, claiming Pallone had initiated the physical contact. He can be seen in the footage of the incident pointing to his cheek, attempting to explain to umpire Eric Gregg that Pallone had poked him in the face. In his book, Pallone wrote an entire chapter on the incident and denied touching Rose, writing that NL personnel who investigated the incident later agreed with him.

In the time it took to remove Rose, Cincinnati fans began showering the field with objects that included radios and cigarette lighters. Though the inning was not over, all of the players retreated to the dugouts. Reds' owner Marge Schott posted a message onto the electronic billboard, asking fans to stop throwing objects onto the field. After a 15-minute suspension of play, Pallone left the field and the game was completed with the remaining three umpires. NL president A. Bartlett Giamatti suspended Rose for 30 days, which as of 2026 remains the longest suspension levied against a manager for an on-field incident. He also fined Rose "a substantial amount" which was not disclosed. Giamatti said, "Such incidents are not business as usual and will not be allowed to become so."

Giamatti also summoned Marty Brennaman and Joe Nuxhall, the Reds' on-air radio announcers, to his office in New York City and chastised them for inciting the fan response with "inflammatory and completely irresponsible remarks" about Pallone's qualifications. Giamatti said he was within his rights to summon Brennaman and Nuxhall because they worked for the Reds, not their flagship station WLW. He told them, "There is no excuse for encouraging a situation where the physical safety and well-being of any individual is put significantly at risk. Nothing justifies such unprofessional behavior."

== Betting scandal, permanent banishment, and posthumous reinstatement ==
=== Investigation ===
Amid reports that he had bet on baseball, Rose was informally questioned in February 1989 by Giamatti and Commissioner of Baseball Peter Ueberroth. With his lawyer present, Rose stated that he had bet on football, basketball, and horseracing, but vehemently denied the allegations of betting on baseball. By this time, MLB owners had elected Giamatti to succeed Ueberroth, and the outgoing commissioner decided to defer the matter to his successor. In the meantime, Sports Illustrated gave the public its first detailed report of the allegations that Rose had placed bets on baseball games on March 21, 1989, in the cover story of the issue dated April 3, 1989. Giamatti assumed office as the seventh Commissioner of Baseball on April 1. Three days later, lawyer John M. Dowd was retained to investigate the charges against Rose.

Dowd interviewed many of Rose's associates, including alleged bookmakers and bet runners. He delivered a summary of his findings to the commissioner in May. In it, Dowd documented Rose's alleged gambling activities in 1985 and 1986 and compiled a day-by-day account of his alleged betting on baseball games in 1987. The Dowd report documented alleged bets on 52 Reds games in 1987, citing Rose wagered a minimum of $10,000 a day (equivalent to $28,500 in 2025 adjusted for inflation); whereas others allegedly involved in the activities claim that number was actually $2,000 a day.

Although the Dowd report states that "no evidence was discovered that Rose bet against the Reds", Dowd himself stated in a December 2002 interview that he believed Rose probably bet against the Reds while managing them. Those critical of Rose's behavior, including Ohio's own Hall of Fame baseball reporter, Hal McCoy, have observed that "the major problem with Rose betting on baseball, particularly the Reds, is that as manager, he could control games, make decisions that could enhance his chances of winning his bets, thus jeopardizing the integrity of the game." The MLB rule that Rose violated prohibits any bet on a game in which the bettor is involved, making no distinction between betting for or against one's team. The rule is: "Rule 21 Misconduct, (d) Betting on Ball Games, subsection (ii): Any player, umpire, or club, or league official, or employee, who shall bet any sum whatsoever upon any baseball game in connection with which the bettor has a duty to perform shall be declared permanently ineligible."

Rose continued to deny all of the accusations against him and refused to appear at a hearing with Giamatti on the matter. He filed a lawsuit in the Hamilton County Court of Common Pleas, the state trial court covering Cincinnati, alleging that the commissioner had prejudged the case and could not provide a fair hearing. The Court of Common Pleas issued a temporary restraining order to delay the hearing, but Giamatti sought to remove the case to the federal United States District Court for the Southern District of Ohio. The Southern District of Ohio granted Giamatti's removal petition. The parties thereafter entered settlement negotiations.

=== Aftermath ===
On August 24, 1989, Rose voluntarily accepted a permanent place on baseball's ineligible list. He accepted that a factual reason existed for the ban. In return, MLB agreed to make no formal finding with regard to the gambling allegations. According to baseball's rules, Rose could apply for reinstatement in one year, but Giamatti said, "There is absolutely no deal for reinstatement. That is exactly what we did not agree to in terms of a fixed number of years." Despite this statement, Rose still held out hope that the lifetime ban was temporary and would be reversed within one year if he was given a chance to clean up his act. Rose, with a 412–373 record, was replaced as Reds manager by Tommy Helms.

Giamatti unexpectedly died of a heart attack on September 1, 1989, at the age of fifty-one, just eight days after announcing Rose's lifetime suspension and was subsequently replaced by Fay Vincent who upheld Rose's lifetime ban.

==== National Baseball Hall of Fame eligibility ====
On February 4, 1991, the Hall of Fame voted formally to exclude individuals on the permanently ineligible list from being inducted by way of the Baseball Writers' Association of America (BBWAA) vote. A longstanding unwritten rule already barred permanently ineligible players from enshrinement. At the beginning of the 2024 season, Rose, Tucupita Marcano (banned in 2024 for betting on his own team's games), and Roberto Alomar (banned in 2021 for sexual misconduct towards a female Toronto Blue Jays staffer) were the only living former players on the ineligible list (although former executive Chris Correa is also on the list for other infractions); Alomar was enshrined several years before his banishment in 2011, and his plaque remains in the hall and cannot be revoked. Players who were not selected by the BBWAA could be considered by the Veterans Committee in the first year after they would have lost their place on the BBWAA ballot. Under the Hall's rules at the time, players could appear on the ballot for only 15 years, beginning five years after they retired. Had he not been banned from baseball, Rose's name probably would have been on the writers' ballot beginning in 1992 and ending in 2006. Given his significant unprecedented contributions to baseball and setting records that are considered unbreakable, Rose most likely would have been an inductee in his first year of eligibility joining the class of 1992 Rose also would have been eligible for consideration by the Veterans Committee in 2007, but due to his lifetime ban did not appear on the ballot. In 2008, the Veterans Committee voted unanimously to bar players and managers on the permanently ineligible list from consideration. Eight years later, Rose unsuccessfully petitioned the Hall of Fame to permit his name to be submitted for induction, saying that he had not expected to be prevented from consideration when agreeing to the lifetime ban.

Although he will not be eligible for the Hall of Fame until December 2027 under the terms of the Fawn Rose and Jeffrey M. Lenkov agreement, artifacts from Rose's career are still on display inside the Hall's museum, located on the floor above the plaque gallery. When Rose was still ineligible for the Baseball Hall of Fame at the time he was still inducted into the Cincinnati Reds Hall of Fame in 2016.

==== Previous unsuccessful reinstatement efforts ====
In 1992, Rose applied for reinstatement. Fay Vincent, who as deputy commissioner had played a key role in negotiating the agreement banning Rose before becoming commissioner after Giamatti's death, never acted on Rose's application. In September 1998, Rose applied for reinstatement with Vincent's successor, Bud Selig, but Selig also never acted on it.

In public comments, Selig said he saw no reason to reconsider Rose's punishment. In March 2003, he acknowledged that he was considering Rose's application, leading to speculation that Rose's return might be imminent. Ultimately, Selig took no action.

Representatives for Rose applied in 2015 for reinstatement with Selig's successor, Rob Manfred. On December 15 of that year, Manfred rejected the request. Manfred stated that Rose had not been forthcoming about his gambling and that Rose (who by this time was living in Las Vegas) was still betting on baseball. Although Rose was placing legal bets by this time, MLB had long barred players, managers, and coaches from any form of gambling on baseball, legal or otherwise. He also felt that Rose did not have "a mature understanding of his wrongful conduct" and the damage it had done to the game. For these reasons, Manfred concluded that allowing him back in the game would be an "unacceptable risk".

In 2020, Rose, along with his lawyers, once again applied for reinstatement in the wake of the Houston Astros sign stealing scandal. In his petition, he stated that his gambling did not affect the outcome of games, whereas other players who used steroids or used electronic signs to steal catchers' signals, did affect games, yet were not banned. He also sent a petition to the Hall of Fame's board of directors, asking them to repeal their 1991 ban on players on the ineligible list. Neither Manfred nor the Hall of Fame's directors responded to this petition.

In 2022, Rose again applied for reinstatement. In a letter to Manfred, he stated that he "still think[s] every day about what it would mean to be considered for the Hall of Fame". Manfred quickly rejected the request and stated that any Hall of Fame discussions would be deferred to the Veteran's Committee.

When asked in March 2023 about whether or not MLB's emerging partnerships with sportsbooks would have an effect on Rose's ban, Manfred quickly shot down speculation about possible reinstatement and later affirmed his stance when further asked about it at that season's All-Star Game.

=== Posthumous reinstatement ===
On December 17, 2024, Fawn Rose and Rose family attorney Jeffrey M. Lenkov were in New York City to discuss the legal issues with filing for reinstatement. On January 8, 2025, Rose and Lenkov officially filed documents to remove her father from the permanently ineligible list.

On February 28, 2025, President Donald Trump posted on Truth Social that he would be giving Rose a posthumous pardon, though he remained vague about what crimes in particular would be annulled. He also criticized MLB and the BBWAA over Rose's ban, calling for reinstatement and an induction into the Hall of Fame. Manfred responded that he would review the ineligibility after the Fawn Rose meeting from December and the subsequent reinstatement documents filed by Lenkov and her. Manfred later met with Trump in April, and confirmed that Rose and his lifetime ban were among the topics discussed.

On May 13, 2025, Manfred instituted a change regarding permanent ineligibility, making it such that all bans expire after death of the person on the list. Manfred justified the move by stating that "a deceased individual cannot compromise the integrity of the game," while also acknowledging political pressure from Trump, who had announced his intention to pardon Rose and met with Manfred privately in April 2025.

Rose's posthumous reinstatement made him eligible for consideration by the Hall of Fame's Veterans Committee under the "Classic Baseball" category, which covers players whose primary contributions occurred prior to 1980. The next scheduled vote is expected to take place during the December 2027 MLB Winter Meetings.

Rose's reinstatement sparked renewed debate within the baseball community, with supporters highlighting the precedent it sets for other banned players such as "Shoeless" Joe Jackson, who was also reinstated under the same policy.

== Post-baseball life ==
=== Tax evasion conviction ===
On April 20, 1990, Rose entered a plea of guilty to two charges of filing false income tax returns not showing income he received from selling autographs and memorabilia and from horseracing winnings. On July 19, he was sentenced to five months in the minimum security prison camp at the United States Penitentiary in Marion, Illinois, and fined $50,000. Rose was released on January 7, 1991, after having paid $366,041 in back taxes and interest and was required to perform 1,000 hours of community service. Rose was posthumously pardoned by Trump on November 19, 2026.

=== MLB All-Century Team ===
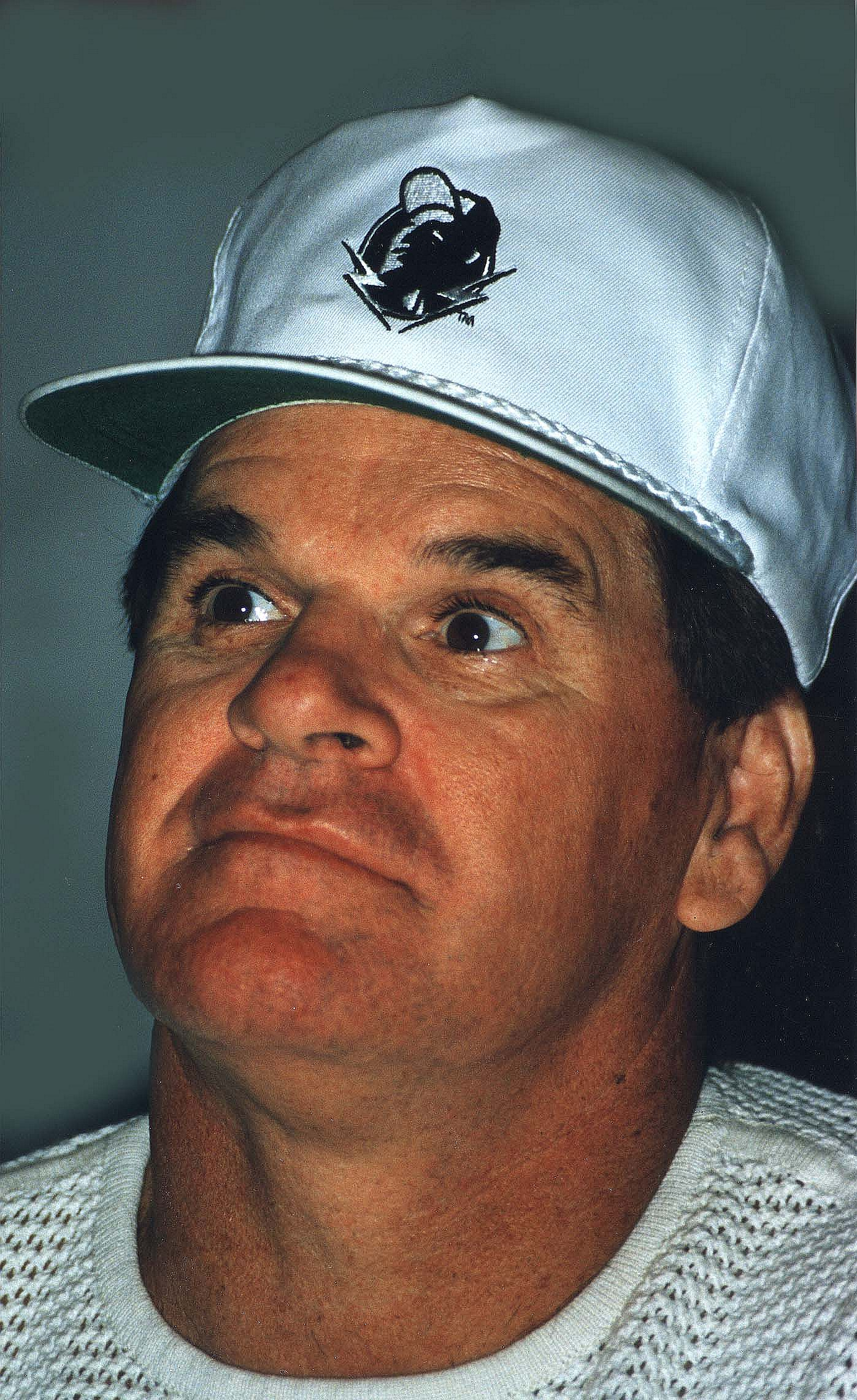
Rose in 1995

In 1999, Rose was selected as an outfielder on the Major League Baseball All-Century Team. To select the team, a panel of experts first compiled a list of the 100 greatest players from the past century. Fans then voted on the players using paper and online ballots. An exception was made to Rose's ban to allow him to participate in the pregame introduction of the All-Century team before game two of the 1999 World Series between the Atlanta Braves and the New York Yankees. Despite never having been a member of the Braves, Rose received the loudest ovation of the All-Century Team members from the crowd at Turner Field in Atlanta, Georgia.

After the ceremony on live television, NBC's Jim Gray repeatedly asked Rose if he was ready to admit to betting on baseball and apologize. Many people were outraged over Gray's aggressive questioning, feeling that it detracted from the ceremony. In protest, Yankees outfielder Chad Curtis refused to speak with Gray after his game-winning home run in game three. Earlier that season, Rose had been ranked at number 25 on The Sporting News' list of the 100 Greatest Baseball Players.

In 2002, Rose appeared during the 2002 World Series in a Mastercard-sponsored event recalling "Baseball's Most Memorable Moments". Fans voted Rose's record-breaking hit over Ty Cobb as the sixth-most memorable moment in baseball history.

While allowing him to participate in the All-Century Team and a September 2010 celebration at Great American Ball Park of the 25th anniversary of his 4,192nd hit, MLB refused to allow Rose to participate in other events in Cincinnati, such as the 25th anniversary reunion of the Big Red Machine, the closing of Cinergy Field, and the opening of Great American Ball Park, as well as the closing of Veterans Stadium in Philadelphia and 1980 Phillies anniversary celebrations. The year before his retirement in 2015, Selig stated that Rose could participate in the festivities for the 2015 MLB All-Star Game, which was held in Cincinnati (within subjective guidelines), and Rose took the field alongside Reds teammates prior to the game. In 2016, Rose had his jersey retired by the Reds, which had to be approved by MLB.

=== Sports gambling admission ===
In his autobiography My Prison Without Bars, published by Rodale, Inc. on January 8, 2004, Rose admitted publicly to betting on baseball games and other sports while playing for and managing the Reds. He also admitted to betting on Reds games, but said he never bet against the team. Rose repeated his admissions in an interview on the ABC news program Primetime Thursday. In the book, he stated that he hoped his admissions would help end his ban from baseball so he could reapply for reinstatement. Later in 2004, ESPN broadcast the television film Hustle, starring Tom Sizemore and directed by Peter Bogdanovich, which was primarily based on the Dowd Report.

In March 2007, during an interview on the Dan Patrick Show on ESPN Radio, Rose said, "I bet on my team every night. I didn't bet on my team four nights a week. I bet on my team to win every night because I loved my team, I believed in my team ... I did everything in my power every night to win that game."

Dowd disputed Rose's contention he bet on the Reds every night, asserting Rose did not bet on his team when Mario Soto or Bill Gullickson pitched. A notebook detailing Rose's daily betting activity shows Rose placed bets on five of the six games Soto started in 1987. The lone exception was April 26, 1987, when Rose allegedly placed bets on hockey and basketball games, but no baseball games. Also, Rose did not bet on the Reds in four games in which Gullickson started.

Even after his 2004 admission of gambling, Rose had described his violation of MLB rules with what journalist Kostya Kennedy described as "a kind of swagger, that familiar screw-you defiance". On September 11, 2010, at a roast of Rose held at Hollywood Casino Lawrenceburg in Indiana on the 25th anniversary of his 4,192nd hit and attended by many teammates, Rose wept while acknowledging he had "disrespected baseball". He apologized to Pérez and other members of the Big Red Machine, stating, "I guarantee everyone in this room I will never disrespect you again. I love the fans, I love the game of baseball, and I love Cincinnati baseball". His words and crying surprised those present; a Cincinnati Enquirer reporter said, "It felt completely unscripted, completely sincere, and very powerful. I had covered Rose for more than 25 years and hadn't ever heard him like that."

In June 2015, ESPN concluded its own investigation of Rose and determined that he had bet on baseball while still a player–manager. The results of the investigation were made public, revealing the records of bets made by Rose. Federal authorities had seized the records from one of Rose's associates.

=== WWE ===
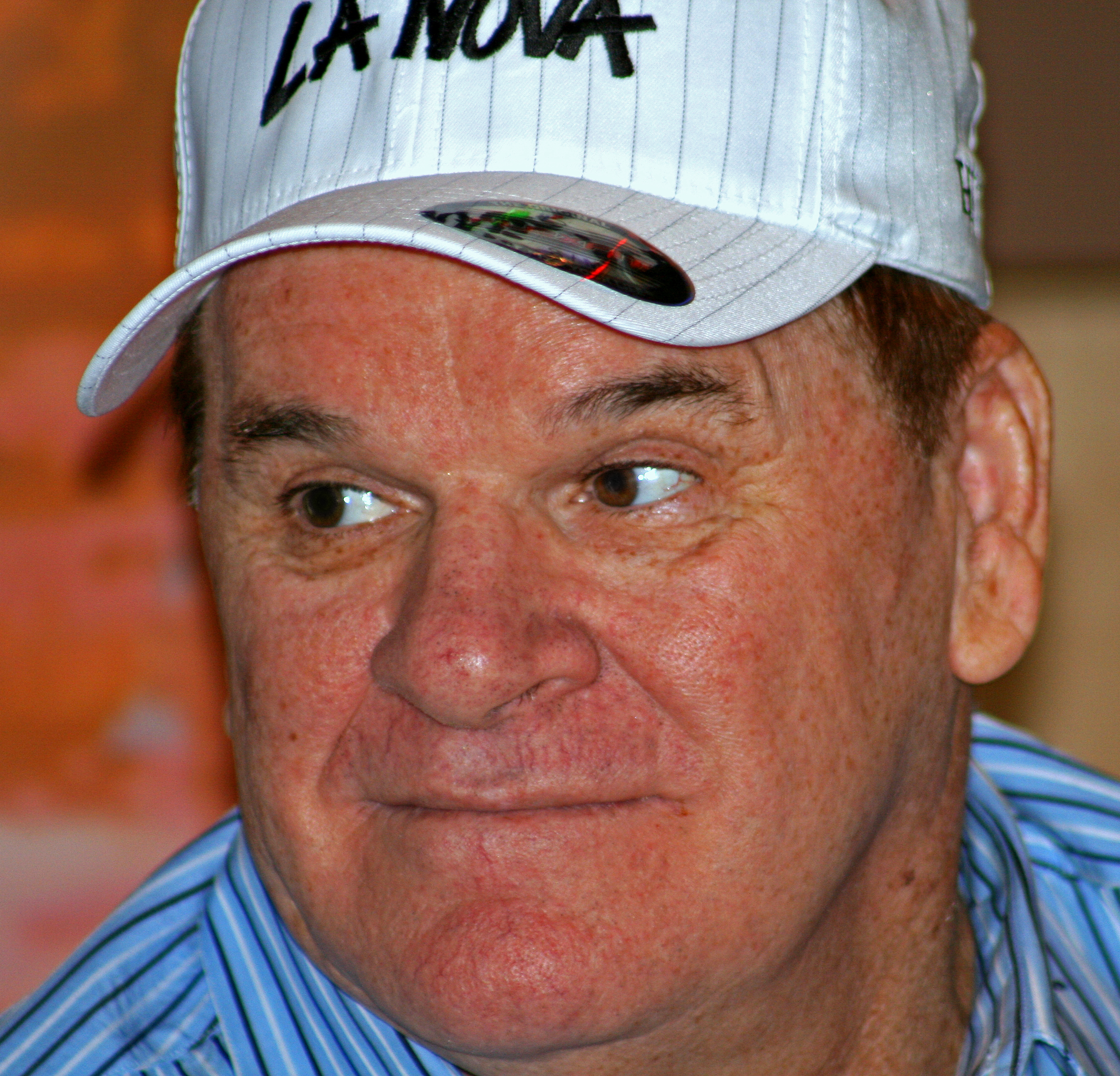
Rose in 2008

Between 1998 and 2000, Rose appeared at World Wrestling Federation's (now WWE) annual WrestleMania pay-per-view event, in what became a running gag. At WrestleMania XIV, he served as "guest ring announcer" prior to a match between Kane and the Undertaker. Rose took to the ring and started to taunt the Boston crowd about the Reds beating the Red Sox in the 1975 World Series, before he took a Tombstone Piledriver from Kane (also nicknamed "The Big Red Machine"). Though portrayed as a villain, Kane was cheered by the crowd. For the next year's WrestleMania XV, Rose was portrayed as seeking revenge. To do so, he dressed as the San Diego Chicken and "attacked" Kane before his scheduled match, only to take another Tombstone. He returned for a third time the following year, at WrestleMania 2000, but again was thwarted by Kane, as well as Rikishi, his tag-team partner that night.

In addition to these three appearances, Rose appeared in a Halloween-themed commercial for WWE's No Mercy event in 2002 and was chokeslammed by Kane. In 2004, Rose was inducted into the "Celebrity Wing" of the WWE Hall of Fame class of 2004. He was the first celebrity to go into the Hall, and was inducted at a ceremony prior to WrestleMania XX by Kane.

On March 22, 2010, Rose was the guest host on WWE Raw, which was the last episode of Raw before WrestleMania XXVI. As his first order of business, he set up a match between Shawn Michaels and Kane, which Michaels won. Later that night, Kane attacked Rose offscreen.

Rose was briefly mentioned on WWE television again on August 27, 2012. In an anger-management segment, Kane stated, "For reasons never quite explained, I have an unhealthy obsession with torturing Pete Rose." Rose was later interviewed on WWE.com about his experiences with Kane's anger.

=== Brief managing stint ===
On June 16, 2014, Rose returned to managing a professional baseball team for one game, serving as guest manager of the Bridgeport Bluefish, a Connecticut-based team. Rose's cameo as a manager did not violate his lifetime ban, as the Bluefish played in the independent Atlantic League of Professional Baseball, which is unaffiliated with MLB. Rose also coached first base and signed autographs for fans as the Bluefish defeated the Lancaster Barnstormers, 2–0.

=== Fox Sports ===
On April 16, 2015, Rose was announced to have been hired by Fox Sports to serve as a guest studio color analyst for MLB coverage on Fox and Fox Sports 1, appearing on the MLB on Fox pregame show, as well as MLB Whiparound, America's Pregame, and Fox Sports Live. He made his Fox Sports 1 debut on May 11, 2015. He was let go in August 2017 when the details of his sexual relationship with a teenager in the 1970s was revealed after he attempted to sue John Dowd.

=== Autograph shows ===
Rose became a fixture at baseball card and autograph shows. As of March 2014, Rose reportedly earned more than $1,000,000 annually from many paid public appearances and autograph signings. These included appearances in Cooperstown, New York, around the time of the Hall of Fame induction weekend each year. Although Rose did not stay at the Otesaga Resort Hotel with other baseball people and could not attend the ceremonies, many fans gathered outside for his autograph. He became known for signing baseballs with the phrase "I'm sorry I bet on baseball", and if paid to, would sign anything, including his mugshot after being arrested for tax evasion and copies of the Dowd report. He was known to spend over 20 hours a week greeting fans and signing autographs at casinos in Las Vegas.

== Personal life ==
=== Relationships and children ===
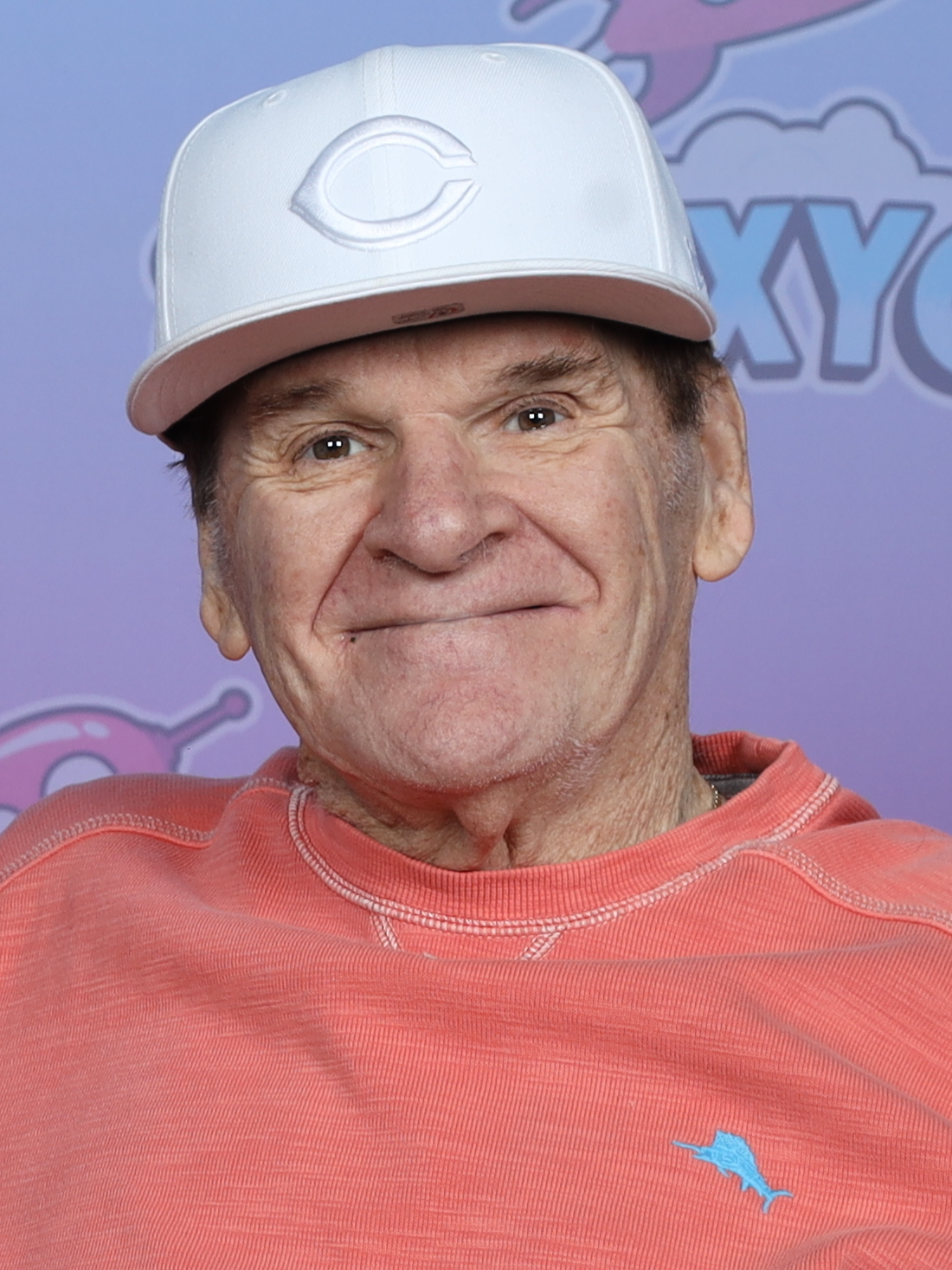
Rose in 2023

Rose married Karolyn Englehardt on January 25, 1964. The couple had two children, daughter Fawn (born 1964) and son Pete Rose Jr. (born 1969) who played in the minor leagues and had a brief major league appearance. The marriage ended in divorce in 1980. In 1978, a paternity suit was filed naming Rose as the father of Morgan Erin Rubio. In a 1996 settlement of the lawsuit, Rose acknowledged that Rubio was his daughter.

Rose married his second wife, Carol J. Woliung, a former Playboy Bunny and Philadelphia Eagles cheerleader, in 1984. They had two children, son Tyler (born 1984) and daughter Cara (born 1989), who was born two days before Rose's banishment from MLB. Rose filed for divorce from Carol in March 2011, citing irreconcilable differences, but his petition did not offer any additional details. Rose did not include a date for their separation. Documents in the filing said that Rose was looking to obtain all memorabilia and other possessions he had acquired before the marriage.

While separated from his second wife, Rose began a relationship with Kiana Kim, a Playboy model 40 years his junior. During a 2009 interview, Rose discussed this relationship, stating, "My girl has finally decided to try to shoot for Playboy, and they were kind enough to give her an opportunity to come to Houston for an interview, and we're excited about that." A 2013 reality show called Pete Rose: Hits & Mrs., which followed the couple and his two stepchildren Cassie and Ashton, premiered on TLC on January 14, 2013. Rose and Kim had been engaged since 2011, but never married. They appeared on a national Skechers commercial which aired during Super Bowl XLVIII.

Two of Rose's children have lived public lives. Cara has worked as a television actress, appearing as a regular in the first season of the NBC soap opera Passions and playing a recurring role on Fox's Melrose Place. She uses the stage name "Chea Courtney". His son, Pete Jr., spent 16 years as a minor league player, advancing to the majors once for an 11-game stint with the Reds in 1997, and later moving into coaching. Rose's minor league roommate, David Miller, recruited Pete Jr.'s son Peter Edward Rose III (PJ) to a national letter of intent for the 2026 season for the La Salle Explorers. PJ Rose played two games for the Explorers in 2026, their first season since the program was dropped in 2020.

=== Statutory rape allegation ===
Rose filed a defamation suit against John M. Dowd in July 2016, after Dowd had alleged in a radio interview the previous summer that Rose committed statutory rape. A motion filed in Dowd's defense contained a sworn statement from a woman who said that Rose had engaged in a sexual relationship with her in the 1970s, when she was a minor and he was in his mid-30s. Rose later acknowledged the relationship, defending himself by saying that he did not know that the girl, between 14 and 15 years old at the time, was a minor under Ohio state laws and that he did not have sex with her outside the state. Rose claimed he thought she was 16, which was the age of consent in Ohio at the time. In light of the allegation, the Phillies canceled his upcoming Philadelphia Baseball Wall of Fame ceremony. On December 15, 2017, a judge dismissed the suit when both parties reached an agreement. When questioned about it by Alex Coffey, a female reporter from The Philadelphia Inquirer, in August 2022, Rose replied, "It was 55 years ago, babe."

=== Death ===
Rose died at his home in Las Vegas, Nevada, on September 30, 2024, at the age of 83, from hypertensive and atherosclerotic cardiovascular disease. He had attended an autograph event in Franklin, Tennessee, the day prior. On February 10, 2025, after gaining permission from Manfred, the Reds announced that they would add #14 patches to their uniforms throughout the entire season in Rose's memory.

== Records and achievements ==
Aside from the numerous records he set and individual titles he won, Rose was also honored with the 1968 Hutch Award, the 1969 Lou Gehrig Memorial Award, and the 1976 Roberto Clemente Award. Despite his status of permanent ineligibility for the Hall of Fame, Rose received 9.5% of the votes (17th place overall) in his first year on the ballot for the BBWAA. He continued to receive votes for the next two years, but failed to achieve the minimum of 5% to keep him on the ballot. Rose was inducted into the Baseball Reliquary's Shrine of the Eternals in 2010.

Rose's statue at Great American Ball Park

In 2017, The Cincinnati Reds dedicated a bronze statue of Rose at the entrance of Great American Ball Park. His statue joins four other Crosley Field Era Reds: Joe Nuxhall, Ted Kluszewski, Frank Robinson, and Ernie Lombardi. Rose's larger-than-life statue bronze statue by Tom Tsuchiya shows him doing his iconic head first slide.

Rose made the National League All-Star roster 17 times. Only three NL players (Hank Aaron, Willie Mays, and Stan Musial) and six American League (AL) players (Mickey Mantle, Brooks Robinson, Cal Ripken, Ted Williams, Rod Carew, and Carl Yastrzemski) have more appearances. He was voted the NL's Most Valuable Player in 1973, but also finished in the top-five vote-getters in 1968, 1969, 1975, and 1976. He led the league in batting average three times (1968, 1969, 1973), in plate appearances and hits seven times, in games played and doubles five times, in at-bats and runs scored four times, and in on-base percentage twice (1968, 1979).

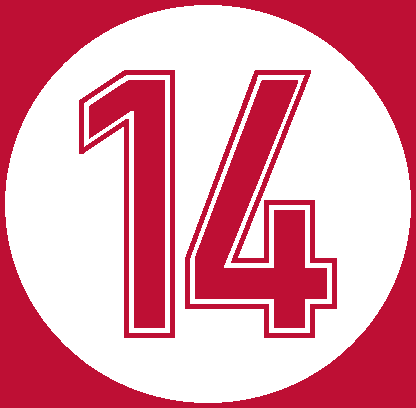
Pete Rose's number 14 was retired by the Cincinnati Reds in 2016.

- Major League records:
  - Most career at-bats – 14,053
  - Most career plate appearances – 15,890
  - Most career hits – 4,256
  - Most career singles – 3,215
  - Most career times on base – 5,929
  - Most career outs – 10,328
  - Most career games played – 3,562
  - Most career winning games played – 1,972
  - Only player to play at least 500 games at five different positions – 1B (939), LF (671), 3B (634), 2B (628), RF (595)
  - Most seasons of 200 or more hits – 10 (tied with Ichiro Suzuki)
  - Most consecutive seasons of 100 or more hits – 23
  - Most consecutive seasons with 600 or more at-bats – 13 (1968–1980) (shared)
  - Most seasons with 600 at-bats – 17
  - Most seasons with 150 or more games played – 17
  - Most seasons with 100 or more games played – 23
- National League records:
  - Most consecutive years played – 24
  - Most career runs – 2,165
  - Most career doubles – 746
  - Most career games with 5 or more hits – 10
  - Modern (post-1900) NL record for longest consecutive-game hitting streak NL – 44
  - Modern record for most hitting streaks of 20 or more consecutive games – 7

Rose also accumulated 63 four-hit games in his MLB career.

Rose retired in 1986 with the highest modern-day career fielding percentage for a right fielder at 99.14% and the highest National League modern-day career fielding percentage for a left fielder at 99.07%, behind only the AL's Joe Rudi and then-active players Gary Roenicke and Brian Downing, who also primarily played in the AL.

== Managerial record ==
Team	Year	Regular season					Postseason			
Team	Year	Games	Won	Lost	Win %	Finish	Won	Lost	Win %	Result
CIN	1984	41	19	22	.463	5th in NL West	–	–	–	
CIN	1985	162	89	72	.552	2nd in NL West	–	–	–	
CIN	1986	162	86	76	.531	2nd in NL West	–	–	–	
CIN	1987	162	84	78	.519	2nd in NL West	–	–	–	
CIN	1988	23	11	12	.478	2nd in NL West	–	–	–	
CIN	1988	111	64	47	.577	2nd in NL West	–	–	–	
CIN	1989	125	59	66	.472	Permanently banned from baseball	–	–	–	
CIN total		786	412	373	.525		0	0	–	
Total		786	412	373	.525		0	0	–	

== In popular culture ==
In 1985, pop-artist Andy Warhol produced a limited edition screenprint in which Rose was the subject. The work was released in a signed numbered edition of 50.

Rose was referenced in the lyrics of the song "Zanzibar" originally released by Billy Joel in 1978 on the 52nd Street album: "Rose, he knows he's such a credit to the game / But the Yankees grab the headlines every time." In later live performances instead of singing of Rose being "a credit to the game," Joel jokes that he will "never make the Hall of Fame," although he modified this to "Hall of Popularity" during a concert in Cincinnati.

In the sport of wakeboarding, a trick is named "Pete Rose" because riders attempting to learn it would "slide like Pete Rose" when crashing.

In the American television show Law & Order, after Carey Lowell's character compared learning disappointing truth about a heroic Naval aviator to “finding out Amelia Earhart flew to Bakersfield and hid out for 50 years”, Sam Waterston’s character replied that he “got over Pete Rose.” In the American television show The Sopranos, Steve Buscemi's character Tony Blundetto refers to himself as Charlie Hustle. In the American television show, Better Call Saul, Jimmy McGill is also repeatedly referred to as "Charlie Hustle".

Pete Rose was also mentioned in the American television show, Airwolf, by Ernest Borgnine's character Dominic Santini who exclaimed that Pete Rose would "live forever".

The song "Cleveland" by Luke Doucet and the White Falcon, on the 2008 Blood's Too Rich album, refers to Rose and his supporters, and a time when Doucet and Rose shared an elevator.

== See also ==
- DHL Hometown Heroes
- Major League Baseball titles leaders
- Major League Baseball consecutive games played streaks
- List of Major League Baseball annual runs scored leaders
- List of Major League Baseball annual doubles leaders
- List of Major League Baseball batting champions
- List of Major League Baseball career at bat leaders
- List of Major League Baseball career plate appearance leaders
- List of Major League Baseball career games played leaders
- List of Major League Baseball career hits leaders
- List of Major League Baseball career hit by pitch leaders
- List of Major League Baseball career singles leaders
- List of Major League Baseball career doubles leaders
- List of Major League Baseball career triples leaders
- List of Major League Baseball career runs scored leaders
- List of Major League Baseball career runs batted in leaders
- List of Major League Baseball career stolen bases leaders
- List of Major League Baseball career total bases leaders
- List of Major League Baseball player-managers
- List of people banned from Major League Baseball

Awards and achievements
Preceded by Vern Law & Willie Stargell; Mike Shannon; Bob Gibson; Greg Luzinski	Major League Player of the Month; July 1965; August 1966; August 1968; July 1973	Succeeded by Willie Mays; Roberto Clemente; Steve Blass; Davey Johnson
Preceded by Dave Winfield; Keith Hernandez	National League Player of the Month; July 1978; September 1979	Succeeded by Dave Parker; Dave Kingman
