= My Prison Without Bars =

Autobiography of Pete Rose

- Author: Pete Rose; Richard Hill
- Publisher: Rodale, Inc.
- Publication date: January 8, 2004
- Publication place: United States
- Media type: Hardback
- Pages: 322
- ISBN: 9781579549275

My Prison Without Bars is an autobiography by baseball player Pete Rose which was co-written with author Richard Hill. It was published by Rodale Press in Emmaus, Pennsylvania on January 8, 2004 and became a New York Times bestseller.

In the book, Rose finally admitted publicly to betting on baseball games and other sports while playing for and managing the Cincinnati Reds. He also admitted to betting on Reds games, but said that he never bet against the Reds.
