= List of action films of the 1970s =

This is chronological list of action films released in the 1970s. Often there may be considerable overlap particularly between action and other genres (including horror, comedy and science fiction films); the list should attempt to document films which are more closely related to action, even if they blend genres.

Title	Director	Cast	Country	Subgenre/notes
1970
Airport	George Seaton	Burt Lancaster, Dean Martin, Jean Seberg	United States	
Alleycat Rock: Female Boss	Yasuharu Hasebe	Akiko Wada, Meiko Kaji, Kōji Wada	Japan	Action thriller
Brothers Five	Lo Wei	Cheng Pei-pei, Chin Han, Chang Yi	Hong Kong	Martial arts film
The Chinese Boxer	Jimmy Wang Yu	Jimmy Wang Yu, Lo Lieh, Wang Ping	Hong Kong	Martial arts film
Cold Blade	Yuen Chor		Hong Kong	
Cold Sweat	Terence Young	Charles Bronson, Liv Ullmann, Jill Ireland	France; Italy	Action thriller
Cotton Comes to Harlem	Ossie Davis	Godfrey Cambridge, Raymond St. Jacques, Calvin Lockhart	United States	Action comedy
The Heroic Ones	Chang Cheh	David Chiang, Chin Han, Ti Lung	Hong Kong	Martial arts film
King Eagle	Chang Cheh	Ti Lung, Li Ching, Yuen Woo-ping	Hong Kong	Martial arts film
Nam's Angels	Jack Starrett	William Smith, Bernie Hamilton, Huston Savage	United States	
A Taste of Cold Steel	Feng Yueh	Chang Yi, Essie Lin Chia, Chan Hung-lit, Ku Feng, Wu Ma, Sammo Hung	Hong Kong	Martial arts film
Vengeance	Chang Cheh	David Chiang, Ti Lung	Hong Kong	Martial arts film
The Wandering Swordsman	Chang Cheh	David Chiang, Lily Li, Wu Ma, Bolo Yeung	Hong Kong	Martial arts film
1971
The Ammunition Hunters	Fung Chi Kong	Chen Chen	Hong Kong	
The Anonymous Heroes	Chang Cheh	David Chiang, Ti Lung, Ku Feng	Hong Kong	Action comedy
The Big Boss	Lo Wei	Bruce Lee, Maria Yi	Hong Kong	Martial arts film
Blood of the Dragon	Kao Pao-shu	Jimmy Wang Yu, Lung Fei, Chiao Chiao	Hong Kong	Martial arts film
The Deadly Duo	Chang Cheh	David Chiang, Ti Lung, Ku Feng	Hong Kong	Martial arts film
Diamonds Are Forever	Guy Hamilton	Sean Connery, Jill St. John, Charles Gray	United Kingdom	
Dirty Harry	Don Siegel	Clint Eastwood, Andy Robinson, Harry Guardino, Reni Santoni	United States	Action thriller
Duel	Steven Spielberg	Dennis Weaver, Carey Loftin, Eddie Firestone	United States	Television film
The Duel	Chang Cheh	David Chiang, Ti Lung, Wang Ping	Hong Kong	Martial arts film
Duel of Fists	Chang Cheh	David Chiang, Ti Lung	Hong Kong	Martial arts film
The French Connection	William Friedkin	Gene Hackman, Fernando Rey, Roy Scheider	United States	Action thriller
Le Mans	Lee H. Katzin	Steve McQueen, Siegfried Rauch, Elga Andersen	United States	
The New One-Armed Swordsman	Chang Cheh	David Chiang, Ti Lung, Lee Ching	Hong Kong	Martial arts film
The Omega Man	Boris Sagal	Charlton Heston, Anthony Zerbe, Rosalind Cash	United States	Science fiction action
The Shadow Whip	Lo Wei	Cheng Pei-pei, Hua Yueh, Li Jen Ho	Hong Kong	Martial arts film
Shaft	Gordon Parks	Richard Roundtree, Moses Gunn, Gwen Mitchell	United States	
Sweet Sweetback's Baadasssss Song	Melvin Van Peebles	Melvin Van Peebles, Simon Chuckster, Hubert Scales	United States	Action thriller
THX 1138	George Lucas	Robert Duvall, Donald Pleasence, Maggie McOmie	United States	Science fiction action
Vanishing Point	Richard C. Sarafian	Barry Newman, Cleavon Little, Dean Jagger,	United States	Action thriller
The Water Margin	Chang Cheh	David Chiang, Tetsurō Tamba	Hong Kong	Martial arts film
1972
The 14 Amazons	Gang Cheng	Lisa Lu, Ivy Ling Po, Chen Yen-yen	Hong Kong	
Angry Guest	Chang Cheh	David Chiang, Ti Lung, Ching Li	Hong Kong	Martial arts film
Boxer From Shantung	Chang Cheh	David Chiang	Hong Kong	Martial arts film
Delightful Forest	Chang Cheh	Ti Lung, Chiang Nan, Kong Ling	Hong Kong	Martial arts film
Female Convict Scorpion: Jailhouse 41	Shunya Ito	Meiko Kaji, Kayoko Shiraishi, Fumio Watanabe	Japan	Action thriller
Fist of Fury	Lo Wei	Bruce Lee, Nora Miao, Tien Feng, James Tien, Lo Wei	Hong Kong	Martial arts film
Five Fingers of Death	Cheng Chang Ho	Lo Lieh, Chao Hsiung, Wang Ching-Feng	Hong Kong	Martial arts film
Four Riders	Chang Cheh	David Chiang, Ti Lung	Hong Kong	Martial arts film
Fuzz	Richard A. Colla	Burt Reynolds, Raquel Welch, Yul Brynner	United States	Action comedy
The Getaway	Sam Peckinpah	Steve McQueen, Ali MacGraw, Ben Johnson	United States	Action thriller
The Legend of Nigger Charley	Martin Goldman	Thomas Anderson, Don Pedro Colley, Jerry Gatlin	United States	
Man of Iron	Chang Cheh	Chen Kuan-tai, Ching Li, Wong Chung	Hong Kong	
One Armed Boxer	Jimmy Wang Yu	Jimmy Wang Yu, Jackie Chan	China	Martial arts film
The Outside Man	Jacques Deray	Jean-Louis Trintignant, Ann-Margret, Roy Scheider	France; Italy	Action thriller
The Poseidon Adventure	Ronald Neame, Irwin Allen	Gene Hackman	United States	
Shaft's Big Score	Gordon Parks	Richard Roundtree, Moses Gunn, Drew Bundi Brown	United States	
Slaughter	Jack Starrett	Jim Brown, Rip Torn, Norman Alfe	United States	Action thriller
Way of the Dragon	Bruce Lee	Bruce Lee, Nora Miao, Chuck Norris	Hong Kong	Martial arts film
1973
The Black Six	Matt Cimber	Gene Washington, Mercury Morris, Willie Lanier	United States	
The Blood Brothers	Chang Cheh	David Chiang, Ti Lung, Ching Li	Hong Kong	Martial arts film
Charley Varrick	Don Siegel	Walter Matthau, Andy Robinson, Joe Don Baker,	United States	Action thriller
Cleopatra Jones	Jack Starrett	Tamara Dobson, Bernie Casey, Brenda Sykes	United States	
Coffy	Jack Hill	Pam Grier, Booker Bradshaw, Robert DoQui	United States	
The Crazies	George A. Romero	Edith Bell, Lane Carroll, Will Disney	United States	Action thriller
Detroit 9000	Arthur Marks	Rudy Challenger, Scatman Crothers, Ella Edwards	United States	Action thriller
Electra Glide in Blue	James William Guercio	Robert Blake, Billy "Green" Bush, Mitchell Ryan	United States	
Enter the Dragon	Robert Clouse	Bruce Lee, John Saxon, Jim Kelly	United States	Martial arts film
The Flash Legs	Wu Ma	Tan Tao-liang, Lo Lieh, Ouyang Sha-fei	Hong Kong	Martial arts film
Hell Up in Harlem	Larry Cohen, Janelle Cohen	Fred Williamson, Julius Harris, Gloria Hendry	United States	Action thriller
Hit!	Sidney J. Furie	Billy Dee Williams, Richard Pryor, Paul Hampton	United States	
Le Magnifique	Philippe de Broca	Jean-Paul Belmondo, Jacqueline Bisset, Vittorio Caprioli	France; Italy	
Milano Rovente	Umberto Lenzi	Antonio Sabàto, Sr., Marisa Mell	Italy	Action thriller
Japan Sinks	Shiro Moritani, Ayumi Ishida, Keiju Kobayashi	Hiroshi Fujioka	Japan	
Live and Let Die	Guy Hamilton	Roger Moore, Yaphet Kotto, Jane Seymour	United Kingdom	Action thriller
The Mackintosh Man	John Huston	Paul Newman, Dominique Sanda, James Mason	United Kingdom	Action thriller
Magnum Force	Ted Post	Clint Eastwood, Hal Holbrook, David Soul	United States	Action thriller
The No Mercy Man	Daniel Vance	Steve Sandor, Rockne Tarkington, Sid Haig	United States	Action thriller
The Pirate	Chang Cheh	Ti Lung, David Chiang, Dean Shek	Hong Kong	Martial arts film
Savage!	Cirio Santiago	Aura Aurea, Vic Diaz, Lada Edmund	Philippines	
Shaft in Africa	John Guillermin	Richard Roundtree, Frank Finlay, Vonetta McGee	United States	Action thriller
Slaughter's Big Rip-Off	Gordon Douglas	Jim Brown, Ed McMahon	United States	Action thriller
The Spook Who Sat By the Door	Ivan Dixon	Lawrence Cook	United States	
The Stone Killer	Michael Winner	Charles Bronson, Martin Balsam, David Sheiner, Norman Fell, Ralph Waite, Paul Koslo, Stuart Margolin, Jack Colvin, John Ritter	United States	
That Man Bolt	Henry Levin, David Lowell Rich	Ken Kazama, Fred Williamson, Byron Webster	United States	Martial arts film
Westworld	Michael Crichton	Yul Brynner, Richard Benjamin, James Brolin	United States	Science fiction action
White Lightning	Joseph Sargent	Burt Reynolds, Jennifer Billingsley, Ned Beatty	United States	Action thriller
1974
99 and 44/100% Dead	John Frankenheimer	Richard Harris, Edmond O'Brien, Bradford Dillman	United States	
Airport 1975	Jack Smight	Charlton Heston, Karen Black, George Kennedy	United States	Disaster film
Bamboo Gods and Iron Men	Cesar Gallardo, Cirio Santiago	Shirley Washington	Philippines	Martial arts film
Black Belt Jones	Robert Clouse	Jim Kelly, Gloria Hendry, Scatman Crothers	United States	Martial arts film
The Black Godfather	John Evans	Don Chastain, Damu King	United States	
Bring Me the Head of Alfredo Garcia	Sam Peckinpah	Warren Oates, Isela Vega, Robert Webber, Gig Young, Helmut Dantine, Emilio Fernández, Kris Kristofferson, Donnie Fritts	United States	Action thriller
Busting	Peter Hyams	Elliott Gould, Robert Blake, Allen Garfield	United States	
Captain Kronos - Vampire Hunter	Brian Clemens	Horst Janson, John Carson, Shane Briant	United States	
Dirty Mary, Crazy Larry	John Hough	Peter Fonda, Susan George, Adam Roarke	United States	
Earthquake	Mark Robson	Charlton Heston, Ava Gardner, George Kennedy	United States	Disaster film
Emergency Squad	Stelvio Massi	Tomas Milian, Gastone Moschin, Raymond Lovelock	Italy	Action thriller
The Executioner	Teruo Ishii	Sonny Chiba, Makoto Satō, Yasuaki Kurata, Shozo Saijo	Japan	Martial arts film
Executioner 2: The Karate Inferno	Teruo Ishii	Sonny Chiba, Makoto Satō, Eiji Go	Japan	Action comedy, martial arts film
Five Shaolin Masters	Chang Cheh	David Chiang, Ti Lung, Alexander Fu Sheng	Hong Kong	Martial arts film
Freebie and the Bean	Richard Rush	James Caan, Alan Arkin, Loretta Swit,	United States	Action comedy
Gone in 60 Seconds	H.B. Halicki	Hal McClain, Markos Kotsikos, Jonathan E. Fricke	United States	Action thriller
Heroes Two	Chang Cheh	Alexander Fu Sheng, Chen Kuan-tai	Hong Kong	Martial arts film
Juggernaut	Richard Lester	Richard Harris, Omar Sharif, David Hemmings	United Kingdom	Action thriller
The Man with the Golden Gun	Guy Hamilton	Roger Moore, Christopher Lee, Britt Ekland	United Kingdom	Action thriller
Mr. Majestyk	Richard Fleischer	Charles Bronson, Al Lettieri, Linda Cristal	United States	Action thriller
Policewomen	Lee Frost	Jeanie Bell, Wes Bishop, Sondra Currie	United States	
The Savage Five	Chang Cheh	David Chiang, Ti Lung, Chen Kuan-tai	Hong Kong	Martial arts film
Sister Street Fighter	Kazuhiko Yamaguchi	Sue Shiomi, Sonny Chiba	Japan	
Stone	Sandy Harbutt	Ken Shorter, Sandy Harbutt	Australia	
The Stranger and the Gunfighter	Antonio Margheriti	Lee Van Cleef, Lo Lieh, Julian Ugarte	Italy; Spain; France; Hong Kong	Martial arts film
The Street Fighter	Shigehiro Ozawa	Sonny Chiba, Gerald Yamada, Tony Cetera	Japan	Martial arts film
Street Law	Enzo G. Castellari	Franco Nero	Italy	Action thriller
The Super Cops	Gordon Parks	Ron Leibman, David Selby, Sheila Frazier	United States	
The Taking of Pelham One Two Three	Joseph Sargent	Walter Matthau, Robert Shaw, Martin Balsam	United States	Action thriller
TNT Jackson	Cirio Santiago	Jeanie Bell, Stan Shaw, Pat Anderson	Philippines	Action thriller
The Towering Inferno	Irwin Allen, John Guillermin	Paul Newman, Steve McQueen, William Holden,	United States	
Truck Turner	Jonathan Kaplan	Isaac Hayes, Yaphet Kotto	United States	Action thriller
1975
All Men Are Brothers	Chang Cheh	David Chiang, Ti Lung, Bolo Yeung	Hong Kong	Martial arts film
The Black Gestapo	Lee Frost	Rod Perry, Charles P. Robinson, Phil Hoover	United States	Action thriller
Boss Nigger	Jack Arnold	Fred Williamson, William Smith, Elizabeth Saxon	United States	Action thriller
Brannigan	Douglas Hickox	John Wayne, Richard Attenborough, Judy Geeson	United Kingdom	Action thriller
Breakout	Tom Gries	Charles Bronson, Robert Duvall	United States	Action thriller
Bucktown	Arthur Marks	Fred Williamson, Pam Grier, Thalmus Rasulala	United States	
The Candy Tangerine Man	Matt Climber	John Daniels, Eli Haines, Tom Hankason	United States	Blaxploitation
Champion of Death	Kazuhiko Yamaguchi	Sonny Chiba	Japan	Martial arts film
Cleopatra Jones and the Casino of Gold	Chuck Bail	Tamara Dobson, Magali Noël, Janet Agren	Hong Kong; United States	
Cover Girl Models	Cirio Santiago	Pat Anderson, Lindsay Bloom, Rhonda Leigh Hopkins	United States; Philippines	
Death Race 2000	Paul Bartel	David Carradine, Simone Griffeth, Sylvester Stallone	United States	Science fiction action
Disciples of Shaolin	Chang Cheh	Alexander Fu Sheng, Kuan-Chun Chi, Ming Li Chen	Hong Kong	Martial arts film
Dolemite	D'Urville Martin	D'Urville Martin, Rudy Ray Moore, Lady Reed	United States	Action comedy
The Eiger Sanction	Clint Eastwood	Clint Eastwood, George Kennedy	United States	Action thriller
Fear Over the City	Henri Verneuil	Jean-Paul Belmondo, Charles Denner, Adalberto Maria Merli	France; Italy	Action thriller
French Connection II	John Frankenheimer	Gene Hackman, Fernando Rey, Bernard Fresson, Philippe Léotard, Ed Lauter, Charles Millot, Jean-Pierre Castaldi, Cathleen Nesbitt	United States	Action thriller
Hard Times	Walter Hill	Charles Bronson, James Coburn, Jill Ireland	United States	
The Killing Machine	Noribumi Suzuki	Sonny Chiba	Japan	
L'Agression	Gérard Pirès	Jean-Louis Trintignant, Catherine Deneuve, Claude Brasseur	France; Italy	Action thriller
The Man from Hong Kong	Brian Trenchard-Smith	Jimmy Wang Yu, George Lazenby, Ros Spiers	Australia; Hong Kong	
Race with the Devil	Jack Starrett	Peter Fonda, Warren Oates, Loretta Swit	United States	
The Return of the Street Fighter	Shigehiro Ozawa	Sonny Chiba	Japan	
Rollerball	Norman Jewison	James Caan, John Houseman, Maud Adams	United States	Science fiction action
Sheba, Baby	William Girdler	Pam Grier, Austin Stoker	United States	
Sholay	Ramesh Sippy	Dharmendra, Sanjeev Kumar, Hema Malini	India	
The Super Inframan	Hua-Shan	Li Hsiu-hsien, Wang Hsieh, Lin Wen-wei	Hong Kong; Japan	Martial arts film
Syndicate Sadists	Umberto Lenzi	Tomas Milian, Joseph Cotten, Maria Fiore	Italy	
The Valiant Ones	King Hu	Pai Ying, Hsu Feng, Roy Chiao	Taiwan; Hong Kong	Martial arts film
White Line Fever	Jonathan Kaplan	Jan-Michael Vincent, Kay Lenz, Slim Pickens, Sam Laws, L.Q. Jones, Don Porter, R.G. Armstrong, Leigh French, Dick Miller, Martin Kove	Canada; United States	
Wildcat Women	Stephen Gibson	Joey Ginza, Yolanda Love	United States	
1976
7-Man Army	Chang Cheh	David Chiang, Ti Lung, Chen Kuan-Tai	Hong Kong	Martial arts film
Assault on Precinct 13	John Carpenter	Austin Stoker, Darwin Joston, Laurie Zimmer	United States	Action thriller
The Big Racket	Enzo G. Castellari	Fabio Testi, Vincent Gardenia, Renzo Palmer	Italy	
Black Samurai	Al Adamson	D'Urville Martin, Marilyn Joi, Jim Kelly	United States	Martial arts film
Black Shampoo	Greydon Clark	John R. Daniels, Tanya Boyd, Joe Ortiz	United States	Action thriller
Black Sister's Revenge	Jamaa Fanaka	Jerri Hayes, Ernest Williams II, Charles D. Brooks III	United States	
Boxer Rebellion	Chang Cheh	Li Hua Li, Sheng Fu, Ka-Yan Leung	Hong Kong; Taiwan	Martial arts Film
Brotherhood of Death	Bill Berry	Roy Jefferson, Mike Thomas, Haskell V. Anderson	United States	Action thriller
Bruce Lee Fights Back from the Grave	Lee Doo-yong	Bruce Lee	South Korea	Martial arts film
Cannonball	Paul Bartel	David Carradine, Bill McKinney, Veronica Hamel	Hong Kong; United States	
Colt 38 Special Squad	Massimo Dallamano, Luciano Ercoli	Marcel Bozzuffi, Carole Andre, Ivan Rassimov	Italy	Action thriller
Deathcheaters	Brian Trenchard-Smith	John Hargreaves, Grant Page, Margaret Gerard	Australia	
Ebony, Ivory, and Jade	Cirio Santiago	Dick Adair, Max Alvarado, Sylvia Anderson	Philippines	
The Enforcer	James Fargo	Clint Eastwood, Tyne Daly, Harry Guardino	United States	Action thriller
Gator	Burt Reynolds	Burt Reynolds, Jack Weston, Lauren Hutton	United States	Action thriller
Hand of Death	John Woo	Dorian Tan, James Tien, Jackie Chan, Sammo Hung	Hong Kong	Martial arts film
Hot Potato	Oscar Williams	Jim Kelly, George Memmoli, Geoffrey Binney	United States	Martial arts film
The Human Tornado	Cliff Roquemore	Rudy Ray Moore, Lady Reed, Jimmy Lynch	United States	Action comedy, martial arts film
Killer Clans	Chor Yuen	Chen Ping, Ku Feng, Lo Lieh	Hong Kong	Martial arts film
Logan's Run	Michael Anderson	Michael York, Richard Jordan, Jenny Agutter, Roscoe Lee Browne	United States	Science fiction action
Master of the Flying Guillotine	Jimmy Wang Yu	Jimmy Wang Yu, Kam Kong, Lung Kun Yee	Hong Kong	Martial arts films
The New Shaolin Boxers	Chang Cheh	Alexander Fu Sheng, Jenny Tseng, Hsia Hui Wu	Hong Kong	Martial arts film
The Next Man	Richard C. Sarafian	Sean Connery, Adolfo Celi	United States	Action thriller
The Shaolin Avengers	Chang Cheh	Alexander Fu Sheng, Kuan-Chun Chi, Yen Tsan Tang	Hong Kong	Martial arts film
Shaolin Temple	Chang Cheh	David Chiang, Ti Lung, Alexander Fu Sheng	Hong Kong	Martial arts film
Shaolin Wooden Men	Chan Jeung Wa	Jackie Chan, Chin Long, Kong Kim	Hong Kong	Martial arts film
Strange Shadows in an Empty Room	Alberto De Martino	Stuart Whitman, Carole Laure, Martin Landau	Italy; Canada	
Web of Death	Yuen Chor	Hua Yueh, Lieh Lo, Li Ching	Hong Kong	Martial arts film
1977
Airport '77	Jerry Jameson	Jack Lemmon, Lee Grant, Brenda Vaccaro	United States	Action thriller
Bare Knuckles	Don Edmonds	Robert Viharo, Sherry Jackson, Michael Heit	United States	Martial arts film
The Brave Archer	Chang Cheh	Alexander Fu Sheng, Ku Feng, Philip Kwok, Ti Lung	Hong Kong	Martial arts film
Breaker! Breaker!	Donald Hulette	Chuck Norris, George Murdock, Terry O'Connor,	United States	
Black Sunday	John Frankenheimer	Robert Shaw, Bruce Dern, Marthe Keller	United States	Action thriller
Chinatown Kid	Chang Cheh	Alexander Fu Sheng, Philip Kwok, Lo Mang	Hong Kong	Martial arts Film
Chinese Connection 2		Bruce Li, Lo Lieh	Hong Kong	
The Clones of Bruce Lee	Joseph Kong	Bruce Lai, Dragon Lee	South Korea; Hong Kong	Martial arts film
The Doberman Cop	Kinji Fukasaku	Sonny Chiba, Janet Hatta, Hiroki Matsukata	Japan	Action thriller, Martial arts film
Double Nickels	Jack Vacek	Jack Vacek, Ed Abrams, Patrice Schubert	United States	Action thriller
The Gauntlet	Clint Eastwood	Clint Eastwood, Sondra Locke, Pat Hingle,	United States	Action thriller
Golgo 13: Assignment Kowloon	Yukio Noda	Sonny Chiba, Etsuko Shihomi, Jerry Ito	Japan	Action thriller, Martial arts film
Grand Theft Auto	Ron Howard	Ron Howard, Nancy Morgan, Marion Ross	United States	Action comedy
The Heroin Busters	Enzo G. Castellari	Fabio Testi, David Hemmings, Joshua Sinclair	Italy	Action thriller
High Rolling in a Hot Corvette	Igor Auzins	Joseph Bottoms, Grigor Taylor, Judy Davis	Australia	Action comedy
Karate Bear Fighter	Kazuhiko Yamaguchi	Sonny Chiba	Japan	Martial arts film
Karate for Life	Kazuhiko Yamaguchi	Sonny Chiba	Japan	Martial arts film
L'Animal	Claude Zidi	Jean-Paul Belmondo, Raquel Welch, Charles Gérard	France	Action comedy
The Naval Commandos	Chang Cheh	David Chiang, Ti Lung, Alexander Fu Sheng, Philip Kwok, Lu Feng, Chiang Sheng	Hong Kong; Taiwan	
Operation Thunderbolt	Menahem Golan	Yehoram Gaon, Gila Almagor, Assi Dayan	Israel	Action thriller
Return of the Chinese Boxer	Jimmy Wang Yu	Jimmy Wang Yu, Fei Lung, Emily Y. Chang	Hong Kong	Martial arts film
Rollercoaster	James Goldstone	George Segal, Richard Widmark, Timothy Bottoms	United States	Action thriller
Rolling Thunder	John Flynn	Tommy Lee Jones, William Devane, Linda Haynes	United States	Action thriller
Smokey and the Bandit	Hal Needham	Burt Reynolds, Sally Field, Jerry Reed	United States	Action comedy
The Spy Who Loved Me	Lewis Gilbert	Roger Moore, Barbara Bach, Curd Jürgens	United Kingdom	Action thriller
Star Wars	George Lucas	Mark Hamill, Anthony Daniels, Harrison Ford	United States	Science fiction action
Telefon	Don Siegel	Charles Bronson, Lee Remick, Donald Pleasence	United States	Action thriller
To Kill with Intrigue	Lo Wei	Jackie Chan, Hsu Feng	Hong Kong	Martial arts film
1978
7 Grandmasters	Joseph Kuo	Jack Long, Li Yi Min	Hong Kong	
The 36th Chamber of Shaolin	Lau Kar-Leung	Gordon Lau, John Cheung	Hong Kong	Martial arts film
The Brave Archer 2	Chang Cheh	Alexander Fu Sheng, Ku Feng, Philip Kwok	Hong Kong	Martial arts Film
Crippled Avengers	Chang Cheh	Kuo Chui, Lu Feng, Lo Mang	Hong Kong	Martial arts film
Deathsport	Allan Arkush, Henry Suso	David Carradine, Claudia Jennings, Richard Lynch	United States	Science fiction action
Dirty Tiger, Crazy Frog		Sammo Hung	Hong Kong	Martial arts film
Drunken Master	Yuen Woo Ping	Jackie Chan	Hong Kong	Martial arts film, action comedy
Enter the Fat Dragon	Sammo Hung	Sammo Hung, Billy Chan	Hong Kong	Martial arts film, action comedy
Every Which Way but Loose	James Fargo	Clint Eastwood, Sondra Locke, Geoffrey Lewis	United States	
Five Deadly Venoms	Chang Cheh	Philip Kwok, Lo Mang, Ku Feng	Hong Kong	Martial arts Film
Game of Death	Robert Clouse	Bruce Lee, Gig Young, Dean Jagger	Hong Kong; United States	Action thriller, martial arts film
Good Guys Wear Black	Ted Post	Chuck Norris, Anne Archer, James Franciscus	United States	Action thriller
High-Ballin'	Peter Carter	Peter Fonda, Jerry Reed, Helen Shaver	Canada; United States	
Hooper	Hal Needham	Burt Reynolds, Sally Field, Jan-Michael Vincent	United States	Action comedy
The Inglorious Bastards	Enzo G. Castellari	Bo Svenson, Fred Williamson, Peter Hooten	Italy	Action thriller
Invincible Shaolin	Chang Cheh	Kuo Chui, Lo Mang, Lu Feng	Hong Kong	Martial arts film
Shogun's Samurai	Kinji Fukasaku	Sonny Chiba, Kinnosuke Nakamura, Etsuko Shihomi	Japan	Jidaigeki, martial arts film
Snake in the Eagle's Shadow	Yuen Woo Ping	Simon Yuen, Hwang Jang Lee, Jackie Chan	Hong Kong	Martial arts film
Snake & Crane Arts of Shaolin	Chen Chi Hwa	Jackie Chan, Nora Miao	Hong Kong	
Soul of the Sword	Shan Hua	Ti Lung, Chen Chi Lin, Feng Ku	Hong Kong	Martial arts film
Stunt Rock	Brian Trenchard-Smith	Margaret Gerard, Grant Page, Sorcery	Australia	Action thriller
Superman	Richard Donner	Marlon Brando, Gene Hackman, Christopher Reeve	United States	Superhero film
Warriors Two	Sammo Hung	Liang Chia-Je, Sammo Hung	Hong Kong	Martial arts film
1979
1941	Steven Spielberg	Dan Aykroyd, Ned Beatty, John Belushi	United States	Action comedy
Angels Revenge	Greydon Clark	Sylvia Anderson	United States	
Beyond the Poseidon Adventure	Irwin Allen	Michael Caine, Karl Malden, Sally Field	United States	
City on Fire	Alvin Rakoff	Barry Newman, Susan Clark, Shelley Winters	Canada	
Concorde Affaire '79	Ruggero Deodato	Joseph Cotten, Mimsy Farmer, James Franciscus	Italy	Action thriller
The Concorde ... Airport '79	David Lowell Rich	Alain Delon, Susan Blakely, Robert Wagner	United States	Action thriller
Dance of the Drunk Mantis	Yuen Woo Ping	Simon Yuen	Hong Kong	Action comedy, martial arts film
Day of the Assassin	Brian Trenchard-Smith, Carlos Vasallo	Chuck Connors	Mexico	
Disco Godfather	Rudy Ray Moore, J. Robert Wagone	Rudy Ray Moore, Carol Speed, Julius J. Carry III	United States	Martial arts film
Dragon Fist	Lo Wei	Jackie Chan, Nora Miao, James Tien	Hong Kong	Martial arts film
Escape from Alcatraz	Don Siegel	Clint Eastwood, Patrick McGoohan, Patrick McGoohan	United States	
A Force of One	Paul Aaron	Chuck Norris, Jennifer O'Neill, Clu Gulager	United States	Action thriller, martial arts film
Kid with the Golden Arm	Chang Cheh	Kuo Chui, Chiang Sheng, Lo Mang	Hong Kong	Martial arts film
Kung-Fu Commandos	Hsin Yi Chang	Yu-ching Chang, Ching Cheng, Tien-Chi Cheng	Taiwan	Martial arts film
Last Hurrah for Chivalry	John Woo	Damian Lau	Hong Kong	Martial arts film
Mad Max	George Miller	Mel Gibson, Joanne Samuel, Hugh Keays-Byrne	Australia	Science fiction action
Mad Monkey Kung Fu	Lau Kar-leung	Hsiao Ho, Lo Lieh, Kara Wai	Hong Kong	Martial arts Film
Magnificent Butcher	Yuen Woo Ping	Sammo Hung	Hong Kong	Martial arts film
Magnificent Ruffians	Chang Cheh	Philip Kwok, Chiang Sheng, Lo Mang	Hong Kong	Martial arts film
Moonraker	Lewis Gilbert	Roger Moore, Lois Chiles, Michael Lonsdale	United Kingdom; France	
Shaolin Daredevils	Chang Cheh	Philip Kwok, Lu Feng, Lo Mang, Chiang Sheng	Hong Kong	Martial arts film
Shaolin Rescuers	Chang Cheh	Lo Mang, Chiang Sheng, Kuo Chui	Hong Kong	
The Street Fighter's Last Revenge	Shigehiro Ozawa	Sonny Chiba, Bruce Li, Sue Shiomi	Japan	
Supersonic Man	Juan Piquer Simón	Antonio Cantafora, Cameron Mitchell, Diana Polakov	Spain	Superhero film
Ten Tigers from Kwangtung	Chang Cheh	Ti Lung, Alexander Fu Sheng, Dick Wei	Hong Kong	
The Warriors	Walter Hill	Michael Beck, James Remar, David Patrick Kelly	United States	Action thriller

== See also ==
- Action films
- Martial arts films
- Swashbuckler films
