= New Line Home Entertainment =

US home video company between 1990–2010

- Formerly: New Line Home Video (1991–2001)
- Industry: Home media
- Predecessors: Media Home Entertainment
- Founded: 1990; 36 years ago
- Defunct: 2010; 16 years ago
- Fate: Folded into Warner Home Video
- Successor: Warner Bros. Home Entertainment
- Headquarters: Los Angeles, California, U.S.
- Parent: New Line Cinema

New Line Home Entertainment (formerly known as New Line Home Video) was the home entertainment distribution arm of the film production studio of the same name, founded in 1990. It was responsible for the distribution of all New Line Cinema theatrical films for release on VHS, DVD and Blu-ray. The company also distributed some feature films from the specialty studio Picturehouse – formerly a New Line/HBO joint venture – as well as films or non-theatrical programs produced or acquired by New Line Home Entertainment and New Line Television.

According to New Line's website, Misery was the first New Line Home Video release.

In 2008, its parent company became a unit of Warner Bros. New Line Home Entertainment was eventually folded into Warner Home Video in 2010.

== History ==
In May 1991, New Line Cinema purchased the home video and foreign rights to films held by Nelson Entertainment (whose library included films inherited from Embassy Pictures) for $15 million, and thus obtained roughly 600 films. Shortly afterwards, New Line Cinema acquired the home video rights to the Nightmare on Elm Street franchise from Media Home Entertainment.

Before New Line Cinema formed its own video division, many of the company's films were released on home video by various distributors:

- Nelson Entertainment
- Warner Home Video (for Gizmo!, Fighting Black Kings and Betty Boop for President)
- MGM/CBS Home Video (for The Street Fighter and Return of the Street Fighter)
- Magnetic Video (for Léonor and Sympathy for the Devil, both through Viacom)
- Wizard Video (for Pink Flamingos, Female Trouble, Sister Street Fighter, and The Street Fighter's Last Revenge)
- HBO/Cannon Video (for Xtro, The Evil Dead, The First Time, The Exterminators of the Year 3000, Warriors of the Wasteland, Stunts and Polyester).
- Media Home Entertainment (for the first five Nightmare on Elm Street films, and The Hidden among others),
- LIVE Entertainment (for the first Teenage Mutant Ninja Turtles film (under the Family Home Entertainment label), Drop Dead Fred and Glengarry Glen Ross).

Later offerings came from RCA/Columbia Pictures Home Video and its successor, Columbia TriStar Home Video. When New Line Cinema formed their video division, RCA/Columbia and Columbia TriStar distributed VHS releases, while Image Entertainment released the films on Laserdisc. The New Line-Sony partnership ended in early 1995, when Turner Broadcasting System bought New Line Cinema and from 1995 to 1996, New Line Cinema's home video releases were distributed by Turner's video division, before eventually being turned over to Warner Home Video in 1996. Due to this arrangement, New Line Cinema's releases would advertise certain releases from Warner Bros. and vice versa.

On January 5, 2008, New Line Cinema announced, as did Warner Bros., that it would exclusively support Blu-ray for their films and drop support of HD DVD. The only HD DVD ever released by New Line Home Entertainment was Pan's Labyrinth.

New Line Cinema pursued a policy of regional lockout with its Blu-ray titles, which was in direct contrast to its corporate sibling Warner Home Video which left its Blu-ray titles region-free. After the studio was folded into Warner Bros., Warner discontinued this lockout policy with future New Line releases.

In 2008, after New Line Cinema was folded into Warner Bros., they parted ways with Canadian film distributor Alliance Films. Warner Home Video continued to use the New Line Home Entertainment logo for some time on Blu-ray and DVD releases of titles until the release of The Time Traveler's Wife (2009), after which New Line Home Entertainment was folded into Warner Home Video in 2010. Afterwards, new releases of future and catalog New Line Cinema titles would be released under the Warner Bros. Home Entertainment name.

As of 2025, the home video rights to New Line's library have been licensed over to Arrow Video.

== See also ==
- List of home video companies
- List of New Line Cinema films
- Infinifilm
