= Kenji Kazama =

Japanese martial artist and actor

- Born: Minoru Tsutsui; 1943 (age 82–83); Aichi Prefecture, Japan
- Other names: Ken Kazama; Fung Gaan Kin; Doryū Kazama
- Occupations: Martial arts instructor, actor, kickboxer, educator
- Martial arts career
- Style: Shorinji kempo, seidokaikan karate, kickboxing
- Teacher: Doshin So
Kenji Kazama
Japanese name
- Kanji: 風間健
- Hiragana: かざま けん
- Katakana: カザマ ケン
Transcriptions
- Romanization: Kazama Ken
Alternative Japanese name
- Kanji: 筒井稔
- Hiragana: つつい みのる
- Katakana: ツツイ ミノル
Transcriptions
- Romanization: Tsutsui Minoru

Minoru Tsutsui (Japanese: 筒井稔; born 1943), known as Ken Kazama (風間健) or Kenji Kazama, is a Japanese martial artist, actor, and former professional kickboxer.

== Biography ==
=== Martial arts ===
Kazama was born Minoru Tsutsui in Aichi Prefecture in 1943. He began studying Seidokaikan karate at the age of 17, and won the National Championship in 1961, later becoming an instructor. He cross-trained in several other martial arts, including bōjutsu, judo and kendo, as well as other traditional disciplines like Kenshibu, ikebana and sadō.

In 1963, he began studying Shorinji Kempo and enrolled in the Kongo Zen Sohonzan Shorinji Temple in Tadotsu, where he was given the bonze name Doryū Kazama (風間 道隆), and won the National Championship that year. He subsequently founded a Shorinji Kempo school in Nagoya. He also established Shorinji Kempo Clubs at the Aichi Gakuin University and the Chukyo Gakuin University.

In 1970, he helped found the Japan Action Club with Sonny Chiba. That same year, he began competing professionally in kickboxing, and won the Oriental Middleweight title in South Korea. He subsequently competed in Muay Thai in Thailand, and was the first Japanese fighter to compete at Lumpinee Boxing Stadium. In 1976, he won the World Full Contact Karate Middleweight Championship. He retired with a 38-0-5 record.

=== Acting ===
Kazuma made his film acting debut opposite Chiba in Yakuza Deka (1970). He subsequently appeared with Chiba in the cult classics The Street Fighter (1974) and Return of the Street Fighter (1976), as well as assisting with fight choreography.

He played a villain in the Fred Williamson vehicle That Man Bolt (1973). That same year he played the Japanese main villain Yokohama in When Taekwondo Strikes, for Hong Kong's Golden Harvest, which is notable for being the only acting role of "the Father of American Taekwondo" Jhoon Rhee.

In 1976 he had the lead role in another Hong Kong film called Karate From Shaolin Temple.

Also in the 70s, Kazama recorded a song, "Forever Bruce Lee" and released on a 45 RPM single, Tam YT-1081.

=== Other activities ===
In 1998, Kazama was appointed advisor to the Kokushikan University Martial Arts and Moral Education Research Institute. During the 2000s, he resided in Mongolia, where he was a visiting professor at Otgontenger University in Ulaanbaatar and an executive of the Japan-Mongolia Friendship Committee.

== Filmography ==
=== Film ===
Year	Title	Role	Notes #
1970	Yakuza Deka	Kazamaki	
1973	That Man Bolt	Spider	
1973	When Taekwondo Strikes	Yokohama	
1974	The Street Fighter	Senkaku Kan	Also fight choreographer
1974	Return of the Street Fighter	—N/a	Fight choreographer only
1976	Karate from Shaolin Temple	Musashi Yamanaka	
1978	Angel Guts	Yakuza	
1979	Sûpâ gun redei Wani Bunsho	Shimokawa	
1981	Station		
2004	Kill Devil		
2015	The Real Miyagi	Himself	Documentary

=== Television ===
Year	Title	Episode	Role	Notes
1978	Daitokai - Tatakai no hibi	#2.52		
