= Drifting Detective =

Drifting Detective may refer to:

- Drifting Detective: Tragedy in the Red Valley, a 1961 film directed by Kinji Fukasaku, starring Sonny Chiba.
- Drifting Detective: Black Wind in the Harbor, the follow-up to the above film, also directed by Kinji Fukasaku and starring Sonny Chiba.
