= Tatsuo Endo =

Tatsuo Endo may refer to:

- Tatsuo Endō (actor) (遠藤 太津朗, 1928–2012), Japanese actor
- Tatsuo Endo (engineer) (遠藤 達雄, 1925–1989), Japanese engineer
