= Doberman Cop (film) =

1977 film by Kinji Fukasaku

Doberman Deka
- Film poster
- Directed by: Kinji Fukasaku
- Written by: Kōji Takada
- Produced by: Norimichi Matsudaira; Kyō Namura
- Starring: Sonny Chiba
- Edited by: Isamu Ichida
- Music by: Kenjiro Hirose
- Distributed by: Toei Company (Japan)
- Release date: July 2, 1977 (Japan)
- Running time: 90 minutes
- Country: Japan
- Language: Japanese

Doberman Cop is a film version of the manga Doberman Deka released theatrically in Japan by Toei on July 2, 1977. The film was directed by Kinji Fukasaku and starred Sonny Chiba as Joji Kano (加納 錠治, Kanō Jōji).

== Plot ==
The burned and unidentifiable remains of a young woman are discovered in an apartment in Shinjuku, Tokyo. Objects in the apartment seem to indicate that the woman is named Mayumi Tamashiro, though the police believe this to be a pseudonym used by Yuna Tamashiro, a runaway from Ishigaki Island who has been missing for five years. Mayumi's former boyfriend, a motorcyclist named Chōei Mikawa who is also nicknamed "Hotshot", is originally a suspect but produces an alibi for the time of her murder. The police theorize that it must be the work of a serial murderer and arsonist.

Kano, a visiting policeman from Ishigaki Island, is unconvinced by the theory presented by the police and begins conducting his own invasion to find the real criminal. He speaks with Yuna's mother, a noro who predicts that Kano and Yuna will marry. A topless dancer named Kosode becomes infatuated with Kano and begins caring for his pet pig.

When Miki Haruno, an aspiring singer, is being held hostage by a crazed admirer near the top of a hotel, Kano uses ropes to rappel down the side of the building and break through a window to rescue her. That night he sees her perform at the Lido club, where one of the waiters tells him that the photo of Yuna does not look like his acquaintance Mayumi. Chōei Mikawa poses as a fan and tells her that he knows her secret and attempts to blackmail her but is caught by the club staff and beaten before he is saved by Kano. They find Miki passed out from drug use and Chōei tells Kano that until a few years ago she had been working at the same brothel in Kawasaki where Mayumi worked. He says that Miki Haruno is a persona created by her manager Hidemori, a yakuza from Osaka who put up money for her to get plastic surgery in the United States. Hidemori bribes Mr. Fujikawa, a judge on the show A Star Is Born, to choose Miki as the best performer over her main competition Kenji Mizuki, who is sleeping with Fujikawa.

Kano finds Miki and introduces himself as the boy who used to live next door to her in Ishigaki when she was known as Yuna, but Hidemori and his men grab him and beat him, then tie him up. Chōei's new girlfriend Miyoko is attacked by a masked man who breaks her neck before pouring gasoline on her and lighting it. Chōei finds Hidemori and accuses him of the murder but is overpowered and tied up with Kano. One of Hidemori's men shoots Chōei's .44 Magnum at Kano but the recoil causes the bullet to hit the steam pipe from which they are hanging. Kano and Chōei fight their way free but Chōei is injured by a masked man while escaping. Hidemori and his bonded brother Jono show Mr. Fujikawa a video of Jono whipping his lover Kenji Mizuki.

Kano is arrested for killing Hidemori's men but escapes from police custody when Chōei tells him that he has seen the real killer's face. Kano rushes to Chōei's apartment but finds him murdered and sees the killer escaping. Kano catches the killer, a fellow police officer trying to eliminate individuals whom he considers to be scum, and kills him.

At the taping of A Star Is Born, Miki is too nervous to perform and Hidemori gives her an injection of drugs to help. Kano determines that Miki killed Mayumi with her own belt, which was too small for Mayumi, and had had a locked engraved with the name "YUNA" to plant on the body before it was burnt. He tells this information to Hidemori, who reveals that he paid a yakuza to act as the crazed admirer who was holding Miki hostage in order to gain cheap publicity. Jono and Hidemori's other men enter but Kano kills them all. He uses a lucky bullet given to him by Chōei that is supposed to protect his life as his final bullet to kill Hidemori by shooting him through a door. He asks Miki to return to Ishigaki but she insists on finishing the show. She wins the competition and sings an encore of her song "My Memory" for the audience. Kano performs a traditional ritual of throwing shells and determines that the person known as "Yuna" is ultimately dead. He and his pet pig set off to return to the island.

== Cast ==
- Sonny Chiba as Joji Kano (加納 錠治, Kanō Jōji)
- Janet Hatta as Miki Haruno
- Eiko Matsuda as Kosode Murasaki
- Takuzō Kawatani as Hideyoshi Kinoshita
- Hideo Murota as Jirō Takamatsu (officer of Shinjuku)
- Koichi Iwaki as Chōei Mikawa
- Jūkei Fujioka as Takeo Sano
- Nenji Kobayashi as Katsuo Kōyama (Mikawa's friend)
- Seizō Fukumoto as one of Hidemori's followers
- Tatsuo Endō as Fujikawa
- Hiroki Matsukata as Kaiji Hidemori (a yakuza and Miki's manager)

== Release ==
Doberman Cop was released on July 2, 1977.
