= Takuma Tsurugi =

Fictional character

- First appearance: The Street Fighter
- Last appearance: The Street Fighter's Last Revenge
- Portrayed by: Sonny Chiba

In-universe information
- Nicknames: "The Street Fighter" (US), "Killer Fist" (JP), "The Dragon" (UK)
- Gender: Male
- Occupation: Mercenary, assassin, bodyguard, Chinese boxer, karateka
- Family: Raizon Tsurugi (father, deceased), Unnamed mother (deceased)
- Nationality: Chinese-Japanese

Takuma Tsurugi also referred to as Terry Sugury in English-dubbed versions, is a fictional character portrayed by Sonny Chiba in The Street Fighter film trilogy.

Tsuguri is a martial arts expert and a professional mercenary for hire. As opposed to the many heroic protagonists portrayed in the chopsocky boom of the 1970s, Tsurugi is an amoral antihero who kills for the highest price and is hardly concerned with what is in the right.

== Fictional biography ==
Takuma Tsurugi was born to a Japanese father and a Chinese mother in 1939. In 1944 during the Second Sino-Japanese War, a five-year-old Tsurugi received martial arts training from his father, who had perfected his own unique hybrid-martial art known as Satsujin-ken (殺人拳, lit. "killer fist") which is Japanese Karate fused with Chinese Boxing. Tsurigi's father was tried and convicted of treason by the Japanese government due to his marriage to a Chinese woman, a charge based solely on racial prejudice. Despite his oaths of loyalty to the Japanese Empire, Tsurugi's father was executed by firing squad, an event that Tsurugi witnessed. The traumatic event proved to be the formative moment of Tsurugi's young life, causing him to grow up as a distrustful, amoral mercenary living only to prove his own fighting abilities which is from there on thirty years later in his life in 1974. Tsurugi has little in the way of a moral code, and will resort to any means necessary to collect on debts owed to him, including selling his debtors' family into sexual slavery.

== Skills and abilities ==
Like his father, Takuma is a black-belt of the traditional arts of Karate and Kung-Fu. As a skilled assassin, he possesses intense fighting abilities who ferociously dispense brutal and deadly bodily harm towards his enemies. However, he has no qualms about fighting dirty either, hence his given title The Street Fighter. He has poked peoples eyes, cracked their necks by stomping on them with side of his shoe, and even castrating an assailant predator by grasping and tearing off his genitals single-handedly in under one second. On multiple occasions, he has fractured skulls from a single punch to the victim's head and has injured a man by ripping out his throat. He holds an incredible resilience to inflicted injuries, capable of withstanding from a bullet shot to his back and a stab wound in the abdomen all together.

While he tends to engage in hand-to-hand combat with his enemies, he is also proficient in many Japanese weaponry arts including the sai and throwing knives. On the field, he distinctly dons a black karategi; a bronze leather belt wrapped around the jacket of his gi, rather than a traditional obi (belt); completed with a pair of white socks inside of black jump boots; his regular weapon of choice is his pair of brown han kote (samurai gauntlets) with steel armor to ward off blade-wielding foes, deliver fatal forearm blows, and to conceal several kunais. He may also use disguises to infiltrate and reach his target undetected. He is usually wearing a black M-1965 field jacket.
