= Kōji Wada (actor) =

Japanese actor

- Born: 28 January 1944; Mito, Ibaraki, Japan
- Died: 6 July 1986 (aged 42); Tokyo, Japan
- Occupation: Actor
- Years active: 1959–1986
- Spouse: Michiyo Azusa (m. 1971; div. 1972)

Kōji Wada (和田 浩治, Wada Kōji; 28 January 1944 – 6 July 1986) was a Japanese actor.

== Career ==
In 1959, Wada was scouted and joined Nikkatsu Company at the age of 15. Wada's film debut was the 1959 film Mugon no Rantō directed by Katsumi Nishikawa. In 1971, he left Nikkatsu and became a freelance actor. As a freelance actor he appeared in supporting roles in such films as The Street Fighter's Last Revenge, New Battles Without Honor and Humanity: Last Days of the Boss.

== Death ==
In December 1984, he complained of his first discomfort, saying that his stomach hurt, but he disguised it with medication. On June 1, 1985, he finally couldn't stand it anymore and went to the hospital, where he was admitted to the hospital urgently. At the end of the year, he miraculously recovered and was temporarily discharged from the hospital and resumed his activities. After a short hiatus, he returned to Ooka Echizen and recorded his last recording, Nagusame, but in 1986, his health deteriorated again. He was hospitalized for 10 days from February 14, and after that, the situation continued to fluctuate. On May 15, he appeared on "Hiroshi Sakai's Rumor Studio" (NTV system), and was readmitted to the hospital on May 17, two days after performing "Nagusame". He died of stomach cancer on July 6, 1986, at the age of 42, under the care of his wife.

== Selected filmography ==
=== Film ===
- Mugon no Rantō (1959) : Masao Kinoshita
- The Poem of the Blue Star (1960) : Toru Fujimoto
- Go to Hell, Hoodlums! (1960) : Sadao Matsudaira
- Tokyo Knights (1961) : Koji Matsubara
- Sunset Hill (1964) : Shinji
- Gate of Flesh (1964) : Abe
- Carmen from Kawachi (1966) : Akira Sakata
- Three Stray Dogs'7 : Eiji Minagawa
- The Black Sheep (1967) : Jun Yamazaki
- Gappa: The Triphibian Monster (1967) : Machida
- To Kill a Kille (1967) : Hanji
- Alleycat Rock: Female Boss (1970) : Michio Yagami
- The Street Fighter's Last Revenge (1974) : Kunigami
- Barefoot in Blue Jeans (1975) : Keiichi Kazama
- New Battles Without Honor and Humanity: Last Days of the Boss (1976) : Tsutomu Nakamichi
- Eden no Umi (1976)
- A Tale of Sorrow and Sadness (1977) : Yoshizawa
- Proof of the Man (1977) : Kawanishi
- Mito Kōmon (1978) : Genpachiro Tsurugi

=== Television ===
- Ryōma ga Yuku (1968) : Takasugi Sinsaku
- Edo o Kiru III (1977) : Sakichi
- Ōoka Echizen (1978–86) : Kazama Shunsuke
