= Andre Morgan =

American film producer

- Born: 1952 (age 73–74); Rabat, Morocco
- Education: University of Kansas
- Occupations: Film producer, financial consultant
- Years active: 1972–present
- Organization(s): Windsong Pictures, Siren Films Ltd., Morgan & Chan, Ruddy Morgan Organization, Golden Harvest Organization
- Spouse: Miss Maria Wee

Andre Morgan is an American film producer and financial consultant.

In 1981, with colleagues Bobby Meyers, Robbie Little, Mark Damon, Andy Vajna and Mario Kassar, Morgan co-founded the American Film Market (AFM), an annual event in Santa Monica, California where film and television professionals meet to buy films.

== Ruddy Morgan Organization ==
Morgan Co. founded the Ruddy Morgan Organization with Albert S. Ruddy. Ruddy Morgan Organization produced over 40 films and 400 hours of television, including the film The Cannonball Run, as well as the television series Martial Law and Walker: Texas Ranger.

== China film and television ==
After selling his interest in Golden Harvest in 1984, Morgan returned to China in 2000. He was the driving force in the creation of "Hweilai Studios" in Shanghai – the first private sector studio in China, which opened in 2001. Hweilai produced not only Chinese content, but also English-language movies and television.

Since launching RMO in China in 2000, Morgan has produced Chinese-language films. In 2002, he also executive produced Flatland, the first Sino-American television series. In 2005, he was the Executive Producer of the first Sino-American film co-production – Merchant Ivory’s The White Countess, starring Ralph Fiennes and Vanessa Redgrave. His production of Peter Chan’s Perhaps Love, the first Chinese musical in 25 years, was chosen as Hong Kong’s 2006 Academy Awards entry, winning 22 international awards, including 6 Hong Kong Film Awards. In 2007, the epic The Warlords, starring Jet Li, Andy Lau and Takeshi Kaneshiro, garnered 17 awards and 19 nominations, including Best Picture at the Hong Kong Film Awards. He also produced multiple television series in China.

== Acting roles ==
Morgan's acting roles include the 1973 martial arts film, When Taekwondo Strikes. He played the part of Father Louis. Morgan produced the 1975 film The Man from Hong Kong which starred Jimmy Wang Yu and George Lazenby. Morgan played a small role in the film as a gunman.

== Filmography ==
Morgan was a producer in all films unless otherwise noted.

=== Film ===
Year	Film	Credit	Notes
1973	Enter the Dragon	Associate producer	Uncredited
1973	When Taekwondo Strikes		
1974	The Shrine of Ultimate Bliss		Uncredited
1974	Himalayans		
1975	The Man from Hong Kong	Executive producer	
1977	The Amsterdam Kill		
1978	The Boys in Company C		
1978	Game of Death	Associate producer	
1980	Night Games		
1980	The Big Brawl	Executive producer in charge of production	
1981	Game of Death II		
1981	Death Hunt	Executive producer	Uncredited
1981	The Cannonball Run	Executive producer	Uncredited
1982	Megaforce		Uncredited
1982	Deadly Eyes	Executive producer	
1983	High Road to China		
1983	Better Late Than Never	Executive producer	Uncredited
1984	Lassiter	Executive producer	
1984	Cannonball Run II	Executive producer	
1988	Paramedics	Executive producer	
1989	Farewell to the King		
1989	Speed Zone	Executive producer	
1990	Impulse		
1992	Ladybugs		
1994	Bad Girls		
1994	The Scout		
1996	Heaven's Prisoners		
1997	Mr. Magoo	Executive producer	
2000	China Strike Force		
2005	Perhaps Love		
2005	The White Countess	Executive producer	
2006	Cloud 9		Direct-to-video
2006	McDull, the Alumni	Executive producer	
2007	The Warlords	Executive producer	
2011	My Kingdom		
2012	The Locked Door	Executive producer	
2016	The Faith of Anna Waters	Executive producer	
2018	Reborn		

As an actor

Year	Film	Role	Notes
1972	The Way of the Dragon	Restaurant Patron	Uncredited
1973	When Taekwondo Strikes	Father Lewis	
1974	The Shrine of Ultimate Bliss	None	
1975	The Man from Hong Kong	Thug	
1978	Game of Death	None	Uncredited

Miscellaneous crew

Year	Film	Role
1973	Enter the Dragon	Assistant to producer: Hong Kong
2007	Protégé	Presenter
2008	Camille	Representative: Ruddy Morgan Organization

As writer

Year	Film
1973	S.T.A.B.
1982	Megaforce

Production manager

Year	Film	Role
1981	Death Hunt	Production supervisor
1981	The Cannonball Run	Production supervisor

Thanks

Year	Film	Role
2003	Shattered Glass	Acknowledged assistance
2019	Above Suspicion	Special thanks

=== Television ===
Year	Title	Credit	Notes
1991	Miracle in the Wilderness	Executive producer	Television film
1998−2000	Martial Law	Executive producer	
1993−2001	Walker, Texas Ranger	Executive producer	
2002	Flatland	Executive producer	
2005	Walker, Texas Ranger: Trial by Fire	Executive producer	Television film
