= Return of the Street Fighter =

- Theatrical poster
- Directed by: Shigehiro Ozawa
- Written by: Hajime Koiwa
- Starring: Sonny Chiba; Yōko Ichiji; Masashi Ishibashi
- Cinematography: Sadaji Yoshida
- Music by: Toshiaki Tsushima
- Distributed by: Toei Company
- Release date: April 27, 1974
- Running time: 85 minutes
- Country: Japan
- Language: Japanese
- Box office: $1,507,000

Return of the Street Fighter originally titled in Japan as Satsujin-ken 2 also released in the United Kingdom as Blood of the Dragon is a 1974 martial arts film which stars Sonny Chiba, Yōko Ichiji and Masashi Ishibashi. It is the sequel of The Street Fighter and was initially released on Home video by MGM/CBS Home Video and New Line Home Video. It was followed by The Street Fighter's Last Revenge.

Shout! Factory acquired the license of all three films in the series for a Blu-ray release on February 19, 2019 via Shout! Selects Line.

== Premise ==
Takuma "Terry" Tsurugi returns to take on a yakuza family as they are embezzling money from charities to finance their syndicate operations.

== Cast ==
- Shinichi Chiba as Takuma "Terry" Tsurugi
- Yōko Ichiji as Pin Boke/Kitty
- Masafumi Suzuki as Kendō Masaoka
- Kaoru Nakajima as Kazuko Masaoka
- Naoki Shima (Zulu Yachi) as Shichirō Yamagami
- Masashi Ishibashi as Tateki "Junjo" Shikenbaru
- Hiroshi Tanaka as Isamu Ōtaguro
- Katsuya Yamashita as Imura
- Masagorō Koizumi as Fujimura
- Masataka Iwao as Masuda
- Lín Xùn-Měi as Tateishi
- Kazuyuki Saitō as Kuroda
- Kuniaki Nukui as Katō
- Keisuke Handa as Takutoshi
- Claude Gagnon as Don Costello
- Yoshiki Yamada as Inspector Fujisaki
- Shunji Sasaki as a police clerk
- Michimaro Otabe as Shinsei, Rising Sun Construction manager
- Shingo Yamashiro as a man in Sauna

== Release ==
The film was released on 27 April 1974.
