= Shogun's Shadow =

- Film poster
- Directed by: Yasuo Furuhata
- Screenplay by: Sadao Nakajima; Hiro Matsuda
- Produced by: Tatsuo Honda; Shigeru Okada
- Starring: Ken Ogata; Sonny Chiba; Hiroyuki Nagato; Hiroki Matsukata; Tetsuro Tamba
- Cinematography: Kiyoshi Kitasaka
- Edited by: Eifu Tamaki
- Music by: Masaru Sato
- Production company: Toei Company
- Distributed by: Toei Company
- Release date: January 14, 1989 (Japan)
- Running time: 111 minutes
- Country: Japan
- Language: Japanese

Shogun's Shadow (Japanese: 将軍家光の乱心 激突, Hepburn: Shōgun Iemitsu no ranshin: Gekitotsu) is a 1989 Japanese chanbara film directed by Yasuo Furuhata. The film was written by Hiro Matsuda and Sadao Nakajima, and follows a group of swordsmen hired to protect a five year old who is next in line to become shogun of Japan. It stars Ken Ogata, Sonny Chiba, Hiroyuki Nagato, Hiroki Matsukata and Tetsuro Tamba. Toei Company released the film on January 14, 1989, in Japan. The film's score was composed by Masaru Sato, while its theme song, "Faith of Love", was performed by the Japanese rock band The Alfee.

== Plot ==
Takechiyo, the eldest son of shogun Tokugawa Iemitsu, is threatened by attacks from assassins. The attempts on his life are the result of a conflict for the succession for the shogunate. Under the law, Takechiyo is the rightful heir, but he is hated by Iemitsu, who is dying of a disease and has gone insane. Abe Shigetsugu, Iemitsu's prime minister, is responsible for sending the assassins in his lord's name to have Takechiyo replaced in favor of his younger brother Tokugawa Tokumatsu. Seven rōnin are hired by the Sakura clan lord, Hotta Masamori, to protect young Takechiyo. Their leader is Igō Gyōbu, who was married to Abe's sister Oman until Iemitsu developed a crush on her. To further his ambitions, Abe forced her to become Iemitsu's concubine, compelling Igō to leave in protest.

Soon after the first attempt against Takechiyo, Abe and his guard chief Iba Shōzaemon visit Hotta's estate to inform him that Takechiyo is expected at Edo Castle within the next five days, or else the Sakura clan will face punishment. On the road, Hotta's retinue is attacked and massacred by Iba and his men, but Igō's team, accompanied by Lord Hotta's son Masatoshi and lady-in.waiting Yajima, has departed with Takechiyo much earlier. This leads to a relentless chase through Japan's wilderness, during which Takechiyo and Igō gradually form a bond. As their pursuers ambush them, one by one the rōnin heroically lay down their lives to ensure Takechiyo's safe delivery to Edo; Igō, the last one standing, dies after killing Iba in the final confrontation.

Once Takechiyo has arrived at Edo, Iemitsu gives Oman the order to poison the boy, but then Oman recognizes a dagger Igō gave to Lady Yajima to protect Takechiyo and desists. Takechiyo is called before his father and openly renounces him. When Iemitsu tries to kill him in his rage, Yajima takes the fatal blow for the boy and kills Iemitsu with Igō's dagger. After publicly announcing that Iemitsu has succumbed to his illness, Abe, who has grown disillusioned with his master's viciousness towards his own son, commits seppuku. At Iemitsu's funeral, Takechiyo contemptuously casts a handful of ash against his father's name tablet, and instead sadly reminisces about Igō, who has been more like a father to him.

== Cast ==
- Ken Ogata as Igō Gyōbu
- Sonny Chiba as Iba Shōzaemon
- Kano Miyuki as Yajima no Tsubone (Lady Yajima Tsubone)
- Sayoko Ninomiya as Oman no Kata
- Takeshi Maya as Hotta Masatoshi
- Toshihiro Asari as Sobue Iori
- Masaki Kyomoto as Tokugawa Iemitsu
- Yūji Oda as Tobe Sahieji
- Seizo Fukumoto
- Masataka Naruse as Domon Genzaburō
- Hiroyuki Nagato as Tagaya Rokubei
- Hu Jianqiang as Shishi Jingoemon
- Hiroki Matsukata as Abe Shigetsugu
- Tetsuro Tamba as Hotta Masamori
- Ippei Shigeyama as Takechiyo
- Norihito Arai as Koori Deneemon
