= When Taekwondo Strikes =

1973 film by Huang Feng

- US DVD cover with the alternative title Sting of the Dragon Masters

Chinese name
- Traditional Chinese: 跆拳震九州
- Simplified Chinese: 跆拳震九州
- Literal meaning: Taekwondo Shakes Kyushu
Transcriptions
Standard Mandarin
- Hanyu Pinyin: Táiquán Zhèn Jiǔzhōu
- Directed by: Huang Feng
- Written by: Huang Feng
- Produced by: Raymond Chow; Andre Morgan
- Starring: Angela Mao; Jhoon Rhee; Anne Winton; Hwang In-Shik; Kenji Kazama; Carter Wong; Sammo Hung
- Cinematography: Danny Li Yu-tang
- Edited by: Peter Cheung
- Music by: Lai Tsao-hua
- Production company: Golden Harvest
- Distributed by: Golden Harvest
- Release date: 1973
- Running time: 95 minutes (original); 91 minutes (South Korea)
- Country: Hong Kong
- Language: Cantonese
- Box office: HK$1.1 million

When Taekwondo Strikes (Chinese: 跆拳震九州; lit. 'Taekwondo Shakes Kyushu', also released as Sting of the Dragon Masters and Taekwondo Heroes) is a 1973 Hong Kong martial arts film written and directed by Huang Feng and produced by Golden Harvest Studios. It stars Angela Mao and taekwondo grandmaster Jhoon Rhee, his only starring role in a film. It also features Anne Winton, Carter Wong, Ken Kazama, Hwang In-shik, Sammo Hung, and Andre Morgan.

== Plot ==
In Japanese-occupied Korea, freedom fighter Kim Chen-cheuh gets into a fight with a group of Japanese thugs, and is chased into a church. The priest, Father Louis, is captured and tortured after trying to protect him. Trying to secure his release, the leader of the resistance and taekwondo master Lee Chung-dong is himself captured and tortured by the Japanese. Kim and his compatriots, including the Chinese martial artist Huang Lee-chen and Father Louis' niece Marie, have to now try and rescue him.

== Cast ==
- Angela Mao as Huang Lee-chen
- Jhoon Rhee as Lee Chung-dong
- Carter Wong as Kim Chen-cheuh
- Ken Kazama as Yokohama
- Anne Winton as Marie
- Hwang In-shik as Tanaka
- Andre Morgan as Father Louis
- Sammo Hung as Saito
- Huang Feng as Lieutenant Makibayashi
- Chin Shan as Ji-hun
- Hong Wei as Huang's mother
- Chin Chun as Cho
- Alan Chui Chung-San, Yuen Biao, Lam Ching-Ying and Chan Wui-ngai as Japanese thugs

== Development ==
Rhee landed the role in the film with help from his friend Bruce Lee whom he met in 1964 while both were performing demonstrations at an international karate event held in Long Beach, California. In 1972, Lee went to Golden Harvest Films boss Raymond Chow with the idea of making a movie about Taekwondo with Rhee in lead role. Rhee who never thought of himself as an actor didn't think it would come to fruition but a year later in the summer of 1973, Rhee was flying to Hong Kong to star in the film which was set in Korea, playing the part of Master Lee, a leader of a group of underground patriots. The plot for the film was based on a synopsis written by Rhee. It didn't take long to produce the film and by 19 July Rhee was back in the United States. This was when Bruce Lee called him to let him know that the film's editing had been done and it was ready for release. Rhee was looking at the possibility of more film work but with Lee's death which was around the film's release and the possibility of being away from his family didn't appeal to him. So this became his first and last film.

This was the first film for Rhee. It was also the first film for Anne Winton, a 23‐year‐old student from Washington. An article in the Lowell Sun suggested that Winton's role, with her as a blonde American girl in the film along with some other new approaches may have also been for international appeal and profit. Winton who had studied ballet at the University of Michigan came to Washington in the early 1970s. Later she attained a black belt in Taekwondo. Playing the part of Mary, the niece of the Catholic priest Father Louis, she, according to reviewer World Film Geek held her own quite well in the role. Far East Films in its review said she was surprisingly both powerful in fighting ability and acting.

== Production ==
Filming took place mostly in Hong Kong, with some location shooting in South Korea. In an interview, Angela Mao stated that Golden Harvest liked shooting in Korea because the style of architecture resembled that of mainland China.

Some sources, like the Hong Kong Movie Database, credit Shin Sang-ok as a production manager for the South Korean scenes, though he is not credited on the film itself.

Sammo Hung was the film's action director, in addition to playing one of the villainous henchmen.

== Reception ==
The movie has a mixed reception from critics.
