= Drifting Detective: Black Wind in the Harbor =

- Directed by: Kinji Fukasaku
- Written by: Yoshinari Matsubara; Fumio Konami
- Produced by: Masamichi Sato
- Starring: Sonny Chiba
- Cinematography: Masahiko Iimura
- Edited by: Hiroshi Suzuki
- Music by: Masayoshi Ikeda
- Distributed by: Toei (Daini Toei Co.)
- Release date: June 23, 1961
- Running time: 60 minutes
- Country: Japan
- Language: Japanese

Drifting Detective: Black Wind in the Harbor (風来坊探偵 岬を渡る黒い風, Fūraibō tantei: Misaki o wataru kuroi kaze) is a 1961 Japanese film directed by Kinji Fukasaku and starring Sonny Chiba. It is a sequel to Drifting Detective: Tragedy in the Red Valley. Shinichi Chiba plays the role of Goro Saionji, who appeared in the first film, but Shigemi Kitahara, who played Misako Kayama in the first film, plays the role of Makiko Eto in the sequel.

== Plot ==
Drifting detective Goro Saionji is asked to investigate the sinking of a fishing boat in a port town on the Bōsō Peninsula and runs up against the smuggling gang behind the case.

== Cast ==
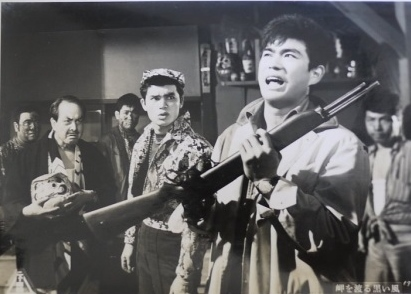
Sonny Chiba holding a Winchester rifle

- Sonny Chiba as Goro Saionji
- Shigemi Kitahara as Makiko Eto
- Harumi Sone as Tetsu the Joker
- Junya Usami as Shotaro Nanjo
- Takashi Kanda as Daizo Tatara
- Yayoi Furusato as Shizuko Hatori
- Yuko Kobayashi as Chiyoko Nakano
- Yasushi Nagata as Gonosuke Horikoshi
- Ryo Ono as Kenji Gomi
- Koji Sekiyama as Roku Gachame
- Seiya Satô as Tatsu Bakkuri
- Ichirô Kojima as Junpei Kakurai
- Kappei Matsumoto as Jukichi Eto
- Akira Kuji, Gôzô Sôma, Minoru Sawada, and Satoshi Tamai as Horikoshi's henchmen

== Production ==
The movie was filmed in black and white with mono audio.
