= Tatsuo Endō (actor) =

Japanese actor (1928–2012)

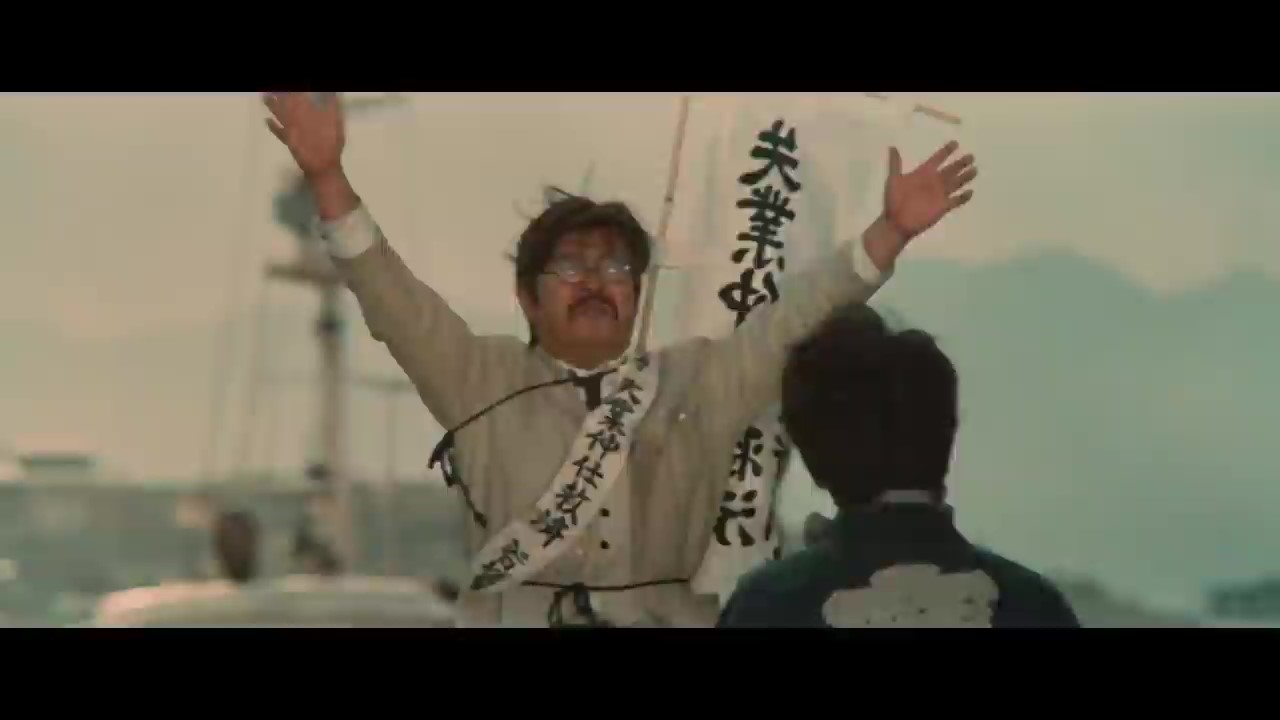
- Born: 30 January 1928; Kyoto, Japan
- Died: 7 July 2012 (aged 84); Kyoto, Japan
- Occupation: Actor
- Years active: 1957–2012

Tatsuo Endō (遠藤太津朗, Endō Tatsuo; 30 January 1928 – 7 July 2012) was a Japanese actor. He is famous for playing the role of Manhichioyabun on the television jidaigeki series Zenigata Heiji.

== Selected filmography ==
=== Film ===
- Soren dasshutsu: Onna gun'i to nise kyôjin (1958) - Sugiyama
- Raiden (1959)
- The End of Summer (1961) - Hayashi Seizo
- Ôsaka yaro (1961)
- Love Under the Crucifix (1962)
- A Wanderer's Notebook (1962)
- New Tale of Zatoichi (1963) - Inn keeper
- Dokonjo ichidai (1963)
- Chi to daiyamondo (1964)
- Zatoichi's Flashing Sword (1964) - Boss Yasugoro of Takeya
- Kenka inu (1964)
- Kaoyaku (1965) - Kôda
- Nezumi kozo Jirokichi (1965)
- Matatabi san ning yakuza (1965)
- Muhômatsu no isshô (1965) - Kumakichi
- Bôryoku no minato: Tora to ôkami (1965)
- Hondara kenpô (1965)
- Zatôichi jigoku tabi (1965) - Yakuza boss of Ejimaya
- Meiji kyokyakuden - sandaime shumei (1965)
- Barâ kêtsu shobû (1965)
- Yojōhan monogatari: Shōfu shino (1966) - Segawa Kikuzo
- Nyohan hakai (1966) - Tôzô
- Izuko e (1966)
- Daimajin (1966) - Inugami Gunjuro
- Waka oyabun norikomu (1966)
- Yakuza gurentai (1966)
- Tairiku nagaremono (1966)
- Bakuto Shichi-nin (1966)
- Nemuri Kyôshirô: Buraiken (1966) - Genshin Kusakabe
- Kiba Ôkaminosuke (1968) - Nizaemon
- Bôken daikatsugeki: Ôgon no touzoku (1966)
- Yoidore hatoba (1966) - Tetsugogô
- Zoku kyôdai jingi (1966)
- Shin heitai yakuza (1966)
- Santo hei oyabun shutsu jin (1966)
- Santo hei oyabun (1966)
- Ôtazune mono shichinin (1966)
- Noren ichidai: jôkyô (1966)
- Zatôichi tekka tabi (1967) - Iwagoro
- Otoko no shôbu: Niô no irezumi (1967) - Matazô Kuramoto
- Bakuchi-uchi: Ippiki ryû (1967)
- Nemuri Kyôshirô burai-hikae: Mashô no hada (1967)
- Zatôichi rôyaburi (1967) - Boss Tomizo
- Shusse komori-uta (1967)
- Kawachi yûkyôden (1967)
- Zoku Toseinin (1967) - Masugorô Iwabuchi
- Umî no G-Men: taiheiyô no yojinbô (1967)
- Otoko namida non hâmonjô (1967)
- Kyokotsu ichidai (1967)
- Kyokakû no okitê (1967)
- Hana fudâ tôsei (1967)
- Ah kaiten tokubetsu kogetikai (1968)
- Shinobi no manji (1968)
- Bakuchi-uchi: Nagurikomi (1968) - Ishida
- Hitori okami (1968)
- Zenka mono (1968)
- Bazoku yakuza (1968)
- Kaettekita gokudô (1968)
- Ikasama bakuchi (1968)
- Hibotan bakuto: Isshuku ippan (1968) - Gisuke Kuramochi
- Tomuraishi tachi (1968) - Yonekura
- Otoko no shobu: byakko no tetsu (1968)
- Gokuchu no kaoyaku (1968)
- Gokuaku bôzu (1968)
- Bakuto Ichidai Chimatsuri Fudo (1969) - Gozo
- Hibotan bakuto: Nidaime shûmei (1969)
- Hissatsu bakuchi-uchi (1969)
- Yoru no kayô series: Onna (1969)
- Tosei-nin Retsuden (1969)
- Nihon jokyo-den: kyokaku geisha (1969)
- Gorotsuki butai (1969)
- Gokuaku bôzu: nenbutsu hitokiri tabi (1969)
- Chôeki san kyôdai (1969)
- Bakuto ikka (1970)
- Gokuaku bozu nenbutsu sandangiri (1970)
- Onna toseinin (1971)
- Kantô Tekiya ikka: Goromen himatsuri (1971)
- Bakuchi-uchi: Inochi-huda (1971)
- Suibare ikka: otoko ni naritai (1971)
- Poruno no teiô (1971)
- Gendai poruno-den: Sentensei inpu (1971) - Ken'ichirô Matsumura
- Onna toseinin: ota no mushimasu (1971)
- Nihon jokyo-den: ketto midare-bana (1971)
- Nihon aku nin den (1971)
- Kizu darake no jinsei (1971)
- Akû oyabûn tai daigashî (1971)
- Junko intai kinen eiga: Kantô hizakura ikka (1972)
- Kînagashî hyâkunîn (1972)
- Shôkin kubi: Isshun hachi-nin giri (1972)
- Lone Wolf and Cub: Baby Cart in Peril (1972) - Yagyū Retsudo
- Zorome no san kyôdai (1972)
- Showa onna bakuto (1972)
- Otoko no daimon (1972)
- Sukeban (1972)
- Battles Without Honor and Humanity (1973)
- Sex & Fury (1973) - Inamura
- Mamushi no kyôdai: Musho gurashi yonen-han (1973)
- Shin Zatôichi monogatari: Kasama no chimatsuri (1973) - Boss Iwagoro
- Battles Without Honor and Humanity: Deadly Fight in Hiroshima (1973) - Tokimori Kanichi
- Yasagure anego den: Sôkatsu rinchi (1973) - Gôda
- Kyofu joshikôkô: Furyo monzetsu guruupu (1973) - Hiroshi Nikaidô
- Battles Without Honor and Humanity: Proxy War (1973) - Aihara Shigeo
- Yamaguchi-gumi San-daime (1973)
- Sân ike kangôku: kyo akû han (1973)
- Bohachi Bushido: Code of the Forgotten Eight (1973) - Shirobei Daimon
- Battles Without Honor and Humanity: Police Tactics (1974) - Aihara Shigeo
- The Street Fighter (1974) - Bayan
- The Street Fighter's Last Revenge (1974) - Watanabe Rikizo
- Datsugoku Hiroshima satsujinshû (1974)
- Â kessen kôkûtai (1974)
- Cops vs. Thugs (1975) - Ohara Takeo
- Nihon bôryôku rettô: Keihanshin koroshi no gundan (1975)
- Bakamasa horamasa toppamasa (1976)
- Yamaguchi-gumi gaiden: Kyushu shinko-sakusen (1977)
- Hokuriku dairi sensô (1977)
- Doberman cop (1977) - Fujikawa
- Rashamen (1977) - Denbei Tanimura
- Nihon no Don: Kanketsuhen (1978) - Ryukichi Yoshino
- The Fall of Ako Castle (1978) - Yoshida Chuzaemon
- Hono-o no gotoku (1981)
- Roaring Fire (1982) - Yo Gentoku
- Yaju-deka (1982) - Kido
- Legend of the Eight Samurai (1983) - Mayuroku
- Hissatsu! III Ura ka Omote ka (1986) - Rusui
- Yogisha (1987) - Yunosuke
- Gokudo no onna-tachi 2 (1987) - Hayanose
- Kunoichi ninpô-chô III: Higi densetsu no kai (1993)
- Kunoichi ninpô-chô IV: Chûshingura hishô (1994)
- Shuranosuke Zanma-Ken: Yôma Densetsu (1996) - Taizen Imura
- Karaoke (1999)
- Audition (1999) - Doctor

=== Television ===
- Zenigata Heiji (1966-1984) - Miwa no Manhichioyabun
- Kyoto Satsujinannai (1980-2010) - Chief Akiyama
- Mito Kōmon (season 35) (2005) - Yamino Hotei
