= Yakuza Deka =

- Directed by: Yukio Noda
- Written by: Fumio Konami
- Produced by: Kazunori Ota
- Starring: Sonny Chiba
- Cinematography: Yoshio Nakajima
- Edited by: Osamu Tanaka
- Music by: Masao Yagi
- Distributed by: Toei Company
- Release date: May 23, 1970
- Running time: 89 minutes
- Country: Japan
- Language: Japanese

Yakuza Deka (やくざ刑事; also known as Yakuza Cop, The International Secret Police, and Gangster Cop) is a Japanese film released in 1970. It features Sonny Chiba. It is first film in the Yakuza Deka series.

== Cast ==
- Sonny Chiba as Shiro Hayata (隼田 志郎, Hayata Shirō)
- Nenji Kobayashi as Sasaki
- Rinichi Yamamoto as Okura
- Akira Kume as Kito
- Ryoji Hayama as Goro Miura
- Asao Uchida as Yashiro
- Jūkei Fujioka as Chief Detective
- Ryōhei Uchida as Tetsuji Asai
