= Shigehiro Ozawa =

- Born: 29 August 1922; Nagano, Nagano, Japan
- Died: 12 October 2004 (aged 82); Kyoto, Japan
- Occupation: Director/screenwriter
- Years active: 1956–1976

Shigehiro Ozawa (小沢 茂弘, Ozawa Shigehiro; 29 August 1922 – 12 October 2004) was a Japanese film director and screenwriter. He is best known for his film The Street Fighter. He directed over 110 films between 1954 and 1976.

== Selected filmography ==
- Kunisada Chūji (1958)
- The Valiant Red Peony Pt.4 (1969)
- Kizudarakeno Jinsei (1971)
- The Street Fighter (1974)
- Return of the Street Fighter (1974)
- The Street Fighter's Last Revenge (1974)
- Sister Street Fighter – Fifth Level Fist (1976)
