= Drifting Detective: Tragedy in the Red Valley =

1961 Japanese crime film

- Directed by: Kinji Fukasaku
- Starring: Sonny Chiba
- Cinematography: Masahiko Iimura
- Music by: Masayoshi Ikeda
- Release date: June 9, 1961
- Running time: 62 minutes
- Country: Japan
- Language: Japanese

Drifting Detective: Tragedy in the Red Valley (Japanese: 風来坊探偵 赤い谷の惨劇, Hepburn: Fūraibō Tantei: Akai Tani no Sangeki) (also known as Duel in the Valley) is a 1961 Japanese action film, directed by Kinji Fukasaku and starring Sonny Chiba. It was filmed in black and white with mono audio. It was Fukasaku's directorial debut, and Chiba's first starring role in a film. The film was followed by the sequel Drifting Detective: Black Wind in the Harbor, also released in 1961.

The films starts with the reported death of a wealthy landowner in an aviation accident. A land developer uses forged documents to take over a valley owned by the landowner. A private detective is hired to investigate the suspicious circumstances of the accident. The detective voluntarily becomes the protector of a farming family threatened by the developer's plans.

== Plot ==
Mr. Nagumo, a wealthy landowner, reportedly died in a plane crash in Aikadawa Valley, but his sister Misako Kayama knows that he was a good pilot and suspects that there was foul play. The unscrupulous land developer Kido attempts to use documents bearing Mr. Nagumo's signature to take over the land he owned in the valley and create golf courses there. When the farmer living there, Mr. Ueda, refuses to agree to the takeover, Kido sets an exorbitant monthly rent of 600,000 yen to squeeze him out. Under the guise of running a tourism company, Kido uses his enforcers, including Southpaw Gen and Tetsu the Spade, to take out anyone in his way. A young drifter named Goro Saionji, a private detective hired by Shinnippon Kaihatsu to investigate Mr. Nagumo's death, stumbles upon the conflict when he sees Mr. Ueda's daughter Chikako being attacked and saves her. He chooses to help the farmer's family and solve the mystery of Mr. Nagumo's death.

Kido's men poison the farm's water supply, killing their cows. Mr. Ueda confronts them but is beaten and told to leave the farm. Goro sneaks into Kido's place and confronts his girlfriend with a bottle of her German nail polish that he found at Mr. Nagumo's crash site. At the crash site he shows her the parachute that he found one kilometer away and surmises that she used her experience as a former flight attendant to disable the plane and parachute out of it before the crash. She agrees to confess but is shot dead by Kido's men. Kido's men then set fire to the stables on Mr. Ueda's farm and kidnap Misako, taking her to Kido's place. Kido attempts to rape her but is stopped by Goro. Goro shows Kido a newspaper article about a missing hiker and surmises that Mr. Naguto was still alive after the crash and was forced to sign the papers before Kido's men murdered him and placed the missing hiker's disfigured and unidentifiable body in the plane. Kido insists that Goro has no evidence, but Goro produces Mr. Naguto's body, which he found after an avalanche, and says that the bullet used to kill Naguto matches the one used to kill Kido's girlfriend, both of which came from Kido's gun. Kido's men attack Goro, leading to a gunfight. Tetsu the Spade switches sides and helps Goro fight off Kido's men. Kido begins throwing lit sticks of dynamite but when he is shot he drops one back into the box, causing a massive explosion and killing his men. Goro rescues Misako from the collapsed building where they had been hiding but when he returns to look for Tetsu he can only find his gun. After saying farewell and riding away from the farm, Goro encounters a wounded Tetsu, who reminds him that they will still have a one-on-one duel someday.

== Cast ==
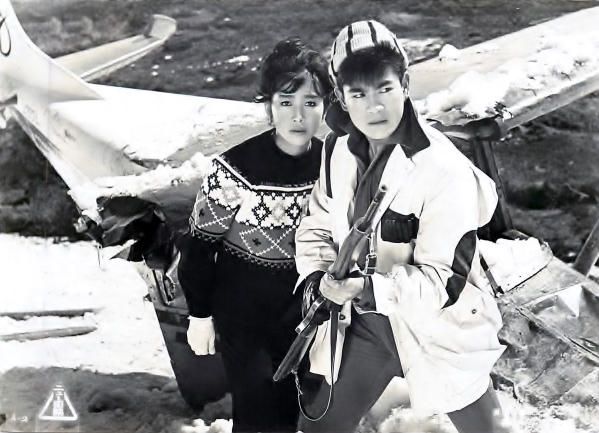
Shigemi Kitahara (left) and Sonny Chiba (right) in a promotional photograph for the film

- Sonny Chiba as Goro Saionji
- Shigemi Kitahara as Misako Kayama
- Harumi Sone as Tetsu the Spade
- Junya Usami as Seitarō Ueda
- Ken Sudo as Daisaku Kitō (Northeast Tourism Boss)
- Yūko Kobayashi as Chikako Ueda
- Yayoi Furusato as Fumie
- Mitsuo Andô as South Paw Minamoto
- Koji Sekiyama as Sei Yodare
- Akira Kuji as Ken Gamechi
- Gozo Soma, Satoshi Tamai, Minoru Sawada, Hiroshi Date, and Tetsu Hoshi as Hunters (Kitō's Subordinates)
- Kazuo Nakanishi, Naoyuki Umezawa, Mitsuru Takeuchi, Ego Kozono, and Yukiko Okada as Children in Ueda Ranch
