= That Man Bolt =

1973 film by David Lowell Rich, Henry Levin

- Original film poster
- Directed by: David Lowell Rich; Henry Levin
- Screenplay by: Ranald MacDougall; Charles Eric Johnson
- Story by: Charles Eric Johnson
- Produced by: Bernard Schwartz
- Starring: Fred Williamson; Mike Stone; Ken Kazama; Emil Farkas; David Stone
- Cinematography: Gerald Perry Finnerman
- Edited by: Carl Pingitore; Robert F. Shugrue
- Music by: Charles Bernstein
- Production company: Universal Pictures
- Distributed by: Universal Pictures
- Release date: December 1973
- Running time: 103 minutes
- Country: United States
- Language: English

That Man Bolt is a 1973 American action film directed by David Lowell Rich and Henry Levin. It stars Fred Williamson in the title role of courier Jefferson Bolt and Byron Webster. The film combined several genres: blaxploitation, the martial arts film, and James Bond superspy films (with some posters featuring the tagline "He's Bonded"). It was filmed in Hong Kong, Macau and the United States and featured several martial arts experts in action: Mike Stone, World Professional Light Heavyweight Karate Champion, Kenji Kazama Japan Kickboxing Champion, Emil Farkas, European Black Belt Karate Champion, and David Chow, Former California State Judo Champion. It was titled Operation Hong Kong outside the United States. Peter Crowcroft wrote the novelization of the screenplay.

== Plot ==
Courier Jefferson Bolt is asked to take a briefcase from Hong Kong to Mexico City, but he is not told what is in it or the identity of the man who asks him, a man named Griffiths. Convinced he will get good pay and see a few good places, Bolt takes on the job, while looking out for anything suspicious. Soon he does find exotic places, beautiful women, and ruthless gunmen interested in the briefcase.

== Cast ==
- Fred Williamson as Jefferson Bolt
- Byron Webster as Griffiths
- Miko Mayama as Dominique Kuan
- Teresa Graves as Samantha Nightingale
- Masatoshi Nakamura as Kumada
- John Orchard as Carter
- Jack Ging as Connie Mellis
- Ken Kazama as Spider
- Vassili Lambrinos as Raoul De Vargas
- David Chow as Chinese Thug
- Paul Mantee as Mickey
- Emil Farkas as Karate Fighter
- Mike Stone as Karate Fighter

== Production ==
Fred Williamson had recently starred in Hammer (1972), produced by Bernard Schwartz, which had been a big success. This led to Universal Pictures signing him for three films featuring the Bolt character as a black James Bond, but avoiding the urban locations of blaxploitation films. The first film was also produced by Schwartz and was known during shooting as Thunderbolt.

Filming look place on location in Hong Kong, Kowloon, Los Angeles, and Las Vegas. The picture began shooting under director Henry Levin. In April 1973, Levin fell ill and was replaced by David Lowell Rich. Reportedly Levin shot for 28 days, including the Hong Kong sequences, while Rich shot for ten days, and supervised the editing. On his days off during filming, Williamson shot scenes for Hell Up in Harlem.

== Reception ==
Variety called it a "travesty".

No more Bolt films were made, though Williamson was paid for two films. He later recalled:

They weren’t ready for a black James Bond... It was a great film! Universal made it and then got scared... They said, “Fred, we don’t know what to do with you. We think we’ll just pay you off, because we don’t really know what to follow up with." So they copped out, out of fear, they copped out. And the big black film movement hadn't really started yet.

== See also ==
- List of American films of 1973
