= The Street Fighter =

1974 Japanese martial arts film

- Japanese theatrical poster

Japanese name
- Kanji: 激突! 殺人拳
Transcriptions
- Revised Hepburn: Gekitotsu! Satsujin-ken
- Directed by: Shigehiro Ozawa
- Written by: Kōji Takada; Motohiro Torii
- Starring: Sonny Chiba; Yutaka Nakajima
- Cinematography: Ken Tsukakoshi
- Edited by: Kozo Horiike
- Music by: Toshiaki Tsushima
- Distributed by: Toei Company
- Release date: February 2, 1974
- Running time: 91 minutes
- Country: Japan
- Language: Japanese
- Box office: $1.5 million

The Street Fighter (Japanese: 激突! 殺人拳, Hepburn: Gekitotsu! Satsujin-ken; lit. Clash! Killer Fist) is a 1974 Japanese martial arts film produced by Toei Company, directed by Shigehiro Ozawa, and starring Sonny Chiba. It was released in the United States by New Line Cinema and became one of the first films to be a commercial success for the distributor. It is notable as the first film to receive an X-rating in the US solely for violence.

A commercial success, The Street Fighter spawned two direct sequels, Return of the Street Fighter and The Street Fighter's Last Revenge, and the Sister Street Fighter spinoff series. There was another spin-off entitled Kozure Satsujin Ken, which was brought to the US by a different company under the title Karate Warriors.

In the United Kingdom, the film was originally released as Kung-Fu Street Fighter presumably to avoid confusion with the Charles Bronson movie Hard Times which was initially released as The Streetfighter in the UK.

== Plot ==
Martial artist Takuma Tsurugi meets the condemned murderer Tateki Shikenbaru while disguised as a Buddhist monk. Tsurugi applies his "oxygen coma punch" to Shikenbaru, causing him to collapse just before he can be executed. As Shikenbaru is rushed to a hospital, Tsurugi and his sidekick Rakuda ambush the ambulance and free him. The duo, who were hired to free Shikenbaru, later watch TV coverage of the incident when their employers, Shikenbaru's brother Gijun and sister Nachi, arrive. Gijun says he cannot pay the rest of the sum he owes and pleads for more time. Outraged at the broken promise, Tsurugi attacks the siblings. In the ensuing struggle, Gijun attempts a flying kick, and when Tsurugi dodges, Gijun falls out the window to his death. Tsurugi then sells Nachi into sexual slavery through crime boss Renzo Mutaguchi.

Mutaguchi and his associates attempt to hire Tsurugi to kidnap an oil heiress, Sarai. Tsurugi refuses once he realizes the gangsters are members of the yakuza and Hong Kong mafia. He escapes, but the yakuza gangsters resolve to kill Tsurugi as well as kidnap Sarai. Tsurugi immediately seeks out Sarai, who is being protected at a Seibukan dojo by her uncle, Kendō Masaoka, a Karate master. Tsurugi challenges the entire dojo to a fight. He brutalizes the rank-and-file students before Masaoka fights him to a standstill. Masaoka recognizes him as the half-Chinese son of a karate master he knew long ago who was executed. Ultimately, Tsurugi offers to protect Sarai, and Masaoka agrees, despite Sarai's protests.

The yakuza leaders, after failing in several attempts to kill Tsurugi, travel to Hong Kong to seek the help of Kowloon Triad boss Dinsau. Dinsau agrees, bringing several fighters and recruiting Shikenbaru to avenge his siblings by killing Tsurugi. Dinsau's fighters successfully kidnap Sarai. Tsurugi and Rakuda rescue her, but Tsurugi stays behind to fend off pursuers and is himself captured. The gangsters torture Tsurugi, who refuses to reveal Sarai's location. Rakuda, concerned for his partner but disobeying Tsurugi's orders, arrives before the gangsters can kill Tsurugi. To save Tsurugi, tells the gangsters where Sarai is. Outraged, Tsurugi forsakes Rakuda.

Tsurugi pursues the kidnappers to a shipyard. There, he fights a blind samurai employed by Dinsau; Rakuda arrives to help but dies by the samurai's sword in a reckless attempt at redemption. Tsurugi avenges and then forgives his fallen friend. Meanwhile, the gangsters plan to force Shirai to sign over her ownership of the oil company to one of their members, but she refuses. Tsurugi boards the oil tanker where Shirai is being held and fights his way through the numerous guards and several yakuza leaders. Dinsau, who has come to respect Tsurugi, permits him to duel Shikenbaru, promising to surrender Sarai if Tsurugi wins. During the duel, the final yakuza leader shoots at Tsurugi, and an outraged Dinsau kills him. Nachi sacrifices herself to give her brother Shikenbaru a free shot with a sai, but Tsurugi survives and rips out Shikenbaru's vocal cords. Critically wounded, Tsurugi is helped to his feet by Sarai and Dinsau in the final shot of the film.

== Cast ==
- Sonny Chiba as Takuma Tsurugi ("Terry Sugury" in the English dub)
- Yutaka Nakajima as Sarai Chuayut-Hammett
- Goichi Yamada as Rakuda Zhang ("Ratnose" in the English dub)
- Masashi Ishibashi as Tateki Shikenbaru ("Junjo Shikenbaru" in the English dub)
- Etsuko Shihomi as Nachi Shikenbaru
- Masafumi Suzuki as Kendō Masaoka
- Chiyoko Kazama as Yang Gei-chuan
- Nobuo Kawai as Tetsunosuke Tsuchida
- Akira Shioji as Liang Dung-yat
- Chico Lourant as Bondo
- Tony Cetera as Abdul Jadot
- Osman Yusuf as Kingstone
- Jirō Yabuki as Gijun Shikenbaru
- Minken Karasawa as Prison Warden Yamazaki
- Takuzō Kawatani as Ôshima
- Kojiro Shirakawa as Royal Hong Kong Police Inspector Chan
- Hisao Mizoguchi as Endoshi ("Yuan" in the English dub)
- Takashi Noguchi as Yokoyama
- Jun'ichi Haruta as Kwok Gwai-lung
- Seizō Fukumoto as Woo Sin-gung
- Ken Kazama as Senkaku Kan
- Rinichi Yamamoto as Kowloon Dingsau
- Fumio Watanabe as Renzō Mutaguchi
- Tatsuo Endō as Bayan
- Satoshi Amatsu as Mōrōkō ("Ming" in the English dub)

== Production ==
During the final year of production of Sonny Chiba's show Key Hunter, Chiba met with Bruce Lee through mutual friends and began discussing working on a film project together as Key Hunter was quite popular in Hong Kong. Due to Chiba's schedule discussion of the film had to be put off and it was only upon Chiba's return to Hong Kong where he'd learned of Lee's death. Inspired by the financial success Toho-Towa had from their release of Enter the Dragon, Toei Company opted to create their own Martial arts film with Chiba as the headliner.

Filming took place on-location in Tokyo, and Toei Studios in Kyoto. The production also shot exterior location footage in Hong Kong.

The martial arts director for the film was Shōrin-ryū Seibukan master Masafumi Suzuki, who also acts in the film as Sensei Kendō Masaoka. Gōgen Yamaguchi was also a technical consultant for the film. Unusually, the film credits separate fight direction for the different martial arts styles displayed, with separate credits for wrestling (Tsutomu Harada, Reggy Jones) and kickboxing (Ken Kazama) direction. Masashi Ishibashi, who plays the villain Tateki Shikenbaru, was Chiba's real-life teacher in Kyokushin Karate.

== US releases ==
The Street Fighter was the first film to receive an X rating solely for intense violence and gore. The film was especially controversial because of a scene in which Tsurugi castrates the rapist Bondo with his bare hands; it is this scene (among others) that reputedly gained the film its 'X' rating. A similarly violent scene involves Tsurugi delivering a powerful punch to an henchman's head, followed by a one-second cut to an x-ray shot of the skull being completely shattered and blood gushing from the man's entire face. 16 minutes were later edited from the film in order to get an R-rating. This was the version initially released on home video by MGM/CBS Home Video in 1980. Since then, the film was re-released in its entirety. Consequently, the English dub of the uncut version suffers from inconsistencies to the soundtrack quality, as the restored footage was dubbed by a different studio using different voice actors.

In the English dubbed versions of The Street Fighter and Return of The Street Fighter, Chiba's character is identified as "Terry Sugury" in the credits but dubbed by the voice actors as "Terry Tsurugi". In The Street Fighter's Last Revenge, however, the voice actors call him "Terry Sugury." Rakuda is named "Ratnose"; The villain Tateki's name is also mistranslated as Junjō.

On November 7, 2018, it was announced that Shout! Factory has acquired the license of all three films in the series for a Blu-ray release on February 19, 2019 via their Shout! Selects line. It contains the dub, and original Japanese audio. For the first time, the uncut original English version was made available, but without the newer audio recordings.

== Legacy and influence ==
The title of fighting game series Street Fighter, starting with the arcade game Street Fighter (1987), was inspired by The Street Fighter.

The Street Fighter introduced x-ray vision fatality finishing moves. It was initially seen as a gimmick to distinguish it from other martial arts films, before it went on to influence later works, including the Mortal Kombat series of fighting games.

The 1991 Hong Kong film Riki-Oh: The Story of Ricky includes a scene where protagonist Ricky Ho Lik-wong delivers an X-ray punch to an attacker.

In 1993, the film (and its sequels) received mainstream exposure in North America when they were featured in Tony Scott's True Romance (written by Quentin Tarantino), which had the two lead characters spending time at a Sonny Chiba Street Fighter marathon.

Quentin Tarantino listed The Street Fighter as number 13 on his top 20 grindhouse films list.

The 2007 video game The Darkness has the entire film available to watch on any of the in-game TVs.
