= Sonny Chiba =

Japanese actor and martial artist (1939–2021)

- 千葉 真一
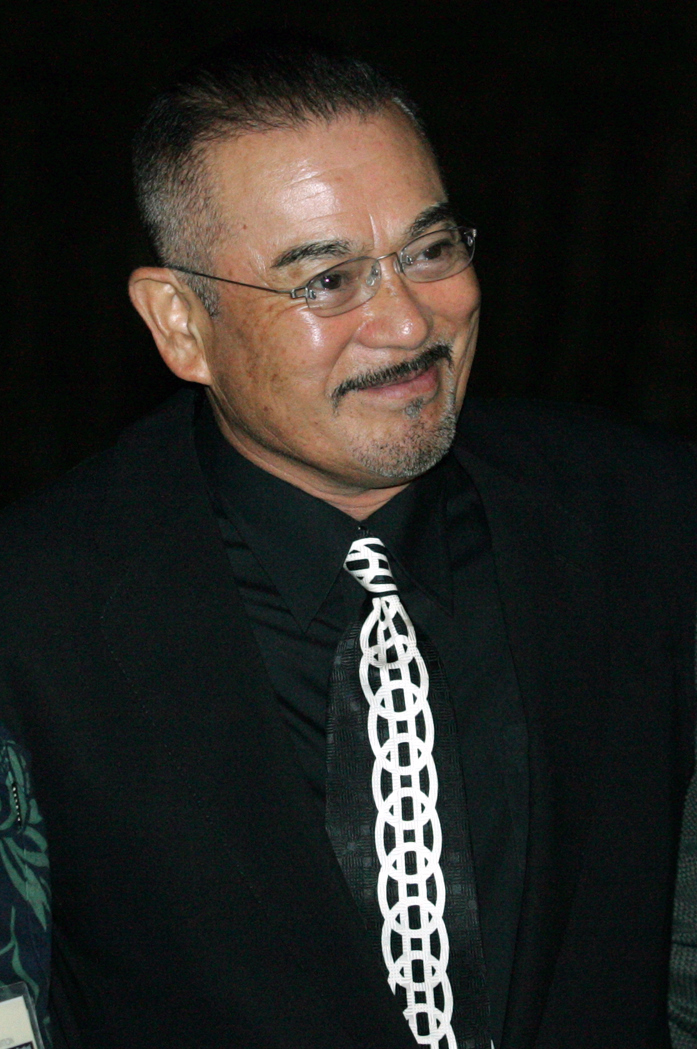
- Chiba in 2007
- Born: Sadaho Maeda; 22 January 1939; Fukuoka, Japan
- Died: 19 August 2021 (aged 82); Kisarazu, Chiba, Japan
- Other names: Shinichi Chiba; JJ Sonny Chiba; Rindō Wachinaga
- Education: Nippon Sport Science University
- Occupations: Actor, martial artist
- Years active: 1960–2021
- Height: 176 cm (5 ft 9 in)
- Spouses: Yōko Nogiwa (m. 1973; div. 1994); Tamami Chiba (m. 1996; div. 2015)
- Children: Juri Manase; Mackenyu; Gordon Maeda
- Relatives: Jirō Yabuki (brother)
- Martial arts career
- Style: Kyokushin karate; Togakure-ryū ninpō taijutsu; Gōjū-ryū karate; Shorinji Kempo; Judo; Kendo
- Teachers: Mas Oyama; Masashi Ishibashi
- Rank: See below

Japanese name
- Kanji: 千葉 真一
- Hiragana: ちば しんいち
- Katakana: チバ シン イチ
Transcriptions
- Romanization: Chiba Shin'ichi

Alternative Japanese name
- Kanji: 前田 禎穂
- Hiragana: まえだ さだほ
- Katakana: マエダ サダホ
Transcriptions
- Romanization: Maeda Sadaho

Alternative Japanese name
- Kanji: 和千永 倫道
- Hiragana: わちなが りんどう
- Katakana: ワチナガ リンドウ
Transcriptions
- Romanization: Wachinaga Rindō
- Website: chibashinichi.com

Shinichi Chiba (Japanese: 千葉 真一, Hepburn: Chiba Shin'ichi; born Sadaho Maeda; 22 January 1939 – 19 August 2021) IPA: [tɕiꜜba ɕiɰ̃itɕi], known internationally as Sonny Chiba, was a Japanese actor and martial artist. Chiba was one of the first actors to achieve stardom through his skills in martial arts, initially in Japan and later to an international audience.

Born in Fukuoka, Chiba played a variety of sports in high school, including baseball and volleyball. He also practiced gymnastics and participated at the National Sports Festival of Japan in his third year. When he was a university student, he learned martial arts, earning a black belt in Kyokushin Karate in 1965 and later receiving a fourth degree in 1984.

Chiba's career began in the 1960s, when he starred in two tokusatsu superhero shows. In his first role, he replaced Susumu Wajima as the main character Kōtarō Ran/Seven Color Mask in Seven Color Mask (Nana-iro Kamen) in the second half of the series. However, his breakthrough role was in the 1974 film The Street Fighter. Before retiring, Chiba had also appeared in a number of English language American films, including Kill Bill: Volume 1 (2003) and The Fast and the Furious: Tokyo Drift (2006).

Chiba died of COVID-19 complications at the hospital in Tokyo on 19 August 2021, at the age of 82.

== Names ==
Born Sadaho Maeda (前田 禎穂, Maeda Sadaho), he used the stage name "Chiba Shinichi" throughout his professional career. When New Line Cinema released the film Gekitotsu! Satsujin ken (激突! 殺人拳) in the United States in 1974, they retitled it The Street Fighter and billed its star as Sonny Chiba. Later, Chiba modified the name to "JJ Sonny Chiba", wherein the initials stood for "Justice Japan". After appearing in the taiga drama Fūrin Kazan in November 2007, he announced the retirement of the stage name "Shinichi Chiba"; henceforth he was billed "JJ Sonny Chiba" as an actor and Rindō Wachinaga (和千永 倫道, Wachinaga Rindō) as a film director.

== Early life ==
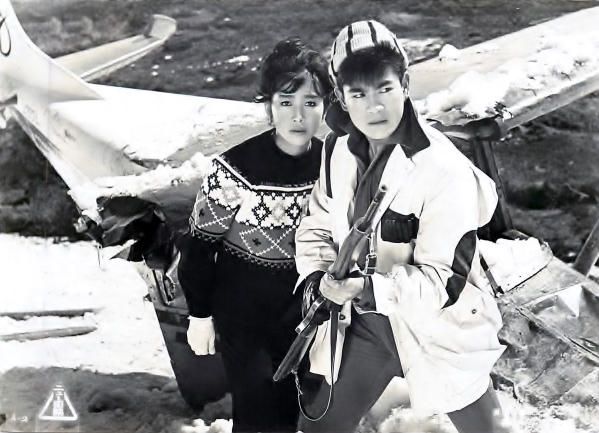
Chiba in Drifting Detective: Tragedy in the Red Valley, 1961

Chiba was born in Fukuoka, the third of five children. His father was a pilot for the Imperial Japanese Army Air Service; his mother, originally from Kumamoto Prefecture, had competed in track and field in her youth. When he was four years old, his father was transferred to Kisarazu, Chiba, and the family moved to Kimitsu, Chiba Prefecture.

After Chiba went to junior high school in Kimitsu, the physical education teacher advised him to do artistic gymnastics. He also was passionate about track and field sports, baseball, and volleyball. He participated in those four sports championships of Chiba Prefecture. In high school, Chiba dedicated himself to artistic gymnastics and won the National Sports Festival of Japan while in his third year. He enjoyed watching movies, including Western movies such as Shane and High Noon.

Chiba went to the Nippon Sport Science University in 1957. He was a serious candidate for a place in the Japanese Olympic team in his late teens until he was sidelined by a back injury. While he was a university student, he began studying martial arts with the renowned Kyokushin Karate master Masutatsu "Mas" Oyama (whom he later portrayed in a trilogy of films), which led to a first-degree black belt on 15 October 1965, later receiving a fourth-degree on 20 January 1984.

== Career ==
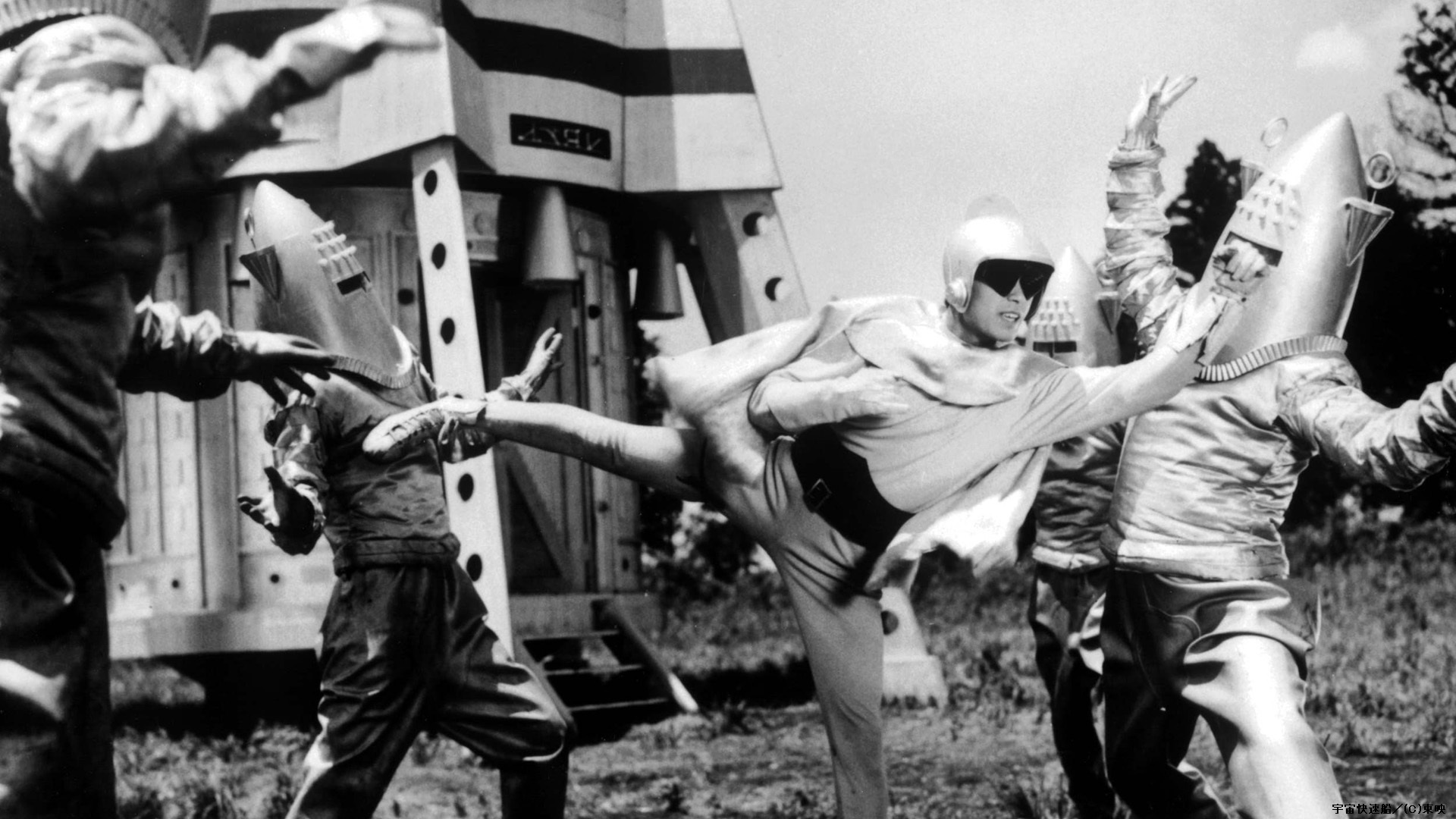
Chiba in Invasion of the Neptune Men, 1961

Sometime around 1960, he was discovered in a talent search (called "New Face") by the Toei film studio, and he began his screen career soon after. The CEO of Toei at the time gave him the stage name "Shinichi Chiba".

His acting career began on television, starring in two tokusatsu superhero shows, first replacing Susumu Wajima as the main character Kōtarō Ran/ Seven Color Mask in Seven Color Mask (Nana-iro kamen) in the second half of the series and then starring as Gorō Narumi/Messenger of Allah in Messenger of Allah (Allah no Shisha). He starred in the 1961 science fiction movie Invasion of the Neptune Men and the first Kinji Fukasaku film, Drifting Detective: Tragedy in the Red Valley, which marked the beginning of a long series of collaborations for the two. Over the next decade, he was cast primarily in crime thrillers. By 1970, Chiba had started his own training school for aspiring martial arts film actors and stunt performers known as JAC (Japan Action Club), in order to develop the level of martial arts techniques and sequences used in Japanese film and television. Today the organization is known as Japan Action Enterprise (JAE). He starred in Karate Kiba (Bodyguard Kiba) in 1973, which was his first martial arts movie. Chiba's breakthrough international hit was The Street Fighter (1974) which was brought to Western audiences (dubbed in English) by New Line Cinema. The film and its sequels established him as the reigning Japanese martial arts actor in international cinema for the next two decades. It was New Line Cinema founder Robert Shaye who gave Chiba the English name "Sonny", which Chiba would adopt as his own (mostly for non-Japanese projects) from that point on.

Chiba's subsequent projects included such pictures as The Bullet Train (1975), Karate Warriors (1976), Doberman Cop (1977), Golgo 13: Assignment Kowloon (1977), and The Assassin (1977). He also occasionally returned to the science fiction genre, in movies such as Message from Space (1978). He also began to star on some jidaigeki such as Shogun's Samurai (1978), The Fall of Ako Castle (1978), G.I. Samurai (1979), Shadow Warriors (1980), and Samurai Reincarnation (1981). He was not only actor in but also stunt coordinator for G.I. Samurai, Burning Brave (1981), and Shogun's Shadow (1989). He was executive producer and director for Yellow Fangs (1990) and also directed and starred in Oyaji (2007).

Chiba portrayed Yagyū Jūbei Mitsuyoshi multiple times, first in the 1978 film Shogun's Samurai and in its TV series remake The Yagyu Conspiracy, which aired from 1978 to 1979. He then appeared as Jūbei in the TV series Yagyū Abaretabi, which aired from 1980 to 1981 and in the 1981 film Samurai Reincarnation (Makai Tensho) and its theatrical musical version Yagyu Jubei Makai Tensho. He then reprised his role as Jūbei in the second season of Yagyū Abaretabi, this time entitled Yagyū Jūbei Abaretabi, which aired from 1982 to 1983. A few years later he returned to play Jūbei in Iemitsu, Hikoza, and Isshin Tasuke: A National Crisis, a TV movie that aired in 1989. His final appearance as Jūbei was in 2 direct-to-DVD films entitled Sarutobi Sasuke and the Army of Darkness 3: Wind Chapter and Sarutobi Sasuke and the Army of Darkness 4: Fire Chapter in 2005. Other notable Japanese television roles for Chiba were the ninja leaders Hattori Hanzō III, Tsuge Shinpachi, Tarao Hanzō, and Hattori Hanzō XV across multiple seasons of the Shadow Warriors TV series and Hattori Hanzō I in the 2003 direct-to-DVD series follow-up Shin Kage no Gundan (New Shadow Warriors).

Chiba was even busier in the 1980s, doing dozens of movies as well as making forays into television, and with roles in such high-profile adventures as the popular Hong Kong comic-based movie The Storm Riders (1998), starring alongside Ekin Cheng and Aaron Kwok. His fame in Japan remained unabated into the 1990s.

In his fifties, the actor resumed working as a choreographer of martial arts sequences. At the dawn of the 21st century, Chiba was as busy as ever in feature films and also starring in his own series in Japan. Roles in Takashi Miike's Deadly Outlaw: Rekka and his work with directors Kenta and Kinji Fukasaku in Battle Royale II effectively bridged the gap between modern day and yesteryear cinematic cult legends. Chiba's enduring onscreen career received a tribute when he appeared in a key role as Hattori Hanzo, the owner of a sushi restaurant and retired samurai sword craftsman, in director Quentin Tarantino's bloody revenge epic Kill Bill: Volume I in 2003.

Chiba starred in more than 125 films for Toei Studios and has won numerous awards in Japan for his acting.

== Personal life ==
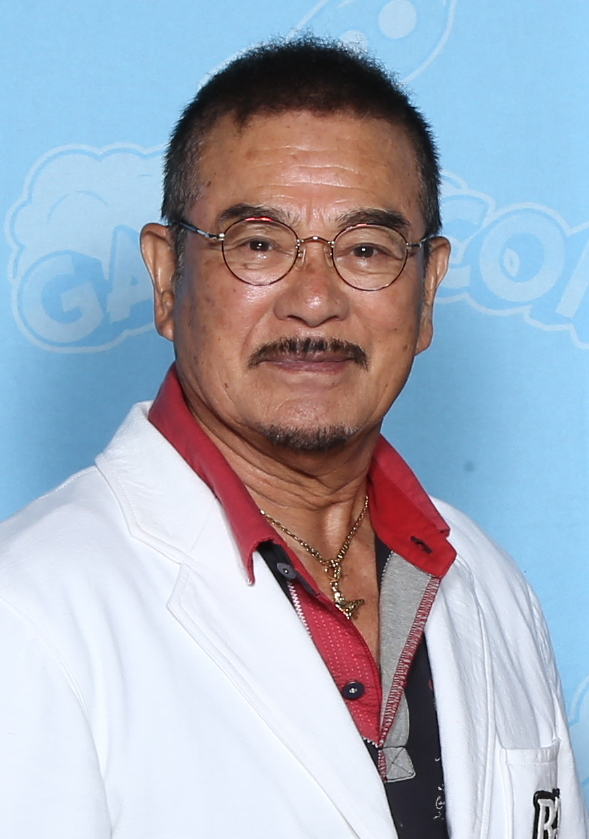
Chiba at the GalaxyCon Raleigh in 2019

In 1994 Chiba divorced his first wife, actress Yōko Nogiwa. Their daughter Juri Manase is also an actress.

He married Tamami Chiba in 1996, with whom he had a 28-year age difference. They had two sons, Mackenyu and Gordon Maeda, who are both actors. Chiba and Tamami Chiba divorced in 2015.

Also in 2015, Weekly Shincho reported that Chiba was romantically involved with a 22-year old female university student. At the time, his divorce with Tamami Chiba was in the process of being finalized.

His younger brother, Jirō Yabuki (also known as Jiro Chiba), was also an actor.

== Death ==
In early August 2021, Chiba contracted COVID-19 (due to the highly contagious Delta variant). Initially, he was treated at home, but was hospitalized a few days later on 8 August when he developed pneumonia. He died at the hospital in Kisarazu, Chiba, on 19 August 2021, at the age of 82. He had not received double or triple vaccination, according to his agency. His body was cremated on 20 August after a private funeral.

== In Western popular culture ==
The protagonist, Clarence Worley (Christian Slater), in the Quentin Tarantino-written True Romance (1993) is a fan of Chiba. In a pivotal early scene, he watches a Chiba triple feature. A modified version of the opening scroll to the English dub of Karate Kiba (1973, English:: The Bodyguard) was used in the script of Tarantino's 1994 film Pulp Fiction. Tarantino's script changed the Ezekiel 25:17 speech, swapping out "I am Chiba the Bodyguard" for "my name is the Lord".

Tarantino worked with Chiba in 2003 with Kill Bill: Volume I, in which Chiba portrays Katana master maker Hattori Hanzō in a vignette that combines comical interaction with his assistant (Kenji Ohba), with sombre references to traditional Japanese sword making.

The character Takayuki Chiba from the shōnen manga series Kengan Ashura is based on Chiba and Hiroyuki Sanada.

== Martial arts ranks ==
Chiba held black belts in the following martial arts:

- Kyokushin Karate: 4th Dan
- Togakure-ryū Ninpō Taijutsu: 4th Dan
- Goju-ryu karate: 2nd Dan
- Shorinji Kempo: 2nd Dan
- Judo: 2nd Dan
- Kendo: 1st Dan

== Filmography ==
=== Film ===
Year	Title	Role	Notes
1961	Police Department Story: Alibi (警視庁物語 不在証明(ありばい))	Detective Nakagawa	
1961	Police Department Story: The 15 Year Old Woman (警視庁物語 十五才の女)	Detective Nakagawa	
1961	Drifting Detective: Tragedy in the Red Valley (風来坊探偵 赤い谷の惨劇)	Gorō Saionji	
1961	Drifting Detective: Black Wind in the Harbor (風来坊探偵 岬を渡る黒い風)	Gorō Saionji	
1961	Invasion of the Neptune Men (宇宙快速船)	Shinichi Tachibana/Iron Sharp	
1961	Hepcat in the Funky Hat (ファンキーハットの快男児)	Ichirō Tenka	
1961	Police Department Story: Twelve Detectives (警視庁物語 十二人の刑事)	Detective Nakagawa	
1961	Hepcat in the Funky Hat: The 20,000,000 Yen Arm (ファンキーハットの快男児 二千万円の腕)	Ichirō Tenka	
1961	Shinto Boss Series: Employee Ishimatsu Is the Man (進藤の社長シリーズ 石松社員は男でござる)	Nagashima	
1962	The Kamikaze (南太平洋波高し)	Yūki	
1962	Love School (恋愛学校 ラブ・スクール)	Shinichi Kogure	
1962	Escape: The 2/26 Incident (二・二六事件 脱出)	Private First Class Shinohara	
1962	For Love, the Sun, and the Gang (恋と太陽とギャング)	Yamauchi	
1962	Higher Than the Stars in the Sky (あの空の果てに星はまたゝく)	Yoshio Horimoto	
1962	Tragedy of Twins (残酷な月)	Masaki	
1962	Four Sisters (山麓)	Shinkichi Hayami	
1962	Mid-August Commotion (八月十五日の動乱)	Dr. Ōmori	
1962	Gang vs. G-Men (ギャング対Gメン)	Osamu Kaji	
1962	The Gambler (王将)	Mōri	
1962	The Terrifying Witch (恐怖の魔女)	Daisuke Shirono	
1963	Twins Searching for Mother (こまどりのりんごっ子姉妹)	Ume-san	
1963	President Jiro and Employee Ishimatsu: Yasugi Bushi Road (次郎長社長と石松社員 安来ぶし道中)	Hiroshi Shiomi	
1963	The Violent Underworld (暴力街)	Kazuo Ichinoki	
1963	Special Tactical Police (特別機動捜査隊)	Detective Naitō	
1963	Twins in the Meadow (こまどり姉妹 未練ごころ)	Kenichi Tomizawa	
1963	Judo for Life (柔道一代)	Shirō Hongō	
1963	Special Tactical Police 2 (特別機動捜査隊 東京駅に張り込め)	Detective Naitō	
1963	Lure of A Killer (殺人鬼の誘惑)	Daisuke Jōno	
1963	Gambler Tales of Hasshu: A Man's Pledge (八州遊侠伝 男の盃)	Satarō	
1963	The Chivalrous of Asakusa (浅草の侠客)	Shinsuke Hayama	
1963	The Navy (海軍)	Takao Mutaguchi	
1963	Song of the Yakuza (やくざの歌)	Shunji Nitta	
1963	Gang Chusingura (ギャング忠臣蔵)	Shichirō Yatō	
1963	White Ball (白い熱球)	Yōta Ogiwara	
1963	Life of Blackmail (わが恐喝の人生)	Gorō Ozawa	
1964	Decree from Hell (地獄命令)	Shinichi Ōmatsu	
1964	Judo for Life: The Devil of Kodokan (柔道一代 講道館の鬼)	Shirō Hongō	
1964	Tokyo Untouchable: Prostitution Underground Organization (東京アンタッチャブル 売春地下組織)	Yoshio Hamada	
1964	Here Because of You (君たちがいて僕がいた)	Makoto Yabuki	
1964	Dragon and Tiger Generation (竜虎一代)	Shinichi Matsuhashi	
1965	Singing to Those Clouds (あの雲に歌おう)	Jun Tonomura	
1965	That Cute Girl (可愛いあの娘)	Morimoto	
1965	Hey, Clouds! (おゝい、雲!)	Saburō Tatsumi	
1965	Tale of Japanese Burglars (にっぽん泥棒物語)	Attorney Ōki	
1965	The Fugitive (逃亡)	Saburō Tateishi	
1965	Yakuza G-Men: Meiji Underworld (やくざGメン 明治暗黒街)	Tōru Shibayama	
1965	A Villain's Code Of Honor (無頼漢仁義)	Sōichi Jinnai	
1965	Abashiri Prison: Hokkai Territory (網走番外地 北海篇)	Hayama	
1966	Bitches of the Night (夜の牝犬)	Tatsuo Ōtsuki	
1966	Kamikaze Man: Duel at Noon (カミカゼ野郎 真昼の決斗)	Ken Mitarai	
1966	Terror Beneath the Sea (海底大戦争)	Ken Abe	
1966	Abashiri Prison: Duel in the South (網走番外地 南国の対決)	Tanimura	
1966	Dash to the Sun (太陽に突っ走れ)	Takashi Shindō	
1966	Game of Chance (浪曲子守唄)	Bungo Endō	
1966	Ōgon Bat (黄金バット)	Dr. Yamatone	
1967	Soshiki Bōryoku (組織暴力)	Shinji Takasugi	
1967	Game of Chance 2 (続 浪曲子守唄)	Bungo Endō	
1967	Diaries of the Kamikaze (あゝ同期の桜)	Second Sub-lieutenant Hanzawa	
1967	The North Sea Chivalry (北海遊侠伝)	Shūichi Aida	
1967	King of Gangsters (ギャングの帝王)	Matsumoto	
1967	Game of Chance 3 (出世子守唄)	Bungo Endō	
1967	Kawachi Chivalry (河内遊侠伝)	Komakichi Sugimoto	
1968	Human Torpedoes: Kaiten Special Attack Force (人間魚雷 あゝ回天特別攻撃隊)	Chief navigator Takiguchi	
1968	Army Intelligence 33 (陸軍諜報33)	Kazuo Yamamoto	
1968	The Young Eagles of the Kamikaze (あゝ予科練)	Second Sub-lieutenant Kodama	
1969	Delinquent Boss: Ocho the She-Wolf (不良番長 猪の鹿お蝶)	Mitsuo Fujiki	
1969	Memoir of Japanese Assassinations (日本暗殺秘録)	Tadashi Onuma	
1970	Yakuza Deka (やくざ刑事)	Shirō Hayata	
1970	Yakuza Cop 2: Marijuana Trafficking Syndicate (やくざ刑事 マリファナ密売組織)	Shirō Hayata	
1970	The Last Suicide Squad (最後の特攻隊)	Captain Mishima	
1971	Yakuza Cop 3: Poison Gas Affair (やくざ刑事 恐怖の毒ガス)	Shirō Hayata	
1971	Yakuza Cop 4: No Epitaphs for Us (やくざ刑事 俺たちに墓はない)	Shirō Hayata	
1972	Yakuza Wolf: I Perform Murder (狼やくざ 殺しは俺がやる)	Gōsuke Himuro	
1972	Vice G-Men (麻薬売春Gメン)	Yasuo Kikuchi	
1972	Wandering Ginza Butterfly 2: She-Cat Gambler (銀蝶流れ者 牝猫博奕)	Ryūji Azuma	
1972	Yakuza Wolf 2: Extend My Condolences (狼やくざ 葬いは俺が出す)	Tōru Ibuki	
1972	Vice G-Men 2: Terrifying Flesh Hell (麻薬売春Gメン 恐怖の肉地獄)	Haruo Kikuchi	
1973	Battles Without Honor and Humanity: Deadly Fight in Hiroshima (仁義なき戦い 広島死闘篇)	Katsutoshi Ōtomo	
1973	Bodyguard Kiba (ボディガード牙)	Naoto Kiba	
1973	Tokyo-Seoul-Bangkok Drug Triangle (東京-ソウル-バンコック 実録麻薬地帯)	Tatsuya Wada	
1973	Bodyguard Kiba 2 (ボディガード牙 必殺三角飛び)	Naoto Kiba	
1974	The Street Fighter (激突! 殺人拳)	Takuma Tsurugi	
1974	Return of the Street Fighter (殺人拳2)	Takuma Tsurugi	
1974	Military Spy School (ルバング島の奇跡 陸軍中野学校)	Ichirō Kikuchi	
1974	The Executioner (直撃! 地獄拳)	Ryūichi	
1974	Sister Street Fighter (女必殺拳)	Seiichi Hibiki	
1974	The Street Fighter's Last Revenge (逆襲! 殺人拳)	Takuma Tsurugi	
1974	The Executioner II: Karate Inferno (直撃地獄拳 大逆転)	Ryūichi	
1975	Killing Machine (少林寺拳法)	Doshin So	
1975	Young Nobility: Maki of the 13 Steps (若い貴族たち 13階段のマキ)	Kenichi Hyūga	
1975	Wolfguy: Enraged Lycanthrope (ウルフガイ 燃えろ狼男)	Akira Inugami	
1975	The Bullet Train (新幹線大爆破)	Aoki	
1975	Champion of Death (けんか空手 極真拳)	Masutatsu Ōyama	
1975	Detonation: Violent Riders (爆発! 暴走族)	Tsugami	
1975	New Battles Without Honor and Humanity: The Boss's Head (新仁義なき戦い 組長の首)	Bartender	Uncredited
1975	The Defensive Power of Aikido (激突! 合気道)	Shinbei Natori	
1975	Karate Bearfighter (けんか空手 極真無頼拳)	Masutatsu Ōyama	
1976	Dragon Princess (必殺女拳士)	Isshin Higaki	
1976	Yokohama Underworld: Machine Gun Dragons (横浜暗黒街 マシンガンの竜)	Keiichi Komatsu	
1976	Karate Warriors (子連れ殺人拳)	Shūhei Sakata	
1976	The Rugby Star (ラグビー野郎)	Rikio Ōtate	
1976	Jail Breakers (脱走遊戯)	Wataru Kangi	
1976	Okinawa Yakuza War (沖縄やくざ戦争)	Seigō Kunigami	
1977	Yakuza War: The Japanese Don (やくざ戦争 日本の首領)	Tsuneyoshi Sakota	
1977	Soul of Chiba (激殺! 邪道拳)	Mu Yun Tek	Planning
1977	Hokuriku Proxy War (北陸代理戦争)	Hachirō Kanai	
1977	Karate for Life (空手バカ一代)	Mas Oyama	
1977	Gambler's Code of Japan (日本の仁義)	Katsuji Kogure	
1977	Doberman Cop (ドーベルマン刑事)	Jōji Kanō	
1977	Torakku Yarō (トラック野郎・度胸一番星)	Jōji Niimura	
1977	Golgo 13: Assignment Kowloon (ゴルゴ13 九竜の首)	Golgo 13/Duke Tōgō	
1977	Black Jack: The Visitor in the Eye (ブラック・ジャック 瞳の中の訪問者)	Drunk	
1978	Shogun's Samurai (柳生一族の陰謀)	Yagyū Jūbei Mitsuyoshi	
1978	Message from Space (宇宙からのメッセージ)	Prince Hans	
1978	Okinawa: The Ten Year War (沖縄10年戦争)	Chōyū Inami	
1978	The Fall of Ako Castle (赤穂城断絶)	Kazuemon Fuwa	
1979	Dead Angle (白昼の死角)	Yōsuke Ōta	
1979	Hunter in the Dark (闇の狩人)	Samon Shimoguni	
1979	The Resurrection of the Golden Wolf (蘇える金狼)	Mitsuhiko Sakurai	
1979	The Bushido Blade	Prince Ido	
1980	Virus (復活の日)	Dr. Yamauchi	
1980	Shogun's Ninja (忍者武芸帖 百地三太夫)	Shōgen Shiranui	Action director
1981	G.I. Samurai (戦国自衛隊)	Lt. Yoshiaki Iba	Action director
1981	Chanbara Graffiti (ちゃんばらグラフィティー 斬る!)		documentary
1981	Samurai Reincarnation (魔界転生)	Yagyū Jūbei Mitsuyoshi	
1981	Roaring Fire (吼えろ鉄拳)	Shunsuke Tachikawa	Action director
1981	The Kamikaze Adventurer (冒険者カミカゼ -ADVENTURER KAMIKAZE-)	Daisuke Kamikaze	
1981	The Blazing Valiant (燃える勇者)		Action Director
1982	Fall Guy (蒲田行進曲)	Himself	
1982	Ninja Wars (伊賀忍法帖)	Yagyū Munetoshi	
1983	Kabamaru the Ninja (伊賀野カバ丸)	Saizō Igano	Planning
1983	Legend of the Eight Samurai (里見八犬伝)	Dōsetsu Inuyama	
1984	Kotaro to the Rescue (コータローまかりとおる!)	Moore County colonel	Planning
1985	The Last True Yakuza (最後の博徒)	Ryōzō Kanō	
1986	Cabaret (キャバレー)		
1987	Sure Death 4: Revenge (必殺4 恨みはらします)	Bunshichi Warabeya	
1989	Tetsuro Tamba's Large Spiritual World (丹波哲郎の大霊界 死んだらどうなる)		
1989	Shogun's Shadow (将軍家光の乱心 激突)	Shōzaemon Iba	Action director
1989	Sensei (せんせい)	Makoto Ushiyama	Producer
1990	Yellow Fangs (リメインズ 美しき勇者たち)		Director; Producer
1991	Gokudo Wars (極道戦争 武闘派)	Takatsugu Kasai	
1992	Fighting Fist (HAKEN 覇拳 ふりむけば修羅)	Superintendent Yamada	Director
1992	Aces: Iron Eagle III	Colonel Sueo Horikoshi	
1992	A Mine Field (地雷原)	Hiromichi Takagi	Original idea
1992	The Triple Cross (いつかギラギラする日)	Shiba	
1994	Immortal Combat	Jiro 'J.J.' Jintani	
1995	Body Count	Makoto	
1998	The Storm Riders (風雲 ストームライダーズ)	Lord Conqueror	
2000	The Legend of the Flying Swordsman (小李飛刀之飛刀外傳)	'Dagger' Yuan-ba Li	
2000	Born to Be King (勝者為王)	Ichio Kusakari	
2000	Chinchiromai (ちんちろまい)	Takeshi Kuroda	
2001	The Melancholy Hitman (悲しきヒットマン 蒼き狼)		Direct-to-video
2001	Akumyoh (悪名)	Tōyōzō Kuroshima	Direct-to-video
2001	Koroshi no Gundan (殺しの軍団)	Miyoshi	Direct-to-video
2001	Koroshi no Gundan 2 (殺しの軍団 関西制圧への道)	Miyoshi	Direct-to-video
2002	Akumyoh 2 (悪名2 〜荒ぶる喧嘩魂〜)	Tōyōzō Kuroshima	Direct-to-video
2002	Deadly Outlaw: Rekka (実録 安藤昇侠道伝 烈火)	Yasunori Hijikata	
2002	Yakuza of Legend: Chapter of Raging Fire (伝説のやくざ ボンノ 烈火の章)		
2002	Don no Michi 6 (首領の道6)	Takagi	Direct-to-video
2003	Don no Michi 7 (首領の道7)	Takagi	Direct-to-video
2003	Don no Michi 8 (首領の道8)	Takagi	Direct-to-video
2003	New Shadow Warriors (新・影の軍団)	Hattori Hanzō I	Planning
2003	Yakuza of Legend: Chapter of the Setting Sun (伝説のやくざ ボンノ 落日の章)		Direct-to-video
2003	New Shadow Warriors II (新・影の軍団II)	Hattori Hanzō I	Planning
2003	Don no Michi 9 (首領の道9)	Takagi	Direct-to-video
2003	Battle Royale II: Requiem (バトル・ロワイアルII 鎮魂歌)	Makio Mimura	
2003	True Kyūshū Yakuza 1 (新実録・九州やくざ烈伝 兇健と呼ばれた男)	Isoji Ōga	Direct-to-video
2003	New Shadow Warriors III (新・影の軍団III 地雷火)	Hattori Hanzō I	Executive producer
2003	Kill Bill: Volume 1	Hattori Hanzō	Kenjutsu Choreographer
2003	Namishō no Yamamoto-ja! Kenka Yakyū-hen (浪商のヤマモトじゃ! 喧嘩野球編)		Direct-to-video
2004	New Shadow Warriors IV (新・影の軍団IV 地雷火)	Hattori Hanzō I	Executive producer
2004	Kill Bill: Volume 2	Hattori Hanzō	
2004	Kill Bill: The Whole Bloody Affair	Hattori Hanzō	
2004	Zenidō (銭道)	Kōjirō Shinkai	
2004	Zenidō 2 (銭道2 借金地獄抜け道指南)	Kōjirō Shinkai	
2004	Zenidō 3 (銭道3 なにわ金融指南)	Kōjirō Shinkai	
2004	New Boss of Japan (新・日本の首領)	Matsuo Takano	Direct-to-video
2004	New Boss of Japan 2 (新・新・日本の首領II 非情篇)	Matsuo Takano	Direct-to-video
2004	New Boss of Japan 3 (新・新・日本の首領III 激闘篇)	Matsuo Takano	Direct-to-video
2004	Survive Style 5+	Kazama	
2004	Zenidō 4 (銭道4 男と女の金融講座)	Kōjirō Shinkai	Direct-to-video
2004	Explosive City (爆裂都市)	Otosan	
2004	Zenidō 5 (銭道5 無限連鎖講)	Kōjirō Shinkai	Direct-to-video
2005	Zenidō 6 (銭道6)	Kōjirō Shinkai	
2005	New Shadow Warriors V (新・影の軍団V 服部半蔵VS陰陽師)	Hattori Hanzō I	
2005	New Shadow Warriors VI (新・影の軍団 最終章)	Hattori Hanzō I	
2005	Sarutobi Sasuke and the Army of Darkness 3: Wind Chapter (猿飛佐助 闇の軍団3 風の巻)	Yagyū Jūbei Mitsuyoshi	
2005	Sarutobi Sasuke and the Army of Darkness 4: Fire Chapter (猿飛佐助 闇の軍団4 火の巻 完結篇)	Yagyū Jūbei Mitsuyoshi	
2006	The Fast and the Furious: Tokyo Drift	Boss Kamata	
2006	Master of Thunder (マスター・オブ・サンダー 決戦!! 封魔龍虎伝)	Genryū	
2006	The Winds of God: Kamikaze	Nobutada Ōta	
2006	True Kyūshū Yakuza 2 (実録九州やくざ抗争 誠への道)	Isoji Ōga	Direct-to-video
2007	True Kyūshū Yakuza 3 (実録九州やくざ抗争 誠への道 完結編)	Isoji Ōga	Direct-to-video
2007	Oyaji (親父)	Ryūmichi Numata	Director
2009	Sennen no Matsu (千年の松)		Direct-to-video
2009	Sennen no Matsu 2 (千年の松 完結篇)		Direct-to-video
2012	Shura no Hanamichi (修羅の花道)	Yoshio Sutama	
2012	Shura no Hanamichi 2 (修羅の花道 2)	Yoshio Sutama	Direct-to-video
2012	Gokudō no Monshō Part 18 (極道の紋章 第十八章)		Direct-to-video
2012	Sushi Girl	Sushi chef	
2013	Nihon Tōitsu (日本統一)	Seizō Gonda	
2013	Nihon Tōitsu 2 (日本統一 2)	Seizō Gonda	Direct-to-video
2014	Shura no Denshō Araburu Kyō Inu (修羅の伝承 荒ぶる凶犬)	Shūhei Akiyama	
2014	Kabukichō High School (歌舞伎町はいすくーる)	Hakkaisan board chairman	
2014	Kanto Gokudo Association Part 1 (関東極道連合会 第一章)		Direct-to-video
2015	Take a Chance	Miyamoto Musashi	
2015	Kanto Gokudo Association Part 2 (関東極道連合会 第二章)		Direct-to-video
2015	April Fools (エイプリルフールズ)	Bōryokudan leader	
2015	So-On: The Five Oyaji (騒音)		
2017	Gokudō Tenka Fubu Part 1 (極道天下布武 第一幕)	Motonari Mōriya	
2017	Teppen (頂点(てっぺん))		Direct-to-video
2017	Gokudō Tenka Fubu Part 2 (極道天下布武 第二幕)	Motonari Mōriya	
2017	Teppen 2 (頂点(てっぺん) 2)		Direct-to-video
2017	Teppen 3 (頂点(てっぺん) 3)		Direct-to-video
2017	Shashin Koshien Summer in 0.5 Seconds (写真甲子園 0.5秒の夏)	Chair workshop craftsman	
2017	Gokudō Tenka Fubu Part 4 (極道天下布武 第四幕)	Motonari Mōriya	
2023	Bond of Justice: Kizuna	Jō	Posthumous release; Final film role

=== Television ===
Year	Title	Role	Notes
1960	Seven Color Mask (新七色仮面)	Seven Color Mask II/Kōtarō Ran	26 episodes
1960	Messenger of Allah (アラーの使者)	Gorō Narumi	26 episodes
1960	Wanted: Demon Fire (指名手配 悪魔の火)		1 episode
1963	The Light of Asakusa (浅草の灯)		TV film
1964	JNR Inspector No. 36 (鉄道公安36号)	Railway Inspector Hayakawa	4 episodes
1965	Flag of Glory (栄光の旗)	Lieutenant Yamanaka	Part 1
1965–1966	Blind Black Belt (くらやみ五段)	Tatsuya Kurami	
1965	Special Tactical Police (特別機動捜査隊)	Detective Komatsu	1 episode
1965–1966	Kiiroi Fūdo (黄色い風土)		
1968–1973	Key Hunter (キイハンター)	Yōsuke Kazama	
1969	Special Investigation Office (特命捜査室)		1 episode
1970	Judo Straight Line (柔道一直線)	Washio	3 episodes
1972–1974	The Young Detective (刑事くん)	Detective Yabuki	3 episodes
1973	Robot Detective (ロボット刑事)	Keitarō Shinjō	2 episodes
1973	Suspense Series: Modern Witch Tale Murderous Love (サスペンスシリーズ 現代鬼婆考 殺愛)	Shige	1 episode
1974	The Bodyguard (ザ・ボディガード)	Shūsuke Washimi	26 episodes
1975	The Gorilla Seven (ザ★ゴリラ7)	Daisuke Kazami	26 episodes
1975–1976	Blazing Dragnet (燃える捜査網)	Shirō Ōgami	14 episodes
1976	Emergency Line (大非常線)	Masahiro Godai	10 episodes
1976	Nanairo Tongarashi (七色とんがらし)	Tetsuo Samejima	
1977	Shingo Tondeke Torimonochō (新伍とんでけ捕物帳)		
1978	Crossroads (十字路)	Junzō Kihara	3 parts
1978	Omoide no Umibe Papa, Boku Shinitakunai!! (想い出の海辺 パパ、ぼく死にたくない!!)		TV film
1978–1979	The Yagyu Conspiracy (柳生一族の陰謀)	Yagyū Jūbei Mitsuyoshi	39 episodes
1978	Yukiyama Sanka Aru Seishun: Tateta! Subereta! (雪山讃歌・ある青春 〜 立てた! 滑れた!)		TV film
1978	Southern Cross (南十字星 コルネリアお雪異聞 わたしの山田長政)	Miyamoto Musashi	TV film
1980	Shadow Warriors (服部半蔵 影の軍団)	Hattori Hanzō III	27 episodes
1980	Tokyo Great Earthquake Magnitude 8.1 (東京大地震マグニチュード8.1)	Kobayashi	TV film
1980–1981	Yagyu Abaretabi (柳生あばれ旅)	Yagyū Jūbei Mitsuyoshi	26 episodes
1981	Keishichō Satsujin-ka (警視庁殺人課)		1 episode
1981–1982	Shadow Warriors II (影の軍団II)	Tsuge Shinpachi	26 episodes
1982–1983	Space Sheriff Gavan (宇宙刑事ギャバン)	Voicer	6 episodes, uncredited
1982	Shadow Warriors III (影の軍団III)	Tarao Hanzō	26 episodes
1982–1983	Yagyu Jubei Abaretabi (柳生十兵衛あばれ旅)	Yagyū Jūbei Mitsuyoshi	26 episodes
1983	Space Sheriff Sharivan (宇宙刑事シャリバン)	Voicer	1 episode, uncredited
1984	Wonderful Circus Guy (素晴らしきサーカス野郎)	Daigaku Maejima	TV film Planning
1985	Shadow Warriors IV (影の軍団IV)	Hattori Hanzō XV	27 episodes
1985	Shadow Warriors: The End of an Era (影の軍団 幕末編)	Hattori Hanzō XV	13 episodes
1986	Shinya ni Yōkoso (深夜にようこそ)	Kōzō Murata	4 parts
1987	Taikoki (太閤記)	Akechi Mitsuhide	TV film
1987	Tomorrow's Snow (雪の朝に)	Dr. Sakamoto	TV film
1987	A Traveling Girl (旅少女)	Takeshi Ishikawa	
1987	Autumn Scenario (秋のシナリオ)	Tatsumi	TV film
1988	Tokugawa Ieyasu (徳川家康)	Ishikawa Kazumasa	TV film
1988	Ryokō keba Renzoku Satsujin (旅行けば連続殺人)	Tetsuya Nanjō	TV film
1989	Oda Nobunaga (織田信長)	Oda Nobuhide	TV film
1989	Iemitsu, Hikoza, and Isshin Tasuke: A National Crisis (家光と彦左と一心太助 天下の一大事)	Yagyū Jūbei Mitsuyoshi	TV film
1989	OL Sennyū! Nippon Fūzoku Meisho (OL潜入! ニッポン風俗名所)	Iwata	TV film
1989	The Days I Saw in My Dreams (夢に見た日々)	Shinsaku Sekimoto	10 episodes
1990	Minamoto Yoshitsune (源義経)	Zenrinbō Kakunichi	TV film
1990	Shingo's Ten Duels (新吾十番勝負)	Umei Tamon	TV film
1990	Ashi de Miru-yama (足で見る山)	Kurahashi	TV film
1990	Seventeen Ninja (十七人の忍者)	Iga no Jingoza	TV film, assistant director
1991	Takeda Shingen (武田信玄)	Takeda Nobutora	TV film
1991	Saito Dosan: Rage of Power (戦国乱世の暴れん坊 斎藤道三 怒涛の天下取り)	Akechi Mitsutsuna	TV film
1992	Tokugawa Buraichō (徳川無頼帳)	Matsudaira Tadateru	24 episodes
1993	Mori Ranmaru: Sengoku o Kake Nuketa Waka Jishi (森蘭丸〜戦国を駆け抜けた若獅子〜)	Mori Sanzaemon Yoshinari	TV film
1996	Legend of St. Dragon (聖龍伝説)	Yūji Saeki	1 episode
1997–1998	Terakoya Yume Shinan (寺子屋ゆめ指南)	Matajūrō Sensui	23 episodes
2001	Shotgun-Marriage (できちゃった結婚)	Ittetsu Kotani	11 episode
2002	Wind and Cloud (風雲)	Lord Conqueror	
2005	Legendary Sword fights of Yagyu Jubei (柳生十兵衛七番勝負)	Miyamoto Musashi	1 episode
2005	Team Astro (アストロ球団)	J. Shuro	
2007	Fūrin Kazan (風林火山)	Itagaki Nobukata	30 episodes
2011	Secret Agent Erika (秘密諜報員 エリカ)	Pastor of St. Francisco Church	1 episode
2014	Owakon TV (おわこんTV)	Genjirō Aramaki	8 episodes

=== Shorts ===
Year	Title	Role	Notes
2013	Ninja Theory (ニンジャセオリー)	Ninja master	Voice
2018	Shakespeare in Tokyo	Calligrapher	

== Theater ==
Year	Title	Role	Notes
1981	Yagyu Jubei Makai Tensho (柳生十兵衛 魔界転生)	Yagyū Jūbei Mitsuyoshi	
1981	Stuntman Story (スタントマン物語)		
1982–1984	The Big Adventure of The Fantastic Pirates (ゆかいな海賊大冒険)	Captain Daedalus	Director
1985	The Drunken Duke (酔いどれ公爵)	Duke Robert	Director; Planning; Original idea
1986	Adventure Youth Departure (アドベンチャー 青春の出発)		Planning Supervision
1986	Stuntman Love Story (スタントマン 愛の物語)		Planning Supervision
1987	Shinichi Chiba's Shadow Warriors (千葉真一奮闘公演 影の軍団)		
2008	Furin Kazan: Harunobu Burning (風林火山 晴信燃ゆ)	Itagaki Nobukata	
2015	Biohazard: The Stage	Ezra Sennett	
