= Etsuko Shihomi =

Japanese actress and flower artist

- 志穂美 悦子
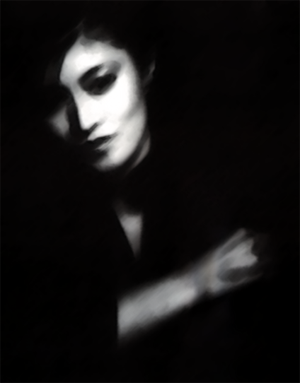
- Born: Etsuko Shiomi 塩見悦子; October 29, 1955 (age 71); Saidaiji, Okayama, Japan
- Other names: Sue Shiomi; Etsuko Nagabuchi (長渕悦子)
- Occupations: Actress, martial artist
- Years active: 1973–1987
- Spouse: Tsuyoshi Nagabuchi
- Children: Ayane (actress); Wataru Nagabuchi (rapper); Ren Nagabuchi (race car driver)
- Website: nagabuchietsuko.com

Etsuko Shihomi (志穂美 悦子, Shihomi Etsuko), born October 29, 1955, in Okayama City, Japan, as Etsuko Shiomi (塩見 悦子, Shiomi Etsuko), now known by her married name Etsuko Nagabuchi (長渕 悦子, Nagabuchi Etsuko), is a Japanese actress and martial artist who appeared in several Japanese martial arts films and samurai film and TV productions of the 1970s and 1980s.

== Life and career ==
A skilled martial artist trained in Karate, Kenjitsu and Shorinji Kempo Etsuko was a member of Sonny Chiba's "Japan Action Club" (JAC) and appeared in several film and TV productions with Chiba, Hiroyuki Sanada, and other members of the JAC, including her big screen debut in Bodyguard Kiba 2 (1973), The Street Fighter (1974), Shorinji Kempo also known misleadingly as Killing Machine (1975), The Gorilla Seven TV series (1975), The Defensive Power of Aikido (1975), Shogun's Samurai (aka The Yagyu Clan Conspiracy) (1978), The Yagyu Conspiracy TV series (1978), Message from Space (1978), Shadow Warriors I-V TV series (1980–1985), Shogun's Ninja (1980), Roaring Fire (1982), and Legend of the Eight Samurai (1983).

Etsuko was also the lead in a number of films and TV series, starring in the Sister Street Fighter trilogy (1974–1975), The 13 Steps of Maki (1975), The Magnificent Chase (1975), Dragon Princess (1976), Lethal Woman: Fifth Level Fist (1976), the Yagyu Jubei Abaretabi TV series (1982–1983) where she reprised her role as Akane Yagyū alongside Sonny Chiba as Jūbei Yagyū from Shogun's Samurai (1978) and The Yagyu Conspiracy (1978), and The Second is a Christian (1985) an action comedy about a nun who becomes the successor to the head of a Yakuza group.

Along with her work in numerous contemporary martial arts and period samurai films and TV programs, Etsuko also appeared in tokusatsu superhero productions like Kikaider 01 (1973–1974) and Moonlight Mask (aka The Moon Mask Rider) (1981), investigative dramas such as Detective of Tomorrow (1977) and Detectives of Rumour: Tommy And Matsu (1979), fantasy films like Black Jack: The Visitor in the Eye (1977) and Exchange Students (1982), and mysteries like The Atami Murder Case (1986).

Etsuko also had a singing career from 1975 to 1984, although her last solo album, Three Dimension, was also released on CD in 1985. Two books were released relating to her in the 1970s and 1980s.

Etsuko met singer-actor Tsuyoshi Nagabuchi on the set of the Otoko wa Tsurai yo film Tora-san's Bluebird Fantasy (1986), when she was around 30 years old. She retired from acting after marrying him the following year, in 1987, when she was 31. Their daughter Ayane Nagabuchi is also an actress.

After her retirement, Etsuko stayed out of the limelight but returned to the public eye in 2011 with the release of her photography book Flower Arrangement INSPIRE and has been involved in charity work. She has written subsequent books on flower arrangement and made a number of public appearances, with the proceeds also being donated to charities.

== Acting credits ==
=== Film ===
Year	Title	Role	Notes
1973	Bodyguard Kiba (ボディガード牙)		Stunt double for Yayoi Watanabe
1973	Bodyguard Kiba 2 (ボディガード牙 必殺三角飛び)	Maki	Acting debut
1974	The Street Fighter (激突! 殺人拳)	Nachi Shikenbaru	
1974	Sister Street Fighter (女必殺拳)	Kōryū Li	
1974	The Street Fighter's Last Revenge (逆襲! 殺人拳)	Kahō	
1974	Sister Street Fighter: Hanging by a Thread (女必殺拳 危機一発)	Kōryū Li	
1974	The Executioner II: Karate Inferno (直撃地獄拳 大逆転)	Kumiko	
1975	The Killing Machine (少林寺拳法)	Miho Tomoda	
1975	13 Steps of Maki (若い貴族たち 13階段のマキ)	Maki Hyūga	
1975	The Magnificent Chase (華麗なる追跡)	Shinobu Yashiro	
1975	The Bullet Train (新幹線大爆破)	Telephone operator	
1975	Champion of Death (けんか空手 極真拳)	Geisha	Uncredited
1975	The Return of the Sister Street Fighter (帰ってきた女必殺拳)	Kōryū Li	
1975	The Defensive Power of Aikido (激突! 合気道)	Sanae Ozaki	
1976	Dragon Princess (必殺女拳士)	Yumi Higaki	
1976	Karate Warriors (子連れ殺人拳)	Fisherman	Uncredited
1976	Sister Street Fighter: Fifth Level Fist (女必殺五段拳)	Kiku Nakagawa	
1976	Festival Champ (お祭り野郎 魚河岸の兄弟分)	Kiyoko Ebihara	
1977	Soul of Chiba (激殺! 邪道拳)	Liho	
1977	Golgo 13: Assignment Kowloon (ゴルゴ13 九竜の首)	Lin Ling	
1977	Black Jack: The Visitor in the Eye (BLACK JACK 瞳の中の訪問者)	Kyōko Nanbu	
1978	Shogun's Samurai (柳生一族の陰謀)	Akane Yagyū	
1978	Message from Space (宇宙からのメッセージ)	Emeralida	
1979	Hong Kong Connection (ホンコン・コネクション)	Emeralida Shihomi	Student film; special appearance
1979	The Adventures of Kosuke Kindaichi (金田一耕助の冒険)	Neighbor	
1979	Pepper '80 (ピーマン80)	Detective Shiho Yamaguchi	
1980	Shogun's Ninja (忍者武芸帖 百地三太夫)	Ai-Lian	
1981	Moonlight Mask (月光仮面)	Ikuko Makimura	
1981	Roaring Fire (吼えろ鉄拳)	Chihiro Hinohara	
1981	The Kamikaze Adventurer (冒険者カミカゼ -ADVENTURER KAMIKAZE-)	Sommelière	Uncredited
1982	Tenkōsei (転校生)	Mitsuko Ōno	
1982	Fall Guy (蒲田行進曲)		As herself
1983	Igano Kabamaru (伊賀野カバ丸)	Yūko Azuki	
1983	Legend of the Eight Samurai (里見八犬伝)	Keno Inusaka	
1984	Kōtarō Makaritōru! (コータローまかりとおる!)	Benibara	
1984	Shanghai Rhapsody (上海バンスキング)	Lin Zhuli	
1984	The Audition (ザ・オーディション)	Reiko Nanase	
1985	The Second is a Christian (二代目はクリスチャン)	Sister Kyōko	
1986	Cabaret (キャバレー)	Pub Mama	
1986	The Atami Murder Case (熱海殺人事件)	Tomoko Mizuno	
1986	Tora-san's Bluebird Fantasy (男はつらいよ 幸福の青い鳥)	Miho Shimazaki	

=== Television ===
Year	Title	Role	Notes
1973	Suspense Series: Modern Witch Tale Murderous Love (サスペンスシリーズ 現代鬼婆考 殺愛)	Shige's sister	1 episode/Ep. 25
1973–1974	Kikaider 01 (キカイダー01)	Mari (Bijinder)	17 episodes
1974	The Bodyguard (ザ・ボディガード)	Jun Niimi	
1975	The Gorilla Seven (ザ★ゴリラ7)	Michi Nagareya	
1975	The Young Detective (刑事くん)	Yuka	1 episode/Ep. 40 of season 3
1975	Kenka Yasubei (けんか安兵衛)	Omame	1 episode/Ep. 21
1975–1976	Blazing Dragnet (燃える捜査網)	Akiko Shiratori	14 episodes
1976	Emergency Line (大非常線)	Midori Katsuragi	
1976	Nanairo Tongarashi (七色とんがらし)	Takeko	
1976	The Young Detective (刑事くん)	Miki Inaba	1 episode/Ep. 7 of season 4
1976	Detective at Dawn (夜明けの刑事)		1 episode/Ep. 86
1976–1977	Ōedo Sōsamō (大江戸捜査網)	Undercover Agent Kaze (Oshin)	38 episodes
1977	J.A.K.Q. Dengekitai (ジャッカー電撃隊)	Natsuko Ono	1 episode/Ep. 3
1977	Shin Kawaramachi Higashiiru (新・河原町東入ル)	Natsuko Ōkawara	2 episodes/Ep. 19, 20
1977	New Detective at Dawn (新・夜明けの刑事)	Etsuko Shimura	1 episode/Ep. 17
1977	Shingo Tondeke Torimonochō (新伍とんでけ捕物帳)	Miho Kanzaki	
1977	Circus (サーカス)	Ruriko Adachi	1 episod/Ep. 7
1977	Cases Files of Ningyo Sashichi (人形佐七捕物帳)	Koyuki	1 episode/Ep. 34
1977–1979	Detective of Tomorrow (明日の刑事)	Detective Shiho Yamaguchi	
1978—1979	The Yagyu Conspiracy (柳生一族の陰謀)	Akane Yagyū	31 episodes
1978—1979	Necchu Jidai (熱中時代)	Momoko Koito	
1978—1979	Sanshiro Sugata (姿三四郎)	Sumi Monma (Osumi)	
1979	Yaruki Manman (やる気満々)	Mayumi (真弓)	
1979	Tejo o Kakeru (手錠をかけろ!)	Akiko Uno	1 episode/Ep. 10
1979—1980	Sannan Sanjo Muko Ippiki III (三男三女婿一匹III)	Tsutae Katsura	
1979—1980	Detectives of Rumour: Tommy and Matsu (噂の刑事トミーとマツ)	Sachiko Okano	22 episodes
1980	Kyo Maiko Satsujin Jiken: Kyofu no Uwaki Shuccho (京舞妓殺人事件 恐怖の浮気出張)		TV film/special appearance
1980	Doberman Deka (爆走!ドーベルマン刑事)	Detective Kaoru Igarashi	13 episodes
1980	Juni-sai no Haato ni Suberi Kome (11歳のハートにすべり込め!)		1 episode/Ep. 5
1980	Shadow Warriors (服部半蔵 影の軍団)	Kuromoji no Kirara	1 episode/Ep. 9
1980	Umi Yo Ai no Kiseki O Yobe Tozasareta Shōnen no Kokoro Wa Yomigaeru Ka? (海よ愛の奇跡を呼べ 閉ざされた少年の心は甦るか?)		TV film
1980–1981	Hitori Goi Futari Goi Minna Goi (一人来い二人来いみんな来い)	Takako	
1981	Red Lightning: The Shadow Ninja Warriors Strategy to Save Shogun Yoshimune's Mother! 赤い稲妻 将軍吉宗の母を救え!影の忍者軍団決死の(秘)作戦)		TV film
1981	Yagyu Abaretabi (柳生あばれ旅)	Oyo Kashiwagi	1 episode/Ep. 22
1981	Hitomi no Naka no Satsui Kekkonshitai Onna (瞳の中の殺意 結婚したい女)		TV film
1981	Ki ni Naru Tenshi-tachi (気になる天使たち)		
1981–1982	Shadow Warriors II (影の軍団II)	Misato Shiina	9 episodes
1982	Okubo Hikozaemon: The Obstinate Old Man (天下御免の頑固おやじ 大久保彦左衛門)	Onaka	TV film
1982	Onmitsu Kuzure II: Lullaby From Hell (隠密くずれII 地獄の子守唄)	Shizu	TV film
1982	Shadow Warriors III (影の軍団III)	Tezuma no Ochō	15 episodes
1982	Kirisute Gomen! (斬り捨て御免!)	Osae	1 episode/Ep. 2 of season 3
1982–1983	Yagyu Jubei Abaretabi (柳生十兵衛あばれ旅)	Akane Yagyū	26 episodes/lead
1983	Apron Obasan (エプロンおばさん)	Haruko	1 episode/Ep. 13
1983	Tenshi no Fukushū (天使の復讐)		TV film
1983	Pounding Policewoman (どきどき婦警さん)		TV film
1983	Seishun Zengofukaku (青春前後不覚)		
1983	Mito Kōmon (水戸黄門)	Teru-hime / Komatayū Ichimura	1 episode/Ep. 3 of season 14
1984	Wonderful Circus Guy (素晴らしきサーカス野郎)	Yukari	TV film
1984	Bark at the Sun! (太陽にほえろ!)	Keiko Matsumoto	1 episode/Ep. 590
1984	Kinyōbi no Tsuma-tachi e II, Otoko-tachi yo, Genki Kai? (金曜日の妻たちへII、男たちよ、元気かい?)	Chika Ōishi	
1984	Oretachi no Atsui Kaze (俺たちの熱い風)		TV film
1984	Abare Kyūan (暴れ九庵)	Oyū	1 episode/Ep. 13
1985	Dark Window (暗い窓)	Misuho Kishida	TV film
1985	Shadow Warriors IV (影の軍団IV)	Oren	5 episodes
1985	Abduction Scramble (誘拐スクランブル)		TV film
1985	Red Shadow: The Masked Ninja (仮面の忍者 赤影)	Mai-hime	TV film
1985	Shadow Warriors (影の軍団 幕末編)	Oren	2 episodes/Ep. 7,9
1986	Tonderu Keishi (翔んでる警視)	Mizue Shimura	TV film
1986	Oyako Game (親子ゲーム)	Kayo Mitsuishi	
1987	Tekidōshi Sukidōshi (敵同志好き同志)	Michi Asai (浅井未知)	
1987	Soreyuke Kujaku Keishi (それゆけ孔雀警視)	Shōko Ōgino	TV film
1987	Sutandobaimī Kimagure Hakusho (スタンドバイミー 〜気まぐれ白書〜)	Toshiko Kurata (倉田利子)	

=== Theater ===
Year	Title	Role	Theater	Notes
1981	Yagyu Jubei Makai Tensho (柳生十兵衛 魔界転生)	Amakusa Shirō	Shinjuku Koma Theater (新宿コマ劇場)	Performed simultaneously with Stuntman Story
1981	Stuntman Story (スタントマン物語)		Shinjuku Koma Theater (新宿コマ劇場)	Performed simultaneously with Yagyu Jubei Makai Tensho
1982–1984	The Big Adventure of The Fantastic Pirates (ゆかいな海賊大冒険)	Princess Miranda / Claire (Note: Only played the part of "Claire" in the 1984 run of the show)	Shinjuku Koma Theater (新宿コマ劇場)	
1984	Oh! I Feel Like a Sexy Boy (Oh! 気分は聖xy Boy)	Susie, George, Herbie	Theatre Apple (シアターアプル)	Lead
1985	The Drunken Duke (酔いどれ公爵)	Nathalie Galfan	Shinjuku Koma Theater (新宿コマ劇場)	
1986	Adventure Youth Departure (アドベンチャー 青春の出発)		Shinjuku Koma Theater (新宿コマ劇場)	Performed simultaneously with Stuntman Love Story
1986	Stuntman Love Story (スタントマン 愛の物語)		Shinjuku Koma Theater (新宿コマ劇場)	Performed simultaneously with Adventure Youth Departure
1986	The Taming of the Shrew (じゃじゃ馬ならし)	Katherina	Parco Theater (パルコ劇場)	Lead

== Miscellaneous ==
=== Discography ===
Singles:

- 13 Steps of Maki – 13階段のマキ (1975)
- Silhouette – 影法師 (1975)
- Saturday Night of Love – 恋のサタディー・ナイト (1977)
- Only Two at the Wedding – ふたりだけの結婚式 (1977)
- I dance like tomorrow – 明日よ風に舞え (1982)
- Airmail in the Southern Sands – 南のーー砂のエアメール (1984)

Albums:

- Female Killing Fist – Calling on Etsuko Shihomi!! – 女必殺拳 志穂美悦子参上!! (1976)
- Saturday Night of Love – 恋のサタディー・ナイト (1977)
- Three Dimension (1983) (also released on CD in 1985)

=== Books ===
- Shihomi Etsuko : Endless Road to action (1976)
- Actress : Shihomi Etsuko (1981)
- Flower Arrangement INSPIRE 〜いちかばちか〜 Vol.1 (2011)
- Flower Fighting INSPIRE 〜いちかばちか〜 Vol.2 (2012)
- Flower Arrangement Works INSPIRE 3 In New York (2013)
