= Sister Street Fighter: Hanging by a Thread =

Sister Street Fighter: Hanging by a Thread 女必殺拳 危機一髪
- Film poster
- Directed by: Kazuhiko Yamaguchi
- Written by: Masahiro Kakefuda; Norifumi Suzuki
- Starring: Etsuko Shihomi; Yasuaki Kurata
- Cinematography: Yoshio Nakajima
- Music by: Shunsuke Kikuchi
- Distributed by: Toei Company
- Release date: 7 December 1974
- Running time: 87 minutes
- Country: Japan
- Language: Japanese

Sister Street Fighter: Hanging by a Thread (女必殺拳 危機一髪, On'na Hissatsu-ken: Kiki Ippatsu) is a Japanese martial arts directed by Kazuhiko Yamaguchi and starring Etsuko Shihomi. The film is a sequel to Sister Street Fighter. It was followed by a third and final film titled The Return of the Sister Street Fighter (1975).

== Cast ==
- Etsuko Shihomi - Lǐ Hónglóng (Li Kōryū)
- Yasuaki Kurata - Shunsuke Tsubaki
- Tamayo Mitsukawa - Li Bailan (Li Hakuran)
- Michiyo Bandō - Kotoe Fujita
- Hisayo Tanaka - Wang Meili (Ō Birei)
- Hideo Murota - Kazushige Osone
- Kōji Fujiyama - Goro Kuroki
- Kōji Hio - Kiyoshi Nezu
- Masashi Ishibashi - Inoichiro Honiden
- Kazuyuki Saito - Shikajiro Honiden
- Daikyo Rin - Chozaburo Honiden
- Riki Harada - Cui Chiniu
- Kanya Tsukasa - Byakko
- Osamu Kaneda - Konosuke Mayuzumi
- Rikiya Yasuoka - Genjuro Ranai

== Reception ==
Jim McLennan from the website girlswithguns.org gave the film two and a half stars out of four, criticizing its lack of originality, writing, "...if you watch this back to back with the original, it's almost going to seem like a mockbuster rather than a sequel, albeit made by much the same people. One semi-significant difference is that replacing Sonny Chiba, you have Kurata, playing a martial-arts master who joins the Osone gang with his own agenda. The opponents for our heroine are still the same selection of fighters with different talents, each introduced with a caption describing their origin. But these seem significantly more restrained than first time round, outside of the transsexual killer with her lethal fingernails".

Don Anelli of asianmoviepulse.com opined, "While on the surface providing pretty much exactly what's needed in terms of fine martial arts battles and a simplistic story to set that up, Sister Street Fighter 2 comes off as a lower version of the original in most regards. As it's still worthwhile and watchable, give this a chance if you're a fan of the first one or a general film of these kinds of films from that era, while viewers who aren't into martial arts efforts or weren't fans of the original should heed caution".
