= Sister Street Fighter: Fifth Level Fist =

- Film poster
- Directed by: Shigehiro Ozawa
- Written by: Isao Matsumoto; Motohiro Torii
- Starring: Etsuko Shihomi
- Distributed by: Toei Company
- Release date: May 29, 1976 (Japan)
- Running time: 87 minutes
- Country: Japan
- Language: Japanese

Sister Street Fighter: Fifth Level Fist (Japanese: 女必殺五段拳, Hepburn: Onna Hissatsu Godan Ken) is a 1976 Japanese martial arts film and an unofficial sequel of sorts to The Return of the Sister Street Fighter.

== Plot ==
Kiku is the daughter of kimono manufacturers in Kyoto. Her parents desperately want her to find a husband, but she prefers to practice martial arts on her own with no interest in dating. Nearby, a movie studio operates a clandestine drug trade, hiding cocaine in Buddhist statues that are sold by art galleries to Americans. One of their American contacts warns them that the police are wise to the operation, and are sending U.S. agents to investigate.

Kiku has a best friend, Michi, whose half-brother Jim is Black - their mother sired children to a white and Black American respectively. Jim has been working as muscle for the studio's drug operation, but is eliminated by them when they determine he's been identified by police. Michi tries to get revenge against the heads of the organization, but is quickly captured. Kiku goes on her own to infiltrate the gang, find her friend, and avenge the brother's death.

== Cast ==
- Etsuko Shihomi - Kiku Nakagawa
- Nobuo Kawai
