= Jirō Yabuki =

Japanese actor

- Born: Mitsuho Maeda; 6 January 1949 (age 77); Kimitsu, Chiba, Japan
- Occupation: Actor
- Years active: 1967–1982
- Relatives: Sonny Chiba (brother); Juri Manase (niece); Mackenyu (nephew); Gordon Maeda (nephew)

Jirō Yabuki (矢吹二朗, Yabuki Jirō; born Mitsuho Maeda, 6 January 1949) also known as Jirō Chiba is a retired Japanese actor. His older brother was Sonny Chiba. He is known for playing the role of Kazuya Taki in the tokusatsu superhero series Kamen Rider.

He started his acting career at the Bungakuza theatre company in 1967. In 1970, he joined Sonny Chiba's production company and often co-starred with Sonny in many films. His first starring role in the film was in Gekitotsu! Aikidō. In 1976, he changed his stage name from Jirō Chiba to Jirō Yabuki.

He announced his retirement as an actor in 1982.

== Filmography ==
=== Film ===
- The Assassin (1970) as Jirō
- Kamikaze Cop, The Poison Gas Affair or International Secret Police : Death Gas (1971)
- Kigeki Ijiwaru Daishōgai (1971)
- Kamen Rider vs. Shocker (1972) as Kazuya Taki
- Kamen Rider vs. Ambassador Hell (1972) as Kazuya Taki
- The Street Fighter (1974) as Gijun Shikenbaru
- The Bullet Train (1975) as Officer
- Champion of Death (1975) as Ogano Genpachirō
- The Return of the Sister Street Fighter (1975) as Xiang De-Ki (Sho Tokki)
- Gekitotsu! Aikidō (1975) as Morihei Ueshiba
- Machine Gun Dragon (1976) as Jirō Segawa
- Dragon Princess (1976) as Jirō Chinen
- The Rugby Star (1976) as Jirō Yabuki
- Karate vs Tiger (1976) as Makoto Karaki
- Terror of Yakuza (1976) as Tetsuo Chibana
- Yakuza Graveyard (1976) as Hideo Wakamoto
- Hokuriku Proxy War (1976) as Hanamaki
- Tree of Youth (1977) as Hiroshi Waku
- Circuit no Ōkami (1977) as Okita
- Yakuza Sensō Nihonno Don (1977) as Gundai Harita
- Sanshiro Sugata (1977) as Tesshin Higaki
- Shogun's Samurai (1978) as Yagyū Samon Taira-no-Tomonori
- The Okinawa War of Ten Years (1978) as Noboru Ishiura
- Kagemusha (1980) as Equestrian
- The Battle of Port Arthur (1980) as Kuji
- The Blazing Valiant (1981) as Fumio Sakamoto
- Eijanaika (1981) as Senmatsu
- The Gate of Youth: Part 2 (1982) as Ryuji Hamazaki
- Farewell to the Land (1982) as Akihiko Yamazawa
- Tattoo Ari (1982) as Teruya Shimada

=== Television ===
- Ōedo Sōsamō (1971) (Guest ep.25) as Sakichi
- Kamen Rider (1971) as Kazuya Taki
- Kikaider 01 (1974) (Guest ep.43 and 44) as Eisuke Tōge
- Robot Detective (1973) as Tsuyoshi Shinjō
- The Bodyguard (1974) as Jirō Kurata
- The Gorilla Seven (1975) as Tadashi Mannen
- Akumaizer 3 (1975) as Ippei Shima
- Kaiketsu Zubat (1977) (Guest ep.31 and 32)
- G-Men '75 (1977, 1979) (Guest ep.128 and 221)
- Daitokai season2 (1978) (Guest ep.47) as Akira Sugiyama
- Taiyō ni Hoero! (1978, 1981) (Guest ep.312 and 488)
- Ōgon no Hibi (1978) as Hattori Hanzō
- The Yagyu Conspiracy (1978) as Fuchikari
- Doberman Deka (1980) as Kyosuke Hirata
- Hissatsu Shigotonin (1980) (Guest ep.75) as Einoshin Tachiki
- Seibu Keisatsu (1981) (Guest ep.104) as Noboru Akimoto
- Kage no Gundan season2 (1981) (Guest ep.7) as Kikumaru
