= Nobuo Kawai =

Japanese actor (1932–2006)

- Born: 18 April 1932; Aichi Prefecture, Japan
- Died: 24 June 2006 (aged 74)
- Occupation: Actor
- Years active: 1959–2003

Nobuo Kawai (川合伸旺, Kawai Nobuo; 18 April 1932 – 24 June 2006) was a Japanese actor. He is most famous for playing villains and appeared in many jidaigeki and detective television dramas as a guest. He was a member of Yukio Mishima's Roman Gekijo Theatre Company.

He died of cerebral infarction at the age of 74.

== Biography ==
Kawai voice type is baritone as a voice actor, he has been active since the early days of ateleco, dubbing James Dean and Marlon Brando in western movies, and playing orthodox roles that are the opposite of the villain image shown in period dramas. In particular, Paul Newman's dubbing was almost exclusively done by him because of his "similar mood". He was also in charge of dubbing Toshiro Mifune in the western film Red Sun, when Mifune himself asked him to "do it by all".

== Personality ==
In private, he was a very friendly and calm person, not to be seen in Edo period dramas (children who were going to walk in the street shouted "He's a bad officer!" Even if he was called out, he never looked disgusting, and he answered by waving with a smile.) Kawai himself said, "Even if the children didn't know my name, they just looked at my face and said, 'He's a bad officer in a Edo period drama!'" I'm very happy as an actor."

== Filmography ==
=== Films ===
- Bushido, Samurai Saga (1963)
- The Street Fighter (1974)
- Sister Street Fighter – Fifth Level Fist (1976)
- Mito Kōmon (1978)
- The Battle of Port Arthur (1980)
- The Man in White (2003)

=== Television drama ===
- Mito Kōmon (1971~2003) 55 appearances as a Guest
- Ronin of the Wilderness (1972) episode 12,32,65 Guest starring
- Kogarashi Monjirō (1972) episode 8 Guest starring
- Nemuri Kyōshirō (1972 TV series) episode 13 Guest starring
- Hissatsu Shiokinin (1972) episode 14 Guest starring
- The Water Margin (1973)
- Taiyō ni Hoero! (1973~1976) episode 38,61,220 Guest starring
- G-Men '75 (1977~82) episode 113,144,199,221,245,296,351 Guest starring
- Hissatsu Shiokiya Kagyō (1975) episode 5 Guest starring
- Shin Hissatsu Shiokinin (1977) episode 19,32, Guest starring
- The Unfettered Shogun (1978–2002) 28 appearances as a Guest
- Akō Rōshi (1979) as Fujii Mataemon

=== Dubbing ===
- The Sting – Henry "Shaw" Gondorff (Paul Newman)
- The Towering Inferno (1979 Fuji TV edition) – Doug Roberts (Paul Newman)
