= The Yagyu Conspiracy =

- Also known as: 柳生一族の陰謀
- Genre: Jidaigeki
- Directed by: Kinji Fukasaku; Eiichi Kudo
- Starring: Shinichi Chiba; So Yamamura; Etsuko Shihomi; Yūki Meguro; Mikio Narita; Hiroyuki Sanada
- Narrated by: Mizuho Suzuki
- Theme music composer: Toshiaki Tsushima
- Country of origin: Japan
- Original language: Japanese
- No. of episodes: 39

Production
- Running time: 45 minutes (per episode)
- Production company: Toei

Original release
- Network: Kansai
- Release: October 3, 1978 – June 26, 1979

The Yagyu Conspiracy (柳生一族の陰謀, Yagyū ichizoku no inbō) is a Japanese television jidaigeki (period drama) that was broadcast from 1978 to 1979. It is adapted from the 1978 film Shogun's Samurai starring Sonny Chiba, who reprises his role in the series.

== Plot ==
After the death of Tokugawa Hidetada, his sons Tokugawa Iemitsu and Tokugawa Tadanaga begin to fight over the inheritance. The Yagyu clan of Edo, led by Yagyū Munenori, supports Iemitsu, and Iemitsu is eventually appointed the third shogun. However, Nobutsuna Matsudaira fears the Yagyu clan and tries to prevent them from gaining power. On the other hand, Shōshō Ayamaro Karasuma, who tried to divide the Tokugawa shogunate due to the conflict between Iemitsu and Tadanaga, has not given up that hope.

Anti-shogunate factions and forces appear one after another and challenge the Tokugawa shogunate. Yagyu Jubei and his subordinates defeat the enemies of the shogunate one by one as ordered by Nobutsuna Matsudaira and Yagyu Munenori, but Jubei gradually begins to question the policies of the Tokugawa shogunate.

== Cast ==
- Shinichi Chiba as Jūbei Mitsuyoshi Yagyū
- So Yamamura as Tajima-no-kami Munenori Yagyū
- Etsuko Shihomi as Akane Yagyū
- Yūki Meguro as Samon Tomonori Yagyū
- Hiroyuki Sanada as Matahei
- Mikio Narita as Shōshō Ayamaro Karasuma
- Ryo Tamura as Iemitsu Tokugawa
- Etsushi Takahashi as Izu-no-kami Nobutsuna Matsudaira
- Jirō Yabuki as Fuchikari
- Seizō Fukumoto as Kitano
- Yumi Takigawa as Okuni
- Asao Koike as Negoro Sagenta
- Toshio Takahara as Kujō Michifusa
- Junichi Haruta as Hayate
- Shingo Yamashiro as Sanjonishi Saneeda
- Ken Nishida as Tokugawa Tadanaga
- Michiyo Kogure as Oeyo
- Kōji Nanbara as Ogasawara Nagaharu
- Gajirō Satō as Kakuno Hikosaburō
- Fumio Watanabe as Sakai Tadatomo (ep.1-3)
- Mariko Okada as Lady Kasuga (ep.1,3 and 4)

== Episodes ==
- 1. Shōgun dokusatsu directed by Kinji Fukasaku
- 2. Bijo no ikenie directed by Akinori Matsuo
- 3. Sunpu no kuroikage directed by Kazuo Ikehiro
- 4. Ooku no yōjo directed by Kazuo Ikehiro
- 5. Hitjichi kyuhitsushirei directed by Ryuichi Takamori
- 6. Negoro ninja wa shinazu directed by Kazuo Ikehiro
- 7. Akurei no shirp directed by Akinori Matsuo
- 8. Mehyō no hada directed by Akinori Matsuo
- 9. Hatamoto no don directed by Kazuo Ikehiro
- 10. Chinurareta konrei directed by Kazuo Ikehiro
- 11. Maboroshi no konketsubijo directed by Akinori Matsuo
- 12. Akai hanaga shiwoyonnda directed by Yoshiyuki Kuroda
- 13. Nankai no megitsune directed by Yoshiyuki Kuroda
- 14. Mashō no yakata directed by Akinori Matsuo
- 15. Furuino yōtō directed by Yuji Makiguchi
- 16. Yogirini kijogafuewofuku directed by Akinori Matsuo
- 17. Shiroi Dokugumo directed by Yuji Makiguchi
- 18. Hōchōbana wa koroshino nioi directed by Ryuichi Takamori
- 19. Kami o wana directed by Akinori Matsuo
- 20. Hanano yoshiwarade nanikagaokoru directed by Eiichi Kudo
- 21. Yuyakeni uramiga nokotta directed by Eiichi Kudo
- 22. Jigokuwomita onna directed by Ryuichi Takamori
- 23. Miyamotomusashi no kuiwotore directed by Yoshiyuki Kuroda
- 24. Akaibaraniwa tewodasuna directed by Yuji Makigchi
- 25. Kinjirareta satsui directed by Yoshiyuki Kuroda
- 26. Yureisento kieta jyusannin directed by Akinori Matsuo
- 27. Bijo to yajyu directed by Yuji Makiguchi
- 28. Yaminihikaru me directed by Akinori Matsuo
- 29. Kunoichi no missho directed by Yuji Makiguchi
- 30. Ikiteita kagemusha directed by Yoshiyuki Kuroda
- 31. Noroi no rōningyō directed by Yoshiyuki Kuroda
- 32. Sugatanaki teki directed by Seikō Shimura
- 33. Kuroneko no Kyōfu directed by Seikō Shimura
- 34. Yawahada no himitsu directed by Akinori Matsuo
- 35. Bōreiwa shinyani susurinaku directed by Akinori Matsuo
- 36. Karasuma shōshō no saiki directed by Yoshiyuki Kuroda
- 37. Yagyūke saidai no kiki directed by Yoshiyuki Kuroda
- 38. Jyubei wo kurose directed by Yuji Makiguchi
- 39. Saraba Yagyū directed by Yuji Makiguchi

== See also ==
- Shogun's Samurai (1978)
