= Tora-san's Bluebird Fantasy =

- Theatrical poster
- Directed by: Yoji Yamada
- Written by: Yoji Yamada; Yoshitaka Asama
- Produced by: Kiyoshi Shimizu; Shigehiro Nakagawa
- Starring: Kiyoshi Atsumi; Etsuko Shihomi
- Cinematography: Tetsuo Takaba
- Edited by: Iwao Ishii
- Music by: Naozumi Yamamoto
- Distributed by: Shochiku
- Release date: December 20, 1986
- Running time: 102 minutes
- Country: Japan
- Language: Japanese

Tora-san's Bluebird Fantasy (男はつらいよ 幸福の青い鳥, Otoko wa Tsurai yo: Shiawase no Aoi Tori) aka Tora-san, Bluebird of Happiness is a 1986 Japanese comedy film directed by Yoji Yamada. It stars Kiyoshi Atsumi as Torajirō Kuruma (Tora-san), and Etsuko Shihomi as his love interest or "Madonna". Tora-san's Bluebird Fantasy is the thirty-seventh entry in the popular, long-running Otoko wa Tsurai yo series.

== Synopsis ==
During his travels, Tora-san comes across a traditional theater he used to visit, and discovers that one of his old friends has died. Tora-san and his family help the friend's daughter, who becomes romantically involved with an aspiring artist.

== Cast ==
- Kiyoshi Atsumi as Torajirō
- Chieko Baisho as Sakura
- Etsuko Shihomi as Miho Shimazaki
- Tsuyoshi Nagabuchi as Kengo Kurata
- Shimojo Masami as Kuruma Tatsuzō
- Chieko Misaki as Tsune Kuruma (Torajiro's aunt)
- Gin Maeda as Hiroshi Suwa
- Hidetaka Yoshioka as Mitsuo Suwa
- Hisao Dazai as Boss (Umetarō Katsura)
- Gajirō Satō as Genkō
- Chishū Ryū as Gozen-sama
- Jun Miho as Akemi
- Issei Ogata

== Critical appraisal ==
Stuart Galbraith IV judges this to be one of the weaker entries in the Otoko wa Tsurai yo series, but still recommended. Perhaps the most notable aspect of the film is that the co-star, Etsuko Shihomi, was the star of the Sister Street Fighter series. It was on the set of Tora-san's Bluebird Fantasy that she met Tsuyoshi Nagabuchi, whom she married the following year. The German-language site molodezhnaja gives Tora-san's Bluebird Fantasy three and a half out of five stars.

== Availability ==
Tora-san's Bluebird Fantasy was released theatrically on December 20, 1986. In Japan, the film was released on videotape in 1988 and 1996, and in DVD format in 2005 and 2008.

== Bibliography ==
=== English ===
- Galbraith IV, Stuart (2007-02-16). "Tora-san 37: Tora-san's Bluebird Fantasy (Region 3)". DVD Talk.
- "Tora-san's Bluebird Fantasy". The Hollywood Reporter. 297 (May 1987): 3, 9. 1987-05-13.
- "OTOKO WA TSURAI YO SHIAWASE NO AOI TORI (1986)". British Film Institute. Archived from the original on 2012-10-17.
- "OTOKO WA TSURAIYO -SHIAWASE NO AOITORI". Complete Index to World Film.
- Otoko wa tsurai yo: Shiawase no aoi tori (1986) at IMDb
- "'Tora-san' bringing in new year with 37th film". Pacific Stars and Stripes. 1987-01-11.

=== German ===
- "Tora-San's Bluebird Fantasy" (in German). www.molodezhnaja.ch.

=== Japanese ===
- 男はつらいよ 幸福の青い鳥 (1986) (in Japanese). allcinema.net.
- "男はつらいよ 幸福の青い鳥". Japanese Cinema Database (Agency for Cultural Affairs). Archived from the original on 2012-03-11.
- 男はつらいよ 幸福の青い鳥 (in Japanese). Japanese Movie Database.
- 男はつらいよ 幸福の青い鳥 (in Japanese). Kinema Junpo. Archived from the original on 2012-03-24.
