= Bodyguard Kiba 2 (1973 film) =

- Theatrical release poster
- Directed by: Ryuichi Takamori
- Written by: Ryūzō Nakanishi
- Based on: Bodyguard Kiba manga by: Ikki Kajiwara; Ken Nakagusuku
- Starring: Sonny Chiba
- Cinematography: Yoshikazu Yamazawa
- Music by: Toshiaki Tsushima
- Production company: Toei Tokyo
- Distributed by: Toei Company
- Release date: October 13, 1973 (Japan)
- Running time: 88 minutes
- Country: Japan
- Language: Japanese

Bodyguard Kiba 2 (Japanese: ボディガード牙 必殺三角飛び, Hepburn: Bodigaado Kiba: Hissatsu sankaku tobi) is a 1973 Japanese martial arts film starring Sonny Chiba. It is the sequel to the earlier 1973 film Bodyguard Kiba based on an action manga by Ikki Kajiwara. Etsuko Shihomi makes her screen acting debut, replacing actress Yayoi Watanabe in the role of Naoto Kiba's sister Maki. Shihomi had previously worked as a stunt double for Watanabe in the earlier film Bodyguard Kiba. The movie is also considered a breakthrough for Masashi Ishibashi, who would be asked by Sonny Chiba to play a major role in the 1974 movie The Street Fighter.

== Plot summary ==
After Kiba Naoto wins the title at a karate tournament, the Kikoku-ryu school disputes the victory and send a letter of challenge to his master Daito Tetsugen. Kiba wins the illegal duel to the death but his sister Maki is given a blinding injury by one of the opponents and Kiba is kicked out of the Tesshinkai karate school and jailed for participating in it.

Upon his release, Kiba is recruited by Akamatsu, the owner of the Nightclub Plaza, to be his personal bodyguard so that he can sever ties with the yakuza operating as the "protection" in his establishment led by Tatsumi and his goons, including enforcer Ryuzuka of the Kikoku-ryu. Tatsumi is insulted and complains to Karasaki, who insists that there is to be no conflict between him and Akamatsu in order to avoid breaking the promise the three made to each other to conceal a crime they committed years earlier. Kiba develops feelings for an Okinawan singer at the nightclub named Mari but after she is raped by Tatsumi and his men she accuses Kiba of being in league with them.

The Okinawan Nanjo, one of Kiba's former fellow inmates, arrives and is revealed to be an associate of the three men and Mari's lover. Karasaki offers him 30 million yen for his troubles, but he demands a fourth of what they are all worth because they made their wealth from his money while he spent three years in prison. He then threatens to reveal the crime they are all concealing. Akamatsu is reluctant to pay and agrees to work under Karasaki like before in return for his help.

Nanjo deduces that Mari was raped by Tatsumi, so he attacks the other three men with traditional Okinawan usugama at their next meeting. Kiba stops Nanjo from killing them, but when Mira joins in Kiba switches sides and helps the two Okinawans escape. Nanjo explains that he and the others along with a Korean named Kim killed three American MPs years earlier to steal the $420,000 they were transporting. The others paid Kim 1 million yen to kill Nanjo, but Nanjo instead killed Kim with an usugama and was sent to prison, vowing to return to crush the other three men.

Kiba returns to Karasaki, Akamatsu, and Tatsumi and advises them to pay off Nanjo, but Tatsumi's thugs trick Nanjo into following them to a location where they blind and kill him. After Mari and Kiba find the body with the help of the nightclub's heroin-addicted drummer, they confront the three men and their goons, but Karasaki's enforcer Karasuda and the nightclub's drug dealer Mika arrive with Kiba's sister Maki, whose eyes have recovered, and threaten to kill her. The drummer stabs and kills Mika, then Mari, Maki, and Kiba defeat the others. Ryuzuka blinds Kiba by clawing his eyes with metal finger claws, so Mika uses clock times to tell Kiba where to strike, helping him defeat his final enemy.

In the final scene, Mari holds Nanjo's ashes as she takes a boat back to Okinawa. Maki teases Kiba that he was in love with Mari. He denies it, but she says that she can see it. They both laugh as the boat sails away.

== Cast ==
- Shin'ichi Chiba as Naoto Kiba
- Tsunehiko Watase as Takeshi Nanjo
- Maki Mizuhara as Mari Arakaki
- Akiyoshi Fukae as Noboru Akamatsu
- Hideo Murota as Masaru Tatsumi
- Rokkō Toura as Gen Karasaki
- Eiji Gō as Ryuzuka
- Hiroshi Minami as Johnny Uchida
- Yukiko Kuwahara as Mika
- Etsuko Shihomi as Maki
- Toshiyuki Tsuchiyama as Kameishi
- Rikiya Yasuoka as Kanbe
- Takeshige Hatanaka as Kuroki
- Takashi Hio as Karasuda
- Keiko Kuni as Yae
- Chie Kobayashi as Yoko
- Kengo Miyaji as Bartender
- Akira Kuji as Kim
- Katsuyo Sunaga as Nurse
- Masashi Ishibashi as Kazuki Samejima
- Yoshimasa Sato as Kikoku-Ryu
- Gōzō Sōma as Kikoku-Ryu
- Chū Takatsuki as Kikoku-Ryu
- Natsuko Okada as Prostitute
- Masutatsu Oyama as Tetsugen Daito

== Reception and analysis ==
In his book Outlaw Masters of Japanese Film, author Chris Desjardins calls the Bodyguard Kiba films "enjoyable but forgettable timewasters." In an interview with Sonny Chiba, Desjardins opines, "The four Yakuza Cop movies and the two Bodyguard Kiba films, it seemed Toei was attempting to groom you into even more of an action star, a character thrown into dangerous situations but often with humor added to the mix." Chiba responds, "Your impression of Toei trying to turn me into a fast-paced action hero is correct." Chiba goes on to explain, "The Bodyguard Kiba movies and before didn't have any Bruce Lee influence."

The website Sketches of Chiba states, "Bodyguard Kiba 2 comes to its conclusion in an entertaining, though not classic, violent climax. If the rest of the film had been as good as the opening and closing fights, this would be a small gem. As it stands, Bodyguard Kiba 2 is more relevant for uniting Chiba, Shihomi and Ishibashi for the first time on screen."

Reviewing the home release of the original Japanese versions of Bodyguard Kiba and Bodyguard Kiba 2, reviewer Ben Jones of thegeekshow.co.uk wrote, "Sonny Chiba shines through every scene, oozing cool and menace everywhere he goes. The guys want to be him and the ladies want to be with him, and who can blame them, because he has it all. And that's the thing with these movies, they aren't great art, but they don't have to be, because when you have such a characteristic lead, everything else becomes secondary."
