= Rikiya Yasuoka =

Japanese actor and singer

- Born: July 19, 1947; Minato-ku, Tokyo, Japan
- Died: April 8, 2012 (aged 64)
- Occupation: Actor
- Years active: 1964–2004

Rikiya Yasuoka (安岡力也, Yasuoka Rikiya; 19 July 1947 – 8 April 2012) was a Japanese actor and singer of mixed Italian and Japanese descent.

== Biography ==
Born in Tokyo, he appeared in his first film, Jitensha dorobo, in 1964.

He was diagnosed with Guillain–Barré syndrome in late June 2006 and died of heart failure on 8 April 2012.

== Filmography ==
Year	Title	Role	Notes
1964	Jidōsha dorobō		
1970	Stray Cat Rock: Sex Hunter	Kazuma	
1970	Jack no irezumi		
1970	Furyo bancho kuchi kara demakase		
1971	Nora-neko rokku: Bōsō shūdan '71	Hesu	
1971	Furyo bancho te haccho kuchi haccho		
1972	Ōkami yakuza: Tomurai ha ore ga dasu		
1972	Yakuza to kōsō: Jitsuroku Andō-gumi		
1972	Furyo bancho ichimou dajin		
1973	Jitsuroku Andō-gumi: Shūgeki-hen		
1973	Hijo gakuen waru: kyoshi gari		
1973	Hijō gakuen: warū		
1973	Bodyguard Kiba	Dubhe	
1973	Bodyguard Kiba 2	Kanbe	
1974	Bōryoku gai		
1974	Chokugeki! Jigoku-ken	Lone wolf	
1974	Onna hissatsu ken: Kiki ippatsu	Genjuro Ranai	
1974	Chokugeki jigoku-ken: Dai-gyakuten	One eyed Sammy	
1974	Hijo gakuen waru - nerikan dokisei		
1974	Gokudo VS furyō banchō		
1975	Urufu gai: Moero ōkami-otoko	Hanamura	
1975	Karei-naru tsuiseki	Shudô	
1975	Torakku Yarō: Go-iken muyō		
1975	Shōrinji kenpō	Takehara	
1978	Eroticna kankei	Staff in Sports club	
1979	Sūpā gun redei Wani Bunsho	Nakamoto	
1980	Yajū shisubeshi	Minehara	
1981	Yokohama BJ būrusu		
1981	A! Onnatachi: Waika	Yutaka	
1981	Sekushī purin: Kuse ni narisō	Shibuta	
1982	Mizu no nai puuru	Yakuza's follower	
1982	Roaring Fire	Shiro	
1982	Zokubutsu zukan	Keiichi saijo	
1982	Saraba aibō	Yasuda	
1983	Orecchi no Wedding	Bartender	
1983	The Mosquito on the Tenth Floor	Yazawa	
1984	Sukurappu: aru ai no monogatari	Customer	
1985	Himatsuri	Toshio	
1985	Tampopo	Pisken	
1986	Comic Magazine	Man at bar	
1986	O-nyanko za mūbī Kiki ippatu!	King of Clover	
1986	Jittemai		
1986	Sailor Fuku Hangyaku Doumei	Saeki Kazuya	
1987	Shinjuku Jun'ai Monogatari	Suzumura	
1987	Gokudo no onna-tachi 2	Makimura	
1987	Hei no naka no purei bōru	Fukada	
1987	Saraba itoshiki hito yo	Gozo Kiuchi	
1988	Tokyo Pop	Akira (Manager)	
1989	Zatoichi: The Blind Swordsman	Yōjinbō / Bodyguard	
1989	The Toxic Avenger Part II	Big Mac Bunko	
1989	Black Rain	Sugai's man #2	
1990	Jigoru koppu: roppongi Akasaka bishoinen kurabu		
1992	Itsuka giragirasuruhi		
1994	Shin gokudo no onna-tachi: horetara jigoku		
1996	Otokotachi no kaita e	Teacher of Beauty parlor	
1997	Kikansha sensei		Voice
2000	Inochi no umi	Shigemune	
2001	Family		
2002	Shin Jingi no Hakaba	Aoyama	
2002	Gokudô seisen: Jihaado II		
2002	Gokudô seisen: Jihaado III		
2002	Jitsuroku Andô Noboru kyôdô-den: Rekka		
2004	Izo		
