= Dragon Princess =

- Theatrical poster
- Directed by: Yutaka Kohira
- Written by: Hiroo Matsuda
- Produced by: Kineo Yoshimine
- Starring: Etsuko Shihomi; Sonny Chiba
- Cinematography: Hanjiro Nakazawa
- Edited by: Osamu Tanaka
- Music by: Shunsuke Kikuchi
- Distributed by: Toei
- Release date: January 31, 1976
- Running time: 81 minutes
- Country: Japan
- Language: Japanese

Dragon Princess (Japanese: 必殺女拳士) is a 1975 karate film directed by Yutaka Kohira.

== Plot ==
The film opens with Isshin Higaki and his daughter Yumi Higaki being attacked by a rival karate master, Hironobu Nikaido who wants Isshin's job as top karate master. Nikaido teams up with four other masters and they manage to disable one of Isshin's arms and wound his eye with a kunai knife. Alive but crippled Isshin and Yumi retreat to New York where he trains his daughter to avenge him and the death of a friend. After her father's death, Yumi returns to Tokyo to take her revenge. She enters a karate tournament funded by a corrupt business man, but Nikaido, seeking to assure his student's supremacy in the coming fight, sends his four top fighters to wipe out the rest of the competition. Eventually, Yumi, with the help of another karate student, Masahiko Okizaki kills Nikaido and his minions. Her arm is permanently disabled, keeping her from continuing her karate but allowing her to continue on with the rest of her life.

== Cast ==
- Etsuko Shihomi as Yumi Higaki
- Sonny Chiba as Isshin Higaki
- Yasuaki Kurata as Masahiko Okizaki
- Jirō Chiba as Jiro Chinen
- Bin Amatsu as Hironobu Nikaido
- Masashi Ishibashi as Shiroge Oni
- Tatsuya Kameyama as Baba
- Shunsuke Kariya as Yokoi
- Yoshi Katō as Kakuzen

== Home media ==
On November 20, 2007, BCI Eclipse released the film in their Sonny Chiba Collection DVD set, which also includes Golgo 13: Assignment Kowloon, The Bullet Train, Karate Kiba, Karate Warriors, and Sister Street Fighter.
