= Tokugawa Tadanaga =

Japanese daimyō of the early Edo period (1606–1634)

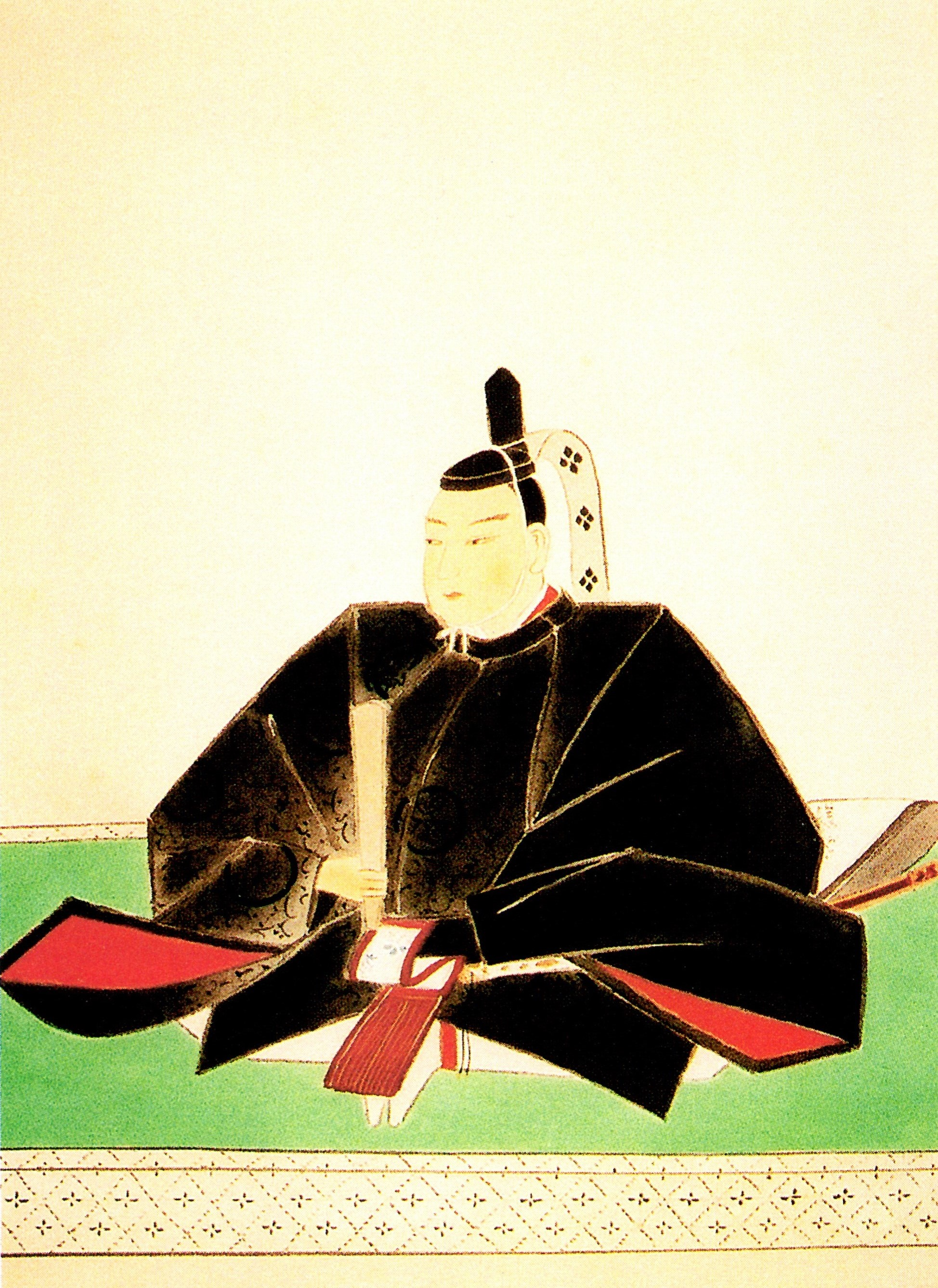
Painting of Tokugawa Tadanaga

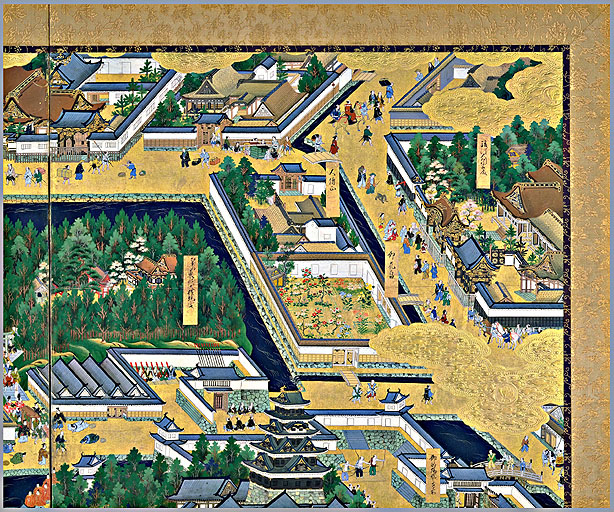
The Suruga Dainagon Residence close to the Honmaru of Edo Castle, on the upper right side of the "View of Edo" folding screens (17th century)

Tokugawa Tadanaga (徳川 忠長; 1606 – January 5, 1634) was a Japanese daimyō of the early Edo period. The son of the second shōgun Tokugawa Hidetada, his elder brother was the third shōgun Tokugawa Iemitsu.

== Biography ==
Often called Suruga Dainagon (the major counsellor of Suruga), Tadanaga was born in 1606. His birth name was Kunichiyo (国千代). The date of his birth is uncertain, and is variously given as May 7, June 1, and December 3. Blessed with military and intellectual prowess and a generosity of spirit, he received support from his mother, Oeyo (or Sūgen'in), who favored him over her other son Takechiyo (the future Iemitsu) to become the third shogun. Just after the death of their father shogun Hidetada, Iemitsu accused his brother, already under house arrest in Kōfu, of insanity, stripped him of all possessions and offices, leaving him to commit seppuku.

It is also said that Tadanaga's face was similar to that of his cousin Toyotomi Hideyori and for that reason Ieyasu hated and feared Tadanaga.

He married Masako (1614–90) later Shōkō-in, the daughter of Oda Nobuyoshi (1584–1626), who was the grandson of Oda Nobunaga through Oda Nobukatsu.

The Suruga Dainagon Residence was close to Honmaru enceinte of Edo Castle to the northwest, and is depicted on the upper right side of the "View of Edo" folding screens from the 17th century.

=== Crime/Legend ===
According to "Tokugawa jikki," he is said to have killed more than 1,240 monkeys, which were worshiped as divine beasts, in Mount Shizuhata. It is said that he stabbed his vassal Shichinosuke Ohama to death, on the way back from monkey hunting, he stabbed a kagokaki to death with a sword, committed many other murders, killed and injured dozens of vassals, and forced a handmaiden to drink a large amount of alcohol, leading to her death. He is also said to have committed other acts, such as killing a girl, dismembering her, and feeding them to dogs, and cutting open the abdomen of a pregnant woman and pulling out her fetus, but these are not recorded in records of the time and are known as legends. He is also said to have committed unusual acts such as ordering the perpetrators of the murders to be summoned the day after he murdered the Shichinosuke Ohama and monks. Susumu Koike, a part-time lecturer at Toyo University, claims that these crimes were caused by hallucinations and delusions caused by schizophrenia.

== In popular culture ==
- Basilisk (manga)
- Choshichiro Edo Nikki
- Haru no Sakamichi (TV series)
- Kengatoki
- Shigurui
- Shogun's Samurai
- Ōoku (1983 TV series)
- The Unfettered Shogun

== Events ==
- 1606: Born to Hidetada and Sūgen'in
- 1624: Appointed daimyō of Suruga, Tōtōmi, and Kai Provinces, with a rating of 550,000 koku in the Kōfu Domain
- 1626: Kills a retainer and commits other acts of violence
- 1631: Placed under house arrest in Kōfu
- 1632: Stripped of office
- 1634: Commits seppuku under arrest in Takasaki

== See also ==
- Tokugawa Ieyasu
- Tokugawa Hidetada
- Suruga Province
