= The Battle of Port Arthur =

- Film poster
- Directed by: Toshio Masuda
- Screenplay by: Kazuo Kasahara
- Produced by: Shigeru Okada
- Starring: Tatsuya Nakadai; Tetsuro Tamba; Teruhiko Aoi; Masako Natsume; Kenji Niinuma; Masayuki Yuhara; Makoto Satō; Toshiyuki Nagashima; Akio Hasegawa; Shigeru Amachi; Yōko Nogiwa; Kinya Aikawa; Hisaya Morishige; Toshirō Mifune
- Narrated by: Taketoshi Naitō
- Cinematography: Masahiko Iimura
- Edited by: Kiyoaki Saitō
- Music by: Naozumi Yamamoto
- Production company: Toei Company
- Distributed by: Toei Company
- Release date: August 2, 1980 (Japan)
- Running time: 185 minutes
- Country: Japan
- Language: Japanese

The Battle of Port Arthur (Japanese: 二百三高地, Hepburn: Ni hyaku san kochi) is a 1980 Japanese war film directed by Toshio Masuda. The Japanese title Ni hyaku san kochi means Hill 203. The film depicts the fiercest battles at Hill 203 in the Siege of Port Arthur during the Russo-Japanese War (1904–1905).

== Cast ==
- Tatsuya Nakadai as General Baron Nogi Maresuke
- Tetsuro Tamba as General Baron Kodama Gentarō
- Teruhiko Aoi as Koga Takeshi
- Kenji Niinuma as Kinoshita
- Toshiyuki Nagashima as Nogi Yasusuke
- Makoto Satō as Ushiwaka Toratarō
- Isao Tamagawa as Matsumura Kanetomo
- Hiroshi Nawa as Lieutenant General Nakamura Satoru
- Yoko Nogiwa as Nogi Shizuko
- Masako Natsume as Matsuo Sachi
- Shigeru Kōyama as Marshal Marquess Yamagata Aritomo
- Shigeru Amachi as Baron Kaneko Kentarō
- Nobuo Kawai as Baron Komura Jutarō
- Yoshio Inaba as Major General Ijichi Kōsuke
- Jirō Yabuki as Kuji
- Kastutoshi Arata as Ainoda
- Kunio Murai as Oki Teisuke
- Akihiko Hirata as Major General Nagaoka Gaishi
- Go Wakabayashi as Kamiizumi Tokuya
- Kayo Matsuo as Empress Shōken
- Hisaya Morishige as Marquess Itō Hirobumi, President of the Privy Council of Japan
- Toshirō Mifune as Emperor Meiji

== Staff ==
- Planning: Kiyoshi Koda, Kanji Amao, Hiroko Ota, Tsuneo Seto
- Screenplay: Kazuo Kasahara
- Photography: Masahiko Iimura
- Special Effects Director: Akinori Nakano
- Sound Recordist: Hiroyoshi Sokata
- Lighting: Shigeru Umeya
- Production Designer: Hiroshi Kitagawa
- Chief Assistant Director: Akinori Baba
- Editor: Kiyoaki Saito
- Sound Effects: Ryuzo Iwafuji
- Record: Shigeko Katsuhara
- Mito: Shinosuke Ogata
- Device: Shigeharu Yasawa
- Decoration: Yasuji Igarashi
- Special Effects: Ohira SFX
- Acting office: Mitsuo Yamada
- Cosmetics: Mamoru Inoue, Kinue Suetake
- Beauty: Takako Miyajima
- Costume: Fukusaki Seigo
- Tattoo: Ryoji Kasumi
- Advertiser: Shun Sakamoto, Hachio Yamamoto
- Stills Photography: Mitsuo Kato
- Russian Language Instructor: Mariko Nabeya
- Dialect guidance: Kazuya Takeo, Kenji Isomura

=== SFX Unit ===
Photography: Takao Tsurumi Lighting: Masakuni Morimoto Art Director: Yasuyuki Inoue Optical Photography: Takeshi Miyanishi Animation Produced by: Toei Animation Film Processing: Toei Labotech Chief of Operations: Michio Ishikawa

=== Music Recording Staff ===
Directed and Conducted by: Naozumi Yamamoto Music: Akihiko Takashima Performed by: New Japan Philharmonic Orchestra Produced by: Free Flight Records, Oz Music Released Thru: Warner Pioneer

=== Special Thanks ===
Narrator: Taketoshi Naito

Planning Cooperation

- Ryuzo Sejima, Shiro Hara, Masataka Chihaya

Costume production

- Tokyo costume Cooperation
- Oshima Onsen Hotel
- Fujita Tourism Oshima Kowakien
- Oshima Town Hall
- Oshima Branch of Tokyo
- Mitsui Kinzoku Kogyo Co., Ltd.
- Book Publishing Edition
- Photo Book Russo-Japanese War
- Chuo Nogikai
- Nogi Shrine
- Group Himawari
- Toei Actor Center

Produced in Association with

- Toho Eizo Art

== Honors ==
=== 4th Japan Academy Film Prize ===
- Won: Best Actor in a Supporting Role - Tetsuro Tamba
- Nominated: Best Director - Toshio Masuda

=== 23rd Blue Ribbon Awards ===
- Won: 1981: Blue Ribbon Awards: Best Actor - Tatsuya Nakadai
- Won: 1981: Blue Ribbon Awards: Best Supporting Actor - Tetsuro Tamba
