= Message from Space =

1978 space opera film by Kinji Fukasaku

- Theatrical release poster

Japanese name
- Kanji: 宇宙からのメッセージ
Transcriptions
- Revised Hepburn: Uchū kara no Messēji
- Directed by: Kinji Fukasaku
- Screenplay by: Hiro Matusda
- Story by: Kinji Fukasaku; Shotaro Ishinomori; Masahiro Noda
- Based on: Nansō Satomi Hakkenden by Kyokutei Bakin
- Produced by: Banjiro Uemura; Yoshinori Watanabe; Tan Takaiwa
- Starring: Vic Morrow; Sonny Chiba; Philip Casnoff; Peggy Lee Brennan; Etsuko Shihomi; Mikio Narita; Makoto Satō; Hiroyuki Sanada
- Cinematography: Toru Nakajima
- Edited by: Isamu Ichida
- Music by: Kenichiro Morioka
- Production companies: Toei Company; Tohokushinsha Film
- Distributed by: Toei Company (Japan)
- Release date: April 29, 1978 (Japan)
- Running time: 105 minutes
- Country: Japan
- Language: Japanese

Message from Space (Japanese: 宇宙からのメッセージ, Hepburn: Uchū Kara no Messēji) is a 1978 Japanese space opera film directed and co-written by Kinji Fukasaku for Toei Company. It stars Sonny Chiba, Etsuko Shihomi, Vic Morrow, Philip Casnoff, Mikio Narita, Makoto Satō, and Hiroyuki Sanada. It is a science-fiction adaptation of the 19th-century yomihon Nansō Satomi Hakkenden by Kyokutei Bakin.

Produced at a cost between the equivalent of US$5 and 6 million, it was the most expensive film made in Japan at the time. Upon release in the United States, Message from Space received generally negative reviews from critics who not only found many similarities with the previous year's Star Wars (1977), but also felt the special effects were poorly executed in comparison to the American film. It was however nominated for Best Foreign Film at the 7th Saturn Awards in 1980.

== Plot ==
The planet Jillucia, located in the Andromeda galaxy, is conquered by the steel-skinned Gavanas Empire, who transform it into a military fortress. Kido, the leader of the Jillucians, sends eight Liabe Seeds to find help. Princess Emeralida and the warrior Urocco flee Jillucia in a space galleon as the Gavanas, led by Emperor Rockseia XXII, pursue them.

The Liabe Seeds reach various individuals, including Shiro and Aaron, two reckless space pilots; Jack, a friend entangled in debts to gangsters; Meia, a young aristocrat; and General Garuda, a disillusioned officer. These characters encounter the Jillucians and learn of the seeds' divine selection of warriors to liberate Jillucia. Initial reluctance and betrayal occur, including Jack selling out Urocco and Emeralida, though Jack later regrets his actions. Urocco survives an assassination attempt, and Gavanas troops capture Emeralida.

The group eventually unites when Garuda, persuaded by a glowing Liabe seed, joins the cause. They discover Prince Hans, the rightful heir to the Gavanas throne, who reveals Rockseia's betrayal of his family. Meanwhile, Rockseia forces the Jillucians to watch as he propels Jillucia toward Earth as part of his conquest plans. The Earth government seeks a peaceful resolution, but Rockseia rejects their envoy, General Garuda, and destroys Earth's moon as a warning.

The Liabe warriors infiltrate the Gavanas base, intending to destroy the reactor that powers the empire's fortress. Urocco, initially disillusioned, sacrifices himself in battle, becoming the eighth Liabe warrior as he dies. Prince Hans leads the Jillucians in revolt, ultimately killing Rockseia in combat. Shiro and Aaron destroy the reactor, escaping just as Jillucia is destroyed in the explosion.

As the planet disintegrates, the surviving Jillucians escape on a space galleon, joined by Garuda, Beba-2, and the remaining Liabe warriors. Shiro, Aaron, and Meia carry out a suicidal attack on the Gavanas space carrier, causing it to crash. They awaken on the space galleon, miraculously saved by the power of the Liabe seeds. Offered asylum on Earth, the Jillucians decline and set off in search of a new home.

== Cast ==
- Vic Morrow as General Garuda
- Sonny Chiba as Hans
- Philip Casnoff as Aaron
- Peggy Lee Brennan as Meia
- Etsuko Shihomi as Emeralida
- Tetsurō Tamba as Noguchi
- Mikio Narita as Rockseia XII
- Makoto Satō as Urocco
- Hiroyuki Sanada as Shiro
- Isamu Shimizu as Robot Beba-2
  - Machiko Soga as Beba-2 (voice)
- Masazumi Okabe as Jack
- Noboru Mitani as Kamesasa
- Hideyo Amamoto as Dark
- Junkichi Orimoto as Kido
- Harumi Sone as Lazarl
- Jerry Ito as Commander

== Production ==
Message from Space cost between US$5 and 6 million, roughly half the budget of Star Wars (1977), which made it the most expensive Japanese film, until it was beaten by Fukasaku's later film Virus (1980).

== Release ==
United Artists theatrical poster for the 1978 U.S. release of Message from Space.

Message from Space was released in Japan on April 29, 1978. The American version of the film was released in the United States on October 30, 1978, where it was distributed by United Artists. United Artists acquired Message from Space at a US$1 million cost; according to company personnel: "[It] can't keep 'em from lining up at the box office. It's a Jap Star Wars! It'll clean up." Studio executive Steven Bach, however, countered: "The only thing it cleaned up was the red inkwell."

Shout! Factory released Message from Space on DVD on April 16, 2013.

== Reception ==
Message from Space was nominated for Best Foreign Film at the 7th Saturn Awards in 1980. However, it received generally negative reviews from Western critics. Janet Maslin of The New York Times described the film as "so terrible it has a certain comic integrity". The review noted poor special effects based on miniatures and that the screenplay was "pleasantly indecipherable, and the screenplay seems to have passed through a food processor with a sense of humor." Kevin Thomas wrote in the Los Angeles Times that the predominantly adult audience when he viewed the film "laughed it off the screen" and that "small children will probably be entertained by it – if they can figure out what's going on." The Boston Globe opined that the "fallout from Star Wars space garbage continues to litter [the] motion picture screen". The review found the special effects and plot to be poor and that the robots and villains were not as funny or interesting as R2-D2 or Darth Vader respectively. The Washington Star compared the film to the television series Battlestar Galactica (1978) stating that it would make "an American hold his head up high with pride" in comparison. The Washington Post referred to the cast as "weirdly unappealing" and that the costumes, make-up and décor are "often dazzlingly grotesque and bewildering." The review concluded that the "only element of the production that might be considered respectable is the modelling of some of the spaceships and their subsequent demolition in battle." Variety gave the film a positive review, noting that the film "borrows wholesale from [Star Wars]", while stating "if the Japanese have not come up with something original, they have brought forth an illegitimate baby that is so good that it will not shame its unacknowledged parents. The special effects are spectacular and the action is everything one could wish."

From retrospective reviews, online film database AllMovie gave the film three stars out of five, described reviews as "unfairly slagged as a cheap rip-off of Star Wars" and that the film "makes up for its shortcomings with a devil-may-care energy reminiscent of '40s-era serials". The review recommended the film to "non-discerning genre fans" and children. In his book Japanese Science Fiction, Fantasy and Horror Films, Stuart Galbraith IV noted that "What separates a film like Star Wars from Message from Space is the former's timelessness", finding elements such as the costumes, makeup and "incidental disco-style score" were "very dated, even embarrassing".

== TV series ==
The film spawned a 27-episode spin-off TV series titled Message from Space: Galactic Wars (宇宙からのメッセージ 銀河大戦, Uchū kara no Messēji: Ginga Taisen), which aired on TV Asahi from July 8, 1978 to January 27, 1979.

== Notes ==
=== References ===
- Galbraith IV, Stuart (1994). Japanese Science Fiction, Fantasy and Horror Films. McFarland. ISBN 0-89950-853-7.
- Hardy, Phil, ed. (1984). Science Fiction. New York : Morrow. ISBN 0-688-00842-9.
- Willis, Donald, ed. (1985). Variety's Complete Science Fiction Reviews. Garland Publishing Inc. ISBN 978-0-8240-6263-7.
