= Golgo 13: Assignment Kowloon =

- Theatrical release poster
- Directed by: Yukio Noda
- Written by: Takeshi Matsumoto; Nobuaki Nakajima
- Based on: Golgo 13 by Takao Saito
- Produced by: Callan Leung
- Starring: Sonny Chiba
- Cinematography: Shigeru Akatsuka
- Edited by: Akira Suzuki
- Music by: Harumi Ibe
- Distributed by: Toei (Japan); Chia Lun Motion Picture Co. (Hong Kong)
- Release dates: 15 September 1977 (Japan); 4 May 1978 (Hong Kong)
- Running time: 93 minutes
- Countries: Japan; Hong Kong
- Language: Japanese

Golgo 13: Assignment Kowloon (Japanese: ゴルゴ13 九竜の首, Hepburn: Gorugo Sātīn Kûron no kubi) is a 1977 Japanese-language action thriller film starring Sonny Chiba as the international hitman Golgo 13. It is the second live-action movie based on the manga series Golgo 13, after the eponymous 1973 Japanese–Iranian film starring Ken Takakura.

== Plot ==
Professional hitman Golgo 13 aka Duke Togo is hired by an American crime syndicate to kill Chou Lei Fang, a powerful member of the syndicate's Hong Kong branch who has been selling their drugs through his own channels. At the same time, he has to keep an eye out on Smith, a hard-boiled Hong Kong detective who is hell-bent on taking down Chou and his drug-manufacturing organization.

One night, an undercover officer named Lin Li follows Chou and infiltrates his drug factory, but she is shot and captured by his henchmen. The next day, Smith locates Chou's factory after a group of children find Lin Li's communicator, but Lin Li is killed during a shootout and the factory is destroyed. By this time, both Chou and Smith have been made aware that Golgo 13 is in Hong Kong. Smith has a personal vendetta on Golgo 13, who assassinated a foreign diplomat he was assigned to protect a year earlier. Because of this, Smith urges the police chief to issue a warrant to arrest Chou before Golgo 13 gets to him first. The next day, during a ceremony to open a public swimming pool funded by Chou, Golgo 13 prepares to shoot the drug lord from a nearby building, but a female Caucasian hitwoman named Leika gets to Chou first. While Smith and his men presume it was Golgo 13 that killed Chou, Golgo 13 suspects someone in Hong Kong higher than Chou ordered the hit. The American syndicate offers Golgo 13 an extra $100,000 to track down the mastermind. Shortly after Chou's funeral, his widow Li Hua and Leika are killed by Golgo 13 while attempting to put him down.

Golgo 13 travels to Japan to follow Poranian diplomat Polansky, who had strong ties with Chou. There, he discovers that Polansky is seeking U.S. asylum from the FBI in exchange for vital information related to Chou's drug trafficking network. At the same time, Smith follows the trail and manages to arrest Golgo 13 when the hitman returns to Hong Kong. Smith attempts to interrogate Golgo 13, but to no avail, as the hitman is released after police discover that it was Leika who assassinated Chou. On his way to the U.S. Embassy, Golgo 13 encounters and kills a hitman named Schilz during an ambush, despite being shot in the leg. Meanwhile, Smith and his team discover that Polansky has been receiving drug shipments from all over Southeast Asia, but the police cannot touch him due to diplomatic immunity. Golgo 13 recovers from his wound and heads for Sekirei Island, where Polansky is hiding. Despite having no jurisdiction, Smith and his men raid the Island. Polansky attempts to escape via helicopter, but Golgo 13 - who is hanging by the side of a cliff, guns him down, sending him out of the helicopter and crashing into the ocean. His body and the briefcase containing evidence of his involvement with Chou's assassination are recovered by Smith's team.

The next day, Golgo 13 and Smith meet again at Kai Tak Airport. Smith punches Golgo 13, vowing to lock him up should he ever return to Hong Kong.

== Cast ==
- Sonny Chiba as Golgo 13
- Callan Leung as Dirk Chang Smith
- Etsuko Shihomi as Lin Li
- Jerry Ito as Polansky
- Alan Chui as Poison Spider Black Dragon (cameo)
- Clayton as Rocky Brown
- Yao Lin Chen as Chan
- Emi Shindo as Yip Lin
- Elaine Sung as Kong Laan
- Dana as Leika
- Kōji Tsuruta as Senzō Shigemune

== Home media ==
Golgo 13: Assignment Kowloon was bundled with The Bullet Train and Executioner in the Kill Chiba Collection Region 1 DVD set by Crash Cinema on May 18, 2004. On November 20, 2007, BCI Eclipse released the film in their Sonny Chiba Collection DVD set, which also includes The Bullet Train, Dragon Princess, The Bodyguard, Karate Warriors, and Sister Street Fighter.

In the UK, the film was bundled with The Bullet Train and G.I. Samurai in The Sonny Chiba Collection Vol. 2 Region 2 DVD set by Optimum Home Releasing.

On November 14, 2023, Shout! Studios released the original Japanese edit of the film in their Sonny Chiba Collection: Volume 2 Blu-ray set, which also includes The Defensive Power of Aikido, 13 Steps of Maki, The Great Okinawa Yakuza War, Karate for Life, Karate Warriors, and The Okinawa War of Ten Years. An audio commentary track was recorded by martial arts film historian Brian Bankston of the Cool Ass Cinema blog.
