= Executioner (1974 film) =

- Film poster
- Directed by: Teruo Ishii
- Written by: Teruo Ishii
- Produced by: Hisashi Yabe; Sunao Sakagami
- Starring: Sonny Chiba; Makoto Satō; Yutaka Nakajima; Eiji Gō; Hiroyuki Sanada
- Cinematography: Yoshikazu Yamasawa
- Edited by: Fumio Soda
- Music by: Hajime Kaburagi
- Distributed by: Toei Company
- Release date: August 10, 1974 (Japan)
- Running time: 87 minutes
- Country: Japan
- Language: Japanese

Executioner (Japanese: 直撃! 地獄拳, Hepburn: Chokugeki! Jigokuken) is a 1974 Japanese martial arts film starring Sonny Chiba.

== Cast ==
- Sonny Chiba - Ryuichi Koga
- Makoto Satō - Takeshi Hayato
- Yutaka Nakajima - Emi
- Eiji Gō - Ichiro Sakura
- Hiroyuki Sanada - Ryuichi Koga as a boy
- Ryō Ikebe as Arashiyama

== Home media ==
Executioner was bundled with The Bullet Train and Golgo 13: Assignment Kowloon in the Kill Chiba Collection Region 1 DVD set by Crash Cinema on May 18, 2004.
