= Robot Detective =

- Genre: Tokusatsu; Detective fiction Superhero fiction Action-adventure
- Created by: Shotaro Ishinomori
- Developed by: Masaru Igami
- Directed by: Atsuo Okunaka
- Starring: Takashi Nakajima (stunt actor); Kaku Takashina; Jiro Yabuki; Keiko Kurenai; Yumiko Kaga
- Voices of: Shūsei Nakamura
- Narrated by: Keiichi Noda
- Theme music composer: Shunsuke Kikuchi (all songs); Hosoku Yattemirō (opening and insert song)
- Opening theme: "Robot Detective" by Ichiro Mizuki
- Ending theme: "Proceed! Robot Detective" by Ichiro Mizuki
- Composer: Shunsuke Kikuchi
- Country of origin: Japan
- Original language: Japanese
- No. of series: 1
- No. of episodes: 26

Production
- Production location: Tokyo
- Running time: 30 minutes
- Production company: Toei Company Ltd.

Original release
- Network: Fuji Television
- Release: April 5 – September 27, 1973

Robot Detective (ロボット刑事, Robotto Keiji) is a tokusatsu superhero TV series. Created by Shotaro Ishinomori, the series was produced by Toei Company Ltd., and broadcast on Fuji TV from April 5 to September 27, 1973, with a total of 26 episodes. It stars Jirō Chiba.

The hero of this series is a robot named "Robot Detective K" (or just "K"), who has no human form, but when not in battle, dresses up in human clothes and has a human-like personality. The main antagonist is BAD (バドー, Badō; pronounced Bah-doh).

Along with Android Kikaider Robot Detective was one of the early predecessors to what would become the Metal Hero Series of programs featuring human-sized cyborg heroes.

== Episode list ==
1. The Murderous Salesman of BAD (バドーの殺人セールスマン, Badō no Satsujin Sērusuman)
2. The Eye-Witness is a Zero (目撃者はゼロ, Mokugekisha wa Zero)
3. The Insanity Watch Scandal (時計発狂事件, Tokei Hakkyō Jiken)
4. The Murderer Disappears in the Wall (壁に消えた殺人者, Kabe ni Kieta Satsujinsha)
5. The Mystery of the Double Criminal (二重犯人の謎, Nijū Hannin no Nazo)
6. The Terrifying Execution Machine!! (恐怖の死刑マシン!!, Kyōfu no Shikei Mashin!!)
7. A Terror Above!! (頭上の恐怖!!, Zujō no Kyōfu!!)
8. The Thunder Kills?! (雷が殺した?!, Kaminari ga Koroshita?!)
9. The Electric Chair Spy!! (電気椅子スパイ!!, Denkīsu Supai!!)
10. BAD's Massacre Strategy!! (バドーのみな殺し作戦!!, Badō no Minagoroshi Sakusen!!)
11. The Secret of BAD Base!! (バドー基地の秘密!!, Badō Kichi no Himitsu!!)
12. Aiming for the Mother! (マザーが狙われる!, Mazā ga Nerawareru!)
13. Watch out for the Devilish Smoke! (悪魔の煙に気をつけろ!, Akuma no En ni Ki o Tsukero!)
14. Lighting Eyes of Terror!! (光る眼の恐怖!!, Hikaru Manako no Kyōfu!!)
15. Target is Atom Number 79?! (標的は原子番号79?!, Hyōteki wa Genji Bangō Nanajū-Kyū?!)
16. Snatch Away from BAD!! (バドーから奪え!!, Badō kara Ubae!!)
17. The Demonic Suds in a Disappearance?! (魔の泡に消されるな?!, Ma no Awa ni Kesareru na?!)
18. BAD's Frozen Strategy!! (バドーの冷凍作戦!!, Badō no Reitō Sakusen!!)
19. Pursuiting the Mystery in the Seas of Okinawa!! (沖縄の海に謎を追え!!, Okinawa no Umi ni Nazo o Oe!!)
20. The Hydrogen Bomb Blimp Heads to Tokyo! (水爆飛行船 東京へ!, Suibaku Hikōsen Tōkyō e!)
21. The Terrifying Electrothermal Man: Mother Blows Up and Sinks!! (恐怖デンネツマン マザー爆沈!!, Kyōfu Dennetsuman Mazā Bakuchin!!)
22. The Terrifying Missile Man: BAD's True Colors!! (恐悪ミサイルマン バドーの正体!!, Kyōfu Misairu Man Badō no Shōtai!!)
23. Diving Man: Underwater of Terror (センスイマン 水中の恐怖!!, Sensuiman Suichū no Kyōfu)
24. Depth Charge Man: Scorching Strategy!! (バクライマン 焦熱作戦!!, Bakurai Man Shōnetsu Sakusen!!)
25. The Atrocious Gatling Man's BAD Virus Strategy!! (兇悪ガトリングマンのバドービールス作戦!!, Kyōaku Gatoringu Man no Badō Bīrusu Sakusen!!)
26. BAD Dies in Mars!! (バドー火星に死す!!, Badō Kasei ni Shisu!!)

== Cast ==
- Robot Detective (K) (ロボット刑事(K), Robotto Keiji (Kei); Voice): Shūsei Nakamura (仲村 秀生, Nakamura Shūsei)
  - Suit Actor: Takashi Nakajima (中島 律, Nakajima Takashi), Osamu Kaneda (金田 治, Kaneda Osamu)
  - Suit Actor (battle scenes): Osamu Kaneda (金田 治, Kaneda Osamu), Junji Yamaoka (山岡 淳二, Yamaoka Junji)
- Tsuyoshi Shinjō (新條 強, Shinjō Tsuyoshi): Jirō Yabuki (矢吹 二朗, Yabuki Jirō) (played as Jirō Chiba (千葉 治郎, Chiba Jirō))
- Daizō Shiba (芝 大造, Shiba Daizō): Kaku Takashina (高品 格, Takashina Kaku)
- Nami Shiba (芝 奈美, Shiba Nami): Keiko Kurenai (紅 景子, Kurenai Keiko)
- Yumi Shiba (芝 由美, Shiba Yumi): Yumiko Kaga (加賀 由美子, Kaga Yumiko)
- Jihei Jigoku (地獄 耳平, Jigoku Jihei): Sakyō Mikami (三上 左京, Mikami Sakyō)
- Saori Kirishima (霧島 サオリ, Kirishima Saori): Yūko Kimi (君 夕子, Kimi Yūko)
- BAD (バドー, Badō; Voice): Kiyoshi Kawakubo (川久保 潔, Kawakubo Kiyoshi)
- George Kirishima (霧島 ジョージ, Kirishima Jōji): Sumio Tomikawa (富川 澈夫, Tomikawa Sumio)
- Keitarō Shinjō (新條 敬太郎, Shinjō Keitarō): Sonny Chiba (played as Shin'ichi Chiba (千葉 真一, Chiba Shin'ichi))
- BAD Robot (バドーロボット, Badō Robotto; Suit Actor): Junji Yamaoka (山岡 淳二, Yamaoka Junji), Jyunichi Haruta (春田 純一, Haruta Jun'ichi)
- Narrator (ナレーター, Narētā): Keiichi Noda (野田 圭一, Noda Keiichi)

== Songs ==
Opening Theme:

1. "Robot Detective" (ロボット刑事, Robotto Keiji)

Ending Theme:

1. "Proceed! Robot Detective" (進め! ロボット刑事, Susume! Robotto Keiji)

Insert Song:

1. "K Was Born" (ケイは生まれた, Kei wa Umareta)
2. "Robot Detective Has Arrived" (やって来たロボット刑事, Yattekita Robotto Keiji)

Composed by:	Shunsuke Kikuchi (all songs), Hosoku Yattemirō (opening and insert song)
Lyrics by:	Saburo Yatsude (opening song), Shotaro Ishinomori (ending theme and insert song)
Performed by:	Ichiro Mizuki

== Other appearances ==
- A character resembling K appears in Shin Kamen Rider and its manga spin-off There is no true peace in this world -Shin Kamen Rider SHOCKER SIDE-, voiced by Tori Matsuzaka. This version of the character is depicted as an AI working for SHOCKER.
