= Shogun's Samurai =

1978 film by Kinji Fukasaku

- Theatrical release poster
- Directed by: Kinji Fukasaku
- Written by: Kinji Fukasaku; Tatsuo Nogami; Hirō Matsuda
- Starring: Kinnosuke Yorozuya; Shinichi Chiba; Hiroki Matsukata
- Cinematography: Norimichi Ikawa
- Music by: Toshiaki Tsushima
- Production company: Toei Company
- Distributed by: Toei Company
- Release date: January 21, 1978
- Running time: 130 minutes
- Country: Japan
- Language: Japanese

Shogun's Samurai, known in Japan as The Yagyu Clan Conspiracy (Japanese: 柳生一族の陰謀, Hepburn: Yagyū Ichizoku no Inbō), is a 1978 Japanese historical martial arts period film directed and co-written by Kinji Fukasaku. The film is the first of two unrelated Fukasaku films to star Shinichi "Sonny" Chiba as Jūbei Mitsuyoshi Yagyū, the other being Samurai Reincarnation.

The film was adapted into a 39-episode TV series, The Yagyu Conspiracy (1978–1979), and two TV film remakes were released in 2008 and 2020.

== Plot ==
In 1624, shogun Tokugawa Hidetada dies suddenly. His food taster kills himself, leading to a suspicion of poisoning. Hidetada's first son, Iemitsu, was heir but his father, disliking his large facial birthmark and stammer, had favoured his popular second son, Tadanaga. Hidetada's widow is influencing ministers such as Lord Owari and Chief Chamberlain Doi, to back Tadanaga; Chamberlain Matsudaira and Lady Kasuga, leader of the harem, back Iemitsu. Scheming nobles Sanjo Saneeda and Ayamaro Karasumasu see an opportunity to overthrow the shogunate.

Ninjas hired by Doi remove Hidetada's heart to test for poison, but lose it to a group including Akane, daughter of Yagyu, Iemitsu's fencing instructor. Yagyu determines Hidetada was poisoned and confronts Kasuga and Matsudaira who admit to the crime, telling the innocent Iemitsu it was necessary to ensure his succession. Yagyu summons his son, Jubei, who has lived with the Negoro clan.

Hayate and Mon become Negoro fighters seeking to recover their Yamato Province lands, lost twenty years earlier. Their leader, Sagenta, agrees to Yagyu's appeal for help, sensing an opportunity; Jubei arrives as they kill Doi's Koga ninja spies.

Doi tells Tadanaga his father was poisoned by Iemitsu's retainers; they deny it and Iemitsu forbids a post mortem or any discussion. Tadanaga invites his mother to live with him. Yagyu promises the Negoro the return of their land in exchange for their promised help, asking if Mon will work for him.

Doi resigns to side with Tadanaga. Iemitsu makes Matsudaira Chief Chamberlain and Yagyu Inspector General and prepares to fight his brother. The court blocks Iemitsu's succession, hoping uncommitted lords will restore imperial power. Tadanaga refuses Iemitsu's offer of land if he withdraws and dismisses his mistress, Okuni, as he mobilises. Bekki Shōzaemon, his commander, drives off the Negoro, despite their false friendliness. Doi secures Lord Date's support for Tadanaga and recruits fighter Ogasawara Genshinsai who offers help in exchange for becoming fencing instructor and vows to kill Yagyu. As ronin gather in support, Doi promises to recruit other lords.

The Yagyu siblings, together with some Negoro, ambush Doi's party, but Karasumasu kills Samon, one of Yagyu's sons; they retreat when reinforcements arrive. Yagyu sends Mon to Kasuga's harem to guard Iemitsu. Genshinsai challenges Yagyu to a duel, but he declines the invitation on the grounds that he is the fencing instructor. When Genshinsai draws his sword, Jubei severs his left hand through the wall. After wounding Jubei, Genshinsai manages to escape. Genshinsai persuades his old swordfighting apprentice Yukinojo, who performs kabuki, to dress as a handmaiden and attack Iemitsu. Mon intervenes and is injured. Yagyu kills Yukinojo. Hayate brings Mon medicine.

The Yagyu siblings and Negoro attack Doi's party again. Doi, Akane and Segenta are killed. Yagyu sends Jubei to intimidate the nobles and he kills Karasumasu. The nobles abandon their plot and Saneeda visits Yagyu to disown it. Iemitsu sets off with Saneeda for Kyoto, while Tadanaga tries to reach the emperor first. The Negoro provide guns to the ronin supporting Tadanaga to attack Iemitsu en route, but they are slaughtered by concealed riflemen. It is a trick by Yagyu. Imperial envoy Saneeda is killed by a ronin. Yagyu kills every surviving ronin to hide his role. Realizing he will be blamed, Tadanaga turns back.

Lords abandon Tadanaga due to Saneeda's killing. Iemitsu orders Lord Ando to occupy Tadanaga's Sunpu Castle. Tadanaga surrenders to avoid bloodshed; Shōzaemon refuses, charges and is killed. Tadanaga is exiled to Takasaki. Jubei abandons his father and becomes a ronin. Genshinsai challenges Yagyu again but is killed.

Okuni visits Lord Owari at Nagoya Castle to dance, accompanied by the blinded Sanza, who denounces Yagyu's trick attack. To forestall an inquiry, Iemitsu has Yagyu order Tadanaga to perform seppuku. Sanza kills Okuni at her request. To cover his tracks, Yagju has the Negoro massacred. Yubei finds the bodies, including his children. Survivors Hayate and Mon tell him the attack was led by Yagyu's men.

Iemitsu becomes shogun, tells his dead father he has no regrets and reassures Yagyu that his Yagyu Shikage school will continue. Jubei arrives and beheads Iemitsu, then severs Yagyu's right hand. Holding the head, Yagyu tells the panicked court "it's all a dream."

== Cast ==
Actor	Role
Kinnosuke Yorozuya	Tajima-no-kami Yagyū Munenori
Shinichi Chiba	Yagyū Jūbei Mitsuyoshi
Hiroki Matsukata	Tokugawa Iemitsu
Teruhiko Saigō	Tokugawa Tadanaga
Reiko Ohara	Izumo no Okuni
Yoshio Harada	Nagoya Sanzaburō
Etsuko Shihomi	Yagyū Akane
Nobuo Kaneko	Kujō Michifusa
Kentaro Kudo	Matajūrō Yagyū Munefuyu
Jirō Yabuki	Yagyū Samon Taira-no-Tomonori
Hideo Murota	Negoro Sagenta
Hiroyuki Sanada	Hayate
Mayumi Asano	Man
Ichirō Nakatani	Amano Gyōbu
Tetsuro Tamba	Ogasawara Genshinsai
Etsushi Takahashi	Izu-no-kami Matsudaira Nobutsuna
Isao Natsuyagi	Bekki Shōzaemon
Mikio Narita	Karasuma Ayamaro
Sanae Nakahara	Lady Kasuga
Nobuo Kaneko	Kanpaku Kujō Michifusa
Shinsuke Ashida	Oi-no-kami Doi Toshikatsu
Isuzu Yamada	Oeyo
Toshirō Mifune	Owari Dainagon Tokugawa Yoshinao

== Release ==
In May 2022, Discotek Media announced they licensed the film in North America under their new Nihon Nights imprint. They released it on Blu-ray on September 27, 2022 as Shogun's Samurai: The Yagyu Clan Conspiracy.

== Accolades ==
The film received five Japan Academy Prize nominations, including best actor (Kinnosuke Yorozuya), best art direction (Norimichi Ikawa), best film, best screenplay (Kinji Fukasaku, Tatsuo Nogami, Hirō Matsuda), and best supporting actor (Shinichi Chiba).

== Adaptations ==
The film was adapted into a teleplay called The Yagyu Conspiracy which was broadcast by Kansai Telecasting Corporation for 39 one-hour TV episodes from 1978 to 1979. A TV movie remake starring Takaya Kamikawa as Jūbei and Hiroki Matsukata as Munenori aired on TV Asahi on September 28, 2008. A second TV movie remake starring Kōtarō Yoshida as Munenori and Junpei Mizobata as Jūbei aired on NHK BS Premium on April 11, 2020.
