= Tsuyoshi Nagabuchi =

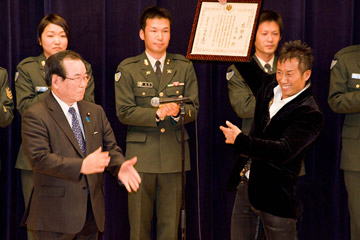
- Tsuyoshi Nagabuchi (right) with Yasuo Ichikawa (left), 2010

Background information
- Born: September 7, 1956 (age 69); Hioki, Kagoshima, Japan
- Origin: Hioki, Kagoshima, Japan
- Genres: Rock; folk
- Occupations: Musician, singer, songwriter, actor
- Years active: 1975–present
- Labels: Victor, Toshiba-EMI, For Life, Nayutawave
- Website: www.nagabuchi.or.jp

Tsuyoshi Nagabuchi (長渕 剛, Nagabuchi Tsuyoshi; born September 7, 1956) is a Japanese singer-songwriter, actor, poet, and human-rights advocate, who is a prominent figure in Japanese popular music.

He has sold more than 20 million records worldwide and has appeared in movies and television dramas. His wife Etsuko Shihomi is an actress.

== Early life ==
Tsuyoshi Nagabuchi was born on September 7, 1956, in Ijuin, Kagoshima, the first son of police officer Kuniharu Nagabuchi and Masuko Nagabuchi. As a child, Nagabuchi was sickly and often suffered from asthma attacks.

== Career ==
Nagabuchi favored popular Japanese folk singers such as Takuro Yoshida, Ryo Kagawa, Masato Tomobe and Kenji Endo. A song called "One Road Straight" changed his view of the world. Their protest songs tempted him to become a musician. Eagerness to realize his dream made him buy a nylon-string guitar at the age of 15. In 1973, when he was 17, he made his first performance as a live act. Around 1974, he formed a folk duo called "Takeshi and Tsuyoshi" and gained experience as a performer. In 1975, he entered Kyushu Sangyo University but eventually dropped out and chose the career of show business. At that time, he often performed at late-night bars. Some audiences booed him and threw bottles at him. Later, he reminisced about the old days and said that this unbearable experience trained his spirit.

=== Debut ===
His career as a solo artist began in the mid-1970s. In 1976, he took part in the well-known Yamaha Popular Music Song Contest, where he performed the song "Ame no Arashiyama" and won first prize. The next year, this song was released as his first single from JVC Victor Records (credited as Go Nagabuchi) and failed to chart. The approach of "Ame no Arashiyama" arranged by Motoki Funayama was enka-style and Nagabuchi wanted to avoid such a conservative style. Nevertheless, it was recorded and released despite his reluctance about the sound. Because of this treatment, he hates his debut single and would like to hide the existence of this song.

After the failed debut song, he contracted with Toshiba EMI and attempted to break onto the music scene again. His next single was "Junrenka", released on October 5, 1978. In later years, he released a re-recorded version and reached No. 1 on the Oricon charts. His debut album Kaze wa Minamikara was released in 1979. He released a second album the same year. It sold over 580,000 copies and provided his first No. 1 hit record on Oricon. The album Gyakuryū featured his early principal hit single "Junko." At first, it was included in the album only. Cut as a single in 1980, it hit the top of the Japanese singles chart in August of the same year. Following the success of the album and the single, he joined the ranks of the most popular singer-songwriters in Japan.

=== 1980s ===
In 1980, Nagabuchi released another well-known Japanese folk song classic, "Kanpai," which he wrote for his friend's wedding. It first appeared on the same-titled album and unreleased as a single; it gradually became famous around the country. In 1988, he recorded a new version for a single and it became his second No. 1 hit on the singles chart.

In his next three studio albums, Bye Bye, Jidai wa Bokura ni Ame o Furashiteru and Heavy Gauge, he attempted to get rid of the standard folk song style. After two successful albums in the early 1980s, commercial success of his albums and singles declined for about three years. "Goodbye Seishun" in autumn of 1983, his first smash-hit single since "Junko," was written with Yasushi Akimoto for the TV drama series he starred in. From the other drama program broadcast in 1982, he began acting career as a side job. He has appeared in 14 TV dramas and five movies, starring in several of them. In the 37th film of the movie series Otoko wa Tsurai yo in 1986, he acted with his future wife Etsuko Shihomi.

He disliked his own voice. To change it, he gargled with shōchū, and sang in an intentionally coarse voice. His voice gradually changed to a hoarse sound like Bob Dylan, whom he respected. The change of voice expression intensified his characteristics more and more. Thanks to such characteristic expression, he built deep-rooted popularity in the mid-1980s. From the 1987 album License to Captain of the Ship in 1993, his six studio albums consistently reached No. 1 on the Oricon album chart. In particular, Japan in 1991 sold over a million copies and became his most successful record. Similarly, on Shabondama, "Tombo," the first single cut from this album became a million-seller.

The Japanese version of The Expendables uses the song "Kizuna" by him as an Image song.

== Discography ==
=== Selected albums ===
- Gyakuryū (逆流, Counterflow) (1979)
- Kanpai (乾杯, Cheers) (1980)
- License (1987)
- Shōwa (昭和, Shōwa period) (1989)
- Jeep (1990)
- Japan (1991)
- Captain of the Ship (1993)
- Kazoku (家族, Family) (1996)
- Keep on Fighting (2003)
- Stay Alive (2012)
- Black Train (2017)
- Blood (2024)

=== Selected singles ===
- 'Junko' (順子) (1980)
- 'Kanpai' (乾杯, Cheers) (1988)
- 'Tonbo' (とんぼ, Dragonfly) (1988)
- 'Gekiai' (激愛, Intense Love) (1989)
- 'Shoppai Mikkazuki no Yoru' (しょっぱい三日月の夜, Night of the Salty Crescent Moon) (1989)
- 'Shabondama' (しゃぼん玉, Soap Bubbles) (1991)
- 'Junrenka '92' (巡恋歌'92) (1992)
- 'Run' (1993)
- 'Himawari' (ひまわり, Sunflower) (1997)
- 'Sotsugyou' (卒業, Graduation) (2009)
- 'Try Again For Japan' (2011)
- 'Hitotsu' (ひとつ, One) (2012)

== Filmography ==
=== Television ===
- Oh Sadaharu Monogatari (王貞治物語 Story of Sadaharu Oh) (1982)
- The Family Game (家族ゲーム Kazoku Geemu) (1983)
- The Family Game II (家族ゲームII Kazoku Geemu II) (1984)
- The Family Game Special (家族ゲームスペシャル Kazoku Geemu Supesharu) (1985)
- Oyako Game (親子ゲーム Parent-Child Game) (1986)
- Oyako Zigzag (親子ジグザグ Parent-Child Zigzag) (1987)
- Stand By Me (スタンド・バイ・ミー) (1988)
- Tombo (とんぼ Dragonfly) (1988)
- Usagi no Kyūjitsu (うさぎの休日 Holiday of the Rabbit) (1988)
- Shabondama (しゃぼん玉 Soap Bubbles) (1991)
- Run (RUN) (1993)
- Eiji Futatabi (英二ふたたび) (1997)
- Body Guard (ボディーガード) (1997)
- Shōnen "Okamesan" (少年「おかめさん」 Young Mr. Okame) (2002)

=== Film ===
- Hot Jam '80 (1980)
- Tora-san's Bluebird Fantasy (男はつらいよ 幸福の青い鳥, Kōfuku no Aoi Tori; 1986)
- Orgel (オルゴール) (1989)
- Water Moon (ウォータームーン) (1989)
- Eiji (英二) (1999)
- Family Bond (2020)

== See also ==
- List of best-selling music artists in Japan
