= The Bullet Train =

1975 Japanese film by Junya Satō

- Theatrical release poster
- Directed by: Junya Sato
- Screenplay by: Ryunosuke Ono; Junya Sato
- Based on: Ari Kato (concept)
- Produced by: Kanji Amao; Sunao Sakagami
- Starring: Ken Takakura; Sonny Chiba; Ken Utsui
- Cinematography: Masahiko Iimura; Masao Shimizu; Yoshikazu Yamazawa
- Edited by: Osamu Tanaka
- Music by: Hachiro Aoyama
- Distributed by: Toei Company
- Release date: 5 July 1975
- Running time: 152 minutes
- Country: Japan
- Language: Japanese
- Budget: ¥530 million
- Box office: ¥300 million (Japan rentals); 25.4 million tickets (overseas)

The Bullet Train (Japanese: 新幹線大爆破, Hepburn: Shinkansen Daibakuha; lit. 'The Shinkansen's Big Explosion') is a 1975 Japanese action thriller film directed by Junya Sato and starring Ken Takakura, Sonny Chiba, and Ken Utsui. When a Shinkansen ("bullet train") is threatened with a bomb that will explode automatically if it slows below 80 km/h unless a ransom is paid, police race to find the bombers and to learn how to defuse the bomb.

A sequel, Bullet Train Explosion, directed by Shinji Higuchi, premiered on Netflix on 23 April 2025.

== Plot ==
Tetsuo Okita is a former businessman who lost his manufacturing company to bankruptcy and separated from his wife and son a year earlier. Desperate to make ends meet and start over, he collaborates with activist Masaru Koga and his former employee Hiroshi Ōshiro in an elaborate plot to extort money from the government.

Hikari 109 is a high-speed 0 series bullet train carrying 1,500 passengers from Tokyo to Hakata. Shortly after the train's departure, railway security head Miyashita is notified by Okita that a bomb has been planted aboard and will explode if the train slows down below 80 km/h (50 mph). As proof that Okita is not bluffing, freight train 5790 bound from Yūbari to Oiwake is destroyed by a similar bomb. Hikari 109's conductor Aoki is informed by Shinkansen director Kuramochi not to slow down the train below 120 km/h while the security personnel aboard the train search for the bomb – thus delaying the trip to Hakata by three hours. Police officials back in Tokyo are tasked to either find the bomber or the bomb first.

Back aboard Hikari 109, passengers start becoming wary and demand for the train to stop when security does a second search. For the duration of the journey, Kuramochi must coordinate with Aoki on timing the train's speed and position to avoid incoming traffic while keeping it safe from the speed-sensitive detonator. Okita calls the National Railway authorities again; this time, he demands US$5 million in an aluminum suitcase in exchange for the safety of the train's passengers. As the Prime Minister prepares the ransom, police find their first lead when a cigarette pack containing fingerprints of Koga is found at Yūbari Station prior to freight train 5790's departure.

Meanwhile, passengers aboard Hikari 109 start to panic after the train passes through Nagoya, with a pregnant passenger named Kazuko Hirao going into labor. To settle down the passengers, co-engineer Kikuchi tells them of the bomb on board. National Railway officials are in further disdain when they realize that the bomb is attached to one of the train's wheels. Okita once more calls the officials and tells them to send the money northbound via helicopter and land at Yorii High School. Officer Senda, who carries the suitcase, is then instructed to travel down the Arakawa River; upon reaching Iwate, the suitcase is roped and pulled up a cliff by Ōshiro. However, Ōshiro is forced to drop the case and retreat when police yell at a university judo team jogging nearby. Fleeing via motorcycle, Ōshiro finds himself tailed by several squad cars until he collides with one and is killed after hitting a light post.

The passengers once again panic when a businessman threatens to pull the emergency door latch open as the train passes through Shin-Ōsaka; they are further exacerbated when they hear of Ōshiro's death on the radio. Meanwhile, police locate Koga, but fail to arrest him, despite shooting and wounding him during the chase. After Koga limps back to Okita's hideout, Okita ponders on giving up his mission, as he has failed to prevent any bloodshed, but Koga convinces him to carry on. As police trace the bomb parts to Okita's former company in Shimura, Okita makes another phone call and tells Miyashita to drop the money at an abandoned truck by the Kanda motorway in 10 minutes. After the police do as instructed, Okita takes the suitcase and makes his getaway. Back aboard the train, Kazuko loses her baby in a miscarriage and is in need of a blood transfusion. Okita then calls Miyashita and tells him to pick up a diagram of the bomb at Sun Plaza café in Shinbashi. Unfortunately, the café is destroyed in a fire by the time police arrive. When the police surround Okita's hideout, Koga blows himself up with a stick of dynamite rather than turn himself in.

With no other options left, Kuramochi goes on television to make an appeal for Okita to help them disarm the bomb. On the train, Shinji Fujio, a former accomplice of Okita being escorted after his arrest, reveals that Okita is on his way out of Japan using a false name. With the help of high-speed cameras, the Shinkansen authorities manage to locate the bomb underneath the second coach. Kuramochi relays the information to Aoki and sends a rescue train to provide welding equipment to cut an access hole over the bomb. Aoki succeeds in defusing the bomb, but the authorities suspect a second bomb located elsewhere underneath the train. Despite this, the government gives the order to stop the train. Aoki manages to stop Hikari 109 without incident. As Kuramochi leaves the main control room to regain his composure, he discovers that his appeal is still being broadcast on TV. Miyashita explains that this is part of the police's trap for Okita. Overwhelmed by the pressure of the day's situation, Kuramochi resigns from his position.

Meanwhile, at Haneda Airport, Okita prepares to board his flight, but his cover is blown when his ex-wife Yasuko Tomita and son Kenichi spot him. He is shot dead while attempting to escape outside the airport.

== Cast ==
- Ken Takakura as Tetsuo Okita
- Sonny Chiba as Aoki
- Ken Utsui as Kuramochi
- Fumio Watanabe as Miyashita
- Kei Yamamoto as Masaru Koga
- Eiji Gō as Shinji Fujio
- Akira Oda as Hiroshi Ōshiro
- Yasuhiro Aoki as Officer Senda
- Raita Ryū as Kikuchi
- Masayo Utsunomiya as Yasuko Tomita
- Yumiko Fujita as Dr. Akiyama
- Miyako Tasaka as Kazuko Hirao
- Etsuko Shihomi as Telephone operator
- Tetsurō Tamba as Sunaga
- Takashi Shimura as JNR president
- Akira Yamauchi as Cabinet chief secretary
- Tomoo Nagai as JNR bullet train general director
- Kunie Tanaka as Koga's brother
- Kin'ya Kitaōji as Detective at airport
- Tamio Kawachi as Satô
- Mizuho Suzuki as Hanamura
- Yumi Takigawa as SAS staff
- Jirō Chiba as Rescue train driver
- Rikinaga Nakano as Osaka businessman
- Saburo Date as Businessman
- Susumu Kurobe as Goto
- Yoshifumi Tajima as Saki

== Production ==
=== Writing ===
Toei Company president Shigeru Okasa asked director Junya Sato to come up with ideas for films similar to American suspense films of the time, such as The Towering Inferno and Earthquake, as he believed they would prove popular in Japan too. Sato and producer Sunao Sakagami decided to use the premise of what would happen if a bullet train could not stop. Sato and scenario writer Ryunosuke Ono stayed in a hotel at Mount Daisetsu for a month, where the former wrote the first half of the script, and the latter the second half. With knowledge from his former hobby of building radios, Sato knew there was a system that would turn a bomb on by itself once it reached a certain speed. According to the director, big corporations expanded during the Japanese economic miracle, but many small business were closing and the All-Japan Federation of Students had lost power. Thus they decided to focus on the bottom of society—those who lost small businesses, former student protestors, and young cheap laborers—for the three protagonists of the film, whose goal is to have the government pay compensation. Sato noted that this made The Bullet Train different than the previously mentioned American films.

Believing it would be too routine to have only "good" and "bad" guys, Sato used three to make the film more interesting; the Japanese National Railways (JNR), the police, and the rebels. The director said that when production asked the JNR for help, they took issue with the title "The Bullet Train's Big Explosion" and wanted it changed to something along the lines of "The Bullet Train's Close Call" or "The Bullet Train Dragnet", but Toei refused. Because they had to hold meetings, the JNR never answered questions right away, which caused production to fall a month behind schedule. As a result, Sato said they had to stay up all night in their final week and Toei approved what was basically the finished version without any notes because there was no time left.

=== Casting ===
Because of the film's problematic title, Sakagami felt they should have a prominent cast and went to great effort to get actors to agree. Sato noted how some of them only appear in a single scene where they normally would have used unknown actors. The director said they tried to cast Bunta Sugawara in the beginning, but he refused after his wife read the script and told him the train was the star and therefore it would do him no good to be in it. Sakagami then showed the script to Ken Takakura, who found it interesting despite having been negotiating to leave Toei for about the last six years. Sato had planned to use Yoshio Harada for the role of Koga, but he refused, and Kei Yamamoto ended up fitting the part perfectly. Ken Utsui, whom Sato saw a lot at the studio and had worked with previously, was chosen to play the "soft" element to Takakura's "hard" part. Sato remarked that Sonny Chiba made the "inconspicuous" role of the train engineer so much more "richer" than he was in the script.

=== Filming ===
Filming took 40 days. Two bullet train car sets and one Tokyo Station platform set were created for the film. Because the JNR did not provide any help, Sato said the toughest parts were the shots from the train windows and the engineer's cabin. They had a cameraman ride the train and secretly film footage that they used via blue screen. They were also refused permission to film the control room containing all of the train schedules. So Sato said they had a foreign actor lie to the JNR saying he was a German train engineer to gain access and secretly film the room so they could then build their own. Miniature sets were used, particularly for the scene where two trains pass each other by in Hamamatsu. The special effects department rented a snorkel camera to shoot that specific scene, which cost around a million yen a day.

== Release ==
The Bullet Train premiered in Japan on 5 July 1975. The film was released in North America on 1 January 1976. It was re-titled Super Express 109 for its release in France on 30 June 1976. Sato said the film was a big hit in France, and remarked that when foreign distributors buy a movie, it "seems" to include the right to edit it.

== Reception ==
According to Sato, the Japanese box office was "on the border of profit and loss" with one of the main reasons being they could not hold a premiere, which would have provided indirect advertising. The film was initially a box office failure in Japan, earning ¥300 million in distributor rentals against a ¥530 million budget, which has been attributed to a lack of publicity at the time. However, readers of Kinema Junpo voted The Bullet Train the best film of the year, which caused it to be re-released to Japanese theaters.

The film also had overseas success in France, where it became a box office hit and sold 440,638 tickets. In the Soviet Union, the film sold over 25 million tickets.

== Home media ==
U.S. DVD cover

Toei Video released the film on DVD on 21 June 2002. On 9 December 2005, Toei released a special two-disc "Overseas Edition" (海外版, Kaigai Han) DVD featuring the French and English versions. The film was released on Blu-ray on 25 October 2017.

The U.S. version of The Bullet Train was bundled with Golgo 13: Assignment Kowloon and Executioner in the Kill Chiba Collection Region 1 DVD set by Crash Cinema on 18 May 2004. On 20 November 2007, BCI Eclipse released both the original Japanese and English versions of the film in their Sonny Chiba Collection DVD set, which also includes Golgo 13: Assignment Kowloon, Dragon Princess, The Bodyguard, Karate Warriors, and Sister Street Fighter. The original Japanese version was released on Blu-ray by Twilight Time on 13 December 2016, with a limited run of 3,000 units. In November 2023, Discotek Media released a 2K restoration of the film, along with the English version reconstructed from the 2K remaster, on Blu-ray in North America.

In the UK, the English dub of the film was bundled with Golgo 13: Assignment Kowloon and G.I. Samurai in The Sonny Chiba Collection Vol. 2 Region 2 DVD set by Optimum Home Releasing. Eureka Entertainment released the film on Blu-ray on 24 April 2023.

== Legacy ==
=== Novelization ===
A novelization of the film was written by Trevor Hoyle (under his pseudonym Joseph Rance) and Arei Kato, and released in 1980, and featured as a Reader's Digest Condensed Book in early 1981.

=== Sequel ===
A sequel of The Bullet Train was released on 23 April 2025, on Netflix, directed by Shinji Higuchi and starring Tsuyoshi Kusanagi. The sequel is set on the Hayabusa service with full cooperation from JR East unlike its predecessor.

=== Similar films ===
The Burning Train is a 1980 Indian film with a similar premise.

The 1994 American action film Speed was inspired by both Runaway Train and The Bullet Train. Screenwriter Graham Yost was told by his father, Canadian television host Elwy Yost, about a 1985 film called Runaway Train starring Jon Voight, about a train that speeds out of control. Elwy mistakenly believed that the train's situation was due to a bomb on board. Such a theme had in fact been used in The Bullet Train. After seeing the Voight film, Graham decided that it would have been better if there had been a bomb on board a bus with the bus being forced to travel at 20 mph to prevent an actual explosion. A friend suggested that this be increased to 50 mph.

Tezz (2012) is an unofficial Indian adaptation with many elements from this film.

Bullet Train Down is a 2022 mockbuster from The Asylum that is similar to The Bullet Train.
