= The Return of the Sister Street Fighter =

The Return of the Sister Street Fighter 帰って来た女必殺拳
- Film poster
- Directed by: Kazuhiko Yamaguchi
- Written by: Masahiro Kakefuda; Takeo Kaneko
- Starring: Etsuko Shihomi; Yasuaki Kurata
- Cinematography: Masahiko Iimura
- Music by: Shunsuke Kikuchi
- Distributed by: Toei Company
- Release date: 1975
- Running time: 77 minutes
- Country: Japan
- Language: Japanese

The Return of the Sister Street Fighter (帰って来た女必殺拳, Kaettekita: On'na Hissatsu-ken) is a 1975 Japanese martial arts film directed by Kazuhiko Yamaguchi and starring Etsuko Shihomi. This film is a threequel to both Sister Street Fighter (1974) and Sister Street Fighter: Hanging by a Thread (1974).

== Cast ==
- Etsuko Shihomi as Lǐ Hóng-Lóng (Li Kōryū)
- Yasuaki Kurata as Go Kurosaki
- Akane Kawasaki as Xiu-Li (Shurei)
- Miwa Cho as Li-Hua (Reika)
- Mitchi Love as Michi Katahira
- Jirō Chiba as Xiang De-Ki (Sho Tokki)
- Rinichi Yamamoto as Wang Long-Ming

== Reception ==
Matt Paprocki from the website "DoBlu" gave the film three out of five stars and wrote: "A highlight reel of its predecessors, Return of the Sister Street Fighter isn't one for original ideas, but it's still a goofy blast of fun". Don Anelli from the "Asian Movie Pulse" said: "With some engaging action and a lot to really like elsewhere, Return of Sister Street Fighter returns to the fun of the original even with some of the same problems that emerged in the previous entry as the flaws are just a touch more enhanced here. Give this one a shot if you've made it this far in the series or just looking for a light, breezy action film while those looking to get more out of their films should heed caution". David Brook from the online magazine Blueprintreview wrote about the Sister Street Fighter series of films, giving it three and a half stars out of five and stating: "So, the films in the set are flawed, with a little too much repetition and perhaps the first three could have benefitted from a breather here and there in amongst the near-constant fighting. The fourth film goes too far the other way, lacking the energy of its predecessors, but regardless, the films are a lot of fun. With lashings of gore, high-quality martial arts sequences with wacky flourishes thrown in to the mix, they'll be sure to please fans of Japanese genre movies".
