= Ronin of the Wilderness =

- Also known as: 荒野の素浪人
- Genre: Jidaigeki
- Directed by: Eiichi Kudo; Tokuzō Tanaka; Kazuo Ikehiro
- Starring: Toshiro Mifune; Meiko Kaji; Mayumi Ogawa; Shun Oide; Jiro Sakagami
- Narrated by: Minori Terada(season1); Shin Kishida(season2)
- Theme music composer: Shunsuke Kikuchi(season1), Masaru Sato(season2)
- Country of origin: Japan
- Original language: Japanese
- No. of series: 2
- No. of episodes: 104

Production
- Running time: 45 minutes (per episode)
- Production company: Mifune production

Original release
- Network: NET
- Release: 1972 – 1974

Ronin of the Wilderness (荒野の素浪人, Kōya no surōnin) is a Japanese television jidaigeki or period drama that was broadcast between 1972 and 1974. It was inspired by Akira Kurosawa's Sanjuro and the Western genre. The lead star is Toshiro Mifune. The complete DVD box was released in 2007.

== Cast ==
- Toshiro Mifune as Tōge Kujūrō
- Meiko Kaji as Ofumi (season1)
- Mayumi Ogawa as Oryu (season1)
- Jirō Sakagami as Jirokichi
- Shun Oide

== Season ==
- 1st (1972–73) 65 episodes
- 2nd (1974) 39 episodes
