= Karate Warriors =

- Film poster
- Directed by: Kazuhiko Yamaguchi
- Written by: Tatsuhiko Kamoi; Nobuaki Nakajima
- Starring: Sonny Chiba; Isao Natsuyagi; Akiko Koyama; Akane Kawasaki; Hideo Murota
- Cinematography: Yoshio Nakajima
- Edited by: Osamu Tanaka
- Music by: Taichiro Kosugi
- Distributed by: Toei Company
- Release date: April 10, 1976 (Japan)
- Running time: 87 minutes
- Country: Japan
- Language: Japanese

Karate Warriors, originally titled in Japan as Kozure Satsujin-ken, is a 1976 Japanese martial arts film starring Sonny Chiba.

== Plot ==
Wandering karate master Shuhei Sakata ("Chieko" in the English-dub) stops by a port town where he meets a child named Osamu and his father Rensaku Mizuki, also a master of kenjutsu with a trained katana. Shuhei and Mizuki initially suspect each other of murderous intent, but they set aside their differences and do not fight. Shuhei also needs work and goes to work for one of the local gang bosses. His intent is to intensify the feud between gangs in order to make more money as a mercenary. Unfortunately, Mizuki is hired muscle for the other side, leading to an inevitable confrontation between the two men.

== Cast ==
- Sonny Chiba
- Isao Natsuyagi
- Akiko Koyama
- Akane Kawasaki
- Hideo Murota
- Eiji Gô
- Bin Amatsu
- Nenji Kobayashi
- Yayoi Watanabe
- Tatsuo Umemiya

== Release ==
Silverstein Films, founded by former Cambist and Monarch Films executive Sam Silverstein, released the film in America in 1980, with a dub track prepared by Titra Studios, and some opening scenes rearranged in a different order. The movie was later issued on videocassette by Independent United Distributors in 1982.

In 1991, when 14 fighting movies starring Chiba were revived in Los Angeles, this work was also screened.

On November 20, 2007, BCI Eclipse released the American edit of the film in their Sonny Chiba Collection DVD set, which also includes Golgo 13: Assignment Kowloon, The Bullet Train, Dragon Princess, Karate Kiba, and Sister Street Fighter.

On November 14, 2023, Shout! Studios released the original Japanese edit of the film in their Sonny Chiba Collection, Volume 2 Blu-ray set, which also includes The Defensive Power of Aikido, 13 Steps of Maki, The Great Okinawa Yakuza War, Karate for Life, Golgo 13: Assignment Kowloon, and The Okinawa War of Ten Years. An audio commentary track was recorded by martial arts film historians Chris Poggiali (co-author of These Fists Break Bricks) and Marc Walkow.
