= Mount Shizuhata =

Mountain in Shizuoka Japan

- 賤機山
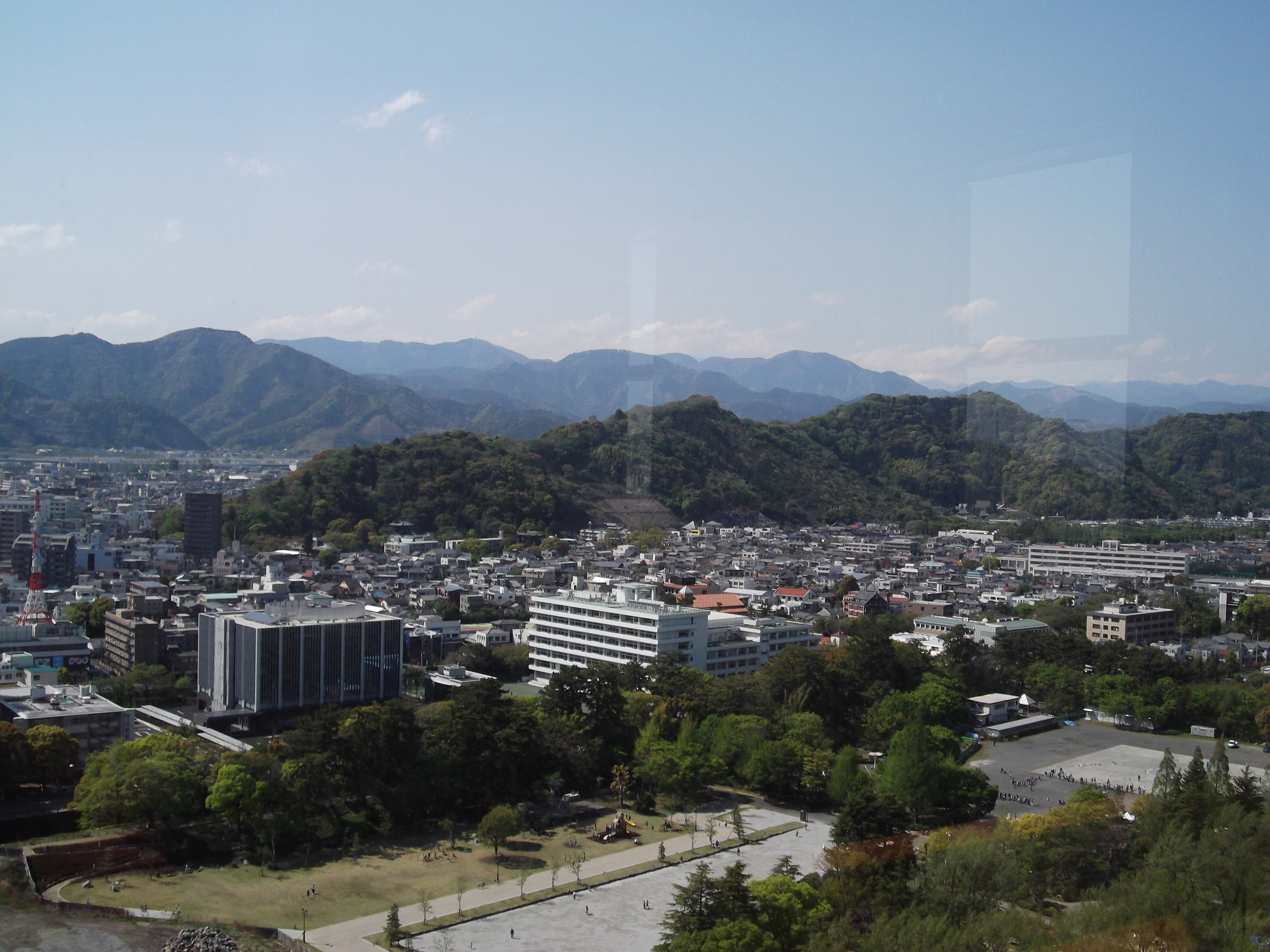

Highest point
- Elevation: 171 m (561 ft)
- Coordinates: 34°59′42″N 138°22′30″E

Geography
- Location within Japan
- Location: Aoki-ku, Shizuoka, Shizuoka Prefecture, Japan

Climbing
- Easiest route: Hiking

Mount Shizuhata (賤機山, Shizuhata-yama) is a mountain located in Shizuoka Prefecture, Japan. It has a height of 171 metres (561 ft). The southern half of the mountain is called Mount Asama. It is said to be the origin of "Shizu" in "Shizuoka".
