= Sister Street Fighter =

1974 film directed by Kazuhiko Yamaguchi

- Theatrical release poster

Japanese name
- Kanji: 女必殺拳
- Hiragana: おんなひっさつけん
Transcriptions
- Revised Hepburn: On'na Hissatsu-ken
- Directed by: Kazuhiko Yamaguchi
- Written by: Masahiro Kakefuda; Norifumi Suzuki
- Produced by: Kenji Takamura
- Starring: Etsuko Shihomi; Emi Hayakawa; Hiroshi Miyauchi; Sanae Ōhori; Asao Uchida; Bin Amatsu; Sonny Chiba
- Cinematography: Yoshio Nakajima
- Edited by: Osamu Nakata
- Music by: Shunsuke Kikuchi
- Production company: Toei Company
- Distributed by: Toei Company
- Release date: August 31, 1974
- Running time: 86 minutes
- Country: Japan
- Language: Japanese

Sister Street Fighter (Japanese: 女必殺拳, Hepburn: On'na Hissatsu-ken; lit. "Woman's Deadly Fist") is a 1974 Japanese martial arts film directed by Kazuhiko Yamaguchi. Produced and distributed by Toei Company, it is a standalone spin-off of The Street Fighter (1974), and is the first entry in a trilogy of films starring Etsuko Shihomi as Shorinji Kempo practitioner Kōryū Li. It was followed by Sister Street Fighter: Hanging by a Thread (1974) and The Return of the Sister Street Fighter (1975).

== Plot ==
When Mansei Li, a shorinji kempo champion and Hong Kong drug agent, goes missing during an investigation into the activities of a dummy corporation called Central Export, his sister, Kōryū, is called in to continue the investigation in his place. She travels to Yokohama to follow up Mansei's last lead at a nightclub called Mandarin. In Yokohama, she visits her uncle, who operates a restaurant, and her cousins Jirō and Reiko. At Club Mandarin, she receives a red rose, the signal to look for Mansei's partner in the investigation, Fanshin, a stripper at the club. When assassins for Central Export abduct Fanshin, Kōryū takes them on single-handedly, but they manage to capture Fanshin and load her in their car, which is then hijacked by shorinji kempo student Seiichi Hibiki, who proceeds to transport her to the ballet studio operated by his girlfriend, Shinobu.

Furious at his minions for failing him, Ryōzō Hayashi hires a mercenary, Kazunao Inubashiri, to spy on the shorinji kempo school, led by Tetsudo Fujita. When Kōryū stops by, she's formally introduced to Seiichi and another student, Emi Hayakawa. After Seiichi assures Kōryū that Fanshin's alright, she hurries over to Shinobu's ballet studio to question Fanshin. After Fanshin reveals that Mansei was captured, she gives Kōryū a necklace before spasming from drug withdrawals, as Inubashiri's minions attack the ballet studio. Kōryū and Shinobu successfully ward them off, but Fanshin is killed in a sneak attack using a poison dart.

Emi swears the shorinji kempo school's allegiance to Kōryū in her investigation as she stumbles across another piece of evidence in the form of a lock of hair. Central Export's leader, Shigetomi Kakuzaki, offers Inubashiri a great reward if he disposes of Kōryū. After Kōryū clears out several minions, she encounters Inubashiri, and they fight on a bridge. Inubashiri reveals the truth to Kōryū, that Mansei is still alive and captive in Kakuzaki's dungeon, before sending her off the bridge into an apparent watery grave. Emi does her own espionage work and helps Kōryū destroy a warehouse owned by Central Export.

Though Kakuzaki is furious at Inubashiri, he allows him and his minions to directly attack the shorinji kempo school with the hope that the attack will also lead to Kōryū's demise in the process. Seiichi successfully wards off the ambush in a one-on-one duel against Inubashiri himself, though, and when Inubashiri subsequently sinks into a depression and starts to drink himself to death, a frustrated Kakuzaki is forced to use her uncle against her by forcing him to divulge a false lead. Kakuzaki believes Kōryū will be killed by his minions, but Kōryū manages to stop them. She returns to her uncle's restaurant with Emi just as he's killed by a poison dart in front of the cousins.

Kōryū returns to Central Export and enters the dungeon, where she extracts Mansei right before a sinister minister wielding an arrow gun offs him before her eyes. Kōryū herself is dropped into a pit and nearly killed when Kakuzaki ties her by her feet above a bed of spikes, but as he burns the rope she breaks free and throws his mistress onto the bed of spikes. She then proceeds to take down several more minions before confronting Hayashi and killing him by twisting his neck. Seiichi, Emi, and Shinobu arrive as backup and kill many of the remaining minions, including Inubashiri. Kōryū takes on Kakuzaki herself and kills him with his own claw hand.

== Cast ==
Similar to The Street Fighter, several of the cast members are credited under anglicized stage names in the English dub, such as "Sue Shiomi", "May Hayakawa", and "Milton Ishibashi". Several character names also differ between the Japanese and English versions.

- Etsuko Shihomi as Kōryū Li (Chinese: 李紅竜; pinyin: Lǐ Hónglóng, "Tina Long" in the English dub)
- Sonny Chiba as Seiichi Hibiki ("Sonny Hibachi")
- Emi Hayakawa as Emi Hayakawa ("Emmy Kawasaki")
- Hiroshi Miyauchi as Mansei Li (李万青; Lǐ Wànqīng, "Lee Long")
- Sanae Ōhori as Shinobu Kojō
- Masashi Ishibashi as Kazunao Inubashiri ("Hammerhead")
- Asao Uchida as Tetsudo Fujita
- Bin Amatsu as Shigetomi Kakuzaki ("Kaki")
- Hiroshi Kondō as Gyokudō Li (李玉堂; Lǐ Yùtáng)
- Xiè Xiùróng as Fanshin (翻身; Fānshēn, "Fanny Singer")
- Tatsuya Nanjō as Jirō Li (李次郎; Lǐ Cìláng, "Jerry")
- Nami Tachibana as Reiko Li (李麗子; Lǐ Lìzǐ, "Remi")
- Shōhei Yamamoto as Ryōzō Hayashi
- Seiya Satō as Murakami
- Toshiyuki Tsuchiyama as Kurokawa
- Tatsuya Kameyama as Shimura
- Teruo Shimizu as Hamano
- Kengo Miyaji as Kizaki
- Gozo Soma as Hong Kong Police Chief

== Production ==
Etsuko Shihomi was a member of Sonny Chiba's Japan Action Club (JAC), and had previously played a supporting role in The Street Fighter. After the success of that film, a Sister Street Fighter was rushed into a production with Shihomi in the lead. Although the English title presents it as a spinoff of The Street Fighter, there is no narrative link between the two, with Shihomi and Chiba playing different characters.

The film was shot on-location in Yokohama and at Toei's studios in Tokyo. Shorinji Kempo founder Doshin So, whom Chiba later portrayed in the movie The Killing Machine (1975), contributed to the film's fight choreography.

Emi Hayakawa was a shorinji kempo classmate of Shihomi's, Sister Street Fighter was her film debut.

== Release ==
The film was released in Japan by Toei on August 31, 1974. In the United States, it was dubbed and re-edited by New Line Cinema, who had previously released The Street Fighter. Similar to its predecessors, Sister Street Fighter was initially rated X for violence when first presented to the MPAA. New Line then cut approximately 6 minutes of graphic footage, removing all shots with considerable amounts of blood and gore.

=== Home media ===
In November 2007, BCI Eclipse released the film in their Sonny Chiba Collection DVD set, which also includes Golgo 13: Assignment Kowloon, The Bullet Train, Dragon Princess, Karate Kiba, and Karate Warriors. A year earlier, they released the whole Sister Street Fighter Movie Collection with the original Japanese mono and a 5.1 remix, English-dubbed versions and optional English subtitles.

In 2019, Arrow Video re-released the collection in Blu-Ray with high definition transfers of all the films.
