= Yayoi Watanabe =

Japanese actress

- Born: 24 August 1952 (age 73); Tokyo, Japan
- Occupation: Actress
- Years active: 1971-1979

Yayoi Watanabe (渡辺やよい, Watanabe Yayoi; born 24 August 1952) is a Japanese actress. She appeared in many Toei films including Pinky violence films. In 1979, she married sumo wrestler Tatsuya Kurama and retired. After his 1995 death from leukemia, Watanabe wrote an autobiographical book about him which was adapted into a TV drama.

== Selected filmography ==
=== Film ===
- Shin Harenchi Gakuen (1971)
- Wandering Ginza Butterfly (1972)
- Female Prisoner 701: Scorpion (1972)
- Female Prisoner Scorpion: 701's Grudge Song (1973)
- Karate Kiba (1973)
- School of the Holy Beast (1974)
- Cross the Rubicon! (1975)
- Violent Panic: The Big Crash (1976)
- Karate Warriors (1976)
- Okinawa Jūnen Sensou (1978)

=== Television ===
- playgirl (1972)
- Unmeitōge (1974) as Sasaka
- G-Men '75 (1975–79) Guest (ep.13,19,63,71,166,199)
- Space Ironman Kyodain (1976)
- Monkey (1979) Guest (ep,26)
- Hattori Hanzō: Kage no Gundan (1980) Guest (ep,19)
