= Shadow Warriors (TV series) =

- Also known as: 影の軍団
- Kage no Gundan
- Genre: Jidaigeki; Ninja
- Starring: Sonny Chiba; Etsuko Shihomi; Hiroyuki Sanada; So Yamamura; Kirin Kiki; Junichi Haruta; Teruhiko Saigō; Shôhei Hino; Kantarō Suga; Renji Ishibashi; Kaho Shimada; Mikio Narita
- Narrated by: Asao Koike (1-2); Isao Hashizume (3); Akira Kume (4-5)
- Theme music composer: Shigeki Watanabe
- Ending theme: "G no Inori" by Nobuyasu Okabayashi (Series 1)
- Country of origin: Japan
- Original language: Japanese
- No. of series: 5
- No. of episodes: 119

Production
- Running time: 46 minutes (per episode)
- Production companies: KTV; Toei Company

Original release
- Network: FNS (KTV, Fuji TV)
- Release: April 1, 1980 – December 30, 1985

Shadow Warriors (影の軍団, Kage no Gundan; lit. "Army of Shadows") is a Japanese television jidaigeki show featuring Sonny Chiba that ran for four seasons in the early 1980s. The first season was a reimagining of the 1980 film Kage no Gundan: Hattori Hanzō directed by Eiichi Kudo.

Chiba played different ninja characters in each series. In the first series he played Hattori Hanzō III, in the second he played Tsuge Shinpachi, in the third he played Tarao Hanzō, and in the fourth series and in Bakumatsu Hen he played Hattori Hanzō XV. In the 2003 direct-to-DVD series Shin Kage no Gundan (New Shadow Warriors), he played Hattori Hanzō I.

== Seasons ==
- Hattori Hanzō: Kage no Gundan (1980) - 27 episodes
- Kage no Gundan II (1981 - 1982) - 26 episodes
- Kage no Gundan III (1982) - 26 episodes
- Kage no Gundan IV (1985) - 27 episodes
- Kage no Gundan Bakumatsu Hen (1985) - 13 episodes
- Shin Kage no Gundan (2003 - 2005) - 6 direct to video movies

== DVD release ==
The complete first season of the show was released on April 17, 2007, on Region 1 DVD by BCI Home Entertainment.

== In other media ==
Chiba reprised the Hattori Hanzō character for Kill Bill. Quentin Tarantino stated in the supplementary material on the Kill Bill DVD that the character was named in tribute to Chiba's former role as Hattori Hanzō (the historical 16th-century Iga ninja) in Shadow Warriors (Kage no Gundan). The joke is that Chiba played multiple generations of the character: when the character died, the next installment would shift to covering his descendant, also named Hanzō after his famous predecessor. The implication is that the character in Kill Bill, whom Tarantino called Hattori Hanzō XIV, is another descendant of the same lineage. Chiba's daughter Juri Manase also appears in Kill Bill as a member of the Crazy 88. A digitized version of a promo image for the series' second season infamously appears on the title screen of The Revenge of Shinobi.

== Cast ==
=== Hattori Hanzō: Kage no Gundan (Season 1) ===
- Sonny Chiba as Hattori Hanzō
- Kenji Takaoka as Hyōroku
- Naomi Hase as Okiri
- Shōhei Hino as Daihachi
- Junichi Haruta as Kiheiji
- Kyoko Mitsubayashi as Okō
- Kantarō Suga as Minakuchi Kisanta
- Renji Ishibashi as Minakuchi Kisirō
- Hiroshi Inuzuka as ikoma
- Nobuo Kaneko as Sakai Tadakiyo
- Teruhiko Saigō as Tsutusmi Kyonosuke
- So Yamamura as Hoshina Masayuki
- Kirin Kiki as Orin
- Yōko Kurita as O-ume
- Hikaru Kurosaki as Arisuke

=== Kage no Gundan II (Season 2) ===
- Sonny Chiba as Tsuge Shinpachi
- Jun Eto as Tsuruzō
- Masato Hoshi as Utanosuke
- Hikaru Kurosaki (ja:黒崎輝) as Koroku
- Mayumi Asaka as Otoki
- Isamu Nagato as Gohei
- Etsuko Shihomi as Shiina Misato
- Mikio Narita as Ōoka Tadamitsu
- So Yamamura as Hiraga Gennai
- Hiroyuki Sanada as Hayate Kozō
- Kirin Kiki as Orin

=== Kage no Gundan III (Season 3) ===
- Sonny Chiba as Tarao Hanzō
- Etsuko Shihomi as Ochō
- Hiroyuki Sanada as Sasuke
- Keizō Kanie as Takebayashi Toramaro
- Hikaru Kurosaki as Shunta
- Kawarasaki Kenzō as Ryuken
- Kyoko Kishida as Takatsukasa Takako
- Yoko Akino as Kobue
- Eitaro Ozawa as Tokugawa Mitsusada

=== Kage no Gundan IV (Season 4) ===
- Sonny Chiba as Hattori Hanzō
- Isao Hashizume as Hyōsai
- Kimiko Ikegami as Satsuki
- Jun Miho as Ayame
- Junichi Ishida as Kikuji
- Kenji Ohba as Gamahachi
- Tsuyoshi Ihara as Zenkyu
- MIE as Ochō
- Etsuko Shihomi as Oren
- Hikaru Kurosaki as Junta
- Mari Chihara as Toki
- Hiroyuki Sanada as Katsu Kaishū
- Mikio Narita as Ii Naosuke
- Gaku Yamamoto as Hotta Masayoshi
- Kantaro Suga as Murayama Taizō
- Masanori Sera as Sakamoto Ryoma
- Bunjaku Han as Osai
- Kirin Kiki as Botan

=== Kage no Gundan Bakumatsu Hen (Season 5) ===
- Sonny Chiba as Hattori Hanzō
- Isao Hashizume as Hyōsai
- Kenji Ohba as Gamahachi
- Tsuyoshi Ihara as Zenkyu
- MIE as Ochō
- Isao Natsuyagi as Oguri Kozukenosuke
- Hiroyuki Sanada as Katsu Kaishū
- Masanori Sera as Sakamoto Ryoma
- Seiichirō Kameishi as Tateoka Dōsetsu
- Kirin Kiki as Botan
