= Shunsuke Kikuchi =

Japanese composer (1931–2021)

- 菊池 俊輔
- Born: November 1, 1931; Hirosaki, Aomori, Japan
- Died: April 24, 2021 (aged 89); Tokyo, Japan
- Education: Nihon University
- Occupations: Composer; arranger
- Years active: 1961–2017

Shunsuke Kikuchi (菊池 俊輔, Kikuchi Shunsuke; November 1, 1931 – April 24, 2021) was a Japanese composer who was active from the early 1960s until 2017. He specialized in incidental music for media such as television and film. Kikuchi was regarded as one of Japan's most highly demanded film and TV composers, working principally on tokusatsu and anime, popular action films, jidaigeki, and television dramas.

== Biography ==
=== Early life and education ===
Kikuchi was born on November 1, 1931, in the city of Hirosaki in Aomori Prefecture. He graduated from Aomori Prefectural Hirosaki Technical High School, specializing in mechanics. Kikuchi then attended the Nihon University College of Art.

=== Career ===
After graduating from the Nihon University College of Art, he made his debut composing for the 1961 film The Eighth Enemy (八人目の敵). The Tō-Ō Nippō Press wrote that the contrast between the heroic opening theme and the melancholic ballad ending theme that Kikuchi composed for the 1969 Tiger Mask anime, "changed Japanese anime music." Kikuchi composed the song "Urami Bushi" (怨み節), sung by Meiko Kaji, for the early 1970s Female Convict Scorpion series, which was included in the American film Kill Bill and on its soundtrack. The Tō-Ō Nippō Press also wrote that the success of the TV drama Abarenbō Shōgun, which aired for 800 episodes from 1978 to 2008, had people say; "If Shunsuke Kikuchi is in charge of the music, the show will be a hit."

In 1975, he composed the soundtrack for the anime UFO Robo Grendizer. In 1976, Kikuchi composed the music for Divine Demon-Dragon Gaiking (大空魔竜ガイキング, Daikū Maryū Gaikingu); in 1979 composed "Doraemon no Uta", the theme song of the Doraemon anime, which ran on TV for 26 years. Up-tempo works like those in Kamen Rider and Abarenbō Shōgun form the majority of Kikuchi's works, while his slow background music from long-running series have become some of his best-known works. Some notable works that he composed for, include anime and tokusatsu such as Doraemon, Kamen Rider, Dragon Ball, Dragon Ball Z, jidaigeki such as Abarenbō Shōgun and Chōshichirō Edo Nikki, and TBS Saturday-night productions ranging from Key Hunter to G-Men '75 became long-running hit series.

=== Retirement and death ===
Kikuchi ceased composing music in 2017, stating that he was taking a break in order to be treated for an illness. Kikuchi died while being treated for pneumonia in a hospital in Tokyo on April 24, 2021. His death was announced four days later.

== Awards ==
In 1983 Kikuchi was nominated for the Japan Academy Prize for Music for his work on The Gate of Youth: Part 2 and To Trap a Kidnapper. He received an Award of Merit at the 2013 Tokyo Anime Awards.

Kikuchi has won several annual awards from the Japanese Society for Rights of Authors, Composers and Publishers based on the royalties he earned from his works in the previous year. He won the International Award, which is based on foreign income, in 1983 (UFO Robot Grendizer), 1989 (UFO Robot Grendizer), 2008 (Dragon Ball Z), 2010 (Doraemon), 2012 (Doraemon), 2015 (Dragon Ball Z), 2016 (Kiteretsu Daihyakka), 2018 (Dragon Ball Z), and 2019 (Dragon Ball Z). He came in second in overall royalties in 2004 (Dragon Ball Z). In 2015, he received a lifetime achievement award at the 57th Japan Record Awards.

== Selected works ==
- Abare Hasshū Goyō Tabi (1991-1994)
- Arcadia of My Youth: Endless Orbit SSX (1982-1983)
- The Unfettered Shogun (1978)
- Arabian Nights: Sinbad's Adventures (1975-1976)
- Babel II (1973)
- Casshan (1973-1974)
- Castle of Sand (1977)
- Chōshichirō Edo Nikki (1983-1991)
- Daimos (1978-1979)
- Danguard Ace (1977-1978)
- Denjin Zaborger (1974-1975)
- Doraemon (1979-2005)
- Dotakon (1981)
- Dr. Slump and Arale-chan (1981-1986)
- Dragon Ball (1986-1989)
- Dragon Ball Z (1989-1996)
- Dragon Ball: Yo! Son Goku and His Friends Return!! (2008)
- Dragon Ball Z Kai (2011, replacing Kenji Yamamoto; music taken from Dragon Ball Z)
- Dragon Princess (1976)
- Female Convict 701: Scorpion (1972)
- Gaiking (1976-1977)
- Gamera vs. Guiron (1969)
- Gamera vs. Jiger (1970)
- Gamera vs. Zigra (1971)
- Gamera: Super Monster (1980)
- G-Men '75 (1975-82)
- Getter Robo (1974-1975) and Getter Robo G (1975-1976)
- Goke, Body Snatcher from Hell (1968)
- High School! Kimengumi (1985-1987)
- Hurricane Polymar (1974-1975)
- Iron King (1972-1973)
- Jumborg Ace (1973)
- Kamen Rider (first series - ZX) (1971-1984)
- Kamen Rider Black RX (1989) 11 Rider Dai-Sanka
- Kiteretsu Daihyakka (1988-1996)
- Kure Kure Takora (1973-1974)
- La Seine no Hoshi (1975-1976)
- Message from Space: Galactic Wars (1978-1979) (with Kenichiro Morioka)
- Little Ghost Q-Taro (1985-1987)
- Robot Detective (1973)
- Ronin of the Wilderness (1972-1974)
- Sakigake!! Otokojuku (1988)
- Sister Street Fighter (1974)
- Sci-Fi West Saga Starzinger (1978-1979)
- Tenchi in Tokyo (1997)
- Terror Beneath the Sea (1966)
- The Fierce Battles of Edo (1979)
- The Gate of Youth: Part 2 (1982)
- Tiger Mask (1969-1971) and Tiger Mask II (1981-1982)
- Tōyama no Kin-san (with Ryōtarō Sugi)
- Uchu Enban Daisenso (1975)
- UFO Robo Grendizer (1975-1977)
- Zero Woman: Red Handcuffs (1974)
