= Bodyguard Kiba (1973 film) =

- Theatrical release poster
- Directed by: Ryuichi Takamori; Simon Nuchtern (US footage)
- Written by: Ryūzō Nakanishi
- Screenplay by: Ikki Kajiwara
- Based on: Bodyguard Kiba by Ikki Kajiwara; Ken Nakagusuku
- Produced by: Susumu Yoshikawa; Terry Levene (US footage)
- Starring: Sonny Chiba; Rinichi Yamamoto; Masutatsu Ōyama; Ryōhei Uchida
- Cinematography: Yohio Najakima; Yoshio Nakajima; Joel Shapiro (US footage)
- Edited by: Osamu Tanaka
- Music by: Toshiaki Tsushima; Maurice Sarli (US release)
- Release dates: May 24, 1973 (Japan); September 1, 1976 (United States)
- Running time: 87 minutes
- Country: Japan
- Language: Japanese

Bodyguard Kiba (Japanese: ボディガード牙, Hepburn: Bodigaado Kiba) is a 1973 Japanese martial arts film starring Sonny Chiba. It is based on an action manga by Ikki Kajiwara.

A recut version was released in the United States in 1976 by Terry Levine's Aquarius Releasing as The Bodyguard, with added footage directed by Simon Nuchtern in the first ten minutes of the film, featuring American martial arts stars Bill Louie and Aaron Banks.

Bodyguard Kiba was followed by the sequel Bodigaado Kiba: Hissatsu sankaku tobi, released later that same year. There were then three more film adaptations directed by Takashi Miike at the beginning of his career with Takeshi Yamato in the role of Kiba released in 1993, 1994, and 1995.

== Plot summary ==
On his way home to Japan, karate master Kiba thwarts a terrorist attack on the airplane. He then gives a press conference, stating he saw the attack as a good opportunity to promote his karate school and announces that he's starting a bodyguard service. He is soon approached by his first customer, a woman who pays him for four days of protection but is secretive about the nature of the threat against herself. Kiba finds himself wrapped up in the international drug trade and has to fight the mafia.

== Cast ==
- Shin'ichi Chiba as Naoto Kiba (as Sonny Chiba)
- Mari Atsumi as Reiko Miwa
- Kinji Takinami as Shigeru Kumazawa
- Yayoi Watanabe as Maki Kasuga
- Mas Oyama as Tetsugen Daito (as Masutatsu Oyama)
- Takashi Hio as Alkaid Hoshino
- Akira Kuji as Merak
- Ryōjirō Nishimoto as Phecda
- Toshiyuki Tsuchiyama as Alioth
- Hajime Kubo as Ayuta
- Hiroshi Date as Ishimochi
- Hideo Murota as Hijacker A
- Tadashi Takatsuki as Hijacker B (as Chū Takatsuki)
- Hisao Mizoguchi as Hijacker C
- Hatsue Tonooka as Stripper

== Reception ==
In a review of the American version of the film, The Bodyguard, reviewer Calvin McMillin of lovehkfilm.com wrote, "The Bodyguard doesn't exactly achieve the same dizzying, grindhouse-style heights as Chiba's Street Fighter series, but it does make for a passably entertaining time killer. As usual, Sonny Chiba makes the best of it. His magnetic screen presence is obvious, despite the fact that spends the majority of the picture dressed like the world's stuffiest English professor."

A review of the American version of the film on missiletest.com concludes, "It's a showcase of trash cinema from overseas, and how cheap distributors package material for an American audience that knows just about nothing of the world beyond the oceans. It will scratch a viewer's shitty movie itch, then fade away into the obscure recesses of memory, unworthy of more permanent retention. But, for a little under an hour and a half, one gets to watch Sonny Chiba at his most Chiba-ist."

Reviewing the home release of the original Japanese versions of Bodyguard Kiba and Bodyguard Kiba 2, reviewer Ben Jones of thegeekshow.co.uk wrote, "Sonny Chiba shines through every scene, oozing cool and menace everywhere he goes. The guys want to be him and the ladies want to be with him, and who can blame them, because he has it all. And that's the thing with these movies, they aren't great art, but they don't have to be, because when you have such a characteristic lead, everything else becomes secondary."

== Home media ==
On November 20, 2007, BCI Eclipse released the US version of the film in their Sonny Chiba Collection DVD set, which also includes Golgo 13: Assignment Kowloon, The Bullet Train, Dragon Princess, Karate Warriors, and Sister Street Fighter.

On November 15th, 2022, Shout! Studios released the original Japanese version as part of their first Sonny Chiba Collection BluRay set, which also includes the sequel Bodyguard Kiba 2, Yakuza Wolf: I Perform Miracles, Yakuza Wolf 2: Extend My Condolences, Shogun's Shadow, Samurai Reincarnation, and Swords of Vengeance.

On March 18, 2024, Eureka released the film and its sequel as Bodyguard Kiba 1 & 2 on a 2-disc Blu-ray. The extras include "The Bodyguard – alternate US version of Bodyguard Kiba", a composite intercutting Standard Definition footage from the US version with HD footage of the Japanese original, married to the English dub track.

== Sequel ==
Director Ryuichi Takamori released a sequel, Bodigaado Kiba: Hissatsu sankaku tobi, on October 13, 1973. The sequel also starred Sonny Chiba as Kiba Naoto.

== In popular culture ==
The American version of the film opens with a quotation:

The path of the righteous man and defender is beset on all sides by the iniquity of the selfish and the tyranny of evil men. Blessed is he, who in the name of charity and good will, shepherds the weak through the valley of darkness, for he is truly his brother's keeper, and the father of lost children. And I will execute great vengeance upon them with furious anger, who poison and destroy my brothers; and they shall know that I am CHIBA the BODYGUARD when I shall lay my vengeance upon them.

— Ezekiel 25:17

An altered version of the same passage (substituting "Chiba the bodyguard" with "the Lord"), complete with erroneous attribution to Ezekiel by the character of Jules Winnfield (Samuel L. Jackson), appears in Quentin Tarantino's 1994 film Pulp Fiction.

The passage was quoted with some alterations by Pete Hegseth during a monthly worship service at the Pentagon on April 16, 2026.

== Bibliography ==
- Thomas, Brian (2003). VideoHound's Dragon: Asian Action & Cult Flicks. Canton, Mich.: Visible Ink Press. ISBN 1-57859-141-4.
- Conard, Mark T. (2006). "Symbolism, Meaning, and Nihilism in Pulp Fiction". The Philosophy of Film Noir. Lexington: University Press of Kentucky. ISBN 0-8131-2377-1.
