= Koichi Ose =

Japanese actor

Koichi Ose (大瀬 康一, Ōse Kōichi; born October 27, 1937), born as Kazunari Ōse (大瀬 一靉, Ōse Kazunari), is a Japanese actor famous for his lead role as samurai swordsman Akikusa Shintaro in The Samurai (TV series). This series made a huge impact when shown in Australia in 1965. He worked in television from 1958 to 1972, after which he became a businessman. He also became skilled in Iaido, the art of swift sword drawing.

== Life ==
Born in Yokohama, Ose's real name was Kazunari Ose. He graduated from Keio University School of Foreign Languages. In 1952 he joined the Daiei Motion Picture Company (who made Rashomon and Zatoichi among others) and appeared in a number of films.

== Career ==
Ose's career began in 1958 when he starred as the hero in the tokusatsu TV series Gekko Kamen (Moonlight Mask), before landing the leading role as Shintaro in The Samurai.

Ose got the part of Gekko Kamen when producer Shunichi Nishimura went to the Toei movie lot and picked him from some photographs, then interviewed him on the spot. At the time there were three candidates for the part, but the actor needed to have clear cut features which would be easy to draw so Ose was chosen.

Through Gekko Kamen, Ose gained popularity with children as the mysterious masked hero despite the fact his face was hidden by a mask and his identity kept secret to preserve the mystery. It made a star of Ose and its two theme songs became big hits. He took one character from creator Yasunori Kawauchi's given name and incorporated it in his stage name in recognition of the boost to his career this role gave him. Made by Senkosha Productions it was directed by Funatoko Sadao. Funatoko next directed him in Jaga no me (Eye of the Jaguar) which proved to be another success before his famous role in The Samurai TV series. At the height of his television career he left The Samurai for a film contract. He was replaced by a new star Shinichiro Hayashi who appeared in the new series titled The New Samurai. It was filmed in color, but the dubbed prints were black and white.

After The Samurai, Ose acted in about 20 feature films including some period pieces and gangster films, until his sudden retirement in 1969.

Ose was also a recording artist. One of the singles released in English was called Lonely Night.

== Australian tour ==
The Samurai was the first Japanese produced series shown on Australian television and the Australian press gushed about Ose as Shintaro. Ose toured Australia in December 1965 and appeared in 12 live 90-minute shows in 15 days at the Sydney Stadium and at Festival Hall in Melbourne before returning to Japan. Originally only the Sydney shows were booked, but pressure from Melbourne promoters changed his program. Each show drew more than 6,000 people watching him slay dragons and fight ninjas in performance.

Ose first saw the extent of his popularity when he was mobbed at airports in both Sydney and Melbourne by fans wearing homemade kimono, brandishing ninja stars fashioned from cardboard or tin can lids, and waving samurai bubble gum wrappers with his picture on them.

== Personal life ==
Ose retired from acting in 1969 and from 1971 he concentrated on managing an acting agency until 1977 when he finally left show business altogether. He ran a promotion and property development company that included a golf course and a chain of noodle shops called "Goninbayashi" (five musical).

Ose married award-winning actress, Hizuru Takachiho in April 1964. Born in Kobe, Japan in 1932, Takachiho appeared in 26 films from 1951 until 1969. She won awards for Zero no shoten (Zero Focus) and Haitoku no mesu in 1962. They have one son, Yasuhiro, born in October 1965. Ose had his share of accidents, falling and injuring himself during some swordplay at a theatre. He lives in Tokyo and is an expert in Iaido. He is 5 ft 7 in (1.70 m) tall.

== Major TV roles ==
- Moonlight Mask (1958–1959)
- The Samurai (1962–1965)
- Eye of the Jaguar (1959)
