= Messenger of Allah (TV series) =

Television series

- Title card for Messenger of Allah
- Genre: Tokusatsu
- Created by: Yasunori Kawauchi
- Written by: Yoshinari Matsubara
- Directed by: Ryutaro Kondo
- Starring: Shin'ichi Chiba
- Theme music composer: George M. Reed
- Opening theme: Messenger of Allah (アラーの使者, Arā no Shisha), written by Yasunori Kawauchi, sung by Toshiba Children's Chorus
- Ending theme: Te no Hira ni Nani wa Naku Tomo (手のひらに何はなくとも), written by Yasunori Kawauchi, sung by Yuji Mine
- Composer: Nishiyama Noburo
- Country of origin: Japan
- Original language: Japanese
- No. of seasons: 1
- No. of episodes: 26

Production
- Running time: 30 minutes

Original release
- Network: NET
- Release: July 7 – December 27, 1960

Messenger of Allah, known in Japan as Allah no Shisha, (Note: Japanese: アラーの使者, Hepburn: Arā no Shisha; lit. "Messenger of Allah") is a Japanese tokusatsu superhero TV series produced by Toei Company starring a young Sonny Chiba, at the time known as Shin'ichi Chiba. It was created by writer Yasunori Kawauchi, who was also responsible for creating Moonlight Mask and Seven Color Mask. The series ran from July 7, 1960 to December 27, 1960 on NET (now TV Asahi) for a total of 26 episodes.

== Development ==
After New Seven Color Mask ended its run, Shin'ichi Chiba continued on to star in Yasunori Kawauchi's swashbuckler adventure Messenger of Allah. The series was inspired by creator Kawauchi's conversion to Islam in 1959.

The title character was the basis for Warrior of Love Rainbowman, which Kawauchi also created and wrote for, and also aired on NET. The film for the first episode is all that exists, which can be found on the Toei Tokusatsu BB website. Messenger of Allah was sponsored by the Kabaya Foods Corporation. The Kabayan Kingdom, His Imperial Highness Coconut and Mammy were named after the sponsor's products "Kabaya Caramel Coconut" and the "Mammy" brand bisquits from Morinaga & Company.

== Story ==
The setting takes place in the fictional Kabayan Kingdom (カバヤン王国, Kabayan Ōkoku) in the Middle East. His Imperial Highness Coconut, the heir to the throne, and his sister Mammy are searching for hidden treasure, guided by a map. When Coconut and Mammy are attacked by the Crimson Lizard Gang (紅蜥蜴団, Kurenai Tokage-dan), the white turban-wearing ally of justice, known as the "Messenger of Allah", appears. The Messenger of Allah's secret identity is Goro Narumi, a private investigator.

== Cast ==
- Shin'ichi Chiba: Goro Narumi/Messenger of Allah (鳴海五郎 (なるみ ごろう)/アラーの使者, Narumi Goro/Arā no Shisha)
- Kaneko Akio: His Imperial Highness Coconut (ココナツ殿下, Kokonatsu Denka), successor of the Kabayan Kingdom.
- Yumi Ichijo: Mammy (マミイ, Mamii), Coconut's sister.
- Hitoshi Ohmae: Dr. Ijuin (伊集院博士, Ijuin Hakase)
- Junorio Kozuka: Dr. Ueda (上田博士, Ueda Hakase)
- Arima Shinji: Dr. Yamamura (山村博士, Yamamura Hakase)
- Etsuko Sakurai: Chikako Ueda (上田睦子, Ueda Chikako)
- Koji Matsuyama: Tamaran (タマラン, Tamaran)

== Episode list ==
1. Fear of the Crimson Lizard (恐怖の紅とかげ)
2. A Formidable Enemy May Come (襲いくる強敵)
3. Whispers of the Devil (悪魔の囁き)
4. An Invitation to Hell (地獄への招待状)
5. A Formidable Trap (恐るべき罠)
6. A Conspiracy Is Cowardly (卑怯なる陰謀)
7. Curse of the Ghost (幽鬼の呪い)
8. House of the Long Shadow of Horror (戦慄の魔人館)
9. Village of the Damned In Darkness (闇に光る眼)
10. A Bizarre Mystery (奇怪なる謎)
11. The Bald Mask (その仮面を剥げ)
12. Challenge of the Savage Tribe (蕃族の挑戦)
13. Victory Song of the Desert (砂漠の凱歌)
14. The Vampire's Challenge (吸血鬼の挑戦)
15. New Clutches (新たなる魔手)
16. A Formidable Third Enemy (第三の強敵)
17. A Great Mystery (大いなる謎)
18. An Endless Mystery (果てしなき謎)
19. The Thin Man (影なき男)
20. The Devil's Challenge (悪魔の挑戦)
21. Hell's Curse (地獄の呪い)
22. A Formidable Ploy (恐るべき策略)
23. Ghost Den (幽鬼の巣窟)
24. The Monster's Loud Laughter (妖魔の哄笑)
25. A Trap Is Cowardly (卑怯なる罠)
26. The Great Mask of Horror (戦慄の大仮面)

== Staff ==
- Director: Ryutaro Kondo
- Planning: Masamichi Sato, Seishi Matsumaru
- Creator: Yasunori Kawauchi
- Screenplay: Yoshinari Matsubara
- Cinematography: Shigetaro Shiota
- Fine Art: Sei'ichi Toriizuka
- Music: Nishiyama Noboru

== Theme song ==
Opening: "Messenger of Allah" (アラーの使者, Arā no Shisha)

- Lyrics: Yasunori Kawauchi
- Composer: George M. Reed
- Song: Toshiba Children's Chorus

Ending: "Te no Hira ni Nani wa Naku Tomo" (手のひらに何はなくとも)

- Lyrics: Yasunori Kawauchi
- Composer: George M. Reed
- Song: Yuji Mine

== Manga ==
The manga version by Ippei Kuri was serialized in Bōken Ō magazine, and the tankōbon was published in 2010.

== Bibliography ==
- Takeshobo/Ion-Hen, ed. (1995-11-30). 超人画報 国産架空ヒーロー40年の歩み (Chōjin Gahō Kokusan Kakū Hīrō 40-nen no Ayumi). Takeshobo. ISBN 4-88475-874-9. C0076.
