= Ninja Akakage =

Japanese manga by Mitsuteru Yokoyama and its media franchise

- Cover of the first manga volume.

仮面の忍者 赤影 (Kamen no Ninja Akakage)
- Manga
- Written by: Mitsuteru Yokoyama
- Published by: Shogakukan
- Magazine: Weekly Shōnen Sunday
- Original run: 1966 – 1967
- Volumes: 3
- Television drama
- Produced by: Tetsuo Kato (KTV); Toru Hirayama (Toei); Masao Takada (Toei Kyoto TV Production)
- Written by: Masaru Igami
- Music by: Hirōki Ogawa
- Studio: Kansai Telecasting Corporation; Toei Company, Ltd.
- Original network: KTV, Fuji TV
- Original run: April 5, 1967 – March 27, 1968
- Episodes: 52
Further information
Live-action film
Tobidasu Bouken Eiga: Akakage
Directed by	Junji Kurata
Written by	Masaru Igami
Music by	Hirooki Ogawa
Studio	Toei Company
Released	July 20, 1969
Runtime	52 minutes
Manga
Shin Kamen no Ninja Akakage
Written by	Mitsuteru Yokoyama
Published by	Akita Shoten
Imprint	Shonen Champion Comics
Magazine	Weekly Shonen Champion
Original run	September 18, 1987 – April 15, 1988
Volumes	3
Anime television series
Directed by	Susumu Ishizaki
Produced by	Keizô Shichijô (Toei Animation); Hidehiko Takei (NTV); Kyotaro Kimura (Yomiko)
Written by	Toshiki Inoue; Yoshiyuki Suga
Music by	Shunsuke Kikuchi
Studio	Toei Animation
Original network	NNS (NTV)
Original run	13 October 1987 – 22 March 1988
Episodes	23
Video game
Developer	Shouei
Publisher	Toei Animation
Genre	Action
Platform	Famicom
Released	May 20, 1988
Manga
Kamen no Ninja Akakage Remains
Written by	Masaomi Kanzaki
Published by	Akita Shoten
Imprint	Play Comic Series
Magazine	Play Comic
Original run	May 25, 2012 – May 25, 2014
Volumes	4
Drama television series
Masked Ninja Akakage
Live-action film
Red Shadow: Akakage

Ninja Akakage (仮面の忍者 赤影, Kamen no Ninja Akakage; "Masked Ninja Red Shadow") is a Japanese manga series written and Illustrated by Mitsuteru Yokoyama. It was originally serialized in Shogakukan's shōnen manga magazine Weekly Shōnen Sunday from 1966 to 1967.

The manga was adapted into a 52-episode tokusatsu series by Toei and was broadcast on Kansai TV and Fuji TV from April 1967 to March 1968, followed by a film adaptation in 1969. A 26-episode anime adaptation by Toei Animation was broadcast on Nippon TV from October 1987 to March 1988. A second live-action film titled Red Shadow, which serves as a loose adaptation, was released in 2001.

== Plot ==
The story is set in the late sixteenth century when Japan was in the midst of a long period of civil wars. While some seek to unite Japan in order to bring peace, there are others who encourage conflict in order to bring more power to themselves. Akakage, Aokage, and Shirokage are all good ninjas working for those who seek peace and unity across Japan. The ninjas use their superhuman fighting powers and high-tech gadgets to battle against evil warlords and their daikaiju (giant monsters).

== Characters ==
=== Akakage ===
Portrayed by: Yuzaburo Sakaguchi (1967 TV series and 1969 film), Masanobu Ando (Red Shadow)

Voiced by: Toshio Furukawa (1987 anime)

Akakage (赤影; "Red Shadow") is a ninja who wears a red-and-black costume and a stylized red mask. He is the best swordsman of the three and a master of disguise. The crystal in his mask fires an energy beam. Akakage appears on the scene proclaiming "Akakage Sanjō!"

=== Aokage ===
Portrayed by: Yoshinobu Kaneko (1967 TV series and 1969 film), Jun Murakami (Red Shadow)

Voiced by: Masako Nozawa (1987 anime)

Aokage (青影, "Blue Shadow") is a young boy who plays with explosives and uses a chain weapon.

=== Shirokage ===
Portrayed by: Fuyukichi Maki (1967 TV series and 1969 film), Naoto Takenaka (Red Shadow)

Voiced by: Tesshō Genda (1987 anime)

Shirokage (白影; "White Shadow") is an old man who is armed with a pole weapon and flies using a large kite.

== Media ==
=== 1967 Tokusatsu series ===
Kamen no Ninja Akakage (仮面の忍者 赤影, Masked Ninja Akakage), was produced by Toei Company Ltd., and aired on KTV and Fuji TV from April 5, 1967, to March 27, 1968, with a total of 52 episodes (divided into four segments). Akakage was played by Yuzaburo Sakaguchi, Aokage was played by Yoshinobu Kaneko and Shirokage was played by Fuyukichi Maki.

==== Development ====
This was Toei's first color tokusatsu superhero show and Japan's first color live-action ninja TV series. Aokage's footage from the series was used to create several Watari films with the titles like Watari the Conqueror (not to be confused with the unrelated 1966 film Watari, Ninja Boy).

=== 1987 anime series ===
Cover art of the DVD box for the 1987 Kamen no Ninja Akakage anime.

Kamen no Ninja Akakage (仮面の忍者赤影, Masked Ninja Akakage) is the anime adaptation produced by Toei that aired on Nippon Television from October 13, 1987, to March 22, 1988, with a total of 23 episodes. The complete series was released on DVD by Toei Video on June 10, 2015.

==== Video game ====
A video game was created based on the anime version. It was released in 1988, by Toei, for the Family Computer. The game music was composed by J-Walk.

Famicom title screen

=== 2001 live-action film ===
Red Shadow (RED SHADOW 赤影, Reddo Shadō Akakage) is a loose adaptation of the original Kamen no Ninja Akakage series. It was released in 2001 and was directed by Hiroyuki Nakano. It stars Masanobu Andō in the title role. The story, characters, and their costumes were, however, re-designed from scratch.

=== 2025 drama television series ===
Another live-action television adaptation titled in English as Masked Ninja Akakage was announced on September 7, 2025, this time being a drama adaptation. Co-produced by TV Asahi and Toei, the series was directed by Takashi Miike, who also handles chief direction, and is written by Yusuke Watanabe with general production by OLM and Toei Studios Kyoto. The series began airing on TV Asahi and its affiliates at 12:10 AM on Monday, October 27, 2025, following the Sunday night programming. The opening theme is titled "Swish Dat", performed by Psychic Fever from Exile Tribe.
