= Sailor Moon (disambiguation) =

Sailor Moon is a Japanese media franchise beginning with the Sailor Moon manga series (1991–1997) by Naoko Takeuchi.

Sailor Moon may also refer to:

== Sailor Moon franchise ==
=== Characters ===
- Sailor Moon (character), the main character in Sailor Moon media

=== Adaptations ===
- Sailor Moon (TV series), a 1992–1997 anime based on the manga
- Sailor Moon Crystal, a 2014 original net animation reboot of the Sailor Moon franchise
- Sailor Moon Eternal, a 2021 two-part film continuation of the Sailor Moon Crystal series
- Sailor Moon Cosmos, a 2023 two-part film finale of the Sailor Moon Crystal series
- Pretty Guardian Sailor Moon (2003 TV series), a 2003–2004 live-action television show
- Sailor Moon musicals, the stage musicals, also known as SeraMyu
- List of Sailor Moon video games, video games based on the series
  - Sailor Moon, a 1993 SNES video game
  - Pretty Soldier Sailor Moon (arcade game), a 1995 arcade video game
- Sailor Moon Collectible Card Game, a card game released in North America
- Sailor Moon (1994 TV pilot), an unaired pilot
