= Bat-Manga!: The Secret History of Batman in Japan =

Book by Jiro Kuwata

- Cover of softcover Bat-Manga!, early design.
- Author: Jiro Kuwata (manga)
- Translator: Manga: Anne Ishii; Manhua: Lily Chow; Lu Chen; Xiaoru Chen
- Illustrator: Jiro Kuwata; Toshio Okazaki; Takashi Minaomuru
- Cover artist: Gojin Ishihara (softcover); Jiro Kuwata (hardcover)
- Language: English
- Series: Bat-Manga!
- Subject: Batman phenomena in Japan
- Genre: History
- Publisher: Pantheon Books
- Publication date: October 28, 2008
- Publication place: Japan; United States
- Media type: graphic novel
- Pages: 352 (softcover); 384 (hardcover)
- ISBN: 978-0-375-71484-9
- OCLC: 192080568
- LC Class: PN6790.J33 K8913 2008

Bat-Manga!: The Secret History of Batman in Japan is a 2008 book published by Pantheon Books, subsidiary of Random House, in the United States. The book was designed by Chip Kidd, the content was sourced from Saul Ferris' extensive collection of Japanese Batman manga, toys and ephemera, which was photographed by frequent collaborator Geoff Spear. It collects a Japanese shōnen manga adaptation of the American comic book series Batman by Jiro Kuwata simply entitled Batman (バットマン, Battoman) and also includes photographs of vintage Batman toys from Japan. The Batman manga included in Bat-Manga! was created during a Batman craze in Japan, being serialized from April 1966 to May 1967; the series ended when the craze ended. The manga was released in paperback and at the same time a limited hardcover was released on October 28, 2008, with an additional manhua bootleg and an extra Batman story by the creator. On October 28, 2013, the entire 53 chapter run of the series was released in Japan as a three volume-box set.

In July 2014, DC Comics started to release the entire Japanese Batman manga in English through ComiXology as a Digital First series The Jiro Kuwata Batmanga, with a new chapter going online each week. The digital run will be followed by a complete three-volume release in both print and digital form some time during or after the run.

== Background ==
In 1966, the Batman TV series starring Adam West prompted a Batman craze in Japan. In response to this, the shōnen magazine Shōnen King and its publisher Shōnen Gahōsha licensed the rights to make their own Batman stories, with the full consent of the original Batman publisher, DC Comics. In 1997, the stories stopped and were never compiled into volume format.

David Mazzuchelli, creator of Batman: Year One, became aware of "Batman" manga's existence when he went to Japan for a cartoonists convention in the early 1990s. The Japanese told him about a manga adaptation of Batman, information he later passed along to his good friend, premiere designer and novelist Chip Kidd. Chip Kidd had been a serious fan of Batman ever since the age of two. When the TV series came out in the US, Chip stayed loyal to the series even while his friends started watching Happy Days.

Chip Kidd met Batman collector Saul Ferris through eBay when Kidd was bidding on what he thought was a rare, mint Japanese Batmobile toy. Ferris emailed Kidd that Batman's original tin head had been extracted from the Batmobile and replaced with a cheap imitation, rendering the toy virtually worthless. Shortly afterward, Chip Kidd and Saul Ferris became friends. Ferris has an extensive collection of non-U.S. Batman comics, including Japanese comics. Once Kidd saw the extensive amount of Batman Japanese manga and toys in Ferris' collection, Kidd put together a book proposal to DC Comics. Paul Levitz, then head of DC Comics, who is likely the most knowledgeable person in the world regarding DC publications, was not aware the Japanese published a series of unique Batman stories in 1966 and 1967. The Bat-Manga! project was given the green light with Mr. Levitz' blessing. The Batman manga was released in English in the book Bat-Manga!: The Secret History of Batman in Japan. Chip Kidd designed the book while Geoff Spear photographed Saul Ferris' collection of toys and Batman manga stories. Anne Ishii and Chip Kidd translated the Japanese into English. DC Comics' archives contained none of the manga stories and unfortunately, Ferris' collection had holes in the run so not all the stories could be published in their entirety.

== Media ==
Bat-Manga! was released in English, trade paperback on October 28, 2008 (ISBN 978-0-375-71484-9) with an exclusive interview with the creator of the original manga, Jiro Kuwata and pictures of vintage Batman toys. A limited edition hardcover (ISBN 978-0-375-42545-5) was released at the same time with a distinctly different cover, expanded, and with an additional extra short-story by Jiro Kuwata, and the Bat-Manhua (Chinese: 神之洲菲 蝠蝙黑 俠飛 (Note: Written in Chinese, traditionally spelled from right to left and read in the same direction. The title spelled more modern is 飛俠 黑蝙蝠 菲洲之神.) Fēixiá Hēibiānfú Fēizhōu zhī Shén, lit. "Batman: The God of Africa"), a Chinese manhua bootleg. Only 7,000 hardcover issues were released, with additional bookplates signed by him and Jiro Kuwata. At Rocketship, a comic store in Brooklyn, New York, Chip Kidd gave out exclusive bookplates to people who got their manga signed at the event. New drawings of Bat-Manga! were found in archive issues of Shōnen King, and Chip Kidd mentioned the long-hinted sequel Bat-Manga 2.

== Reception ==
Bat-Manga! got generally positive reviews from critics. About.com's Deb Aoki lists Bat-Manga! as the best "new edition of classic manga" of 2008. The manga got a 4 out of 5 star review from Deb Aoki of About.com. "At a time when superhero comics are dark and grim, reading Bat-Manga is a blast from a simpler past, when comics were largely created for and read by kids" said Deb, "These stories from the '60s lack complex character development, detailed artwork and snappy dialogue that contemporary fans expect from comics, but they do feature dynamic action scenes, crisp art and unusual interpretations of the Batman mythos that are infectiously fun to read". Deb went one, "On the upside, it's delightful to see Kuwata's artwork presented with such class and style, and to read an interview with the now 70-something year old manga master". Reviever Ted Anthony of Associated Press said, "That blending is what infuses such fascination into "Bat-Manga!"—designer Kidd's gorgeous examination of the odd collision between American comic-book superheroes and Japanese manga that took place in Japan in 1966 and 1967, the heyday of the Batman-as-high-camp period in the United States" Ted described the series as if someone threw some DC Comics issues, a few Godzilla sequels and some "Speed Racer" episodes into a blender. "Granted, $60 is a high price for a glorified comic book, particularly in the current economy," said Ted however he stated that it's more than a simple comic book, it's more of a cultural document. Frank Santoro of Publishers Weekly also gave Bat-Manga! a positive review. Frank Santoro admired the yellow paper and purple ink, restoring the pages of how a Japanese kid would read it long ago. "Drawn in this golden sunshine (okay, purple) of mid-'60s classic Japanese manga, these stories capture the feeling of being a kid on Saturday morning." Bat-Manga! had an estimated rank of 180 on ComiPress's "Top 300 Series of 2008", with Naruto at #1.

Meltdown Comics, a comic book store which promoted the book itself, gave Bat-Manga! a positive review.

It has also been raised as an issue that Chip Kidd got all the credit for Bat-Manga! instead of Jiro Kuwata. Chip Kidd responded to these claims, "First, Bat-Manga is not just about the work of Mr. Kuwata, although that of course makes up the bulk of the book. Rather, it is about chronicling the phenomenon, however short-lived, of Batman in Japan in 1966" Nisha Gopalan of Los Angeles Times, considered this debatable, "it should also be noted that "Bat-Manga!" feels like a radical packaging of Kuwata's work and that the creator is interviewed and given multiple credits within its pages"

== In other media ==
The first issue of Grant Morrison's Batman Inc. series features several references to the Batman manga. Most notable among them are the inclusion of Lord Death Man, a character who appeared in the manga after initially appearing in a US Batman comic book in 1966 as simply "Death Man"; and a character named Jiro Osamu, who is likely named after artists Jiro Kawata and Osamu Tezuka.

A story inspired by the Batman manga appeared in Batman: The Brave and the Bold episode "Bat-Mite Presents: Batman's Strangest Cases!", with Chip Kidd and Saul Ferris working alongside the show's creators to produce the segment. Ferris provided digital images from his Batman toy collection which were incorporated in Bat-Mite's introductory segments (voiced by Paul Reubens of Pee-wee Herman fame). During the episode, Batman and Robin fight against Lord Death Man, a foe present in the comic.
