= Iron King =

- Title card
- Genre: Superhero; Tokusatsu; Kaiju; Kyodai Hero
- Created by: Mamoru Sasaki
- Directed by: Noriaki Yuasa
- Starring: Shōji Ishibashi; Mitsuo Hamada
- Country of origin: Japan
- No. of episodes: 26

Production
- Running time: 24 minutes (per episode)
- Production companies: Senkosha Productions; Nippon Gendai Kikaku

Original release
- Network: TBS
- Release: October 8, 1972 – April 8, 1973

Iron King (アイアンキング, Aian Kingu) is a tokusatsu superhero TV series about a giant cyborg. The series was produced by Nippon Gendai and Senkosha (now Senko Planning), and aired on Tokyo Broadcasting System from October 8, 1972, to April 8, 1973, with a total of 26 episodes.

== Plot description ==
The Shiranui Clan have planned for 2000 years to conquer Japan in retaliation for their nomadic ancestors being banished from the country by the Yamato Clan (who eventually became known as the Japanese people). Each armored ninja-like member of the clan controls a gigantic robot warrior in order to overthrow the "Yamato Government," as they call it.

In response to this terrorist threat, Japan's National Security Organization send agent Gentaro Shizuka (Shoji Ishibashi), disguised as what can best described as a Spaghetti Western version of a singing cowboy, to stop their plans with the assistance of comical, mountaineering-clad Goro Kirishima (Mitsuo Hamada). In an unusual direction for such tokusatsu (visual effects) programs, it is not the heroic but often surprisingly ruthless Gentaro, but the bumbling, bespectacled Goro, who has the power to become the giant cybernetic superhero Iron King by touching the medals on the sides of his funny red Turning Hat and yelling "Iron Shock!" when danger threatens.

However, often Iron King is unable to defeat the clan's giant robots without help from Gentaro, who wields a weapon called the Iron Belt that can become a slender rapier-like sword or an infinitely extendable metal whip capable of hurting giant monsters. In addition, transforming into the hydrogen oxide-powered Iron King quickly dehydrates Goro, and he can only remain as Iron King for a short period of time. Strangely, although Gentaro knows Iron King's time limit comes from exhausting his water supply he never manages to connect it with Goro's omnipresent thirst until the final episode.

In the tenth episode the Shiranui Clan is wiped out, but their place is taken by the skull-symboled keffiyeh-clad Phantom Militia (A/K/A the Phantom Opposition Party) who to enact their revolution against the Japanese government, use monsters. Their monsters initially appear to be traditional kaiju, though they are revealed to all be robots, commanded by agents of the Militia remotely.

And from the nineteenth episode to the end of the series, Gentaro and Goro battle black cloak and Puritan hat-clad white-masked aliens called Titanians, who despite looking human, have various inhuman powers such as flight, body-possessing mind control, and the ability to enlarge themselves to giant size. Upon doing the latter they are then able to assume insect-like monster forms.

== Episode list ==
#	Title	Guest cast	Director	First aired	Monster appeared
1.	Secret Messenger of the Morning Wind 朝風の密使	Shinzo Hotta; Kiro Abe; Fudeko Tanaka; Kinji Takinami; Hiroshi Ikaida	Shozo Tamura	1972-10-08	Vacumira
2.	The Swan in the Ruins 廃墟の白鳥	Shinzo Hotta; Hiroshi Ikaida	Shozo Tamura	1972-10-15	Jairogesu
3.	The Warrior's Smile 戦士の微笑	Shinzo Hotta; Hiroshi Ikaida	Shozo Tamura	1972-10-22	Double Satan
4.	Gentaro Travels Alone 弦太郎孤独旅	Shinzo Hotta; Yosuke Akimoto	Toru Sotoyama	1972-10-29	Devil Tiger
5.	The Duel in the Autumn Wind 秋風の中の決斗	Shinzo Hotta; Shogo Hanagi	Toru Sotoyama	1972-11-05	Black Knight, Bronze Demon, Monster Bird
6.	Lullaby for a Warrior 戦士の子守唄	Shinzo Hotta; Seishiro Kuno; Masayuki Tobuyo	Shozo Tamura; Kiyoshi Suzuki	1972-11-12	Monster Bird
7.	Those That Fly the Skies 大空を征く者	Shinzo Hotta; Kaori Seki; Hisashi Kato	Shozo Tamura; Kiyoshi Suzuki	1972-11-19	Silver Rider
8.	The Shadow Area 影の地帯	Shinzo Hotta; Mitsuko Hoshi; Yoshinori Furukawa; Shinobu Miura	Noriaki Yuasa; Kiyoshi Suzuki	1972-11-26	Gold Fire
9.	Gentaro in a Close Shave 弦太郎危機一髪!	Shinzo Hotta; Yuki Okazaki	Toru Sotoyama; Koichi Takano	1972-12-03	Gold Fire
10.	A Kiss for the Dead 死者へのくちづけ	Katsumi Muramatsu; Shima Mizue; Kiyoshi Tokugawa; Gin Minemura	Hiroshi Fukuhara	1972-12-10	Gold Fire, Zaira Unicorn
11.	Tokyo Is Burning 東京は燃えている	Katsumi Muramatsu; Kiyoshi Tokugawa; Gin Minemura	Toru Sotoyama	1972-12-17	Zaira Unicorn
12.	State of Emergency in Tokyo 東京非常事態宣言	Katsumi Muramatsu; Teresa Noda; Junko Natsu; Wataru Mitsui; Ikuo Kosaka	Toru Sotoyama	1972-12-24	Tongazaurus
13.	Attacking the Underground Fortress 地下要塞攻撃命令	Katsumi Muramatsu; Junko Natsu; Wataru Mitsui; Isamu Matsuzawa	Toru Sotoyama	1972-12-31	Tongazaurus
14.	Secret of the Brainwave Robot 脳波ロボットの秘密	Katsumi Muramatsu; Hijiri Matsuki; Teppei Takasugi; Kazuo Arai	Hiromu Edagawa	1973-01-14	Jurass-Don
15.	Marathon Monster Capri-Gon マラソン怪獣カプリゴン	Katsumi Muramatsu; Masahiro Takashina; Harue Kyo	Hiromu Edagawa	1973-01-21	Capri-Gon
16.	Destroy Tora-Girasu! トラギラスを倒せ!	Katsumi Muramatsu; Yumi Mizusawa	Hiroshi Fukuhara	1973-01-28	Tora-Girasu
17.	The Order to Assassinate Iron King アイアンキング殺害命令	Katsumi Muramatsu; Chidori Tashiro; Koetsu Omiya	Toru Sotoyama	1973-02-04	Dodzilla, Kumagross
18.	Monster Robot Annihilation ロボット怪獣全滅作戦	Katsumi Muramatsu; Eiko Ogawa	Toru Sotoyama	1973-02-11	Kumagross
19.	The Giant Bug Kabutoron Appears 大虫人カブトロン出現	Chiaki Ukyo; Hajime Izu	Hiroshi Fukuhara; Koichi Takano	1973-02-18	Kabutoron
20.	The Titanians Strike Back 宇虫人タイタニアンの逆襲	Chiaki Ukyo	Hiroshi Fukuhara; Koichi Takano	1973-02-25	Kabutoron
21.	Kamagyrus Wants Lethal Gas! カマギュラス殺人ガスを狙う	Chiaki Ukyo; Mari Sakurai; Tetsuya Sano	Toru Sotoyama	1973-03-04	Kamagyrus
22.	Terrifying Titanian Underworld 恐怖のタイタニアン地獄	Chiaki Ukyo; Fumio Ikeda	Toru Sotoyama	1973-03-11	Kirigirin
23.	The Insect Humanoid Masquerades as a Woman 女に化けた虫人	Chiaki Ukyo; Ryoko Sakaguchi; Hideo Saito	Shozo Tamura	1973-03-18	Kangarole
24.	Tokyo Assault Frontline Base 東京攻撃前線基地	Chiaki Ukyo; Yoku Shioya	Hiroshi Fukuhara	1973-03-25	Cockroachaur
25.	Iron King in a Panic! アイアンキング大ピンチ!	Chiaki Ukyo	Toru Sotoyama	1973-04-01	Cricketton, Possessed Iron King
26.	The Great Tokyo War 東京大戦争	Chiaki Ukyo; Hajime Izu	Toru Sotoyama	1973-04-08	Cricketton, Possessed Iron King

== DVD releases ==
Cover to the 2007 DVD release

On November 6, 2007, BCI Eclipse Entertainment Company LLC released the complete series of Iron King on DVD in Region 1. As of 2009, this release is now out of print as BCI Eclipse ceased operations.

On March 9, 2010, Mill Creek Entertainment re-released the entire series on DVD in Region 1.
