= Legend of Dinosaurs & Monster Birds =

- Theatrical release poster
- Directed by: Junji Kurata
- Screenplay by: Masaru Igami; Isao Matsumoto; Ichirô Ôtsu
- Starring: Tsunehiko Watase; Nobiko Sawa; Shotaro Hayashi
- Cinematography: Sakuji Shiomi; Shigeru Akazuka
- Edited by: Isamu Ichida
- Music by: Masao Yagi
- Production company: Toei
- Distributed by: Toei
- Release date: April 29, 1977 (Japan)
- Running time: 94 minutes
- Country: Japan
- Budget: ¥750 million ($2.8 million)
- Box office: $25 million (est.)

Legend of Dinosaurs & Monster Birds (恐竜・怪鳥の伝説, Kyōryū Kaichō no Densetsu; lit. Legend of Dinosaurs and Ominous Birds), also known in the U.S. as The "Legend of Dinosaurs", is a 1977 Japanese kaiju science fiction film produced and distributed by Toei Company. The film was initially unsuccessful in Japan, but later became an overseas blockbuster in the Soviet Union.

== Plot ==
A young woman wanders barefoot in the lush Aokigahara (青木ヶ原), also known as the Sea of Trees (樹海 Jukai) region of Mount Fuji, and suddenly falls into a cavern, awakening in an icy cave full of large eggs. When one of the eggs start to hatch, she goes into hysterics and flees until she is discovered by a construction crew. Before falling into a coma, the girl babbles about what she saw to a reporter. Her story airs on a televised news report that is seen by geologist Takashi Ashizawa. Upon hearing about the fossilized egg, Takashi sets off to Mount Fuji to find it.

When he arrives at the small village bordering Fuji's Saiko Lake, Takashi immediately heads into the heavily forested Jukai when a sudden earthquake occurs and he is knocked out. He later awakens in his father's old cabin near Saiko Lake, and discovers that he was rescued by Shohei Muku, an old friend of the family. Takashi quickly gets back to fossil-hunting and heads toward the Jukai once again. As he cruises through the nearby village, he greets two women, Junko and Akiko, a former lover of his.

Meanwhile, other bizarre things start happening around the Saiko Lake community. A young couple in a paddle boat disappear without a trace, an injured diver is pulled from the lake and livestock begin to mysteriously vanish. Takashi begins developing a theory that a dinosaur is alive and well in Saiko Lake. His theory gains credence when Junko stumbles upon a headless horse-corpse lying in the road, and Takashi later finds it lodged in a tree while taking photographs of some strange tracks in the mud.

The following day, Takashi sits in his father's cabin and develops a possible theory as to what type of creature could have killed the horse and placed the remains in a tree for safekeeping. He decides that the creature must be a living Plesiosaurus and shares his minimal proof and hypothesis with a very skeptical Shohei. His theory proves correct when a Plesiosaurus really does appear and devours some local pranksters during a festival outside.

The creature continues to subtly terrorize the community and devours two more women, including Junko, whose death is witnessed by Akiko and their pet dog. Takashi and Akiko soon discover the presence of another prehistoric beast, a giant Rhamphorhynchus, which also proceeds to menace the community. Eventually, the two prehistoric beasts come face-to-face, with the Plesiosaurus eventually gaining the upper hand against the Rhamphorhynchus, despite losing an eye. Mount Fuji then finally erupts, sending the reptiles into a fiery chasm below as the ground gives way. Akiko almost falls to her death, before Takashi is able to grab her by the hand. The film then ends, leaving the two protagonists' fates ambiguous.

== Cast ==
- Tsunehiko Watase as Takashi Ashizawa
- Shotaro Hayashi as Akira Taniki
- Nobiko Sawa as Akiko Osano
- Tomoko Kiyoshima as Junko Sonoda
- Fuyukichi Maki as Masahira Muku
- Akira Moroguchi as himself
- Kinshi Nakamura as Hideyuki Sakai
- Hiroshi Nawa as Masahiko Miyawaki
- So Takizawa as Jiro Shimamoto
- Yûsuke Tsukasa as Susumu Hirano
- Go Nawata as Hiroshi Sugiyama
- Yukari Miyamae as Hiroko Takami
- Masahiro Arikawa as Seitaro Shintaku
- Minken Karazawa as Uemura
- Sachio Miyashiro as Kobayashi
- David Freedman as Harold Tucker
- Maureen Peacock as Maureen Tucker
- Catherine Laub as Catherine Tucker

== Production ==
Inspiration for the film came from Toei’s president Shigeru Okada in 1974. After serving as head of Japanese delegations at overseas film festivals and trade fairs, he formed business relationships with executives of Western-style distribution companies. Studying the styles of Western filmmaking, he ordered a screening of Jaws at the Toei Studios. Okada determined that American film trends would gain popularity in Japan, and that Japanese filmmaking should adopt those trends. Based on the success of Jaws, he determined that similar “monster movie” films would be successful.

Production began in December 1975, the same month that Jaws was released nationwide in Japan. It also coincided with a resurgence of reports of Nessie in Loch Ness. With a view to the world market, the film was to include Mount Fuji (as a symbol of Japan) and the similar theme of a mysterious lake-dwelling monster. The script incorporated other elements of Japanese culture such as dragon legends and myths. In the spring of 1976, an early title for the screenplay was “The Giant Monster Bird vs. The Giant Dragon God" (大怪鳥対大竜神, Dai kaisho tai Dai ryujin).The final script was completed on September 3, 1976 with filming starting on October 12.

Filming ended after six months, on March 21, 1977, between locations at Toei Studios and Mount Fuji. Production costs totaled ¥750 million ($2.8 million); this included ¥150 million for special effects, ¥45 million for film equipment and ¥20 million for models/animatronics. A 24-meter pool was also built for water scenes within Toei’s Kyoto Studio.

Model work was supervised by actor/director Fuminori Ohashi, as his final studio work before retirement. Four different kinds of ¼ scale Plesiosaurus props were created, along with life-size heads and fins, over a four-month period. A ¼ scale model of the Rhamphorhynchus was also created, as were a life-size head and feet.

== Release ==
Advertising expenses for the film reached ¥100 million. Legend of Dinosaurs & Monster Birds was released in Japan on April 29, 1977. The film was never released theatrically in the United States. It was released to television by King Features Entertainment in 1987 with an English-language dub, and later featured in an early episode of Mystery Science Theater 3000.

== Box office ==
In Japan, it earned ¥240 million in distributor rentals, equivalent to an estimated 700,000 ticket sales and ¥600 million ($2 million) gross receipts. In 1977, Toei president Okada stated that, despite significant pre-sales at the Milan and Tehran International Film Festivals in October–November 1976, the film was not a significant success overseas.

It later became an overseas blockbuster in the Soviet Union upon its release there in 1979, becoming the 19th highest-grossing foreign film of all time at the Soviet box office with 48.7 million admissions, equivalent to an estimated $23 million in gross revenue. This brings its total box office admissions to an estimated 49.4 million tickets sold worldwide and its total gross revenue to an estimated $25 million worldwide (equivalent to $130 million adjusted for inflation).

== See also ==
- List of films featuring dinosaurs
- List of Japanese films of 1977
