= Masked Ninja Akakage (2025 TV series) =

2025 Japanese jidaigeki TV series by Takashi Miike

- Promotional TV Asahi poster featuring the main protagonist
- 仮面の忍者赤影
- Based on: Ninja Akakage by Mitsuteru Yokoyama
- Screenplay by: Yūsuke Watanabe (17 episodes); Mari Takura (3 episodes)
- Directed by: Takashi Miike (4 episodes, also Chief Director); Hiroki Kashiwagi (8 episodes); Ryūsuke Kurahashi (4 episodes); Katsuya Watanabe (4 episodes)
- Starring: Taiki Sato
- Narrated by: Junichi Suwabe
- Music by: Kōji Endō
- Country of origin: Japan
- Original language: Japanese
- No. of episodes: 20

Production
- Executive producer: Ikuhide Yokochi (TV Asahi)
- Producers: Moe Ouchi (TV Asahi); Takato Akiyama (TV Asahi); Kazuma Kuryu (Toei); Hiroya Ishizaki (Toei); Takishima Minami (Toei); Misako Saka (OLM)
- Running time: 24 minutes (without commercials)
- Production companies: TV Asahi; Toei Company; OLM

Original release
- Network: TV Asahi, IAT, AAB, UX, KAB
- Release: October 27, 2025 – March 30, 2026

Masked Ninja Akakage (仮面の忍者赤影, Kamen no Ninja Akakage) is a 2025-2026 Japanese jidaigeki TV series directed by Takashi Miike and starring Taiki Sato, leader of the J-pop group Fantastics from Exile Tribe, and EXILE member Takahiro Tasaki, credited as EXILE TAKAHIRO. It a live-action adaptation of the manga Ninja Akakage by Mitsuteru Yokoyama.

== Plot ==
As Oda Nobunaga is working to unify Japan, his servant Akakage, a ninja from the village of Hida, combats the evil forces of the Golden Eye cult that is thriving south of Lake Biwa and is led by Genyōsai, a man who is plotting to take control of Japan.

== Cast ==
- Taiki Sato as Akakage (赤影; "Red Shadow")
- Keito Kimura as Aokage (青影, "Blue Shadow")
- Ryō Katō as Takenaka Hanbei, a.k.a. Shirokage (白影; "White Shadow")
- Hideyuki Kasahara as Oribe Tamon
- Mitsuru Karahashi as Kurobei the Black Bat
- Aina Yamada as Yuri, a.k.a. Kurokage (黒影, "Black Shadow")
- Masaki Nakao as Ishida Mitsunari
- Atomu Mizuishi as Fukushima Masanori
- Keisuke Shiba as Katō Kiyomasa
- Keito Takahashi as Mori Ranmaru
- Tokio Emoto as Hashiba Hideyoshi
- Shūgo Oshinari as Takigawa Kazumasu
- Unknown actor as Genyōsai
- EXILE TAKAHIRO as Oda Nobunaga
- The Seven of Mist Valley:
  - Chihiro Yamamoto as Yamihime
  - Katsuya as Kinenbo
  - Hayato Onozuka as Ikkan Oboro
  - Seiya Motoki as Akudoji
  - Riki Motoyama as Toad Priest
  - Ryunosuke Hosoda as Puppet Jinnai
  - Yoshiyuki Yamaguchi as Yumedo Tenzen
- Masayuki Deai as Matsunaga Hisahide
- Seiji Fukushi as Akechi Mitsuhide
- Tyson Oya & Yuki Umehara as the Golden Eyes
- Yui Suwa as Okuni

== Theme songs ==
The opening theme is "SWISH DAT!" by PSYCHIC FEVER. The ending theme is "Marmalade" by WOLF HOWL HARMONY.

== Production ==
The series was produced in the spring of 2024.

The series was announced by TV Asahi on September 7, 2025.

In an interview, Miike described seeing the 1969 live-action film adaptation of the manga as a child, saying, "It was a pioneering superhero film, and the ninja Akakage suddenly entered our lives, and it pierced my heart as entertainment. [...] Rather than forcing my own internalized Akakage on myself, or thinking that my childhood dream of 'Akakage must be like this,' I feel like I've come full circle and am now reviving Akakage and creating a film with a young cast."

Describing the production, Katō said, "The filming was so intense that one day felt like a week, and I already have a feeling that the sense of accomplishment will be the greatest of any leading role I've ever played."

The role of Nobunaga's page, Mori Ranmaru, was decided through an audition hosted by LDH including participants from EXPG, a dance school run by LDH, as well as members of the dance performance group RAG POUND. The audition documentary Golden Dream was broadcast on October 9 at 2:36 AM.

The website natalie.mu stated that TV Asahi and Toei had teamed up for the new adaptation to "reinvent it as a 'hero period drama' for the Reiwa era", and the October 2025 issue of World Screen called the series "a modern remake" and stated that there would be 20 half-hour episodes. Discussing the modernization of this adaptation, Miike stated, "I think it's because it's not a simple story of good versus evil. It's set in the Warring States period, so the victor becomes good. And as the ninjas struggle with who they should serve and what they should accomplish, they form a team, and within that teamwork, they form friendships not unlike modern-day relationships, and they even end up talking nonsense... (laughs). I wanted to portray those aspects as well."

== Broadcast ==
The series aired Mondays from 12:10 AM to 12:40 AM (following the Sunday night programming) on TV Asahi. Following its terrestrial broadcast, it was streamed on Telasa and TVer. The first episode aired on October 27, 2025. The first episode was streamed on YouTube for free without audio as a preview.

=== Episodes ===
Episode number	Broadcast date	Episode title	Teleplay	Director
Episode 1	October 27, 2025	その男、忍び ("The Ninja")	Yūsuke Watanabe	Takashi Miike
Episode 2	November 3, 2025	信長の影 ("Nobunaga's Shadow")	Yūsuke Watanabe	Takashi Miike
Episode 3	November 10, 2025	赤影参上 ("Akakage Reporting for Duty")	Yūsuke Watanabe	Takashi Miike
Episode 4	November 17, 2025	決戦、千年蟇 ("The Final Battle with the Thousand-Year Toad")	Yūsuke Watanabe	Takashi Miike
Episode 5	November 24, 2025	金目教の罠 ("The Golden Eye Cult's Trap")	Mari Takura	Hiroki Kashiwagi
Episode 6	December 1, 2025	黒蝙蝠の娘 ("The Black Bat's Daughter")	Mari Takura	Hiroki Kashiwagi
Episode 7	December 15, 2025	織辺多門と南蛮大筒 ("Oribe Tamon and the Western Cannon")	Yūsuke Watanabe	Hiroki Kashiwagi
Episode 8	December 22, 2025	幻妖斎の正体 ("Genyōsai's True Identity")	Yūsuke Watanabe	Hiroki Kashiwagi
Episode 9	January 12, 2026	滝川一益の秘密 ("The Secret of Takigawa Kazumasu")	Yūsuke Watanabe	Ryūsuke Kurahashi
Episode 10	January 19, 2026	霞谷への物語 ("Story for Mist Valley")	Yūsuke Watanabe	Ryūsuke Kurahashi
Episode 11	January 26, 2026	金目像の悪夢 ("Nightmare of the Golden-Eyed Statue")	Yūsuke Watanabe	Ryūsuke Kurahashi
Episode 12	February 2, 2026	急襲、本能寺 ("Surprise Attack at Honnō Temple")	Mari Takura	Ryūsuke Kurahashi
Episode 13	February 9, 2026	散りゆく影 ("Scattered Shadows")	Yūsuke Watanabe	Katsuya Watanabe
Episode 14	February 16, 2026	新たな白影 ("The New White Shadow")	Yūsuke Watanabe	Katsuya Watanabe
Episode 15	February 23, 2026	七人衆最後の一人 ("The Last of the Seven")	Yūsuke Watanabe	Katsuya Watanabe
Episode 16	March 2, 2026	運命にあらがえ ("Defy Fate")	Yūsuke Watanabe	Katsuya Watanabe
Episode 17	March 9, 2026	闇姫の最期 ("Yamihime's Final Moments")	Yūsuke Watanabe	Hiroki Kashiwagi
Episode 18	March 16, 2026	秀吉の決断 ("Hideyoshi's Decision")	Yūsuke Watanabe	Hiroki Kashiwagi
Episode 19	March 23, 2026	最終決戦 ("The Final Showdown")	Yūsuke Watanabe	Hiroki Kashiwagi
Episode 20	March 30, 2026	そこに咲く花 ("The Flowers That Bloom There")	Yūsuke Watanabe	Hiroki Kashiwagi
