= Michael Cho (illustrator) =

Canadian illustrator and cartoonist

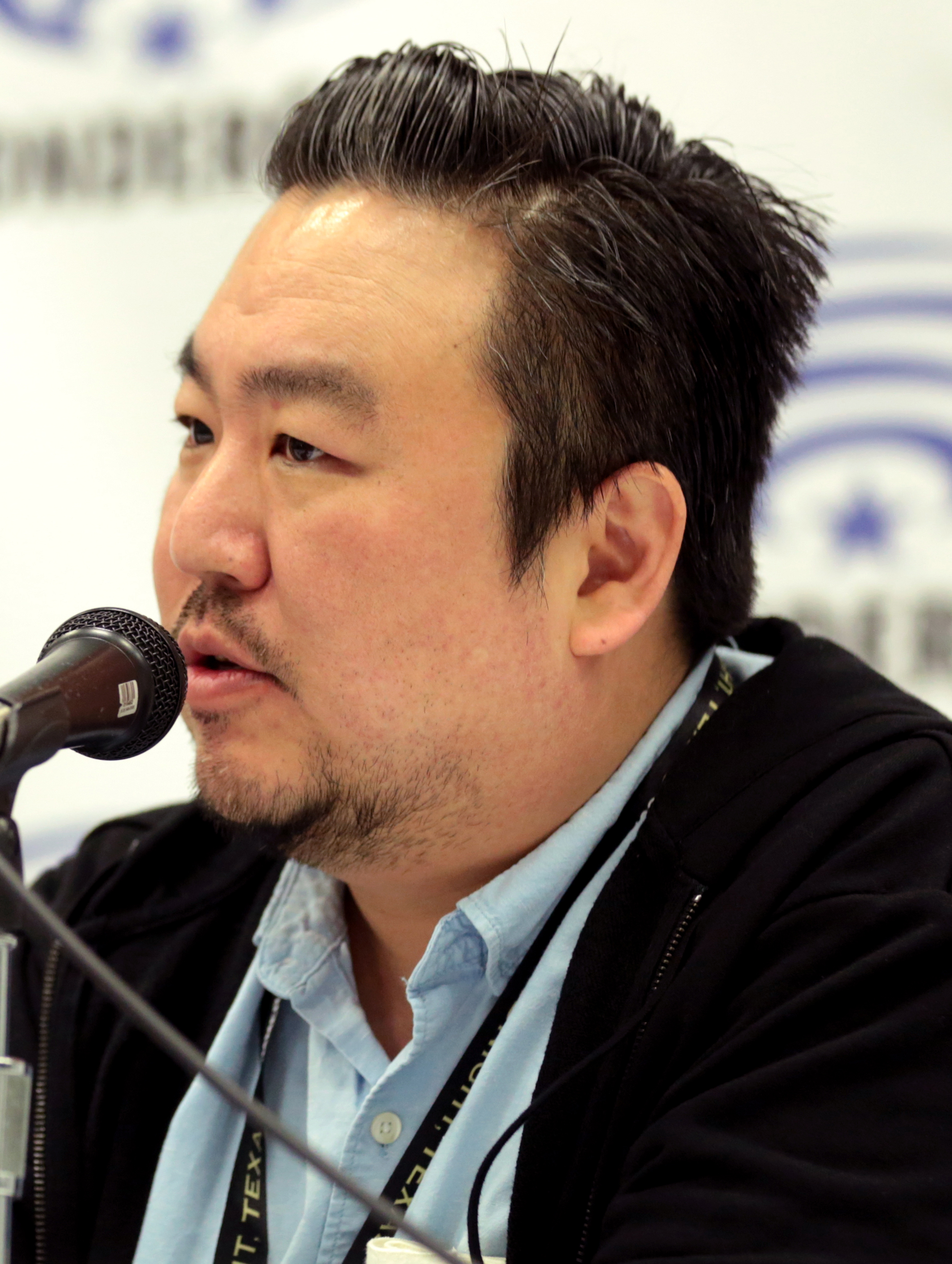
Cho at the 2017 WonderCon.

Michael Cho is a Canadian illustrator and cartoonist. He has been nominated for a number of awards and his work has been positively reviewed.

== Early life ==
Cho was born in Seoul, South Korea, but immigrated to Canada at the age of 6. He has said "In some ways I learned to read English by reading comic books. And of course, I copied all the drawings." Before becoming a successful freelance artist, Cho graduated from Ontario College of Art & Design.

== Career ==
Cho's artwork appears in a number of different genres. He has painted book covers for Random House/Knopf and Penguin Books. His cover for White Noise has been called a "remarkable" design that "masterfully captures" aspects of the novel. He is the creator of the webcomic Papercut, has done illustrations for The New York Times Book Review, and has created comics work for Taddle Creek literary magazine.

His work retains classic comic book aspects and "evokes the pop art of Roy Lichtenstein and aesthetics of Silver and Bronze age superhero comics in equal measure." He has provided cover art for several DC Comics reprint collections and drew the 1940s variant cover for Action Comics #1000 (June 2018). as well as the 1950s variant cover for Detective Comics #1000 (May 2019). Many individuals know about all the work Cho has created for DC and their comics, but Cho has also illustrated cover art for Marvel Comics characters and series such as Captain America, the Fantastic Four, Daredevil, and even Spider-Man.

On September 2, 2014, Cho published his first graphic novel, Shoplifter. Each illustration is done in two-colors. He states that he likes two-tone work because it allows him to focus on the mood and atmosphere. To paint the tones, he used colored inks, and the rest was done with brushes, pens, and brush pens.

Joe Biden's presidential campaign commissioned Michael Cho to design three comic images. The images were posted on their social medias.

In 2025, Cho collaborated with writer Chip Kidd on The Avengers in The Veracity Trap!, a graphic novel published by Abrams ComicsArt as part of their Marvel Arts line.

== Awards and nominations ==
A few accomplishments he has earned are: Silver Canadian National Magazine Award in 2007, a Joe Shuster nomination and also had piece of work make it into the Best American Comics 2010.

- Silver Medal for "Stars" at the 2007 National Magazine Awards
- Honourable Mention for "Night Time" in the Words and Pictures category of the 2004 National Magazine Awards
- Papercut was nominated for a Joe Shuster Award in the webcomics category.
- A story included in The Best American Comics 2010
- Won a Joe Shuster Award in the cover artist category
- Shoplifter appeared on The New York Times Best Seller List for Graphic Novels in 2014
- Received the 2018 Ringo Award for Best Cover Artist
