= Batman: Collected =

Batman: Collected is a 1996 book written by Chip Kidd.

== Contents ==
Batman: Collected is a book in which the character's evolution is chronicled from his 1939 debut to the modern era through an extensive archive of merchandise—including toys, costumes, sketches, rare collectibles, and even quirky items like branded jam jars and soda bottles. Presented in a large-format design, the book juxtaposes photography with commentary on Batman's cultural development and broad appeal.

== Reception ==
Andy Butcher reviewed Batman Collected for Arcane magazine, rating it a 9 out of 10 overall, and stated that "Simply put, Batman Collected is a must-buy for any self-respecting Batman fan. It's stunningly designed throughout and utterly fascinating to look at, full of incredible photographs that often manage to take cheap, throw-away items and transform them into something that truly captures the essence of the character himself. You can feast your eyes on some rare, limited edition models and early artists' sketches, which appear alongside apple jam jars and 'Batman Cola' bottles. Running throughout the book is Chip Kidd's commentary on the stages of Batman's development, history and popular appeal. All in all, Batman Collected is quite simply superb. Okay, so it may not be of much actual use, but nevertheless, die-hard Batman fans are sure to find themselves returning to it again and again."

== Reviews ==
- Bay Area Reporter
