= Moonlight Mask =

Japanese media franchise about a superhero

Moonlight Mask (月光仮面, Gekkō Kamen), a.k.a. Moonbeam Man, is a superhero appearing in Japanese tokusatsu and anime television shows and movies since his TV debut in 1958. The six theatrical films were made (between 1958–1959) in black and white/ToeiScope format. Created by writer Kōhan Kawauchi, Moonlight Mask is best described as Japan's answer to The Lone Ranger, Batman and Zorro.

Moonlight Mask's popularity resulted in the appearance of several other Japanese superhero characters soon thereafter, including Iron Sharp a.k.a. Space Chief (from 1961's Invasion of the Neptune Men) and the Planet Prince TV series (1958). Kawauchi followed-up the success of Moonlight Mask with the tokusatsu superhero shows Seven Color Mask (1959) and Messenger of Allah (1960), both starring a young Sonny Chiba.

== Japan's first TV superhero ==
Whereas Super Giant (Starman) is Japan's first celluloid superhero, debuting in movies in 1957, it was Moonlight Mask (Gekko Kamen) who set the standard as Japan's first live-action TV superhero, and was a huge success with children. Television was new in Japan, so many children who did not have a TV set were gathered around to watch it at a friend's or neighbor's house. Children also bought toy capes, sunglasses, masks and pistols, and played Moonlight Mask in schoolyards and backyards (but as with every children's superhero, Japanese or American, Moonlight Mask was not without liability casualties; see Liability issues and cancellation below).

== Identity ==
Moonlight Mask's identity has always been a mystery (which is why the Moonlight Mask persona is credited as being played by "?" in the original series).

Decked out in white tights, a white and red cape, a white scarf, yellow gloves & boots, dark glasses, a cloth face mask and Indian-style turban (pinned with a "moon" ornament), Moonlight Mask is armed with a whip, two six-shooters, shuriken and moon-shaped boomerangs, and rides a motorcycle.

Only the audience knows that Moonlight Mask could be detective Jūrō Iwai (祝 十郎, Iwai Jūrō), who often disappears just before the caped crusader rides to the rescue. Even Gorohachi Fukuro (袋 五郎八, Fukuro Gorohachi), his comical assistant, Inspector Matsuda, his friend, and his children Shigeru, Kaboko and Fujiko are oblivious to Iwai's secret identity.

== The original 1958 TV series ==
The original B&W Moonlight Mask (月光仮面) tokusatsu TV drama series, produced by the advertising agency Senkosha, was aired on KRTV (now TBS) from February 24, 1958, to July 5, 1959, with a total of 130 episodes, the series being divided into five story arcs (or chapters). Jūrō Iwai/Moonlight Mask was played by Koichi Ose.

=== TV series story arcs ===
- Skull Mask (どくろ仮面 - Dokuro Kamen) - Episodes 1-71, 71 episodes (broadcast from February 24, 1958 – May 17, 1958)
- The Secret of the Paradai Kingdom (パラダイ王国の秘密 - Paradai Ōkoku no Himitsu) - Episodes 73-93, 21 episodes (May 25, 1958 – October 12, 1958)
- Mammoth Kong (マンモスコング - Manmosu Kongu) - Episodes 94-104, 11 episodes (October 19, 1958 – December 26, 1958) features TV's first daikaiju, Mammoth Kong.
- The Ghost Party Strikes Back (幽霊党の逆襲 - Yureitō no Gyakushū) - Episodes 105-117, 13 episodes (January 4, 1959 – March 29, 1959)
- Don't Turn Your Hand to Revenge (その復讐に手を出すな - Sono Fukushū ni Te wo Dasu na) - Episodes 118-131, 14 episodes (April 5, 1959 – July 5, 1959)

== The six theatrical movies (1958–1959) ==
To coincide with the Nippon Gendai/Senkosha TV series, Toei Films produced six Moonlight Mask theatrical movies screened in theaters from 1958 to 1959. This was Toei's first involvement in the tokusatsu superhero genre. All six movies are feature adaptations of the TV show's popular story arcs, and were filmed in "ToeiScope" (2.35:1). Three movies were released in 1958, and three in 1959. In these six movie versions, Jūrō Iwai/Moonlight Mask was played by Fumitake Omura.

- Moonlight Mask (月光仮面 - Gekkō Kamen) July 30, 1958; Directed by Tsuneo Kobayashi
- Moonlight Mask - Duel to the Death in Dangerous Waters (月光仮面 - 絶海の死斗 - Gekkō Kamen - Zekkai no Shitō) August 6, 1958; Directed by Tsuneo Kobayashi
- Moonlight Mask - The Claws of Satan (月光仮面 - 魔人〈サタン〉の爪 - Gekkō Kamen - Satan no Tsume) December 22, 1958; Directed by Eijiro Wakabayashi
- Moonlight Mask - The Monster Kong (月光仮面 - 怪獣コング - Gekkō Kamen - Kaijū Kongu) a.k.a. The Monster Gorilla; April 1, 1959; Directed by Satoru Ainoda
- Moonlight Mask - The Ghost Party Strikes Back (月光仮面 - 幽霊党の逆襲 - Gekkō Kamen - Yureitō no Gyakushū) a.k.a. The Challenging Ghost; July 28, 1959; Directed by Shoichi Shimazu
- Moonlight Mask - The Last of the Devil (月光仮面 - 悪魔の最後 - Gekkō Kamen - Akuma no Saigo) a.k.a. The Last Death of the Devil; August 4, 1959, Directed by Shoichi Shimazu

=== Manga adaptation ===
A few months after the show first aired, a manga (comic book) tie-in was commissioned. There were different artists drawing the manga, the majority of which was done by young artist Jiro Kuwata, who would later become the co-creator of 8 Man.

=== Liability issues and cancellation ===
Children watching superhero shows sometimes attempted to imitate the hero's dangerous feats, and Moonlight Mask was no exception. Because a boy in Japan jumped to his death imitating Moonlight Mask's dangerous stunts, the show was cancelled on July 5, 1959, following the ending of the final story arc, Don't Turn Your Hand to Revenge. Toei's movies, however, continued to appear in theaters well into August 1959. Moonlight Mask made a return to Japanese TV 13 years later.

== The 1972 anime series ==
The anime adaptation Seigi wo Ai Suru Mono – Gekkō Kamen (正義を愛する者 - 月光仮面), translated as The One Who Loves Justice: Moonlight Mask, was produced by Knack, and aired on Nippon Television from January 10, 1972, to October 2, 1972, with a total of 39 episodes (divided into three story arcs or chapters). The show also became very popular in Latin America under the title Centella. Japanese voice actor Michihiro Ikemizu provided the voice of Jūrō Iwai/Moonlight Mask. The hero now wears an open face helmet instead of a turban, and his cape has an ornament with the scarf attached.

=== Anime chapters ===
- The Claw of Satan Series (Episodes 1-13)
- The Mammoth Kong Series (Episodes 14-26)
- The Dragon's Fang Series (Episodes 27-39)

== The 1981 movie ==
The tokusatsu movie Moonlight Mask (月光仮面), produced by Purumie International/Herald Enterprises and distributed by Nippon Herald Pictures, was released theatrically on March 14, 1981. Considered Japan's answer to the American box office fiasco, The Legend of the Lone Ranger (released the same year), this updated version of the Moonlight Mask legend also bombed at the Japanese box office. Daisuke Kuwahara (who, like Klinton Spilsbury, disappeared from doing films) played George Owara (Moonlight Mask's new alter-ego), and the rest of the cast made up of veteran action starlet Etsuko Shihomi, Daijiro Harada and Takayuki Godai, with none of the original characters turning up. The movie was directed and co-written by Yukihiro Sawada.

== The 1999 gag-anime series ==
The gag-anime series We Know You, Moonlight Mask-kun! (ごぞんじ!月光仮面くん - Gozonji! Gekkô Kamen-kun), a very comical take on the famous masked hero, was produced by TMS-Kyokuichi, animated by Actas, and broadcast on TV Tokyo from October 3, 1999, to March 26, 2000, with a total of 25 episodes. The opening theme song is an updated version of the original theme song, and is sung by COA.

== Parodies ==
=== Kekkō Kamen ===
Prolific manga artist Go Nagai made a very raunchy parody of Moonlight Mask, titled Kekkō Kamen (けっこう仮面 - Kekkō Kamen, roughly translated as "Splendid Mask"), a pun on Gekkō Kamen (Moonlight Mask's Japanese name). The manga depicts the adventures of a young superheroine who wears a red mask, scarf, an occasional cape, gloves, boots and nothing else. She has various weapons like nunchaku and a feather on her mask.

=== Moonlight Knight ===
In the anime Sailor Moon, the character Mamoru Chiba appears in the Makaiju arc as the "Moonlight Knight" dressed in a white costume and turban similar to that of Moonlight Mask.

=== Sexy Commando Gaiden: Sugoiyo Masaru-san ===
In the anime Sexy Commando Gaiden: Sugoiyo Masaru-san, Yoroshiku Kamen and his various previous reincarnations (Bye-bye Kamen, Aisatsu Kamen, etc.) all parody Gekkou Kamen and his appeal to children.

=== Spectreman ===
In episode 42, Spectreman faces a mysterious new villain called Solar Mask, a reversed parody of Moonlight Mask whose looks greatly resemble the original hero.

=== Yo-Kai Watch ===
The second entry of the Yo-Kai Watch video game series produced by Level-5 features an in-universe fictional character called "Guts Kamen", or "Moximous Mask" in the English translation, who is modeled after Showa period superheroes in general, and Moonlight Mask in particular.

=== My Neighbors the Yamadas ===
In the movie My Neighbors the Yamadas, Takashi Yamada (the father) imagine chasing cartoon-like mobsters as the moonlight mask for saving his children from them, after that the neighborhood of the Yamadas have been disturbed by bikers. During this scene, we can hear the opening of the live-action series.
