= Fuyukichi Maki =

Japanese actor (1930–1998)

Fuyukichi Maki (牧冬吉, Maki Fuyukichi; November 28, 1930 – June 27, 1998) was a Japanese actor. He worked in TV and film from 1951 to 1997. His birth name was Nobuyuki Okamura (岡村 信行). He was born in Ōdate, Akita, Japan.

He played the role of the Iga ninja Tombei the Mist (Kiri no Tonbei) in the Edo period historical drama TV series The Samurai. This series became a surprise hit in Australia in 1965 and was the first Japanese TV series shown in that country.

== Major movie roles ==
- Akakage (1969)
- Miyamoto Musashi (1973)
- Legend of Dinosaurs & Monster Birds (1977)
- Billiken (1996)

== Major TV roles ==
- Leopard Eye (1959–1960)
- The Samurai (1962–1965)
- Kamen no Ninja Akakage (1967–1968)
- Gokenin Zankurō (1995–1998)
