= Jiro Kuwata =

Japanese manga artist (1935–2020)

- 桑田二郎
- Born: April 17, 1935; Suita Town, Osaka Prefecture, Empire of Japan
- Died: July 2, 2020 (aged 85)
- Occupation: Manga artist
- Writing career
- Pen name: 桑田 次郎
- Period: 1948–2020
- Genre: Shōnen
- Notable works: Moonlight Mask; 8 Man etc.

Jiro Kuwata (桑田 二郎, Kuwata Jirō; alternatively 桑田 次郎; April 17, 1935 – July 2, 2020) was a Japanese manga artist.

== Biography ==
Kuwata was born in Suita, Osaka. He created The Strange Star Cluster (怪奇星団) in 1948. In 1957 he created Maboroshi Tantei (まぼろし探偵; Phantom Detective). He co-created 8 Man with writer Kazumasa Hirai.

In 1965, when he was to finish the final issue of 8 Man, he was arrested for possession of a handgun, and released from prison soon after.

Kuwata died at age 85 in Suita, Osaka.

== Bibliography ==
Manga adaptations of TV shows

- Moonlight Mask
- Batman (published in Western countries as Batmanga)
- Ultra Seven
- The Time Tunnel
- The Invaders

== See also ==
- Bat-Manga!: The Secret History of Batman in Japan
