= The Samurai (TV series) =

1962 Japanese historical fiction TV series

- Genre: Jidaigeki
- Created by: Shinichi Nishimura
- Written by: Masaru Igami; Yasushi Katō
- Directed by: Sadao Funatoko; Tōru Toyama
- Starring: Ose Koichi; Fuyukichi Maki; Ōmori Shunsuke; Bin Amatsu
- Composer: Hirooki Ogawa
- Country of origin: Japan
- Original language: Japanese
- No. of episodes: 128

Production
- Producer: Toshio Kobayashi
- Editor: Michiko Kakui
- Camera setup: Takeshi Nakamachi
- Running time: 24 minutes
- Production company: Senkosha Productions

Original release
- Network: TBS
- Release: October 7, 1962 – July 29, 1965

The Samurai is a Japanese historical fiction television series made by Senkosha Productions during the early 1960s. Its original Japanese title was Onmitsu Kenshi (隠密剣士; "Spy Swordsman"). The series premiered in 1962 on TBS and ran continuously until 1965 for ten self-contained story arcs (seasons), usually consisting of 13 episodes each. Also created were two black-and-white feature films by Toei Company, made in 1964 by the same crew which created the TV series, and a stage show.

The Samurai proved to be highly successful despite its initially very limited budget. It was the first Japanese TV program ever screened in Australia, where it premiered in 1964 and built up a remarkably large fan-base among the local young audience at the time, rapidly becoming a cult favourite. Despite its massive popularity in Australia as well as success in Japan, New Zealand and the Philippines, the series was not widely screened elsewhere and its fame remains largely restricted to those countries.

It was followed in 1965 by the spin-off series The New Samurai (新隠密剣士; Shin Onmitsu Kenshi), featuring a completely new main character; the spin-off ran only 39 episodes, compared to the 128 episodes of the original series. In 1973, a colour TV series was also made for 26 new episodes in an abortive attempt at a remake and then a short-lived reboot. All of the TV series were sponsored by the Takeda Pharmaceutical.

== 1962 series ==
=== Story ===
The series portrayed the adventures of a roving samurai detective/spy, Akikusa Shintarō (秋草新太郎) (played by Koichi Ose), whose real identity is Matsudaira Nobuchiyo - the older half-brother of Tokugawa Ienari, the 11th Tokugawa shogun, who is still a minor. Because he is the son of a concubine, Nobuchiyo has no claim to power, so he assumes the guise of a wandering swordsman named Shintarō to seek out and eliminate plots by rival feudal lords and thus protect his younger brother.

Originally it was planned to make only four distinct stories, with a different hero in each, however Shintarō was received so well that he remained for the rest of the series in which, acting on secret orders from the rōjū (high councillor) Lord Matsudaira Sadanobu, he gathers information mostly in the various fiefdoms of the central Honshū and battles rival warriors and spies, often aided by his faithful ninja assistant Tombei the Mist (霧の遁兵衛, Kiri no Tonbei) (played by Fuyukichi Maki).

==== Characters ====
Akikusa Shintarō appeared as the main character in all ten stories of The Samurai, making his last appearance in the final episode "The Duel", where he was last seen on a boat with his arch-rival Kongō of Kōga, presumably about to engage in a duel to the death out on the lake. He lives among the ordinary people while posing as a rōnin (masterless samurai), working undercover to protect Ienari's position as the shogun. Shintarō is a master swordsman, using the two traditional swords of the samurai (the long katana and the short wakizashi). He is usually shown wearing a kimono, sometimes with a hakama, and has a ponytail (a top-knot and half-shaven head in the first season).

The series' second main character is Tombei the Mist, an Iga Ninja master considered to be the best of the Oniwabanshū employed by the shogun to guard his castle, who first appears in the third story arc (second season in the Australian TV broadcast) and promptly becomes Shintarō's regular sidekick. Tombei is a master of disguise, skilled with shuriken, swords (using the reverse-grip technique) and scaling hooks, also able to call-in the additional Men of Iga, and the two saved each other's lives numerous times. His outfit is a grey version of the shinobi shōzoku Iga outfit (as opposed to the black-clad ninja opponents) and he has a chonmage top-knot hair, sometimes covered by a grey ninja hood.

Later Shintarō is also accompanied by young boy with a pet monkey - Baba Shūsaku (played by Ōmori Shunsuke, replaced by Mitsuru Takeuchi for the first film). Some of the series other most memorable characters were its ninja antagonists, especially those played by the recurring Bin Amatsu.

==== Plot ====
Spy Swordsman (Onmitsu Kenshi)

The opening arc is distinctly western-inspired, with much horseback riding and gun fighting. It portrays the native Ainu people sympathetically as they substitute for American Indians in the frontier-like Ezo (modern Hokkaidō). Fuyukichi Maki appears in several episodes as the Ainu rebel leader Kamokuin, while Bin Amatsu plays two minor roles. It was actually aired as the last season in the Australian run of the series, as it was less representative of the show as a whole.

Shintarō has been ordered to investigate the resources of the Matsumae clan and write a report about them. The lord of Matsumae suspects that this will lead to the shogunate taking control of his fiefdom and sends his fanatically loyal but rightful retainer, Kiba Jinjūrō (played by Toshiyuki Katsuki), who vows to kill Shintarō. During his investigation, Shintarō struggles to help the downtrodden local Japanese villagers and the oppressed Ainu, and also fights local bandits and smugglers, often inadvertently aided by his just rival Kiba.

Koga Ninjas (Ninpō Kōgashū)

The second story (aired as the first season in Australia) introduces ninja to the series, setting a theme that would then dominate The Samurai. Set in Kai Province (modern Yamanashi Prefecture), the story follows the plot of a society of 13 master Kōga Ninja and their followers to use the lost gold mine of a 16th-century warlord Takeda Shingen to further their own ambitions - and Shintarō's efforts to foil them. The Kōga Ninja are led by Kōga Ryūshirō, a descendant of the founder of the Kōga, and include Genzō the Spider (played by Bin Amatsu, the first time in a ninja role), Kurobei who eventually defects to Shintaro, and the female ninja Oyo. Also introduced to the series is Shūsaku, a descendant of the great Takeda general Baba Nobukatsu, a real historical figure, whose father has been kidnapped by the Kōga Ninja.

Iga Ninjas (Ninpō Iga Jūnin)

Set in May 1788, the story concerns the mission of Shintarō, aided by Tombei and his group of Iga Ninja, to stop Momochi Genkurō (played by Toshiyuki Katsuki), the best swordsman in Japan, and the leader of a renegade group of ten master Iga Ninja from the Manji Valley who are hired by the Lord of Owari to assassinate Matsudaira Sadanobu on the Tōkaidō road in the region between Edo and Kyoto. Unknown to his employer, Momochi himself has a secret agenda, to plunge the country back into civil war and revive the golden age of ninjutsu. His group includes a woman ninja Okayo, who at first wants to avenge the death of her brother Koheita, but later develops feelings for Shintarō (a similar character, Kazeba the sister of Nuinosuke, appears in the follow-up story), and Gensai the Wolf (Okami no Gensai) played by Amatsu.

Black Ninja (Ninpō Yami Hōshi)

This story was shown in Australia after the final story even though it follows directly from Iga Ninja later on in 1788. It sees the return of Gensai the Wolf, who joins the Black Ninja (Yami Hōshi - literally Black Priest) group of Kōga Ninja led by Hakuunsai. The story revolves around an attempt to sign up disgruntled daimyō (feudal domain lords, called "landowners" in the series) in a political plot against the central government to install the young lord of the Owari clan as the new shogun. To further their aims the Black Ninja begin killing "secret samurai" in Edo and in the provinces to expose the elaborate system of spies that the shogunate employs to keep tabs on the domain lords. The Black Ninja hope that by doing this they can foment anger and dissatisfaction with the government and induce the clans to join in the plot. Shintarō foils all of the Black Ninja's plans, obtains the scroll containing the signatures of the plotters and eventually uncovers the instigator of the conspiracy and the true identity of Hakuunsai. Finally, in a great act of chivalry he saves the Owari clan from certain annihilation by destroying the proof of the plot against the shogunate.

Fuma Ninja (Ninpō Fūma Ichizoku)

Set in 1790 in and between Edo and Odawara, the story introduces Fūma Kotarō (the chief antagonist being again portrayed by Amatsu), a descendant and namesake of the infamous 16th century ninja Fūma Kotarō. He is obsessed with finding the buried treasure of the Hōjō clan lost at the end of the 16th century when Odawara Castle fell to Toyotomi Hideyoshi, and using the million pieces of gold it contains to revive the fortunes of the Fūma. Three mirrors hold the clues to its location: the Wind Thunder, the Water Tiger and the Fire Dragon mirrors. Most of the story is concerned with the efforts of the Fūma Ninja to find them and later to recover them from Shintarō and Tonbei who had taken them for safe-keeping. The younger sister of Fūma Kotarō, Oboro is introduced along the way and her attempts at obtaining the mirrors form a large part of the story. It ends with the apparent death of Fūma Kotarō when, wounded by Shintarō, he falls from a cliff.

Fuma Ninja Continued (Zoku Ninpō Fūma Ichizoku)

This story continues the search for the Hōjō treasure which takes both Shintarō and the Fūma around the former Musashi and Sagami provinces. As in the case of two of the previous stories, a major enemy falls in love with Shintarō - this time it's the ninja princess Oboro (Naoko Saga, a pop singer from King Records), Kotarō's younger sister who has been introduced in the first part of the Fuma story and would also return in Contest of Death. Her attempts to aid Shintaro are discovered by Kotarō who orders his men to kill her. She is used as bait to trap Shintarō but he rescues her from certain death. In the end, Kotarō and Shintarō duel until Kotarō, apparently mortally wounded, blows himself up together with the treasure.

Ninja Terror (Ninpō Negoru-Shū)

This story is set in Kii Province (modern Wakayama Prefecture) in December 1789 and concerns the succession of the new lord of Wakayama. The rightful heir is Prince Yorikata, supported by the retainer Oribe Hida and guarded by six Kishū Ninja led by Genyō. Opposed to him is another retainer, Naitō Daigaku, who wants to put Yorikata's younger brother Yoshitsuna in his place so he would become the regent and control Kii. Naitō eventually wants to also assassinate Ienari and install Yoshitsuna as the 12th shogun and control the entire country. To this end he employs the Negoro Ninja, led by Garyūdōshi (played by Yoshio Yoshida), to carry out his plans, while Shintarō and Tonbei aid Yorikata and the Kishū Ninja.

Phantom Ninja (Ninpō Mabaroshi-Shū)

This story is set in and around Edo and concerns the mysterious Lord of Night (Kurayami no Gotairō) and his attempt to bring about Matsudaira Sadanobu's downfall by destroying those closest to him. To this end he hires Kongō of Kōga (actually Kotarō, returning due to popular demand from fans, and once again played by Amatsu) who in turn hires the seven Phantom (Maboroshi) Ninja from Phantom valley in Koga to assassinate those whose names appear in the so-called Book of Death. These include Tonbei and the other Iga Ninja as well as Shintarō. Shintarō thwarts all but one of the attempts to assassinate the others in the book and one by one he kills off the Phantom ninja, foiling their plot to disgrace Lord Sadanobu. In the end he is able to unmask the Lord of Night as Lord Rokkaku, one of the shogun's advisors.

This story is notable because the Phantom Ninja "baddies" are portrayed with some depth and sensitivity. It also portrays a woman Phantom ninja named Chidori as being in every way equal to her male companions with interesting ninja weapons and techniques of her own. She is also one of only three female ninja in the series who manage to resist Shintarō's charms and remain true to their cause (the other two being Oko in Ninja Terror and Namiji in Fuma Ninja Continued).

Puppet Ninja (Kugotsu Ninpōchō)

Set in Kyūshū, this story is about Shintarō's battles with a group of Puppet Ninja, led by the ancient master Genshin. Tonbei is sent to Hizen Province (modern Nagasaki and Saga prefectures) to spy on the lords there because of suspected smuggling. When he fails to report, Shintarō goes after him and discovers Genshin of the Shiranui clan has been bringing in guns smuggled from abroad and distributing them to other lords in Hizen with the ultimate aim of toppling the central government and taking control of Japan. Kongō reappears in this story, stalking Shintarō and even saving him from the hands of the Puppet Ninja once so he can kill him himself later. This story was shorter than usual (only 10 episodes) because of the broadcast of the 1964 Summer Olympics.

Contest of Death (Ayakashi Ninpōchō)

The originally final season of the whole series. Set in 1790, it tells of Kongō's attempts to have Shintarō assassinated by ninja of different schools, until they eventually turn on him instead. They see him, no less than Shintaro himself, as an obstacle to their ambitions. The season ends with Kongō and Shintarō leaving together in a boat sailing, as Shintaro says, into the far distance. There is in fact no duel between Shintaro and Kongo, because he and Kongo have already duelled successfully with the five ninja masters who believe (in vain) that they can bring back civil disruption and hence the glory days of the ninja clans. Wearied of fighting, Shintaro, with the disenchanted Kongo (who now sees the dream of restoring the past of bloodshed and violence to be futile), leaves for another life, his mission achieved and society at peace. As he and Kongo depart, Shūsaku, Tombei the Mist, and Oboro (Kotarō/Kongō's sister from the Fuma Ninja stories) remain behind on the shore, sadly crying out their farewells. A true hero—a true embodiment of Samurai chivalry—Shintaro retires into a glorious anonymity, his quests all accomplished.

=== Music ===
The music accompanying The Samurai was composed by Hirooki Ogawa and was quite innovative for the time. It uses both Western and traditional instruments, with percussion playing a large part. There is a series theme song which is played frequently using both vocal and instrumental variations, in various keys and tempos. There are also a number of leitmotifs which recur throughout the series. Individual stories often have their own musical themes, the most notable of these being the "running" music and the "House of Death" theme in Phantom Ninjas and the "puppet player" song in Puppet Ninja.

=== Reception ===
Presumably responding to the increasing interest in Japan that accompanied the 1964 Tokyo Olympics, a few episodes of The Samurai were screened by Channel 9, Sydney in early 1964. After this first screening Channel 9 took the unprecedented step of inviting viewers to write in if they wanted to see more; the result was one of the largest viewer responses in the station's history, with thousands of letters sent in requesting more episodes. The entire series was shown, though the storylines were presented out of their original sequence as shown in Japan, which denied the Australian audience the intended effect of a mysterious, open-ended conclusion to the show. By 1965 it was the TV hit of the year, becoming the most popular programme in TCN-9's history up to that time, surpassing even The Mickey Mouse Club and sparking the first wave of ninja-mania outside Japan. The level of popularity it attained is remarkable given there was still much resentment of Japan in Australia at the time, although it may be explained by the fact that most of the fans were children and teenagers. The program proved so popular that a promoter brought out star Ose Koichi and a large supporting troupe to appear in a specially written 90-minute stage play based on the show, which played to capacity houses in both at the Sydney Stadium and Melbourne, and it was reported that more people (over 7,000, many of them in costume) turned out to greet Ose when he arrived at Essendon Airport in Melbourne than greeted The Beatles when they visited there in June 1964.

The success of The Samurai led Sydney TV channel ATN-7 to screen Phantom Agents (Ninja Butai Gekkō), another ninja-themed TV series but set in the 1960s Japan, which then developed its own cult following. Novelist Ruth Manley took names, even characters and incidents from the show and recast and wove them into her three children's novels based on Japanese myths and folklore, The Plum Rain Scroll (1978), The Dragon Stone (1982) and The Peony Lantern (1987). In 2009 SBS One broadcast a TV documentary titled Shintaro! The Samurai Sensation That Swept a Nation that reviewed the Australian impact of the show and then was itself released on DVD in 2010.

=== Home releases ===
Two VHS tapes were released in Japan in 1999/2000, one of The Samurai (containing the episodes "The Man From Edo", "The Stolen Case" and "The Duel") and one of The New Samurai (the episodes "The Search for Kage", "An Enemy Returns" and "The Star Sword"). The whole series was released on DVD (20 discs in a boxed set) in June 2003, later re-released as separate stories in April 2004. The discs are Region 2 and in Japanese only.

Siren Visual released six story arcs of The Samurai on DVD in Australia between September 2002 and February 2006. In February 2010 Siren Visual Entertainment began releasing the complete series in English (remastered, with optional original Japanese sound track with subtitles) for the first time.

== Films ==
The first film, titled simply Onmitsu Kenshi and released on March 28, 1964, concerns a group of daimyō led by the Lord of Owari involved in a conspiracy to overthrow the shogun. The lead ninja antagonist, Kōga Ryūshirō from the second story, was again played by Bin Amatsu and the new character of his sister Kasumi was played by Junko Fuji. An English-subtitled version of the film entitled Detective Fencer has aired on the NGN (Nippon Golden Network) channel in Hawaii. A fan-subbed version entitled Spy Swordsman was also made available on DVD.

The second film, titled Zoku Onmitsu Kenshi ("Spy Swordsman Continued") and released on August 2 of the same year, concerns the search for a buried treasure in seven gold mines in the Izu Peninsula and features the Fūma and the Iga ninja clans as well as the Tokugawa clan.

== Other TV series ==
=== The New Samurai ===
The sequel series, made by the same creators (again produced by Shinichi Nishimura, written by Masaru Igami, scored by Hirooki Ogawa and directed by Funatoko Sadao and Tōru Toyama), run from 1964 and 1965. The New Samurai (Shin Onmitsu Kenshi) was originally aired in three story arcs on TBS between October 7, 1973 to March 31, 1974, however it failed to repeat the success of the first series. In Australia, where the first-run episodes of the new series replaced its predecessor on NWS-9 in January 1972, the new show was itself taken over just two weeks later by Josie and the Pussycats.

The story of the second series is taking place in the turbulent Satsuma Domain in southern Kyūshū. This time the main character is Kage Shinnosuke (影信之介) (played by Shinichirō Hayashi), the head of the Kage (Shadow) Ninja group, aided by a ninja girl Kanae (played by Mizue Shiratori), a boy named Daisaku (played by Hideki Ninomiya), and the returning Tonbei the Mist (played again by Maki) who has been sent to investigate the mysterious unrest there. Bin Amatsu also returned in his usual role of a villain, playing Togakure Genki, chieftain of the Black Tide band of ninja pirates.

=== 1973 series ===
The Samurai was revived in conjunction with Toei in October 1973 as a new, colour series starring Shinichi Ogishima as Shintarō. As by this time Sadao Funatoko had died, the direction was given to his former assistant director, Akira Kikuchi. Traditionally, the head villain (the Akame ninja leader Garō Tessō) was played by Amatsu and Maki was also cast in his usual role of Shintarō's ninja companion, this time named Kayazaru (賀夜猿), but otherwise the cast was new, including Kyōko Yoshizawa as Shintarō's love interest and Masahide Yamada as his new boy sidekick. Two distinctively different seasons were made, each containing 13 episodes.

The series began on TBS on October 7, 1973 under the title Onmitsu Kenshi in the style of the original show. However, due to the failing ratings, in its second story arc the series has been renamed as Onmitsu Kenshi: Tsuppashire! (隠密剣士突っ走れ！) and pitted the hero against a variety of supernatural enemies such as demons, ghosts and dragons. Just as the previous attempt, this one also failed to achieve the success level of the original, and so the franchise's final episode was aired on March 31, 1974.

== In popular culture ==
In 1983, the Australian band Men at Work released a song called "Shintaro" about the main character, released as the B-side of the single "It's a Mistake" from their second album Cargo.

== Sources ==
Nikki White's extensive fansite (with permission) and the Japanese Wikipedia.
