= Chip Kidd =

American graphic designer (born 1964)

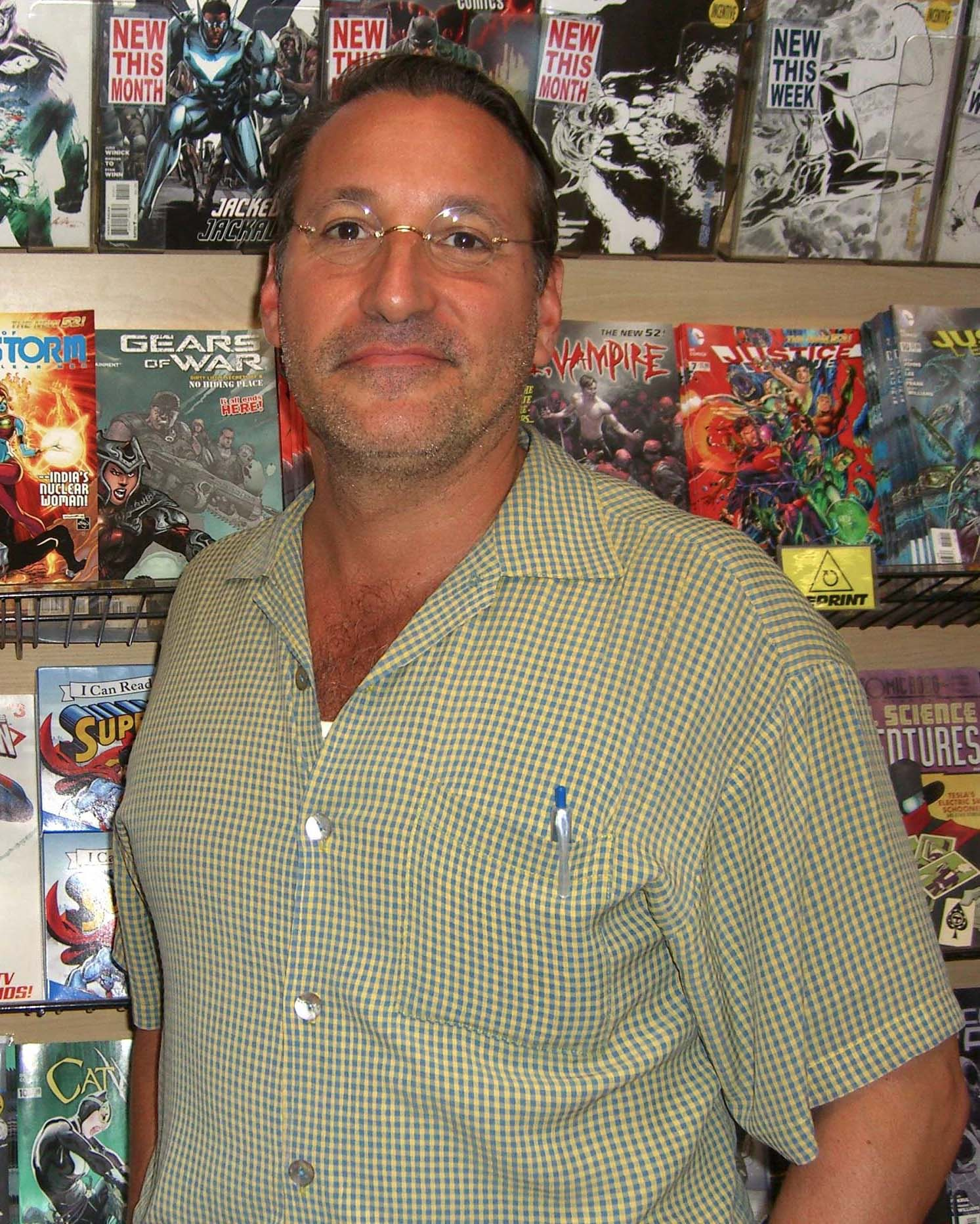
- Kidd at a June 2012 book signing at Midtown Comics in Manhattan
- Born: Charles Kidd; 1964 (age 61–62); Reading, Pennsylvania, U.S.
- Education: Pennsylvania State University (BA)
- Occupations: Graphic designer, writer
- Notable credit(s): Jack Cole and Plastic Man: Forms Stretched to Their Limits, The Cheese Monkeys, The Learners, Bat-Manga!, Jurassic Park
- Spouse: J. D. McClatchy (m. 2013; died 2018)

Charles Kidd (born 1964) is an American graphic designer, editor and author, best known for his book covers. As of 2024, he is the vice president and art director at Knopf and editor-at-large for graphic novels at Pantheon. He is the author of two novels and numerous non-fiction books on comics and graphic design, with a particular interest in DC's Batman series. Kidd is the recipient of five Eisner Awards, the 2014 AIGA Medal and the 2007 American National Design Award for communication design.

== Early childhood ==
Born in Shillington in Berks County, Pennsylvania, Kidd grew up being fascinated and heavily inspired by American popular culture. He stated that he was introduced to graphic design through the 1966 Batman TV show and comic books featuring Batman and Superman. Kidd attended Pennsylvania State University, where he graduated in 1986 with a degree in graphic design.

== Career ==
Throughout his career, Kidd has been a graphic designer, book designer, editor, author, lecturer and musician.

=== Cover design ===
External videos
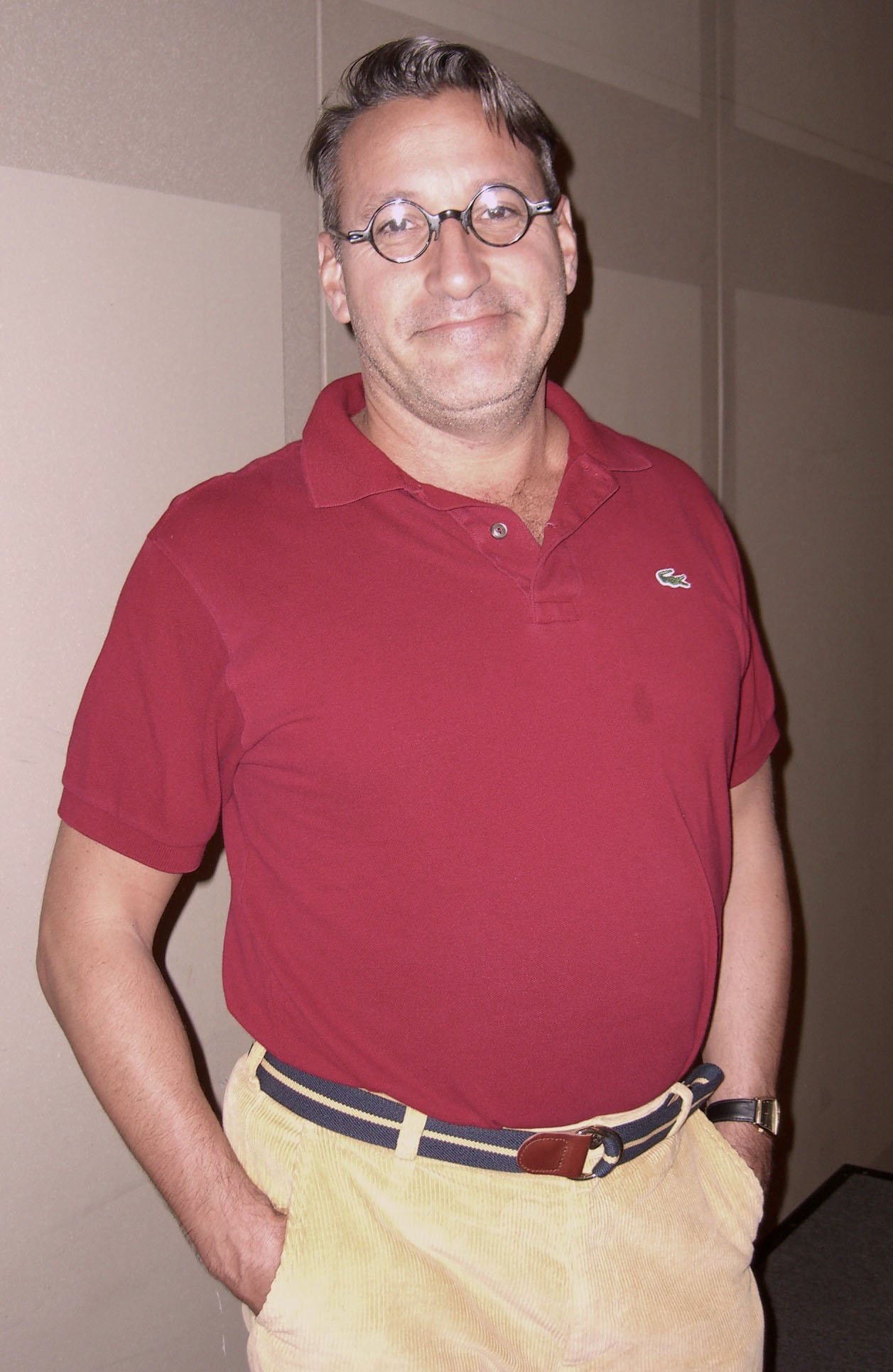
- The hilarious art of book design, Chip Kidd, 17:16, April 4, 2012, TED talk

Kidd is considered to be one of the most influential modern book cover designers. According to Graphic Design: American Two, he has been credited with “helping to spawn a revolution in the art of America book packaging in the last ten years.” One of the most consistent characteristics of Kidd's style is the fact that his book covers don't carry one signature look, as he states: “A signature look is crippling… [because] the simplest and most effective solutions aren't dictated by style.”

As of 2024, he is the vice president and art director at Alfred A. Knopf, an imprint of Random House. He first joined the Knopf design team in 1986, soon after graduating college and moving to New York, when he was hired as a junior assistant. Turning out jacket designs at an average of 75 covers a year, Kidd has also freelanced for Amazon, Doubleday, Farrar Straus & Giroux, Grove Press, HarperCollins, Penguin/Putnam, Scribner and Columbia University Press.

His output includes cover concepts for books by Mark Beyer, Bret Easton Ellis, Haruki Murakami, Dean Koontz, Cormac McCarthy, Anne Rice, Frank Miller, Michael Ondaatje, Alex Ross, Charles Schulz, Osamu Tezuka, Gengoroh Tagame, David Sedaris, Donna Tartt, John Updike, Tony Millionaire and others.

His most notable book cover design was for Michael Crichton's Jurassic Park novel, which was so successful that it carried over into marketing for the 1993 film adaptation and the franchise that followed. Oliver Sacks and Tony Millionaire have contract clauses stating that Kidd must design their book covers. Kidd's influence on the book-jacket has been amply noted —Time Out New York has said that “the history of book design can be split into two eras: before graphic designer Chip Kidd and after.”

Kidd has also worked with writer Lisa Birnbach on True Prep, a follow-up to her 1980 book The Official Preppy Handbook.

Publishers Weekly described his book jackets as "creepy, striking, sly, smart, unpredictable covers that make readers appreciate books as objects of art as well as literature." USA Today also called him "the closest thing to a rock star" in graphic design today, while author James Ellroy has called him “the world's greatest book-jacket designer.”

==== Views ====
Kidd is often asked about his creative process. On the source of his inspiration, Kidd told Matt Pashkow in Inspirability that “for the most part I'm inspired by whatever the book is, or by the manuscript itself.” For the USA Today, he outlined his process for creating a cover. After closely reading the work he contacts the author, who “has final say, so it's a logical starting point.” “Along the way, I may or may not involve photographers or illustrators or any amount of ephemeral detritus that washes up on my shores in the pursuit of solving the problem. And that is what it always amounts to: visually solving a problem.” He says that this solution can take up to six months to find.

Kidd has often downplayed the importance of cover designs, stating, "I'm very much against the idea that the cover will sell the book. Marketing departments of publishing houses tend to latch onto this concept and they can't let go. But it's about whether the book itself really connects with the public, and the cover is only a small part of that." He is also known to be humorously self-deprecating about his work with statements such as "I piggy-backed my career on the backs of authors, not the other way around. The latest example of that is The Road, by Cormac McCarthy. I'm lucky to be attached to that. Cormac McCarthy is not lucky to have me doing his cover."

=== Comic Books ===
In addition to his work in book covers, since 2000 Kidd also has edited and supervised graphic novels at Pantheon.

Kidd is a huge fan of comic book media, particularly Batman. He is considered one of the world's leading experts on Batman. He stated that the first cover he ever noticed was "no doubt for some sort of Batman comic I saw when I was about 3, enough said. Or maybe not enough said: the colors, the forms, the design. Batman himself is such a brilliant design solution." Veronique Vienne, who wrote an eponymous book about Kidd in 2006, described Kidd's Batman fandom as a "childhood obsession and lasting adult passion".

Kidd has written and designed book covers for several DC Comics publications, including The Complete History of Batman, Superman, and Wonder Woman, The Golden Age of DC Comics: 365 Days, and Jack Cole and Plastic Man. He also designed Mythology: The DC Comics Art of Alex Ross and wrote an exclusive Batman/Superman story illustrated by Ross for the book.

In 1996, Kidd designed and wrote his first comic book Batman: Collected.

In 2002, Kidd provided the cover design for the 2002 version of Batman: The Dark Knight Returns collected edition (ISBN 156389341X) and also the Batman: The Dark Knight Strikes Again collected edition (ISBN 978-1-56389-929-4). He designed the lettering font for the cover of Batman: Year One 2005 deluxe edition (ISBN 1401206905) while also served as the book designer for 2024 Artist's Edition (ISBN 979-8-88724-003-9) of the comic book title which was published by IDW Publishing.

In 2003, Kidd collaborated with Art Spiegelman on a biography of cartoonist Jack Cole, Jack Cole and Plastic Man: Forms Stretched to Their Limits.

In 2005, Kidd designed the font title for All Star Batman & Robin, the Boy Wonder and All-Star Superman comic books.

Kidd also worked with fellow Batman collector Saul Ferris on another book of a more particular subject, Bat-Manga!: The Secret History of Batman in Japan, which was released for sale in October 2008.

In 2012, Kidd wrote an original graphic novel titled as Batman: Death by Design. Kidd collaborated with artist Michael Cho in 2025 on The Avengers in The Veracity Trap!, a graphic novel published by Abrams ComicsArt as part of their Marvel Arts line.

==== Animation ====
In 2010, Kidd collaborated with the writing staff of the animated series Batman: The Brave and the Bold on the episode "Bat-Mite Presents: Batman's Strangest Cases!" The episode contained a segment that was heavily inspired by the Batman manga of the 1960s.

==== Advocacy ====
In 2013, Kidd was announced as a member of the newly formed advisory board of the Comic Book Legal Defense Fund, a non-profit organization founded in 1986 chartered to protect the First Amendment rights of the comics community.

=== Novels ===
His first novel, The Cheese Monkeys, (Simon & Schuster, 2001) is an academic satire and coming-of-age tale about state college art students who struggle to meet the demands of a sadistic graphic design instructor. The book draws on Kidd's real-life experiences during his art studies with Lanny Sommese at Penn State.

Kidd's second novel, The Learners, finds the protagonist of The Cheese Monkeys drawn into the infamous Milgram experiment, thanks to an incidental newspaper ad assignment. The novel uses the experiment as an extended metaphor for advertising, wherein the "content" is masked and fed—sometimes unwillingly—to its consumers.

=== Music ===
In early 2008, Kidd started a new wave/alternative rock band, writing and recording music under the name Artbreak. He takes the role of song writing, vocals, and percussion, and while the group began as hobby, Kidd has expressed interest in making a serious project out of it. As of 2008, the group performs across the United States and has a tour schedule on their MySpace. They plan to record their original songs for an album entitled Wonderground.

=== Talks ===
Kidd has presented lectures at Princeton, Yale, Harvard, RISD, and numerous other institutions, including the 2012 Technology, Entertainment, Design (TED) Conference, resulting in a TED Talk web video: “Designing books is no laughing matter. OK, it is,” that as of 2025 has over 2,700,000 views. In 2013 he returned to Penn State where he presented his lecture “Fail Better.”

He writes about graphic design and pop culture for publications including McSweeney's, The New York Times, Vogue, and Entertainment Weekly.

== Honors ==
- Will Eisner Comic Industry Award (2025, 2016, 2004, 2002, 1999)
- Inkpot Award (2015)
- AIGA medal (2014)
- National Design Award for Communication (2007)
- International Center of Photography's Infinity Award for Design (1997)

== Personal life ==
Kidd lives on Manhattan's Upper East Side. He was married to the late poet and Yale Review editor J. D. McClatchy; the couple married in November 2013.

== Published works ==
=== Fiction ===
- The Cheese Monkeys: A Novel in Two Semesters (2001)
- The Learners: The Book After "The Cheese Monkeys" (2008)

=== Graphic novels ===
- Batman: Death by Design (2012) – art by Dave Taylor
- The Avengers in the Veracity Trap (2025) – art by Michael Cho

=== Comics (short) ===
- "The Bat-Man," in Bizarro Comics (2001) – art by Tony Millionaire
- "The Trust," in Mythology: The DC Comics Art of Alex Ross (2003) – art by Alex Ross
- "Batman with Robinson the Boy Wonder," in Bizarro World (2005) – art by Tony Millionaire

=== Nonfiction ===
- Spider-Man: Panel by Panel (2025)
- Chip Kidd: Book Two: Work: 2007-2017 (2018). ISBN 978-0-8478-6008-1
- Only What's Necessary: Charles M. Schulz and the Art of Peanuts (2015)
- Judge This. Simon & Schuster/ TED. 2015. ISBN 978-1-4767-8478-6.
- Massive: Gay Erotic Manga and the Men Who Make It (2014)
- Go: A Kidd's Guide to Graphic Design (2013)
- The Passion of Gengoroh Tagame: Master of Gay Erotic Manga (2013)
- Shazam!: The Golden Age of the World's Mightiest Mortal (2010)
- Rough Justice: The DC Comics Sketches of Alex Ross (2010)
- True Prep: It's a Whole New Old World (2010) – co-authored with Lisa Birnbach
- Bat-Manga!: The Secret History of Batman in Japan (2008)
- Chip Kidd: Book One: Work: 1986-2006 (2005)
- Mythology: The DC Comics Art of Alex Ross (2005)
- Jack Cole and Plastic Man: Forms Stretched to Their Limits (2001) – co-authored with Art Spiegelman
- Peanuts: the Art of Charles M. Schulz (2001)
- Batman Animated (1998) – co-authored with Paul Dini
- Batman Collected (1996)
