= Ishihara Gōjin =

Japanese illustrator

- 石原 豪人
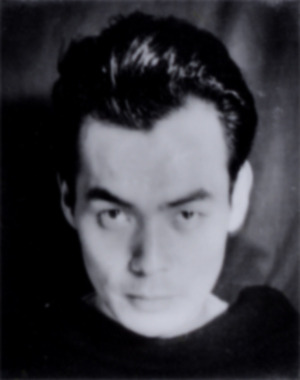
- Ishihara Gōjin in 1952

Personal details
- Born: Ishihara Tōru; March 15, 1923 Taisha, Shimane Prefecture, Empire of Japan
- Died: June 19, 1998 (aged 75)

Military service
- Allegiance: Imperial Japanese Army
- Years of service: 1942-1945
- Battles/wars: World War II

Ishihara Tōru (Japanese: 石原 徹; March 15, 1923 – June 19, 1998), known by the pseudonyms Ishihara Gōjin (石原 豪人) and Hayashi Gekkō (林 月光), was a Japanese painter and illustrator.

== Biography ==
Ishihara was born in the city of Taisha, Shimane in 1923. He first encountered art through his frequent visits to a local theatre. In 1941, at the age of 18, he moved to Manchukuo and then Mengjiang where he made a living painting advertisements for silent films.

He was eventually drafted into the Imperial Japanese Army as part of its mobilization during the Second World War. While stationed in Mongolia, he was nearly killed in an incident of friendly fire, an experience that affected him greatly. Ishihara later attributed his disdain for authority of any kind to this event. After returning home to Japan, he attended lectures at Nihon University's art department where he was exposed to the artistic principles of Norman Rockwell. He began his career as an illustrator in earnest around 1955, drawing for the magazines Meisei (明星) and Heibon (平凡).

He rapidly developed a reputation as an artistic genius, and so his contribution was in high demand and he began to work under an onerous schedule. At one point, he was obliged to draw 100 illustrations in 3 days. He also worked with Edogawa Ranpo. By the late 1950s and early 1960s, Ishihara was well known for his works' distinctive themes of eroticism and surreal horror. He also contributed to gay and BDSM magazines under the name Hayashi Gekkō. His motto was "To have no likes or dislikes makes a high-quality person" (好き嫌いがなくてこそ高級な人間, Sukikirai ga nakute koso kōkyū na ningen).

One of his final works, a 1996 full-page cover illustration for the first issue of the magazine Seikimatsu Club (世紀末倶楽部) featuring figurers such as Shoko Asahara and Ruth Norman, was published just prior to his death in 1998.

== See also ==
- Itō Hikozō
