= Senkosha Productions =

Japanese television production company

Senkosha Productions was the television production arm of the large Japanese advertising agency the Senkosha Company. The Tokyo-based Senkosha Company still exists, though it has long since closed its television division, now known as Senko Kikaku (Senko Planning). Among the shows Senkosha Productions produced were The Samurai, Moonlight Mask, Planet Prince, Silver Kamen, Iron King, and Super Robot Red Baron.
