= Kōhan Kawauchi =

Japanese screenwriter (1920–2008)

Kōhan Kawauchi 川内 康範
- Born: Kiyoshi Kawauchi (川内 潔); February 26, 1920; Hakodate, Hokkaido, Japan
- Died: April 6, 2008 (aged 88); Hachinohe, Aomori, Japan

Kōhan Kawauchi (川内 康範, Kawauchi Kōhan); February 26, 1920 – April 6, 2008), also known as Yasunori Kawauchi, was a Japanese screenwriter who created various tokusatsu series, including the first, Moonlight Mask, in 1958. He was originally from Hakodate, Hokkaido. His series Warrior of Love Rainbowman (1972) is considered to be an inspiration for Go Nagai's Cutie Honey. Other tokusatsu shows he created include Seven Color Mask (1959) and Messenger of Allah (1960). He also wrote the screenplay for Seijun Suzuki's Tokyo Drifter.

== Personal life ==
Kawauchi converted to Islam in 1959. This led to his creation of the tokusatsu superhero series Messenger of Allah in 1960.

== Filmography ==
=== Created ===
- Warrior of Love Rainbowman (1972)
- Seven Color Mask (1959)
- Messenger of Allah (1960)

=== Writer ===
- Ramayana (1943) - first work
- Tokyo Drifter (1967)
