= Tokusatsu =

Japanese film genre

Protagonists of popular tokusatsu franchises mostly of the late 1970s (from back to front, left to right): Ultraman Joneus (Ultra Series), Battle Fever J (Super Sentai), Kamen Rider Stronger and Kamen Rider V3 (Kamen Rider Series), and Spider-Man. Manga character Doraemon is on the far left.

Tokusatsu (特撮(とくさつ); lit. 'special filming') is a Japanese term for live-action films or television programs that make heavy use of practical special effects. Credited to special effects director Eiji Tsuburaya, tokusatsu mainly refers to science fiction, superhero, fantasy, or horror media featuring such technology but is also occasionally dubbed a genre itself. Its contemporary use originated in the Japanese mass media around 1958 to explain special effects in an easy-to-understand manner and was popularized during the "first monster boom" (1966–1968). Prior to the monster boom, it was known in Japan as tokushu gijutsu (特殊技術; lit. 'special technology') or shortened tokugi (特技; lit. 'special technique').

Subgenres of tokusatsu include kaiju such as the Godzilla and Gamera series; superhero such as the Kamen Rider and Metal Hero series; Kyodai Hero like Ultraman and Denkou Choujin Gridman; and mecha like Giant Robo and Super Robot Red Baron. Some tokusatsu television programs combine several of these subgenres, for example, the Super Sentai series.

Tokusatsu is one of the most popular forms of Japanese entertainment, but only a small proportion of tokusatsu films and television programs are widely known outside of Japan. Certain aspects have attained popularity outside of Japan. For example, Godzilla has featured in popular American-made movies.

== History ==
=== 1908–1933: Early development ===
Tokusatsu has origins in early Japanese theater, specifically in kabuki (with its action and fight scenes) and in bunraku, which utilized some of the earliest forms of special effects, specifically puppetry. Japanese cinema pioneer Shōzō Makino is credited as the founding father of tokusatsu techniques, having directed several jidaigeki films starring Matsunosuke Onoe that featured special effects. Makino's effects work inspired filmmaker Yoshirō Edamasa to employ such technology in his own movies, notably Journey to the West (1917) and The Great Buddha Arrival (1934).

=== 1933–1945: Influence from King Kong and wartime efforts ===
After researching the special effects featured in King Kong (1933), Eiji Tsuburaya began to develop tokusatsu and had his breakthrough on Princess Kaguya (1935) and The Daughter of the Samurai (1937). Modern tokusatsu, began to take shape in the late 1940s.

=== 1954–present: Widespread recognition ===
Tsuburaya and the director Ishirō Honda became the driving forces behind 1954's Godzilla. Tsuburaya, inspired by the American film King Kong, formulated many of the techniques that would become staples of the genre, such as so-called suitmation—the use of a human actor in a costume to play a giant monster—combined with the use of miniatures and scaled-down city sets. Godzilla forever changed the landscape of Japanese science fiction, fantasy, and cinema by creating a uniquely Japanese vision in a genre typically dominated by American cinema. This film also helped Tsuburaya's employer Toho establish itself as the most successful effects company in the world.

Godzilla kickstarted the kaiju genre in Japan, creating the "Monster Boom", which remained extremely popular for several decades, with characters such as the aforementioned Godzilla, Gamera and King Ghidorah leading the market. In 1957 Shintoho produced the first film serial featuring the superhero character Super Giant, signaling a shift in popularity that favored masked heroes over giant monsters. Along with the anime Astro Boy, the Super Giant serials had a profound effect on the world of tokusatsu.

In 1958, Moonlight Mask premiered, the first of numerous televised superhero dramas that would make up one of the most popular tokusatsu subgenres. Created by Kōhan Kawauchi, he followed up its success with the tokusatsu superhero shows Seven Color Mask (1959) and Messenger of Allah (1960), both starring a young Sonny Chiba.

These original productions preceded the first color-television tokusatsu series, Ambassador Magma and Ultraman, which heralded the Kyodai Hero subgenre, wherein a regular-sized protagonist grows to larger proportions to fight equally large monsters. Popular tokusatsu superhero shows in the 1970s included Kamen Rider (1971), Warrior of Love Rainbowman (1972), Super Sentai (1975, trademarked in 1979) and Spider-Man (1978).

== Techniques ==
=== Miniatures ===
Tokusatsu is recognized for its heavy use of miniature sets, especially in the Kyodai Hero subgenre. Miniatures are placed from the camera's perspective to create the illusion that the characters are larger than they are.

=== Suitmation ===
Suitmation (スーツメーション, Sūtsumēshon) is the term used to describe the process in tokusatsu movies and television programs used to portray a monster using suit acting. The exact origin of the term remains unknown. At the least, it was used to promote the Godzilla suit from The Return of Godzilla.

== Franchises and productions ==
The many productions of tokusatsu series have general themes common throughout different groups.

=== Kaiju ===
Kaiju (怪獣, kaijū; literally "mysterious beast") productions primarily feature monsters, or giant monsters (大怪獣, daikaijū). Such series include Ultraman, the Godzilla film series, the Gamera series, the Daimajin series, and films such as Mothra, The War of the Gargantuas, and The X from Outer Space, whose Japanese title was 宇宙大怪獣ギララ (Uchu Daikaijū Girara, "Cosmic Daikaijū Girara").

=== Kaijin ===
Kaijin (怪人, literally "mysterious person") productions primarily feature supervillains as their central character. This includes films such as The Invisible Avenger, Half Human, The H-Man, The Secret of the Telegian, and The Human Vapor.

=== Popular franchises ===
Since about 1960, several long-running television series have combined various other themes. Tsuburaya Productions has had the Ultra Series starting with Ultra Q and Ultraman in 1966. P Productions began their foray into tokusatsu in 1966 with the series Ambassador Magma. They also had involvement in the Lion-Maru series which concluded in November 2006.

Toei Company has several series that fall under their Toei Superheroes category of programming, starting in 1958 with the film series, Moonlight Mask. Then, they produced several other long-running series, starting with Shotaro Ishinomori's Kamen Rider Series in 1971, the Super Sentai Series series in 1975, the Metal Hero Series in 1982, and the Toei Fushigi Comedy Series in 1981.

Toei also produced several other television series based on Ishinomori's works, including Android Kikaider and Kikaider 01, Robot Detective, Inazuman and Inazuman Flash, and Kaiketsu Zubat. Toei was also involved in the Spider-Man television series, which influenced their subsequent Super Sentai series.

In 2003, TV Asahi began broadcasting the Super Sentai and Kamen Rider series in a one-hour block airing each week known as Super Hero Time. Toho, the creators of Godzilla, also had their hands in creating the Chouseishin Series of programs from 2003 to 2006 and the Zone Fighter franchise.

In 2006, Keita Amemiya's Garo, a mature late-night tokusatsu drama, was released, starting a franchise composed of several television series and films. Other mature late-night series followed, including a revival of Lion-Maru in Lion-Maru G, the Daimajin Kanon television series (based on the Daimajin film series), and Shougeki Gouraigan!!, also created by Amemiya.

=== Tokusatsu movies ===
Various movies classified as tokusatsu can include disaster movies and science fiction films. These include Warning from Space (宇宙人東京に現わる, Uchūjin Tōkyō ni arawaru; Spacemen Appear in Tokyo) (1956), The Three Treasures (日本誕生, Nippon Tanjō), Invasion of the Neptune Men (宇宙快速船, Uchū Kaisokusen; High Speed Spaceship), The Last War (世界大戦争, Sekai Daisensō; The Great World War), The Green Slime (ガンマー第3号 宇宙大作戦, Ganmā daisan gō: uchū daisakusen; Ganma 3 Space Mission), Submersion of Japan (日本沈没, Nihon Chinbotsu; Japan Sinks), The War in Space (惑星大戦争, Wakusei Daisensō; War of the Planets), Virus (復活の日, Fukkatsu no Hi; Day of Resurrection), Bye-Bye Jupiter (さよならジュピター, Sayonara Jupitā), and Samurai Commando: Mission 1549 (戦国自衛隊1549, Sengoku Jieitai 1549; Sengoku Self-Defense Forces 1549).

== Similar productions ==
=== Non-traditional tokusatsu productions ===
Non-traditional tokusatsu films and television programs may not use conventional special effects or may not star human actors. Though suitmation typifies tokusatsu, some productions may use stop-motion to animate their monsters instead, for example Majin Hunter Mitsurugi in 1973. TV shows may use traditional tokusatsu techniques, but are cast with puppets or marionettes: Uchuusen Silica (1960); Ginga Shonen Tai (1963); Kuchuu Toshi 008 (1969); and Go Nagai's X Bomber (1980).

Some tokusatsu employed animation in addition to its live-action components: Tsuburaya Productions' Dinosaur Expedition Team Bornfree (1976), Dinosaur War Izenborg (1977) and Pro-Wrestling Star Aztekaiser (1976).

=== Japanese fan films ===
As the popularity of tokusatsu increased in Japan, several fan film projects have been produced over the years. Hideaki Anno, Yoshiyuki Sadamoto, Takami Akai, and Shinji Higuchi set up a fan-based group called Daicon Film, which they renamed Gainax in 1985 and turned into an animation studio. Besides anime sequences, they also produced a series of tokusatsu shorts parodying monster movies and superhero shows. These productions include Swift Hero Noutenki (1982), Patriotic Squadron Dai-Nippon (1983), Return of Ultraman (1983) and The Eight-Headed Giant Serpent Strikes Back (1985).

== Outside of Japan ==
Tokusatsu techniques have spread outside Japan due to the popularity of Godzilla films.

=== Adaptations ===
Godzilla, King of the Monsters! first appeared in English in 1956. Rather than a simple dub of the Japanese-language original, this work represented an entirely re-edited version that restructured the plot to incorporate a new character played by a native English-speaking actor, Raymond Burr. Ultraman gained popularity when United Artists dubbed it for American audiences in the 1960s.

In 1993, Mighty Morphin Power Rangers premiered on Fox Kids. The series used action footage from Toei's Kyōryū Sentai Zyuranger for its first season and Gosei Sentai Dairanger and Ninja Sentai Kakuranger for its second and third seasons respectively. Produced by Saban Entertainment, Power Rangers adapted Super Sentai for 30 seasons; using footage from 25 Super Sentai Series. Both series are currently in hiatus. Due to the success of Power Rangers, Saban produced other series using footage from other Toei series. The first being VR Troopers using footage from Metal Hero Series: Choujinki Metalder, Jikuu Senshi Spielban, and Space Sheriff Shaider. VR Troopers ran in syndication. Saban went on to produce Beetleborgs based on Juukou B-Fighter and B-Fighter Kabuto. Saban's Masked Rider is based on Kamen Rider Black RX.

In 2002, 4Kids Entertainment bought the rights to Ultraman Tiga, but simply produced a dub of the Japanese footage, broadcast on the FoxBox. And in 2009, Adness Entertainment took 2002's Kamen Rider Ryuki and turned it into Kamen Rider: Dragon Knight, which began broadcast on The CW4Kids in 2009. It won the first Daytime Emmy for "Outstanding Stunt Coordination" for its original scenes.

In 2023, GMA Network released Voltes V: Legacy, an adaptation of the original Voltes V, which used special effects and CGI heavily reminiscent of those found in traditional tokusatsu shows, with some western influences added. In 2006, YTV Monster Warriors used CGI for the monsters with humor in the show.

=== Original productions ===
In 1961, England-based filmmakers produced the Godzilla-style film, Gorgo, which used the same situation technique as the Godzilla films. That same year, a Danish-American co-production between Saga Studios and Cinemagic made two Godzilla-style giant monster films, both named Reptilicus, bringing each monster to life using a marionette on a miniature set. In 1967, South Korea produced its monster movie titled Yonggary.

In 1975, Shaw Brothers produced a superhero film called The Super Inframan, based on the huge success of Ultraman and Kamen Rider there. The film starred Danny Lee in the title role. Although there were several similar superhero productions in Hong Kong, The Super Inframan came first. With help from Japanese special effects artists under Sadamasa Arikawa, they also produced a Japanese-styled monster movie, The Mighty Peking Man, in 1977.

Concurrent with their work on Superhuman Samurai Syber-Squad, DIC attempted an original concept based on the popularity of Power Rangers in 1994's Tattooed Teenage Alien Fighters from Beverly Hills. In 1998, a video from an attempted Power Rangers-styled adaptation of Sailor Moon surfaced, combining original footage of American actresses with original animated sequences. Saban attempted to make their own unique tokusatsu series entitled Mystic Knights of Tir Na Nog, set in medieval Ireland and featured four, later five knights who transform using the power of the elements (for the most part) at they protected their kingdom from evil.

Saban produced the live-action Teenage Mutant Ninja Turtles series Ninja Turtles: The Next Mutation, which was known in the turtles' fandom for introducing a female turtle exclusive to that series called Venus de Milo and eliminating the fact that the other turtles were brothers. The show mostly featured actors in costumes, but featured similar choreographed fights like other tokusatsu shows.

Like other Tokusatsu Productions, the Syndicated Big Wolf on Campus and Nickelodeon's Animorphs are also described as "American Tokusatsu" due to the techniques they employed. Fujiyama Ichiban is a 2013 web series shot in Los Angeles. All the other Tokusatsu shows in YTV's Monster Warriors were shot in Barrie, Ontario, Canada. They used CGI for the monsters.

In the 2000s, production companies in other East Asian countries began producing their own original tokusatsu-inspired television series: Thailand's Sport Ranger and South Korea's Erexion in 2006; the Philippines' Zaido: Pulis Pangkalawakan (itself a sanctioned spinoff of Toei's Space Sheriff Shaider) in 2007; China's Armor Hero (Chinese: 铠甲勇士; pinyin: Kǎi Jiǎ Yǒng Shì) in 2008, Battle Strike Team: Giant Saver (Chinese: 巨神战击队; pinyin: Jùshén zhàn jí duì) in 2012, Metal Kaiser (Chinese: 五龙奇剑士; pinyin: Wǔ Lóng Qí Jiàn Shì); and Indonesia's Bima Satria Garuda which began in 2013.

In July 2019, Vietnam's Transform Studio co-operating with Dive Into Eden announced their own original tokusatsu series, Mighty Guardian (Vietnamese: Chiến Thần). The first season in the series is Mighty Guardian: Lost Avian (Vietnamese: Chiến Thần Lạc Hồng), using Vietnamese Mythologies as the main concept.

=== Influence ===
Kaiju and tokusatsu films, notably Warning from Space (1956), sparked Stanley Kubrick's interest in science fiction films and influenced 2001: A Space Odyssey (1968). According to his biographer John Baxter, despite their "clumsy model sequences, the films were often well-photographed in colour ... and their dismal dialogue was delivered in well-designed and well-lit sets."

Steven Spielberg cited Godzilla as an inspiration for Jurassic Park (1993), specifically Godzilla, King of the Monsters! (1956), which he grew up watching. During its production, Spielberg described Godzilla as "the most masterful of all the dinosaur movies because it made you believe it was really happening." Godzilla also influenced the Spielberg film Jaws (1975).

Japanese tokusatsu movies also influenced one of the first video games, Spacewar! (1961), inspiring its science fiction theme. According to the game's programmer Martin Graetz, "we would be off to one of Boston's seedier cinemas to view the latest trash from Toho" as Japanese studios "churned out a steady diet of cinematic junk food of which Rodan and Godzilla are only the best-known examples."

=== Homage and parody ===
In 1998, a Brazilian webcomic inspired by both Power Rangers and Super Sentai entitled Combo Rangers was published on the Internet, created by Japanese-Brazilian author Fábio Yabu. The webcomic's popularity allowed it to become a printed comic book until 2004 and having a reboot through Graphic Novels in the 2010s.

In 2001, Buki X-1 Productions, a French fan-based production company, produced its own series, Jushi Sentai France Five (now called Shin Kenjushi France Five), a tribute to Toei's long running Super Sentai series. The low-budget television series Kaiju Big Battel directly parodies monster and Kyodai Hero films and series by immersing their own costumed characters in professional wrestling matches among cardboard buildings. In 2006, Mighty Moshin' Emo Rangers premiered on the Internet as a Power Rangers spoof, but was quickly picked up by MTV UK for broadcast. The popularity of tokusatsus in Brazil in the 90s provided many fans in the country who even tried to make indie series, the most notable being Insector Sun (a low-budget tribute to Kamen Rider) and TimerMan.

Peyton Reed, the director of the Ant-Man films in the Marvel Cinematic Universe, said that Ant-Man's costume design was influenced by two tokusatsu superheroes, Ultraman and Inframan.

In 2015, Brazilian indie game studio, Behold Studios, developed a Power Ranger and Super Sentai inspired game, Chroma Squad.

Tokusatsu has also had a large influence on western animation. Artist Thomas Perkins has delved into work that makes reference to tokusatsu. This is most notable in the design of the character Way Big from Ben 10, who bears a striking resemblance to Ultraman.

In March 2024, Oxford English Dictionary included the word Tokusatsu as a loanword along with others from Japanese culture.

== Bibliography ==
- Allison, Anne (2006). Millennial Monsters: Japanese Toys and the Global Imagination. Asia-Local Studies/Global Themes 13. Berkeley, Calif.: University of California Press. ISBN 0-520-24565-2. OCLC 690263415.
- Craig, Timothy J., ed. (2015) [2000]. Japan Pop!: Inside the World of Japanese Popular Culture (Reprint ed.). New York: Routledge. ISBN 978-0-7656-0560-3. OCLC 1099932333.
- Grays, Kevin (Summer 1990). "Welcome to the Wonderful World of Japanese Fantasy". Markalite: The Magazine of Japanese Fantasy. Vol. 1. Kaiju Productions/Pacific Rim Publishing.
- Godziszewski, Ed. (November–December 1994). "The Making of Godzilla". G-FAN. No. 12. Daikaiju Enterprises.
- Martinez, D. P., ed. (2003) [1998]. The Worlds of Japanese Popular Culture: Gender, Shifting Boundaries, and Global Cultures. Contemporary Japanese Society (Reprint ed.). Cambridge: Cambridge Univ. Press. ISBN 0-521-63729-5. OCLC 634442451.
- Ryfle, Steve (1999). Japan's Favorite Mon-Star: The Unauthorized Biography of "The Big G". Toronto: ECW Press. ISBN 1-55022-348-8. OCLC 38748971. AKA Japan's Favorite Mon-Star: The Unauthorized Biography of Godzilla.
- Yoshida, Makoto; Ikeda, Noriyoshi; Ragone, August (Summer 1990). "The Making of 'Godzilla Vs. Biollante'—They Call it 'Tokusatsu'". Markalite: The Magazine of Japanese Fantasy. Vol. 1. Kaiju Productions/Pacific Rim Publishing.
