= Warrior of Love Rainbowman =

Japanese television series

- Created by: Kōhan Kawauchi
- Starring: Kunihisa Mizutani; Eriko Ishigawa; Akihiko Hirata
- Music by: Jun Kitahara
- Country of origin: Japan
- Original language: Japanese
- No. of episodes: 52

Production
- Producers: Masayoshi Kataoka (NET); Koichi Noguchi (Toho)
- Running time: 24 minutes (per episode)
- Production companies: NET; Toho Co., Ltd.

Original release
- Network: ANN (NET)
- Release: 6 October 1972 – 18 September 1973

Related
- Manga
- Written by: Mitsuru Adachi
- Published by: Kodansha
- Magazine: TV Magazine Otomodachi
- Original run: 1972 – 1973

- Warrior of Love Rainbowman

愛の戦士レインボーマン (Ai no Senshi Reinbōman)
- Anime television series
- Directed by: Nobuhiro Okasako
- Produced by: Sayumi Kawauchi
- Music by: Jun Kitahara
- Studio: MBS/Ai Kikaku Center
- Original network: TBS
- Original run: 10 October 1982 – 27 March 1983
- Episodes: 22

Warrior of Love Rainbowman (愛の戦士レインボーマン, Ai no Senshi Reinbōman) is a tokusatsu series created by Kōhan Kawauchi. This was the first live action superhero TV series produced by Toho Company Ltd., and was broadcast on NET (now TV Asahi) from October 6, 1972, to September 18, 1973, with a total of 52 episodes. Mitsuru Adachi wrote a manga series based on the show which was serialized in TV Magazine Otomodachi from 1972 to 1973.

== Overview ==
The series focuses on pro wrestler Takeshi Yamato, a young man who, after training in India with the yogi sage Devadatta, gains the ability to transform into a superhero called Rainbowman who possesses seven different superhero forms called "Dashes", with the seven Dashes representing yin and yang (the Moon and the Sun) and the five elements (wu xing) of ancient Chinese philosophy. In each Dash form, Rainbowman is endowed with a color-coded costume and powers related to that element. Dash 1 (yellow) represents the Moon, Dash 2 (red) represents fire, Dash 3 (blue) represents water, Dash 4 (green) represents wood, Dash 5 (gold) represents metal, Dash 6 (brown) represents earth, and Dash 7 (white) represents the Sun. Later in the series, he gains the ability to create a fusion state between Dash 7 and any two other forms with all their related powers.

Rainbowman opposes the "Die Die Gang", a group representing hostile foreign powers bent on revenge against Japan for acts carried out in World War II. They make use of elite mercenaries, cyborgs, wizards and supernatural monsters in pursuit of their plans.

In 1982, a 22-episode anime remake loosely based on the series was produced. Instead of a superhero as in the live action series, the anime featured a young man who commands seven giant robots which can merge into a larger giant robot.

== Cast ==
- Takeshi Yamato (大和 タケシ, Yamato Takeshi): Kunihisa Mizutani (水谷 邦久, Mizutani Kunihisa)
- Devadatta: Shōbun Inoue (井上 昭文, Inoue Shōbun)
- Tami Yamato (大和 たみ, Yamato Tami): Kakuko Motoyama (本山 可久子, Motoyama Kakuko)
- Miyuki Yamato (大和 みゆき, Yamato Miyuki): Eriko Ishigawa (石川 えり子, Ishigawa Eriko)
- Ichirō Yamato (大和 一郎, Yamato Ichirō): Hiroshi Koizumi (小泉 汪 (as 小泉 博), Koizumi Hiroshi)
- Hisasō Yamato (大和 久蔵, Yamato Hisasō): Junji Masuda (増田 順司, Masuda Junji)
- Akiko Yamato (大和 秋子, Yamato Akiko): Reiko Mutō
- Toshie (淑江, Toshie): Megumi Itō (伊藤 めぐみ, Itō Megumi)
- Mr. K (ミスターK, Misutā Kei): Akihiko Hirata
- God Iguana (ゴッドイグアナ, Goddo Iguana): Machiko Soga

== Theme songs ==
=== Opening song ===
Yuke Rainbowman (行けレインボーマン, Go Rainbowman)

- Lyrics: Kawauchi Kohan
- Composition: Jun Kitahara
- Singer: Yū Mizushima (as Kenji Yasunaga)

=== Closing songs ===
Yamato Takeshi no uta (ヤマトタケシの歌, Theme of Yamato Takeshi (ep. 1 - ep. 13))

- Lyrics: Kawauchi Kohan
- Composition: Jun Kitahara
- Singer: Yū Mizushima

Aitsu no namae wa Rainbowman (あいつの名前はレインボーマン, That Man's Name is Rainbowman (ep. 14 - ep. 52))

- Lyrics: Kawauchi Kohan
- Composition: Jun Kitahara
- Singers: Cat's Eye and Young Fresh

=== Other song ===
- Shineshine-dan no uta (死ね死ね団の歌, Theme of Shineshine-dan)
- Lyrics: Kawauchi Kohan
- Composition: Jun Kitahara
- Singers: Cat's Eye and Young Fresh
