= Sailor Moon (1994 TV pilot) =

Unaired American TV animation series pilot

- Screenshot of the pilot's animation
- Genre: Magical girl & Superhero fiction
- Based on: Sailor Moon by Naoko Takeuchi & Kodansha
- Directed by: Rocky Solotoff
- Narrated by: Patricia Alice Albrecht
- Country of origin: United States
- Original language: English

Production
- Producers: Raymond Iacovacci; Rocky Solotoff; Steven Wilzbach
- Running time: 10 minutes
- Production companies: Renaissance-Atlantic Entertainment; Toon Makers, Inc.

Related
- Sailor Moon; Sailor Moon Crystal; Pretty Guardian Sailor Moon (2003 TV series)

Sailor Moon, also known under the nickname of Saban Moon, is an unaired proof of concept pilot episode that loosely adapts the Japanese manga and anime television series Sailor Moon. The pilot episode featured a mixture of live-action and animation, as well as a diverse cast of young women who secretly fight evil. It was directed by Rocky Solotoff, and a two minute music video was created alongside the pilot.

The pilot was not picked up for production and was not distributed; the two minute music video was shown at an Anime Expo convention in 1995, where it was videotaped via camcorder. The pilot episode was assumed lost until its discovery in 2022 by YouTuber Ray Mona.

== Synopsis ==
The pilot episode began with an animated section that shows how Sailor Moon and her friends, the Princess Warriors, were forced to flee to Earth. The evil Queen Beryl has taken over the outer Solar System and taken their Jewels of Power. Only the Moon, Earth, Jupiter, Mars, Venus, and Mercury still hold their Jewels of Power, infuriating Queen Beryl. These remaining planets have come together to form a federation led by Queen Serenity of the Moon, in hopes of becoming strong enough to put an end to Queen Beryl's evil. Meanwhile Sailor Moon has fallen in love with Prince Darian (Note: The Toon Makers, Inc. script spells the character's name "Darian".) of the Earth and intend to wed. Their betrothal ceremony is interrupted and Sailor Moon, her white cat Luna, and her friends are forced to flee the moon with their planets' Jewels of Power. Plans to meet up with Darian are shattered when his spaceship is destroyed in the fight. With few other options available to them, the girls use a black hole to travel to Earth.

The live-action portion shows the girls' life on Earth, where they attend a girls' academy and live in their dorms. Their peaceful lives there are disrupted by Luna informing them that they must travel to and defend the planet Jupiter. Their battle is shown as another animated segment where they manage to overcome all of the enemies save one, which is larger than the others. Sailor Moon is only able to defeat the monster after an unknown man in a tuxedo shows up and gives her extra power via a single white rose that he throws towards the monster and Sailor Moon. With the monsters successfully vanquished, the girls return to Earth.

== Cast ==
The identity of the actors used in the pilot were not disclosed in the footage. YouTuber Ray Mona was able to ascertain their identities by interviewing the actress who portrayed Sailor Jupiter, Tami-Adrian George. The identity of the actor portraying Prince Darian/Tuxedo Mask remains unknown.

- Stephanie Dicker as Victoria/Sailor Moon
- Melinda "Mindy" Cowan as Blue/Sailor Mercury, she is portrayed as a wheelchair user
- Danny "Dani" DeLacey as Dana/Sailor Mars, she is portrayed as Asian
- Tami-Adrian George as Sara/Sailor Jupiter, she is portrayed as African-American
- Maria Chaidez (Ria Chase) as Carrie/Sailor Venus, she is portrayed as Hispanic/Latina
- Melendy Britt as the voice of Luna
- Adrienne Barbeau as Queen Serenity and Queen Beryl
- Patricia Alice Albrecht as the Narrator

== Development ==
Plans to develop an American adaptation of Sailor Moon began in 1993. Per Ray Mona, Bandai and Toei Animation wanted to introduce the series to Western audiences and developed "Project Y" towards this end. Possible methods included a live-action film, an unrelated cartoon series, and dubbing the existing series into English. Renaissance-Atlantic Entertainment and Toon Makers, Inc. were brought on to the project, and it was decided that the series would be a new creation loosely based on the source material. The show would utilize both animation and live-action, and a 17 (reduced eventually to 10) minute proof of concept pilot was created alongside a music video on a budget of $280,000.

Several girls auditioned for the pilot. The girls were individually selected by producers Rocky Solotoff and Steven Wilzbach, who wanted to feature a diverse cast. Solotoff, who served as the pilot's director, stated that he "wanted to keep the flavor of Sailor Moon and make it something where people who had no idea what it was could identify with these characters." Sets from the American television series Saved by the Bell were used for the pilot, and actress Adrienne Barbeau was brought on to portray both Queen Beryl and Queen Serenity at the behest of Solotoff. Other actresses who performed in the pilot included Tami-Adrian George, Melendy Britt, and Patricia Alice Albrecht. For Solotoff, the cat portraying Luna was drugged in order to keep it docile and compliant, resulting in it "peeing on everything". Toon Makers, Inc. were given specific concept requirements for the pilot, one of which were sailboards that the Sailors would use for transport, which Solotoff believed was designed for toy sales. The characters of Luna and Artemis were also combined into a single white cat that would telepathically communicate with Sailor Moon.

Originally intended to enter full production in 1994 as part of the children's programming on Fox, the series was eventually scrapped in favor of dubbing the original anime produced by DIC Productions (Now WildBrain). Per Rich Johnston, this move was made due to the expense of creating the live-action and animated portions, which would require the use of union workers. The logo created for the pilot would be later re-used for the English dub; Irwin Toy released a "Moon Cycle" as part of its merchandise for the show, based on vehicles designed for the pilot. Frank Ward, along with his company Renaissance-Atlantic Entertainment, tried to salvage the concept of a live-action Sailor Moon series and created a 2-minute reel for a prospective series named Team Angel. The series would have followed four girls who would travel to Earth in order to defeat evil.

== Discovery ==
The two-minute music video, which contained footage from the pilot, was screened at the 1995 Anime Expo in Los Angeles, where it was taped via camcorder. This footage would later be uploaded to video sites such as YouTube. It was given the colloquial name of "Saban Moon" despite having no connection with Saban Entertainment save for Renaissance-Atlantic Entertainment, which worked with the company on Power Rangers.

The pilot episode was assumed lost, and Solotoff was frequently contacted about the music video footage by people hoping to locate the full pilot. Rich Johnston covered the search for Bleeding Cool, noting that Solotoff was contacted approximately twice a week about the missing pilot. He further remarked that copyright would pose a potential barrier if the pilot were discovered, as the holders would need to grant their permission for the pilot to be shared, and that the copyright owner was believed to be Toei.

The pilot's script and animation cels were uncovered in Los Angeles in 2012, after a storage locker believed to have been owned by producer and animator Raymond Iacovacci was auctioned off. The buyer placed the script and cels on eBay. After the pilot failed, Iacovacci was given the scripts and animation cels for safekeeping. In 2018, Kotaku's Cecilia D'Anastasio wrote an article about her research into the unaired pilot episode. She interviewed Solotoff and Frank Ward, then president of Renaissance Atlantic, who made her aware of the Team Angel proof of concept. At the time of D'Anastasio's investigation, Ward believed that she was looking for footage of Team Angel, the second attempt made to bring a live-action Sailor Moon to fruition. He informed D'Anastasio that he still had a copy of the proof of concept and screened it for the journalist, who had been expecting Solotoff's pilot episode. Further discussion between D'Anastasio, Solotoff, and Ward resulted in both men stating that they were unaware if any of the pilot's footage still existed or where it might be found. The footage for the second proof of concept, which had never been previously publicly released, was published via Kotaku.

In 2022, YouTuber Ray Mona published a two-part documentary series on the history of Sailor Moon being brought to Western audiences, the pilot's creation, and her search for the episode on her channel, entitled "The Western World of Sailor Moon". Assisted in her search by D'Anastasio, Ray Mona was able to locate a copy of the pilot in the Library of Congress; the second part of the documentary discussed her search for the pilot and petitioning for access, as well as the pilot in its entirety. Ray Mona was granted permission by Ward to access the pilot and release it on YouTube.

== Reception and legacy ==
Video footage of the music video's screening at AnimeExpo shows the audience reacting to the footage with laughter. Victoria McNally of The Mary Sue commented on the footage in 2014, remarking that "I know we're laughing at this video because it's cheesy compared to the original, but we all would have watched the hell out of this show. The '90s was a very, very cheesy time." Timothy Donohoo of CBR.com, referring to the material uncovered in the storage locker and the AnimeExpo footage, was critical of the changes made to the characters and of the animation, calling it a "genuine trash fire" and that the "show's art direction fits in much better with an early '80s cartoon than one from the early '90s, making its other questionable components even worse."

The discovery of the pilot episode received media attention from outlets such as IGN and The Verge, the latter of which felt that the pilot was "totally worth the wait". GameRevolution remarked on the pilot, calling it the "holy grail of lost media" and praised Ray Mona's documentary series as a "fascinating journey and opens the door to dive into further aspects of its development." Nerdist also covered the pilot, calling it a "'90's time capsule" and writing that "they totally westernized Sailor Moon's animation style, losing all of its anime flavor. Sailor Moon and her friends look more like Jem and the Holograms. And the live-action footage feels like an episode of the '90s sitcom Blossom." Shane Stahl of Collider criticized the pilot as "flush with awkwardness", questioning "are the girls entering a different dimension when they transform into their animated counterparts? Are they time-traveling? What does any of this mean?" Princess Weekes of The Mary Sue criticized the pilot as cringy and not having much to praise while also noting that the presence of a disabled main character (Sailor Mercury is depicted as a wheelchair user) as "one of the actually promising and interesting things about the pilot."

On August 31, 2022, the Library of Congress highlighted the findings on their blog. Eric Graf, the individual who fulfilled Mona's order, revealed himself to be an avid anime fan, and recalled being "jaw-floored" upon seeing the request and that "it's been even bigger than I expected". The Library of Congress wrote that the series' newfound reception "says something quite positive about the cult of fandom as well as the value in collecting and then enabling to endure even the most minor and fleeting efforts of creative endeavor."
