= List of crime films of the 1970s =

This is a list of crime films released in the 1970s.

Title	Director	Cast	Country	Notes
1970
Bloody Mama	Roger Corman	Shelley Winters, Pat Hingle, Don Stroud	United States	
Borsalino	Jacques Deray	Alain Delon, Jean-Paul Belmondo, Michel Bouquet	France; Italy	
A Bullet for Pretty Boy	Larry Buchanan	Fabian Forte, Jocelyn Lane, Astrid Warner	United States	
Le Cercle rouge	Jean-Pierre Melville	Alain Delon, Bourvil, Gian Maria Volonté	France; Italy	
Cold Sweat	Terence Young	Charles Bronson, Liv Ullmann, James Mason	France, Italy	Crime drama
The Cop	Yves Boisset	Michel Bouquet, Françoise Fabian, Michel Constantin	France	
Delinquent Girl Boss: Blossoming Night Dreams	Kazuhiko Yamaguchi	Reiko Oshida, Masumi Tachibana, Yukie Kagawa	Japan	
La Horse	Pierre Granier-Deferre	Jean Gabin, Elenore Hirt, André Weber	France; Italy; West Germany	
The Honeymoon Killers	Leonard Kastle	Shirley Stoler, Tony Lo Bianco, Dortha Duckworth	United States	
Investigation of a Citizen Above Suspicion	Elio Petri	Gian Maria Volonté, Florinda Bolkan, Salvo Randone	Italy	Crime drama
Kaidan Noboriryu	Teruo Ishii	Toru Abe, Yoshi Katō, Makoto Satō	Japan	
Last Leap	Édouard Luntz	Maurice Ronet, Michel Bouquet, Cathy Rosier	France; Italy	
Perfect Friday	Peter Hall	Ursula Andress, David Warner, Stanley Baker	United Kingdom	
Stray Cat Rock: Sex Hunter	Yasuharu Hasebe	Nobuko Aoiki, Tatsuya Fuji, Mie Hanabusa	Japan	
Le Temps des loups	Sergio Gobbi	Robert Hossein, Charles Aznavour, Virna Lisi	France; Italy	
1971
$	Richard Brooks	Warren Beatty, Goldie Hawn, Gert Fröbe	United States	
10 Rillington Place	Richard Fleischer	Richard Attenborough, Judy Geeson, John Hurt	United Kingdom	
The Anderson Tapes	Sidney Lumet	Sean Connery, Dyan Cannon, Martin Balsam	United States	
Les Assassins de l'ordre	Marcel Carné	Jacques Brel, Catherine Rouvel, Charles Denner	France; Italy	Crime drama
Les Aveux les plus doux	Édouard Molinaro	Caroline Cellier, Roger Hanin, Philippe Noiret	France; Algeria; Italy	Crime drama
The Big Doll House	Jack Hill	Judy Brown, Roberta Collins, Pam Grier	United States, Philippines	Prison film
A Clockwork Orange	Stanley Kubrick	Malcolm McDowell, Patrick Magee, Michael Bates	United Kingdom	Juvenile delinquency film
Le Casse	Henri Verneuil	Jean-Paul Belmondo, Omar Sharif, Dyan Cannon	France; Italy	
Confessions of a Police Captain	Damiano Damiani	Franco Nero, Martin Balsam, Marilù Tolo	Italy	Crime thriller
Dirty Harry	Don Siegel	Clint Eastwood, Harry Guardino, Reni Santoni	United States	
The French Connection	William Friedkin	Gene Hackman, Fernando Rey, Roy Scheider	United States	
Get Carter	Mike Hodges	Michael Caine, Ian Hendry, Britt Ekland	United Kingdom	
Il était une fois un Flic	Georges Lautner	Michel Constantin, Daniel Ivernel, Mireille Darc	France; Italy	Crime comedy
Just Before Nightfall	Claude Chabrol	Michel Bouquet, Stéphane Audran, François Périer	France; Italy	Crime drama
Klute	Alan J. Pakula	Jane Fonda, Donald Sutherland, Charles Cioffi	United States	Crime thriller
Live Today, Die Tomorrow!	Kaneto Shindo		Japan	
Milano calibro 9	Fernando di Leo	Mario Adorf, Philippe Leroy, Gastone Moschin	Italy	
Play Misty for Me	Clint Eastwood	Clint Eastwood, Jessica Walter, Donna Mills	United States	Crime thriller
Sympathy for the Underdog	Kinji Fukasaku	Noboru Ando, Tomisaburo Wakayama	Japan	
Ten Days' Wonder	Claude Chabrol	Orson Welles, Anthony Perkins, Marlène Jobert	France; Italy	
Villain	Michael Tuchner	Richard Burton, Ian McShane, Nigel Davenport	United Kingdom	Gangster film
1972
1931: Once Upon a Time in New York	Luigi Vanzi	Richard Conte, Adolfo Celi	Italy	
Across 110th Street	Barry Shear	Anthony Quinn, Yaphet Kotto, Anthony Franciosa	United States	
And Hope to Die	René Clément	Jean-Louis Trintignant, Robert Ryan, Lea Massari	France, Italy	
The Big Bird Cage	Jack Hill	Teda Bracci, Vic Díaz, Anitra Ford	United States	
Boxcar Bertha	Martin Scorsese	Barbara Hershey, David Carradine, Barry Primus	United States	
The Carey Treatment	Blake Edwards	James Coburn, Jennifer O'Neill, Pat Hingle	United States	
La Course Du Lièvre à Travers les Champs	René Clément	Jean-Louis Trintignant, Robert Ryan, Lea Massari	France; United States; Italy	
The Doberman Gang	Byron Ross Chudnow	Hal Reed	United States	
Dr. Popaul	Claude Chabrol	Jean-Paul Belmondo, Mia Farrow, Laura Antonelli	France; Italy	Crime comedy
Female Convict 701: Scorpion	Shunya Itō	Meiko Kaji, Kayoko Shiraishi, Fumio Watanabe	Japan	
Female Convict Scorpion: Jailhouse 41	Shunya Itō	Meiko Kaji, Kayoko Shiraishi, Fumio Watanabe	Japan	
Un Flic	Jean-Pierre Melville	Alain Delon, Catherine Deneuve, Richard Crenna	France, Italy	
Frenzy	Alfred Hitchcock	Jon Finch, Barry Foster, Barbara Leigh-Hunt	United Kingdom	Crime thriller
The Getaway	Sam Peckinpah	Steve McQueen, Ali MacGraw, Ben Johnson	United States	
The Godfather	Francis Ford Coppola	Marlon Brando, Al Pacino, James Caan	United States	
Hammer	Bruce Clark	Al Richardson, Jamal Moore, Perrie Lott	United States	
The Harder They Come	Perry Henzell	Jimmy Cliff	Jamaica	
The Hell Below	Robert Enrico	Serge Reggiani, Juliet Berto, Jean Bouise	France	
Hickey & Boggs	Robert Culp	Robert Culp	United States	Detective Movie
The Hot Rock	Peter Yates	Robert Redford, George Segal, Ron Leibman	United States	
The Outside Man	Jacques Deray	Jean-Louis Trintignant, Ann-Margret, Roy Schneider	France, Italy, United States	
Prime Cut	Michael Ritchie	Lee Marvin, Gene Hackman, Angel Tompkins	United States	
Rika the Mixed-Blood Girl	Kō Nakahira	Rika Aoki, Yasuo Arakawa, Satoshi Moritsuka	Japan	Crime thriller
Street Mobster	Kinji Fukasaku	Noboru Ando, Asao Koike, Noboru Mitani	Japan	
Super Fly	Gordon Parks, Jr.	Ron O'Neal, Carl Lee, Sheila Frazier	United States	
Trick Baby	Larry Yust	Kiel Martin, Mel Stewart	United States	
Le Tueur	Denys de La Patellière	Jean Gabin, Fabio Testi, Uschi Glas	France, Italy, West Germany	
The Wolves	Hideo Gosha	Kyoko Enami, Hisashi Igawa, Komaki Kurihara	Japan	
1973
Badlands	Terrence Malick	Martin Sheen, Sissy Spacek, Warren Oates	United States	
Battles Without Honor and Humanity	Kinji Fukasaku	Bunta Sugawara, Hiroki Matsukata	Japan	
Battles Without Honor and Humanity: Hiroshima Deathmatch	Kinji Fukasaku	Sonny Chiba, Seizo Fukumoto, Meiko Kaji	Japan	
Battles Without Honor and Humanity: Proxy War	Kinji Fukasaku	Reiko Ike, Akira Kobayashi	Japan	
Black Caesar	Larry Cohen	Omer Jeffrey, Fred Williamson, William Wellman, Jr.	United States; Italy	
Charley Varrick	Don Siegel	Walter Matthau, Joe Don Baker, Felicia Farr	United States	
Coffy	Jack Hill	Pam Grier, Booker Bradshaw, Robert DoQui	United States	Crime thriller
The Daring Dobermans	Byron Ross Chudnow	Joan Caulfield, Tim Considine, Claudio Martinez	United States	
Dillinger	John Milius	Warren Oates, Ben Johnson, Michelle Phillips	United States	
Female Convict Scorpion: Grudge Song	Shunya Itō	Meiko Kaji, Yaoi Watanab	Japan	
Female Prisoner Scorpion: Beast Stable	Shunya Itō	Meiko Kaji	Japan	
The Friends of Eddie Coyle	Peter Yates	Robert Mitchum, Peter Boyle, Richard Jordan	United States	
Lady Snowblood	Toshiya Fujita	Meiko Kaji	Japan	
Little Cigars	Chris Christenberry	Angel Tompkins, Felix Silla, Jerry Maren	United States	Crime drama
The Mack	Michael I. Campus	Max Julien, Richard Pryor, Don Gordon	United States	
Mean Streets	Martin Scorsese	Robert De Niro, Harvey Keitel, David Proval	United States	
Night Watch	Brian G. Hutton	Elizabeth Taylor, Laurence Harvey, Billie Whitelaw	United Kingdom	
Les noces rouges	Claude Chabrol	Stéphane Audran, Michel Piccoli, Claude Piéplu	France; Italy	
The Outfit	John Flynn	Robert Duvall, Karen Black, Joe Don Baker	United States	
Paño verde	Mario David	Carlos Estrada, Luis Brandoni, Julia von Grolman, Héctor Alterio	Argentina	
Serpico	Sidney Lumet	Al Pacino, John Randolph, Jack Kehoe, Biff McGuire, Tony Roberts, Allan Rich, Albert Henderson, Joseph Bova, M. Emmet Walsh	United States	Crime Drama
Steelyard Blues	Alan Myerson	Jane Fonda, Donald Sutherland, Peter Boyle	United States	Caper
The Sting	George Roy Hill	Paul Newman, Robert Redford, Robert Shaw, Charles Durning	United States	
Superfly T.N.T.	Ron O'Neal	Silvio Nardo, Rik Boyd	United States	
The Thief Who Came to Dinner	Bud Yorkin	Ryan O'Neal, Jacqueline Bisset, Warren Oates	United States	Crime comedy
1974
11 Harrowhouse	Aram Avakian	Charles Grodin, Candice Bergen, John Gielgud	United Kingdom	Crime comedy
Almost Human	Umberto Lenzi	Henry Silva, Anita Strindberg, Raymond Lovelock	Italy	
Big Bad Mama	Steve Carver	Angie Dickinson, William Shatner, Tom Skerritt	United States	
The Black Godfather	John Evans	Don Chastain, Damu King, Rod Perry	United States	
Black Samson	Chuck Bail	Rockne Tarkington, Carol Speed, William Smith	United States	
Borsalino & Co.	Jacques Deray	Alain Delon, Riccardo Cucciolla, Catherine Rouvel	France; Italy; West Germany	
Caged Heat	Jonathan Demme	Barbara Steele, Erica Gavin, Juanita Brown	United States	
The Candy Snatchers	Guerdon Trueblood	Tiffany Bolling, Dolores Dorn, Vincent Martorano	United States	
Death Wish	Michael Winner	Charles Bronson, Hope Lange, Vincent Gardenia	United States	
Foxy Brown	Jack Hill	Pam Grier, Antonio Fargas, Peter Brown	United States	
The Godfather Part II	Francis Ford Coppola	Al Pacino, Robert Duvall, Diane Keaton	United States	
Gone in 60 Seconds	H. B. Halicki	Hal McClain, Markos Kotsikos, Jonathan E. Fricke	United States	
McQ	John Sturges	John Wayne, Eddie Albert, Diana Muldaur	United States	
Murder on the Orient Express	Sidney Lumet	Albert Finney, Sean Connery, Anthony Perkins	United Kingdom	Mystery film
The Nickel Ride	Robert Mulligan	Jason Miller, Linda Haynes, John Hillerman	United States	
Nuits rouges	Georges Franju	Gayle Hunnicutt, Jacques Champreu, Josephine Chaplin	France; Italy	
Rabid Dogs	Lamberto Bava, Mario Bava	Riccardo Cucciolla, Lea Lander, Maurice Poli	Italy	
The Sugarland Express	Steven Spielberg	Goldie Hawn, William Atherton, Ben Johnson, Michael Sacks, Gregory Walcott, Steve Kanaly	United States	
The Taking of Pelham One Two Three	Joseph Sargent	Walter Matthau, Robert Shaw, Martin Balsam	United States	
Thieves Like Us	Robert Altman	Keith Carradine, Shelley Duvall, John Schuck	United States	
Le Trio Infernal	Francis Girod	Romy Schneider, Michel Piccoli, Mascha Gonska	France; West Germany; Italy	
Uomini duri	Duccio Tessari	Lino Ventura, Isaac Hayes, Fred Williamson	Italy; France	
1975
L'Agression	Gérard Pirès	Jean-Louis Trintignant, Catherine Deneuve, Claude Brasseur	France; Italy	
The Black Bird	David Giler	George Segal, Stéphane Audran, Lionel Stander	United States	Crime comedy
Capone	Steve Carver	Ben Gazzara, Susan Blakely, Harry Guardino	United States	
The Candy Tangerine Man	Matt Climber	John Daniels, Eli Haines, Tom Hankason	United States	
Dog Day Afternoon	Sidney Lumet	Al Pacino, John Cazale, Charles Durning	United States	
Female Trouble	John Waters	Divine, David Lochary, Mary Vivian Pearce	United States	Crime comedy
Flic Story	Jacques Deray	Alain Delon, Jean-Louis Trintignant, Renato Salvatori	France; Italy	Crime thriller
The Fortune	Mike Nichols	Jack Nicholson, Warren Beatty, Stockard Channing	United States	Crime comedyr
French Connection II	John Frankenheimer	Gene Hackman, Fernando Rey, Bernard Fresson	United States	
Il faut vivre dangereusement	Claude Makovski	Claude Brasseur, Annie Girardot, Sydne Rome	France	
Les Innocents aux mains sales	Claude Chabrol	Rod Steiger, Romy Schneider, Paolo Giusti	France; West Germany; Italy	Crime thriller
Johnny Firecloud	William Allen Castleman	Victor Mojica, Frank de Kova	United States	
Lepke	Menahem Golan	Tony Curtis, Anjanette Comer, Michael Callan	United States; Israel	
A Matter of Wife... and Death	Marvin J. Chomsky	Rod Taylor, Joe Santos, Eddie Firestone	United States	
Mitchell	Andrew V. McLaglen	Joe Don Baker, Martin Balsam, John Saxo	United States	
Switchblade Sisters	Jack Hill	Bill Adler, Asher Brauner, Kitty Bruce	United States	
Wanted: Babysitter	René Clément	Maria Schneider, Sydne Rome, Robert Vaughn	West Germany; Italy; France; Monaco	
The Yakuza	Sydney Pollack	Robert Mitchum, Ken Takakura, Brian Keith	United States; Japan	
1976
The Hunter Will Get You	Philippe Labro	Jean-Paul Belmondo, Bruno Cremer, Patrick Fierry	France	Crime thriller
Barocco	André Téchiné	Isabelle Adjani, Gérard Depardieu, Marie-France Pisier	France	Crime drama
Bugsy Malone	Alan Parker	Scott Baio, Jodie Foster	United Kingdom	Gangster film
The Con Artists	Sergio Corbucci	Anthony Quinn, Adriano Celentano, Capucine	Italy	Crime comedy
Cop	Anders Refn	Jens Okking, Dick Kaysoe, Bodil Kjer	Denmark	
Le Corps de mon ennemi	Henri Verneuil	Jean-Paul Belmondo, Bernard Blier, Marie-France Pisier	France	
Ghost Train International	Bent Christensen	Dirch Passer, Preben Kaas, Axel Strøbye	Denmark	
The Killer Inside Me	Burt Kennedy	Stacy Keach, Susan Tyrrell, Tisha Sterling	United States	
The Killing of a Chinese Bookie	John Cassavetes	Ben Gazzara, Timothy Carey, Azizi Johari	United States	
Massacre at Central High	Rene Daalder	Kimberly Beck	United States	
Mikey and Nicky	Elaine May	Peter Falk, John Cassavetes, Ned Beatty	United States	
Police Python 357	Alain Corneau	Yves Montand, Simone Signoret, Mathieu Carrière	France	
1977
The American Friend	Wim Wenders	Dennis Hopper, Bruno Ganz, Lisa Kreuzer	West Germany; France	Crime drama
Fun with Dick and Jane	Ted Kotcheff	George Segal, Jane Fonda, Ed McMahon	United States	Crime comedy
Le Gang	Jacques Deray	Alain Delon, Roland Bertin, Nicole Calfan	France; Italy	
Hitch-Hike	Pasquale Festa Campanile	Corinne Cléry, David Hess, John Loffredo	Italy	
A Piece of the Action	Sidney Poitier	Hope Clarke, Bill Cosby, Ja'net Dubois	United States	Crime comedy
Tomorrow Never Comes	Peter Collinson	Oliver Reed, Susan George, Raymond Burr	United Kingdom; Canada	
1978
Blue Collar	Paul Schrader	Richard Pryor, Harvey Keitel, Yaphet Kotto	United States	Crime drama
The Cheap Detective	Robert Moore	Peter Falk, Ann-Margret, Eileen Brennan	United States	Crime comedy
The Driver	Walter Hill	Ryan O'Neal, Bruce Dern, Isabelle Adjani	United States	
Harry and Walter Go to New York	Mark Rydell	James Caan, Elliott Gould, Michael Caine	United States	Crime comedy
Mort d'un Pourri	Georges Lautner	Alain Delon, Ornella Muti, Stéphane Audran	France	
Rockers	Ted Bafaloukos	Leroy Wallace, Richard Hall, Monica Craig	Jamaica; United States	Crime drama
The Silent Partner	Daryl Duke	Susannah York, Christopher Plummer, Elliott Gould	Canada	
Violette Nozière	Claude Chabrol	Isabelle Huppert, Jean Carmet, Stéphane Audran	United States; France	Crime drama
Who'll Stop the Rain?	Karel Reisz	Nick Nolte, Tuesday Weld, Michael Moriarty	United States	
1979
10 Violent Women	Ted V. Mikels	Sherri Vernon, Dixie Lauren, Georgia Morgan	United States	
Buffet froid	Bertrand Blier	Gérard Depardieu, Bernard Blier, Jean Carmet	France	Crime comedy
The First Great Train Robbery	Michael Crichton	Sean Connery, Donald Sutherland, Lesley-Anne Down	United Kingdom	
Going in Style	Martin Brest	George Burns, Art Carney, Lee Strasberg	United States	
The Great Riviera Bank Robbery	Lawrence D. Foldes, Francis Megahy	Kevin Brennan, Warren Clarke	United States	
The Lady in Red	Lewis Teague	Pamela Sue Martin, Robert Conrad, Louise Fletcher	United States	
A Man, a Woman, and a Bank	Noel Black	Donald Sutherland, Brooke Adams, Paul Mazursky	Canada	
A Nightingale Sang in Berkeley Square	Ralph Thomas	David Niven, Richard Jordan, Gloria Grahame	United States	
The Onion Field	Harold Becker	John Savage, James Woods, Ted Danson	United States	Crime drama
Over the Edge	Jonathan Kaplan	Matt Dillon, Michael Kramer, Pamela Ludwig	United States	Juvenile delinquency film
Saturday, Sunday and Friday	Pasquale Festa Campanile, Franco Castellano, Sergio Martino, Pipolo		Italy; Spain	Crime comedy
Série Noire	Alain Corneau	Patrick Dewaere, Myriam Boyer, Bernard Blier	France	
Vengeance Is Mine	Shōhei Imamura	Ken Ogata, Rentarō Mikuni, Chocho Miyako	Japan	

== Notes ==
=== Sources ===
- Curti, Roberto; Lafond, Frank (2026). French Thrillers of the 1970s: Volume I, Crime Films. Jefferson, North Carolina: McFarland & Company. ISBN 978-1-4766-8681-3. LCCN 2025048366.
