= Rod Perry =

Rod Perry may refer to:

- Rod Perry (American football) (born 1953), American football coach and player
- Rod Perry (actor) (1934–2020), American actor

== See also ==
- Rodney Perry (born 1970), American comedian, actor and writer
