= Female Convict Scorpion: Beast Stable =

Female Prisoner Scorpion: Beast Stable
- Theatrical release poster
- Directed by: Shunya Itō
- Written by: Hiro Matsuda
- Based on: Scorpion by Tōru Shinohara
- Produced by: Kineo Yoshimine
- Starring: Meiko Kaji; Mikio Narita; Koji Nanbara; Reisen Lee
- Cinematography: Masao Shimizu
- Edited by: Osamu Tanaka
- Music by: Shunsuke Kikuchi
- Production company: Toei Company
- Release date: July 29, 1973 (Japan)
- Running time: 87 minutes
- Country: Japan
- Language: Japanese

Female Prisoner Scorpion: Beast Stable (Japanese: 女囚さそり けもの部屋, Hepburn: Joshū Sasori Kemonobeya) is a Japanese film made by Toei Company in 1973. It is the third in the Female Prisoner Scorpion series, following Female Prisoner #701: Scorpion and Female Prisoner Scorpion: Jailhouse 41 (both 1972). The star (Meiko Kaji) and director (Shunya Itō) were paired in all three.

== Plot ==
Matsushima, on the run after her escape from prison, is pursued onto a subway train by two police detectives, but escapes after stabbing one and cutting off the other's arm with her knife. She is found by Yuki, a young woman who works as a prostitute to survive after her older brother, with whom she is in a sexual relationship, was left mute and brain-damaged by a factory accident. Yuki helps Matsushima evade capture and shows her kindness, and the two develop somewhat of a friendship.

Matsushima finds an apartment and a job as a seamstress, but is targeted by Tanida, a subordinate of a pimp named Kenji Samejima who controls the area's sex trade with his wife Katsu. Tanida threatens to turn Matsushima in to the police unless she becomes his woman. Matsushima seemingly agrees, but secretly phones Tanida's lover Yae and tells her she is about to "lose her man." Yae's intended ambush of Matsushima kills Tanida instead. The Samejimas' men abduct Matsushima and bring her before Kenji and Katsu, who recognizes Matsushima as a fellow inmate from her own time in prison. She imprisons Matsushima in her cage of pet ravens.

Matsushima witnesses the Samejimas' brutality toward the women selling sex on their turf. Shinobu, a pregnant worker at the brothel, is forced by Katsu to have an abortion against her will and dumped, wailing and covered in blood, in a cell next to Matsushima. When Matsushima grasps Shinobu's hand through the bars to comfort her, she finds Shinobu still gripping a scalpel from the clinic. Yuki, who is pregnant by her brother and considering termination, is abducted from the same clinic and brought before Katsu, who beats her and rapes her with a golf club for not paying protection money. Using the scalpel, Matsushima escapes the cage and kills first the clinic doctor, then the gangsters.

Kondo, the detective whose arm Matsushima cut off, tracks her to the Samejimas and warns them she will come for them next if they do not help him capture her. Terrified, Katsu turns herself in to the police for forcing women into prostitution, preferring prison to death at Matsushima's hands. Matsushima pushes Kenji out of a window to his death and flees Kondo's dragnet into the sewer.

Yuki discovers Matsushima's hiding place and helps her survive for a week, giving her food and matches for warmth by dropping them through manhole covers. However, Yuki is discovered by Kondo's men, who threaten her brother's safety and force her to lure Matsushima out of hiding. The police flood the sewer with gasoline and set it on fire. Matsushima evades the flames underwater.

Katsu's prison cell block gets a new inmate: Matsushima, who has turned herself in for arson. Katsu, slowly going mad from fear of Matsushima and guilt over the women she abused, begins seeing Matsushima everywhere. She attacks who she thinks is Matsushima outside her cell door with a garotte, but it is really Kondo. The real Matsushima looks on from down the corridor as Kondo is slowly strangled.

A postscript states that Matsushima was released ten days later after her arson sentence was served, and no one ever knew what became of her after that.

== Cast ==
- Meiko Kaji as Nami Matsushima, the Scorpion
- Yayoi Watanabe as Yuki Nakagawa
- Mikio Narita as Detective Kondo
- Reisen Lee as Katsu Samejima
- Kōji Nanbara as Kenji Samejima
- Taro Jin as Masao Nakagawa
- Takashi Fujiki as Tanida
- Tomoko Mayama as Yae
- Mitsuru Mori as Shinobu

== Release ==
Female Prisoner Scorpion: Beast Stable was released in Japan on 29 July 1973.

== Sources ==
- Carrozza, Jules (2007). "Female Prisoner Scorpion: Beast Stable (1973)". Panik House Entertainment. Archived from the original on December 16, 2008.
- Itō, Shunya (2006). Female prisoner #701 Scorpion Collection (in Japanese and English). Tokyo Shock. ISBN 1-59883-090-2.
- 女囚さそり けもの部屋 (Joshū Sasori - Kemono Beya) (in Japanese). Japanese Movie Database.
- Thompson, Nathaniel (2006). DVD Delirium: The International Guide to Weird and Wonderful Films on DVD. Vol. 3. Godalming, England: FAB Press. pp. 211–212. ISBN 1-903254-40-X.
