= Sasori =

Sasori (Japanese for scorpion) may refer to:

- Sasori, the main character of the 1972 Japanese film Female Prisoner 701: Scorpion (Joshū Nana-maru-ichi Gō / Sasori) and its sequels
- Sasori, a character in the Naruto universe

== See also ==
- Sasori-gatame, a professional wrestling hold
