= Tony Burton =

American boxer and actor (1937–2016)

- Born: Anthony Mabron Burton; March 23, 1937; Flint, Michigan, U.S.
- Died: February 26, 2016 (aged 78); Menifee, California, U.S.
- Education: Flint Northern High School
- Occupations: Actor; boxer
- Years active: 1957–2007
- Spouse: Aurelain Burton (m. 1980)
- Children: 3
- Boxing career
- Height: 6 ft 0 in (183 cm)
- Weight: Heavyweight
- Stance: Orthodox

Boxing record
- Total fights: 14
- Wins: 10
- Win by KO: 2
- Losses: 3
- Draws: 1

Anthony Mabron Burton (March 23, 1937 – February 26, 2016) was an American actor and professional boxer. He was best known for his role as trainer Tony "Duke" Evers in the Rocky films.

== Early life ==
Burton was born in Flint, Michigan. He had a younger sister named Loretta. A Flint Northern High School graduate, he was a Michigan Golden Gloves heavyweight boxing champion and two-time all-state football player.

At Northern, he played halfback. In 1954, he scored 13 touchdowns and led his team in scoring. Many of his scoring runs were of 50 yards or more. He gained 820 yards rushing that year, and one of his runs was for 95 yards. That same year, he was selected to the first teams of the All City and All Valley teams as a halfback. He was also chosen as an All State honorable mention. He was the team's co-captain and Most Valuable Player. Burton led his team in yards gained and receiving yards. In one game against Grand Rapids Catholic, he gained 213 total yards. At Northern, Burton was also the leading baseball pitcher, pitching the team to the city championship title.

== Boxing career ==
Burton's boxing career included the Flint Golden Gloves light heavyweight championship in 1955 and 1957. Burton won the State Golden Gloves Light Heavyweight Championship in 1957 and lost in the Chicago Tournament of Champions semi-finals.

He made his professional debut in January 1958 against Bob Smith at the Hollywood Legion Stadium. Burton fought in a total of 14 professional bouts between 1958 and 1959. His final fight was a defeat against knockout artist Lamar Clark, who holds the record for most consecutive knockouts at 44. His final record was 10 wins (2 by knockout), 3 losses (all by knockout), and 1 draw.

== Acting career ==
After prison, Burton began finding work with small theater companies in and around Los Angeles, garnering favorable notices early on.

A life member of the Actors Studio, Burton numbers among his many credits a co-starring role in Frank's Place and parts in films, such as Stir Crazy and The Toy. He also appeared as Wells, one of the prisoners trapped in the besieged police station in John Carpenter's 1976 Howard Hawks-inspired action film Assault on Precinct 13. He later starred in the Rocky films as a trainer to Apollo Creed (Carl Weathers) and later Rocky Balboa (Sylvester Stallone). He appeared in an episode of Gibbsville in 1976. Burton also appeared in The Shining, House Party 2, and Hook. He had guest appearances in Kojak, The Rockford Files, CHiPs, Twin Peaks, and The A-Team. Burton also guest starred as Conrad King Baylor on In the Heat of the Night in the episode "King's Ransom," which aired in January 1990.

== Recognition ==
In 1993, Burton was inducted into the Greater Flint Afro-American Sports Hall of Fame.

== Personal life ==
Burton resided in California for 30 years. He attended Immanuel Baptist Church in Highland, California. He was married to Aurelain (Rae) from 1980 until his death. Tony has a daughter, Juanita Burton, and two sons, Jomo and Martin Burton. Martin died of a heart attack at the age of 43 on May 8, 2014. He also has a step daughter, Christal Becton (married name), who Aurelian had in a previous marriage.

Burton was a talented chess player. There is a brief scene of him playing chess with a Russian in the film Rocky IV. He defeated Stanley Kubrick on the set of The Shining, in which Burton played Larry Durkin, the garage owner. Speaking with Kubrick biographer Vincent LoBrutto, Burton recalled his first day on the set:

My contract was for a week. I just had two short scenes in the movie. I stayed for six weeks because Stanley and I were playing chess... Stanley was a stronger player than I but I was strong enough to give him sufficient struggle to where he enjoyed it. I beat him in the first or second game we played, and then I didn't win any more after that, but it was always a tight struggle. That's what he loved; I guess there was no one else around that played strong.

=== Incarceration ===
After his brief professional boxing career, Burton served more than three years in a Chino, California prison for robbery. The acting exercises he performed as part of a therapy program helped steer him into an acting career after his release. NEA's Frank Sanello in March 1988:

Prison for me was productive because I got my high school diploma and a degree from the University of California. But most important, I got myself together and found out who I was and how I could proceed without destroying myself.

More specifically, one of the skills acquired at Chino landed Burton his wife Rae, who he met on a TV-repair house call. Moreover, a workshop in the prison that used psychodrama as a form of therapy pointed Burton toward his acting career, when an emotional breakthrough achieved by one of his partners in an acting exercise dramatically demonstrated theater's potential power.

== Death ==
Burton had been frequently hospitalized for the last year of his life, according to his sister. On February 26, 2016, he died at the age of 78, from complications of pneumonia at a hospital in Menifee.

== Professional boxing record ==
| 14 fights | 10 wins | 3 losses |
|---|---|---|
| By knockout | 2 | 3 |
| By decision | 8 | 0 |
| Draws | 1 | |

| No. | Result | Record | Opponent | Type | Round, time | Date | Location | Notes |
|---|---|---|---|---|---|---|---|---|
| 14 | Loss | 10–3–1 | LaMar Clark | KO | 4 (6) | Apr 4, 1959 | Polo Grounds, Palm Springs, California, U.S. | |
| 13 | Loss | 10–2–1 | Bobby Sands | KO | 4 (6) | Feb 21, 1959 | Legion Stadium, Los Angeles, California, U.S. | |
| 12 | Win | 10–1–1 | Clyde Watson | SD | 6 | Dec 2, 1958 | National Guard Armory, Las Vegas, Nevada, U.S. | |
| 11 | Win | 9–1–1 | Frankie Haynes | MD | 6 | Aug 11, 1958 | Cashman Field, Las Vegas, Nevada, U.S. | |
| 10 | Win | 8–1–1 | Geno Duncan | UD | 4 | Jun 23, 1958 | Cashman Field, Las Vegas, Nevada, U.S. | |
| 9 | Win | 7–1–1 | Dennis Chaney | KO | 2 (4) | Jun 14, 1958 | Legion Stadium, Los Angeles, California, U.S. | |
| 8 | Win | 6–1–1 | Dennis Chaney | PTS | 6 | May 19, 1958 | Cashman Field, Las Vegas, Nevada, U.S. | |
| 7 | Win | 5–1–1 | Chuck Wilburn | PTS | 4 | Apr 7, 1958 | Bakersfield Dome, Bakersfield, California, U.S. | |
| 6 | Win | 4–1–1 | Clyde Hodges | UD | 4 | Mar 17, 1958 | Silver Slipper, Las Vegas, Nevada, U.S. | |
| 5 | Loss | 3–1–1 | Curley Lee | KO | 4 (4) | Feb 8, 1958 | Legion Stadium, Los Angeles, California, U.S. | |
| 4 | Win | 3–0–1 | Chuck Wilburn | PTS | 4 | Jan 30, 1958 | Olympic Auditorium, Los Angeles, California, U.S. | |
| 3 | Draw | 2–0–1 | Chuck Wilburn | PTS | 4 | Jan 28, 1958 | Arena, San Bernardino, California, U.S. | |
| 2 | Win | 2–0 | Chuck Wilburn | PTS | 4 | Jan 20, 1958 | Silver Slipper, Las Vegas, Nevada, U.S. | |
| 1 | Win | 1–0 | Bob Smith | KO | 4 (4) | Jan 4, 1958 | Legion Stadium, Los Angeles, California, U.S. | |

== Filmography ==
=== Film ===
| Year | Title | Role | Notes | Ref. |
|---|---|---|---|---|
| 1974 | The Black Godfather | Sonny Spyder Brown | | |
| 1976 | The River Niger | Black Policeman | | |
| 1976 | Trackdown | Zelds | | |
| 1976 | The Bingo Long Traveling All-Stars & Motor Kings | Issac | | |
| 1976 | Assault on Precinct 13 | Wells | | |
| 1976 | Rocky | Tony "Duke" Evers | | |
| 1977 | Heroes | Chef | | |
| 1978 | Blackjack | Charles | | |
| 1979 | Rocky II | Tony "Duke" Evers | | |
| 1980 | The Shining | Larry Durkin | Scenes not in European cut. | |
| 1980 | The Hunter | Garbageman #2 | | |
| 1980 | Stir Crazy | Guy Who Punches Big Mean | | |
| 1980 | Inside Moves | Lucius | | |
| 1982 | Rocky III | Tony "Duke" Evers | | |
| 1982 | The Toy | Stanley | | |
| 1985 | Beyond Reason | Dangerman | Filmed in 1977. | |
| 1985 | Rocky IV | Tony "Duke" Evers | | |
| 1986 | Armed and Dangerous | Cappy | | |
| 1990 | Side Out | Louie | | |
| 1990 | Rocky V | Tony "Duke" Evers | | |
| 1991 | House Party 2 | Mr. Lee | | |
| 1991 | Hook | Bill Jukes | | |
| 1992 | Mission of Justice | Cedric Williams | | |
| 1995 | Fatal Choice | Columbus | | |
| 1995 | Cyber Track 2 | Swain | | |
| 1996 | Flipping | Chuckie | | |
| 1996 | Black Rose of Harlem | Turner | | |
| 1997 | Me and the Gods | | | |
| 2000 | Knockout | Sergent Hawkins | | |
| 2003 | Shade | Fedora | | |
| 2003 | Exorcism | Bishop Harris | | |
| 2006 | Rocky Balboa | Tony "Duke" Evers | | |
| 2007 | Hack! | Sheriff Stoker | | |

=== Television ===
| Year | Title | Role | Notes |
|---|---|---|---|
| 1974 | Kojak | Eddie Ellis | Episode: "The Betrayal" (Season 2: Episode 14) |
| 1975 | The Invisible Man | 3rd Prisoner | Episode: "Go Directly To Jail" (Season 1: Episode 7) |
| 1975 | Baretta | Teak | Episode: "Count the Days I'm Gone" (Season 2: Episode 12) |
| 1976 | Harry O | Peter Macklin | Episode: "Ruby" (Season 2: Episode 20) |
| 1976 | Future Cop | Terrorist #2 | Episode: "Future Cop (Pilot)" (Season 1: Episode 1) |
| 1976 | Gemini Man | 'Biggie' Moore | Episode: "8, 9, 10...You're Dead" (Season 1: Episode 9); Unaired |
| 1976 | Good Times | Aide | Episode: "Evans Versus Davis" (Season 4: Episode 6) |
| 1976 | Gibbsville | Guest | Episode: "All the Young Girls" (Season 1: Episode 5) |
| 1977 | Switch | Joey | Episode: "The Snitch" (Season 2: Episode 14) |
| 1977 | The Six Million Dollar Man | Manager | Episode: "The Infiltrators" (Season 4: Episode 18) |
| 1977 | Sanford and Son | Guard | Episode: "Fred the Activist" (Season 6: Episode 21) |
| 1977 | The Rockford Files | Joe Moran | Episode: "Second Chance" (Season 4: Episode 4) |
| 1978 | The Hardy Boys/Nancy Drew Mysteries | Gilmore Lee | Episode: "The Lady on Thursday at Ten" |
| 1978 | C.P.O. Sharkey | Scotty | Episode: "Tell It to the Marines" (Season 2: Episode 15) |
| 1979 | The Incredible Hulk | Taylor George | Episode: "Like a Brother" (Season 2: Episode 14) |
| 1980 | Tenspeed and Brown Shoe | Skeeter McClintock | Episode: "Savage Says 'There's No Free Lunch'" (Season 1: Episode 3) |
| 1981 | Fitz and Bones | Sid | Episode: "Terror at Newsline 3 (Pilot)" (Season 1: Episode 1) |
| 1981 | The Greatest American Hero | 'Curley' | Episode: "Hog Wild" (Season 2: Episode 4) |
| 1981 | CHiPs | Avrom | Episode: "Mitchell & Woods" (Season 5: Episode 12) |
| 1981 | Quincy, M.E. | Marvin 'Starvin' Marvin' | Episode: "Dead Stop" (Season 7: Episode 8) |
| 1982 | The Fall Guy | Algebra Jones | Episode: "Ladies On the Ropes" (Season 1: Episode 16) |
| 1982 | Bret Maverick | Arthur | Episodes: "Faith, Hope And Clarity, part 1" (Season 1: Episode 14); "Faith, Hope And Clarity, part 2" (Season 1: Episode 15) |
| 1982 | T.J. Hooker | Luther Travis | Episode: "Blind Justice (a.k.a. Blind Watch)" (Season 2: Episode 4) |
| 1984 | The A-Team | Burke | Episode: "It's a Desert Out There" (Season 2: Episode 18) |
| 1985 | Moonlighting | Bartender | Episode: "Gunfight at the So-So Corral" (Season 1: Episode 3) |
| 1986 | Airwolf | 'Moose' | Episode: "Wildfire" (Season 3: Episode 3) |
| 1986 | The Fall Guy | Eddie Barber | Episode: "The Bigger They Are" (Season 5: Episode 22) |
| 1987 | Walt Disney's Wonderful World of Color | Moustache | Episode: "You Ruined My Life" |
| 1987 | The Law & Harry McGraw | Leah | Episode: "Solve It Again, Harry" |
| 1987–1988 | Frank's Place | Arthur 'Big Arthur' | Contract role |
| 1988 | The Wil Shriner Show | Himself | Episode: "March 18, 1988" (Season 1: Episode 120) |
| 1988 | Police Story | Henry | Episode: "The Cop Killers" (Season 6: Episode 1) |
| 1989 | Amen | Officer Anderson | Episode: "TV or Not TV" (Season 4: Episode 7) |
| 1990 | In the Heat of the Night | Conrad Baylor | Episode: "King's Ransom" (Season 3: Episode 10) |
| 1990 | A Different World | 'Cap' Connors | Episode: "A Campfire Story" (Season 3: Episode 18) |
| 1990 | Over My Dead Body | 'Curly' | Episode: "Dad and Buried" (Season 1: Episode 4) |
| 1991 | Twin Peaks | Colonel Riley | Episode: "Episode Nineteen 'The Black Widow'" (Season 2: Episode 12) |
| 1991 | Adam-12 | Guest | Episode: "The Fighter" (Season 2: Episode 26) |
| 1996 | NYPD Blue | Floyd 'Good News' Gates | Episode: "Burnin' Love" (Season 3: Episode 11) |
| 1996 | Poltergeist: The Legacy | Simon Walters | Episode: "The Inheritance" (Season 1: Episode 19) |
| 1996 | Chicago Hope | Dr. Joseph Little | Episode: "Divided Loyalty" (Season 3: Episode 9) |
| 1998 | The Magnificent Seven | 'Tennessee' Eban | Episode: "Pilot" (Season 1: Episode 1) |
| 2001 | The Lot | Jerome Jeter | Episode: "Nebraska Johnston" (Season 2: Episode 6) |
| 2003 | Exorcism | Bishop Harris | Made-for-TV-movie, directed and written by William A. Baker. |
| 2011 | Biography | Himself / Tony 'Duke' Evers | Episode: "The Rocky Saga: Going the Distance" |
