= Blackjack (1978 film) =

1978 American crime drama film

- Directed by: John Evans
- Written by: John Evans
- Story by: John Evans
- Produced by: John Evans
- Starring: William Smith; Tony Burton; Paris Earl; Damu King; Diane Sommerfield; Angela May; Tom Scott
- Cinematography: Jack Steely
- Edited by: Nino De Marco
- Music by: Jack Ashford
- Production company: Blackjack Productions
- Distributed by: S.E.S. Releasing
- Release date: November 17, 1978
- Running time: 104 Minutes
- Country: United States
- Language: English

Blackjack is a 1978 American crime drama film written, produced and directed by John Evans and starring William Smith, Tony Burton, Paris Earl, Damu King, Diane Sommerfield, Angela May, and Tom Scott

== Premise ==
Roy, the leader of a group of criminals, is released from prison and launches a big plan to rob the Mafia-controlled casinos in Las Vegas. Andy Mayfield, a casino boss, tries to stop them.

== Cast ==
- William Smith as Andy Mayfield (credited as Bill Smith)
- Tony Burton as Charles
- Frank Christi as Joe Greene (credited as Frank R. Christi)
- Damu King as Roy King
- Paris Earl as Ojenke
- Ernie Banks as "Turbo"
- Ted Harris as Akbar
- Tom Scott as "Teach"
- Diane Sommerfield as Nancy
- Angela May as Valery
- John Alderman as Phil Kastel
- Alan Oliney as Dealer
- Gerald White as Pit Boss
- Sandy Clory as 1st Girl
- Vicki Le Mere as 2nd Girl
