= Private Eye (TV series) =

American crime drama television series

- Genre: Crime drama
- Created by: Anthony Yerkovich
- Starring: Josh Brolin; Michael Woods; Lisa Jane Persky
- Composer: Joe Jackson
- Country of origin: United States
- Original language: English
- No. of seasons: 1
- No. of episodes: 13

Production
- Running time: 60 minutes
- Production companies: Yerkovich Productions; Universal Television

Original release
- Network: NBC
- Release: September 13, 1987 – January 8, 1988

Private Eye is an American crime drama television series created by Anthony Yerkovich that aired on NBC from September 13, 1987, until January 8, 1988.

== Premise ==
The series is about an ex-cop (Michael Woods) in 1950s L.A. He works as private eye. When he is hunting the murderer of his brother he meets a young rockabilly street hustler (Josh Brolin) who will help him and eventually becomes his pal. A secretary (Lisa Jane Persky) will join the team.

== Cast ==
- Michael Woods as Jack Cleary
- Josh Brolin as Johnny Betts
- Bill Sadler as Lt. Charlie Fontana
- Lisa Jane Persky as Dottie Dworski

== Episodes ==
No.	Title	Directed by	Written by	Original release date
1 2	"Pilot"	Mark Tinker	Anthony Yerkovich	September 13, 1987
While investing the murder of his brother, Jack Cleary stumbles upon a scandal in the record industry.
3	"Nicky the Rose"	Donald Petrie	Story by : Anthony Yerkovich & John Leekley; Teleplay by : John Leekley & Alfonse Ruggiero, Jr.	September 18, 1987
Cleary is hired to watch the unfaithful lover of an actress.
4	"War Buddy"	Rob Cohen	Story by : Anthony Yerkovich & John Leekley & Alfonse Ruggiero, Jr. Teleplay by : Alfonse Ruggiero, Jr.	September 25, 1987
Cleary's war buddy might be murdered if he doesn't take a job with a gang of mobsters.
5	"Blue Movie"	Aaron Lipstadt	Ron Hansen	October 2, 1987
Cleary investigates the disappearance of a young porn star.
6	"Blue Hotel: Part 1"	Rob Cohen	Anthony Yerkovich & John Leekley	October 16, 1987
The master of a rockabilly artist's latest album has been stolen. Johnny becomes the bodyguard for a sexy blonde. To be continued...
7	"Blue Hotel: Part 2"	Rob Cohen	Anthony Yerkovich & John Leekley	October 23, 1987
Johnny becomes involved with the ex-girlfriend of a rock-and-roller. Cleary investigates a counterfeit-record operation.
8	"Barrio Nights"	Rob Cohen	John Leekley & Alfonse Ruggiero	November 6, 1987
Johnny stumbles upon a heroin ring.
9	"Nobody Dies in Chinatown"	Paul Lynch	Story by : Anthony Yerkovich & John Leekley & Alfonse Ruggiero, Jr. Teleplay by : John Leekley & Alfonse Ruggiero, Jr.	November 13, 1987
The brother of a young woman is suspected of robbery at a Chinatown gambling den.
10	"Both Sides of the Coin"	Victor Lobl	Joseph Dougherty	November 20, 1987
Cleary reunites with his former mentor in order to work on a blackmail case.
11	"Light and Shadows"	Larry Shaw	Story by : Anthony Yerkovich & Alfonse Ruggiero, Jr. Teleplay by : John Leekley & Alfonse Ruggiero, Jr.	December 4, 1987
A black woman is being harassed by white neighbors.
12	"High Heels and Silver Wings"	Victor Lobl	Gina Wendkos	December 11, 1987
Cleary is hired by a tycoon to keep an eye on his wife. Dottie falls in love.
13	"Hollywood Confidential"	James Quinn	Joseph Dougherty	January 8, 1988
An actress turns up dead shortly after Cleary's surveillance photos of her ends up in a gossip rag.
