= Love in a Taxi =

- Directed by: Robert Sickinger
- Written by: Michael Kortchmar
- Starring: Diane Sommerfield; Jim Jacobs; Earl Monroe; Lisa Jane Persky; Malik Murray
- Release date: 1980
- Running time: 90 minutes
- Country: United States
- Language: English

Love in a Taxi is a 1980 American film starring Diane Sommerfield and Jim Jacobs.

== Plot ==
The story of a romance between a Jewish New York cab driver, Sam, and Corinne, an African-American mother and bank clerk with a young son, Davey. After Davey rides in Sam's cab one day, Davey brings Sam and Corinne together. Corinne and Sam are accidentally involved in a drug scam that could land them both in serious trouble.

== Background ==
Star Jim Jacobs had previously worked under director Robert Sickinger at the Hull House Association in Chicago during the late 1960s. Both were better known for their stage work; Jacobs' only other major contribution to film was an indirect one (writing much of the original material that was incorporated into the major hit film Grease).
