= Speeding Up Time =

1971 American action film

- Directed by: John Evans
- Screenplay by: John Evans
- Produced by: John Evans
- Starring: Winston Thrash; Pamela Donegan; Ellen Brown; Ojenke; Harry Dolan; Paris Earl; Jay Jones; Henri White; Louise Springs
- Cinematography: Villis Lapeniecks; Bob Maxwell; Mike Margulies
- Edited by: Tony Margra; Raymond Proca
- Music by: David T. Walker
- Production company: Cougnar Productions
- Release date: July 16, 1971
- Running time: 64 Minutes
- Country: United States
- Language: English

Speeding Up Time is a 1971 film written, produced and directed by John Evans and starring Winston Thrash, Pamela Donegan, and Ellen Brown

== Premise ==
A man seeks revenge on the crime boss responsible for the fire that killed his mother.
