= Diane Sommerfield =

American actress

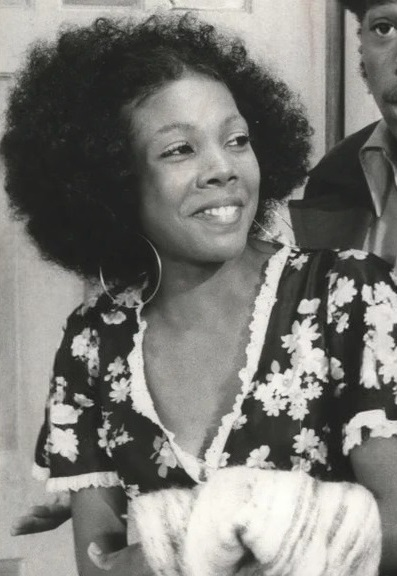
- Sommerfield in All in the Family, 1974
- Born: Diane Yvonne Young; October 24, 1949; Washington, D.C., U.S.
- Died: March 9, 2001 (aged 51); Washington, D.C., U.S.
- Other names: Diane Y. Sommerfield; Diane Summerfield
- Education: California State University
- Occupation: Actress
- Years active: 1968–1990

Diane Sommerfield (born Diane Yvonne Young; October 24, 1949 – March 9, 2001) was an American actress who made appearances in theater, film and television from the early 1970s until the mid 1980s. Sommerfield was best known for her role as Valerie Grant on NBC's soap opera Days of Our Lives (1981–82).

== Biography ==
Born Diane Yvonne Young in Washington, D.C., Sommerfield began her acting career as a child performing in plays in her hometown. Sommerfield attended Calvin Coolidge High School where she appeared in lead roles of school productions. During her early college years at Howard University, Sommerfield appeared in lead role of "Satyricon" at the Stratford Shakespeare Festival in Ontario. In her junior year of college, Sommerfield moved to Los Angeles and transferred to the California State University, Los Angeles, where she graduated with a B.A. in Theater in 1971.

From 1971 until 1986, Sommerfield appeared in multiple films and television shows. Sommerfield was better known for films such as The Black Godfather (1974), Roll, Freddy, Roll! (1974), Blackjack (1978), Love in a Taxi (1980), Back Roads (1981), and The Night Stalker (1987) Sommerfield returned to her hometown in 1986 to study film at University of the District of Columbia. Sommerfield was a volunteer acting teacher at her high school alma mater from 1997 until 1999. Sommerfield died on March 9, 2001, at age 51.
