= Meat Loaf: To Hell and Back =

2000 autobiography by Meat Loaf, with David Dalton

To Hell and Back
- Author: Meat Loaf, with David Dalton
- Language: English
- Genre: Autobiography
- Publisher: Virgin Publishing
- Publication date: 2000
- Media type: Print (Paperback)
- ISBN: 0-7535-0443-X
- OCLC: 43719861

To Hell and Back is the title of the autobiography of rock singer, Meat Loaf. It was later made into a television movie, called Meat Loaf: To Hell and Back, with W. Earl Brown in the title role.

== Autobiography ==
To Hell and Back was co-written by David Dalton and was publicized as the true story of Meat Loaf's life and career from young boy in Texas to the time of the release of his massive comeback album, Bat Out of Hell II: Back into Hell in 1993. Included in the book were references to his drunken father beating him and even trying to kill him, how he once picked up Charles Manson on a highway, how he saw John F. Kennedy land in Dallas, and—upon hearing that Kennedy had been shot—going to Parkland Hospital, seeing Jackie Kennedy coming out of the car, along with Governor John Connally, and describes his fall into alcoholism and depression after the release of the first Bat Out of Hell album in 1977. It also describes how he was in New York City when he heard the news of the death of his mother and how he scrounged money for a flight home from his fellow cast in the musical he was appearing in at the time.

== Film version ==
To Hell and Back: The Meat Loaf Story
- Directed by: Jim McBride
- Starring: W. Earl Brown
- Music by: Hummie Mann
- Original language: English

Original release
- Network: VH1
- Release: 2000

The television movie version of the book, directed by Jim McBride, is only vaguely faithful to the autobiography itself. Changes which are obvious include showing Meat Loaf as still in Texas—indeed still in high school—when his father comes in, looking sad, and he realizes that his mother has died. In addition little is made of his time between leaving Texas and meeting Jim Steinman. A large portion of the film is devoted to the attempts to get Bat Out of Hell released and Meat Loaf's alcoholism problems and legal arguments, especially with Steinman. The film ends with Meat performing a concert at a cancer charity event, which Meat agrees to attend due to the death of his mother from cancer. The song "I'd Do Anything for Love (But I Won't Do That)" is sung, initially a cappella, at the very end of the film, when in real life, at the charity, he sang "I'd Lie for You (And That's the Truth)".

=== Cast ===
Actor	Role
W. Earl Brown	Meat Loaf
Dedee Pfeiffer	Leslie Aday
Zachary Throne	Jim Steinman
Tom Wood	Kevin Frears
Lisa Jane Persky	Wilma Aday
Kim Robillard	Wes Aday
Amanda Aday	Clerk
Keith Allan (actor)	Tim Curry
Jesse Lenat	Todd Rundgren

== Trivia ==
- Amanda Aday, Meat Loaf's daughter, appears in the film as a clerk. Pearl Aday, Meat Loaf's adopted daughter (she was born to Leslie before she met Meat Loaf), did not take part in the film.
- The book continues the oft-written claim that Meat Loaf was born in 1947. However, Meat has often stated that his drivers licence and Social Security information both state that he was born in 1951.
- Although born Marvin Lee Aday, Meat Loaf changed his name legally to Michael Lee Aday. However, he has used both Marvin and Michael in the past when credited in films and television appearances. Neither full name appears in the book.
- In the VH1 movie, Mark Campbell sings Meat Loaf’s voice in an early scene. (Campbell also sang Johnny B. Goode for Michael J. Fox in Back to the Future.)
