= Lisa Jane Persky =

American actress

- Occupations: Actress; author; artist; photographer
- Years active: 1972–present
- Spouse: Andy Zax (m. 2008)
- Website: www.lisajanepersky.com

Lisa Jane Persky is an American actress, journalist, author, artist, and photographer. She played supporting roles in the films The Great Santini (1979), Peggy Sue Got Married (1986) and When Harry Met Sally... (1989), and worked in the late 1970s as a writer and photojournalist for New York Rocker magazine.

== Early life and education ==
After her parents' divorce, her father, Mordecai (Mort) Persky, married novelist Judith Rossner (Looking for Mr. Goodbar), and her mother, Jane Holley Persky, married classical violinist Vladimir Weisman. Persky grew up in New York City's Greenwich Village at 87 Christopher Street, a building known for notable tenants such as H.M. Koutoukas and Yoko Ono. She attended P.S. 41 for elementary school then the High School of Art and Design, where she studied graphic design.

== Acting ==
Immediately after she graduated from high school, Persky's neighbor Koutoukas, a playwright, told her that he had written a play for her. He cast her, with the salary of $25 per week, as "Cordelia Wells, The World's Most Perfect Teenager" in Grandmother Is in the Strawberry Patch. The play was produced at La MaMa Experimental Theatre Club, and was the first of several collaborations between Persky and Koutoukas. In 1976, she performed as Mary-Eleanor in Tom Eyen's Women Behind Bars, directed by Ron Link and starring Divine.

She has since appeared in many plays, including on Broadway in Steaming, and has received critical acclaim for her stage performances in Los Angeles. She received the Drama-Logue and LA Weekly Theater awards (for Best Actress) for Mayo Simon's These Men, in which she starred at the Los Angeles Actors Theatre Company and for Hearts on Fire at the Odyssey. She also received a Drama Critics Circle award nomination (for Outstanding Performance) for These Men.

Her breakout performance as a film actress came in 1979 playing the role of Robert Duvall's daughter in The Great Santini. She has acted in over two dozen films, including American Pop, The Cotton Club, Peggy Sue Got Married, The Big Easy, When Harry Met Sally..., and Coneheads. In her role as Katrina in Destiny Turns on the Radio (1995), she gave actor/director Quentin Tarantino his first on-screen kiss. In 2013, she appeared in I Am Divine, Jeffrey Schwarz's documentary about the actor Divine.

Persky's television work has included a recurring role on Private Eye as well as appearances on NYPD Blue, The X-Files, King of the Hill, E/R, The Golden Girls, and dozens more. She has appeared in made-for-TV movies such as Meat Loaf: To Hell and Back and KISS Meets the Phantom of the Park.

== Writing and editing ==
An early participant in the CBGB music scene, she was a founding staff member at New York Rocker magazine. During that era, she documented the burgeoning punk and new wave movement as a writer and a photojournalist. She revisited the era on the "New York Rockers" panel at the 2012 EMP Pop Conference.

As a journalist, her work has appeared in publications including Fortean Times and LA Weekly. In 2010, she became a founding editor of the Los Angeles Review of Books, where she was also art director. She left the publication in December 2012.

Her fiction has appeared, among other places, in the magazines BOMB and Eclectica (where, billed as Eljay Persky, she was one of 30 writers selected to be anthologized in its Eclectica: Best Fiction Vol. 1 collection).

== Visual art ==
In addition to her fine-art photography, her photography has been featured in magazines such as Mojo, Q, and Uncut, and in books, including Gary Valentine's memoir, New York Rocker: My Life in The Blank Generation, Punk: The Whole Story, and Lance Out Loud, to which she also contributed an essay. Her collage work has appeared in publications including the Los Angeles Times and LA Style, and it earned her an Award for Design Excellence from Print magazine. In 2008, she co-produced and curated Los Angeles Loteria; An Exploration of Identity, an edition of prints in honor of the 40th anniversary of Aardvark Letterpress. In 2012, she contributed the foreword to the catalog for photographer Bobby Grossman's exhibit Low Fidelity - The Photos of Bobby Grossman.

== Personal life and miscellaneous appearances ==
On January 19, 2008, she married Andy Zax, a music historian and former co-star of the Comedy Central game show Beat the Geeks.

Persky was the subject of "(I'm Always Touched by Your) Presence, Dear", a song by Blondie. The song was written by her then-boyfriend Gary Valentine, who was the band's bassist at the time.

In 2009, Persky began making appearances on The Best Show on WFMU radio program, as both a regular caller and as an in-studio special guest. She is also a semi-regular on the Life Elsewhere program on WMNF in Tampa, Florida.

Persky occasionally has appeared at fan conventions, including the 20th anniversary celebration for Quantum Leap and at the 2013 New York/New Jersey Kiss Expo.

== Filmography ==
=== Film ===
Year	Title	Role	Notes
1979	The Great Santini	Mary Anne Meechum	
1980	Love in a Taxi	Marian	
1981	American Pop	Bella	
1983	Breathless	Salesgirl	billed as Lisa Persky
1984	The Cotton Club	Frances Flegenheimer	
1985	The Sure Thing	Mary Ann Webster	
1986	Peggy Sue Got Married	Delores Dodge	
1987	The Big Easy	McCabe	
1989	Great Balls of Fire!	Babe	
1989	When Harry Met Sally...	Alice	
1990	In the Best Interest of the Children	Gwen Hatcher	
1990	The Last of the Finest	Harriet Gross	
1990	Vital Signs	Bobby	
1993	Coneheads	Lisa Farber	
1994	Dead Funny	Sarah	
1994	Pontiac Moon	Alicia Frank	
1995	Destiny Turns on the Radio	Katrina	
1996	Female Perversions	Margot	
1998	Where's Marlowe?	Jenny	
1999	Tumbleweeds	Diner Waitress	billed as Lisa Persky
1999	The Wetonkawa Flash		
1999	Goosed	The Psychic	
2001	My First Mister	Sheila	
2001	An American Rhapsody	Pattie	
2002	The Dogwalker	Allison	
2006	Grilled	Sally Wilson	
2013	I Am Divine	Herself	

=== Television ===
Year	Title	Role	Notes
1977	The Fitzpatricks		Episodes: "Halloween" and "The New Fitzpatrick"
1978	NBC Special Treat	Cindy	Episode: "Snowbound"
1978	KISS Meets the Phantom of the Park	Dirty Dee	Television film
1980	Shirley		Episode: "The Three Dates of Shirley Miller"
1981	ABC Afterschool Specials	Jo Dayton	Episode: "A Matter of Time"
1981	The Choice	Emmy Soames	Television film
1981	Quincy, M.E.	Penny Stone	Episode: "Sugar and Spice"
1982	The Incredible Hulk	Rita	Episode: "A Minor Problem"
1982	Open All Night	Laurie	
1982	Trapper John, M.D.	Sally	Episode: "Ladies in Waiting"
1983	Desperate Intruder	Linda	Television film
1984	E/R		Episode: "Sentimental Journey"
1984	Shattered Vows	Sister Cathy	Television film
1985	The Golden Girls	Kate Zbornak	Episode: "Guess Who's Coming to the Wedding?"
1985	Amazing Stories	Shirley	Episode: "The Main Attraction"
1985	New Love, American Style		Episode: "Love and Leaving Home"
1986	Crime Story	Joanne Goldman	Episode: "Pilot"
1986	The Twilight Zone	Sandra	Episode: "The Once and Future King"
1987-88	Private Eye	Dottie	Episodes: "Pilot," "Nickey the Rose," "War Buddy," "Blue Movie," "Blue Hotel Pt.1," "Nobody Dies in Chinatown," "Hollywood Confidential"
1988	Sharing Richard	Roberta	
1988	Thirtysomething	Sharon Berman	Episode: "Whose Forest Is This?"
1989	It's Garry Shandling's Show	Kitty	Episode: "Vegas: Part 2"
1990	Grand	Jenny	Episode: "Norris' Romance"
1991	The Antagonists	Joanie Rutledge	
1992	Designing Women	Heather McPhaul	Episode: "All About Odes to Atlanta"
1992	Mann & Machine		Episode: "Cold, Cold Heart"
1993	Murphy Brown	Jane	Episode: "Games Mothers Play"
1994	Quantum Leap	Marion	Episode: "Memphis Melody - July 3, 1954"
1995	The Marshal	Felton Voorhees	Episodes: "Twoslip" and "Pass the Gemelli"
1995	Touched by an Angel	Alison	Episode: "The Big Bang"
1997	The Pretender	Lamont	Episode: "Bomb Squad"
1998	Perfect Assassins	Janice Franklin	Television film
1999	The X-Files	Laura Weinsider	Episode: "Terms of Endearment"
1999	King of the Hill	Actress (voice)	Episode: "Love Hurts and So Does Art"
1999	Touched by an Angel	Stasi	Episode: "The Last Day of the Rest of Your Life"
2000	Meat Loaf: To Hell and Back	Wilma Aday	Television film
2002	The Practice	Karen Garvey	Episode: "The Test"
2002	The Division	Ann Fenwick	Episode: "Illusions"
2004	NYPD Blue	Jessica Applebaum	Episode: "What's Your Poison?"
2005	Invasion	Disheveled Woman	Episode: "Unnatural Selection"
2005	Twins	Marcy	Episode: "Horse Sense"
