= The Black Gestapo =

1975 American blaxploitation crime film

- Theatrical release poster
- Directed by: Lee Frost
- Screenplay by: Lee Frost; Wes Bishop
- Story by: Ronald K. Goldman; Lee Frost; Wes Bishop
- Produced by: Wes Bishop
- Starring: Rod Perry; Charles P. Robinson
- Cinematography: Derek Scott
- Edited by: Joanna Terbush
- Music by: Allan Alper
- Production company: Saber Productions
- Distributed by: Bryanston Distributing Company
- Release date: March 1975
- Running time: 90 minutes
- Country: United States
- Language: English

The Black Gestapo is a 1975 American independent blaxploitation crime film about a vigilante named General Ahmed, who starts an inner-city "people's army" to protect the black citizens of Watts. When the army succeeds in chasing the mob out of town, Ahmed is replaced by his colleague Colonel Kojah, who reforms the movement into a Nazi criminal organization in order to have complete control over the town.

The film was written and directed by Lee Frost and stars Rod Perry, Charles P. Robinson, Phil Hoover, and Ed Cross, and features a cameo by Uschi Digard. It depicts African-American men dressed as Nazis and contains scenes of violence (including genital mutilation) and soft-core nudity.

== Cast ==
- Rod Perry as General Ahmed
- Charles P. Robinson as Colonel Kojah
- Phil Hoover as Vito
- Ed Cross as Delmay
- Angela Brent as Marsha
- Wes Bishop as Ernest
- Lee Frost as Vincent
- Dona Desmond as White whore
- Charles Howerton as Joe
- Rai Tasco as Dr. Lisk
- David Bryant as dope pusher
- J. Christopher Sullivan as TV owner
- Susan Randolph as Vincent's girl
- Colin Male as newscaster
- Gene Russell as gambler
- Uschi Digard as Kojah's girl
- Chuck Wells as trooper
- Bill Quinn as accountant
- Tim Wade as hood
- Roger Gentry as hood

== Critical reception ==
On AllMovie, critic Donald Guarisco wrote that the film "lives up [to] the offensive potential of its title by cramming every bit of nastiness it can muster into its short running time", and that although it "is socially irresponsible [...] At its best, it's even inspired in a very twisted sort of way". Critic Matthew Roe wrote in Under the Radar magazine that the "Nazi iconography in this film is as subtle as the apocolypse", that "everything about this film screams 70s action schlock", and although "there are scattershot moments of interesting introspection, the movie keeps the dial cranked up and keeps cheap thrills coming its entire runtime".

== See also ==
- List of American films of 1975
