= Pride (1998 film) =

- US DVD cover
- Directed by: Shunya Itō
- Written by: Hiroo Matsuda
- Starring: Masahiko Tsugawa; Ayumi Ishida; Scott Wilson; Ronny Cox
- Cinematography: Yudai Kato
- Edited by: Takeo Araki
- Music by: Michiru Ōshima
- Production companies: Toei Company; Tokyo Film Production Inc.
- Distributed by: Toei Company
- Release date: 23 May 1998 (Japan)
- Running time: 161 minutes
- Country: Japan
- Languages: Japanese; English

Pride (プライド 運命の瞬間;, Puraido: Unmei no Shunkan), also known as Pride: The Fateful Moment, is a 1998 Japanese historical drama directed by Shunya Itō. The film, based on the International Military Tribunal for the Far East of 1946–48, depicts Japanese prime minister Hideki Tojo (played by Masahiko Tsugawa) as a family man who fought to defend Japan and Asia from Western colonialism but was ultimately hanged by a vengeful United States. Shot at a cost of ¥1.5 billion, Pride was one of the highest-grossing Japanese films of 1998 and was nominated for two Japan Academy Prizes. Although the filmmakers intended the film to open dialogue on Japanese history, it was controversial in China, South Korea, and Japan owing to concerns of historical denialism.

== Plot ==
In 1941, prime minister of Japan Hideki Tojo orders an attack on the United States, drawing that country into World War II. Four years later, Japan surrenders, and a victorious United States and its allies begin to try Tojo and other members of the Japanese government for war crimes.

The International Military Tribunal for the Far East is convened in 1946 and charges 28 individuals with Class-A war crimes. They are to be prosecuted by Joseph B. Keenan and tried in front of an international group of judges, including Australian Justice Sir William Webb. All twenty-eight plead not guilty, and Tojo charges the Americans with hypocrisy for trying him despite acts such as the atomic bombings of Hiroshima and Nagasaki.

As the victors are the ones conducting the trials, Tojo and his co-defendants are unable to receive a fair trial, and some of the prosecutions' witnesses give false testimony. The verdict is ultimately delivered on 12 November 1948: Tojo, together with six of his co-defendants, is to be hanged for his role in the war. This sentence is carried out on 23 December 1948.

== Production ==
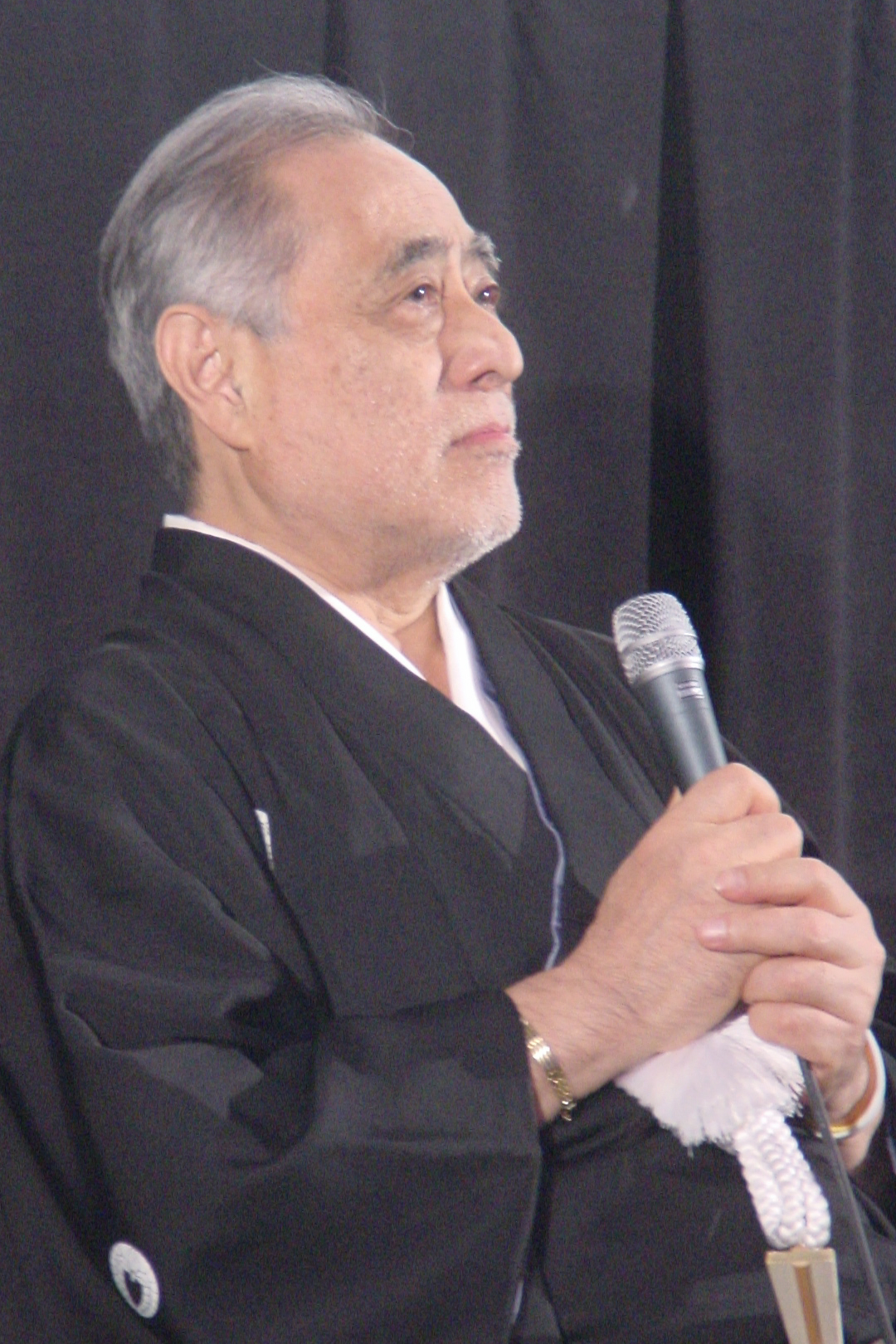
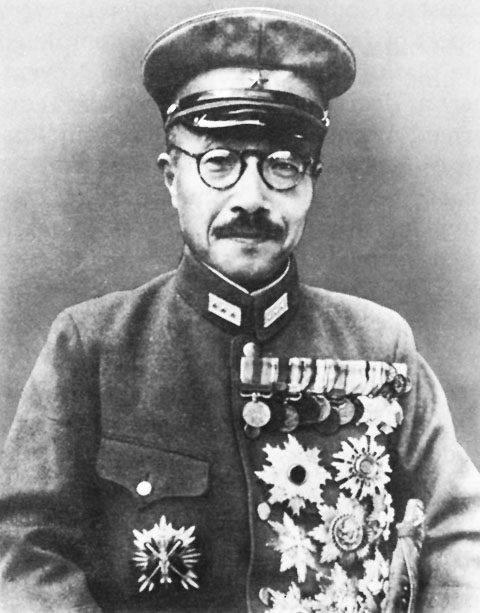
Masahiko Tsugawa (left) portrayed Japanese Prime Minister Hideki Tōjō.

Pride was directed by Shunya Itō and written by Hiroo Matsuda. This film was co-produced by Kanji Nakagawa and Masao Sato for Toei Company. Cinematography was handled by Yudai Kato, with editing by Takeo Araki. Music for the film was composed by Michiru Ōshima. The film cost ¥1.5 billion (USD 11 million) to produce, thrice as much as usually spent by the company; much of this money was provided by the president of a construction company who was known to be well connected to the right wing.

The film starred Masahiko Tsugawa as Hideki Tojo and Ayumi Ishida as his wife, Katsuko. American actors Scott Wilson and Ronny Cox appeared as Prosecutor Keenan and Justice Webb, respectively. Indian actor Suresh Oberoi played Radhabinod Pal, the lone dissenting judge – according to AllMovie's Jonathan Crow, the film's only non-Japanese hero. The film also featured Eiji Okuda, Naho Toda, Gitan Ōtsuru, and Anupam Kher.

Pride was not the first film to deal with the tribunal, also known as the "Tokyo Trial". A film by Masaki Kobayashi, titled Tokyo Trial, had been released in 1983. This film, based on US Department of Defense footage, had taken a similarly negative view of the trials and argued that the US had also committed war crimes during the 20th century.

== Themes ==
Pride's depiction of Tojo is highly positive. Rather than the "absolute monster" sometimes depicted in American films on him, he is depicted as a strong, highly nationalistic, leader who loves his family and wants only to rid Asia of colonial rule. By comparison, the prosecutor Keenan is portrayed as a noisy and ignorant, yet scheming man. This depiction is based on the argument that Japan's war-time actions were misunderstood, and that these actions were not intended as acts of aggression, but as acts of self-preservation.

The historian Peter High notes that Pride is one in a line of Japanese works from the late 1990s, including the films Tower of Lilies and Wings of God, in which the Japanese are portrayed as victims of American vindictiveness and viciousness. This trend, possibly influenced by the economic downturn then in progress, was backed heavily by older Japanese businessmen. By this time, the Tokyo Trial had come to be seen as the source of a loss of Japanese identity and tradition. The academic Keiichirō Kobori wrote a book in 1996 which proclaimed the trial to be "the starting point that ruined Japan" (日本をダメにした出発点), and the businessman Maeno Tōru blamed a "Tokyo Trial view of history" for the negative view of Japanese history and culture. Futamura quotes Itō as saying:

... the trial was a continuation of the war by the Allies, especially the United States, within the context of its post-war strategy. It was a trial to drag Japan into a subordinate relationship to the United States in order to stop it from again becoming a military threat. In addition to demilitarization, the trial stepped even into the Japanese mentality and labelled the war an inexcusable act of aggression.

— Shunya Itō, (Futamura 2008, p. 98)

== Release and reception ==
Pride premiered on 23 May 1998, in 140 theatres nationwide. It was a commercial success, selling the most tickets of any domestic production released in the first half of the year. Reviews of the film in Japan were generally positive, and included praise for the star's "feverish" acting (from the Asahi Shimbun) and the quality of the sets (from the Sankei Shimbun). Crow, however, gave the film two and a half stars out of five.

At the 22nd Japan Academy Prize ceremony held in March 1999, Pride received two nominations, for Outstanding Performance by an Actor in a Leading Role (Tsugawa) and Best Art Direction (Akira Naitō). It won neither, with Best Actor being taken by Akira Emoto for Dr. Akagi and Best Art Direction being won by Katsumi Nakazawa for his work in Begging for Love.

In Japan, Pride was given a home release in VHS in December 1998. A Region 2 DVD followed in May 2011. Liberty International Entertainment and Cargo Films released a DVD edition of the film in North America on 25 November 2003; this version included subtitles and a picture gallery.

== Controversy and legacy ==
International response to the film was highly critical owing to concerns of historical revisionism, and Crow suggests that China and Korea – both of which had suffered under Japanese rule during World War II – viewed the film as "deliberate provocation" in light of Japan's unwillingness to recognise its past human rights abuses. Complaints included that the film whitewashed Tojo's role in the war, or that it justified the actions taken by Japan. Response in Japan was more positive, with CBS News recording that "[b]esides one small campaign against the film by a labor union, there have been no protests," although similar concerns of denialism were echoed.

Sato, in an interview, stated that the film was meant to "kindle a more nuanced debate about Tojo" rather than the "black and white" depictions which were more common. Tojo's granddaughter, Yuko Iwanami, stated that the film "challenged the image of her grandfather as a villain" by presenting a truth which had been "erased" after the war. Itō, meanwhile, stated that he "wanted to show how Tojo fought with pride", standing and facing the tribunal on his own.

Itō would not direct another feature-length film until Lost Crime – Flash in 2010, a crime film which Mark Schilling of The Japan Times considered enough to release him from "director's jail" – "the limbo in which film directors find themselves after a flop or two."

In 2006, the Chinese director Gao Qunshu released another film regarding the Tribunal. Titled The Tokyo Trial, it focused on the Chinese judge Mei Ju-ao (played by Damian Lau) and portrayed Tojo (Akira Hoshino) as a gruff and unrepentant man.

== Works cited ==
- 第22回日本アカデミー賞優秀作品 [22nd Japan Academy Prize] (in Japanese). Nippon Academy-shō Association. Archived from the original on 14 July 2014.
- プライド 運命の瞬間 [Pride: Moment of Fate]. Kinema Junpo (in Japanese). Archived from the original on 24 May 2013.
- プライド 運命の瞬間 [Pride: Moment of Fate]. Tsutaya (in Japanese). Archived from the original on 28 June 2022.
- Crow, Jonathan. "Pride (1998)". AllMovie. Rovi. Archived from the original on 25 September 2019.
- Elley, Derek (26 July 2006). "Review: 'International Military Tribunal Far East'". Variety. Archived from the original on 4 March 2016.
- Fackler, Martin (7 April 1998). "Japanese Film Shows Tojo As Hero -- World War Ii Leader Acted In Self-Defense, Movie Studio Claims". The Seattle Times. Archived from the original on 3 March 2016.
- Futamura, Madoka (2008). War Crimes Tribunals and Transitional Justice: The Tokyo Trial and the Nuremberg Legacy. New York: Routledge. ISBN 978-0-415-42673-2.
- "New Movie Makes Tojo A Hero". CBS News. 15 May 1998. Archived from the original on 25 January 2015.
- High, Peter B. (2003). The Imperial Screen: Japanese Film Culture in the Fifteen Years' War, 1931-1945. Wisconsin Studies in Film. Madison: University of Wisconsin Press. ISBN 978-0-299-18130-7.
- "Pride: Cast and Crew". AllMovie. Rovi. Archived from the original on 13 June 2022.
- "Pride: Releases". AllMovie. Rovi. Archived from the original on 13 June 2022.
- Schilling, Mark (2 July 2010). "'Lost Crime Senko (Lost Crime — Flash)'". The Japan Times. Archived from the original on 11 March 2016.
- Thomas, Julia (2002). "Photography, National Identity, and the 'Cataract of Times': Wartime Images and the Case of Japan". In David E Lorey; William H Beezley (eds.). Genocide, Collective Violence, and Popular Memory: The Politics of Remembrance in the Twentieth Century. World Beat Series. Vol. 1. Wilmington, Del: SR Books. ISBN 978-0-415-42673-2.
