= Kayoko Shiraishi =

Japanese stage actress

- Born: December 9, 1941 (age 83); Minato, Tokyo, Japan
- Occupation: Stage actress

Kayoko Shiraishi (白石 加代子, Shiraishi Kayoko) is a Japanese stage actress. Shiraishi became involved in the Angura ("underground") theater movement in Japan in the early 1960s, as the star performer in a theater troupe called the Waseda Little Theatre, led by director Tadashi Suzuki. In Shiraishi, Suzuki found an actress whose physical talents could capture his theories about Japanese stage performance. Her first film role was as Oba in Female Convict Scorpion: Jailhouse 41 (1973). She is the narrator in the 1992 film of Stravinsky's opera-oratorio Oedipus Rex directed by Julie Taymor.

== Filmography ==
=== Films ===
Date	Title	Role	Notes	Ref.
1973	Female Convict Scorpion: Jailhouse 41	Oba		
1977	Akuma no Temariuta			
1983	The Makioka Sisters			
1992	Oedipus Rex	narrator		
2004	Umizaru			
2005	Yamato			
2008	Fine, Totally Fine			
2020	Labyrinth of Cinema			
2022	Thousand and One Nights			
2023	Kumo to Saru no Kazoku			
2023	Rohan at the Louvre			
2025	Scarlet	Old woman (voice)		
2025	A Sower of Seeds 5			

=== Television ===
Date	Title	Role	Notes	Ref.
2004	Dark Tales of Japan		TV movie	
2017	Hiyokko	Tomi Tachibana	Asadora	
2019	Idaten	Wakako Mishima	Taiga drama	
2023	The Makanai: Cooking for the Maiko House	Kiyo's grandmother		

== Honours ==
- Medal with Purple Ribbon (2005)
- Order of the Rising Sun, 4th Class, Gold Rays with Rosette (2012)
