= Female Convict Scorpion: Jailhouse 41 =

Female Prisoner Scorpion: Jailhouse 41
- Theatrical release poster
- Directed by: Shunya Itō
- Written by: Fumio Konami; Hiro Matsuda; Shunya Itō
- Based on: Scorpion by Tōru Shinohara
- Produced by: Kineo Yoshimine
- Starring: Meiko Kaji; Fumio Watanabe
- Cinematography: Masao Shimizu
- Edited by: Osamu Tanaka
- Music by: Shunsuke Kikuchi
- Production company: Toei Company
- Release date: December 30, 1972 (Japan)
- Running time: 94 minutes
- Country: Japan
- Language: Japanese

Female Prisoner Scorpion: Jailhouse 41 (Japanese: 女囚さそり 第41雑居房, Hepburn: Joshū Sasori Dai 41 Zakkyobō) is a Japanese film released in 1972 by Toei Company. It is the second in the Female Prisoner Scorpion series. It stars Meiko Kaji and is directed by Shunya Itō, who also directed the first film in the series, Female Prisoner #701: Scorpion.

== Plot ==
Nami Matsushima (Meiko Kaji) is being kept bound in an underground solitary confinement cell, where she fashions a shiv out of a spoon by holding it in her mouth and grinding it against the concrete floor. The prison's chief warden, Goda, is to be promoted to a higher post shortly. When an inspector visits the prison, Matsushima is brought out of confinement for one day. During the inspection, Matsushima attacks Goda and slices his face. The other prisoners start to riot, but it is quelled by the guards.

The prisoners are punished by being sent to an intensive labour camp. Believing that Matsushima may inspire the other prisoners to revolt, Goda assigns four guards to publicly rape her. On the way back from the labour camp, Matsushima is in a van with six other prisoners, Azama (Eiko Yanami), Miyako, nicknamed "Chibi" (Kuniko Ishii), Noda (Hiroko Isayama), Oba (Kayoko Shiraishi), Oikawa (Yuki Aresa), and Yasugi (Yukie Kagawa). The other prisoners beat Matsushima bloody, knocking her unconscious. The guards are alerted that Matsushima is feared dead. When they stop the van to inspect, Matsushima strangles and kills one guard, and Oba and the other prisoners capture the other guard and blow up the van. When Goda sees the wreckage, he sends search parties after Matsushima.

The prisoners escape to an abandoned hut near a village, where they decide to wait for nightfall and steal new clothes to escape in. Oba reveals her crime: when she found her husband cheating on her, she drowned her two-year-old son and killed her unborn baby by stabbing herself in the stomach. In the village, the prisoners find a mysterious old woman wielding a dagger. A surreal sequence follows in which a narrator reveals the crimes for which each prisoner was jailed - Oikawa for strangling her lover who was abusing her son, Azama for poisoning her married lover's wife, Yasugi, a prostitute, as an accessory when violence broke out amongst her jealous johns, Noda for committing arson against people she envied, and Chibi for killing her father in self-defense as he tried to rape her. The old woman gives Matsushima her knife before she dies; her body then turns into leaves and is blown away by the wind.

Oikawa sneaks out of the hut and into her nearby family home, where she is reunited with her son, but finds two prison guards waiting for her. They offer to free her if she reveals the others' locations. Distraught, Oikawa leaves. One guard follows her while the other returns to Goda. Matsushima kills the guard following Oikawa. During the scuffle, Azama is shot in the stomach accidentally and dies shortly afterward.

A tour bus passing through the region is warned by prison guards to look out for the escaped prisoners. Three sexually aggressive men from the tourist group find Chibi returning from the river, gang-rape her repeatedly, and then throw her off a cliff. The other prisoners find her body and chase the men back to the tour bus, which they hijack. Oba and the other prisoners torture, strip and bind the three men and menace the other passengers.

Another surreal sequence shows the prisoners being ostracized by society, for which they are now taking revenge. As the bus approaches a checkpoint, Oba throws Matsushima out of the bus to serve as a decoy. Matsushima is captured, but Goda's men arrange a roadblock in front of the bus, including a flatbed truck with Oikawa's son and elderly parents on it. The bus is stopped and Oikawa rushes out to meet her son. As the guards try to catch her, she is shot by snipers. Oba orders the prisoners to kill the hostages. She kills the bus driver and commandeers the bus, scattering the guards and escaping the roadblock.

By nightfall, the bus is surrounded by the police. Goda sends Matsushima to the prisoners to learn the hostages' status. Matsushima lies and says the hostages have been killed, and the police lead a charge on the bus. The prisoners push the three rapists off the bus, where they are killed in a hail of police bullets. In the ensuing fight, all the prisoners except Oba die. Oba is injured and set to return to prison in the same vehicle as Matsushima. Goda orders the guards to stage an escape attempt by Matsushima in order to kill her. The guards stop at a junkyard and are about to shoot her when Oba saves her by biting the guard on the neck. Matsushima kills the guards. The next morning, as they flee through a junkyard, Oba succumbs to her wounds and dies.

Goda is promoted to a higher position in Tokyo, where Matsushima tracks him down and stabs him to death. The film ends with a fantasy sequence in which all the female prisoners of the jailhouse, wearing their striped prison dresses, run free through the city, passing Matsushima's knife from woman to woman.

== Cast ==
- Meiko Kaji as Nami Matsushima, Prisoner #701, a.k.a. Scorpion
- Kayoko Shiraishi as Hide Oba, a jaded and ambitious prisoner who has an antagonistic relationship with Matsushima.
- Yuki Aresa as Haruyo Oikawa, a.k.a. Oharu, a mother who killed her abusive lover and desperately tries to make it home to her son.
- Yukie Kagawa as Tomiko Yasugi, a prostitute with a forceful and violent personality.
- Eiko Yanami as Harue Azama, the poisoner who yearns to be reunited with her lover after she escapes. While imprisoned, she and Asako were lovers.
- Hiroko Isayama as Asako Noda, the arsonist. A lesbian, she and Azama were lovers.
- Kuniko Ishii as Rose Miyako, a.k.a. Chibi, the youngest prisoner who is still sweet-natured.
- Shinzō Hotta as Furuya
- Hōsei komatsu as Tsuji
- Kai Atō as Ogata
- Fumio Watanabe as Inspector Goda
- Nenji Kobayashi as the young man
- Hideo Murota as Okisaki
- Rokko Toura as the Ministry of Justice official

== Release ==
Female Prisoner Scorpion: Jailhouse 41 was released in Japan on December 30, 1972.

== Reception ==
In a retrospective review, AllMovie described the film as "an outrageously stylish and imaginative women-in-prison film." and that the film "bombards the viewer with outrageously brutal images, including the aftermath of a rather creative castration; lyrical images such as leaves turning from brown-orange to gray for one death scene and a waterfall turning red for another; and Kabuki-like fantasy sequences that are interspersed between the action." The review noted that the story line "could be enjoyed as camp or even praised as a critique of society's mistreatment of women, although the unpleasant scenes of rape and torture of women may ruin some people's enjoyment of the film." Sight & Sound described the film as "artful exploitation", noting that "All the male-female relationships are portrayed as antagonistic and abusive, and there is little empathy among the women themselves" as well as that "Although there are scenes of rape, torture and molestation, the tough content is offset by the film's formal beauty -- it's a rare scene that passes without some kind of visual or aural flourish."

Video Watchdog described the film as "the breakout rediscovery of the new millennium."
