= Tōru Shinohara =

Japanese manga artist

Tōru Shinohara (篠原とおる, Shinohara Tōru; born April 28, 1936) is a Japanese manga artist.

He was born in Niihama, Ehime. After graduating from high school in 1955, he started working at a factory in Osaka making car parts but quit after only ten months. He studied manga via a mail-offered course and wrote to various manga magazines. In 1958, came his first commercially printed work Fukumenhakushi (覆面博士) and he began his career as a manga artist.

He is best known for Nippon Keibaden that detailed the history of Japan's horse racing industry and its horses. He is also known for beautiful amazon-like heroines who are never daunted by the hardship they endure. Since 1970, he has written a series of works titled Sasori, lit. scorpion, which is the name for a female inmate and heroine seeking escape and revenge upon those who wronged her. Director Shunya Ito started a series of ten films starring Meiko Kaji based on the manga, the most famous one being the initial film, Female Prisoner 701: Scorpion. However, Ito withdrew from the project after three, and Kaji four films. Many of his works have been turned into movies since 1972.

== List of works ==
- Fukumen Hakushi (覆面博士)
- Mehyo Mako (女豹マコ)
- Zubeko Tantei Ran (ズベ公探偵ラン)
- Nippon Keibaden (にっぽん競馬伝)
- Teinen Shokun (定年諸君)
- Toko (陶子)
- Kariudobachi (狩人蜂)
- Sasori (さそり)
- Kauchi Zankyoden Shamo (河内残侠伝軍鶏)
- Yadokari (やどかり)
- Onna Toji Sayaka (女刀師サヤカ)
- Garando (がらんどう)
- Zero-ka no Onna (O課の女)
- Yakochu (夜光虫)
- Wanibunsho / 82-bunsho (ワニ分署 / 82分署)
- Keiji Anko (刑事あんこう)
- Shokuchuka (食虫花)
- Hikuidori (火喰鳥)
- Ginsasa (銀笹)
- Suna (砂)
- Onna Shiokinin ZEBRA (女仕置き人ZEBRA)
