= Rod Perry (actor) =

American actor (1934–2020)

- Born: Roderick Maurice Perry; July 30, 1934
- Died: December 17, 2020 (aged 86)
- Occupation: Actor
- Years active: 1964–2005

Roderick Maurice Perry (July 30, 1934 – December 17, 2020) was an American actor best known for his role as Sgt. David "Deacon" Kay in the 1970s TV series S.W.A.T. Perry also played leading roles in two blaxploitation movies in the mid-1970s: The Black Godfather (1974) and The Black Gestapo (1975). Other TV appearances include Barney Miller, Good Times, Babylon 5, and the 1974 TV movies The Autobiography of Miss Jane Pittman and Trapped Beneath the Sea. In the 2000s, Perry had a cameo role in the 2003 film version of S.W.A.T., playing the father of the character he portrayed three decades earlier in the TV series, played on this occasion by LL Cool J.

== Background ==
He is the father of singer DeQn Sue who released her Zeitgeist album in 2014.

== Career ==
Perry's earliest film work was in the Lamberto V. Avellana directed Indian / Philippine film, The Evil Within, released in 1970. He played the part of Rod Stevens who teamed up with special agent Dev Varma (played by Dev Anand) to bust up an opium syndicate. Following that he played the part of cowboy Joe Pittman in the made for television film, The Autobiography of Miss Jane Pittman. His character Joe Pittman marries Miss Jane Pittman (Played by Cicely Tyson). After he is killed from being dragged by a horse. After that he had the lead role in Street Wars aka The Black Godfather, which also starred Don Chastain and Jimmy Witherspoon.

Perry was cast as Sgt. David "Deacon" Kay in the TV series S.W.A.T which came out in 1975, and ran until 1976. The role of "Deacon" was to take care of the field communication. Perry played the lead role of Gen. Ahmed in the 1975 exploitation flick, The Black Gestapo.

In 2005, he appeared in Halloween House Party which also starred Joe Torry, Rachel Owens and Buddy Lewis.

== Filmography ==
Film
Title	Role	Director	Year	Notes #
The Evil Within	Rod Stevens	Lamberto V. Avellana	1970	
The Autobiography of Miss Jane Pittman	Joe Pittman	John Korty	1974	Made for television
The Black Godfather aka Street Wars	J.J.	John Evans	1974	
Trapped Beneath the Sea	Jimmy	William Graham	1974	Made for television
The Black Gestapo	General Ahmed	Lee Frost	1975	
S.W.A.T.	Deke's Dad	Clark Johnson	2003	
Halloween House Party	Old Man	Leo Lawrence	2005	

Television shows
Title	Episode #	Role	Director	Year	Notes #
On Broadway Tonight		Himself		1964	aired 9 September 1964
The Merv Griffin Show	Episode #2.55	Himself		1965	aired 23 July 1965
The Merv Griffin Show	Episode #3.54	Himself		1965	aired 18 November 1965
The Merv Griffin Show	Episode #3.61	Himself		1965	aired 29 November 1965
Barney Miller	The Life and Times of Barney Miller	Sgt. Wilson	Theodore J. Flicker	1974	aired 22 August 1974
Barney Miller	Experience	Sgt. Wilson	Danny Arnold	1975	aired 30 January 1975
S.W.A.T.	37 episodes from 1975-1976	Sergeant David 'Deacon' Kay	various	1975 - 1976	aired 24 February 1975 to 3 April 1976
Project U.F.O.	Sighting 4003: The Fremont Incident	Robert Lee Armstrong	Sigmund Neufeld	1978	aired 12 March 1978
Good Times	A Matter of Mothers	Jeffrey	Gerren Keith	1979	aired 18 July 1979
Babylon 5	Survivors	General Netter	Jim Johnston	1994	aired 4 May 1994
