= The Black Godfather =

1974 American blaxploitation film

- Original theatrical release poster
- Directed by: John Evans
- Written by: John Evans
- Produced by: John Evans; Uncredited: Jerry Gross
- Starring: Rod Perry; Damu King; Don Chastain; Diane Sommerfield; Jimmy Witherspoon
- Cinematography: Jack Steely
- Edited by: James Christopher
- Music by: Phil Moore; Martin Yarbrough
- Production company: Cougnar Productions
- Distributed by: Cinemation Industries
- Release date: September 3, 1974
- Running time: 90 min.
- Country: United States
- Language: English
- Box office: $1.3 million

The Black Godfather is a 1974 American blaxploitation film written and directed by John Evans and starring Rod Perry, Damu King, Don Chastain, Diane Sommerfield and Jimmy Witherspoon. The plot is about J.J. (Rod Perry), a rising star in the black crime scene, who is in the process of consolidating his power over the neighborhood. One of the only remaining obstacles is the white heroin cartel that is reluctant to abandon such a lucrative market. Tensions rise, and an explosive confrontation is the result.

== Plot ==
J.J. and a friend plan to rob the house of Tommy, a well-known gangster. Tommy opens the door and attempts to shoot them, before he himself is killed by another person inside the house. J.J.'s friend is also killed by the assailant. Tommy dies in J.J.'s arms in an alley. Street boss Nate Williams takes J.J. to safety and tends to his wounds. Williams is impressed by J.J.'s courage in breaking into Tommy's house. He offers J.J. some advice in surviving on the streets and gives him some money.

In time, J.J. grows in power and position in the street, longing for more as he sells drugs and tries to gain better status. He wants to get rid of another drug dealer named Tony Burton, a white gangster trafficking heroin into a predominantly black community. J.J. talks to a man called Diablo about taking care of securing the neighborhood from Tony's men and other drug dealers. Lieutenant Joe, a crooked cop, meets with J.J., who explains to him that he is willing to go to war with Tony and any other drug dealer that exploits the black community. He tells Joe to relay the information back to Tony, knowing that Joe takes bribes from any and all drug dealers so long as he gains money. Lieutenant Joe notifies Tony of J.J.'s plans, but Tony refuses to back down.

Williams brings his daughter Yvonne to his next meeting with J.J. Williams warns J.J. about trying to push Tony out of the territory, and orders J.J. not to take action. However, J.J. refuses to change his mind. The next morning, Tony visits Williams and tells him that J.J. should stop harassing his people, threatening bloodshed. Williams is not intimidated and tells Tony to be careful, otherwise the bloodshed will spill over to his side. J.J. and Yvonne fall in love and sleep together. The next morning, J.J. tells Yvonne that he loves her, but cannot commit to a relationship for the time being.

J.J. and his men continue to wage war on other gangsters invading their territory. They interrogate a white gangster who tells them about a planned drug shipment. Later, J.J.'s men break into another gangster's home and kill him, without taking any of the drugs. Lieutenant Joe tells Tony that J.J. has been doing work on another drug dealer. A member of the community goes to J.J.'s club and tells him that when she was at Tony's place, she heard about a drug shipment coming in worth three and a half million dollars.

Diablo's men are set up and are caught at a home by police. Tony talks on the phone with one of his men who confirm that the drug shipment will be heading to New Orleans. J.J. and his men wait at the airport with artillery and start a gunfight with members of Tony's gang. J.J. steals the shipment and calls Tony to taunt him. Tony immediately responds by going to Williams' house to question him about the whereabouts of J.J. and the drug shipment. Lieutenant Joe tries to stop Tony from assaulting Williams, but gets shot. After beating Williams to death, Tony kidnaps Yvonne as a bargaining chip to get the shipment back.

Diablo and J.J. begin arguing about what to do and nearly end up fighting each other physically back at their headquarters. J.J. cools down and tells Diablo that the problem is "out there" against Tony and not within themselves and the community. Tony calls J.J. and the two work out a deal for the package. Tony says he'll give $350,000 and Yvonne back in exchange for the drugs, while J.J. tells him to bring only one man. J.J.'s men listen to a recording of the conversation, where one of them determines Tony is near a church. One of J.J.'s men later discovers that Yvonne has been taken to the hospital.

J.J. and his men go to the hospital and confront Tony and his men. A violent shootout occurs as J.J. and Diablo run into the hospital's kitchen. Tony hides behind a trashcan with Yvonne, who stabs him to death with a butcher knife.

== Cast ==
- Rod Perry as J.J., a young African American male who becomes a street boss after being taken in by the "Black Godfather". J.J. is exposed to violence when his good friend gets shot and killed after the two try to steal from a drug dealer. Luckily surviving, J.J. becomes dedicated to keeping the black community free from drugs even if it means killing. Rod Perry is also a former NFL player. This is his first film playing the main role.
- Damu King as "Diablo"; second to J.J. in power, does most of the dirty work in carrying out violence against whoever is in the way. Diablo is trusted by J.J. and is relied upon to be the muscle of their operations.
- Don Chastain as Tony Burton, rival mafia boss who is in charge of all the drug trafficking happening in J.J.'s community. Burton is the main antagonist. He is very influential, powerful and dangerous, and has no problem with violence.
- Diane Sommerfield as Yvonne Williams, daughter of Nate Williams. Yvonne is the love interest of J.J. She is known to be important to J.J. and a target of kidnapping for Tony Burton.
- Jimmy Witherspoon as Nate Williams, "the Black Godfather". Nate Williams takes in J.J. and helps him survive after being shot. He gives J.J. the money to start up and take care of himself. Williams is the older generation of street boss who oversees everything.
- Duncan McLeod as Joe Sterling, a crooked police lieutenant who cuts deals with drug dealers on the side. Sterling overlooks much of the drug trafficking made by the gang members but still leaves room for morality when it comes to taking a human life.
- Tony Burton as Sonny Spyder Brown, a buddy of J.J. and Nate Williams, who tries to confront and convinced J.J. of Money and convicting him over something that has got to do with drugs, he is also a boxer.

== Themes ==
The Black Godfather was released in 1974, shortly after titles such as Shaft and Sweet Sweetback's Baadasssss Song. Almost unknown, The Black Godfather follows the same formula and aspects of many blaxploitation films. There is a strong, African American, male protagonist (J.J.); a negatively portrayed white antagonist (Tony); a corrupt white policeman (Joe); and a beautiful, young African American female love interest (Yvonne). The setting is also placed in an urban area where the characters deal or are involved with drugs, violence and gangs. This sort of film appealed to an audience that was not used to seeing African Americans at the center of a role.

== See also ==
- List of American films of 1974
