= Shunya Itō =

Japanese film director (born 1937)

- Born: February 17, 1937 (age 89)
- Occupation: Film director

Shunya Itō (伊藤 俊也, Itō Shun'ya; born February 17, 1937) is a Japanese film director known for starting the Sasori / Female Prisoner Scorpion series of 1970s exploitation films starring Meiko Kaji. Itō worked for Toei Company for most of his career. In 1972, he won a Directors Guild of Japan New Directors Citation for his first film, Female Prisoner #701: Scorpion.

He won Picture of the Year at the Japanese Academy Awards in 1985 with his film Gray Sunset, a story of a man suffering from Alzheimer's disease. This thus became Japan's entry for the Academy Award for Best Foreign Language Film instead of Akira Kurosawa's Ran, which caused a slight uproar in Western media as many critics thought Ran had a real chance of winning, whereas Gray Sunset was not even shortlisted.

In 1995, he directed Lupin III: Farewell to Nostradamus. In 1998, he directed the World War II drama Pride: The Fateful Moment, presenting a sympathetic view of Hideki Tōjō on trial at the International Military Tribunal for the Far East, attracting accusations of revisionism.

== Filmography ==
- Female Prisoner #701: Scorpion (1972)
- Female Prisoner Scorpion: Jailhouse 41 (1972)
- Female Prisoner Scorpion: Beast Stable (1973)
- Inugami no tatari, aka Curse of the Dog God (犬神の悪霊, 1977)
- To Trap a Kidnapper (1982)
- Hakujasho (1983)
- Gray Sunset (1985)
- Labyrinth Romanesque, aka Labyrinth of Flower Garden (花園の迷宮, 1988)
- Misty Kid of Wind: The Glass Cape (風の又三郎 ガラスのマント, 1989)
- Lupin III: Farewell to Nostradamus (1995)
- Onimaro zanshinken, aka Demon Slayer Sword (1995, TV movie)
- Pride: The Fateful Moment (1998)
- What's a Director?, aka Eiga kantoku tte nanda! (映画監督って何だ！, 2006 documentary)
- 300 Million, aka Lost Crime, aka Rosuto kuraimu: Senkô (ロストクライム -閃光-, 2010)
- Hajimari mo owari mo nai, aka No Beginning, No End (始まりも終わりもない, 2013)
- Independence of Japan (日本独立, 2020)
