= John Evans (director) =

American film director

- Born: United States
- Occupations: Film director, screenwriter, documentary filmmaker
- Years active: 1968 - 1978

John Evans is an American film director and screenwriter and documentary filmmaker known for such films as Speeding Up Time. The Black Godfather, and Blackjack
