= Female Prisoner 701: Scorpion =

Female Prisoner #701: Scorpion
- Theatrical release poster
- Directed by: Shunya Itō
- Written by: Fumio Konami; Hiro Matsuda
- Based on: Scorpion by Tōru Shinohara
- Produced by: Kineo Yoshimine
- Starring: Meiko Kaji; Isao Natsuyagi; Fumio Watanabe; Hiroko Ogi
- Cinematography: Hanjiro Nakazawa
- Edited by: Osamu Tanaka
- Music by: Shunsuke Kikuchi
- Production company: Toei Company
- Release date: 25 August 1972 (Japan)
- Running time: 87 minutes
- Country: Japan
- Language: Japanese

Female Prisoner #701: Scorpion (女囚701号/さそり, Joshū Nana-maru-ichi Gō / Sasori) (Note: Also known as Female Convict 701: Scorpion) is a 1972 Japanese women in prison film produced by Toei Company and directed by Shunya Itō in his directorial debut. Based on a manga by Tōru Shinohara, the film stars Meiko Kaji as Nami Matsushima, a woman who is sent to prison after being betrayed by her detective lover, against whom she seeks revenge.

The film was followed by several sequels: Female Prisoner Scorpion: Jailhouse 41 (also released in 1972), Female Prisoner Scorpion: Beast Stable, and Female Prisoner Scorpion: 701's Grudge Song (both 1973).

== Plot ==
Nami Matsushima is used as a spy by her first real boyfriend, police detective Sugimi, to investigate a drug smuggling ring. However, her identity is discovered and she is raped by several drug dealers. It emerges that Sugimi was using Matsushima all along as a pretext to obtain a bribe from the yakuza. Seeking revenge, Matsushima makes a failed attempt to stab Sugimi on the steps of the Tokyo Metropolitan Police headquarters. She is sentenced to do hard time in a women's prison, where her prisoner number is 701.

The prison is run by sadistic and lecherous male guards. Prisoners are forced to walk up and down metal scaffolding naked while the guards watch from below. While incarcerated, Matsushima meets inmates like Yuki Kida, who was convicted for fraud and theft; Otsuka, jailed for burglary and extortion; and Katagiri, who was imprisoned for arson and illegally disposing of a body. Outside the prison, Sugimi and the yakuza orchestrate a plan in which Matsushima will succumb to an "accidental" death in prison.

The conspirators enlist the help of Katagiri and quickly set their plan in motion. Matsushima is attacked in the shower, but defends herself, wounding the attacker. She is punished by being held bound by ropes in solitary confinement. A talkative female prisoner tries to get information from her, but Matsushima remains silent. When the woman advances on her, Matsushima seduces her into a sexual encounter. The prisoner is revealed to be a rookie policewoman sent by warden Goda as a spy, but her passion for Matsushima turns her against the prison staff, and the angered Goda becomes determined to break Matsushima.

Katagiri and some other trustees torture Matsushima; one pours hot soup on her. Matsushima is able to trip the trustee and make her spill the vat of soup over herself, causing horrible burns. Matsushima is forced to dig holes for two consecutive days and nights. She kills a woman who attempts to attack her as she digs by tripping her and breaking her neck. As punishment, Matsushima is bound hung from the ceiling while being beaten by her fellow prisoners.

After a prison riot, Matsushima escapes and kills Sugimi and all of the yakuza with a dagger. As the film ends, Matsushima strides alone down the prison corridor.

== Cast ==
- Meiko Kaji as Nami Matsushima / Matsu The Scorpion
- Rie Yokoyama as Katagiri
- Yayoi Watanabe as Yukiko Kida
- Yōko Mihara as Masaki
- Akemi Negishi as Otsuka
- Keiko Kuni as Nemoto
- Saburo Date as Kaizu
- Shinzō Hotta as Furuya
- Hideo Murota as Okizaki
- Yoichi Numata as Soga
- Yumiko Katayama as Kito
- Emi Jo as Morikawa
- Isao Natsuyagi as Tsugio Sugimi
- Fumio Watanabe as Warden Goda

== Release ==
Female Prisoner #701: Scorpion was released in Japan on 25 August 1972.

=== Home media ===
Female Prisoner #701 was first released on DVD for Region 1 by Tokyo Shock on April 27, 2004. UK home video company Arrow Films released the film on Blu-ray on July 26, 2016, within a box-set containing the four films of the Female Prisoner Scorpion series.

== Reception ==
From retrospective reviews, Sight & Sound described the film as "pure exploitation" and that "there are a fair number of arty flourishes: expressionistic lighting and make up effects, theatrically stylised sets and gymnastic camerawork." The magazine commented on any feminist reading of the film, noting that any suggestion of a "feminist critique of patriarchal society" is "hard to reconcile with the sustained, glib emphasis on female torment." Video Watchdog described Female Convict #701 Scorpion as "inferior to its follow-up Female Convict Scorpion-Jailhouse 41", noting that it is "largely set-bound and lacking grandeur and poetry of its sequel".

== See also ==
- List of Japanese films of 1972
