= List of Guggenheim Fellowships awarded in 2010 =

The List of Guggenheim Fellowships awarded in 2010: Guggenheim Fellowships have been awarded annually since 1925, by the John Simon Guggenheim Memorial Foundation, to those "who have demonstrated exceptional capacity for productive scholarship or exceptional creative ability in the arts."

== Fellows ==
Fellow	Category	Field of Study
Kimberlee Acquaro	Creative Arts	Film
Lorraine Adams	Creative Arts	Fiction
Shelby Lee Adams	Creative Arts	Photography
Oscar E. Aguilera F.	Humanities	Linguistics
Ricardo Ainslie	Creative Arts	General Nonfiction
Ana Amado	Humanities	Literary Studies
Christy Anderson	Humanities	Architecture, Planning, & Design
Robert Antoni	Creative Arts	Fiction
Andrew Apter	Humanities	African Studies
Liliana Arrachea	Natural Sciences	Physical Sciences
Gauvin Alexander Bailey	Creative Arts	Fine Arts Research
Adam Begley	Creative Arts	Biography
John Ayotunde Bewaji	Social Sciences	Philosophy
Tom Bissell	Creative Arts	General Nonfiction
Ed Bowes	Creative Arts	Video & Audio
Francisco Bozinovic	Natural Sciences	Organismic Biology & Ecology
Patricia T. Bozza	Natural Sciences	Molecular & Cellular Biology
Troy Brauntuch	Creative Arts	Fine Arts
Joel Brouwer	Creative Arts	Poetry
Joshua Brown	Humanities	U.S. History
Markus Brunnermeier	Social Sciences	Economics
Antoinette Burton	Humanities	British History
Harmen Bussemaker	Natural Sciences	Molecular & Cellular Biology
Luca Buvoli	Creative Arts	Fine Arts
William Caferro	Humanities	Renaissance History
Rebecca Cammisa	Creative Arts	Film
Ethan Canin	Creative Arts	Fiction
Leonor Caraballo-Farman	Creative Arts	Film and Video
David Caron	Humanities	Intellectual & Cultural History
Arachu Castro	Natural Sciences	Medicine & Health
Rossina Cazali	Humanities	Fine Arts Research
Catherine Chalmers	Creative Arts	Video & Audio
Enrico Chapela	Creative Arts	Music Composition
Abraham C.-L. Chian	Natural Sciences	Earth Science
Anne Chu	Creative Arts	Fine Arts
Leon Chua	Natural Sciences	Engineering
John Collins	Creative Arts	Drama & Performance Art
Jane Comfort	Creative Arts	Choreography
Peter Constantine	Humanities	Translation
Ingrid Daubechies	Natural Sciences	Mathematics
Carlos de la Torre	Social Sciences	Sociology
Lav Diaz	Creative Arts	Film
Hasia R. Diner	Humanities	Intellectual & Cultural History
Edgardo Dobry	Creative Arts	Poetry
Anthony Doerr	Creative Arts	Fiction
C. Josh Donlan	Natural Sciences	Organismic Biology & Ecology
Jill Downen	Creative Arts	Fine Arts
Carolyn Drake	Creative Arts	Photography
Judith S. Eisen	Natural Sciences	Neuroscience
Caroline Elkins	Humanities	British History
Norman Ellstrand	Natural Sciences	Plant Sciences
Betsy Erkkila	Humanities	American Literature
Eduardo Espina	Creative Arts	Poetry
Angie Estes	Humanities	Poetry
Rita Felski	Humanities	Literary Criticism
Gary Fine	Social Sciences	Sociology
James H. Fowler	Social Sciences	Sociology
Dale Frail	Natural Sciences	Astronomy—Astrophysics
Amy Franceschini	Creative Arts	Fine Arts
Katherine Freeman	Natural Sciences	Earth Science
Nell Freudenberger	Creative Arts	Fiction
Alberto Fuguet	Creative Arts	Fiction
Matthew Gabel	Social Sciences	Political Science
Mario D. Galigniana	Natural Sciences	Molecular & Cellular Biology
Ted Genoways	Humanities	American Literature
Sharon Gerstel	Humanities	Medieval History
Peter Godwin	Creative Arts	General Nonfiction
Pinelopi Koujianou Goldberg	Social Sciences	Economics
Sander Goldberg	Humanities	Classics
Enrique Gonzalez Gonzalez	Humanities	History
Gaston Gordillo	Humanities	Iberian & Latin American History
Philip Gourevitch	Creative Arts	General Nonfiction
Alan Govenar	Humanities	Folklore & Popular Culture
Terence Gower	Creative Arts	Fine Arts
Paul Graham	Creative Arts	Photography
Vincent Grenier	Creative Arts	Video & Audio
Marlon Griffith	Creative Arts	Fine Arts
Jorge Villavicencio Grossmann	Creative Arts	Music Composition
Miguel Gutierrez	Creative Arts	Choreography
Kimiko Hahn	Creative Arts	Poetry
Monica Haller	Creative Arts	Photography
Barbara Hamby	Creative Arts	Poetry
Paul Harding	Creative Arts	Fiction
Jonathan Harr	Creative Arts	General Nonfiction
Lorenzo Harris	Creative Arts	Choreography
Joel Harrison	Creative Arts	Music Composition
Molly Haskell	Creative Arts	General Nonfiction
Bernard Haykel	Humanities	Near Eastern Studies
Bernard Herman	Humanities	Folklore & Popular Culture
Juan Felipe Herrera	Creative Arts	Poetry
Linda Hess	Humanities	South Asian Studies
Daniel Heyman	Creative Arts	Fine Arts
Kathryn High	Creative Arts	Fine Arts
Cynthia Hopkins	Creative Arts	Drama & Performance Art
Holly Hughes	Creative Arts	Drama & Performance Art
Pablo Irarrazava	Natural Sciences	Applied Mathematics
Petr Janata	Natural Sciences	Neuroscience
Sheila Jasanoff	Natural Sciences	Geography & Environmental Studies
Myriam Jimeno	Social Sciences	Anthropology
Walter Johnson	Humanities	U.S. History
Rosemary Joyce	Humanities	Anthropology & Cultural Studies
Pieter Judson	Humanities	German & East European History
Joshua Katz	Humanities	Classics
Mark Kilstofte	Creative Arts	Music Composition
Jin Hi Kim	Creative Arts	Music Composition
Junhyong Kim	Natural Sciences	Molecular & Cellular Biology
Mari Kimura	Creative Arts	Music Composition
Jeffrey Kinkley	Humanities	Literary Criticism
Shinobu Kitayama	Humanities	Psychology
Igor Klebanov	Natural Sciences	Physics
Herbert Kohl	Social Sciences	Education
Elizabeth Kolbert	Natural Sciences	Science Writing
Tamara Kostianovsky	Creative Arts	Fine Arts
Ladislav Kubik	Creative Arts	Music Composition
Thomas Kuehne	Humanities	Intellectual & Cultural History
Gerald Kutcher	Humanities	History of Science & Technology
Franziska Lamprecht	Creative Arts	Fine Arts
Jorge Lanzaro	Social Sciences	Political Science
Victor LaValle	Creative Arts	Fiction
Gregory Levine	Humanities	Fine Arts Research
Charles Lindsay	Creative Arts	Photography
Laurent Loinard	Natural Sciences	Physical Science
Hugo Daniel Lujan	Social Sciences	Medicine & Health
Mary Lum	Creative Arts	Fine Arts
Jim Lutes	Creative Arts	Fine Arts
Patrick Lynett	Natural Sciences	Geography & Environmental Studies
Nathaniel Mackey	Creative Arts	Poetry
Silvia Malagrino	Creative Arts	Film
Cameron Martin	Creative Arts	Fine Arts
Adeline Masquelier	Humanities	African Studies
Tomoko Masuzawa	Humanities	Religion
Richard Maxwell	Creative Arts	Drama & Performance Art
Colum McCann	Creative Arts	Fiction
Van McElwee	Creative Arts	Video & Audio
Lawrence McFarland	Creative Arts	Photography
Michael Jones McKean	Creative Arts	Fine Arts
Louise McReynolds	Humanities	Russian History
Anne Mendelson	Creative Arts	General Nonfiction
Zoila S. Mendoza	Humanities	Music Research - Ethnomusicology
Michael Meyer	Humanities	General Nonfiction
Philipp Meyer	Creative Arts	Fiction
Paula Michaels	Humanities	History of Science & Technology
Margaret M. Mitchell	Humanities	Translation
Hajoe Moderegger	Creative Arts	Fine Arts
Tomasz Mrowka	Natural Sciences	Mathematics
Maggie Nelson	Creative Arts	General Nonfiction
Nic Nicosia	Creative Arts	Photography
Mark Nowak	Creative Arts	Poetry
Helen O'Leary	Creative Arts	Fine Arts
Joseph O'Neil	Creative Arts	Fiction
João Ricardo Mendes de Oliveira	Natural Sciences	Neuroscience
Seung-Ah Oh	Creative Arts	Music Composition
Carmen Oquendo-Villar	Creative Arts	Film and Video
Lothar Osterburg	Creative Arts	Fine Arts
Jed Perl	Creative Arts	Biography
Philip Pettit	Humanities	Philosophy
Patrick Phillips	Creative Arts	Poetry
Simone Pinet	Social Sciences	Geography
Mariano Ben Plotkin	Social Sciences	Psychology
Jorge Ricardo Ponte	Humanities	Architecture - Planning
Marta Ptaszynska	Creative Arts	Music Composition
David Rhodes	Creative Arts	Fiction
Frances Rosenbluth	Social Sciences	Political Science
Jill Rosser	Creative Arts	Poetry
Federico Rubio	Creative Arts	Photography
Sarah Ruden	Humanities	Translation
Carl Safina	Natural Sciences	Science Writing
Alejandro F.Schinder	Natural Sciences	Neuroscience
Susan Schulten	Humanities	U.S. History
Michael Schultz	Creative Arts	Photography
Charlotte Schulz	Creative Arts	Fine Arts
Christine Schutt	Creative Arts	Fiction
Salvatore Scibona	Creative Arts	Fiction
Elizabeth Sears	Humanities	Fine Arts Research
Nadrian Seeman	Natural Sciences	Chemistry
Richard Serrano	Humanities	Literary Criticism
Nancy Shaver	Creative Arts	Fine Arts
Kerry Shaw	Natural Sciences	Organismic Biology & Ecology
Mary Sheriff	Humanities	French History
Carol Silverman	Humanities	Folklore & Popular Culture
Edward Simon	Creative Arts	Music Composition
Adam T. Smith	Humanities	Anthropology & Cultural Studies
Hyongsok Soh	Natural Sciences	Engineering
Dawn Song	Natural Sciences	Computer Science
Blane De St. Croix	Creative Arts	Fine Arts
Sarah Stanbury	Humanities	Medieval Literature
David Storey	Creative Arts	Fine Arts
Winnifred Sullivan	Humanities	Religion
Sebastian Szyd	Creative Arts	Photography
Maryam Tabrizian	Natural Sciences	Medicine & Health
Steven Takasugi	Creative Arts	Music Composition
Gordon Teskey	Humanities	English Literature
Morgan Thorson	Creative Arts	Choreography
Richard Tillinghast	Creative Arts	Poetry
Alexander Todorov	Social Sciences	Psychology
Camilla Townsend	Humanities	Iberian & Latin American History
Peter Trachtenberg	Creative Arts	General Nonfiction
Monique Truong	Creative Arts	Fiction
Anna Tsing	Humanities	Anthropology & Cultural Studies
Sebastian van Doesburg	Social Sciences	History
David Van Taylor	Creative Arts	Film
Lea VanderVelde	Social Sciences	Constitutional Studies
Victor Vich	Humanities	Literary Studies
Irene Vilar	Creative Arts	General Nonfiction
R. Jay Wallace	Humanities	Philosophy
Laura Walls	Creative Arts	Biography
Tandy Warnow	Natural Sciences	Computer Science
Kenny Werner	Creative Arts	Music Composition
John Wettlaufer	Natural Sciences	Applied Mathematics
James Whitman	Social Sciences	Law
John Witt	Social Sciences	Law
Matt Wolf	Creative Arts	Film
Shuhai Xiao	Natural Sciences	Earth Science
Yunxiang Yan	Humanities	East Asian Studies
David Zambrano	Creative Arts	Choreography
David Zeiger	Creative Arts	Film
John Zurier	Creative Arts	Fine Arts
Pavel Zustiak	Creative Arts	Choreography
