= Destroyer (disambiguation) =

A destroyer is a type of warship.

Destroyer may also refer to:

== Arts and entertainment ==
=== Characters ===
- Destroyer (comics), several characters from DC and Marvel Comics, including:
  - Destroyer (Marvel Comics), one of three superheroes to use the name
  - Destroyer (Thor), an Asgardian weapon in Marvel Comics
  - Alex Power or Destroyer, a member of the Marvel Comics team Power Pack
  - Jack Power (Marvel Comics) or Destroyer, a member of the Marvel Comics team Power Pack
- Destoroyah, or Destroyer, a Godzilla villain
- Destroyer, a massive golem from The Legend of Spyro: Dawn of the Dragon
- Destroyers, the main antagonists in the expansion pack Guild Wars: Eye of the North
- The Destroyer, the main antagonist in Darksiders

=== Film and television ===
- Destroyer (1943 film), an American black-and-white war film
- Destroyer (1988 film), an American horror film
- Destroyer (2018 film), an American crime film
- Saakshyam, a 2018 Telugu-language film, released in Hindi in 2020 as Pralay: The Destroyer
- "Destroyer" (Justice League Unlimited), a television episode

=== Games ===
- Destroyer (arcade game), a 1977 naval combat game by Atari
- Destroyer (video game), a 1986 naval combat game by Epyx
- Destroyer (dice game) or Ship, captain, and crew, a drinking game

=== Literature ===
- The Destroyer (novel series), an action-adventure novel series by Warren Murphy and Richard Sapir
- Destroyer, a 2005 novel in the Foreigner series by C. J. Cherryh
- The Destroyers, a 1974 novel by Douglas Reeman
- The Destroyers (novel), a 2017 novel by Christopher Bollen
- Destroyer (magazine), a Swedish English-language gay magazine
- Victor LaValle's Destroyer, a 2017 graphic novel

=== Music ===
- Ibanez Destroyer, an electric guitar

==== Performers ====
- Destroyer (band), a Canadian rock band fronted by Daniel Bejar
- The Destroyers, George Thorogood's band
- The Destroyers (band), British folk punk band

==== Albums ====
- Destroyer (Black Mountain album), 2019
- Destroyer (Gorgoroth album) or the title song, 1998
- Destroyer (Kiss album), 1976
- Destroyer (Led Zeppelin bootleg recording), 1977
- The Destroyer (Alec Empire album), 1996
- The Destroyer (Part 1), by TR/ST, 2019
- The Destroyer (Part 2), by TR/ST, or the title song, 2019

==== Songs ====
- "Destroyer" (The Kinks song), 1981
- "Destroyer" (Static-X song), 2007
- "Destroyer", by The Browning from End of Existence, 2021
- "Destroyer", by Design the Skyline from Nevaeh, 2011
- "Destroyer", by Enforcer from From Beyond, 2015
- "Destroyer", by Of Monsters and Men, 2021
- "Destroyer", by Parkway Drive from Ire, 2015
- "Destroyer", by Phantogram from Three, 2016
- "Destroyer", by Primal Fear from Domination, 2025
- "Destroyer", by Saint Motel from Saintmotelevision, 2016
- "Destroyer", by Twisted Sister from Under the Blade, 1982
- "Destroyer", by Unleash the Archers from Behold the Devastation, 2009
- "The Destroyer", by Frente! from Shape, 1996

== People ==
- Dick Beyer (1930–2019), ringname The Destroyer, American professional wrestler
- Rudy Distrito (born 1958), nickname The Destroyer, Filipino basketball player
- Shaun Wallace (born 1960), nickname The (Dark) Destroyer, British Barrister and a Chaser on The Chase.

== Religion ==
- Destroying angel (Bible), also known as "The Destroyer"
- Shiva the Destroyer, of Hindu tradition

== Sports ==
- Club Destroyers, a football club from Santa Cruz, Bolivia
- Columbus Destroyers, an Arena Football League team from Columbus, Ohio, US, 1999–2008 and 2019
- FC JAX Destroyers, a soccer team from Jacksonville, Florida, US, 2010–2012
- Mid-Michigan Destroyers, a Premier Basketball League team from Bay City, Michigan, US, 2009
- Virginia Destroyers, a United Football League team from Virginia Beach, Virginia, US, 2009–2012

== Weaponry ==
- Destroyer carbine, a Spanish rifle
- Douglas B-66 Destroyer, a US Air Force light bomber
- Douglas BTD Destroyer, a US Navy torpedo bomber
- Heavy fighter or Zerstörer (lit. Destroyer), a class of 1930s and 1940s German combat aircraft
- Gaztanaga Destroyer, a Spanish pistol

== Other uses ==
- Destroyer (magazine), Swedish magazine
- The Destroyer (painting), a 1971 painting by Frank Frazetta
