= Surrounded by Silence =

Surrounded by Silence may refer to

- Surrounded by Silence (album), an album by Prefuse 73.
- Surrounded by Silence (song), a song by Design the Skyline.
