= Karl Andersson (publisher) =

Swedish journalist

Karl Andersson is a Swedish researcher and former journalist. He founded and edited the Destroyer magazine from 2006 to 2010. He has served as the editor in chief of Straight, Sweden's first glossy magazine for gay men. He is the author of Impossibly Cute Boys: The Healing Power of Shota Comics in Japan (2024).

== Career ==
Anderson founded the biannual Destroyer magazine in 2006, which he published until its last issue in 2010. He wrote a book about his management of the publication, titled Gay Man's Worst Friend: The Story of Destroyer Magazine. In 2022, he published "Using masturbation as an ethnographic method in research on shota subculture in Japan" in Sage's Qualitative Research journal. The paper was retracted from the journal amid a Twitter controversy. In 2024, he published Impossibly Cute Boys: The Healing Power of Shota Comics in Japan.

== See Also ==
- Shotacon
