= Raboteau (surname) =

Raboteau is a surname. Notable people with the surname include:

- Albert J. Raboteau (1943–2021), American theologian
- Emily Raboteau (born 1976), American writer
