= Trey Lee =

Chinese cellist from Hong Kong

Trey Lee 李垂誼 (Chui-yee Lee) BBS MH JP
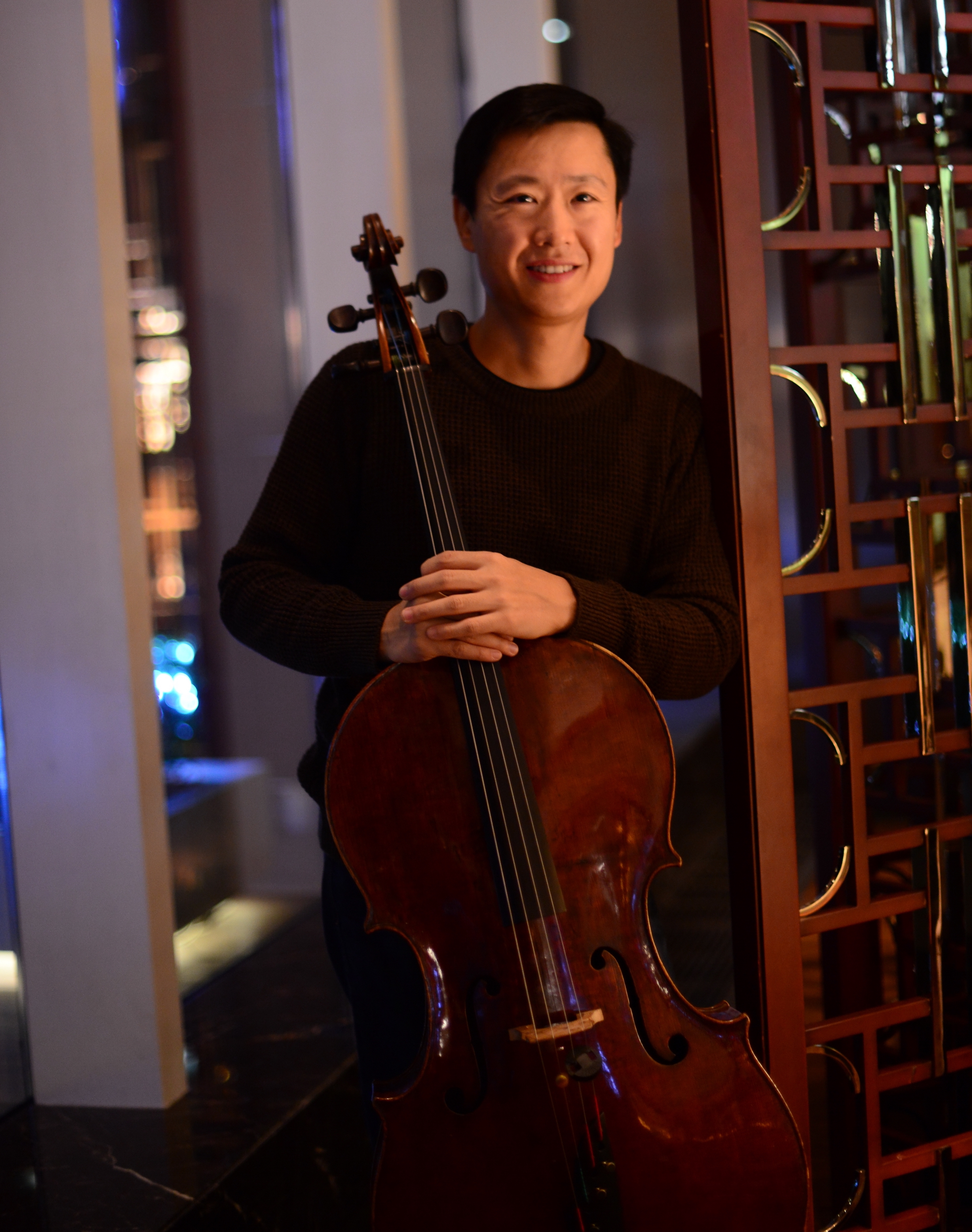
- 2014

Background information
- Born: Hong Kong
- Genres: Classical
- Occupation: Musician
- Instrument: Cello
- Label: Signum Records
- Website: trey-lee.com Instagram

Trey Lee BBS MH JP (Chinese:李垂誼; pinyin: Lǐ Chuíyí) is a Hong Kong-born cellist based in Berlin, Germany. A laureate of major international competitions, he appears as a featured soloist with orchestras and festivals all over the world. He is the founding artistic director of Musicus Society and has spearheaded several music festivals such as the Musicus Fest and the Hong Kong International Chamber Music Festival.

== Early life ==
Lee was born in Hong Kong into a musical family. His mother attended the Central Conservatory of Music in Beijing for piano and his two sisters attended the Juilliard School in New York City to study piano and violin. Lee spent much of his youth studying in the United States.

== Education ==
Lee first graduated from the Juilliard School Pre-College Division, and then went on to graduate from Harvard University with an AB in Economics. He continued his musical studies at New England Conservatory for his master's degree, later furthering his education in Europe at the Reina Sofía School of Music in Spain and the Cologne Musikhochschule in Germany. His teachers include Frans Helmerson, Laurence Lesser and Ardyth Alton.

== Career ==
After graduating from Harvard University, Lee spent one year working as a management consultant at Parthenon (now EY) before continuing his musical education and pursuing a musical career. His debut at Carnegie Hall’s Stern Auditorium/Perelman Stage won him a standing ovation, with New York Times critic Anthony Tommasini declaring him “the excellent cellist…with enveloping richness and lyrical sensitivity”. His performance in Seasons Interrupted, his 2024 album, was praised by BBC Music Magazine as “an exquisite delivery of the melody” with “an intoxicating intimacy”.

Lee appears at major venues worldwide, between 2024 and 2025 at the Beijing National Centre for the Performing Arts, London’s Cadogan Hall, Milan’s Duomo, Paris’s Salle Gaveau, Vienna’s Golden Hall Musikverein, Warsaw’s La Folle Journée, amongst others.

Lee has worked with well-known conductors, composers and orchestras worldwide, such as Lorin Maazel, Vladimir Ashkenazy, Yuri Bashmet, Leonard Slatkin, Hannu Lintu, Lü Jia, Santtu-Matias Rouvali, Vassily Sinaisky, Dima Slobodeniouk, Yan Huichang, Mikko Franck; the Philharmonics of BBC, Hong Kong, Netherlands and Radio France, Detroit Symphony, Hong Kong Chinese Orchestra, Camerata Salzburg, Sinfonia Varsovia, English Chamber Orchestra, Mantua Chamber Orchestra, Munich Chamber Orchestra, Romanian Radio Chamber Orchestra, Cameristi della Scala and Stuttgart Chamber Orchestra.

He is often invited as a featured artist at major events around the world, including a concert initiated by United Nations Secretary General Ban Ki-moon at the United Nations General Assembly Hall, alongside conductor Lu Jia, composer Tan Dun, and coloratura soprano Sumi Jo; and the first China tours of Detroit Symphony Orchestra under Leonard Slatkin and Beethoven Orchestra Bonn under Stefan Blunier. In 2014, he was invited for the launch of The IMAGINE Project at the UN General Assembly Hall with Yoko Ono, Hugh Jackman and ABBA's Björn Ulvaeus to commemorate the 25th anniversary of the United Nations Convention on the Rights of the Child. In 2020, Lee performed in a fundraising concert for anti-apartheid and human rights activist Denis Goldberg and his House of Hope Foundation in South Africa.

Lee has given world premieres of Kirmo Lintinen’s Cello Concerto (2010) and Bright Sheng’s The Blazing Mirage (2012), both dedicated to him. He was also featured as a soloist in the world premiere of Seung-Won Oh’s Umbra, a double concerto for cello, Ondes Martenot and string orchestra (2024).

As a multi-faceted artist, Lee has re-arranged Astor Piazzolla’s Four Seasons of Buenos Aires, first performed with the Trondheim Soloists in 2018. He also co-arranged Wang Liping’s The Dream of the Red Chamber Capriccio, which was premiered by Leonard Slatkin and the Detroit Symphony Orchestra.

Lee plays on the 1703 "Comte de Gabriac" cello by Venetian master maker Matteo Goffriller.

== TV ==
In 2004, Lee was featured in Radio Television Hong Kong's TV documentary Outstanding Young Chinese Musicians alongside pianists Lang Lang and Yundi Li. In 2011, Lee also appeared on a Phoenix Television global live broadcast concert with the China National Symphony Orchestra at the Beijing National Centre for the Performing Arts. In 2020, Lee recorded an exclusive concert for Deutsche Welle during the Covid lockdown.

== Honors and awards ==
Lee is a laureate of multiple major international competitions, including First Prize at the 2004 International Antonio Janigro Cello Competition. Prior to winning the Antonio Janigro competition, he won major prizes at New York's Naumburg Competition and Helsinki's International Paulo Competition.

Lee was appointed a UNICEF Hong Kong Ambassador since 2012.

== Discography ==
Collaborating with EMI, Naxos and Signum Records, Lee has released several albums and was a featured soloist on the original score recording for the German-Taiwan-Hong Kong co-produced film The Drummer, which was in competition at the Sundance Film Festival in 2008.

Lee's discography includes:

Year	Album	Details	Label
2004	Trey Lee	Performed with pianists Megumi Hashiba and Jarkko Riihimäki	EMI Classics
2006	Schumann, Mendelssohn, & Chopin	Performed with pianist Noreen Cassidy-Polera	EMI Classics
2007	The Drummer 戰‧鼓, Original Film Score		EMI Classics
2014	Bright Sheng: The Blazing Mirage	Performed with the Hong Kong Philharmonic led by Bright Sheng	Naxos
2018	The Dream of the Red Chamber and Other Works by Wang Liping	A collection of works by Wang Liping	
2024	Seasons Interrupted	Performed with English Chamber Orchestra	Signum Records

== Musicus Society ==
Lee co-founded Musicus Society in 2010 with his sister Chui-Inn Lee. It is a charitable organization based in Hong Kong with the mission of promoting cross-cultural collaboration through music. In 2013, he co-founded Musicus Fest, an annual international music festival; and in 2022, he founded Musicus Soloists Hong Kong, an ensemble comprising young emerging string players from Hong Kong, as the group’s artistic director.
