= Destroyer (comics) =

Destroyer, in comics, may refer to:

== DC Comics ==
- "Destroyer" (Justice League), the series finale episode of Justice League Unlimited

== Marvel Comics ==
- Destroyer (Keen Marlow), a WW2 era superhero from Marvel Comics' predecessor, Timely Comics
- Destroyer (Roger Aubrey), Marvel Comics character who adopts Keen Marlow's identity
- Destroyer MAX, five-issue limited 2009 series from Marvel MAX, by Robert Kirkman, starring a modern day Keen Marlow
- The Destroyer (novel series), a paperback series of novels, which had a comics miniseries. It is unrelated to the above.
- Destroyer (Thor), the Asgardian weapon seen in Marvel Comics, usually opposed to Thor
- Drax the Destroyer, the Marvel Comics character
- Destroyer, a codename used by two members of the Marvel Comics sibling team, Power Pack

== Boom! Studios ==
- Victor LaValle's Destroyer, a limited series written by Victor Lavalle about Frankenstein's legacy.

== See also ==
- Destroyer (disambiguation)
