= Lea VanderVelde =

American legal scholar and historian

- Occupations: Legal scholar; historian
- Spouse: Johannes Ledolter
- Awards: Guggenheim Fellowship (2010)

Academic background
- Education: University of Wisconsin–Madison (BA); University of Wisconsin Law School (JD)

Academic work
- Sub-discipline: Labor law; employment law; American slavery
- Institutions: University of Iowa

Lea VanderVelde is an American legal scholar and historian. She has written or co-authored several legal texts, and is a full professor at the University of Iowa College of Law. She is author of Mrs. Dred Scott: A Life on Slavery's Frontier (2009) and Redemption Songs: Suing for Freedom before Dred Scott (2014), and is a 2010 Guggenheim Fellow in constitutional studies.

== Biography ==
Lea VanderVelde was born to Harry and Deloris VanderVelde. She obtained a BS from the University of Wisconsin–Madison in 1974.

After her undergraduate studies, VanderVelde went to University of Wisconsin Law School, where she got a JD in 1978, and was an intern for Wisconsin Supreme Court justice William G. Callow (1978) and senior law clerk for US District Judge Harold Duane Vietor (1979–1980). She subsequently joined the University of Iowa, where she eventually became a full professor and distinguished chair. She was the 2019–2020 May Brodbeck Humanities Fellow at UI.

VanderVelde's research specializes in labor and employment law. She authored and co-authored several legal texts, including Human Resources and the Law (1994), Employment Law (1994), Cases and Text on Property (2000), Analyzing Textual Information: From Words to Meanings through Numbers (2021), and Modern Employment Law: In Time and Place (2022). She is a life fellow of the American Law Institute, as well as a member of the Wisconsin Bar and the Labor Law Group.

In addition to legal scholarship, VanderVelde has also conducted research in American slavery, releasing two books in the process. In 2009, she published Mrs. Dred Scott: A Life on Slavery's Frontier, centered on the life of Harriet Robinson Scott. In 2010, she was awarded a Guggenheim Fellowship in Constitutional Studies. She discovered the records of hundreds of freedom suits in St. Louis during research, and in 2014 published a book that analyzes twelve of them: Redemption Songs: Suing for Freedom before Dred Scott. She won the American Journal of Legal History's inaugural 2020 Alfred L. Brophy Prize for her article "The Anti-Republican Origins of the At-Will Doctrine".

VanderVelde met children's rights activist Kailash Satyarthi while his daughter attended UI; the two connected "over his passion for fighting slavery – one of her areas of research", and she visited his ashram during a three-week vacation in his native India. Alongside Iowa senator Tom Harkin, she nominated Satyarthi for the Nobel Peace Prize in 2005, and then every year until he was awarded the 2014 Nobel Peace Prize.

VanderVelde lives in Iowa City. She has two children with her husband Johannes Ledolter. She advocated for prenatal screening for Group B streptococcal infections after her newborn daughter Sara died of the disease in October 1989.

== Works ==
- (with Mark A. Rothstein) Human Resources and the Law (1994)
- (with Mark A. Rothstein, Charles B. Craver, Elinor Schroeder, and Elaine W. Shoben) Employment Law (1994)
- (with A. James Casner, W. Barton Leach, Susan F. French, and Gerald Korngold) Cases and Text on Property (2000)
- Mrs. Dred Scott: A Life on Slavery's Frontier (2009) (Note: Reviews of this book:)
- Redemption Songs: Suing for Freedom before Dred Scott (2014) (Note: Reviews of this book:)
- (with Johannes Ledolter) Analyzing Textual Information: From Words to Meanings through Numbers (2021)
- Modern Employment Law: In Time and Place (2022)
