= Mark Nowak =

American poet

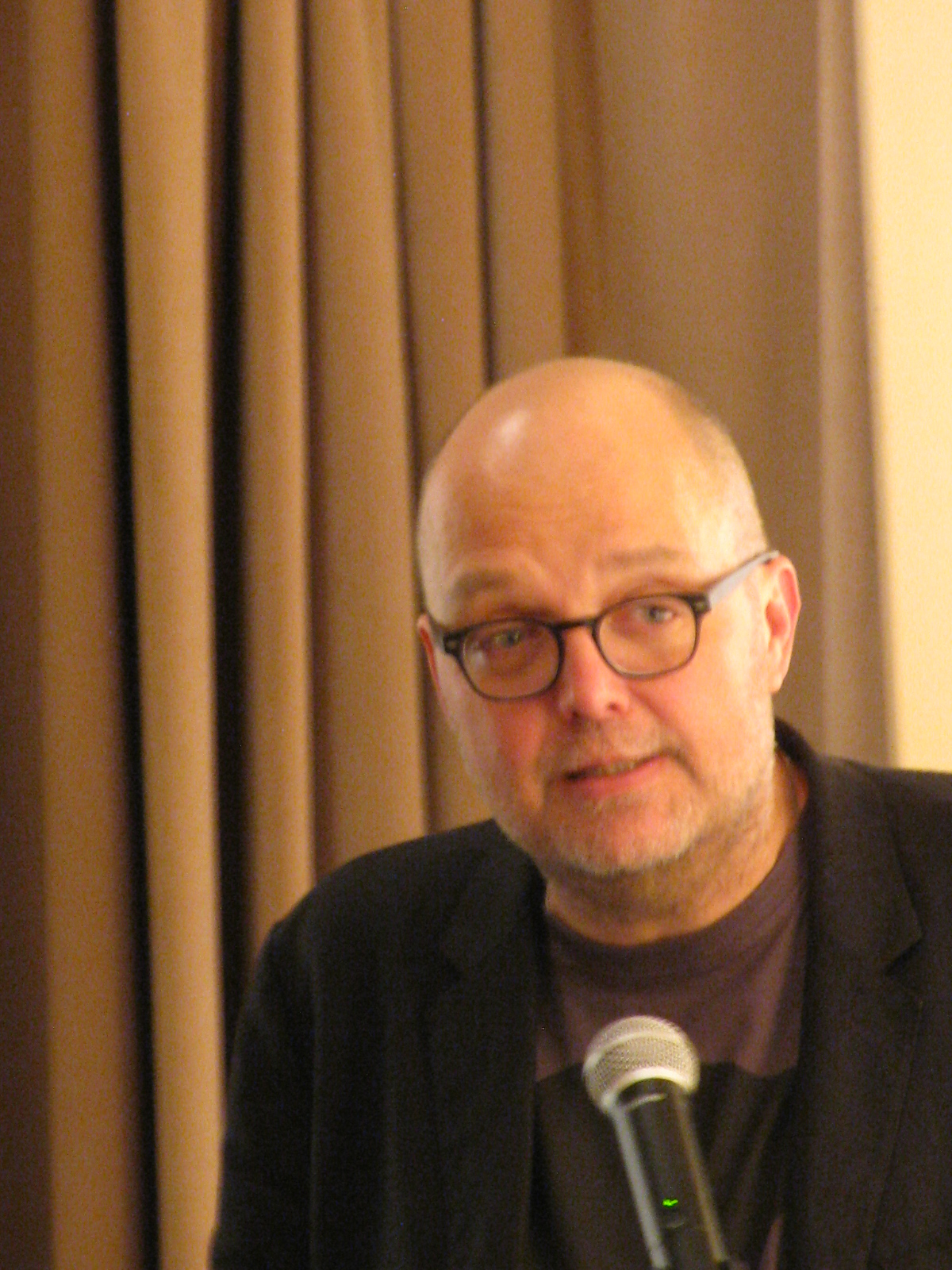
- Writing career
- Genre: poetry
- Notable awards: Guggenheim Fellowship

Mark Nowak is an American poet, as well as cultural critic, playwright and essayist, from Buffalo, New York. Nowak is a professor in the English Department at Manhattanville College in Purchase, NY.

== Awards ==
- 2010 Guggenheim Fellowship
- 2015 Freedom Plow Award
- 2015 Lannan Literary Fellowship

== Works ==
- —— (2004). Revenants. Coffee House Press. ISBN 978-1-56689-107-3.
- —— (2004). Shut Up Shut Down: Poems. Coffee House Press. ISBN 978-1-56689-163-9.
- —— (2009). Coal Mountain Elementary. Coffee House Press. ISBN 978-1-56689-228-5.
- —— (2020). Social Poetics. Coffee House Press. ISBN 978-1-56689-567-5.
