= Nevaeh (album) =

Studio album by Design the Skyline
- Released: August 16, 2011
- Recorded: May to July 2011
- Studio: Precision Studios, Corpus Christi, Texas
- Genre: Deathcore; metalcore; avant-garde metal
- Length: 30:39
- Label: Victory
- Producer: Robert Beltran

Singles from Nevaeh
- 1. "Break Free from Your Life" Released: July 26, 2011

Professional ratings
Review scores
Source	Rating
LMP Magazine	4/10
The Metal Forge	7/10 stars
Mind Equals Blown	0.5/5 stars
The New Review	3/5 stars
Rock Freaks	3/10
Thrash Magazine	6.9/10
Under the Gun Review	0/10

Nevaeh is the only album by Design the Skyline. It was released on August 16, 2011 through Victory Records.

== Background ==
The band had ideas to start work on a debut album after changing their name from Extra Large Kids to Design the Skyline. Initially the members set plans to release a full-length titled, Synthetic Cities which even had its own artwork completed along with many of its songs recorded and planned but were never fully finished or mastered. The project was abandoned. The reason for this was due to the band aspiring to pursue a completely different and more "mature" sound than what they had originally interpreted after their signing to Victory in May.

Nevaeh was then written and recorded by the course of May through July 2011. The album spawned two singles; "Break Free from Your Life" and "Cybernetic Strawflower" before its release.

== Sound and musical structure ==
The band has cited The Doors and Led Zeppelin as some of the influences for the album's musical structure.

== Reception ==
The critical reaction to Nevaeh was mostly mixed, with praise going toward's the band's dramatic sound change from that of the sound displayed on "Surrounded by Silence", but criticism for the album's production as well as its "generic" material.

Colin McNamara of The Metal Forge gave the album a seven out of ten, saying that Nevaeh "will attract listeners who are sick of the usual deathcore formula" and that the album's musicianship was "well-rounded and each track approaches in a furious, [yet] innovative way." Thrashmag.com gave the album three stars out of a possible five, saying that Design the Skyline "really shows prowess in their experimental side" and that "Nevaeh shows glimmers of hope for those who want something to remember." In the most critical review of the album, James Shotwell of UnderTheGunReview.net gave the album a zero out of 10, saying that Nevaeh was "simply not that good". However, many readers of the site were critical of the review itself. Aleksi Pertola of Rockfreaks.net also gave the album a negative review, saying "it is a haphazard mish mash of all things popular in the scene at the moment, with left foot in deathcore, right foot in electronically enhanced post-hardcore, and middle foot in a Hot Topic groupie's mouth."

== Track listing ==
No.	Title	Length
1.	"Crystal Swords Kill the Hordes"	5:00
2.	"Reality Away"	3:00
3.	"Destroyer"	3:27
4.	"Cybernetic Strawflower"	2:41
5.	"Break Free from Your Life"	3:01
6.	"Reverie" (instrumental)	3:11
7.	"Witch of the Woods"	2:48
8.	"Free for Infinity"	1:45
9.	"Under the Blood Driven Moon"	2:20
10.	"Nevaeh" (instrumental)	3:26
Total length:		30:39

== Personnel ==
Design the Skyline

- Eric Azure – lead vocals
- Daniel "Dani Doom" Garza – lead vocals
- Matt Ryan – lead guitar, programming
- Julian "Julian Reckless" Ibanez – rhythm guitar
- Ethan White – bass guitar, clean vocals on "Break Free from Your Life"
- James "Keebler" Lemos – keyboards, synthesizers
- John "Martian" Perkins – drums

Production

- Produced, mixed and mastered by Robert Beltran
