= Barbara Hamby =

American writer

Barbara Hamby (born 1952) is an American poet, fiction writer, editor, and critic.

== Life ==
She was born in New Orleans and raised in Hawaii. Her poems have been printed in numerous publications and her first book of poetry, Delirium (1995), received literary recognition. She lives with her husband and fellow poet David Kirby in Tallahassee, Florida, where she is a writer-in-residence in the Creative Writing Program, and he a professor, both with the English Department at Florida State University.

== Awards and honors ==
- 2010 Guggenheim Fellowship
- 2010 Iowa Short Fiction Award
- Donald Hall Prize in Poetry (Association of Writers and Writing Programs, 2003) for Babel
- New York University Poetry Prize (1998) for The Alphabet of Desire
- Kate Tufts Discovery Award (1996) for Delirium
- Norma Farber First Book Award (Poetry Society of America) for Delirium
- Vassar Miller Prize for Delirium

== Bibliography ==
=== Poetry ===
Collections

- Delirium : poems. Denton, Tex.: University of North Texas Press. 1995.
- The Alphabet of Desire (New York: New York University Press, 1999, ISBN 0-8147-3597-5, paperback ISBN 0-8147-3598-3)
- Babel: poems (Pittsburgh: University of Pittsburgh Press, 2004, ISBN 0-8229-5859-7)
- All-Night Lingo Tango: poems (Pittsburgh: University of Pittsburgh Press, 2009, ISBN 0-8229-6017-6)
- On the Street of Divine Love: New and Selected Poems (Pittsburgh: University of Pittsburgh Press, 2014, ISBN 0-8229-6288-8)
- Bird Odyssey (Pittsburgh: University of Pittsburgh Press, 2018, ISBN 0-8229-6525-9)
- Holoholo (Pittsburgh: University of Pittsburgh Press, 2021, ISBN 9780822966586)

Anthologies (edited)

- Seriously Funny: poetry anthology edited with David Kirby (Athens: University of Georgia Press, 2010, ISBN 0-8203-3569-X)

List of poems

Title	Year	First published	Reprinted/collected
Athena ode	2016	Hamby, Barbara (January 25, 2016). "Athena ode". The New Yorker. 91 (45): 42.	
Ode on luck	2022	Hamby, Barbara (May 30, 2022). "Ode on luck". The New Yorker. 98 (14): 38–39.	

=== Short fiction ===
Collections

- Lester Higata's 20th Century: stories (Iowa City: University of Iowa Press, 2010, ISBN 1-58729-918-6)

=== Critical studies and reviews of Hamby's work ===
On the Street of Divine Love

- On the Street of Divine Love: New and Selected Poems, New York Journal of Books
