= Vincent Grenier =

Vincent Grenier (1948–2023) was a Canadian avant-garde filmmaker.

== Biography ==
Vincent Grenier was born in 1948 in Quebec City, to Robert Grenier and Huguette Lacroix. He moved to San Francisco in 1970, where he attended the San Francisco Art Institute. He earned a Master of Fine Arts in filmmaking in 1972.

Grenier ran the San Francisco Cinematheque from 1974 to 1975. He focused on its curatorial activities and was influential in establishing the reputation of its exhibition program nationally and internationally. Grenier took teaching jobs at SFAI, the Art Institute of Chicago, the University of Wisconsin–Milwaukee, and Adelphi University. He taught at Binghamton University from 1999 until his retirement in 2021. Grenier was awarded a Guggenheim Fellowship in 2010. He died on November 2, 2023, from large-cell lymphoma.

== Films ==
Grenier completed more than fifty film and video works. His early films from the 1970s were part of the waning structural film movement, with a focus on movement and geometry and a prominent use of negative space. He often balanced abstraction and representation within a film, moving between the two through small changes. Critic J. Hoberman described his work from this period as "extraordinarily subtle and elusive, even in the context of other reductionist filmmakers."

Grenier made a series of short vérité-style portraits of friends in the 1990s. As he made the transition from film to video, he began working with superimpositions, dissolves, and dense soundtracks. After Grenier settled in Ithaca, his films captured his home there, as well as the local community. Michael Sicinski compared Grenier's work to Objectivist poetry, in that it "both describes and reconfigures its subject."
