= Susan Schulten =

American historian

- Education: University of California, Berkeley (BA); University of Pennsylvania (PhD)
- Occupations: Historian; professor

Susan Schulten is an American historian, and professor at the University of Denver.

She graduated from the University of California, Berkeley, with a B.A., and from the University of Pennsylvania, with a PhD.

Professor Schulten teaches courses on Lincoln, the Civil War and Reconstruction, the history of American ideas and culture, the Great Depression, the Cold War, the American west, war and the presidency, and the methods and philosophy of history.

She is a current member of the Colorado State Historian's Council.

== Awards ==
- 2010 Guggenheim Fellowship

== Works ==
- The geographical imagination in America, 1880-1950, University of Chicago Press, 2001, ISBN 978-0-226-74056-0
- Mapping the Nation: History and Cartography in Nineteenth-Century America, University of Chicago Press, 2012, ISBN 978-0-226-74070-6
- A History of America in 100 Maps, University of Chicago Press, 2012, ISBN 9780226458618
