= Charles Lindsay (artist) =

American multi-disciplinary artist (born 1961)

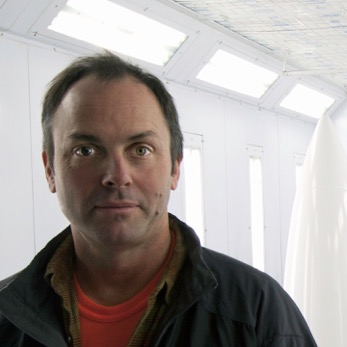
- Born: April 22, 1961; San Francisco, California
- Education: University of Western Ontario, Canada
- Known for: Photography, Multi-Media Installations + Sound Art
- Awards: Guggenheim Fellowship

Charles Lindsay (born San Francisco, California, 1961) is an American multi-disciplinary artist whose work focuses on technology, biomimicry, semiotics, and the possibility of new ontologies. He creates immersive environments, sound installations, and sculptures built from salvaged aerospace and bio-tech equipment, photographs, and videos.

Charles Lindsay is the current director of the SETI Institute's artist in residence program, a Guggenheim Fellow, recipient of the Robert Rauschenberg Residency, and a Fellow at the Nevada Museum of Art's Center for Art and Environment. Lindsay balances his time in the studio with extended periods exploring remote natural environments. His career has ranged from exploration geology in the arctic to photojournalism in the jungles of southeast Asia - where he lived for years with a Stone Age tribe. He is director of OSA EARS - a project designed to stream real-time sound from one of the world's most bio-diverse ecosystems, the Osa Peninsula in Costa Rica.

Lindsay invented a carbon-based imaging process for which he received a 2010 Guggenheim Fellowship. "CARBON" has since morphed into a series of immersive installations. Lindsay's photographs have appeared in numerous international publications including Wired, The New York Times Magazine, Motherboard, Blind Spot, Aperture, Natural History, Gastronomica, Audubon, Parabola, Orion, Big Sky Journal, Men's Journal, Golf, Sports Illustrated, and GEO. He has been profiled on National Public Radio, CNN International and NHK Japan in a one-hour television documentary.

Lindsay has presented and performed at Ear to the Earth, the Zero1 Biennial in San Francisco, the LED Lab, the Bolinas Museum, and at ISEA in New Mexico. He has lectured at Moogfest 2014, the California Academy of Sciences, Stanford's Department of Art and Art History, 100 Year Starship Symposium (DARPA), USC's "Visions + Voices" performance series, SwissNex, the American Museum of Natural History, Mountain Film in Telluride, The School of Visual Arts, Pratt School of Art and Design, the Open Center in New York, IDEA CITY in Toronto and at The Hat Creek Observatory for SETI.

He is a member of the Electronic Music Foundation, increasingly using audio recordings he gathers in the wild in order to create sounds for his installations, videos and live audio visual performances.

== Awards ==
- 2010 Guggenheim Fellowship
- Robert Rauschenberg Residency 2015
- Imagine Science Films Residency 2014-2015
