= The Ballad of Black Tom =

2016 novella by Victor LaValle

- First edition cover art
- Author: Victor LaValle
- Cover artist: Robert Hunt
- Language: English
- Genre: Horror, Historical fantasy
- Set in: New York City
- Published: February 16, 2016
- Publisher: Tor.com
- Publication place: United States
- Pages: 149
- Awards: 2016 Shirley Jackson Award for Best Novella; 2017 British Fantasy Award for Best Novella

The Ballad of Black Tom is a 2016 fantasy-horror novella by Victor LaValle, revisiting H. P. Lovecraft's story "The Horror at Red Hook" from the viewpoint of a Black man. The book won the 2016 Shirley Jackson Award for Best Novella and the 2017 British Fantasy Award for Best Novella.

== Plot summary ==
Charles Thomas “Tommy” Tester is a hustler. He delivers an occult book from his home in Harlem to Ma Att, who lives in Queens. Tommy secretly removed the final page prior to delivery, rendering the book harmless. An elderly man named Robert Suydam sees Tommy busking. Suydam hires Tommy to perform at a party at his home in Flatbush. Tommy is accosted by a police officer, Inspector Malone, and a private detective, Mr. Howard; they claim that Suydam is under investigation.

Later, Tommy visits Suydam’s mansion. Suydam tells Tommy about the Sleeping King and the Great Old Ones. Suydam transports his home Outside of reality. Tommy sees a terrifying vision of unknown cosmic forces, as well as a vision of Detective Malone, before the house returns to its proper place in spacetime. Tommy returns home to find Malone and Howard at his apartment building; they had been hired to retrieve the missing page from Ma Att’s book. Howard has shot Tommy’s father in “self defense,” claiming that he was brandishing a weapon that was in fact only a guitar.

Tommy returns to Suydam’s house and plays guitar at the party. Suydam transports his home Outside and asks his guests to awaken the Sleeping King, which will grant them untold power. An emotionally exhausted Tommy opens the doors of the house, steps Outside, and closes the door behind him.

Meanwhile, Malone and Howard return the stolen page to Ma Att. The psychically sensitive Malone believes that Ma Att is a mask hiding a more terrifying presence. Suydam abandons his house in Flatbush and occupies three tenement buildings in Red Hook, along with a group of criminals. While Malone goes to investigate Suydam’s new residence, Tommy, now going by Black Tom and serving as Suydam’s second-in-command, orders Malone to leave. Tommy goes to retrieve the book from Ma Att and Malone follows. When Malone arrives, he finds that Black Tom has retrieved the book and has used its power to banish Ma Att to the Outside. Malone summons a squadron of officers to go to Suydam’s tenements in Red Hook. In the basement of the tenements, he sees what appears to be an altar and encounters Suydam and Black Tom.

The police officers begin shelling the tenements with machine guns as Black Tom slits Suydam’s throat. Black Tom has already killed Howard and used his blood to paint the Supreme Alphabet on the walls of the basement. Tom cuts off Malone’s eyelids, preventing him from closing his eyes against the horrors of the Outside. Black Tom kills several officers before disappearing, preferring the company of creatures such as Cthulhu to other humans.

The tenements collapse; Malone is the only known survivor. Malone’s medical team tries to convince him that his visions were the result of stress, but he cannot forget what he saw under the tenements. Black Tom is seen again briefly in Harlem, but disappears once more. His body is never found.

== Reception ==
Slate called it "riveting", "clever", and "compelling", and noted LaValle's comparison of "cosmic indifference" to targeted racist malice and brutality. Vice described it as "tightly written, beautifully creepy, and politically resonant", and emphasized that despite its nature as a literary "rebuttal", it is still "a thrilling Lovecraftian tale of mystery, monsters, and madness".

Nina Allan commended LaValle for "making (...) 'The Horror at Red Hook' (into) an actual story (...) featuring real characters with real motivations – a claim that can not safely be made for the original tale", but observed that — when compared to the vivid "lunacy" of Lovecraft's writing — LaValle's prose is "grounded and sound in both mind and body" and ultimately "pedestrian". Conversely, the Philadelphia Inquirer preferred LaValle's "sharp and direct sentences" to Lovecraft's "spongy prose".

Awards and honors
Year	Award	Category	Result	Ref.
2016	Bram Stoker Award	Long Fiction	Nominated	
2016	Nebula Award	Nebula Award for Best Novella	Nominated	
2016	Shirley Jackson Award	Novella	Won	
2017	British Fantasy Award	Novella	Won	
2017	Hugo Award	Novella	Finalist	
2017	Theodore Sturgeon Award	—	Finalist	
2017	World Fantasy Award	Novella	Nominated	

== Adaptations ==
In 2017, AMC announced that it was planning a TV adaptation of The Ballad of Black Tom, with LaValle as co-executive producer.
