= The Changeling (TV series) =

Horror fantasy television series

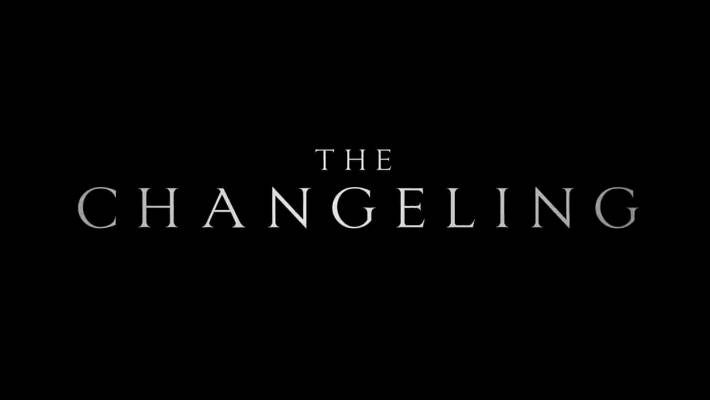
- Genre: Horror; Fantasy
- Created by: Kelly Marcel
- Based on: The Changeling by Victor LaValle
- Written by: Kelly Marcel
- Starring: LaKeith Stanfield; Adina Porter; Clark Backo; Samuel T. Herring; Jared Abrahamson; Alexis Louder
- Narrated by: Victor LaValle
- Theme music composer: Dan Deacon
- Composer: Dan Deacon
- Country of origin: United States
- Original language: English
- No. of seasons: 1
- No. of episodes: 8

Production
- Executive producers: Kelly Marcel; Melina Matsoukas; David Knoller; Megan Ellison; Sue Naegle; Patrick Chu; Ali Krug; David Wolkis; Lakeith Stanfield; Jonathan van Tulleken; Victor LaValle
- Running time: 29–57 minutes
- Production companies: Black Magnolia; Rosebud Pictures; De La Revolution Films; Annapurna Television; Apple Studios

Original release
- Network: Apple TV+
- Release: September 8 – October 13, 2023

The Changeling is an American horror fantasy television series created by Kelly Marcel and directed by Melina Matsoukas based on the novel of the same name by Victor LaValle for Apple TV+. It premiered on September 8, 2023, with the first three episodes.

== Premise ==
A man goes in search of his wife after she does something horrific in the aftermath of the birth of their first child.

== Cast ==
=== Main ===
- LaKeith Stanfield as Apollo Kagwa, a used book dealer
- Adina Porter as Lillian Kagwa, Apollo's mother
  - Alexis Louder as young Lillian Kagwa
- Clark Backo as Emma "Emmy" Valentine, Apollo's pregnant wife
- Samuel T. Herring as William Wheeler, a man who befriends Apollo in a quest to win back his wife and children
- Jared Abrahamson as Brian West, a parole officer, Apollo's father and Lillian’s husband

=== Recurring ===
- Amirah Vann as Kim Valentine, Emma's sister and sole family member
- Malcolm Barrett as Patrice Green, Apollo’s best friend, ex-veteran and fellow book enthusiast
- Elena Hurst as Yurina
- Emy Coligado as Carlotta

=== Guest ===
- Daphne Rubin-Vega as Mrs. Ortiz
- Michelle Giroux as Gretta
- Karen Giordano as Sheryl
- Kim Roberts as Alice
- Dennis Andres as Leif
- Christine Spang as June
- Sonia Dhillon Tully as Dr. Calero
- Joris Jarsky as Sam Valentine
- Adam Augslander as David Krug
- Tom Rooney as Father Hagen
- Jane Kaczmarek as Cal
- Teca Pereira as Old Washer Woman

== Episodes ==
No.	Title	Directed by	Written by	Original release date
1	"First Comes Love"	Melina Matsoukas	Kelly Marcel	September 8, 2023
2	"Then Comes a Baby in a Baby Carriage"	Jonathan van Tulleken	Kelly Marcel	September 8, 2023
3	"*"	Jonathan van Tulleken	Kelly Marcel	September 8, 2023
4	"The Wise Ones"	Dana Gonzales	Kelly Marcel	September 15, 2023
5	"This Woman's Work"	Jonathan van Tulleken	Kelly Marcel	September 22, 2023
6	"Aftermath"	Jonathan van Tulleken	Kelly Marcel	September 29, 2023
7	"Stormy Weather"	Michael Francis Williams	Kelly Marcel	October 6, 2023
8	"Battle of the Island"	Solvan "Slick" Naim	Kelly Marcel	October 13, 2023

Melina Matsoukas, Jonathan van Tulleken, Dana Gonzales and Slick Naim directed the episodes.

== Production ==
Annapurna Pictures acquired the rights to the novel in August 2017, with the intention to turn it into a television series. In August 2021, Apple TV+ greenlit the series, with Kelly Marcel writing the series and serving as showrunner, Melina Matsoukas directing and Lakeith Stanfield cast to star. Adina Porter and Clark Backo were added to the cast in March 2022. In June, musician Samuel T. Herring joined the cast. Malcolm Barrett, Alexis Louder, Amirah Vann and Jared Abrahamson would be cast in recurring roles in July.

Filming on the series began by May 2022 in New Jersey under the working title Improbable Valentine. Filming locations included Hoboken, Jersey City, and New York City, as well as Toronto and London, Ontario.

== Reception ==
The review aggregator website Rotten Tomatoes reported a 74% approval score with an average rating of 6.95/10 based on 73 reviews. The website's critics consensus reads, "Grounded by a superb LaKeith Stanfield, The Changeling is an ambitious fairy tale that may be too scattershot in its tonality but never lacks for imagination or spirit." Metacritic, which uses a weighted average, assigned a score of 64 out of 100 based on 33 critics, indicating "generally favorable reviews".

=== Accolades ===
At the 39th Independent Spirit Awards Adina Porter was nominated for Best Supporting Performance in a New Scripted Series while Clark Backo for Best Breakthrough Performance in a New Scripted Series.
