= The Changeling (LaValle novel) =

2017 fantasy/horror novel by Victor LaValle

- First edition
- Author: Victor LaValle
- Cover artist: Yuko Shimizu
- Language: English
- Genre: Horror/fantasy
- Publisher: Spiegel & Grau
- Publication date: June 13, 2017
- Publication place: United States
- Media type: Novel
- Pages: 431
- Awards: British Fantasy Award for Best Horror Novel (August Derleth Award); Dragon Award; Locus Award; World Fantasy Award
- ISBN: 9780812995947 (1st ed hardcover)
- Dewey Decimal: 813/.54
- LC Class: LCC PS3562.A8458 C48 2017

The Changeling is a 2017 fantasy horror novel by Victor LaValle. The novel received critical acclaim, winning awards including the 2017 Dragon Award for Best Horror Novel, 2018 British Fantasy Award for Best Horror Novel (August Derleth Award), 2018 Locus Award for Best Horror Novel, and 2018 World Fantasy Award—Novel. The novel was adapted into a television show of the same name which premiered in 2023.

== Plot summary ==
Lillian Kagwa and Brian West meet in New York City in 1968. In September 1977, they have a son, Apollo. By the time Apollo is 4, Brian has disappeared. In 1989, 12 year old Apollo receives a cardboard box labeled “Improbabilia” which contains mementos from his father’s life as well as a copy of Outside Over There from Apollo’s childhood. This incident inspires him to become a rare book dealer.

Apollo falls in love with a librarian named Emma Valentine. They eventually marry and have a son named Brian. Emma begins having disturbing thoughts that Brian is not really her son and has been replaced by a changeling. Emma and Apollo fight. Apollo contemplates leaving with his son, but falls asleep. He awakens to find himself chained to the radiator. Emma breaks his jaw with a hammer and kills Brian before disappearing. A grief-stricken Apollo holds several of Emma’s coworkers hostage, demanding to know where she has gone. Apollo is convicted and spends two months incarcerated at Rikers Island.

Apollo and his business partner Patrice sell a rare book to William Wheeler. Wheeler tells Apollo that he knows Emma’s whereabouts. Together, they go to North Brother Island. Apollo is captured by a group of women and brought to Callisto, or “Cal”, their leader. All of these women have similar stories; they all killed a child that they believed was replaced with a changeling. Wheeler attacks the compound. Cal tells Apollo to visit Brian’s grave, and that Emma is searching for Brian in the forest. She stays behind as Apollo and the rest of the compound members flee.

Apollo and Patrice dig up Brian’s grave. Instead of a corpse they find a creature composed of hair, bones, and teeth. Apollo goes to Forest Hills, Queens in search of Emma. He encounters a Norwegian man named Jorgen. Jorgen tells Apollo about the Restauration, an 1801 sloop that brought a group of Norwegian immigrants to the USA. Jorgen's ancestor Nils brought a troll with him from Norway in order to ensure safe passage for his ship. In exchange, Nils and his descendants, including Jorgen, began kidnapping children and giving them to the troll, a cycle that has been ongoing for centuries. William Wheeler is Jorgen’s son. Apollo kills Jorgen.

Apollo finds Emma in the woods. They return to Jorgen’s house, and Apollo calls Lillian, who reveals that Apollo's father Brian attempted to kill Apollo after she served him with divorce papers, so she killed him to defend her son. Apollo and Emma then find Jorgen's son Wheeler in the basement. He has been streaming a dark web video feed of their son, in which viewers pay for access and wait for Brian to be eaten by the troll. Emma kills Wheeler. They burn the house down and escape through a tunnel in the basement and find the troll’s cave. They attempt to rescue Brian, but the troll eats him. Apollo cuts Brian from the troll’s stomach, and the troll turns to stone as the sun rises. Apollo and Emma return home with their rescued son.

== Reception ==
In a review of The Changeling in Locus magazine, American author John Langan wrote that there is "a deep humanity" in The Changeling that remains with you long after finishing it. He said several authors, including Ramsey Campbell, Stephen King and Peter Straub have explored how people respond to horror, and LaValle makes "a significant contribution to this tradition" in The Changeling. Langan said this is a fairy tale, but not the traditional "sanitized [and] moralistic" tale: it "flips the script of so many narratives of the fantastic" and draws instead on Scandinavian folklore.

American film critic Terrence Rafferty said The Changeling is a "strange and wonderful new novel". Writing in The New York Times, he called the book a "rambunctious fairy-tale epic", but of the "old kind" where there are no "happily ever after" endings. Rafferty said LaValle periodically shatters the readers' "happily-ever-after reverie" with horrors and catastrophes, and the truth "about the anxieties and ambivalences of modern parenting, the psychological value of the stories we tell ourselves and our children, and the rigors of survival in urban America." Rafferty stated that many of the characters in The Changeling are descendants of immigrants, and the novel is "rich in the ambiguous history of [New York City] ... [and] its noisy, clamorous setting."

In a review in The Guardian, James Smart called The Changeling a "punchy cocktail of modern parenting and ancient magic". He liked the role technology plays in the novel, and described New York City as "arguably the book’s strongest character". Smart felt he would have liked the villains to have had "a little more oomph", but added, "LaValle hooks the reader deep into his increasingly eldritch thriller."

Kirkus Reviews described The Changeling as a "smart and knotty merger of horror, fantasy, and realism", and added that "this blend of horror story and fatherhood fable is surprising and admirably controlled". The review said that while the plot can be "labyrinthine", the pieces all connect in the end. It concluded, "LaValle has successfully delivered a tale of wonder and thoughtful exploration of what it means to be a parent."

== Awards ==
Year	Award		Result	Ref
2017	Dragon Award	Horror Novel	Won	
2018	American Book Award	—	Won	
2018	British Fantasy Award	Horror Novel (August Derleth Award)	Won	
2018	Locus Award	Horror Novel	Won (1st)	
2018	Mythopoeic Awards	Adult Novel	Nominated	
2018	Shirley Jackson Award	Novel	Nominated	
2018	World Fantasy Award	Novel	Won (tie)	

=== Other citations ===
The Changeling was seventh in Time magazine's "Top 10 Novels of 2017" and among The New York Times Book Review's "100 Notable Books of 2017." In 2021, NPR fielded poll "A Decade of Great Sci-Fi and Fantasy", with it being noted.

== Adaptations ==
In 2018, FX announced that it was planning a TV adaptation of The Changeling. The series would be a co-production with Annapurna Television with Kelly Marcel attached to pen the script. In 2021, Apple TV+ announced a series order for the show, with Lakeith Stanfield to star and executive produce. The series premiered on September 8, 2023.
