= Richard Tillinghast =

American poet (born 1940)

- Born: November 25, 1940 (age 85); Memphis, Tennessee, U.S.
- Education: Sewanee: The University of the South (BA); Harvard University (MA, PhD)
- Occupations: Poet; author
- Children: 1

Richard Tillinghast (born November 25, 1940, in Memphis, Tennessee) is an American poet and author.

== Life ==
Richard Tillinghast is a native of Memphis, Tennessee, a graduate of Sewanee (BA, 1962) and Harvard (MA, 1963; PhD, 1970). He has taught at Harvard as a Briggs-Copeland Lecturer, at the University of California at Berkeley, in the college program at San Quentin Prison, at Sewanee, The Poets' House in Ireland, The University of Michigan, and the low-residency MFA program at Converse College.

Tillinghast has published twelve books of poetry and a book of translations from Turkish, as well as five non-fiction books: Damaged Grandeur (1995), a critical memoir of the poet Robert Lowell, with whom he studied as a graduate student at Harvard University in the mid-1960s; Poetry and What Is Real (2004), a selection of his critical writings about poetry; and Finding Ireland: a Poet's Explorations of Irish Literature and Culture (2008), an introduction to the country through its literature, architecture, history, and art. In 2012 he published a travel book, An Armchair Traveller's History of Istanbul, which takes a similar approach to the Turkish and Byzantine city where Tillinghast has spent considerable time for over fifty years. This book does for the city of Istanbul what Finding Ireland did for Ireland. It is an introduction to the imperial city through its history, art, architecture, religion, cuisine, etc., framed as a memoir of Tillinghast's many visits to the Turkish city beginning when he was a graduate student.

His fifth nonfiction book, Journeys into the Mind of the World, was published in 2017 by the University of Tennessee Press. Like Finding Ireland and An Armchair Traveller's History of Istanbul, Journeys is a book about place—or more specifically, places, ranging as it does among countries and cities where he has lived and traveled: his native city of Memphis and the state of Tennessee; Ireland; Venice; Iran, Afghanistan and India; London; the western United States; and Hawaii.

His most recent poetry collections are The New Life (2008), Selected Poems (2009), Sewanee Poems (2009), and Wayfaring Stranger (2012). Three other recent books of poetry are Six Mile Mountain (2000), Story Line Press, The Stonecutter's Hand (1995), David R. Godine, and Today in the Cafe Trieste (1997), new and selected poems issued by Salmon Publishing in Ireland.

In 1997 he also edited A Visit to the Gallery, a collection of poems written in response to paintings at the Museum of Art at the University of Michigan. For twenty years he reviewed new poetry for the New York Times Book Review and has also written frequently for The Irish Times. He has also reviewed and written literary essays for The Wall Street Journal, The Washington Post, and The New Criterion, as well as writing travel articles for the Times.

Using both free verse and formal constraint to shape and sharpen his examinations of historical and personal events, Tillinghast is often concerned with the elusive nature of home. Poet Floyd Skloot, reviewing The Stonecutter’s Hand (1995) for the Harvard Review, observed that in those poems, “the urgency—the impulse to go—rises from a need to strip the self down to its essence, to relocate intimacy and a sense of community by immersing himself in remoteness.” Louis Simpson wrote, "Tillinghast's poems range confidently among different cultures. He has a sense of history as a living force. The experiments in metre, rhyme and free verse in The Stonecutter's Hand are important. He is a wonderfully gifted poet, one of the few." And the late Anthony Hecht commented: "Of all the many complex, sometimes self-cancelling, tasks a poet must address, it may be that the most demanding and severe is getting things right. Richard Tillinghast performs that office with an honesty so strict that over and over his poems prove themselves faithful in ways that bring a quiet, undisputed delight." In his introduction to Tillinghast's Selected Poems, Dennis O'Driscoll wrote, "More outward-looking and international-minded than most contemporary American poets, Tillinghast nonetheless registers his country's history on his pulse. . . . In sinewy lines and solid stanzas—fruits of a lifetime's devotion to the craft—Tillinghast's most recent poems, undoubtedly his finest to date, fuse a sobering sense of mortality with the exhilaration of renewal, indeed rejuvenation, through love."

Tillinghast's poems are informed by his travels, which have been supported by grants from the Creative Arts Institute, the National Endowment for the Humanities, the Mary Roberts Rinehart Foundation, and the Michigan Council for the Arts, as well as fellowships from the American Research Institute in Turkey, the British Council, and the Irish Arts Council. He was a Woodrow Wilson Fellow at Harvard, and was also awarded a Sinclair-Kennedy Travel Grant as a graduate student. During the years 1964-66 he was editor-in-chief of Let's Go: the Student Guide to Europe.

He has also received the Amy Lowell Traveling Poetry Fellowship. The winner of the Ann Stanford Prize for Poetry, the Cleanth Brooks Award for creative non-fiction, and the James Dickey Poetry Prize, Tillinghast was nominated for the National Book Critics Circle's Nona Balakian Award for Excellence in Book Reviewing. In 2010, he was awarded a Guggenheim Fellowship.

His poems have appeared in magazines such as AGNI, The Atlantic Monthly, Gavialidae, The New Republic, The New Yorker, the Sewanee Review, Ploughshares, and Poetry, as well as online on Slate and Poetry Daily. In addition, his poems have been featured on Garrison Keillor's NPR show, The Writer's Almanac.

He has studied Turkish since the late 1980s and has been visiting Istanbul since 1964. Istanbul is the subject of some of his essays published in literary magazines such as Irish Pages, the Southern Review, Agni and Gettysburg Review. He and his daughter Julia Clare Tillinghast have collaborated on a book of translations from the poetry of Edip Cansever (1928–1986), Dirty August, published in 2009 by Talisman House. The father-daughter team was awarded a translation grant from the National Endowment for the Arts to assist with their work. Richard is currently engaged in writing a non-fiction travel book tentatively called Breakfast at the Airport, miscellaneous travel pieces about Ireland, England, and the United States.

Tillinghast retired in 2005 from the faculty of the Master of Fine Arts program at the University of Michigan, having been there since the program's inception in 1983. He has also been a Director of The Poets' House in Ireland, and founder of the Bear River Writer's Conference held annually near Petoskey, Michigan on Walloon Lake. In the early 1980s, he taught English at the University of the South in Sewanee, Tennessee. While there he wrote a five-part poem about the history of the village and University entitled "Sewanee in Ruins," which he followed up in 2008 with another long poem, Sewanee When We Were Young. He was awarded an honorary Doctor of Letters degree by the University of the South in 2008. Tillinghast has also done performance poetry: he released a poetry/music CD, My Only Friends Were the Wolves, with the Ann Arbor-based jazz fusion band Poignant Plecostomus in 1997.

Tillinghast has moved back to the US after living for five years in County Tipperary, Ireland, and now divides his time between Tennessee and the Big Island of Hawaii. He is a fly-fisherman, gardener, cook, and traveler. He also plays the guitar and sings.

== Bibliography ==
=== Poetry ===
- Sleep Watch, Wesleyan University Press, 1969 ISBN 978-0-8195-2048-7
- The Knife and Other Poems, Wesleyan University Press, 1980. ISBN 978-0-8195-1100-3
- Sewanee in Ruins, illustrated by Edward Carlos, University of the South, 1981.
- Fossils, Metal, and the Blue Limit, White Creek Press, 1982.
- Our Flag Was Still There (contains Sewanee in Ruins), Wesleyan University Press, 1984. ISBN 978-0-8195-6099-5
- A Quiet Pint in Kinvara, Salmon Publishing/Tir Eolas (Galway, Ireland), 1991.
- The Stonecutter's Hand, David R. Godine, 1995.
- Today in the Cafe Trieste, Salmon Publishing, 1997. ISBN 978-1-897648-84-1
- Six Mile Mountain, Story Line Press, 2000. ISBN 978-1-885266-90-3
- Richard Tillinghast Greatest Hits, Pudding House Publications, 2002, ISBN 978-1-58998-020-4
- The New Life, Copper Beech Press, 2008. ISBN 978-0-914278-83-2
- Selected Poems, Dedalus Press, 2009, ISBN 978-1-906614-12-6
- Sewanee Poems,The Evergreen Press, 2009, ISBN 978-0-918769-59-6
- Wayfaring Stranger, Word Palace Press, 2012, ISBN 0985026065; ISBN 978-0-9850260-6-6

=== Anthologies ===
- (Contributor) Ten American Poets, Carcanet Press, 1974.
- "Rain"; "Convergence"; "Envoi", The made thing: an anthology of contemporary Southern poetry, Editor Leon Stokesbury, University of Arkansas Press, 1999, ISBN 978-1-55728-579-9
- "Father in October"; "His Days", New poems from the third coast: contemporary Michigan poetry, Editors Michael Delp, Conrad Hilberry, Josie Kearns, Wayne State University Press, 2000, ISBN 978-0-8143-2797-5

=== Memoirs ===
- Robert Lowell's Life and Work: Damaged Grandeur, University of Michigan Press, 1995.
- An extended autobiographical essay commissioned by Gale Research can be found in Contemporary Authors, Autobiography Series, vol. 23, published in 1997.

=== Essays ===
- Poetry and What Is Real, University of Michigan Press, 2004. ISBN 978-0-472-09872-9
- Finding Ireland: a Poet's Explorations of Irish Literature and Culture, University of Notre Dame Press, 2008. ISBN 978-0-268-04232-5
- Journeys into the Mind of the World, University of Tennessee Press, 2017.

=== Travel ===
- An Armchair Traveller's History of Istanbul: City of Forgetting and Remembering, Armchair Traveller at the bookHaus, 2012. print ISBN 978-1-907973-21-5, ebook ISBN 978-1-907973-28-4
