= Joshua Brown (historian) =

American historian

Academic background
- Education: City College of New York; Columbia University

Academic work
- Discipline: History
- Institutions: CUNY Graduate Center

Joshua Brown is an American social historian, and former Executive Director, of the American Social History Project / Center for Media and Learning, at Graduate Center of the City University of New York.

He graduated from City College of New York magna cum laude with a Bachelor of Arts in 1975, from Columbia University with an M.A. in American History in 1976, and a Master of Philosophy in American History in 1978, and with a Ph.D. in 1993.

== Awards ==
- 2010 Guggenheim Fellowship

== Works ==
- History from South Africa: alternative visions and practices, Editor Joshua Brown, Temple University Press, 1991, ISBN 978-0-87722-848-6
- Who Built America? Volume 1: To 1877; Working People and the Nation's History, Authors Christopher Clark, American Social History Project, Nancy Hewitt, Joshua Brown, David Jaffee, Bedford/St. Martin's, 2007, ISBN 978-0-312-44691-8
- Forever Free: The Story of Emancipation and Reconstruction, Authors Eric Foner, Joshua Brown, Random House, Inc., 2006, ISBN 978-0-375-70274-7
- Beyond the Lines: Pictorial Reporting, Everyday Life, and the Crisis of Gilded Age America, University of California Press, 2006, ISBN 978-0-520-24814-4
