= Victor LaValle =

American writer (born 1972)

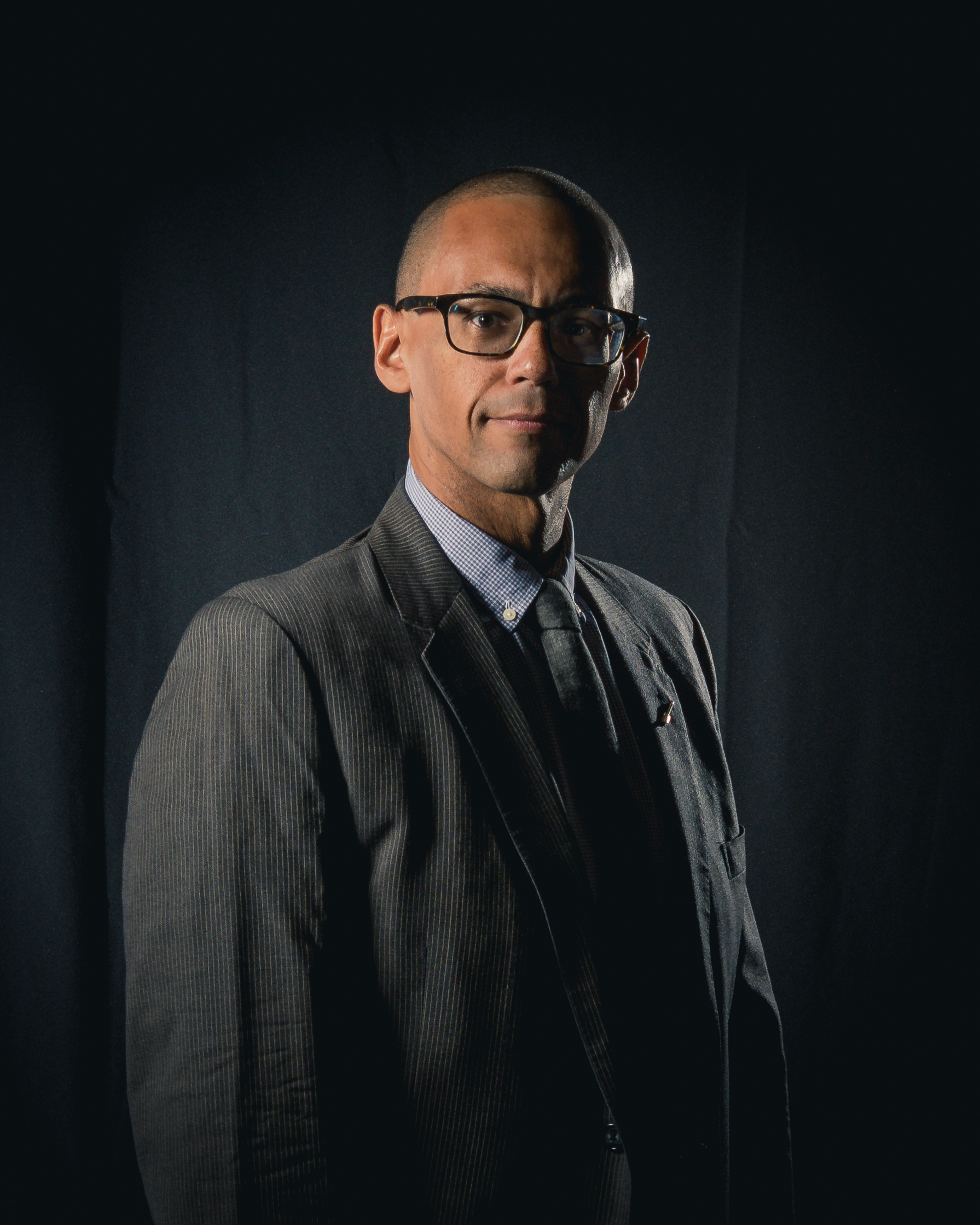
- Born: February 3, 1972 (age 54); New York City, U.S.
- Education: Cornell University (BA); Columbia University (MFA)
- Occupation: Author
- Spouse: Emily Raboteau
- Children: 2
- Writing career
- Period: 1999–present
- Genres: Speculative fiction Horror
- Notable works: Slapboxing With Jesus; The Ballad of Black Tom; The Changeling
- Notable awards: Shirley—Novel (2010); BFA—Novella (2017); Shirley—Novella (2017); WFA—Novel (2018); Locus—Horror Novel (2018)
- Website: www.victorlavalle.com

Victor LaValle (born February 3, 1972) is an American author. He is the author of a short-story collection, Slapboxing with Jesus, and five novels, The Ecstatic, Big Machine, The Devil in Silver, The Changeling, and Lone Women. His fantasy-horror novella The Ballad of Black Tom won the 2016 Shirley Jackson Award for best novella. LaValle writes primarily fiction, though he has also written essays and book reviews for GQ, Essence, The Fader, and The Washington Post. He was raised in Queens, New York, and holds degrees from Cornell University and Columbia University.

== Early life and education ==
Victor LaValle was born and raised in the Flushing and Rosedale neighborhoods of Queens, New York, by a single mother who had emigrated from Uganda in her twenties. He attended Woodmere Academy and received a degree in English from Cornell University and a Master of Fine Arts in Creative Writing from Columbia University.

== Career ==
Slapboxing with Jesus was published in 1999 by Vintage Books. The eleven interconnected stories deal mostly with the lives of young Black and Latino men living in New York in the 1970s and 1980s. The collection received wide critical praise. It won a PEN Open Book Award and LaValle received a key to Jamaica, Queens.

The Ecstatic was published in 2002 by Crown Publishing Group. The novel continues the story of Anthony James, a character from Slapboxing with Jesus. Anthony is an unhealthy college dropout who is experiencing the first signs of schizophrenia. The novel follows him and his family, who are trying their best to save Anthony, but who have their own issues. The book also received wide critical acclaim, earning comparisons to the work of Ken Kesey, Chester Himes, and John Kennedy Toole. In 2003, the novel was a finalist for both the PEN/Faulkner Award for Fiction and the Hurston/Wright Legacy Award. It is a favorite novel of rapper Mos Def, who later titled his 2009 studio album after it.

Big Machine was published in 2009 by Spiegel & Grau. The novel tells the story of Ricky Rice, a recovering drug addict and survivor of a suicide cult who receives a mysterious letter summoning him to a remote compound in Vermont. The novel was widely praised upon its release, making several national top ten lists. It also won the Shirley Jackson Award for Best Novel in 2009, as well as the Ernest J. Gaines Award for Literary Excellence and an American Book Award in 2010.

The Devil in Silver, published by Spiegel & Grau in 2012, is the story of Pepper, a mentally well man sent for observation to a psychiatric hospital. There he encounters a monster known as the Devil roaming the halls at night. He teams up with other patients to fight the staff and the monster. It was named as a best book of the year by several outlets. It has been adapted into the third season of the TV anthology series The Terror, set to premiere in 2026.

The Ballad of Black Tom, a novella, was published by Tor Books on February 16, 2016. It is a retelling of the H. P. Lovecraft story "The Horror at Red Hook" from the point of view of a young Black man living in Harlem.

The Changeling was published in 2017 by Spiegel & Grau and received critical acclaim. It was selected as one of 2017's ten best books by New York Public Library and won the 2018 World Fantasy Award for Best Novel, the 2018 Locus Award for Horror Novel, and the 2018 British Fantasy Award for Horror Novel. It was adapted into a TV series of the same name on Apple TV in 2023.

Destroyer, a graphic novel published in 2017 by Boom! Studios, is a modern retelling of Frankenstein (1818). The story follows an African-American descendant of Dr. Frankenstein, her only son who was killed in a police encounter, and the monster from the original novel.

Lone Women, a novel published in 2023 by One World, is a fantasy horror western set in 1915. The story follows protagonist Adelaide Henry, a single woman who leaves her family farm in California to establish a homestead in Montana. Lone Woman was a finalist for the 2023 Los Angeles Times Book Prize in Science Fiction, Fantasy, and Speculative Fiction.

LaValle is an associate professor at the Columbia University School of the Arts.

== Personal life ==
He lives in New York with his wife, novelist Emily Raboteau, and their son and daughter.

== Awards and nominations ==
=== Literature awards ===
Year	Nominee	Award	Category	Result	Ref
2002	Slapboxing with Jesus	PEN/Open Book Award	—	Won (co-winner)	
2003	The Ecstatic	PEN/Faulkner Award	—	Shortlisted	
2003	The Ecstatic	Hurston/Wright Legacy Award	Fiction	Shortlisted	
2009	Big Machine	Shirley Jackson Award	Novel	Won	
2010	Big Machine	American Book Awards	—	Won (co-winner)	
2010	Big Machine	Ernest J. Gaines Award	—	Won	
2013	The Devil in Silver	Shirley Jackson Award	Novel	Shortlisted	
2016	The Ballad of Black Tom	Bram Stoker Award	Long Fiction	Shortlisted	
2016	The Ballad of Black Tom	Shirley Jackson Award	Novella	Won	
2016	The Ballad of Black Tom	Nebula Award	Novella	Shortlisted	
2017	The Ballad of Black Tom	British Fantasy Award	Novella	Won	
2017	The Ballad of Black Tom	Hugo Award	Novella	Shortlisted	
2017	The Ballad of Black Tom	Locus Award	Novella	Nominated—3rd	
2017	The Ballad of Black Tom	Theodore Sturgeon Award	—	Shortlisted	
2017	The Ballad of Black Tom	World Fantasy Award	Novella	Shortlisted	
2017	The Changeling	Dragon Awards	Horror Novel	Won	
2017	The Changeling	Shirley Jackson Award	Novel	Shortlisted	
2018	The Changeling	British Fantasy Award	Horror Novel	Won	
2018	The Changeling	Locus Award	Horror Novel	Won	
2018	The Changeling	Mythopoeic Awards	Adult Novel	Shortlisted	
2018	The Changeling	World Fantasy Award	Novel	Won (tie)	
2019	Victor LaValle's Destroyer	Bram Stoker Award	Graphic Novel	Won	
2020	A People's Future of the United States	Ignyte Awards	Anthology/Collection	Shortlisted	
2020	A People's Future of the United States	Locus Award	Anthology	Nominated—3rd	
2020	"Up from Slavery"	Bram Stoker Award	Short Fiction	Won	
2023	Lone Woman	Los Angeles Times Book Prize	Science Fiction, Fantasy, and Speculative Fiction	Finalist	

=== Honors ===
- 1998: Fine Arts Work Center Fiction Fellow
- 2000: Breadloaf Writer's Fellowship
- 2004: Whiting Award for Fiction
- 2006: United States Artists Ford Fellowship
- 2010: Guggenheim Fellowship
- 2011: Dutch Foundation for Literature Writers' Residency

== Works ==
=== Books ===
- —— (1999). Slapboxing with Jesus: Stories. Vintage. ISBN 978-0375705908.
- —— (2002). The Ecstatic. Crown. ISBN 978-0609610145.
- —— (2009). Big Machine. Spiegel & Grau. ISBN 978-0385527989.
- —— (2012). The Devil in Silver. Spiegel & Grau. ISBN 978-1400069866.
- —— (2012). Lucretia and the Kroons. Spiegel & Grau. ISBN 978-0812984378.
- —— (2016). The Ballad of Black Tom. Tor. ISBN 978-0765387868.
- —— (2017). The Changeling. Spiegel & Grau. ISBN 978-0812995947.
- —— (2023). Lone Women. One World. ISBN 978-0525512080.

=== As editor ===
- ——; Adams, John Joseph, eds. (2019). A People's Future of the United States: Speculative Fiction from 25 Extraordinary Writers. Random House Group. ISBN 978-0525508816.

=== Essays ===
- "Long Distance". Granta (110). Spring 2010.

=== Comics ===
- Destroyer. BOOM! Studios. 2018. ISBN 978-1684150557.
- Eve. BOOM! Studios. 2021. ISBN 978-1684158089.
- Sabretooth: The Adversary. Marvel Comics. 2022. ISBN 978-1302931452.
- Sabretooth & the Exiles. Marvel Comics. 2024. ISBN 978-1302948368.
