= Helen O'Leary =

Irish and American artist

- Born: 1961 (age 64–65); County Wexford, Ireland
- Education: School of the Art Institute of Chicago, National College of Art and Design
- Known for: Painting, sculpture
- Style: Abstract, assemblage
- Awards: John Simon Guggenheim Memorial Foundation, Pollock-Krasner Foundation, American Academy in Rome Fellowship, Joan Mitchell Foundation
- Website: Helen O'Leary

Helen O'Leary (born 1961) is an Irish-born artist based in the United States and Ireland, known for constructions that blur the boundaries between painting and sculpture and object and image. She uses bricolage and handicraft approaches to refashion older works, studio castoffs and diverse materials into abstract pieces that explore materials, language, remnants of the past, and the visual, cultural and emotional influences of origin. She has exhibited internationally, including shows at the Irish Museum of Modern Art (IMMA), Metropolitan Arts Centre (MAC) (Belfast), American Academy of Arts and Letters, SFMOMA, the Sanskriti Foundation (New Delhi), Victorian College of the Arts (Melbourne), and Centre Culturel Irlandais (Paris). Her work has been recognized by the American Academy in Rome and John S. Guggenheim, Pollock-Krasner and Joan Mitchell foundations, numerous residencies, and reviews in The Times (UK), The New York Times, Chicago Tribune, The Irish Times, and Arts Magazine, among others.

Helen O'Leary, Delicate Negotiations, clay, egg tempera on constructed wood, 56" x 48", 2015.

Irish Times art critic Aidan Dunne writes of her constructions: "O'Leary dismantles painting and then rebuilds it from scratch [...] The works have a fragility, an exploratory delicacy, but also appear curiously durable and timeless." David Roth calls her work a form of self-appropriation rooted in the "DIY ethos" of her forebears, which demonstrates "how cultural traditions, removed from their original contexts, can be used as emotional anchors in others." O'Leary lives and works in Jersey City, New Jersey and County Leitrim, Ireland, and is a professor at the School of Visual Arts at Penn State University, where she has taught since 1991.

== Life and career ==
O'Leary was born in County Wexford in southeastern Ireland in 1961. She grew up with her sisters on a small farm owned by her parents, Richard and Kathleen, that she has called "pre-modern." A tornado, a lightning strike, and her father's early death when O'Leary was eleven left the family at risk of losing the farm; the ensuing struggle, which her mother met by renting rooms to tourists as a B&B, marks O'Leary's practice and forms the basis of its feminist language. She also cites her father's practical inventiveness, the demands of farm life, and meeting far-flung visitors in the guest house as key influences.

O'Leary enrolled at National College of Art and Design in Dublin in 1982, and was awarded a scholarship to the School of the Art Institute of Chicago in the United States, where she earned a BFA (1987) and MFA (1989). In 1989, she won a Pollock-Krasner Award and was actively exhibiting in Chicago, including solo shows at Zolla/Lieberman Gallery (1991–3). In 1991, she accepted a teaching position at the School of Visual Arts at Penn State University; she was made Professor in 2006, and continues to teach there.

In the latter 1990s, O'Leary exhibited regularly in Ireland and across the U.S., including solos at the Kerlin Gallery (Dublin) and Michael Gold Gallery (New York) and the EVA International exhibition in Limerick; in the 2000s, she showed at the Linnenhall Arts Centre (2002), Limerick City Gallery of Art (2003) and MAC (2016) in Ireland, the Sanskriti Foundation (2004), Victorian College of the Arts (2005), and Centre Culturel Irlandais (2010). She has shown with Lesley Heller Gallery and M. David & Co. in New York and Patricia Sweetow Gallery in San Francisco in her latter career. In 2013, O'Leary collaborated with her daughter, photographer Eva O'Leary, and poet Vona Groarke for an exhibition at the Irish Art Center in New York. Since 2021, she has been involved with the Penn State School of Visual Arts's Studio for Sustainability and Social Action (S3A) program, which reimagines the visual arts practice with sustainability and social action at its core.

== Work ==
Helen O'Leary, Untitled, oil on linen, 72" x 72", 1989.

Writers such as Alison Pilkington and Robin Hill suggest that O'Leary's work deconstructs painting, expanding its possibilities into space while blurring boundaries between object and image with bricolage approaches they trace to Kurt Schwitters and Dada, as well as Arte Povera. O'Leary's exploration extends to the history of painting and its materials, as well as her personal and artistic history; she transforms studio remnants and detritus into new, tactile works through an intuitive, part-handicraft, part invention-through-need process that harkens to her Irish childhood, weaving personal memories into universal narratives. O'Leary calls it as "knitting with wood," and describes her studio as "an archeological site, a dictionary of the savages of age, a compendium of erasures, renovations and restorations" that she regards as a complete whole, from its objects and scraps to incidental marks on the floors and tables.

=== Early paintings ===
In her early work in Chicago, O'Leary created large-scale paintings that riffed on the "heroic" work of abstract expressionism (e.g., Untitled, 1989). She laid canvas on the floor, capturing drips, mistakes and overshot gestures normally bound for floorboards; for her, the process alluded to issues of class (e.g., servants washing floors) and subsistence (surviving off table leavings and cast offs). Chicago Tribune critic Alan Artner labeled her second solo show at Zolla/Lieberman (1991) a fulfillment of earlier promise, noting her "drawn, dripped and stenciled" works for an improvised look that "disguised their rigor" and that recalled the early abstractions of Kandinsky. Artner suggested that in the best works, her lattice-like forms "exploit fragility by suggesting a highly strung discourse that has run amok" with accretions submerging, encircling, overwhelming firmer shapes and gestures.

After purchasing a home in Drumshanbo, Ireland in the 1994, O'Leary traveled more often. As a result, she sought to create still-epic paintings that could fit in suitcases and be reassembled; this extended her fragmented painting process further and led to new modes of creating, picking apart and exhibiting work. Aidan Dunne described a painting installation in this vein for EVA International in Limerick (1999) as a "sprawling but elegantly understated" recreation of the "crowded yet calming walls" of her studio. In the 2000s, she extended these explorations in collaborative installations with artist Katie Holten as "Plot"; her experimentation ultimately evolved into her mature "constructed paintings."

Helen O'Leary, Armour – Delicate Negotiations, egg tempera, polymer, pigment on constructed wood, 20" x 14" x 4", 2014.

=== Constructed paintings ===
In the 2000s, O'Leary began creating constructed paintings focused on themes of vulnerability, uncertainty, concealment and perseverance with a feminist inflection (e.g., Delicate Negotiations, 2015). She disassembled, repurposed, glued and patched older works and studio detritus, refashioning them into new pieces exploring notions of support, stability and the boundaries of painting. These works took on a variety of tenuous, three-dimensional forms: small, wall-mounted, façade-like pieces masking precarious scaffolds; free-standing, exposed grid-like constructions reading like absences with open spaces replacing blocks of color (e.g., Armour – Delicate Negotiations, 2014); and installations displaying a "kinetic, Tinguely-like potential." O'Leary found inspiration in diverse sources, from bent and pierced armor to the combined concision and complexity of both sean-nós song—a form of Irish lament—and the literature of Beckett and poets Louise Gluck and Vona Groarke.

In the installations The Shape of Disappointment (2007), Outawack (2009–12) and Shelf life of facts (2016), she reconfigured frames into excessive, prosthesis-like supports that conveyed uncertainty, shifting perspectives, and a sense of controlled violence in their making. The wall-mounted "Armour" series (2013–4) featured small, façades of abutted bits of panel that obscure, but also reveal (through peephole-like fissures), views of cobbled, sometimes thwarted armatures. Reviewers described them as delicate, tentative pieces reflecting mystery, assured resourcefulness, meticulousness and quiet strength, austerely painted in grey, purple brown, olive and white egg tempera. The Huffington Post deemed the larger, busier works in her "The Geometry of Dirt" show (2014) as "harrowingly emotional" and "at once ragged, solid and radiant," their processes of destruction and construction suggesting the piecing together of an incomplete self, with holes and punctures reading like wounds; the work's minimalist sensibility privileged the experiential and earth-bound over that movement's intellectual, de-materialized and transcendent tendencies.

Helen O'Leary, Shelf life of facts (Installation details), constructed wood, linen, egg tempera, steel, aluminum, porcelain with gold luster. Installation at The MAC Belfast, 2016.

Robin Hill described O'Leary's "Safe House" (2014–8) and "Home is a Foreign Country" (2018) series as "formally rigorous yet refreshingly eccentric" works that conjured precarious balance and collapse, upended jigsaw puzzles, the backs of billboards, and drive-in movie screens. Identifying the work's foregrounding of structure, she situated it in a liminal space between becoming and unbecoming, assemblage and dis-assemblage. Others describe the work in familial terms, noting its "life-lived authenticity, hands-on craftsmanship," and ongoing dialogue with each new piece and its predecessors.

The work in O'Leary's exhibition, "Writing the Unwritable Novel" (Patricia Sweetow, 2021), integrated her experiences of Rome and its regard for artifacts, with eccentric, open "cartons" that cradled her characteristic, intricately constructed forms. Artforum critic Maria Porges described them as "small yet powerful objects" whose illusion of fragility and "itinerant impermanence" belied their layered strength and stability. The two-person exhibition, "Shelter" (M. David & Co., 2022, with Liliana Zavaleta), explored various themes around the title concept related to belonging, memory, identity, and community.

== Awards and recognition ==
O'Leary's art has been honored with the Rome Prize (American Academy in Rome, (2018–9), fellowships from the Civitella Ranieri Foundation (2021), Guggenheim Foundation (2010), Sam and Adele Golden Foundation (2017), MacDowell Colony (2016) and Centre Culturel Irlandaise (2010), and awards from Culture Ireland (2015) and the Joan Mitchell (1999) and Pollock-Krasner (1989, 1996) foundations. In 2013, Penn State University awarded her a Faculty Scholar Medal for Outstanding Achievement in the arts and humanities. She has also received grants from the Arts Council of Ireland, and residencies from Yaddo, the Joan Mitchell Center, the Tyrone Guthrie Centre (Ireland), Fundacion Valparaiso (Spain), and the Skowhegan School of Painting and Sculpture. She has been a visiting artist at National College of Art and Design, GMT Galway and the University of Limerick (all Ireland), and the Victoria College of the Arts (Australia), in addition to universities in the United States.

O'Leary received a Hennessy Purchase Prize for the Irish Museum of Modern Art (IMMA) in 2018 and a purchase award from the American Academy of Arts and Letters in 2017; her work has been acquired by a number of public collections, including those of the Ballinglen Foundation, National Gallery of Ireland, the Girls' Club, and University of Maine, among others. It was also included in the Gallery of Modern Art (GoMA) Glasgow exhibit and book, An Leabhar Mór (The Great Book of Gaelic) (2002–3).
