= Terence Gower =

Canadian artist based in New York City (born 1965)

Terence Gower (born 1965) is a Canadian artist based in New York City. He has exhibited his work and curated exhibitions at galleries and museums in the United States, Mexico, Canada, Germany, France, Spain, Italy, Brazil, Argentina and Cuba. He has published seven editions and multiples (most recently, Kitchen I & II) and has created public projects for Cologne, Mexico City, and New York City. In 2010 he was awarded a Guggenheim Fellowship for his art work.

His work is in the permanent collections of the Hirshhorn Museum and Sculpture Garden in Washington, D.C.; the Peter Norton Collection in New York and Los Angeles; the Queens Museum and Carlos Brillembourg (both in New York); Patrick Kullenberg in New York and Stockholm; and the Colección Júmex, Peñafiel, and Haydee Rovirosa collections (all in Mexico City); and the Mauro Herlitzka Collection in Buenos Aires.

== Projects ==
- 5 Notable Pavilions, Digital video and lightbox (2003–05)
- Axonometric Study, Mexico City (2005)
- Ciudad Moderna, Digital video (2004)
- Colour/Plane Study, New York (2003)
- El Muro Rojo, Mexico City (2005–06)
- Functionalism, Photo Mural (2003–05)
- The Bicycle Pavilion, Colección Júmex, Mexico City (2002)
- The Red Wall, New York and Oslo (2004–06)
- The Polytechnic, Digital video (2005)

== Publications ==
Ciudad Moderna (ISBN 9788475067278), published by Turner in 2007, is a collection of photography, graphics and video stills from a short film, and a homage to Mexican modernist architecture, and to the aesthetics of mid-century Latin America. It includes essays by Craig Buckley, Priamo Lozada and Itala Schmelz.

Appendices, Illustrations & Notes (ISBN 9781889195353), published by Smart Art Press in 1999, is a collaboration between Gower and writer Mónica de la Torre.

Display Architecture (ISBN 9788890340109), published by Navado Press Trieste in 2007, is a survey of Gower's work on modernist strategies of display and representation in architecture. The book focuses on one of the artist's principal subjects, exhibition pavilions and display architecture. It also includes essays by Juan Carlos Cano, Michel Blancsubé and Moises Puente.

== Awards and recognition ==
In addition to his Guggenheim Fellowship, his honors include fellowships from the Smithsonian Artists Research program, the Graham Foundation for Advanced Studies in the Fine Arts, the Cité de Arts in Paris, the Bogliasco Foundation in Genoa, and the Residencia Internacional de Artistas en Argentina in Buenos Aires. He has also received grants from the Peter S. Reed Foundation and the Peter Norton Family Foundation and an Architecture, Planning & Design Project Award from the New York State Council on the Arts.
