= Patrick J. Lynett =

American coastal engineer

Patrick J. Lynett is an American coastal engineer and Shea Chair Professor in the Sonny Astani Department of Civil and Environmental Engineering at the University of Southern California. He works in the area of coastal impacts due to extreme natural events.

He graduated from Cornell University with a B.S. (1997), M.E. (1998), and Ph.D (2002). He taught at Texas A&M University from 2002-2010, and spent a fellowship year at Princeton University in 2011. He is the Secretary of the Coastal Engineering Research Council and is the Editor of the Coastal Engineering Proceedings. He was awarded a Guggenheim Fellowship in 2010.

== Awards ==
- 2013 American Society of Civil Engineers Walter L. Huber Civil Engineering Research Prize
- 2010 Guggenheim Fellowship
- 2008 Commander's Award for Public Service given by the United States Department of the Army

== Works ==
- "Observations by the International Tsunami Survey Team in Sri Lanka", Science, June 2005
- "Coastal Engineering Proceedings - 2014", ISBN 978-0-9896611-2-6
