= Emily Raboteau =

American novelist

- Born: 1976 (age 49–50)
- Education: Yale University; New York University (MFA)
- Spouse: Victor LaValle
- Writing career
- Language: English
- Years active: 2005–present
- Notable works: The Professor's Daughter, Searching for Zion

Emily Raboteau (born 1976) is an American fiction writer and essayist. She is professor of creative writing at the City College of New York.

== Early life and education ==
Emily Raboteau was born in 1976, the daughter of Princeton University professor Albert J. Raboteau. She grew up in New Jersey.

She received an undergraduate degree at Yale University and an MFA from New York University. She teaches at City College of New York.

== Career ==
Raboteau's writing has been published in The Guardian, The New York Times, New York Review of Books, Oxford American, The Believer, Guernica, The Best American Short Stories, The Best American Nonrequired Reading, The Best American Mystery and Suspense, and The Best African American Essays.

Her first novel The Professor's Daughter was published in 2005. Her second book, Searching for Zion: The Quest for Home in the African Diaspora, a work of creative nonfiction, was published in 2013 and won a 2014 American Book Award.

She is professor of creative writing at the City College of New York.

== Recognition and awards ==
Raboteau has received the Pushcart Prize, the Chicago Tribune's Nelson Algren Award, a New York Foundation for the Arts Fellowship, and a Literature Fellowship from the National Endowment for the Arts.

== Personal life ==
Raboteau married novelist Victor LaValle. They have two children.

== Works ==
- "The Professor's Daughter". Macmillan Publishers. July 20, 2021.
- Searching for Zion,
- "Lessons for Survival". Macmillan Publishers. July 20, 2021..
