= Straight (magazine) =

Swedish gay magazine

- Editor: Karl Andersson, Jon Voss
- Categories: Gay
- Frequency: Quarterly
- First issue: 1999
- Final issue: 2002
- Country: Sweden
- Language: Swedish
- ISSN: 1404-2797

Straight was the first glossy gay men magazine in Sweden, launched in October 1999. It was focused on fashion and gay culture.

Straight was published by QX förlag with an initial print run of 30,000 copies. Karl Andersson was the initial editor in chief and Ted Hesselbom the fashion editor. Andersson started the magazine in October 1999, inspired by magazines like Attitude and XY. It was launched as an ad-financed free newspaper to be distributed quarterly in Malmö, Stockholm, Gothenburg and Copenhagen. Later Jon Voss took over as editor. In 2001, Voss defined the magazine as targeting men with an interest in fashion, who lived in cities. At the time, it had a circulation of 25,000 copies.

Straight also attempted to launch German and French editions.
