= Design the Skyline =

Texas-based metalcore band

- Also known as: Extra Large Kids (2007–2010)
- Origin: Corpus Christi, Texas, United States
- Genres: Deathcore; metalcore; avant-garde metal; electronicore; mathcore (early)
- Years active: 2007–2013, 2014–2019, 2025-present
- Labels: Victory, Go With Me
- Spinoffs: Sleepless in December; Dreams to Eternity
- Members: Daniel Garza; Matt Ryan; Dean Ramirez
- Past members: Eric Azure; Brandon Beaulieu; Jordan Corby; Henry Maneuver; Matti Hoffman; Shota Nishimura; Max Warren; See band members section for others

Design the Skyline is a metalcore band from Corpus Christi, Texas. Formed in 2007, the band originally was known as Extra Large Kids during high school and recorded demo songs while playing in their local area under this name. In 2011, the band gained international attention after being signed to Victory Records with their song "Surrounded by Silence" and its accompanying video, which was so negatively received to the point where the band gained a considerable exposure. The negative reaction was generally due to the song's key structure and sound changes, as well the band's overt "scene" image at the time.

The band's later-released debut full-length album, Nevaeh, subsequently featured a completely different sound to that of "Surrounded by Silence". Nevaeh was met with generally mixed reviews, though fans of the genre itself were highly critical of the album. Since 2011, the band has gone through an abundance of lineup changes, even leading a short breakup in 2013, but managed to reform the proceeding year. The reformed band would release three singles intended for the band's second album, Rebirth, but Design the Skyline would break-up again in 2019. The band went through several line-up changes leaving vocalist Eric Azure as the only remaining original member.

The band returned in October 2025 with the release of their new single Beckoning. Their return includes three original members of the band Daniel Garza, Matt Ryan and Dean Ramirez.

== History ==
=== Early beginnings, "Surrounded by Silence", and signing to Victory Records (2007–11) ===
All members being high school friends, Design the Skyline was founded during 2007, then known as Extra Large Kids, and played and practiced throughout their time in school. While gaining some significant attention through Myspace, the band released a demo album titled Galactical Celebration during the same year of their formation. By the next year, the band released a song titled "Terror at the Tea Party" and it went along with their set list while playing in their local areas. Drummer John Martian explained that there was "no real meaning" behind the name Extra Large Kids other than just it being "[us] kids living extra large".

In 2010, the band changed their name to Design the Skyline. Then-vocalist Daniel Garza explained the name change: "It means make your own limits. Don't be afraid to be who you are and don't let anyone try to change who you are." Keyboardist James "Keebler" Lemos joined around the time of their name change, followed by bassist Ethan White joining in 2011, replacing the group's former bassist, Christopher Chapa, who left in April 2010.

During March 2011, the band recorded the video for their single 'Surrounded by Silence' with local production team Red Island Productions. The setting of the video consisted of the band playing on a set that rendered a forest. Other scenes in the video include the band playing in a cave with prop snow falling down on the members, which was designed from potato flakes and small pieces of cotton. The video's production was completed by March and the band uploaded it onto YouTube that month.

After its release, New York-based band The Bunny the Bear took notice of it online and showcased it to Victory, which led to the signing of Design the Skyline. When the news broke out that Design the Skyline were signed to Victory, criticism for the band was then met at extremely high levels from several locations around the world, with even a lot of the criticism even directed at Victory for signing the band.

=== Nevaeh (2011–12) ===
By the end of July, the Surrounded by Silence music video garnered more than half of a million views and the group released a song from their upcoming album as a single, titled "Break Free from Your Life". The song was met with a much better response than "Surrounded by Silence", although some critics still panned the band for miscellaneous reasons.

When asked if all the negative reception the band encountered with the song and music video for "Surrounded by Silence" hindered or bothered the members, their response was; "At first it did not anymore, people don't seem to realize that the Surrounded By Silence song was just a demo song and not every band sounds their best on their first demo, you know, and it's crazy how much it blew us up!" A music video, at this point, was confirmed to be in the works for "Break Free from Your Life" and the band's debut full-length album Nevaeh was released on August 16, 2011. Before its release, discussion and reports of the album held claims for it to feature a completely different sound than what the greatly negative-received "Surrounded by Silence" song displayed.

On August 15 (one day before the release of Nevaeh), bassist Ethan White was fired from the band. The members have stated the reason for it was due to him missing many practice dates and not being well-associated enough. The music video for "Break Free from Your Life" was released on August 30; White is included in it.

During the following months, the band prepared for their first-ever tour, which began in December with Design the Skyline headlining over Northridge-based band, Lions!Tigers!Bears! and Bend-based band, Capture the Flag. The band's follow-up tour began in 2012, supporting Dr. Acula.

=== Lineup changes, "Deathgaze", and breakup (2012–13) ===
On April 24, 2012, the band confirmed that Martian was no longer a part of the band. The reasons for his departure were not disclosed, but it was maintained that Martian and the band were not on negative terms with each other. Martian's replacement would later be John Anthony Perez, dubbed by the members as "John 2.0".

In September 2012, Matt Ryan Garza (no relation to vocalist, Daniel Garza) and Dean Ramirez had left the band, and on February 23, 2013 unveiled their own project with Ethan White, Sleepless in December, with Ryan on vocals, Ramirez on lead guitar and White on rhythm guitar and backing vocals.

On April 5, 2013, it was confirmed that John Martian & Ethan White had returned to the band, while James Lemos had left. The first single from their second album, "Deathgaze" was released on May 14. However, the band would officially break up that summer on July 26, 2013.

=== Reformation, Rebirth, and lineup instability (2014–2019) ===
In October 2014, the band announced that they had reformed and would soon be putting out new material. Along with vocalist Eric Azure and guitarist Matt Ryan, who were the sole original members remaining at the time, this incarnation of the band also initially consisted of bassist Robby Anderson (of Despised Virtue) and drummer Christian Smith (formerly of Proletariat).

On December 2, the band released a teaser video of a new track and announced that they would be releasing a new album in 2015. On December 23, the band released a teaser for the title track of their upcoming album Rebirth, and also revealed the album's artwork. The band would also announce that former vocalist Daniel Garza would be rejoining the band as a guitarist. On January 23, 2015, the band released a pre-production version of a song called "Stargaze", which will appear on Rebirth. The band would simultaneously announce that their 2013 single "Deathgaze" would also be appearing on Rebirth.

Towards the end of February, the band had parted ways with guitarist Daniel Garza. Shortly after, drummer Christian Smith left the band to focus on graphic design. Shortly after Smith's departure, he founded his own company Broken Robot Productions, which specializes in creating lyric videos. Then-bassist Robby Anderson went on to explain that despite their abrupt departures, the band was still on good terms with both Garza and Smith, who would be replaced by guitarist Matti Hoffman and drummer Kyle Greene (formerly of The Paramedic and The Bunny the Bear) respectively. Following these announcements, as well as the official release of their single "Rebirth", guitarist Matt Ryan, bassist Robby Anderson, and drummer Kyle Greene would all go on to depart from the group. The band's next single "Lotus" was released on January 11, 2016.

In late 2019, an Instagram post was made seemingly suggesting that Rebirth would finally see a release.

In 2021, the band's demo, Galactical Celebration, was released on vinyl through Wax Vessel Records. The release included "Surrounded by Silence" as a bonus track.

=== Return with original members, Beckoning, and Dreams to Eternity (2025-present) ===
On October 16, 2025, three original members, Daniel Garza, Matt Ryan and Dean Ramirez, created new pages across various social media with the name, along with releasing their newest single Beckoning. This kickstarted a short-lived time where both Eric's band and Dani's band were claiming to be the "real" Design the Skyline. During this time, Eric released Design the Skyline's previously unreleased catalog, including the Extra Large Kids album and the demos before their Nevaeh release. Dani made public posts saying that these were released without his consent and without any kind of royalty agreements.

On November 1, 2025, Eric Azure, Matti Hoffman and Shota Nishimura, alongside returning members Julian Reckless, James Lemos and John Anthony, announced they would continue under the name Dreams to Eternity, and released a single called Bloodlust. When this happened, both Dreams to Eternity and Design the Skyline made and shared public posts saying that they have reached mutual agreements and are officially on good terms again, supporting the others in all of their endeavors. On Facebook, they both share the sentiment of "No more negativity, just music and respect all around. Please support both projects as we move forward and check out the new songs."

== Band members ==
Current Line-up

- Daniel Garza – lead vocals (2007–2013, 2025-present), guitars (2014–2015), bass (2007)
- Matt Ryan Garza – lead guitar, programming (2007–2012, 2014–2015, 2025-present)
- Dean Ramirez – guitars (2025-present), bass (2011–2012)

Former

- Julian "Julian Reckless" Ibanez – rhythm guitar (2007–2013), programming (2013)
- John "Martian" Perkins – drums (2007–2012, 2013)
- Christopher Chapa – bass (2008–2010)
- Ethan White – bass (2010–2011), guitar (2013), clean vocals (2010–2011, 2013)
- James "Keebler" Lemos – keyboards, programming (2010–2013), bass guitar (2012–2013)
- John Anthony "John 2.0" Perez – drums (2012–2013)
- Robby Antilla – bass (2014–2015)
- Christian Smith – drums (2014–2015)
- Kyle Greene – drums (2015)
- Eric Azure – lead vocals (2007–2013, 2014–2019)
- Brandon Beaulieu – bass (2015–2019)
- Jordan Corby – keyboards (2015–2019)
- Henry Maneuver – lead guitar (2015–2019)
- Matti Hoffman – rhythm guitar (2015–2019)
- Shota Nishimura – rhythm guitar (2016–2019)
- Max Warren – drums (2016–2019)

Timeline

== Discography ==
=== Albums ===
- Nevaeh (2011, Victory Records)

Demos

- Galactical Celebration (2007, self-released)

=== Singles ===
- "Surrounded by Silence" (2011, self-released)
- "Break Free from Your Life" (2011, Victory Records)
- "Deathgaze" (2013, Victory Records)
- "Rebirth" (2015, self-released)
- "Lotus" (2016, self-released)
- "In Dreams" (2018, self-released)
- "Beckoning" (2025, self-released)
- "Autumn's End" (2026, self-released)

== See also ==
- Music of Texas
