= Seung-Won Oh =

South Korean composer (born 1969)

- Born: 1969 (age 56–57); Seoul, South Korea
- Education: Ewha Womans University; Royal Conservatory of The Hague; University of Illinois Urbana-Champaign; Brandeis University
- Occupation: Composer
- Employer: DePaul University
- Awards: Guggenheim Fellowship (2010)

Academic background
- Thesis: Olivier Messiaen's composition techniques in Réveil des oiseaux (2005)
- Doctoral advisor: Eric Chafe
- Musical career
- Genres: Contemporary classical music

Seung-Won Oh (Korean: 오승원; born 1969), also known as Seung-Ah Oh, is a South Korean composer. She is a 2010 Guggenheim Fellow.

== Biography ==
Oh was born in 1969 in Seoul. She obtained her BA and MM from Ewha Womans University, as well as another MM from the Royal Conservatory of The Hague. In addition to doctoral studies at the University of Illinois Urbana-Champaign, she obtained her MA and PhD from Brandeis University; her doctoral dissertation Olivier Messiaen's composition techniques in Réveil des oiseaux was supervised by Eric Chafe.

The Plain Dealer said that her 2001 piece So-Ri I, during its premiere at the Aki Festival of New Music in Cleveland, "brought an Asian sensibility to meditative music made from the natural harmonics of the guitar ... in dialogue with the flute. She was awarded two MacDowell Colony Fellowships, each in 2003 and 2009, as well as a 2007 Goddard Lieberson Fellowship in Music. She won the first-place and audience prizes at the 2005 Seoul International Competition for Composers, as well as the 2010 Toonzetters award for best contemporary music.

She collaborated with artist Ji-Young Chae and opera singer Margriet van Reisen to create an installation art exhibition dedicated to Hwang Jini. Regarding Lege Wieg/Boş Beşik, her 2010 co-production with Cilia Hogerzeil, Pieter Verstraete said that with Oh’s use of a small musical ensemble and even with her use of some Turkish makam elements, “the end result is stripped of any particular Turkish musical characteristics” In 2010, she was awarded a Guggenheim Fellowship.

Her work was performed by the Uzbekistan-based Omnibus Ensemble in 2011. Her 2008 piece "Canonic Phase" was performed at the 2014 Tanglewood Music Festival; The Boston Globe said that it was “was more systematically exhaustive, rhythms and timbres combined and layered into larger, ritualistic patterns”. She was part of the 2016 Gaudeamus Festival award jury. Her piece Elegy in Me premiered at the 2024 String Quartet Biennial in Paris.

She has also worked as assistant professor of composition at the DePaul University School of Music in Chicago.
