= Destroyer (magazine) =

2006–2010 Swedish pederastic magazine

- Editor: Karl Andersson
- Categories: Gay
- Frequency: Twice a year
- First issue: 2006
- Final issue: 2010
- Country: Sweden
- Language: English
- Website: destroyerjournal.com
- ISSN: 1801-8203

Destroyer – Journal of Apollonian Beauty and Dionysian Sexuality was a Swedish-based pederastic magazine published by Karl Andersson, with the objective "to bring back the adolescent boy as one of the ideals of gay culture". The magazine contained features, essays, interviews, reviews, columns, culture articles, fiction and sexually suggestive images of boys as young as 13.

== Controversy ==
In a live radio debate, the chairman of the Swedish Federation for Lesbian, Gay, Bisexual and Transgender Rights accused Destroyer editor Karl Andersson of "giving gay people a bad name", an accusation they stood by when questioned by international LGBT media. Many of the images were taken in developing countries, and it was unclear in some cases whether the depicted boys were aware that they were being photographed.

Destroyer's final issue (#10), published in January 2010, was limited to 1,000 copies.

== Book ==
Karl Andersson's Swedish book Bögarnas värsta vän - historien om tidningen Destroyer was published in October 2010 and covers the reactions to the magazine. The book made headline in several national newspapers. Aftonbladet published a favorable review, which was criticized by the culture editor of Expressen. Key players in the initial scandals were interviewed by Svenska Dagbladet, including Andersson himself and the former chairman of the Swedish Federation for Lesbian, Gay, Bisexual and Transgender Rights.

The English translation Gay Man's Worst Friend - the Story of Destroyer Magazine was published in March 2011.

== Academic interest ==
The reactions to Destroyer have repeatedly been used in academic discourse as an example of what kind of expressions gay culture or sex radicalism may or may not include, and how that can change over time. One doctoral dissertation describes Destroyer's relevance thus: "The tension along the culturally determined barrier between ‘good’ and ‘bad’ sexual expressions is demonstrated in the scandal of Destroyer magazine and the outrage it sparked within gay rights debates."

== See also ==
- List of LGBT publications
