= Johannes Ledolter =

American academic (1950–2023)

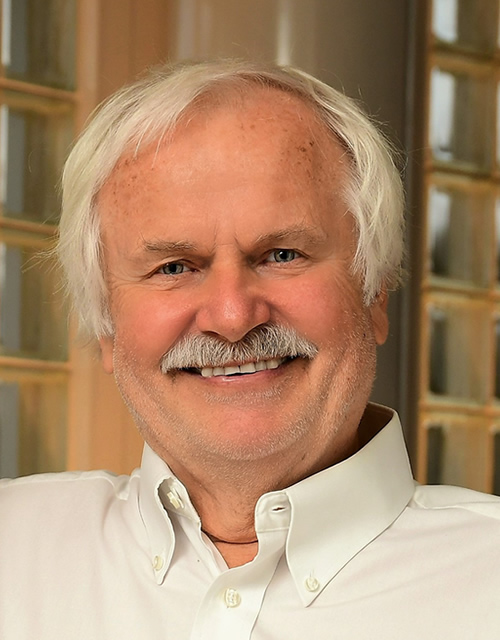
Johannes Ledolter

Johannes Ledolter (August 26, 1950 – November 5, 2023) was an American applied statistician. He was a chaired Professor of Business Analytics and Statistics/Actuarial Science at the University of Iowa as well as an emeritus Professor at the Vienna University of Economics and Business in Austria, and served as an associate investigator for the Iowa City VA Health Care System.

Ledolter was initially brought to the United States by the Fulbright Scholarship. He authored 10 books and more than 150 journal articles and chapters.

== Education ==
Ledolter earned a M.S. in statistics from the University of Wisconsin-Madison in 1972 and in Social and Economic Statistics from the University of Vienna in 1974. In 1975, he earned a PhD in statistics from the University of Wisconsin-Madison.

== Teaching and consulting ==
Ledolter taught beginning and advanced courses on statistical methods at the University of Iowa, Vienna University of Economics and Business, Institute for Advanced Studies, Stanford University, University of Chicago Booth School of Business, Yale University, and Princeton University.

He had consulted with the state of California, Ford Motor Company, Procter & Gamble, Celanese, American Express, Bemis Company, and the A1 Telekom Austria Group.

== Selected publications ==
- Ledolter, J. and Swersey, A.J.: Testing 1 – 2 – 3: Experimental Design with Applications in Marketing and Service Operations, Stanford University Press, 2007
- Ledolter, J. and VanderVelde, L.S.: Analyzing Textual Information: From Words to Meanings through Numbers, SAGE Publishing (Quantitative Applications in the Social Sciences), 2021.
