= Eric Chafe =

Eric Thomas Chafe
- Born: 1946 (age 79–80)
- Education: University of Toronto
- Occupation: Musicologist
- Organizations: Brandeis University

Eric Thomas Chafe (born 1946) is an American musicologist specializing in the music of Claudio Monteverdi, Heinrich Biber, Johann Sebastian Bach and Richard Wagner.

Chafe holds a PhD in musicology from the University of Toronto. He teaches at Brandeis University, near Boston. His former students include Nancy Raabe (Miller).

== Bibliography ==
- The Church Music of Heinrich Biber. Studies in musicology. Ann Arbor: UMI Research Press. 1987. p. 305. ISBN 0835717704. OCLC 15053153. Chafe1987.
- Tonal Allegory in the Vocal Music of J.S. Bach, University of California Press, 1991
- Monteverdi's tonal language (in French). New York: Schirmer Books. 1992. p. 442. ISBN 0028704959. OCLC 470332536. Chafe1992.
- Analyzing Bach cantatas. Oxford University Press. 2003. pp. XVII-286. ISBN 0-19-516182-3. OCLC 470375905. Chafe2003.
- The tragic and the ecstatic; the musical revolution of Wagner's Tristan und Isolde. Oxford University Press. 2005. p. 333. ISBN 019534300X. OCLC 233542079. Chafe2005.
- Bach's Johannine Theology: The 'St. John Passion' and the Cantatas for Spring 1725, New York, Oxford University Press, 2014
- Tears into Wine: J. S. Bach's Cantata 21 in its Musical and Theological Contexts, New York, Oxford University Press, 2015
