= Charlotte Schulz =

American visual artist

- Born: 1960 (age 65–66); Massillon, Ohio, United States
- Education: University of South Florida; Kent State University
- Known for: Drawing, painting
- Awards: John S. Guggenheim Fellowship, New York Foundation for the Arts, Pollock-Krasner Foundation
- Website: Charlotte Schulz

Charlotte Schulz (born 1960) is an American visual artist best known for intricate charcoal drawings, sometimes composed of multiple sheets that she tears, folds and distresses in order to disrupt the two-dimensional picture plane. Her work explores personal and collective responses to traumatic, often-public, experiences and events, interweaving vignettes of landscape, interiors, disasters and unexpected elements in dreamlike combinations that upend spatial and temporal conventions. Artillery critic Seph Rodney describes her drawings as works of "elegant and surreal lyricism" that are exquisitely rendered, thick with detail, and perplexing in their mix of fractured visual logic, overlapping realities, and speculative ruminations on space and time.

Charlotte Schulz, Suspended in the Midst of a Flood the Past Carries Itself into a Current Location and Pressures a Rescue from Geographical Forces, charcoal on paper, 34" x 40" x 4", 2010.

Schulz has been recognized with a Guggenheim Fellowship and awards from the Pollock-Krasner Foundation and New York Foundation for the Arts. She has had solo exhibitions at Smack Mellon, Aldrich Contemporary Art Museum and Mills College Art Museum, and been featured in group shows at the Weatherspoon Art Museum, Tampa Museum of Art, and Dorsky Gallery, among others. Schulz lives and works in Peekskill, New York and teaches at Parsons School of Design in New York City.

== Early life and career ==
Schulz was born Charlotte Lentner in the small working-class city of Massillon, Ohio in 1960. After studying art at Kent State University, she and her family moved to Florida, where she worked with painter Mernet Larsen and earned a BA degree at University of South Florida (1983). She later studied at Skowhegan School of Painting and Sculpture (1992) before returning to University of South Florida to complete an MFA degree in 1993.

After graduating, Schulz began to exhibit her paintings and drawings regionally, including shows at the John and Mable Ringling Museum of Art, Dunedin Fine Art Center, Society of the Four Arts, Tampa Museum of Art, and Lee Scarfone Gallery (solo); the Ringling show, curated by former Metropolitan Museum of Art curator Henry Geldzahler, led to the museum's purchase of her painting, Room of My Own (1992).

In 1999, Schulz moved to Brooklyn. She was awarded fellowships from the New York Foundation for the Arts and Aljira Center for Contemporary Art in 2001 and 2002, respectively. Her first solo museum show, "An Insufficiency in Our Screens" (2007), was held at the Aldrich Contemporary Art Museum and traveled to the Mills College Art Museum in Oakland in 2008. Her subsequent solo exhibitions have been held at Smack Mellon and Wake Forest University (2010) and Beacon Project Space (2015). Schulz has taught at Parsons School of Design since 2000.

=== Work and reception ===
Schulz indicates that two foundational interests have structured her art: space and narrative. Influenced by philosophers exploring malleable conceptions of space and time, such as Gaston Bachelard, Gilles Deleuze, Henri Bergson and Elizabeth Grosz, her work conveys multiple, proliferating views and a cinema-like temporality. She draws on personal history, art and poetry, news events and collective experiences for imagery; her early work was more personally focused, while since the mid-2000s, she has linked the personal with public and geopolitical issues such as the nature of violence and hatred, tragedy, terrorism and war, and the environment. Schulz's drawings evolve intuitively, often beginning with ideas from reading, which she develops in sketchbooks before rendering small sections of an image at length, often without a predetermined plan. Her delicate charcoal drawing technique has been noted by New York Times critic Benjamin Genocchio, among others, for its close observation and painstaking detail, heightened level of finish, and control of the medium's capabilities.

=== Early paintings ===
Charlotte Schulz, With head shorn she listens to the sleeper sleeping away the dream and dreaming the lives of an acquired wisdom, charcoal on paper, 17" x 14", 2000.

Schulz's early oil paintings arose out of the dislocation she felt following her parents' divorce and move to the alien suburban sprawl and tropical life of Florida. These large works explore memories, charged emotions and relationship to place, using a recurrent, intimate metaphor of a house set in suburban landscapes to represent the human psyche. In an effort to break from a single perspective format, Schulz reshaped styles and spatial treatments of the past—drawing on sources from Cezanne, Cubism and Giorgio de Chirico to traditional Chinese landscape painting and the early Renaissance (e.g., Giotto)—to create personal, contemporary statements. They employ subtle shifts between maze-like interiors and suburban scenes to create fictionalized, cinema-like narratives, informed in part by her reading of Bachelard's phenomenological work The Poetics of Space.

Curator Henry Geldzahler wrote that multi-view paintings like A Room of My Own suggest the complex ways we experience architecture through "an original amalgam of aspects of Futurism and American Surrealism." Other critics compared Schulz's stairways leading nowhere, unexpected doors and dreamlike, tilted rooms—in that work and others, such as Persephone's House With a Chimney (1995)—to the psychological architectures of 18th-century Italian visionary Giovanni Battista Piranesi's fantastical Carceri prison etchings.

=== Early drawings (1999–2005) ===
In the late 1990s, Schulz moved to Boston (and subsequently, Brooklyn). Finding herself in a crowded urban setting, with less workspace, she turned to modest-sized, single-sheet drawings made in charcoal that, while still personal, were also informed by imagery drawn from poets such as Wallace Stevens and Robert Kelly, philosophy and psychology. She relinquished the need to start with a structuring house image, instead taking an approach that upended seemingly fixed, opposed constructs like inside and outside, influenced by the fluid, non-Cartesian conception of space and events posited in Deleuze's The Fold: Leibniz and the Baroque.

These ideas were compatible with her interest in portraying shifts in thought and emotion, mysterious and portentous narratives, and movement in time rather than static scenes; the resulting works, including her "Inside the Monad" series, synthesize landscape, architecture, interiors, objects and weather elements. Critic Dominique Nahas described such drawings (e.g., With head shorn, she listens to the sleeper sleeping away the dream and dreaming the lives of acquired wisdom, 2002), as delicately detailed, intensely private, charged vignettes and "incantatory revelations" that "suggest the flitting of intertwined memories."

=== Mature drawings (2005– ) ===
Beginning in 2005, Schulz shifted to large-scale, intricate charcoal drawings composed of multiple sheets that she often tore, folded, bent and distressed, reshaping and disrupting the picture plane. These black-and-white works drew on diverse imagery and extensive reading, and increasingly, linked personal experience to collective, often-traumatic experiences, such as 9-11, Hurricane Katrina, and the assassination of Martin Luther King Jr. They employ a careful blending of charcoal and delicate erasure that interweaves vignettes of haunted landscapes and elegant interiors intruded upon by war and natural disasters amid the folded terrain, low relief and untouched voids of the paper.

Charlotte Schulz, Traversing an Open Interior, charcoal and pastel on paper, 47" x 39" x 1", 2017–8.

Schulz's surfaces function like screens onto which she projects and layers beliefs, emotions, and potential realities or parallel worlds to form purposefully disjointed narratives that suggest a contemporary psychological index; the language poetry-like titles she composes mirror the juxtaposition of visual elements. A 2010 Village Voice review describes her work as conveying complex moods moving between comfort and fear rather than clearly delineated narratives, and counts it among a "renaissance in the realm of the fantastical" for realist drawing. Formally, these later drawings explore tensions between real and illusionist space and the sculptural potential of paper, often taking on non-rectangular, object-like configurations that suggest physical, dynamic forces at play.

Schulz created the eight-panel drawing The Maximum of All Possible Hate Is Realized and We Cleave to Our Screens as It Unfolds in That Disquieting Way (2005) in response to the 9/11 attacks. Its sheets are arranged on the wall like dominoes (or story panels) and depict incongruous imagery: an airplane flying through a room, everyday domestic elements, explosions, scenes of passage and escape, a sheep on a platform. John Parks of Drawing describes it as "a potent and thoughtful reflection on how public events intrude on and redefine our private lives, and conversely, how our private lives intrude on and redefine history," also noting its ability to convey connections and correspondences unavailable to a simple linear narrative.

In Schulz's shows "An Insufficiency in Our Screens" (Aldrich Museum, 2007; Mills College, 2008) and "The Uneven Intensities of Duration" (2010, Smack Mellon; Wake Forest), the softer blending and merging of imagery in her earlier work gave way to razor-sharp detail, maximum contrast, and more dramatic, disruptive folds in her surfaces. These individual and multi-sheet drawings feature abandoned landscapes shot through with billowing darkness and light, dislocated interiors, and unexpected juxtapositions of size (tiny figures, vast spaces), non-sequiturs, symbols and collective memory (e.g., Suspended in the Midst of a Flood the Past Carries Itself into a Current Location and Pressures a Rescue from Geographical Forces, 2010). Reviews characterize this work as pristine and unsettling, photographically precise, and radically unstable like "optical obstacle courses"; Bay Area critic DeWitt Cheng describes Schulz's depiction of space as "episodic and contradictory, and impossible to grasp as a totality […] fractured, like our consciousness."

In her "The Impossibility of Keeping Borders" (2011–2) and "Incursion of Otherness" (2013–4) series, Schulz explored crinkled textures and torn, irregular edges to a greater degree, while continuing to address historic upheavals like the Arab Spring through puzzling juxtapositions of desolate landscapes, buildings with semi-transparent walls, and elements such as miniature rowboats, beds, and penguins. Her "Territory of Significance" (2015–6), "Groundlessness" (2017–8) and "Voyage" (2018–9) series increasingly suggest maps, both through their irregular, continent-like shapes and mash-ups of deconstructed, varied terrains and settings spilling over and growing out of folds and bends in the paper. Works such as An Early Map with No One to Say When the Ocean Begins or Traversing an Open Interior (both 2017) feature archaeological, geological and life forms seen from above suggesting timeless societal, environmental and internal processes taking place in a divided world.

Charlotte Schulz, Within a Great Wind a Vista Opens Up, oil on linen, 35" x 48", 2015–6.

=== Later paintings ===
After a long hiatus from painting, Schulz returned to it in 2012, incorporating insights gained from her charcoal drawings, while returning to the house motif of earlier work. Like her drawings, these paintings (e.g., Within a Great Wind a Vista Opens Up, 2016, from her "Becoming Nomadic" series) make connections between disparate images—some culled from Renaissance art, others contemporary—while using the house as an intermediary between inside, outside and a world in flux.

== Awards and public collections ==
Schulz has been recognized with fellowships from the John Simon Guggenheim Memorial Foundation (2010), New York Foundation for the Arts (2017, 2009, 2001), the Elizabeth Foundation for the Arts (2013), Aljira Center for Contemporary Art (2002), the State of Florida (1996) and Skowhegan School of Painting and Sculpture (1992), and a grant from the Pollock-Krasner Foundation (2005). Her work belongs to the permanent public collections of the Mills College Museum of Art, John and Mable Ringling Museum of Art, and University of South Florida, among others.
