= Victor LaValle's Destroyer =

2017 comic book limited series

Destroyer
- Issue #1 cover art by Micaela Dawn

Publication information
- Publisher: Boom! Studios
- Format: Limited series
- Genre: Horror
- Publication date: May – October 2017
- No. of issues: 6

Creative team
- Written by: Victor LaValle
- Artist(s): Dietrich Smith
- Letterer(s): Jim Campbell
- Colorist(s): Joana Lafuente
- Editor(s): Eric Harburn

Victor LaValle's Destroyer or simply Destroyer is a six-issue comic book limited series written by Victor LaValle with art from illustrator Dietrich Smith and colorist Joana Lafuente. The series was published by Boom! Studios from May–October 2017, which was later collected as a trade paperback in March 2018. It is a modern sequel to Mary Shelley's Frankenstein that tells the legacy of Dr. Frankenstein, looking at both his own descendants and Frankenstein's monster. Destroyer was well-received and won the 2018 Bram Stoker Award for Best Graphic Novel.

== Plot ==
When the last descendant of the Frankenstein family loses her only son to a police shooting, she turns to science for her own justice…putting her on a crash course with her family’s original monster and his quest to eliminate humanity.

== Reception ==
The comic series was well received by critics scoring an average rating of 8.3 for the entire series based on 35 critic reviews aggregated by Comic Book Roundup. Writing for Tor.com, Alex Brown felt that its commentary on race relations was its strongest element, although the additional topics touched on felt unfocused. Brown praised the creativity of the art making up the book, finding that the art, colors, and lettering all provided their own key contributions to the overall story.

=== Accolades ===
Destroyer was awarded the 2018 Bram Stoker Award for Best Graphic Novel in May 2019.
