= Surrounded by Silence (song) =

Single by Design the Skyline
- Released: March 12, 2011
- Recorded: 2010
- Genre: Mathcore; deathcore; electronicore
- Length: 4:12
- Label: Self-released
- Songwriter: Design the Skyline

Design the Skyline singles chronology
"Surrounded by Silence" (2011)	"Break Free from Your Life" (2011)

"Surrounded by Silence" is a song by the deathcore band Design the Skyline. The song was self-released by the band on March 12, 2011. "Surrounded by Silence" was covered by a considerable amount of music journalists, whom described the track as one of the worst songs ever.

An alternative mix of the track was included on Wax Vessel's 2021 vinyl release of Galactical Celebration as a bonus track.

== Recording, production and music video ==
In late 2010, the band filmed the video for 'Surrounded by Silence' with local production team Red Island Productions. The setting of the video consisted of the band playing on a set that rendered a forest, which was actually in a park located in downtown Corpus Christi. Other scenes in the video include the band playing in a cave with prop snow falling down on the members, which was designed from potato flakes and small pieces of cotton. The song was recorded with Red Island Productions and was officially released in March 2011.

== Criticism ==
Both the band and the song have received a lot of criticism for the former's appearance and the latter's sound.

The magazine Thrash wrote "that attention [for the band is] mostly negative due to the song [style] itself as well as the outward appearance of the band." Sergeant D, a writer of MetalSucks, wrote "I almost feel bad that nobody told these kids that scene is dead, because they probably think they are going to be rockstars."

In an interview about the criticism, Design the Skyline stated "At first [it bothered me, but] it [does] not anymore. People don't seem to realize that the "Surrounded by Silence" song was just a demo song and not every band sounds their best on their first demo, you know? And it's crazy how much it blew us up!"

== Personnel ==
- Eric Azure – lead vocals
- Daniel "Dani Doom" Garza – lead vocals
- Matt Ryan – lead guitar, programming
- Julian "Julian Reckless" Ibanez – rhythm guitar
- Ethan White – bass, clean vocals
- James "Keebler" Lemos – keyboards, programming
- John "Martian" Perkins – drums

== See also ==
- List of music considered the worst
