= Bones (2001 film) =

2001 American horror film by Ernest Dickerson

- Theatrical release poster
- Directed by: Ernest Dickerson
- Written by: Adam Simon; Tim Metcalfe
- Produced by: Rupert Harvey; Peter Heller; Lloyd Segan
- Starring: Snoop Dogg; Pam Grier; Khalil Kain; Clifton Powell; Bianca Lawson; Michael T. Weiss
- Cinematography: Flavio Labiano
- Edited by: Michael N. Knue; Stephen Lovejoy
- Music by: Elia Cmiral
- Production companies: The Lloyd Segan Company; Heller Highwater Productions
- Distributed by: New Line Cinema
- Release date: October 26, 2001
- Running time: 96 minutes
- Country: United States
- Languages: English; French; Spanish
- Budget: $16 million
- Box office: $8.4 million

Bones is a 2001 American supernatural black horror film directed by Ernest Dickerson and starring rapper Snoop Dogg as the eponymous Jimmy Bones, a murdered numbers runner that rises from the grave to avenge his death. The film is presented as a homage to blaxploitation films of the 1970s and incorporates numerous elements from the genre.

It initially met with negative reviews and a dismal box-office performance, but has since been reappraised as a cult classic, especially for Snoop Dogg’s performance, the practical effects, and Dickerson's direction.

== Plot ==
In 1979, Jimmy Bones is a numbers runner who is loved in his neighborhood as its member and protector. He is betrayed and brutally murdered by corrupt cop Lupovich and drug pusher Eddie Mack who then force Jimmy's associates Jeremiah and Shotgun to take turns stabbing him to death. His lover Pearl, who had been the only one to refuse, tries to kill herself instead but is stopped by Jimmy who proceeded to protect her. This results in Pearl taking her dress and burying him with it. Afterwards, Bones' elegant brownstone building becomes his own tomb and is closed.

Twenty-two years later, the neighborhood has become rundown because Bones' absence cleared the way for drugs to enter the neighborhood. Four teens, Patrick, his brother Bill, their step-sister Tia and their best friend Maurice, buy the Bones house to turn it into a nightclub. In the process, Tia finds a black dog who is actually the physical manifestation of Jimmy's spirit. As the dog kills and eats meat and victims, Jimmy is slowly resurrected.

Patrick meets Pearl, who remains in the neighborhood, and her daughter Cynthia, whom he immediately is attracted to. Exploring the basement, Patrick, Cynthia, Bill, Tia, and Maurice find Jimmy Bones' remains and realize he was actually murdered. The five decide to keep quiet about the murder and bury the remains. Jeremiah, father to Patrick and Bill and Tia's stepfather, finds out about their plan to open the club at Bones' old building. He freaks out and demands that Patrick and the others leave the building. Patrick, Bill, and Tia refuse his request and open the nightclub, in spite of their father's objections. On opening night, Maurice is lured into an upstairs room and mauled to death by the black dog, fully resurrecting Jimmy.

Jimmy proceeds to set the club on fire, scaring off the club goers, and begins his revenge. Shotgun, now an alcoholic from the guilt of killing Jimmy, tells Pearl how they should have burned the building down a long time ago. After the incident, Pearl admits to Cynthia that Jimmy Bones is her father, as she had a relationship with him. Jimmy first confronts a guilt-ridden Shotgun and mercy kills him in an act of forgiveness. Patrick confronts his father and demands to know if he helped murder Jimmy Bones twenty-two years earlier. Jeremiah admits to betraying Bones to make money and leave the neighborhood, having been fed up living in Bones' shadow. He also allowed drugs into the neighborhood as long as he got paid for it.

Later, Jimmy confronts Eddie Mack and decapitates him, keeping the head alive and containing his soul. He does the same to Lupovich. Pearl, knowing that Jeremiah is next, goes with Cynthia to his house to rescue him. They end up being too late. Pearl, Cynthia, Patrick, Bill, Tia and Jeremiah's wife Nancy watch him get dragged off by Jimmy, leaving nothing but a melted hole in the window. Jimmy brings Jeremiah back to his old house, along with the heads of Lupovich and Mack. Jimmy sends Lupovich and Mack to hell for all eternity while Jeremiah begs for his life.

Patrick, Cynthia, Bill, and Pearl go underground to find that Jimmy Bones' body has disappeared. Pearl tells them that in order to put Jimmy to rest, they have to destroy the dress she wore the night Jimmy was murdered which was buried alongside him, as his blood which splattered onto it still contains his spirit and is the only thing keeping him anchored to the world of the living. As they look for Jimmy, Pearl steps in the elevator which closes and goes up. Meanwhile, Jeremiah asks Jimmy what he wants. He asks Jeremiah if he could give him his life back. When Jeremiah says he can't do that, Jimmy sends him to hell.

Pearl gets off the elevator and walks into a room that is filled with ignited candles. She has a flashback and Jimmy appears and puts the bloody dress on her. Patrick, Cynthia, and Bill head to the second floor where they see a ghostly Maurice, who leads Bill in the wrong direction where he is captured and killed. Patrick tries to reach him but is too late. Patrick and Cynthia make their way to the room where Pearl and Jimmy are; Patrick knows it is a trap. As Cynthia is lured to Pearl and Jimmy, Patrick hears his father's voice in a mirror begging for help. When Patrick hesitates, Jeremiah chokes him. Patrick uses his knife to chop Jeremiah's arm off and he disappears into hell. Patrick goes after Jimmy, who grabs Patrick by the throat as Cynthia begs him to let go. Pearl, realizing what is happening, tells Jimmy she loves him before grabbing a candle and setting herself and the dress on fire.

As Jimmy and Pearl both die together, Patrick and Cynthia escape, barely making it out before the entire building collapses. Before jumping to safety, Cynthia is briefly pulled back into the building by an unseen force (her father possessing her after his previous anchor, the bloody dress, was destroyed by Pearl). Outside, Patrick finds an old picture of Jimmy and Pearl as Jimmy's face turns to him and says, "Dog eat dog, boy." Too late, Patrick realizes that Cynthia has Jimmy's blood within her, and turns around as Cynthia, now possessed by Jimmy, smiles at him and vomits a mouthful of maggots into his face.

== Cast ==
- Snoop Dogg as Jimmy Bones
- Pam Grier as Pearl
- Michael T. Weiss as Detective Al "Loopy Lou" Lupovich
- Clifton Powell as Jeremiah "J-Bird" Peet
- Ricky Harris as Eddie Mack
- Bianca Lawson as Cynthia
- Khalil Kain as Patrick Peet
- Merwin Mondesir as Bill Peet
- Sean Amsing as Maurice
- Katharine Isabelle as Tia Peet
- Lynda Boyd as Nancy Peet
- Linda Chow as Jeremiah's First Wife
- Chaka White as Foxy Lady
- Ronald Selmour as "Shotgun"
- Deezer D as "Stank"
- Garikayi Mutambirwa as "Weaze"
- Erin Wright as "Snowflake"
- Josh Byer as Jason
- Kirby Morrow as Palmer
- Ellen Stephenovna Ewusie as The Death Lady
- Boyan Vukelic as Young Detective
- Marcus Moldowan as Young Patrick
- Primo The Dog as Bones The Dog
- Alina Kaufman as Jenny (uncredited)

== Soundtrack ==
The soundtrack to the film was released on October 9, 2001, by Doggystyle Records and Priority Records. It peaked at number 39 on the US Billboard 200, number 14 on the Top R&B/Hip-Hop Albums chart, and number 4 on the Top Soundtracks chart.

== Reception ==
Bones received generally negative reviews and has a 28% rating on Rotten Tomatoes, based on 72 reviews, with an average rating of 3.9/10. The critical consensus reads, "Slow to start, the sleek looking Bones is more silly than scary." On Metacritic, the film has a weighted average score of 42 out of 100, based on 21 critics, indicating "mixed or average" reviews. Audiences polled by CinemaScore gave the film an average grade of "C+" on an A+ to F scale.

Spence D. of IGN commended Dickerson's direction and Snoop's performance but felt the film overall cribbed too heavily from A Nightmare on Elm Street, The Omen and the Amityville Horror films for a script that fails at social commentary and tonal consistency, concluding that "Injecting humor into a horror picture is one thing, but when the horror and the comedy become indistinguishable that's when you know you're in trouble." Mike Clark of USA Today felt that Dickerson's talents were wasted in directing this "wannabe chiller" and was only brought in to fulfill a studio mandate for Halloween, concluding that, "[I]f grossness gives you the giggles, at least a couple of the movie's effects indeed put a little "wow" in this cinematic bowwow." Mick LaSalle of the San Francisco Chronicle criticized the film for being "ill-conceived" with its plot structure and not focusing more on Snoop's character and his revenge tale.

Entertainment Weekly's Owen Gleiberman gave the movie a "B" grade, saying it "may be pure trash, but it's trash made with the kind of oozy psychedelic zest" found in A Nightmare on Elm Street 3: Dream Warriors. Stephen Holden of The New York Times praised Snoop's portrayal of the title character, saying he's "ultimately scarier than most conventional Hollywood monsters", and Dickerson for infusing the film with "a special glee and an unusual density of scary imagery."

Ed Gonzalez of Slant Magazine noted how the film's cinematography and horror images borrowed elements from Dario Argento's Suspiria, concluding that "[T]he film's decapitated-head-aplenty [sic] (Note: As "decapitation" means the removal of the head, heads cannot themselves be decapitated; rather, once a body is decapitated, its head is severed.) finale is ludicrously overwrought, but who cares when a socially conscious horror flick gives death such a fabulous mac daddy face?" The Austin Chronicle's Marc Savlov gave praise to Snoop as the titular character for showcasing his potential as an actor and Dickerson for utilizing horror tropes to great effect, saying "If you can put aside your love of logic and sense and just go with the spookshow flow of Dickerson's funky little flick, you'll love it."

The film opened at number 10 at the U.S. box office, earning $2,823,548 in 847 theaters its opening weekend averaging $3,333 per theater. It ended up earning $7,316,658 domestically and $1,062,195 internationally for a total of $8,378,853, falling short of its $16 million budget.

== Legacy ==
Since its release, the movie has enjoyed a cult following. Alan Dorich in Comic Book Resources highlights how Snoop Dogg’s portrayal of Jimmy Bones, a vengeful ghost, was central to the film's charm: "Snoop’s likability helped sell Jimmy's persona as a numbers runner who was also a beloved citizen," he writes, noting how the actor’s charisma made the ghost's transition from a beloved figure to a menacing spirit believable. Furthermore, Dorich praises the actor’s ability to bring humor to the role, especially with lines like, "I got a natural high -- a supernatural high!" which “in the hands of a lesser actor, these quips might have come across as corny, but in Snoop’s hands, they worked perfectly.” Tom Moore, in Collider, also recognizes the film's importance, stating that Bones deserves more praise, calling it "an often overlooked gem within the horror genre," and noting that its "cult status" has grown over time. Moore appreciates Ernest Dickerson’s direction, particularly his ability to balance horror and humor, and his use of vibrant visuals, stating that Dickerson’s cinematographic background contributed to the film’s "comic book-like" look, enhancing its supernatural atmosphere. Similarly, Kahana Dumont in Shadow & Act echoes this sentiment, emphasizing that while Bones was initially a "box office or critical failure," its charm and "campy" elements, along with its social commentary, have helped it find a lasting place in the genre.

== Cast and director's reception ==
In retrospect, Snoop Dogg said: "It was fly, it was for the Halloween season, I enjoyed doing it!" Actress Bianca Lawson stated: “I turned 21 on this film and had the best time working with Pam Grier, Snoop Dogg and our wonderful director, Ernest Dickerson.“

In the 2019 Shudder documentary Horror Noire: A History of Black Horror, Director Ernest Dickerson states that New Line Cinema did not know how to properly promote the film without veering into stereotype or marketing it as something broader than just a ‘Black movie’.

In a December 2024 interview with Bootleg Kev, Snoop Dogg defended Bones, explaining that, while the film might not have been "great" to some, it was pivotal for his acting career. He highlighted the valuable experience of working with a talented cast, including Pam Grier, Ricky Harris, and Clifton Powell. Snoop also credited director Ernest Dickerson, for challenging him to take his acting more seriously. Prior to Bones, he was mostly playing versions of himself, but the experience taught him to tackle more complex, distant roles, marking a shift in his approach to acting. He reassess his statement in another interview: “I feel like that movie was written very well. It was shot well. It was cast exceptionally. A great storyline. Got Pam Grier and Snoop Dogg on screen at the same time. And it's a horror movie. People love to be scared. They love movies that keep you on the edge of your seat, and I believe Bones did that.“

== See also ==
- J. D.'s Revenge
- Race in horror films
- Black horror
