= Horror Noire (film) =

2021 horror film

- Directed by: Zandashé Brown; Robin Givens; Rob Greenlea; Kimani Ray Smith
- Written by: Tananarive Due; Steven Barnes; Ezra Claytan Daniels; Victor LaValle; Shernold Edwards; Al Letson
- Starring: see below
- Music by: EmmoLei Sankofa
- Production companies: Swirl Films; AMC Studios
- Distributed by: Shudder
- Release date: October 28, 2021
- Country: United States
- Language: English

Horror Noire is a 2021 American anthology Black horror film directed by Zandashé Brown, Robin Givens, Rob Greenlea and Kimani Ray Smith, and written by Tananarive Due, Steven Barnes, Ezra Claytan Daniels, Victor LaValle, Shernold Edwards and Al Letson. A follow-up to the 2019 documentary film Horror Noire: A History of Black Horror, the features six stories: "Daddy," "Bride Before You," "Brand of Evil," "The Lake," "Sundown" and "Fugue State".

The film was released on October 28, 2021 by Shudder.

== Cast ==
- Tony Todd as Pike
- Peter Stormare as Erebus
- Lesley-Ann Brandt as Abbie
- Rachel True as Charlotte
- Lenora Crichlow as Mrs. Clay
- Lavell Crawford as Samuel
- Sean Patrick Thomas as Mr. Clay
- Malcolm Barrett as Dr. Berry
- Erica Ash as Shanita
- Tyriq Withers as Cornelius
- Lauren Buglioli as Ashley
- Brandon Mychal Smith as Nekani
- Luke James as Red
- Tone Bell as Marcus
- Elizabeth Roberts as Rachel
- Kearia Schroeder as Loretta
- Tabyana Ali as Regina

== Reception ==
Critic from the Josh at the Movies gave it 2.5/5 stars writing: "The compiled talent for Horror Noire is the biggest draw here; unfortunately, the stories themselves are quite a mixed bag." Chris Catt from the Creepy Catalog gave it a positive review and noted the final segment, “Sundown”. Joel Fisher from the Battle Royale With Cheese also gave it a positive review writing: "Horror Noire is a unique perspective on horror and for those aficionados of the genre then they may even have fun finding the references within."

== See also ==
- Horror Noire: A History of Black Horror
- Black horror
