= Black horror =

Horror subgenre

Black horror (also known as racial horror and horror noir) is a horror subgenre that focuses on African-American characters and narratives. It often involves the use of social and political commentary to compare themes of racism and other lived experiences of Black Americans to common horror themes and tropes. Early entries in the genre include the Spencer Williams Jr. film Son of Ingagi (1940), and George A. Romero's film Night of the Living Dead (1968), which is considered one of the first Black horror films because its lead role is played by a Black actor, Duane Jones. Blaxploitation horror films of the 1970s, namely Blacula (1972) and the vampire film Ganja & Hess (1973), became prominent examples of the genre. Other examples appeared during the 1990s, including the Bernard Rose film Candyman (1992) and Tales from the Hood (1995), an anthology film directed by Rusty Cundieff which has been described as the "godfather of Black horror".

Black horror became especially popular after Get Out, a horror film about racism and the 2017 directorial debut of comedian Jordan Peele, became an international box office success, winning the Academy Award for Best Original Screenplay. Peele went on to direct the Black horror films Us (2019) and Nope (2022). He also produced the HBO Black horror television series Lovecraft Country (2021), and the film Candyman (2021) directed by Nia DaCosta, a sequel to the 1992 film of the same name. Some critics argued that, by 2020, Black horror had entered its Golden Age, while others criticized many of the Black horror projects that followed Get Out—including Lovecraft Country, the Amazon series Them (2021), and the film Antebellum (2020)—as unsubtle and exploitative of Black trauma.

Black horror novels include Brown Girl in the Ring by Nalo Hopkinson (1998), Fledgling by Octavia E. Butler (2005), The Gilda Stories by Jewelle Gomez (1991), and The Ballad of Black Tom by Victor LaValle (2016).

== Definition ==
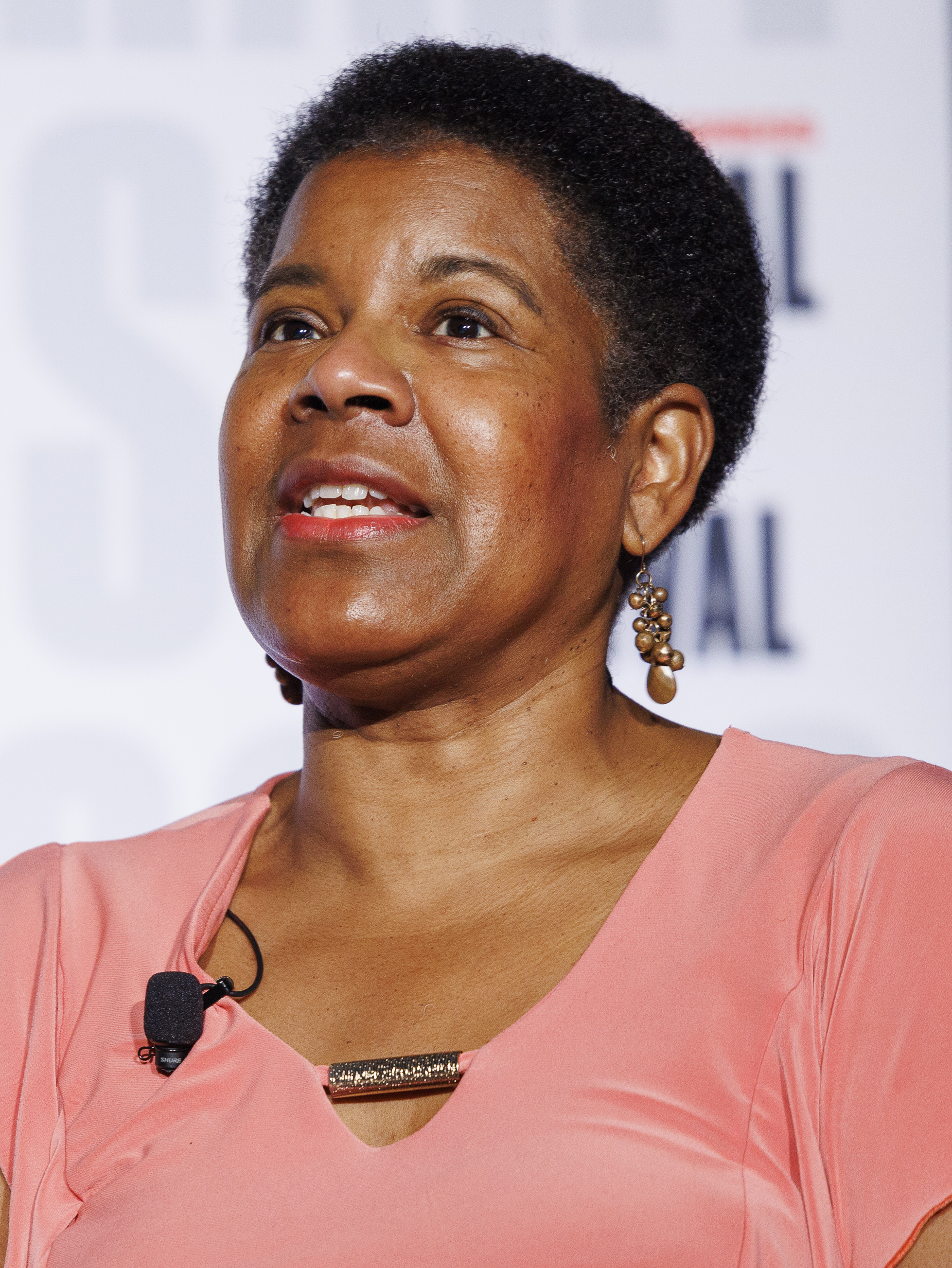
Tananarive Due (pictured), a University of California, Los Angeles professor and Black horror author and historian, has defined the genre of Black horror as "star[ring] black protagonists to tell a black story". She has been called the "Queen of Black horror".

Black horror is typically defined as horror created by Black people, featuring Black protagonists or other prominent characters, and centered around Black culture. Robin R. Means Coleman, a professor at Texas A&M University and the author of the 2011 book Horror Noire: Blacks in American Horror Films from the 1890s to Present, wrote in 2019 for The Conversation that Black horror films were "created by blacks, star blacks or focus on black life and culture". Tananarive Due, a Black horror author and professor at University of California, Los Angeles who has been called the "queen of Black horror" and, as of 2019, teaches classes on Black horror, stated that Black horror "doesn't necessarily have to be made by Black creators" but that it typically "is made by Black filmmakers and does star black protagonists to tell a Black story". She added, "Sometimes it is enough just to have a Black character in a film for it to be considered Black horror." She also defined Black characters in Black horror films as "actually hav[ing] agency in the film and maybe even surviv[ing]" while exceeding the stereotypical roles of Black characters in horror films "who were just sidelined or monster bait". Black horror is also sometimes referred to as racial horror or horror noir.

Commentators have described Black horror as being largely informed and inspired by Black history, particularly through its common theme of perseverance. In the 2019 documentary Horror Noire: A History of Black Horror, Due stated, "Black history is Black horror." Ryan Poll, for the Journal of the Midwest Modern Language Association, wrote, "For African Americans, horror is not a genre, but a structuring paradigm," adding that horror works "because White people fundamentally imagine the world without horror". Due has stated that a more common theme than race in Black horror is "the will to fight back and survive against overwhelming force". Means Coleman and author Mark Harris, owner of the website Black Horror Movies, similarly wrote in their book The Black Guy Dies First: Black Horror Cinema from Fodder to Oscar that "the Black presence in horror, as in America, has always been about resilience".

Black horror films often compare the lived experiences of Black people to horror narratives, depicting them through themes of racism and its effects, such as police brutality, the Atlantic slave trade, lynching, discrimination and transgenerational trauma. Jenna Benchretrit of CBC wrote that Black horror was "an expansive subgenre that reclaims the Black community's place in a film tradition where they have often been the first to die or are depicted as the monster". Mark Harris compared the horror film trope of killing off Black characters first to marginalization, stating, "It epitomises how black characters in these movies and then other genres tend to be kind of second fiddle, thus expendable and so they get bumped off." For Vulture, Robert Daniels defined Black horror films as horror films "directed by and starring Black folks". Stephanie Holland of The Root also described Black horror films as horror films "that feature prominent Black stories and heroes" despite horror not having "always been the most welcoming [genre] for Black characters". Jason Parham of Wired wrote that Black horror filmmakers "let loose arguments about class conflict or policing or the psychological terror of race, and how whiteness eats at the mind".

Black horror also frequently imparts messages about social, political, or moral issues. Tonja Renée Stidhum of The Root wrote that racial and social commentary were "basically the core of the genre, historically". Laura Bradley of The Daily Beast noted that Black horror films often focus on "the fear of moral corruption, particularly by proximity to white people and institutions" and frequently include references to Christianity. For Refinery29, Ineye Komonibo wrote that Black horror films are "often ...imparting a moral lesson or highlighting some political struggle within our society".

== Film and television ==
=== Precursors ===
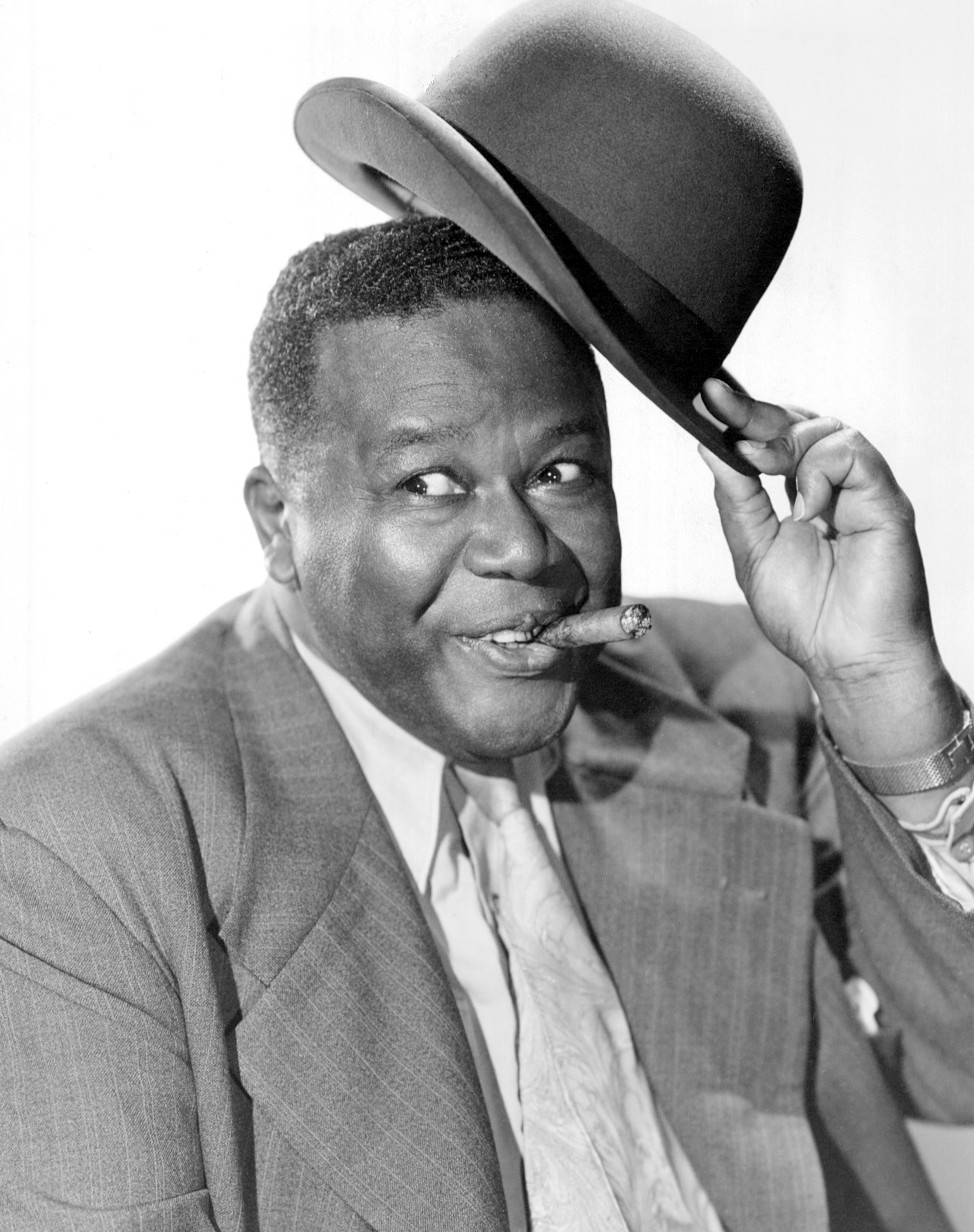
The 1940 film Son of Ingagi, written by Spencer Williams Jr. (pictured), has been described as one of the first Black horror films for its all-Black cast and fleshed out Black characters.

Before the first Black horror films were created, American horror films scarcely featured Black actors. Those that did often did so mockingly or depicted them as primitive in the vein of D.W. Griffith's 1915 film The Birth of a Nation. Black actors occasionally appeared in lead roles in horror films, such as Joel Fluellen's role of Arobi in the 1957 film Monster from Green Hell or Georgette Harvey's role of Mandy in the 1934 film Chloe, Love Is Calling You, or in voodoo films like Ouanga (1936), which starred Fredi Washington as the mistress of a plantation owner, but even those roles were largely in the service of helping white characters. Black actors Willie Best and Eddie "Rochester" Anderson became well known in the 1930s for their servant roles in monster movies, in which they typically exaggeratedly bulged their eyes in shock before running away, but they often fed into racial stereotypes. According to Due, Black characters in horror films were often relegated to tropes such as the Magical Negro, Sacrificial Negro, or the Spiritual Guide. The 1922 Oscar Micheaux horror race film The Dungeon and the Spencer Williams Jr. films Son of Ingagi (1940), which was written about a mad scientist who brings a primate creature to life and was the first science fiction horror film to have an all-Black cast, and The Blood of Jesus (1941) are considered some of the earliest Black horror films. Ashlee Blackwell, a cowriter of Horror Noire: A History of Black Horror, stated that Son of Ingagi "fully flesh[ing] out its black characters" was "revolutionary"; Tabie Germain of BET called Son of Ingagi "a trailblazer for its time and a major milestone in Black film history". Jon O'Brien of Inverse called it "the first true Black horror" and wrote that its portrayal of its all-Black cast in "a positive light" was "a revolutionary move for the time".

=== 1960s to 2000s: Blaxsploitation and 1990s resurgence ===
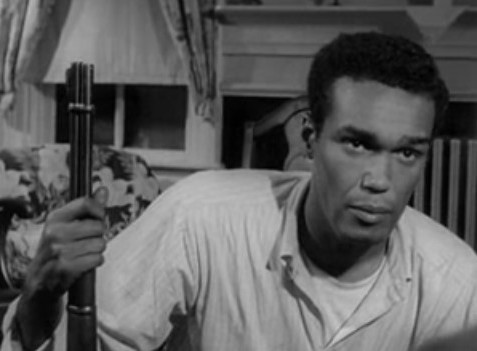
Duane Jones as he appears in Night of the Living Dead (1968)

The George A. Romero film Night of the Living Dead (1968) is considered one of the first Black horror films and highly influential on the genre of Black horror overall for its casting of Duane Jones, a Black actor, in its lead role of Ben. In contrast to previous depictions of Black people in horror films as ineffectual, he was written to be smart, resourceful and heroic, and was also one of horror's first Black protagonists. The film also ends with Ben being shot and killed by a group of white vigilantes, who proceed to burn him in a manner comparable to lynching. Due framed the scene in the context of the assassination of Martin Luther King Jr., which took place earlier that year.

The Blaxploitation genre of the 1970s, which also featured predominantly Black casts and creators and was targeted towards Black audiences, also produced numerous Black horror films. Blacula (1972) was directed by Black director William Crain and starred William Marshall, who altered the script in order to make it more socially conscious, as Prince Mamuwalde, the first Black vampire portrayed on screen. In it, Prince Mamuwalde begs for Count Dracula not to support the Atlantic slave trade before being bitten by him and turned into a vampire, later waking up in 1972 after his coffin is opened by antique dealers. Its box office success led to the creation of more Black horror films. Its 1973 sequel, Scream Blacula Scream, starred Pam Grier as the voodoo high priestess and African spirituality historian Lisa. The Bill Gunn–directed Black horror film Ganja & Hess (1973) also starred Jones and won the Critics' Choice award at the Cannes Film Festival upon its release. According to Polygon's Max Deering, it was a cult classic of Black horror by 2025. Other Blaxploitation horror films of the 1970s included Blackenstein (1973), Abby (1974), Sugar Hill (1974) (one of the first horror films to feature a Black woman in its lead role), Dr. Black, Mr. Hyde (1976) and J. D.'s Revenge (1976), all of which gained popularity and became early examples of Black horror.

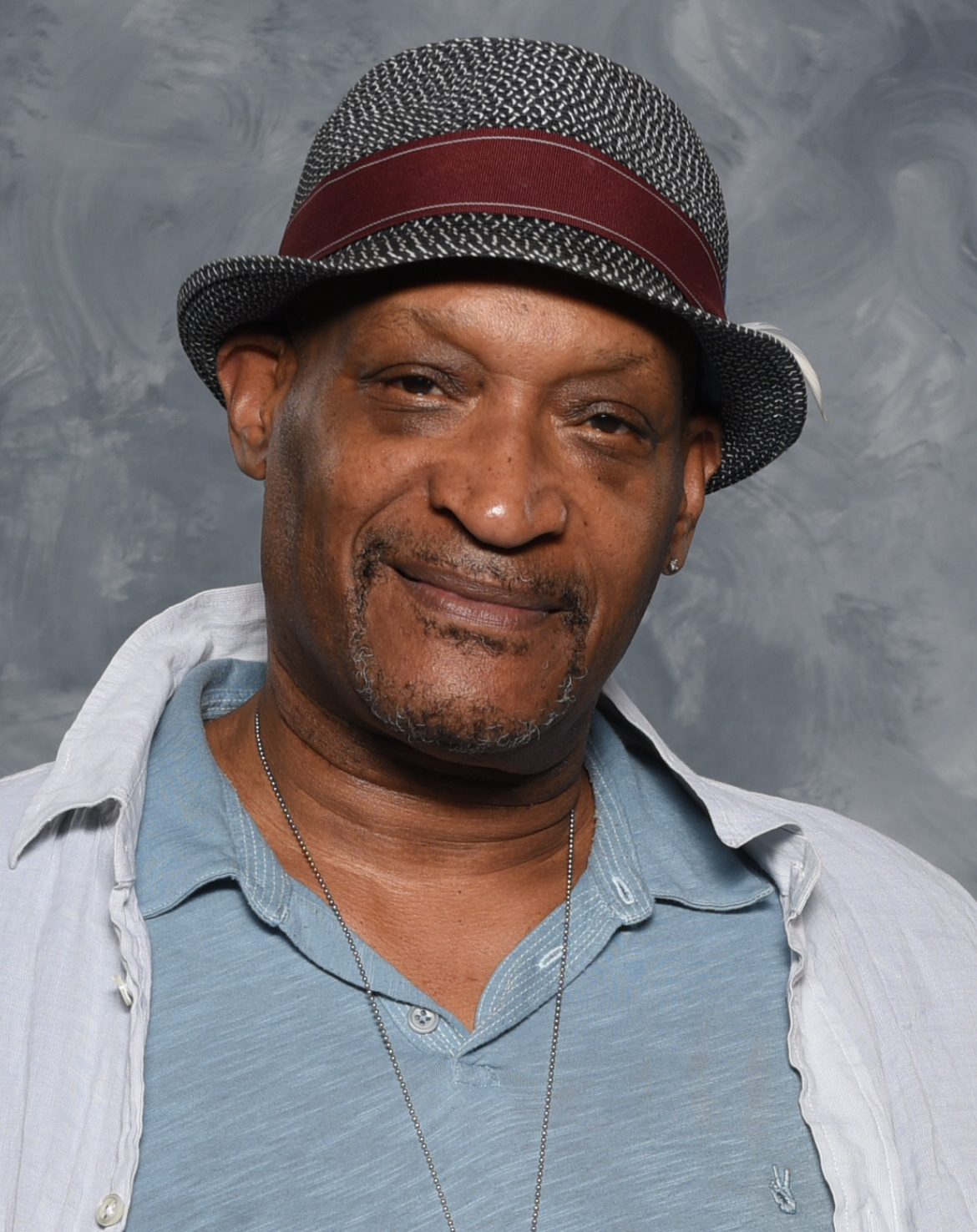
Tony Todd has been referred to as the "king of Black horror" for his portrayal of the eponymous villain in the 1992 Black horror film Candyman

The 1990s saw a resurgence of Black horror films, which, according to educator Mikal Gaines, was a result of and concurrent with a boom in hood films, such as New Jack City (1991) and Juice (1992), during the decade. It was partly fueled by the release of the Bernard Rose film Candyman (1992), which cast Tony Todd, a Black actor, as the film's titular villain, while also addressing lynching and housing inequality, particularly in the Cabrini–Green housing projects in Chicago. Sonaiya Kelley of the Los Angeles Times called it "inarguably one of the most seminal black horror films" and described Todd's character as "the first black supernatural killer depicted onscreen". Todd has been referred to as the "king of Black horror" for his role therein. The success of the 1989 urban film Do the Right Thing was also partly responsible for the uptick in Black horror films which followed. including the Troma Entertainment films Def by Temptation (1990), directed by James Baldwin III, and Bugged! (1997), directed by Roland K. Armstrong; the Wes Craven films The Serpent and the Rainbow (1988), The People Under the Stairs (1991) and Vampire in Brooklyn (1995); Demon Knight (1995), which starred Jada Pinkett Smith as Jeryline, who became one of the first Black final girls in horror, and Bones (2001), both directed by Ernest Dickerson, who Means Coleman has described as a "stalwart of the genre" of Black horror; and Reginald Hudlin's short film The Space Traders, (1994), adapted from the short story of the same name by Derrick Bell. The Kasi Lemmons film Eve's Bayou (1997), the Jonathan Demme film Beloved (1998), an adaptation of Toni Morrison's novel of the same name, and the films Leprechaun in the Hood (2000), Queen of the Damned (2002), and Blade are also considered Black horror films.

The politically conscious anthology horror film Tales from the Hood (1995), directed by Rusty Cundieff and executive produced by Spike Lee, features four Black horror stories about issues impacting Black Americans: police corruption, domestic violence, white supremacy and gang violence, respectively. Cundieff described it as "deal[ing] with problems in the African-American community and showing how the scariest things that happen to you are the human things that happen to you" while using "the supernatural as a redemptive element". It became a cult classic and Isaura Barbé-Brown of the British Film Institute wrote that it was "important to the history of horror and to Black horror in particular" for being "laced unabashedly with inside jokes specifically aimed at a Black audience". It has been described as the "godfather of Black horror" by Camilo Hanninbal Smith of the Houston Chronicle and director Bomani J. Story.

Following the poor box office performance of Bones in 2001, Black horror largely died down until 2017, with the exception of the 2014 Spike Lee film Da Sweet Blood of Jesus, which was a reimagining of the film Ganja & Hess (1973).

=== 2017 to present: Get Out and surge in Black horror projects ===
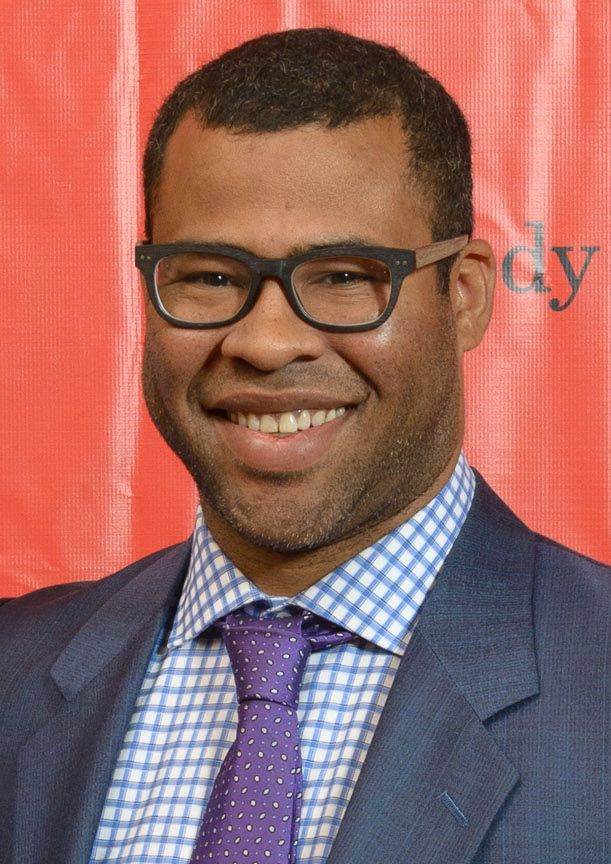
Get Out (2017), the directorial debut of Jordan Peele (pictured), is often credited with widely popularizing Black horror

Black horror was brought to international prominence through the release of Jordan Peele's 2017 directorial debut Get Out, a horror film about racism, race relations and microaggressions. It follows Chris Washington, played by Daniel Kaluuya, who leaves Brooklyn to visit the family of his white girlfriend, Rose Armitage, played by Allison Williams, in a white suburb, where it is revealed that they partake in medical experimentation on Black people. The film also opposed the notion of a post-racial America following Barack Obama's election as president of the United States in 2008. For The Hollywood Reporter, Richard Newby wrote that Peele "changed the game" with Get Out, which "managed to encompass the horror blacks experience on a scale unlike any we'd seen before". In 2023, Bethonie Butler of The Washington Post wrote that Get Out "upped the ante when it came to discourse about horror and race" and that "few films ... have come close to the social commentary that made Get Out a cultural phenomenon", while Nick Schager of The Daily Beast wrote that it "ushered in a wave of Black horror films and TV series that investigate and exploit modern and historical racial dynamics for monstrous thrills". For his writing of the film, Peele won the Academy Award for Best Original Screenplay, making him the first African-American winner of the award, and the film's international $225 million gross led to a surge in other Black horror projects. Black horror directors William Crain, Rusty Cundieff and Justin Simien also stated that the success of Get Out offered more opportunities for Black horror filmmakers.

Peele continued to explore Black horror in his follow-up films, Us (2019), which explored themes of social class, and Nope (2022), which criticized American spectacle. After the release of Us, Chris Vognar of the Houston Chronicle opined that one "could argue [Peele] is the best" to bring "a distinctively black flavor to the horror-movie genre", while Due stated that Us was "not as directly about race as Get Out". Peele went on to produce other Black horror films and television series of the 2010s and 2020s, including Candyman (2021), a sequel to the 1992 film of the same name directed by Nia DaCosta, who became the first Black female director of a film that debuted at number one in the U.S. box office. It starred Yahya Abdul-Mateen II as the titular character and focused on police brutality and gentrification. Peele also produced Lovecraft Country (2020), an HBO series created by Misha Green and based on a 2016 novel of the same name by Matt Ruff. In it, a Black family living in the United States during the Jim Crow era of the 1950s must combat racism while fighting monsters inspired by the works of H. P. Lovecraft, who held racist beliefs. The 2019 Shudder documentary film Horror Noire: A History of Black Horror, which was executive produced by Due, directed by Xavier Burgin, and based on the 2011 book of the same name by Means Coleman, chronicled the history of the genre of Black horror and interviewed Black horror filmmakers and actors. An anthology Black horror film featuring six films by Black directors and writers, also titled Horror Noire, was released on Shudder in 2021 as a follow-up to the documentary.

Other Black horror films released in the late 2010s and 2020s included The First Purge (2018), the Tales from the Hood sequels Tales from the Hood 2 (2018) and Tales from the Hood 3 (2020), The Boy Behind the Door (2020), Kindred (2020), Black Box (2020), Antebellum (2020), Bad Hair (2020), Spell (2020), Vampires vs. the Bronx (2020), Two Distant Strangers (2020), Sweetheart (2019), His House (2020), Master (2022), Nanny (2022), Karen (2021), Wendell & Wild (2022), Haunted Mansion (2023), The Angry Black Girl and Her Monster (2023), The Blackening (2023), Criblore, A Horror Anthology (2023), The Deliverance (2024), The Front Room (2024), The Woman in the Yard (2025), and Him. New Fear Unlocked, a subsidiary of Tommy Oliver's production studio Confluential Films dedicated entirely to Black horror, was founded in 2024. The 2019 Tate Taylor film Ma, which featured Octavia Spencer in its lead role as the outcast Sue Ann, has also been described by critics as a Black horror film, though Doreen St. Félix of The New Yorker wrote that "we should [not] mistake [Ma] for being a contribution to black horror" due to how the film downplays Sue Ann's Blackness. Ryan Coogler's 2025 film Sinners was also described by critics as a Black horror film, partly for its campy elements, with Njera Perkins of HuffPost crediting it for "putting Black horror back in the spotlight" and Flood Magazine's Bee Delores calling it a Black horror film that "shift[ed] the conversation". For Here and Now, Robin Young stated soon after its release that Sinners was "challenging what we understand about Black horror films".

Black horror television series of the time included the Amazon series Them (2021), the first season of which focused on a Black family in the 1950s moving to a white section of Compton, California and facing racial violence and the second of which followed a murder mystery; The Other Black Girl (2023), an adaptation of the 2021 novel of the same title by Zakiya Dalila Harris about a woman who is the only Black person working at a publishing company; and Swarm (2023).

According to critic Robert Daniels, "expectations for conversations about racism and structural inequities" led to "the advent of serious-minded Black horror" following the release of Get Out. In her book Imperiled Whiteness: How Hollywood and Media Make Race in "Postracial" America, Penelope Ingram wrote that the 2010s and the 2020s were a "renaissance of Black horror" spurred by the success of Peele's films, while Means Coleman and writers from CNN and Entertainment Weekly argued that Black horror had entered its Golden Age by 2020.

==== Criticism ====
Several Black horror films and television series made after Get Out (2017), including Lovecraft Country (2020), Antebellum (2020), and Them (2021), were decried by critics and audiences for violently exploiting Black trauma, particularly in the wake of the murder of George Floyd, and lacking subtlety in their depictions of racism. For The Daily Beast, Nick Schager wrote that most Black horror after Get Out, including Lovecraft Country, Them, Antebellum, and Candyman (2021), was "ho-hum at best and reductive at worst, failing to strike a successful balance between gory genre kicks and novel sociopolitical insights". For Collider, Tavius Allen suggested that many of the Black horror films and series inspired by Get Out, such as Antebellum and Them, "tend to have an exploitative angle", "frequently entertain a larger white audience", and strip their Black characters of agency "at the mercy of grotesque violence, demeaning language, or reaffirmed stereotypes". In 2023, Nadira Goffe of Slate opined that "the same bag of tricks ... defined much of Black horror" in the years prior, such as "the dangers of whiteness" and "the protagonist's dawning realization that 'I got what I wanted, but it wasn't what I thought it would be'". She wrote that the trope in Black satirical horror of "Black women's hair as a tortured metaphor for racial assimilation", which showed up in The Other Black Girl (2023), Bad Hair, and the Black surrealist film They Cloned Tyrone (2023), was "exhausting" for "perpetuating the myth of 'good' and 'bad' hair" and representing misogynoir. For Vulture, Angelica Jade Bastién wrote in 2025 that films made during the "modern Black horror boom" often made "laborious, rote choices" in order to make "racial strife clear to non-Black audiences". Both she and Quinci LeGardye of Marie Claire praised Sinners for having more effective messaging and allegories than many of the Black horror films released after Get Out.

Critics also criticized films inspired by Get Out as attempting to piggyback off of its success despite lacking its substance. In a review of the film Karen (2021), Briana Lawrence wrote for The Mary Sue, "There has been a rallying cry to have more Black horror that isn't just racism bad y'all, but time and time again we keep getting films that tell us what we already know because, 'That's why you liked Get Out so much, right?'" Charles Pulliam-Moore of Gizmodo Australia wrote in 2021, "In chasing Get Out's success, a number of studios seemingly lost sight of the reality that the movie wasn't good simply because it was a 'Black horror movie' about racist bodysnatchers." Allen argued that most Black horror to come from Get Out missed its point, writing, "It's not the reliving of the trauma that guides Get Out, it's the overcoming." Jason Parham of Wired criticized Them and Two Distant Strangers (2020) for not being "aware horror is not solely about horror", unlike Get Out and the television series Atlanta (2016). Cate Young of The American Prospect wrote that Black horror films and television series released after Get Out—particularly Antebellum, Bad Hair (2020), and Lovecraft Country—"ultimately fail because they do not do the hard ideological work necessary to give them the cultural and political meaning to which they aspire" and because of their "reckless deployment of spectacle over substance".

== Literature and art ==
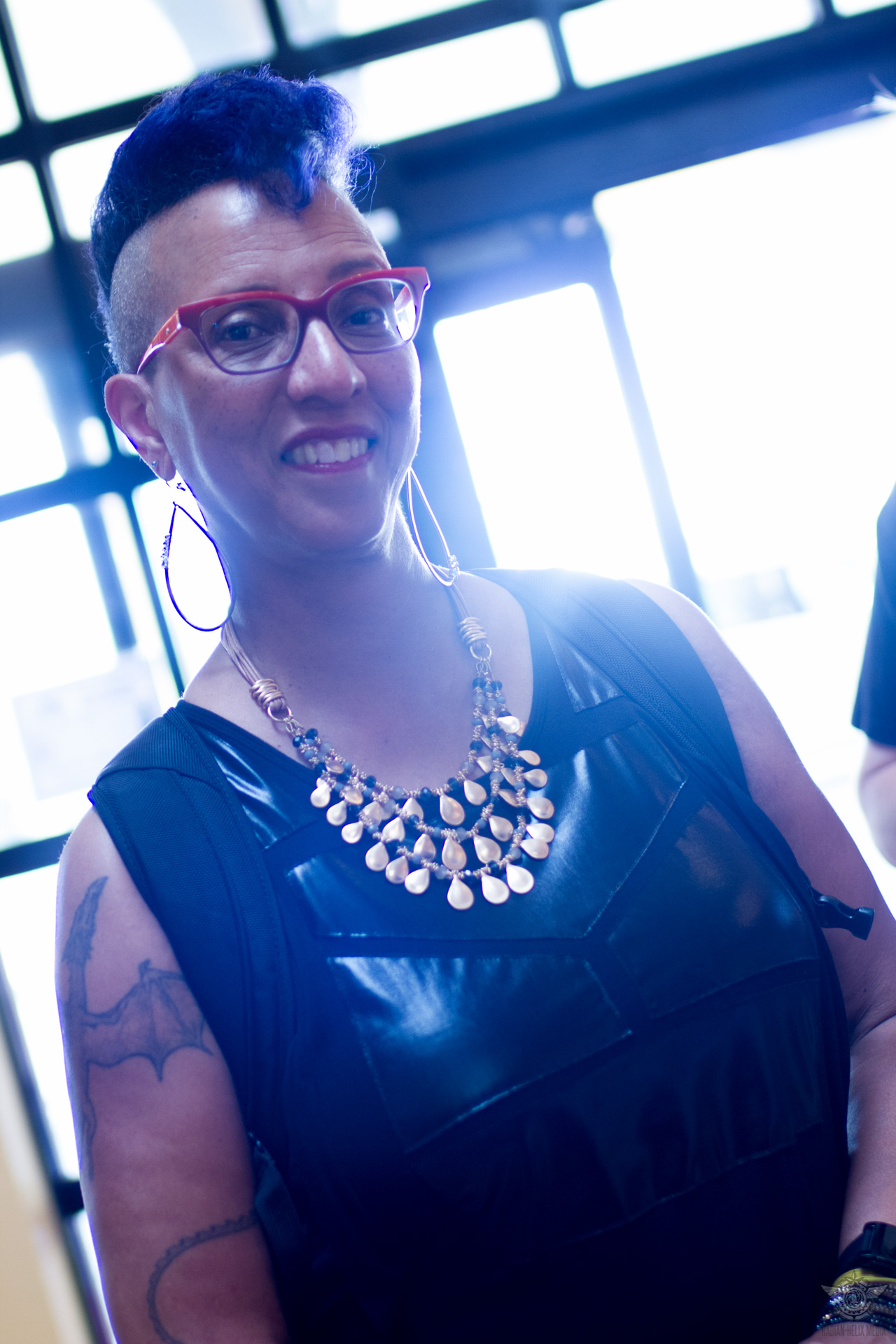
Black horror author Linda Addison (pictured) was the first Black author to win the Bram Stoker Award.

For T, Gabrielle Bellot noted the influence of African-American folklore figures, namely Br'er Rabbit, and the 1899 short story collection The Conjure Woman by author Charles W. Chesnutt on Black horror. She also described the artworks of Kara Walker, the Betye Saar painting Black's Girl Window (1969), and the written works of authors Nalo Hopkinson, Octavia E. Butler and Jewelle Gomez as progenitors of Black horror, and named the 1967 painting The American People Series 20: Die by Faith Ringgold a piece of Black horror in visual art.

Black horror novels include Due's The Between (1995) and My Soul to Keep (1997), Gomez's The Gilda Stories (1991), Butler's Bloodchild and Other Stories (1995) and Fledgling (2005), Morrison's Beloved (1987), Hopkinson's Brown Girl in the Ring (1998), Victor LaValle's The Ballad of Black Tom (2016) and The Changeling (2017), Tiffany D. Jackson's White Smoke (2021), Zakiya Dalila Harris's The Other Black Girl (2021), and Johnny Compton's The Spite House (2023). Jordan Peele edited Out There Screaming: An Anthology of New Black Horror, which compiled short Black horror stories by various authors, and it was released in 2023. The young adult Black horror anthology book The Black Girl Survives In This One, which focused on Black female final girls, was edited by Desiree S. Evans and Saraciea J. Fennell and released in 2024. The Black horror comics anthology Shook! A Black Horror Anthology was released in 2024 by Dark Horse Comics and Second Sight Publishing.

In 2001, Black horror author Linda Addison became the first Black author to win the Bram Stoker Award. She was later awarded the Horror Writers Association's Lifetime Achievement Award in 2017. After Get Out was released, Black horror authors such as Addison, LaValle, Steven Van Patten, whose works addressed racism through horror, found wider audiences.

== See also ==
- Race in horror films
- Southern Gothic
- Speculative fiction
