= Robin R. Means Coleman =

American author, scholar and educator

- Born: Robin R. Means Coleman; 1969 (age 55–56)
- Education: Bowling Green State University (PhD)
- Occupations: Author; communication scholar; educator

Robin R. Means Coleman (born 1969) is an American author, communication scholar, and educator known for her work in the fields of Afro-American studies, African studies, and media studies. She has written on the topic of race in horror films, and in particular representations of Black people in horror films, in her 2011 non-fiction book Horror Noire: Blacks in American Horror Films from the 1890s to Present (which was adapted into a 2019 documentary film), as well as in the 2023 book The Black Guy Dies First: Black Horror Cinema from Fodder to Oscar, which she co-authored with Mark H. Harris.

== Early life and education ==
Coleman was born in 1969 in Pittsburgh, Pennsylvania, and earned her Bachelor of Arts in communication at Chatham College. She went on to receive a Master of Arts in communication from the University of Missouri, and earned her PhD in mass communication from Bowling Green State University in Bowling Green, Ohio.

== Career ==
In August 2016, Coleman was instated as the Associate Dean for Academic Programs and Initiatives at the University of Michigan's Rackham Graduate School. Prior to her position at the University of Michigan, Coleman held Coleman held academic positions at the University of Pittsburgh and New York University.

In 2018, Coleman was named vice president and associate provost for diversity at Texas A&M University. In February 2021, Coleman left Texas A&M University to join Northwestern University in Evanston, Illinois, in the same roles; in addition to these positions, she also held a faculty role at Northwestern University's School of Communication.

== Partial bibliography ==
- African-American Viewers and the Black Situation Comedy: Situating Racial Humor (1998)
- Say It Loud! African American Audiences, Media and Identity (2002)
- Horror Noire: Blacks in American Horror Films from the 1890s to Present (2011)
- The Black Guy Dies First: Black Horror Cinema from Fodder to Oscar (with Mark H. Harris, 2023)
