= Rachel True =

American actress

- Born: Rachel India True; November 15, 1966 (age 60); New York City, New York, U.S.
- Occupation: Actress
- Years active: 1990–present

Rachel India True (born November 15, 1966) is an American actress best known for her roles in films such as The Craft (1996), Nowhere (1997), and Half Baked (1998). True is also known for her leading role as Mona Thorne on the UPN sitcom Half & Half (2002–2006).

== Early life and education ==
Rachel India True was born in on November 15, 1966 in New York City, the middle child of three. Her father is of Ashkenazi Jewish descent, whereas her mother is of African American heritage. Her younger sister, Noel, is also an actress. True attended New York University.

== Career ==
True made her television debut in 1991 on the Cosby Show episode "Theo's Final". In 1993, she moved to Los Angeles and made her feature film debut playing Chris Rock's character's girlfriend in the comedy CB4. On television, she appeared in episodes of Hangin' with Mr. Cooper, Beverly Hills, 90210, Getting By, The Fresh Prince of Bel-Air, Family Matters, Dream On and well as made-for-television movies Moment of Truth: Stalking Back (1993) and A Walton Wedding (1995). In 1995, she had supporting role in the erotic horror film Embrace of the Vampire starring Alyssa Milano.

In 1996, True landed her breakthrough role as Rochelle Zimmerman in the supernatural horror film, The Craft, where she played a member of a teenage coven. True stated that she had to "fight" to audition for the part and was actively going up against her future co-stars Fairuza Balk, Neve Campbell and Robin Tunney. Her role was originally written for a white actress, but that didn't deter her from auditioning. In 1997, she starred in the comedy-drama film, Nowhere alongside James Duval, the film received mixed reviews from critics. The following year, True starred as Dave Chappelle's romantic interest in the comedy film, Half Baked. Also from 1997 to 1998, she also had the recurring role of Janet Clemens on The Drew Carey Show. From 1999 to 2000, she appeared in the ABC drama series, Once and Again.

True appeared in a number of independent movies, include With or Without You (1999), The Big Split (1999), and Groove (2000). She starred alongside Monica and Essence Atkins in the 2000 romantic drama film Love Song. From 2002 to 2006, True starred with Essence Atkins in the UPN comedy series, Half & Half, as paternal half-sisters who barely knew each other until becoming adults. She returned to film, playing the supporting role in the 2007 comedy The Perfect Holiday. The following years, she appeared in a number of smaller and made-for-television films, include The Asylum productions Social Nightmare (2013), Blood Lake: Attack of the Killer Lampreys (2014), Sharknado 2: The Second One (2014), and Sharknado: Heart of Sharkness (2015). In 2017, True worked as a tarot-card reader in Echo Park.

She appeared in horror films Agnes and Horror Noire in 2021. The following year, she joined the cast of the second season of Amazon Prime Video comedy series, Harlem. Also that year, True was cast in Half Baked 2, the sequel to the 1998 cult comedy, reprising her role as Mary Jane Potman.

== Publications ==
True released her book, True Heart Intuitive Tarot, Guidebook And Deck in 2020.

== Filmography ==
=== Film ===
Year	Title	Role	Notes
1990	A Girls' Guide to Sex	Bridget	TV movie
1993	CB4	Daliha	
1993	Moment of Truth: Stalking Back	Katie	TV movie
1995	A Walton Wedding	Girl Student	TV movie
1995	Embrace of the Vampire	Nicole	
1996	The Craft	Rochelle Zimmerman	
1997	Nowhere	Mel	
1998	Half Baked	Mary Jane Potman	
1998	With or Without You	Misha	
1999	The Big Split	Jenny	
1999	The Apartment Complex	Tasha	
1999	The Auteur Theory	Sasha Swann	
2000	Groove	Beth	
2000	Love Song	Renee	TV movie
2002	New Best Friend	Julianne Livingston	
2007	The Perfect Holiday	Brenda	
2009	The Killing of Wendy	Ayanda	
2009	Pink Eye	Wygenia	Short
2011	Thugs, the Musical!	Lisa Rowlands	Short
2012	Noah	Temba (voice)	
2012	Sugar Mommas	Thomasina	TV movie
2012	White Room: 02B3	Three	Short
2013	Social Nightmare	Mrs. Langran	TV movie
2014	Blood Lake: Attack of the Killer Lampreys	Marcy	TV movie
2014	Sharknado 2: The Second One	1st Officer Jonni Valentine	TV movie
2015	A House Is Not a Home	Simi Valley 911 Operator (voice)	
2015	Sharknado: Heart of Sharkness	Herself	
2017	Stage Fright	Melissa Ameia	TV movie
2017	Limelight	Mrs. Roberts	
2017	Good Grief	Pepper	
2018	The Manor	Doctor Tryvniak	
2021	Assault on VA-33	Sasha	
2021	Agnes	Sister Ruth	
2021	Horror Noire	Charlotte	
2024	Half Baked: Totally High	Mary Jane	

=== Television ===
Year	Title	Role	Notes
1991–92	The Cosby Show	Nicki	Guest Cast: Season 7-8
1993	Hangin' with Mr. Cooper	Yvette	Episode: "Boyz in the Hoodz"
1993	Getting By	Andrea	Episode: "The Suit"
1993	Renegade	Dawn	Episode: "Vanished"
1993	Beverly Hills, 90210	Jan Myler	Recurring Cast: Season 4
1993	Tall Hopes	-	Episode: "Scalped"
1993	Thea	Candy	Episode: "Artie's Party"
1993	The Fresh Prince of Bel-Air	Rhetta	Episode: "Take My Cousin... Please"
1994–95	Dream On	Linda Castorini	Guest: Season 4, Recurring Cast: Season 6
1995	Family Matters	Sue	Episode: "What's Up Doc?"
1997	Boston Common	Cheryl	Episode: "To Bare Is Human"
1997–98	The Drew Carey Show	Janet Clemons	Recurring Cast: Season 3
1998	Damon	Monique	Episode: "The Last Cub Scout"
1999–2000	Once and Again	Mali	Recurring Cast: Season 1
2000	Providence	Talia Weber	Episode: "Family Ties"
2001	Dawson's Creek	Kira	Episode: "Hopeless"
2002–06	Half & Half	Mona Rose Thorne	Main Cast
2006	Noah's Arc	Brooklyn	Episode: "Give It Up"
2006–08	Kathy Griffin: My Life on the D-List	Herself	Recurring Cast: Season 2 & 5, Guest: Season 3-4
2007	E! True Hollywood Story	Herself	Episode: "Kathy Griffin"
2017	Being Mary Jane	Tiffany	Episode: "Feeling Seen"
2019	Better Things	Pascal	Episode: "Show Me the Magic"
2019–21	The Boulet Brothers' Dragula	Herself/Guest Judge	Episode: "Halloween Haunt" & "Monsters of Rock"
2020	History of Horror	Herself	Episode: "Witches"
2022	Queer for Fear	Herself	Episode: "Episode #1.2 & #1.4"
2022	Family Reunion	Cheryl	Episode: "Remember When the Raccoon Crashed the Wedding?"
2023	Harlem	Aimee	Recurring Cast: Season 2

== Awards and nominations ==
Year	Awards	Category	Recipient	Outcome
1997	Fangoria Chainsaw Awards	Best Supporting Actress	"The Craft"	Nominated
