= Deep South (film) =

1937 film

- Directed by: Leslie Goodwins
- Produced by: Bert Gilroy
- Starring: Willie Best
- Distributed by: RKO
- Release date: 1937
- Country: United States
- Language: English

Deep South is a 1937 American short film directed by Leslie Goodwins. It was nominated for an Academy Award at the 10th Academy Awards in 1937 for Best Short Subject (Two-Reel).

== Cast ==
- Willie Best
- Daisy Bufford
- Clarence Muse
