= Zack Williams (actor) =

American actor (1884–1958)

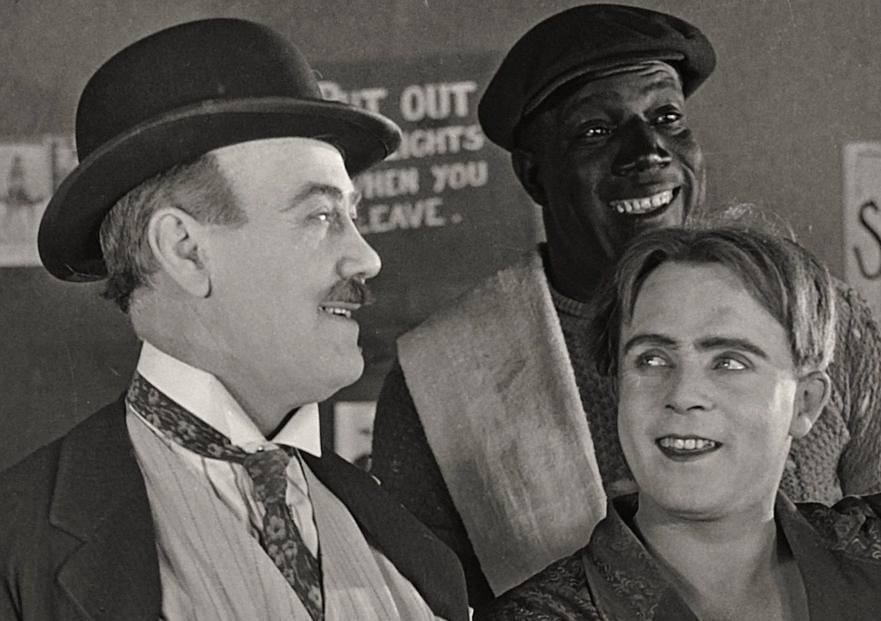
- In the 1922 film Pardon My Glove (center)
- Born: October 6, 1884; Louisiana, U.S.
- Died: May 25, 1958 (aged 73); Los Angeles, California, U.S.
- Occupation: Actor

Zack Williams (6 October 1884 – 25 May 1958) was an American actor. He appeared in numerous films including leading roles as in Son of Ingagi. His career spanned silent films from the early 1920s to talkie (sound) films of the late 1940s. He appeared with other black actors in the 1929 film Hearts in Dixie.

== Filmography ==
- The Money Changers (1920) as Wesley Shiloh Mainwaring
- The Killer (1921) as Aloysius Jackson
- The Lure of Egypt (1921) as Theodore
- The Gray Dawn (1922) as Sam
- The Yankee Clipper (1927)
- Court Martial (1928) as Negro
- The Four Feathers (1929)
- The Lady Fare (1929)
- Hearts in Dixie (1929) as Deacon
- Madonna of the Streets (1930) as Blink
- Queen of the Jungle (1965) as Garu
- Murder in Swingtime (1937)
- Son of Ingagi (1940) as N'Gina
- Jungle Goddess (1948) as Chief M'benga
