= Racism in early American film =

Racism in early American film is the negative depiction of racial groups, racial stereotypes, and racist ideals in classical Hollywood cinema from the 1910s to the 1960s.

From its inception, Hollywood has largely been dominated by white male filmmakers and producers, catering to a predominantly white audience. Various techniques have been used to depict non-white characters including whitewashing and ethnic stereotyping. Themes of white supremacy and xenophobia are commonly found within these films, reflecting contemporary attitudes towards non-white groups, taking on different imagery as race relations shift.

== 1910s–1930s ==
=== African Americans ===
In February 1915, the film The Birth of a Nation by D. W. Griffith was released. The film depicted Ku Klux Klansmen as the saviors of the nation that brought back a stable government and upheld American values. The movie used actors in blackface to depict African Americans as mindless, lustful savages, portraying them as an active danger to White Americans to justify violence against them. After the movie's debut, racial violence against African Americans increased, including the revival of the Ku Klux Klan in November of the same year.

In 1927, the film The Jazz Singer by Alan Crosland was released, regarded as being the first sound film. One of the central themes was the use of blackface by Jewish character Jack Robins. The use of blackface in the film has led to controversy, particularly in regards to its role in the plot and its Jewish character.

Scholar Corin Willis said about the use of blackface in The Jazz Singer:

In contrast to the racial jokes and innuendo brought out in its subsequent persistence in early sound film, blackface imagery in The Jazz Singer is at the core of the film's central theme, an expressive and artistic exploration of the notion of duplicity and ethnic hybridity within American identity. Of the more than seventy examples of blackface in early sound film 1927–53 that I have viewed (including the nine blackface appearances Jolson subsequently made), The Jazz Singer is unique in that it is the only film where blackface is central to the narrative development and thematic expression.

=== East Asians ===
Many racist tropes of East Asian peoples were codified in early Hollywood films. The entertainment industry of the West has shaped and perpetuated the public's perception of East Asian people by using harmful stereotypes like the model minority, dragon lady, and the violent Asian man to just name a few. These tropes and stereotypes stem from the long-standing history of violence and racism towards Asian people by and in the West.

==== "Good Asian" v.s. "Bad Asian" ====
Charlie Chan (based on the real Chang Apana), was depicted as a "good Asian", used as an antithesis to Fu Manchu, the "bad Asian" villain. In 1929, the American film The Mysterious Dr. Fu Manchu, starring Warner Oland as the villain Fu-Manchu, was released. The villain Fu-Manchu incorporated contemporary Yellow Peril motifs, an antagonist to white characters and demonstrating otherworldly powers to control the white female lead.

The Show of Shows was released the same year and featured a stereotypical setting with Nick Lucas and Myrna Loy.

==== "Dragon Lady" trope ====
Anna May Wong was the first Chinese American movie star, commonly featured in Hollywood films as supporting characters or "Dragon Lady" villainesses during the early 1920s. Anti-miscegenation laws prevented onscreen interracial relationships, forcing Wong to remain in stereotypical "vamp" roles until Daughter of the Dragon in 1931.

==== "Lotus Blossom" trope ====
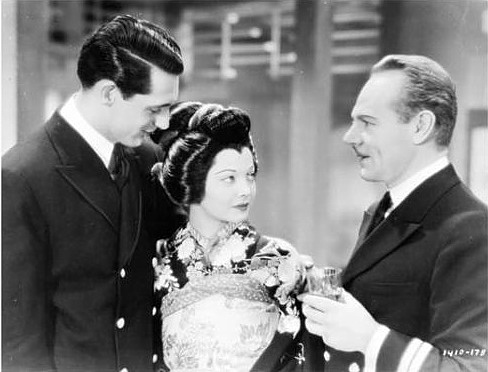
Cary Grant, Sylvia Sidney, and Charlie Ruggles in Marion Gering's 1932 film adaptation of Madame Butterfly.

The trope of the "lotus blossom" was also often pushed in early Hollywood to depict East Asian women as docile, innocent, and submissive. The "lotus" stereotype stems from racist and misogynistic rhetorics that are often perpetuation by Western media. The "lotus blossom"- also known as the "China doll", "giesha girl", or "porcelain doll" is a summation of the sexual fetishization of Asian women by white men. These characters are often hyper sexualized and objectified - written so that their Asian identity is merely used to play into western, white, male fantasies. This trope is heavily used in the 1898 short story Madame Butterfly, by John Luther Long. The story pushes the concept of a submissive and sexualized Japanese woman who is in need of a white man to save her - lending to a white and western audience or the "white gaze". Media like Madame Butterfly has played a significant role in shaping and perpetuating stereotypes that continue to harm Asian women immensely.

=== Native Americans ===
During the silent film era, Native American characters did not talk much; when synchronized sound made its way into the theaters in the thirties, the distortion took a different magnitude. The characters spoke an alien-sounding language that often was not a genuine Native language, therefore excluding Natives from the audience and increasing their misrepresentation. Their English dialogue was sometimes shot spoken backwards and later printed in reverse so that a new artificial "Indian" language was heard.

Throughout the early 1900s, many films that perpetuated stereotypes about Native Americans were made, in particular, the stereotype of the "Noble Savage".

The vanishing Indian trope that radiates through the dominant discourse, peaking in the early 20th century, is a white American construction that laid the ground for the reinforcement of the Indian enemy image and erasure of the good Indian stereotype. Although the demographic growth that started in the 1930s proved otherwise, the Western culture and Indian stereotypes steeped deep in the American consciousness to the point of obliteration of Native identity.

Another striking example of the mechanism explored above would be King Vidor's Northwest Passage (1940), a work used in the wake of the United States' involvement in World War II by the National Education Association to teach children the necessity of engaging in a fight for freedom. Taking place in 1759 in the time of the French and Indian War, the film is a vivid testimony to the historical moment during which it was produced. The climate was indeed comparable to the 1910s and the War raging in Europe probably played a large part in the nationalist perspective the movie displays. However the use of such a film as an educational ideological tool implicitly made the Natives an analogy to being the enemy. In this context, the Natives could only be depicted as outright antagonists. In Imagined Communities (1983), Benedict Anderson shows that "nation-ness" is but a cultural artefact that commands "profound emotional legitimacy" and establishes boundaries, new frontiers, "beyond which lie other nations". The Natives, and the "savage" archetype in particular, would then correlate with the enemy abroad, both of them being delineated outside the realm of nationality.

The effects of this bias have affected the recent portrayals as well.

=== South Asians ===
Several Hollywood movies continue to portray Asian destinations as underdeveloped or being lived in by backward, ignorant people. An example of this is showing elephant as a primary mode of transport in modern India.

=== West Asians ===
In 1921, Paramount Pictures released the Rudolph Valentino movie The Sheik. The movie itself was a box office success but showed Arabs as savage beasts who auction off their own women. The film was followed up a few years later with The Son of the Sheik, which also portrayed racist overtones. Rudolph was even asked by a New York Times reporter once whether or not his well-off character could fall for a savage (an Arab woman). To Valentino's credit, he responded by saying: "People are not savages because they have dark skins. The Arabian civilization is one of the oldest in the world…the Arabs are dignified and keen brained." In his essay "Arabs in Hollywood: An Undeserved Image", Scott J. Simon argues that of all the ethnic groups portrayed in Hollywood films, "Arab culture has been the most misunderstood and supplied with the worst stereotypes":

Rudolph Valentino's roles in The Sheik (1921) and The Son of the Sheik (1926) set the stage for the exploration and negative portrayal of Arabs in Hollywood films. Both The Sheik and The Son of the Sheik represented Arab characters as thieves, charlatans, murderers, and brutes.

He also singled out A Son of the Sahara (1924) as "the strongest subconscious attack on the Arab culture of all the Arab movies of the 1920s".

== 1940s–1960s ==
In the 1940s, people like Dudley Dickerson were appearing in Three Stooges films. Dudley was used because of his bug-eyed appearance and portrayal of stereotypes of the time. The prevailing views in Hollywood at the time helped to prevent him from advancing his career, but he never complained about his line of work and actually enjoyed what he was doing. A later Stooges short, The Yoke's on Me, showed a stereotypical view of the Japanese people.

Movies of the era showed began to increase the stereotypes that previous generations had started. The Charlie Chan and Fu Manchu stereotypes began to increasingly become more active in movies. Republic Movies released a fifteen episode serial Drums of Fu Manchu, which was later released into a feature film. This brought back the Fu Manchu stereotype after a few years of inaction in Hollywood. The "Devil Doctor" stereotype was absent from film between 1940 and 1965.

In 1961, the romantic comedy Breakfast at Tiffany's came out and took the audience by storm. The film centers on Audrey Hepburn's character Holly Golightly as she navigates moving to the glamorous New York City. In the film, Holly has a Japanese neighbor named Mr. Yunioshi who is played by Mickey Rooney in yellowface. The film depicts Mr. Yunioshi with a thick Japanese accent and as someone who is loud, clumsy, and unintelligent. These character traits reflect the West's perception and stereotyping of Asian people as foreigners. The film is often glamorized and romanticized by viewers, while the blatant racism and stereotyping is often overlooked.

Arab stereotypes also played into the film of the time. This included the use of belly dancers and billionaires. The bellydancer stereotype first occurred on film in 1897 when Thomas Edison's kinetoscope showed the women dancing.

== See also ==
- Portrayal of East Asians in Hollywood
- Portrayal of Native Americans in film
- Racism in horror films
- Stereotypes of Arabs and Muslims in the United States
- Stereotypes of East Asians in the United States
- Stereotypes of African Americans
- Stereotypes of Hispanic and Latino Americans
- Stereotypes of Native Americans
