= Lauren Buglioli =

American actress

- Born: Los Angeles, California, U.S
- Occupation: Actress
- Years active: 2003–present

Lauren Buglioli is an American actress. Her first notable role was in the 2020 psychological horror film Transference followed the title role in the horror-comedy Courtney Gets Possessed (2022). Buglioli also had supporting roles in films Horror Noire (2021), Vendetta (2022), A Jazzman's Blues (2022) and Cinnamon (2023). In 2023, she played Kaitlin Fox in the Netflix crime miniseries, Florida Man.

== Life and career ==
Buglioli was born in Los Angeles, California, but raised in London. She later returned to United States and lived in New York for ten years before moving to Atlanta for appearing in television series Tyler Perry's Young Dylan, The Oval, Dynasty and Queens. She played minor roles in films Unstoppable (2004) and Bad Boys for Life (2020) and in 2020 played the lead in the thriller film, Transference. The following year, Buglioli starred in three movies for LMN: Brutal Bridesmaids, Best Friends Forever and Secrets on Sorority Row. In 2022, she played the title role in the horror-comedy film Courtney Gets Possessed and appeared in the period drama film A Jazzman's Blues. The following year, Buglioli co-starred in the Netflix miniseries Florida Man and had secondary role in the thriller film, Cinnamon.

In 2024 she appeared in films The Neon Highway and The Great Lillian Hall and had the recurring role in the Apple TV+ comedy series, Bad Monkey. That same year, she was cast Vanessa McBride in the CBS soap opera, Beyond the Gates. It premiered in February 2025.

== Filmography ==
=== Film ===
Film roles
Year	Title	Role	Notes
2004	Unstoppable	Holly	
2015	A Burial Hymn	Meaghan	Short film
2019	Cupcake	Mrs. Nealon	Short film
2020	Bad Boys for Life	Reporter	Uncredited appearance
2020	Transference	Camille	
2021	Horror Noire	Ashley	
2022	Labor, Lies and Murder	Jade	
2022	Vendetta	Jen Duncan	
2022	White Elephant	Tomi Lorenzo	
2022	Courtney Gets Possessed	Courtney Harper	
2022	A Jazzman's Blues	Margaret	
2022	The Lick	Jimmy	Short film
2023	Under His Influence	Lori	
2023	Cinnamon	Heather	
2024	The Neon Highway	Ginny's Mom	
2024	The Great Lillian Hall	Dunyasha	
2024	Freedom Hair	News Reporter	
2024	Tricked & Treated	Toprameneshia	
2026	Lone Star Bull	Kelly Coombes	

=== Television ===
Television roles
Year	Title	Role	Notes
2003	Star	Tallulah	7 episodes
2004	Shane	Audrey	Episode: "1.1"
2014	Your Worst Nightmare	Peggy Klinke	Episode: "No Escape"
2019	Raising Dion	Nurse	Episode: "Issue #107: Why So Vomity?"
2020	Tyler Perry's Young Dylan	Ms. Holt	Episode: "Speechless"
2020	The Oval	Nurse Linda	Episodes: "Clueless" and "Call of Duty"
2021	Brutal Bridesmaids	Holly	Television film
2021	Best Friends Forever	Lucy Hayden	Television film
2021	Secrets on Sorority Row	Stacey	Television film
2021	Dynasty	Michelle	Episode: "Your Sick and Self-Serving Vendetta"
2021	Queens	Dana Murphy	Episode: "1999"
2022	FBI	Mrs. Leone	Episode: "Flopped Cop"
2022	First Wives Club	Linda	Episode: "The Way You Do the Things You Do"
2023	Florida Man	Kaitlin Fox	7 episodes
2024	Sistas	News Reporter	3 episodes
2024	Bad Monkey	Heather	4 episodes
2025–present	Beyond the Gates	Vanessa McBride	Series regular
2026	Not My Family: The Monique Smith Story	Trinity	Television film
2026	His & Hers	Jeannine	Episode: "1.1"
