= Madonna of the Streets (1930 film) =

1930 film

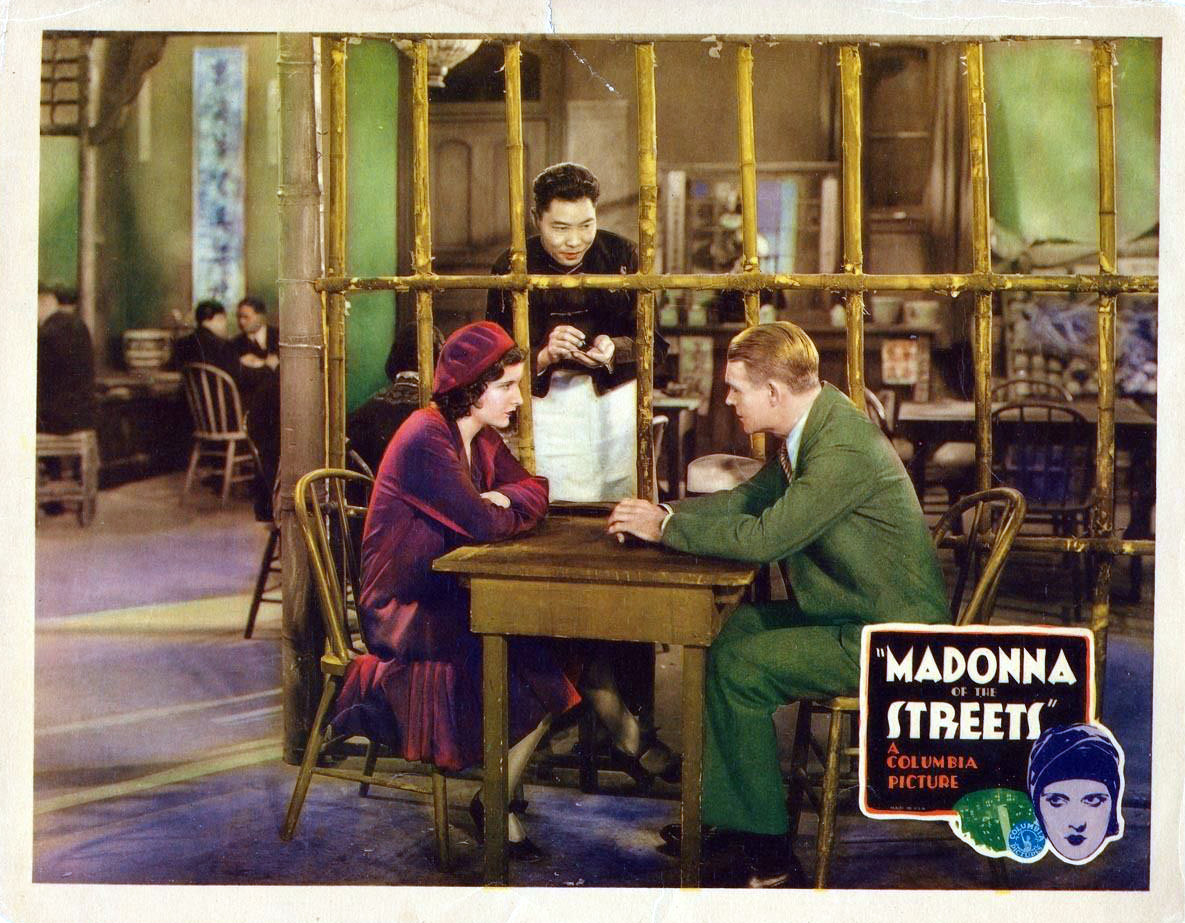
- Lobby card
- Directed by: John S. Robertson
- Written by: Jo Swerling
- Based on: The Ragged Messenger by William Babington Maxwell
- Produced by: Harry Cohn
- Starring: Evelyn Brent
- Cinematography: Sol Polito
- Edited by: Gene Havlick
- Distributed by: Columbia Pictures
- Release date: November 25, 1930
- Running time: 72 minutes
- Country: United States
- Language: English

Madonna of the Streets is a 1930 American Pre-Code drama film directed by John S. Robertson and starring Evelyn Brent. The film is a sound remake of the 1924 silent film Madonna of the Streets starring Alla Nazimova. A copy of the film is preserved in the Library of Congress collection.

== Cast ==
- Evelyn Brent as May
- Robert Ames as Morton
- Ivan Linow as Slumguillion
- Josephine Dunn as Marion
- Edwards Davis as Clark
- Zack Williams as Blink
- Richard Tucker as Kingsley
- Ed Brady as Ramsey
