= Vendetta (2022 film) =

2022 American film by Jared Cohn

- Theatrical release poster
- Directed by: Jared Cohn
- Written by: Jared Cohn
- Produced by: Amar Balaggan; Benjamin Rappaport; Ross Mrazek; Corey William Large
- Starring: Clive Standen; Theo Rossi; Mike Tyson; Thomas Jane; Bruce Willis
- Cinematography: Brandon Cox
- Edited by: Trevor Mirosh
- Music by: David Findlay
- Production companies: B.A.R. None Productions; 308 Enterprises; Vector Film Services; Media Capital Group; T.N.G. Capital Corp.
- Distributed by: Redbox Entertainment; Vertical Entertainment
- Release date: May 17, 2022
- Running time: 96 minutes
- Country: United States
- Language: English
- Box office: $175,173

Vendetta is a 2022 American action-thriller revenge film written and directed by Jared Cohn and starring Clive Standen, Theo Rossi, Mike Tyson, Thomas Jane, and Bruce Willis.

The film was released in limited theaters and on-demand platforms on May 17, 2022, by Redbox Entertainment and Vertical Entertainment.

== Plot ==
In suburban Georgia, family man William Duncan picks up his daughter Kat, a softball player with dreams of playing professionally. On their way to pick up dinner, Kat assures him that while she focuses on her sports, she will also study to become a lawyer. While William goes inside to order the food, Kat is left in the car. Brothers Rory and Danny, working for their father, kingpin Donnie turn up and drag her outside despite her pleas, with Rory informing her they only want her soul before Danny shoots and kills her. Danny is soon arrested by the authorities, but William is told Danny will likely only get 5–7 years in prison. Believing Danny deserves a stronger punishment, William intentionally doesn't identify Danny, allowing him to go free. The following night, William later stalks and hits Danny with his car, then proceeds to beat Danny to death with a softball bat. Returning home, he cleans his car and the bat and disposes of the bloody garments, later noticing and washing blood off his shirt, breaking down at the horror of what he's done.

Rory is informed of Danny's death and rushes to the scene but is told the investigation is ongoing. Detective Chen, the investigating detective finds out who Danny is and pays William a visit, informing him of Danny's murder and asking where he was that night, to which William states he was at home, and asks if he's a suspect. Chen says he's not but asks that he call if he thinks of anything. William's wife Jen confronts him and asks him where he was that night and begs him not to go back to his old ways, revealing that William was a former Marine. Rory questions a prostitute who tried to solicit William in the place where Danny was killed, and after confirming William's identity from a photo, Rory and his henchman ambush William the following day at a coffee shop. William manages to kill the henchman but loses his wallet which is picked up by Rory. Rushing home, William calls Chen and tells him the truth, and Chen leaves a squad car for his protection. William confesses to Jen what he has done, and she suggests they run away, but are ambushed by Rory and Donnie, who shoot him and Jen, killing her and leaving William to die.

William wakes up in the hospital, intent on revenge. Chen visits him and gives him a file on Donnie and Rory. After recuperating, William escapes from the hospital in a janitor outfit and gets a change of clothes and a motel to stay in as well as money from the bank. Upon returning to the motel, William is accosted by a man named Dante, who reveals his knowledge of William from the court case and offers him firearms, revealing himself to be an arms dealer who lost his cousin to Donnie. After telling Dante of his past, William buys firearms and moves to a secluded location where he trains himself. Once done William comes back into town and seeks out one of Rory's henchmen, forcing him to reveal Donnie's location before shooting him dead. Upon learning of his henchman's death, Donnie orders Rory to kill William once and for all. Rory and his gang set out to find William, but William having already been at the club, sneaks inside and confronts Donnie. He tells Donnie that he has become emotionless to all that he has experienced, and that killing is normal for him now before shooting Donnie dead. He uses Donnie's phone to call Rory and inform him about his father's death. Upon reaching the club and seeing his father's body, Rory doesn't react as he hates his father due to Donnie constantly mentioning that Danny was better than him but orders his gang to find and kill William. William ambushes the gang but escapes to the motel, where the prostitute that identified him earlier tips off Rory. Dante learns of the ambush and helps William remove a bullet lodged in him, but Rory shows up at the motel and calls out to William. William opens fire on the gang and he and Dante escape with Rory in pursuit. Dante calls his friend Roach, who sets up an ambush for Rory and drives them away. Knowing they will be back, Dante, Roach and his gang prepare for the ambush, during which all gang members from both sides are killed, and Rory kills Roach, leaving him and William. Rory shoots William in the stomach and gloats over him, allowing William to grab a screwdriver and stab Rory in the neck. As he watches Rory die, Rory sees the pain that he caused by destroying his family. But knowing that William finally got his revenge, knowing there is nothing he can do now that he slowly dies, as he's smiling with insult, showing the face he wants William to never forget as he finally dies. Dante, having survived the assault, escapes upon hearing police sirens. Chen meets William and has a chat with him before William succumbs to his injuries as he dies. William finally avenges his family by not only killing the notorious Fetter family and their gang, but destroying their community, putting an end to their crimes once and for all, but at the cost of his own life. After William's death Chen states that he hopes it was worth it. At the end, the message says, ("To exact revenge for yourself is not only right, it's an absolute duty") written by Stieg Larsson.

== Cast ==
- Clive Standen as William Duncan
- Theo Rossi as Rory Fetter
- Mike Tyson as Roach
- Thomas Jane as Dante
- Bruce Willis as Donnie Fetter
- Cabot Basden as Danny Fetter
- Kurt Yue as Detective Chen
- Lauren Buglioli as Jen Duncan
- Maddie Nichols as Kat Duncan
- Derek Russo as Zach
- Caia Coley as Nurse Pam

== Production ==
Filming wrapped in September 2021.

That same month, Redbox Entertainment announced it had acquired American distribution rights to the film. Vendetta is one of the last films to star Willis, who retired from acting because he was diagnosed with frontotemporal dementia.

== Release ==
Vendetta was released in limited theaters and on-demand platforms on May 17, 2022, by Redbox Entertainment.

== Reception ==
=== Box office ===
As of February 17, 2023, Vendetta grossed $175,173 in the United Arab Emirates, Russia, and South Korea.

=== Critical response ===
Rene Rodriguez of Variety gave a negative review, saying, "the body count starts to mount. So do the implausibilities, along with the boredom." Brian Costello of Common Sense Media also gave a negative review, saying, "when the most earnest and compelling performance in a movie is turned in by Sir Mike Tyson, you know you're in trouble."
