= Shane (British TV series) =

ITV sitcom written by and starring Frank Skinner

- Created by: Frank Skinner
- Starring: Frank Skinner; Elizabeth Berrington; David Schneider
- Country of origin: United Kingdom
- No. of series: 1
- No. of episodes: 7

Production
- Producer: Avalon Productions
- Running time: 30 minutes

Original release
- Network: ITV
- Release: 21 April – 19 May 2004

Shane is an ITV sitcom written by and starring Frank Skinner and directed by Audrey Cooke, with the first series originally broadcast in 2004. Reviews were generally poor, but a second series was commissioned. After the second series had been recorded, contract differences between Frank Skinner and ITV arose; the second series, consisting a further six episodes has never been broadcast despite being finished and edited.

An American version of the show was piloted by CBS, with Skinner working as executive producer.

== Plot ==
The show was about the title character, Shane (Skinner), a middle aged taxi driver, and his long suffering family. His wife, Myrtle, is a mature student who enjoys creative writing and amateur dramatics. Their children are daughter Velma, a seventeen-year-old feminist, and son Lenny, a pre-pubescent child who, much to Myrtle's disappointment, shows signs of developing a similar sense of humour to Shane.

Shane's best friend and boss is Bazza, with whom he spends much time down the pub. The barmaid at the pub is Sheila, whom Shane has a keen interest in.

== Cast ==
=== Regular cast ===
- Frank Skinner - Shane
- Elizabeth Berrington - Myrtle
- Kelly Scott - Velma
- Tony Bignell - Lenny
- David Schneider - Bazza
- Carli Norris - Sheila

=== Guest cast ===
- Will Ashcroft - History teacher
- Lauren Buglioli - Audrey
- Harry Burton - Clive
- Robert Cameron - English teacher
- Richard Clues - Man with bird
- Angela Curren - Compère
- Simon Day - Suicidal Man
- Edna Dore - Great-gran
- Fiona Gillies - Violet
- Gerald Home - Crocodile
- Seeta Indrani - Fiancée
- Rosalind Knight - Gran
- Lily Lovett - Amelia
- Tanya Moody - Drama teacher
- Simon Slater - Gordon
- Leon Garner - Sam
- Matthew Thomas - Spotty kid
- Glenn Wrage - Vet
