= Daisy Bufford =

American actress (1913–1987)

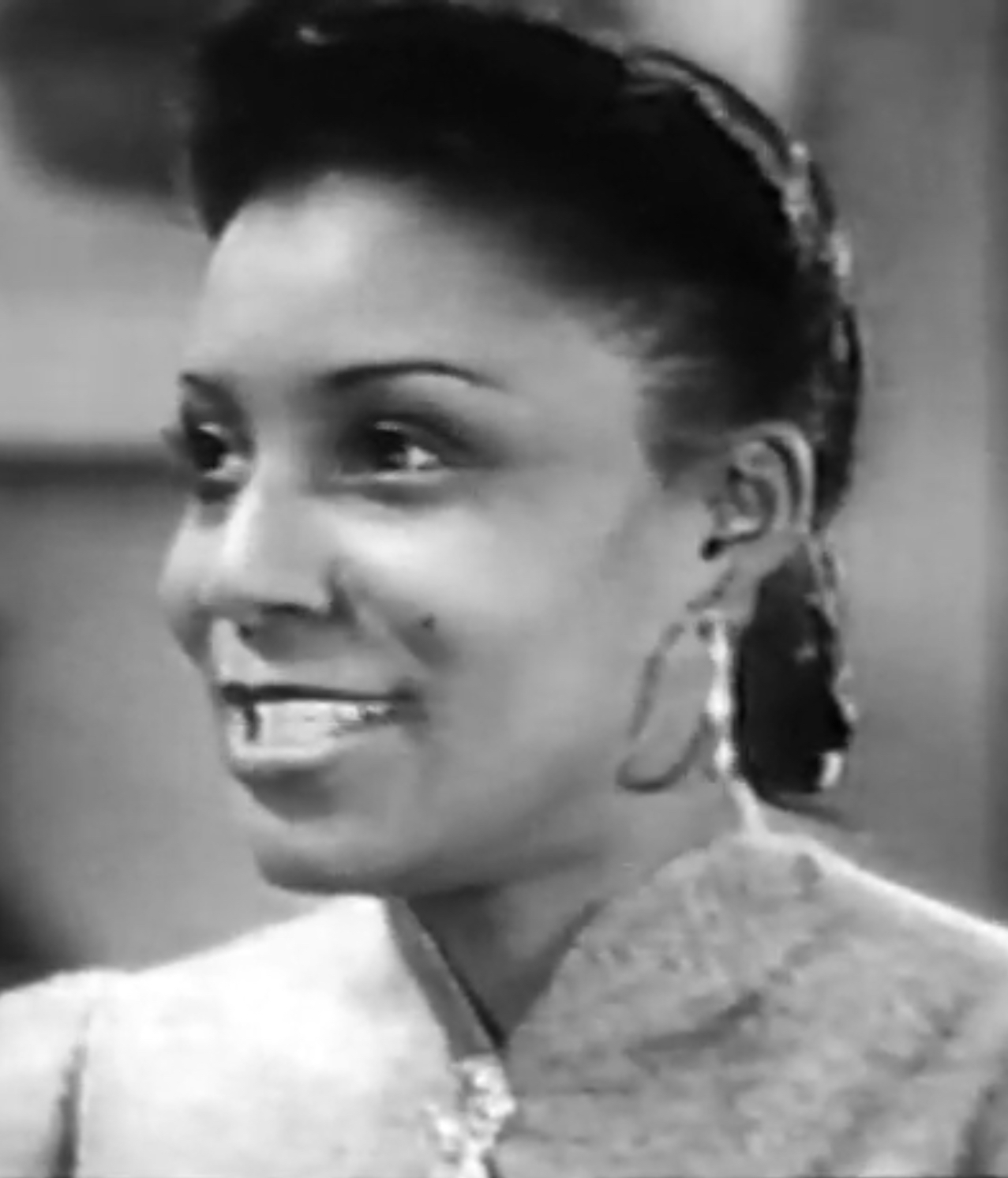
- Bufford in Son of Ingagi (1940)
- Born: April 20, 1913; Franklin, Louisiana, U.S.
- Died: December 18, 1987 (aged 74); Contra Costa County, California, U.S.
- Occupations: Actress, model
- Years active: 1925–1943

Daisy Bufford (April 20, 1913 – December 18, 1987) was an American film actress and model. She was one of the few African-American women to transition from silent films to sound cinema and is best remembered for her starring role as Eleanor Lindsay in Son of Ingagi (1940), the first science fiction horror film featuring an all-Black cast.

Despite systemic racial barriers in the film industry, Bufford maintained a steady career through the 1920s to the 1940s, appearing in both mainstream studio pictures and African-American "race films." She was frequently praised in the Black press for her beauty, discipline, and professionalism, and was considered a trailblazer among Black actresses in early Hollywood.

== Early life ==
Daisy Bufford was born on April 20, 1913, in Franklin, Louisiana. She began her film career during the silent era, reportedly around 1925. She became known as the only African-American bathing beauty working for producer Mack Sennett, appearing in short films including Midnight Rose (1927) alongside European star Lya de Putti.

She also performed in stage productions, including a 17-week run in the play Alias the Deacon, which was later adapted to film. Bufford began appearing in sound films in the 1930s, often in supporting or uncredited roles. Her appearances included films such as Stranded, Don't Bet on Blondes (1935), and Diamond Jim Brady (1935).

== Career ==
In the 1930s, Bufford gained recognition for her work in both mainstream and race films. In addition to acting, she worked as a fashion model and appeared regularly in the Los Angeles Black social scene. She was a frequent subject of entertainment columns and hosted parties attended by prominent figures, including Louis Armstrong.

Bufford's most memorable role came in 1940 when she starred as Eleanor Lindsay in Son of Ingagi, the first sci-fi horror film featuring an all-Black cast. The film, written by Spencer Williams Jr., told the story of a newlywed couple terrorized by a monstrous creature. Bufford's performance was lauded in the Black press for its strength, emotion, and physical bravery.

She later appeared in the MGM musical Broadway Rhythm (1943), which featured other African-American stars such as Lena Horne and Hazel Scott.

== Personal life ==
Bufford was known for her active lifestyle and dedication to fitness. Reports noted that she maintained a strict diet and played tennis frequently.

In 1933, she spent ten weeks recovering from a broken leg but returned to film shortly afterward. She lived in Los Angeles with her mother and was a beloved figure among the Black film and arts community of the West Coast.

== Death ==
Daisy Bufford died on December 18, 1987, in Contra Costa County, California, at the age of 74.

== Filmography ==
| Year | Title | Role | Notes |
|---|---|---|---|
| 1927 | The Girl from Everywhere | Minor Role | Uncredited |
| 1934 | Cleopatra | Dancer / Slave Girl | Uncredited |
| 1934 | Imitation of Life | Black Waitress | Uncredited |
| 1935 | A Notorious Gentleman | Waitress | Uncredited |
| 1935 | Don't Bet on Blondes | Penny – Marilyn's Maid | Uncredited |
| 1935 | Diamond Jim | Maid | Uncredited |
| 1935 | The Invisable Ray | Infant's Mother | Uncredited |
| 1936 | Next Time We Love | Maid | Uncredited |
| 1936 | Show Boat | Maid in Chicago | Uncredited |
| 1936 | Forgotten Faces | Maid | |
| 1936 | To Mary – with Love | Maid | |
| 1936 | Star for a Night | Maid | Uncredited |
| 1937 | Nobody's Baby | Black Woman in Taxi | Uncredited |
| 1937 | The Toast of New York | Heather – Josie's Maid | Uncredited |
| 1937 | Sophie Lang Goes West | Maid | |
| 1937 | Something to Sing About | Daisy – Stephanie's Maid | Uncredited |
| 1937 | The Adventurous Blonde | Daisy | Uncredited |
| 1937 | Love on Toast | Hyacinth | |
| 1937 | Deep South | Actress | Short film |
| 1938 | Jezebel | Flower Girl | Uncredited |
| 1939 | Naughty but Nice | Maid | Uncredited |
| 1939 | The Star Maker | Colored Maid | Uncredited |
| 1939 | Gone with the Wind | Housemaid at Evening Prayers | Uncredited |
| 1940 | Son of Ingagi | Eleanor Lindsay | Lead role |
| 1940 | Two Girls on Broadway | Nightclub Powder Room Attendant | Uncredited |
| 1942 | Lady Gangster | Black Prisoner | Uncredited |
| 1943 | Cabin in the Sky | Dancer / Jim Henry's Paradise Patron | Uncredited |
| 1943 | Hers to Hold | Defense Plant Worker | Uncredited |
| 1944 | Jam Session | Woman Armstrong Sings To | Uncredited |
| 1944 | Charlie Chan in the Chinese Cat | Carolina | Uncredited |
