= Court Martial (1928 film) =

1928 film by George B. Seitz

Court-Martial
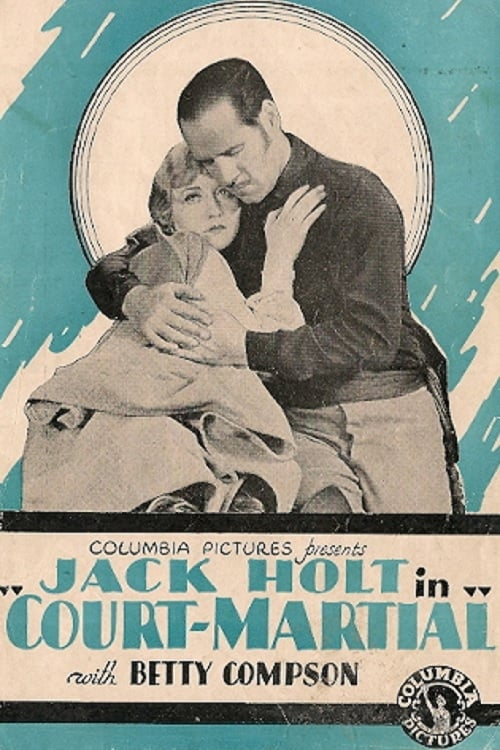
- Directed by: George B. Seitz
- Written by: Elmer Blaney Harris (story); Anthony Coldeway (scenario); Mort Blumenstock (titles)
- Produced by: Harry Cohn
- Starring: Jack Holt; Betty Compson
- Cinematography: Joseph Walker
- Edited by: Arthur Roberts
- Distributed by: Columbia Pictures
- Release date: August 12, 1928
- Running time: 65 minutes
- Country: United States
- Language: Silent (English intertitles)

Court Martial is a 1928 American silent war drama film directed by George B. Seitz, starring Jack Holt, Betty Compson as Belle Starr, and Frank Austin as Abraham Lincoln, and released by Columbia Pictures.

== Cast ==
- Jack Holt as James Camden
- Betty Compson as Belle Starr
- Pat Harmon as Bull
- Doris Hill as General's Daughter
- Frank Lackteen as 'Devil' Dawson
- Frank Austin as President Abraham Lincoln
- George Cowl as General Robert Hackathorne
- Zack Williams as Negro

== Preservation ==
Court Martial is considered completely extant with 35mm prints held by the Museum of Modern Art, Cineteca del Friuli in Gemona, and the National Archives of Canada. A 16mm print is also held by the Library of Congress.

The foreign release print of the film MOMA's collection was shown at the annual Cinecon Classic Film Festival in 2014.

Publicity for the film stated that several sequences were shot in early Technicolor, but these do not appear to have survived.

== See also ==
- List of early color feature films
- List of films and television shows about the American Civil War
