= White Elephant (2022 film) =

2022 American film by Jesse V. Johnson

- Theatrical release poster
- Directed by: Jesse V. Johnson
- Screenplay by: Jesse V. Johnson; Erik Martinez
- Story by: Jesse V. Johnson
- Produced by: Corey Large
- Starring: Michael Rooker; Bruce Willis; Olga Kurylenko; John Malkovich
- Cinematography: Jonathan Hall
- Edited by: Matthew Lorentz
- Music by: Sean Murray
- Production company: 308 Ent
- Distributed by: RLJE Films; AMC+
- Release date: June 3, 2022
- Running time: 92 minutes
- Country: United States
- Language: English
- Box office: $49,477

White Elephant is an American action film directed by Jesse V. Johnson and written by Johnson and Erik Martinez, based on a story by Johnson. It stars Michael Rooker, Bruce Willis, Olga Kurylenko, and John Malkovich.

It was released in the United States by RLJE Films and AMC+ on June 3, 2022.

== Premise ==
Gabriel Tancredi, a former Marine turned mob enforcer, breaks his code of conduct to save a police officer, Vanessa, who witnessed a failed assassination attempt ordered by Arnold Solomon, his friend and ruthless mob boss.

== Cast ==
- Michael Rooker as Gabriel Tancredi
- Bruce Willis as Arnold Solomon
- Olga Kurylenko as Vanessa Flynn
- John Malkovich as Glen Follett
- Vadhir Derbez as Carlos Garcia
- Josef Cannon as Jim
- Lauren Buglioli as Tomi
- Lorenzo Antonucci as K.I.M
- Louie Ski Carr as Luis Velasquez
- Michael Rose as Walter Koschek
- Chris Cleveland as Daley

== Production ==
The film was shot in the state of Georgia, beginning in April 2021. White Elephant is one of the last films to star Bruce Willis, who retired from acting because he was diagnosed with frontotemporal dementia. Director Jesse V. Johnson, who previously worked with Willis when he himself was a stuntman, told the Los Angeles Times that "it was clear that he was not the Bruce I remembered". Willis's lines were filmed at a quicker pace at the suggestion of his assistant, Stephen J. Eads. Several crew members recalled Willis appearing confused on set. One of the crew members said, "It was less of an annoyance and more like: 'How do we not make Bruce look bad?'. Someone would give him a line and he didn't understand what it meant. He was just being puppeted." Production supervisor Terri Martin said, "He just looked so lost, and he would say, 'I'll do my best.' He always tried his best." Johnson would later be asked if he wanted to film another movie with Willis but the director declined the offer, stating, "it was decided as a team that we would not do another. We are all Bruce Willis fans, and the arrangement felt wrong and ultimately a rather sad end to an incredible career, one that none of us felt comfortable with."

== Release ==
The film was released in select theaters in the United States by RLJE Films and on streaming on AMC+ on June 3, 2022.

=== Box office ===
As of May 26, 2023, White Elephant grossed $49,477 in the United Arab Emirates, Russia, and Portugal.

=== Critical response ===
On the review aggregator website Rotten Tomatoes, 25% of 8 critics' reviews are positive, with an average rating of 4.4/10.

Roger Moore of Movie Nation gave a negative review and wrote, "judging from the inane script, the unhurried direction...and by the destruction wrought when machine guns tear up cars, houses and people (nothing graphic enough to be honest), it's obvious that the budget here went to actors and ordnance." Dom Sinacola of Paste also gave a negative review, summarizing the film was "like the work of an artist still searching for inspiration."

Tae Kwon Do Life Magazine praised Michael Rooker's performance in the film, "This is his best performance, by far. He is very memorable in this role."
