= Son of Ingagi =

1940 film by Richard C. Kahn

- Directed by: Richard C. Kahn
- Written by: Spencer Williams
- Produced by: Richard C. Kahn
- Starring: Zack Williams; Spencer Williams
- Cinematography: Roland Price; Spencer Williams; Herman Schopp; Laura Bowman
- Edited by: Dan Milner
- Distributed by: Sack Amusement Enterprises
- Release dates: February 14, 1940 (Warfield Theater, Detroit)
- Running time: 70 minutes
- Country: United States
- Language: English

Son of Ingagi is a 1940 American film directed by Richard C. Kahn. It was the first science fiction horror film to feature an all-black cast. It was written by Spencer Williams based on his own short story, House of Horror. Although the film's title appears to suggest that it is a sequel to the 1930 movie Ingagi, it is not. (The latter is an exploitation film in the guise of an ethnographic film in which purported African women are given over to gorillas as sex slaves.)

Son of Ingagi is about Elanor and Bob Lindsay inheriting the house of doctor Helen Jackson who had just returned from her trip to Africa. Jackson also had returned with a missing link monster named N'Gina as well as African gold. When N'Gina drinks the doctor's potion, it puts him into a rage that makes him murder Dr. Jackson. The Lindsay family inherits Jackson's house where they soon find the presence of the monster.

== Plot ==
After the wedding of Eleanor and Bob Lindsay, a doctor named Helen Jackson had a discussion with Detective Nelson (Spencer Williams) and Jackson's attorney asking them to come over to her place so she can change her will. While Dr. Jackson works in her office she is approached by her brother Zeno, who insists that on Jackson's visits to Africa she must have taken gold and hidden it in her office. In response, Dr.Jackson hits a gong which calls upon the monster N'Gina, a missing link monster who she has taken from her previous trip to Africa. Jackson's brother leaves terrified. At the Lindsay's wedding, an explosion erupts, which leads most party-goers to investigate with only Eleanor staying at home. Eleanor is then visited by Dr.Jackson, who explains that she was in love with Eleanor's father and that she had fled to Africa later after he married Eleanor's mother.

Later in her laboratory, Jackson works on a potion for the benefit of human race. N'Gina takes the potion and drinks it which causes N'Gina to go on a rampage which kills Jackson. The Lindsays later find that they are beneficiaries in Helen's will, and due to her sudden death they are initially suspected of murdering her. Later, the Lindsays are acquitted of the crime, and move into Helen's manor.

Eleanor soon discovers that food is mysteriously disappearing. Bradshaw, the executor of the will, comes to urge them to sell the house, and while rummaging through the desk, he carelessly rings the gong, which summons N'Gina from the hiding place in the cellar. N'Gina reacts to the stranger and kills Bradshaw. Detective Nelson is assigned to solve the mystery of the house and moves into the home. Zeno breaks into the couple's bedroom, but escapes when Eleanor accidentally hits Bob instead of Zeno.

After seeing N'Gina emerge from the basement, Zeno follows N'Gina's path to seize Helen's gold. Zeno finds the gold but is caught by N'Gina who drags Zeno upstairs for Nelson to find. Eleanor spots N'Gina and faints at the sight the creature. N'Gina then carries Eleanor downstairs. When Nelson finds Zeno's body he awakens Bob who searches for Eleanor. N'Gina accidentally starts a fire, and Eleanor's screams draw Bob and Nelson into the basement where Nelson fails to arrest N'Gina. Bob, however, succeeds in locking the beast in a cell while the house and N'Gina burn. Nelson emerges from the bushes outside with the bags of gold while Bob and Eleanor escape unharmed.

== Cast ==
- Zack Williams as N'Gina
- Laura Bowman as Dr. Jackson
- Alfred Grant as Robert Lindsay
- Daisy Bufford as Eleanor Lindsay
- Arthur Ray as Zeno Jackson
- Spencer Williams as Nelson
- Earl J. Morris as Bradshaw
- Jesse Graves as Chief of Detectives
- The Toppers as themselves

== Production ==
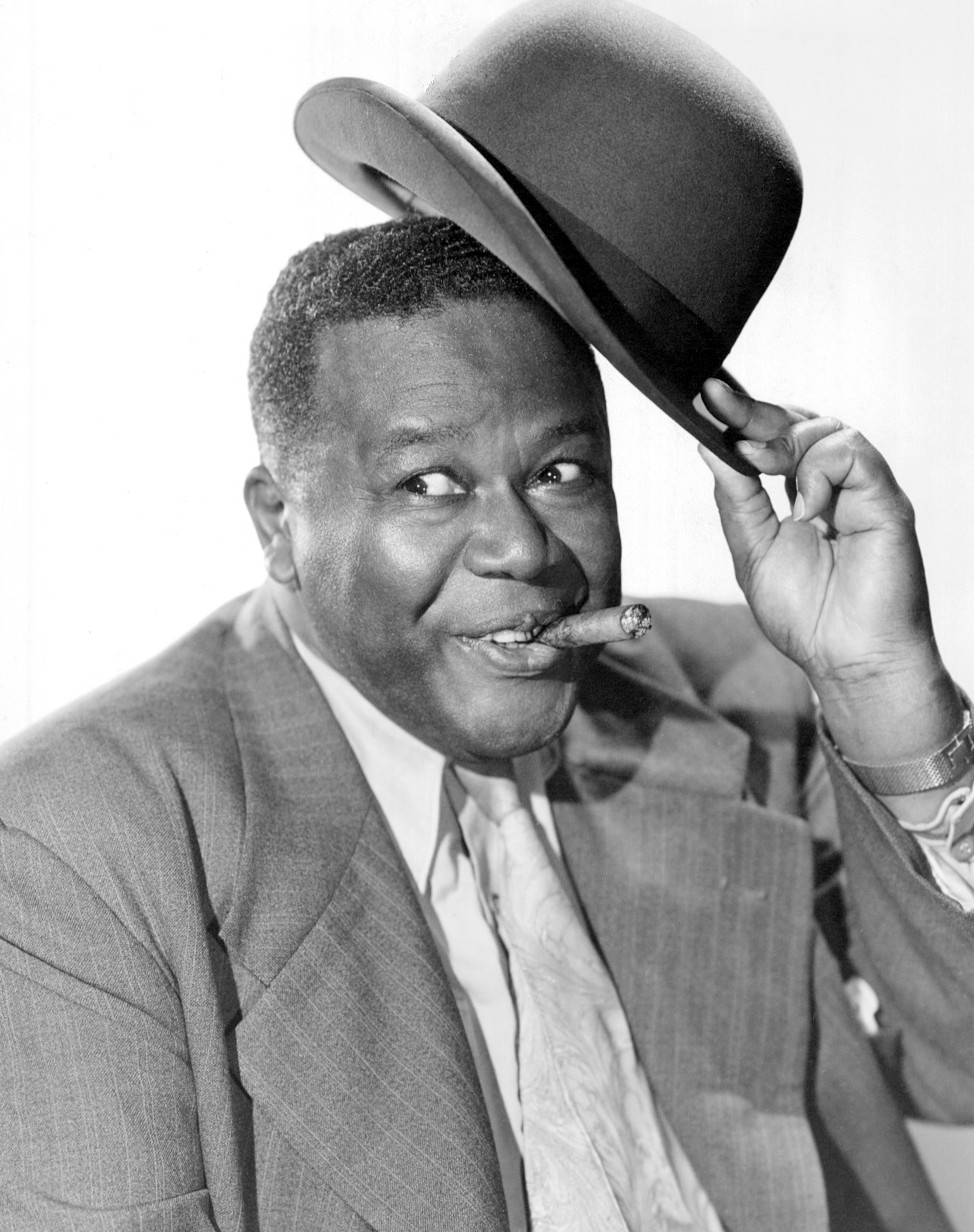
Spencer Williams wrote the script for Son of Ingagi.

Spencer Williams' screenplay for Son of Ingagi was based on his own story titled House of Horror. Alfred N. Sack, whose Dallas, Texas-based company Sack Amusement Enterprises produced and distributed race films, was impressed with Spencer Williams' screenplay for Son of Ingagi and offered him the opportunity to write and direct a feature film. William's resulting film was The Blood of Jesus (1941) while Son of Ingagi was directed by the white American director Richard Kahn. At that time, the only African American filmmaker was the self-financed Oscar Micheaux.

Cynthia Erb, author of Tracking King Kong: A Hollywood Icon in World Culture suggests that the reason the film's monster does not match the title in the film was possibly for box office reasons, as to have it relate to the popular success of the exploitation film Ingagi (1930). Both Richard Gilliam of Allmovie and Erb note that N'Gina was probably influenced by Boris Karloff's character in Frankenstein with N'Gina's outbursts of violence and tendency to show emotions of suffering and being mournful.

== Release and reception ==
Son of Ingagi was screened in Detroit, Michigan on February 14, 1940 at the Warfield Theater, a 376-seat African-American theater.

Gilliam of the online film database AllMovie wrote that the film was "One of the more interesting low-budget films of the early '40s" and "Despite what its low-budget origin and lurid subject matter might indicate, Son of Ingagi is both well-written and well-acted. It's no undiscovered classic, but it's also not the bottom-of-the-barrel trash that some references sources claim that it is."

== See also ==
- Black horror
- List of horror films of the 1940s

== Sources ==
- Balio, Tino (1996). Grand design: Hollywood as a modern business enterprise, 1930-1939. University of California Press. ISBN 0-520-20334-8.
- Corliss, Richard (May 13, 2002). "Black Cinema: Micheaux Must Go On". Time Magazine. Archived from the original on October 20, 2010.
- Erb, Cynthia Marie (2009). Tracking King Kong: A Hollywood Icon in World Culture. Wayne State University Press. ISBN 978-0-8143-3430-0.
- Gilliam, Richard. "Allmovie: Review:Son of Ingagi". AllMovie. Archived from the original on April 29, 2014.
- Moon, Spencer (1997). Reel Black talk: a sourcebook of 50 American filmmakers. Greenwood Publishing Group. ISBN 0-313-29830-0.
- Smith, Eric Ledell (2015). African American Theater Buildings. McFarland & Company. ISBN 978-0-7864-4922-4.
- Weisenfeld, Judith (2007). Hollywood be thy name: African American religion in American film, 1929-1949. University of California Press. ISBN 978-0-520-22774-3.
