= Horror Noire: A History of Black Horror =

2019 American documentary film

- Promotional release poster
- Directed by: Xavier Burgin
- Written by: Ashlee Blackwell; Danielle Burrows
- Based on: Horror Noire: Blacks in American Horror Films from the 1890s to Present by Robin R. Means Coleman
- Produced by: Ashlee Blackwell; Danielle Burrows
- Starring: Keith David; Jordan Peele; Rachel True; Tony Todd; Tananarive Due; Robin R. Means Coleman; Ashlee Blackwell
- Cinematography: Mario Rodriguez
- Production company: Stage 3 Productions
- Distributed by: Shudder
- Release dates: February 1, 2019 (Grauman's Egyptian Theatre); February 7, 2019 (United States)
- Running time: 83 minutes
- Country: United States
- Language: English

Horror Noire: A History of Black Horror is a 2019 American documentary film directed by Xavier Burgin and based on the 2011 non-fiction book Horror Noire: Blacks in American Horror Films from the 1890s to Present by Robin R. Means Coleman. The film examines the evolution of the genre of black horror. It features interviews with Coleman, along with such figures as actors Keith David, Tony Todd, and Rachel True, director Jordan Peele, and author Tananarive Due.

Horror Noire was produced by Stage 3 Productions for Shudder, and premiered at Grauman's Egyptian Theatre in Hollywood, California, before being made available for streaming on Shudder. It received critical acclaim, with critics praising its informativeness, entertainment value, and variety of interview subjects in the fields of both filmmaking and academia.

== Synopsis ==
The documentary features interviews with a number of African-Americans with experience or expertise in horror films: Meosha Bean, Ashlee Blackwell, Robin R. Means Coleman, William Crain, Rusty Cundieff, Keith David, Loretta Devine, Ernest Dickerson, Tananarive Due, Ken Foree, Mark H. Harris, Richard Lawson, Tina Mabry, Kelly Jo Minter, Miguel A. Núñez Jr., Paula Jai Parker, Jordan Peele, Ken Sagoes, Monica Suriyage, Tony Todd, and Rachel True.

The 1915 film The Birth of a Nation, which portrayed African-Americans (many played by white actors in blackface) as sexually aggressive towards white women and the Ku Klux Klan as a righteous force, is discussed for its emboldening of racist depictions of black characters in later films. The minimal representation of black people in horror films released between the 1930s and 1950s is considered, with them often being relegated to roles as servants or background characters, or perhaps implied in the form of lustful monsters like King Kong and the prominently-lipped Gill-man. The 1968 film Night of the Living Dead, which features African-American actor Duane Jones as its protagonist, is highlighted for its portrayal of a heroic black character amid a turbulent decade marked by significant events in the civil rights movement.

The blaxploitation genre which emerged in the 1970s is explored. Blaxploitation films such as Blacula and Abby are discussed, along with the role of voodoo in films like Sugar Hill, and the production and themes of Ganja & Hess. The role of African-Americans in 1980s and 1990s horror films is examined, with attention being given to tokenism, the use of black characters as "sidekicks" for white leads, and tropes such as black characters being the first to die (it is noted that a large percentage do not die first, though they often die at some other point nonetheless), black characters sacrificing themselves to help save white characters, and the concept of the Magical Negro. The film Candyman is highlighted for its portrayal of the vengeful spirit of an African-American man, and the film Tales from the Hood is regarded for its depictions of racism, gang violence, and police brutality. Eve's Bayou, though not generally classified as a horror film, is also discussed, and Demon Knight is noted for featuring Jada Pinkett Smith as a black final girl. The intersection of horror films and hip-hop music is also covered.

Increased positive representation of African-Americans in 21st-century horror films is examined, with films like Attack the Block and The Girl with All the Gifts being mentioned. The 2017 film Get Out is discussed, with attention given to its black protagonist, its white antagonists, its themes, the state of American politics and the rise of the Black Lives Matter movement during the film's production, and the film's ending. The documentary concludes with its subjects holding that African-American-centered films have proved to be marketable and profitable, and hoping that positive African-American representation in horror films will continue in the future.

== Release ==
Horror Noire had its world premiere on February 1, 2019 at Grauman's Egyptian Theatre in Hollywood, California. On February 4, 2019, the film was shown on a double bill with Tales from the Hood at the Brooklyn Academy of Music. Horror Noire was made available for streaming on the streaming service Shudder on February 7, 2019.

=== TV series ===
AMC greenlit an anthology sequel spin-off TV series based on the film. It premiered on their horror streaming platform Shudder on October 28, 2021. The series later premiered on AMC on February 4, 2022 as part of Black History Month.

== Reception ==
=== Critical response ===
On review aggregator website Rotten Tomatoes, the film holds an approval rating of 100% based on 32 reviews, with an average rating of 8.8/10. The website's critical consensus reads: "Horror Noire: A History of Black Horror more than lives up to its title, offering a smart and entertaining overview of American film history through an overlooked lens."

Joe Lipsett of Bloody Disgusting wrote that "Horror Noire is always entertaining, but more importantly, it is an opportunity to acknowledge and advance the narrative about the contributions of Black talent in front and behind the camera", and suggests the documentary as "essential viewing for horror audiences". Similarly, Richard Newby of The Hollywood Reporter called the film "essential viewing for the genre fan. But more than that, for the black horror fan it's a historical document that charts our place in the genre". Jonathan Barkan of Dread Central called the film "always informative, and expertly crafted", as well as "a triumph of masterful execution, engaging storytelling, and brutal honesty." Noah Berlatsky of The Verge called the documentary "enlightening", and wrote that its "greatest strength may be the way it manages to embrace the viewpoints of scholars and fans at the same time." Bilge Ebiri of Vulture referred to it as "an excellent example of how to make cinema history accessible, informative, and even moving for a broader audience", and "an essential reclamation project."

Collider's Matt Goldberg gave the documentary a grade of "A", writing that it demonstrates that "the horror genre is perhaps most worthy of study because of how it shows us how black people are depicted in American popular cinema." Polygon's Jenna Stoeber also gave the film a positive review, calling it "a timely and engaging perspective on black representation in American cinema." Rathan Krueger of Consequence of Sound called the film "a fantastic history lesson", and wrote that it "crams a lot within its short time frame, but it's always entertaining". Kieran Fisher of Film School Rejects called it "powerful" and "an accessible, informative, and important addition to film discourse." Bob Chipman of The Escapist commended the film's structure and concluded that "if you've got even a little bit of interest in film history, especially if you like horror, it's definitely worth your time."

=== Accolades ===
| Year | Award | Category | Result | Ref(s) |
|---|---|---|---|---|
| 2019 | Detroit Film Critics Society Awards | Best Documentary | Nominated | |
| 2020 | Online Film Critics Society Awards | Best Non-Theatrical Releases | Won | |
| 2020 | Rondo Hatton Classic Horror Awards | Best Documentary | Won | |

== Podcast ==
Horror Noire: Uncut, a six-episode podcast featuring extended interviews from the Horror Noire documentary, premiered on Shudder on February 7, 2020.

== See also ==
- Racism in horror films
- History of horror films
