= The Big Split =

The Big Split is a 1999 romantic comedy independent film written, directed and produced by Martin Hynes, and starring Hynes and Judy Greer. The film won a Golden Trailer award in 2001 in the category "Best Trailer - No Budget".

Plot of the film:

"The Big Split" is a romantic comedy that follows Frank, a composer who works as a driving instructor to pay his bills, and Tracy, a New York-born documentary filmmaker learning to drive. Their unexpected connection leads to comedic and heartfelt moments as they navigate their personal and professional lives.
