= Race in horror films =

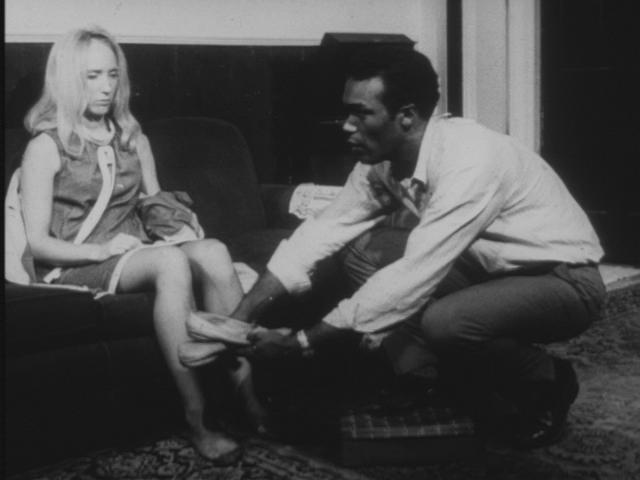
Judith O'Dea and Duane Jones in Night of the Living Dead (1968). The casting of a black actor in the lead role of an American film that did not explicitly explore ethnicity is often considered notable for its time.

Depictions of race in horror films have been the subject of commentary by fans and academics. Critics have discussed the representation of race in horror films in relation to the presence of racist ideas, stereotypes, and tropes within them. The horror genre has conversely also been used to explore social issues, including race, particularly following the popularization of social thrillers in the 2010s.

Throughout the history of the horror film genre, especially in American-produced horror films, racial minorities have not received as much representation as white people, often being relegated to lesser roles. For most of the 20th century, minorities were often subject to tokenism, being frequently cast as supporting characters or villains. The representation of race in horror films has undergone a significant transformation over the past century. Early examples, such as Son of Ingagi (1940), one of the first horror films to feature an all-Black cast, challenged the genre’s exclusionary norms and offered a rare space for Black storytelling. In the 1970s, films such as Blacula (1972) and Sugar Hill (1974) blended horror with Blaxploitation, presenting Black protagonists who subverted traditional monster tropes while reflecting the sociopolitical tensions of the era. The 1990s introduced more nuanced racial themes into mainstream horror, notably with Candyman (1992), which explored urban legends and racial trauma. These films laid the groundwork for the emergence of Black horror as a distinct subgenre, paving the way for contemporary works that center race as a core thematic element.-

== "The Brother Always Dies First" ==
"The Brother Always Dies First," coined by film critic Roger Ebert, references the popular misconception that black characters are the first victims in horror films. While it is not true that minority characters are always the first victims, black characters have a significantly high mortality rate in horror films. This includes minor, non-speaking, sometimes nameless roles that might not warrant death within the narrative. In an informal study of nearly one thousand horror movies with at least fifteen hundred appearances of black characters, scholar Robin R. Means Coleman and author Mark H. Harris found the mortality rate was around 45%.

In this, Jurassic Park (1993) may be the most remarkable example, killing off an unnamed Black guard within mere minutes.

This perceived phenomenon is satirized in the 2022 horror-comedy The Blackening, in which a group of black characters attempt to be the least-black to avoid death.

The consistent killing of black characters was, in part, popularized by a lack of significant roles in early horror films, making them easier to kill in comparison to their white counterparts. Black characters were relegated to the status of largely undeveloped expendable victims. For example, Mantan Moreland's unnamed character in Spider Baby (1967) is killed-off for shock and comedic effect.

Interestingly, one of the greatest of classic horror films, Night of the Living Dead (1968) defies this trend with the sole Black character being the last man standing. The film ends with the character dying not to zombies, but a gunshot to the head by authorities, and is then burned in a pile of corpses.

== Themes and plot devices ==
Much of the attention that minorities get within horror films is through the use of their culture as plot devices and structures to scare or trigger guilt among the white protagonists. References to such things as the "Indian burial ground" or the "medicine man" are commonly used in the horror genre to create a stereotype of "the other" and frighten white audiences. Many of the themes and plots relate to forcefully taking land from aboriginal peoples and the horrific outcomes that follow.

Horror films often rely on minority cultures and their signifiers being reduced to a mythical standpoint. The films do not portray these minority cultures sufficiently as an active part of the world or in the lives of the main characters. Instead, the cultures are cast as part of the mythological background of the evil that threatens the protagonist's life. American horror films have attacked the substance of both Native American and African American cultures, using them as devices and ultimately pinning them down as aspects of the past that are no longer a part of the current American culture. The "Indian burial ground" motif, heavily featured in horror film cycles of the 1970s and 1980s, is an example of how mainstream cinema renders Indigenous people as both hyper visible and invisible."

Native Americans are often hyper-visible in North American films [and] at the same time they [are] rendered invisible through plot lines that reinforce the trope of Indigenous people as vanishing or inconsequential. Native Americans stand at the center of the dominant culture's self-definition because Euro-American identity submerged and formed upon the textual and visual culture register of the Indigenous other.

Recently, horror films have started to tackle race in new ways. Movies like Jordan Peele’s Get Out (2017) and the Guatemalan film La Llorona (2019) use horror to explore racism and history from different perspectives.

=== Mythical negro ===
The "Mythical Negro" character is usually an older character who serves as an all-knowing aide to the main characters. The "Mythical Negro" usually informs the protagonists of the realities of the horror they face and guides them along the way. This character is set up to be sentimental and usually dies at some point, giving the main character more cause to defeat the evil. They act as an outlet for exposition, and their death is usually seen as necessary for the plot. Movies like The Shining show this trope, with the only black character, Dick Halloran (Scatman Crothers), being the one who understands the protagonist's true powers and the evil surrounding the plotline. However, in line with his trope, he dies in an attempt to rescue the protagonist from the antagonist.

=== Zombies ===
The concept of zombies has roots in slavery in Haiti. Zombies are seen as lifeless and live a life of constant despair, similar to the lives of slaves who were subjected to cruel environments and treatment, making them live a life of misery. Suicide was common during slavery, but it was believed that if you died your spirit would be released back to Africa, though if one were to take their own life, this would not be. Because of this, zombies were a metaphor for being trapped in ones' body until death as committing suicide would mean that your soul would not be released back to Ian guineé. However, a zombie might be more than a metaphor. In the early 1980s, ethnobotanist Wade Davis discovered zombification was a real punishment delivered by a bokor. This punishment is delivered in the form of a powerful toxin - a mixture of tetrodotoxin and Datura. After rubbing it onto the victim’s skin, the victim appears to be clinically dead, only to revive in the morgue (or their grave) days later. After recovering enough to walk, they live without a will and work as slaves in Haiti.

== Race as a theme ==
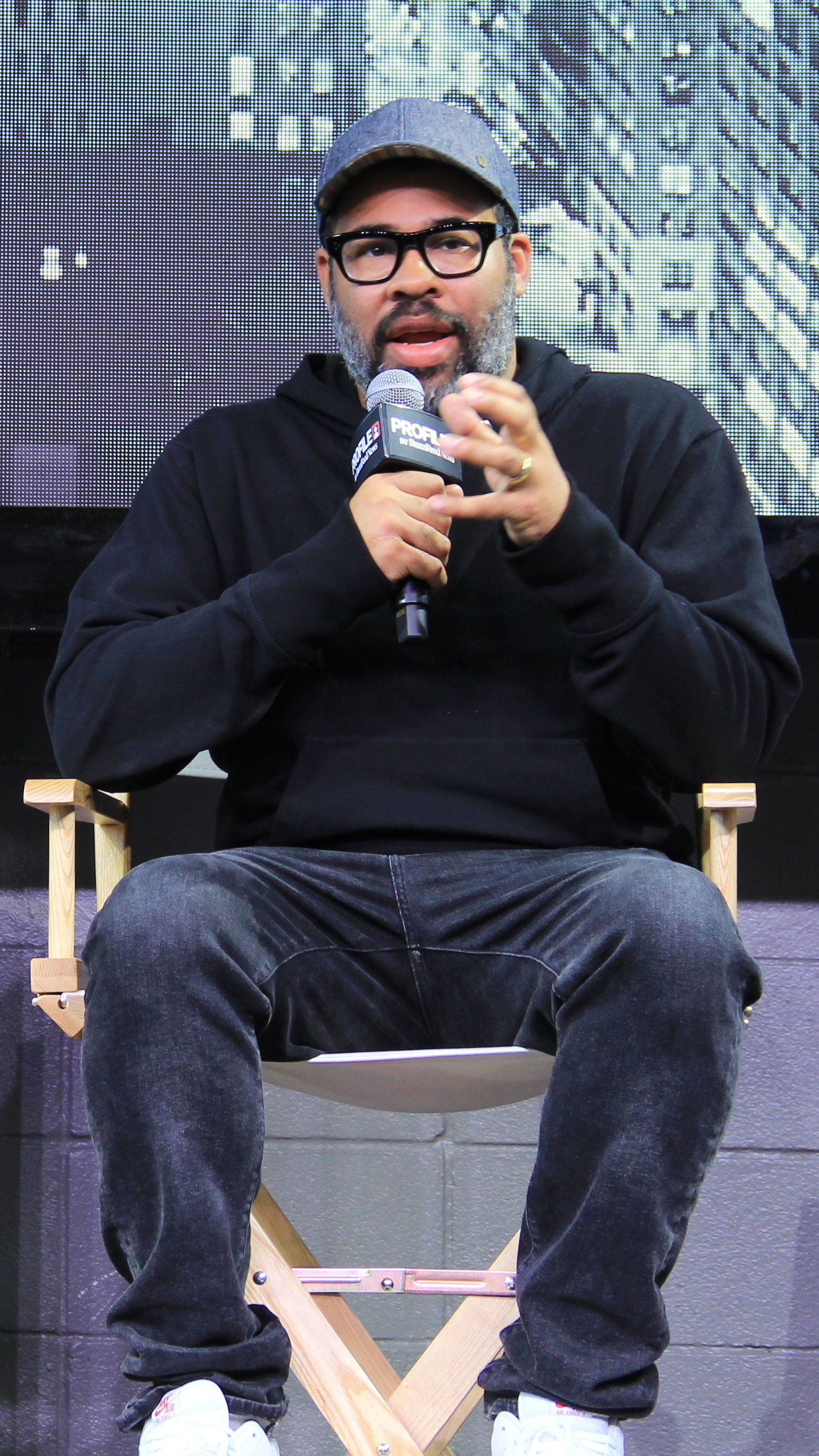
Director Jordan Peele's 2017 horror film Get Out received acclaim for its exploration of race in the United States.

There are a handful of directors attempting to address issues of race and sexuality, and the exploitative power that horror movies have. Many Native American and African American directors/screenwriters and actors have begun to use the horror genre to bring issues of racism and violence to audiences.

Director Ryan Coogler's film Sinners takes place in the Mississippi Delta in the Jim Crow South and highlights perspectives of Black, Indigenous, and Asian individuals during that time.

== Social commentary in horror ==
As we have seen develop in the 2010s, social commentary in horror has become deeply prevalent with the existence of Jordan Peele's filmography. It started in 2017 with his breakout film Get Out, which depicts a critique on modern racism with the notion that racism only exists in overt, right-wing forms; it shows how even ostensibly progressive, liberal white people can harbor deep-seated prejudices and engage in racist behaviors. In the film, the Armitage family's interest in Black people is not about true equality, but about a desire to possess their physical vitality, athletic prowess, and artistic talents, which they believe are superior to their own.

In 2019, Peele delivered another Black-forward social commentary in his film Us. However, this time he focused less on that of issues raised from racial biases, and more on an exploration of American privilege, class division, and the idea that the "monster" often lies within ourselves and our society. The film's Tethered, subterranean doppelgangers symbolize the forgotten and marginalized Americans whose suffering is overlooked by the privileged "halves" above. The story's central twist reveals that the protagonist, Adelaide, is actually a Tethered who switched places with her surface-dwelling counterpart, highlighting how privilege can be gained through the suffering of others and the way one's identity can be shaped by circumstance.

== See also ==
- Horror Noire: A History of Black Horror
- Blaxploitation horror films
- Indian burial ground trope
- Misogyny in horror films
- Disability in horror films
- Racism in early American film
