= Blaxploitation horror films =

Ethnic subgenre of horror film

Blaxploitation horror films are a genre of horror films involving mostly black actors. In 1972, William Crain directed what is considered to be the first blaxploitation horror film, Blacula.

== History ==
Blaxploitation films, regardless of subgenre, spawned from race movies. These were films that started appearing in the 1930s–1940s. They were meant to segregate films featuring an all black cast from mainstream Hollywood movies. Many of these films already had the element of horror integrated into them. Over time these films transcended into their own subgenre of film, blaxploitation horror films. In the 1950s to 1960s Hollywood started to integrate films produced and starring African Americans into mainstream media.

There was backlash by several African American directors and actors that did not want to be integrated into mainstream media. They wanted to stay independent which caused them to create more of what were originally known as race movies. This happened during the 1960s–70s which was during the time of the Civil Rights Movement.

African Americans were in fury at ongoing white oppression and wanted something that they could call their own. They began creating films that were directed, starring, and produced by African Americans. In an effort to maintain their cultural identity they made it a point to emphasize the stereotypes the white media was portraying them as. They called this genre blaxploitation. Many blaxploitation films have a mix of comedy and horror.

However, director William Crain took the aspect of horror in these films one step further and created the first blaxploitation horror film, Blacula. As a result, a new subgenre of blaxploitation was created, dedicated solely to horror.

== Background ==
Blaxploitation is a portmanteau of the words "black" and "exploitation". It makes a point to enforce stereotypes that have been afflicted on African Americans by the so-called white media. The first blaxploitation film was Sweet Sweetback's Baadasssss Song (1971). Melvin Van Peebles directed, produced, and took the hyper-sexualized lead role. He played a male prostitute who is out to fight "[the man]" (white oppression). It spanned a new type of film genre that evolved all the way to what is now the urban blaxploitation horror films of the 21st century.

== Blacula ==
Blacula, filmed in 1972, was the first ever blaxploitation horror film. The film was directed by William Crain and starred William Marshall, Vonetta McGee, and Denise Nicholas. The film was a parody of the popular film Dracula. In the film Blacula, played by William Marshall, an African prince named Mamuwalde is bitten by Count Dracula (Charles Macaulay) himself and is turned into a vampire. An interracial gay couple of interior decorators buy the coffin that Blacula has been in for the last 200 years (technically, 192 years as the prologue is set in 1780) and bring him back to their home in Los Angeles. Blacula has not fed in all that time as a result of Count Dracula's effort to punish him.

Once he freed from his coffin, Blacula goes loose on the streets of Los Angeles and becomes the black avenger. He terrorizes the city in his effort to quench his thirst for blood. While on his search to kill he meets a woman named Tina (Vonetta McGee) that looks just like his departed wife. He believes that she is the reincarnation of his wife and is bent on winning her affection by any means necessary. Tina's friend Gordon Thomas (Thalmus Rasulala) finds out that Blacula is a vampire and tries to kill him.

While Blacula can be viewed as a merely a cheesy parody of the film Dracula with an all black cast, it should also be noted for its portrayal of human sexuality and politics. Before becoming a vampire, Blacula was an African prince that wanted to connect Africa with the West. He tries to form this connection in an effort to stop the slave trade.

Since the first part of the film is set right before the 19th century it can be taken to mean that the slave trade they are referring to in the film was the North Atlantic slave trade. This gives insight into the way Africans viewed the slave trade. Blacula goes to Count Dracula to ask him to stop the slave trade. Unfortunately, Count Dracula likes the slave trade and wants to keep it in existence.

This can be viewed as to how Africans saw whites as oppressors that wanted to reap the benefits of the slave trade. Not only was Blacula brought to America by two interior decorators, but they were a gay interracial couple. This was very ground breaking at the time when racial prejudice and homophobia was running rampant at the time of the film's release.

Despite the controversies, the film Blacula went on to be named one of Variety's Top 50 Movies of 1972 and to win Best Horror Film of 1972 by the Academy of Horror Films and Science Fiction Films. Crain went on to film the sequel Scream Blacula Scream; although it was not as successful, it is still considered a notable horror film (see below).

== Stereotypical characters ==
- Spook - The spook is usually the comedic sidekick that is afraid of everything.
- Primitive - This character is from the rural parts of Africa. He partakes in African rituals and is bent on killing everyone.
- Mystical darkle - Like the old Magical Negro stereotype, the mystical darkle has some sort of magic powers that he or she uses to help or save the main character.
- Voodoo doer - This character is a hybrid between the primitive and the mystical darkle.
- Heroic death wisher - This character is usually a minor character that heroically dies to save the main character.
- Ghetto dweller - The ghetto dweller is similar to a modern-day spook. He tries to act cool and intimidating throughout the film only to cower in fear when things get too scary.
- Seductress - This femme fatale-inspired character tries to seduce the main character in an effort to distract him. Usually the seductress does not have sex with the main character. She just teases him.
- Authority figure - This character is placed in the film to promote a positive stereotype of African Americans. They tend not to have noticeable effect on the actions of the main character and are not that important in the overall story line.
- Brute - The brute rarely speaks but he tends to be very sexual, especially with white women.
- Voice of reason - This character is older than all the rest. Therefore, he has the most wisdom and should be listened to. He knows what is going to happen if the main characters do not heed his advice.
- Sidekick - This character is just along for the ride. He or she does not have any real defining characteristic. They usually just stick around with the main character and wait for their time to die.
- Rapper - This is a newer character that came about when blaxploitation horror films shifted to a more urban audience. His life span is based upon his popularity and fan base. His character tends to be similar to his rapper persona.
- Star - The star is the protagonist of the film and tends to live throughout the film. All the other characters listed above help this character achieve safety and play a role in guiding them throughout the movie.

== Notable films ==
Here is a list of what AMC considers to be the top blaxploitation horror films

- Blacula (1972)- directed by William Crain: African Prince is bitten by Dracula and reigns terror on Los Angeles
- Blackenstein (1973)- directed by William A. Levey, loosely based on Mary Shelley's 1818 novel Frankenstein; or, The Modern Prometheus
- Ganja and Hess (1973)- directed by Bill Gunn, archeologist is stabbed with a cursed dagger and becomes a vampire
- Scream Blacula Scream (1973)- directed by Bob Kelljan, the sequel to Blacula, a voodoo queen brings Blacula back to life
- Abby (1974)- directed by William Girdler, this film is a parody of The Exorcist, a minister's wife is possessed by a sex demon
- Sugar Hill (1974)- directed by Paul Maslansky, a zombie is called to seek revenge on the men who murdered Miss Sugar's boyfriend
- Dr. Black, Mr. Hyde (1976)- directed by William Crain, Dr. Henry Pride creates a serum that changes his skin tone and his personality
- J.D.'s Revenge (1976)- directed by Arthur Marks, a dead gangster takes over the body of a young law student in order to reveal who murdered him
- Petey Wheatstraw (1977)- directed by Cliff Roquemore, a murdered comedian is resurrected by Lucifer, after agreeing to marry his daughter
- Black Devil Doll from Hell (1984)- directed by Chester Novell Turner, a Christian woman has sex with a puppet
- Tales From the Hood (1995)- directed by Rusty Cundieff, three stories about ghost activities and an abusive step-dad
- Killjoy (2000)- directed by Craig Ross, a supernatural killer clown comes to avenge the death of a boy murdered by gangsters
- Bones (2001)- directed by Ernest R. Dickerson, Jimmy Bones comes back from the dead to avenge his murder (see below)
- Snoop Dogg's Hood of Horror (2006)- directed by Stacy Title, three stories of how Snoop Dogg becomes the Hound of Hell in an effort to bring his dead sister back to life.

== Notable actors and directors ==
- Noble Johnson (1881–1978) founded the first black film company.
- Kevin Peter Hall (1955–1991) played monsters in many horror films such as “227” and “Misfits of Science.”
- Tony Todd (1954–2024) star of Candyman.
- LL Cool J (1968–present) is not only a rapper but also starred in films such as Deep Blue Sea.
- Wes Craven (1939–2015) while Craven was white, he had been the director of black-featured horror films.
- Ken Foree (1946–present) appeared in many genre films throughout the 70s and 80s, is most notable for his role in Dawn of the Dead.
- Duane Jones (1936–1988) is known for starring in Night of the Living Dead.
- Pam Grier (1949–present) has starred in many blaxploitation horror films, most notably the Blacula sequel Scream Blacula Scream.
- William Marshall (1924–2003) starred in the first blaxploitation horror film, Blacula. He also starred in another notable blaxploitation horror film, Abby, which is a parody on the film The Exorcist.
- Rosalind Cash (1938–1995) was known for starring in another famous blaxploitation horror film, Dr. Black, Mr. Hyde.
- Scatman Crothers (1910–1986) was known for his infamous death scene in The Shining.
- Ernest Dickerson (1952–present) is known for directing blaxploitation horror films such as Bones and Demon Knight.
- Mantan Moreland (1901–1973) was a black comedian that was known for his roles in Meeting at Midnight and The Scarlet Clue.
- Full Moon Pictures is an urban horror film production studio that helped to keep the genre alive.
- Marlene Clark is an African American actress that made appearances in most blaxploitation horror films.
- Coolio (1963–2022) is an African American rapper that crossed over to acting. He has appeared in countless straight to video horror films.
- Willie Best (1913–1962) not only helped popularize the stereotype that African Americans were lazy, but he also starred in many horror films such as The Day Breakers.
- Charles S. Dutton (1951–present) is most notable for being the black man that dies in every horror movie he has starred in.
- Miguel A. Nunez, Jr. (1964–present) has been another black actor to depict dying in countless horror films.
- Creep FX is a horror division of urban films.
- William Crain (1949–present) is most notable for directing the first blaxploitation horror film, Blacula. In addition to Blacula he also directed Dr. Black, Mr. Hyde.
- Ernie Hudson (1945–present) is known for being the token black guy in many horror films.
- David Jean Thomas is known for starring in straight to video horror films such as Voodoo Moon.
- S. Torriano Berry (1958–present) is known for being one of the earliest directors of urban blaxploitation horror films such as The Embalmer.

== Social impact ==
Blaxploitation horror films are a way for African Americans to maintain a cultural identity that the white media have been trying to take away from them. Harry M. Benshoff, a professor of film at the University of North Texas, describes blaxploitation horror films as "address[ing] the specific fantasy needs of the black social imaginary". In other words, these films are helping to portray what the African American community wants to see in their community. These films were meant to be a form of identification and empowerment to the black community and to help overcome racial bias.

Blaxploitation horror films engage a number of contemporary social and political concerns. As Jamil Mustafa demonstrates, they appropriate the archetypes of Gothic fiction and film to address "issues of vital importance to American society and culture in the 1970s", including "race relations, the movements for civil and gay rights, the Vietnam War, illicit medical experimentation, and tensions between minorities and the police".

Many of the monsters portrayed in these films can be seen as representations of black power and black pride. They also tend to push the boundaries of human sexuality. Much of the plot tends to be driven by sex. Blaxploitation horror films involving vampires explore queerness and the relationship between the movements for black and gay civil rights. Characters that are seen as stereotypically "normal" are often rejected by the audience because they are not as easy to relate to. These characters would include the authority figure (mentioned above) and heterosexual couples. While these characters are often able to be related to in mainstream media, oppressed people tended to see them as a representation of their oppressors.

== Controversy ==
While many people viewed blaxploitation horror as a celebration of African American culture, others did not view them in such a positive light. People started to view these films as perpetuating negative stereotypes about the African American community. There were leagues formed to prevent the making of these types of films. Members of the NAACP founded The Coalition Against Blaxploitation Movies. They even went on to use radical tactics to stop the productions of certain films. William Crain stated in an interview that members of the Coalition Against Blaxploitation Movies tied him up in a chair and told him to leave his studio in an effort to stop production of one of his films.

Many of the films portrayed African American males as a stereotype of hyper-sexual beasts who ravish and demoralize woman. They help to portray the fear that the white media has instilled in its viewers. These films depicting motifs of the African American male raping white women are seen as misogynist.

Many of these horror films address the stereotype of African Americans partaking in bestiality. The monsters that African Americans portray in these films tend to be more animalistic compared with monsters in mainstream Hollywood films. The animalistic monsters supposedly go around terrorizing and having sex with the female actors in an effort to portray bestiality.

As urban horror films emerged in the 1990s, they began to portray African Americans as gangsters and thugs living in the "ghetto" that partake in illegal activities and take advantage of women.

== 1990s–2010s ==
Due to the controversy surrounding blaxploitation horror films, many are no longer being made. Many film production companies see the theme as a fad that has run its course and decided to stop funding the projects. While some directors have continued to produce these types of films, like Black Devil Doll from Hell and Tales from the QuadeaD Zone they were produced with a minimal budget and were poorly made. New York filmmaker Sean Weathers continues to make films in the blaxploitation horror genre.

During the early 1990s a group of African American directors sought to revive the genre. They put a modern twist on it by setting the films in urban areas, these films were directed at African Americans who lived in "the hood." They portrayed themes of crime, drugs, and poverty in an effort to relate to the new generation of oppressed African Americans.

For example, the 1990 black urban horror film Def by Temptation, directed by James Bond III, looks at a group of urban, African American professionals during the AIDS epidemic. Bond wanted to show the ever-present danger of AIDS in the urban community at the time.

Also, many of the films have influences of hip hop in them, and even star rappers like LL Cool J and Snoop Dogg (mentioned above), as well as others like Ice Cube, Ice-T, Will Smith, Busta Rhymes, Redman, Method Man, Treach, Rah Digga, Mos Def, Tone Loc, MC Eiht, Spice 1, Mack 10, Ja Rule, Sticky Fingaz, Fredro Starr, Big Gipp, Kurupt, Mia X, Master P, and Lil' Romeo.

The 2001 urban horror film Bones, directed by Ernest R. Dickerson and starring the rapper Snoop Dogg, is an example of the hip hop influences that have been introduced to this genre. The film is about a gangster that comes back from the dead to avenge his murder.

== See also ==
- Race in horror films

== Works cited ==
- "1970's BLAXPLOITATION / HORROR HISTORY in 1970's Forum." THE HORROR DRUNX - Horror Movie Message Boards Forums. Web. 15 Feb. 2011.<https://web.archive.org/web/20101217154548/http://thehorrordrunx.yuku.com/topic/1634%3E.
- Anolik, Ruth Bienstock, and Douglas L. Howard. "Part I: Demonizing the Racial Other, Humanizing the Self." The Gothic Other: Racial and Social Constructions in the Literary Imagination. Jefferson, NC: McFarland &, 2004. 74. Print.
- Benshoff, Harry M (2000). "Blaxploitation Horror Films: Generic Reappropriation or Reinscription?". Cinema Journal. 39 (2): 31–50. doi:10.1353/cj.2000.0001. S2CID 144087335. Project MUSE 7477.
- Blacula (1972) - IMDb." The Internet Movie Database (IMDb). Web. 15 Feb. 2011. <https://www.imdb.com/title/tt0068284/>.
- "Black Horror Movie Hall of Fame - Black Horror Movies.com African-americans in Horror Films." Black Horror Movies.com African-Americans in Horror Films Tony Todd Ken Foree Blaxploitation Blacula Tales from the Hood Blade Blackenstein Petey Wheatstraw Thing with Two Heads. Web. 15 Feb. 2011. <http://www.blackhorrormovies.com/halloffame.htm>.
- "Black Horror Movie Stereotypes" - Black Horror Movies.com African-Americans in Horror Films." Black Horror Movies.com African-Americans in Horror Films Tony Todd Ken Foree Blaxploitation Blacula Tales from the Hood Blade Blackenstein Petey Wheatstraw Thing with Two Heads. Web. 15 Feb. 2011. <http://www.blackhorrormovies.com/types.htm>.
- Bones (2001) - IMDb." The Internet Movie Database (IMDb). Web. 15 Feb. 2011. <https://www.imdb.com/title/tt0166110/>.
- Harris, Mark H. "African-American Horror Movies - Black Horror Movies." Horror and Suspense Movies and TV Shows - Reviews, Photos, News, Upcoming Releases, Trailers. Web. 15 Feb. 2011. <http://horror.about.com/od/horrormoviesubgenres/a/blackmovies.htm >.
- The Internet Movie Database (IMDb). Web. 15 Feb. 2011. <https://www.imdb.com/>.
- Lawrence, Novotny. "Deadlier than Dracula." Blaxploitation Films of the 1970s Blackness and Genre. New York [u.a.: Routledge, 2008. 53–59. Print.
- Mustafa, Jamil. The Blaxploitation Horror Film: Adaptation, Appropriation and the Gothic. Cardiff: University of Wales Press, 2023. Print.
- Paszylk, Bartlomiej. Scream, Blacula, Scream (1973) and Horror Express (1973).
- "The Pleasure and Pain of Cult Horror Films: an Historical Survey." North Carolina: McFarland &, 2009. 125–30. Print.
- "Rapper "Slash" Actor - Black Horror Movies.com Hip-hop Film DVD Ice Cube Ice-T LL Cool J Snoop Dogg Will Smith Coolio Redman Method Man." BlackHorrorMovies.com African-americans in Horror Films Tony Todd Ken Foree Blaxploitation Blacula Tales from the Hood Blade Blackenstein Petey Wheatstraw Thing with Two Heads. Web. 15 Feb. 2011. <http://www.blackhorrormovies.com/rappers.htm>.
- Reid, Mark A. "Two African American Horrors." Black Lenses, Black Voices: African American Film Now. Lanham: Rowman & Littlefield, 2005. 61–76. Print.
- "The Very Best of Blaxploitation Horror - AMC Movie Database - Movie Guide." AMC Movie Guide. Web. 15 Feb. 2011. <https://web.archive.org/web/20110707130437/http://movies.amctv.com/movie-guide/the-very-best-of-blaxploitation-horror.php>.
