= Dr. Black, Mr. Hyde =

1976 American blaxploitation horror film by William Crain

- Theatrical release poster by Joseph Smith
- Directed by: William Crain
- Written by: Lawrence Woolner
- Based on: Strange Case of Dr. Jekyll and Mr. Hyde by Robert Louis Stevenson
- Produced by: Charles Walker
- Starring: Bernie Casey; Rosalind Cash; Marie O'Henry; Ji-Tu Cumbuka; Milt Kogan; Stu Gilliam
- Cinematography: Tak Fujimoto
- Edited by: John C. Horger
- Music by: Johnny Pate
- Distributed by: Dimension Pictures Inc.
- Release date: February 6, 1976 (Atlanta)
- Running time: 87 minutes
- Country: United States
- Language: English

Dr. Black, Mr. Hyde is a 1976 American blaxploitation horror film loosely inspired by the 1886 novella Strange Case of Dr. Jekyll and Mr. Hyde by Robert Louis Stevenson. The film stars Bernie Casey and Rosalind Cash, and was directed by William Crain. Along with Crain, and it was written by Larry LeBron and Lawrence Woolner with cinematography by Tak Fujimoto. It was filmed primarily in Los Angeles, at locations such as the Watts Towers.

== Plot ==
In Los Angeles, Dr. Henry Pride is an accomplished and wealthy African American medical doctor working on a cure for cirrhosis of the liver along with his colleague, Dr. Billie Worth (Rosalind Cash). Desperate to create this remedy, Pride conducts unethical experiments on others and himself, which turns him into Hyde, a white-skinned Frankensteinian monster with superhuman strength and invincibility. Pride begins a spree throughout Watts, killing prostitutes and pimps. After not being able to test his remedy on Linda Monte, he continues his rampage, which results in him being chased down by the police. Cornered at the Watts Towers, he attempts to escape by climbing up the towers, which leads to the police gunning him down and causing him to fall to his death.

== Cast ==
- Bernie Casey as Dr. Henry Pride / Hyde
- Rosalind Cash as Dr. Billie Worth
- Marie O'Henry as Linda Monte
- Ji-Tu Cumbuka as Lieutenant Jackson
- Milt Kogan as Lieutenant Harry O'Connor
- Stu Gilliam as Silky
- Marc Alaimo as Preston
- Elizabeth Robinson as Cissy Hubbard
- Della Thomas as Bernice Watts

== Background ==
=== Blaxploitation horror subgenre ===
Dr. Black, Mr. Hyde is one of many films which constitute the blaxploitation genre. Specifically, it was part of the blaxploitation horror genre that came about in the late 1960s and early 1970s with the box office success of American International Pictures’ Blacula, which was also directed by William Crain. With Blacula's success, American International Pictures saw a new opportunity to produce classic horror films with black actors and actresses to attract a new black moviegoing audience. As a result, the production company wanted to play off the classic story and horror film Dr. Jekyll and Mr. Hyde. According to Harry M. Benshoff, many of the films that were part of the blaxploitation genre exhibited similar themes and symbols to other blaxploitation movies such as “references to the Black Panthers, Afrocentric style, soul food, white racism (both institutionalized and personal), and urban ghetto life". Dr, Black, Mr. Hyde exhibits many of these qualities that have been seen throughout the blaxploitation genre of the 1960s and 1970s.

Cynthia Erb delves into many different aspects and themes of Dr. Black, Mr. Hyde, while also discussing the blaxploitation horror genre, in her book Tracking King Kong: A Hollywood Icon in World Culture. Erb writes that the blaxploitation genre was plagued with many problems, but did have key points of strength. The same can be said for Dr. Black, Mr. Hyde. She thinks that the film only contains gratuitous nudity and racial stereotypes to align with the “commercial obligation” expected of the genre. She finds the social message of Dr. Black, Mr. Hyde to be one of its strengths; for most of the film, Crain focuses on “using the horror framework to treat pressing social themes.” Despite this strength, the opening scene can be problematic as it “places visual emphasis on Linda’s nudity” as if it were trying to meet that “commercial obligation” of any other blaxploitation film.

According to Frederick Douglass in the Atlanta Daily World, the film was "for escapism and fun" as "everything is taken in an extreme and comes off as being comical rather than serious."

== Historical context and culture ==
=== Tuskegee syphilis experiments and Frankenstein ===
At one point in the film, Dr. Henry Pride (Bernie Casey) takes Linda Monte (Marie O'Henry) back to his house after a date, where she refuses to be tested on; subsequently, he asks: "What if I insist?". In his book, Educational Institutions in Horror Film: A History of Mad Professors, Student Bodies, and Final Exams, Andrew L. Grunzke acknowledges how this is eerily similar to the Tuskegee syphilis experiments. Grunzke adds that the "horrors of the Tuskegee experiments were a major impetus for the development of modern research ethics. An African American doctor willing to violate those ethical rules created a highly charged situation in the film." Because of this connotation, Pride reinforces how other African Americans are uneasy with him in that they question the authenticity of his blackness.

Grunzke also argues that Dr. Black, Mr. Hyde provides commentary on evolutionary arguments for slavery by depicting Pride-as-Hyde with "ape-like features, body hair and the like." Being more akin to a Frankenstein monster than a Mr. Hyde, Pride is capitalizing on "the ways that the Frankenstein narrative was embraced by the African American community to turn the tables on this misguided Darwinist argument." (The misguided argument was that African Americans were inferior and thus should be enslaved.) By appearing as a white man to the other characters, it seems that Crain is attempting to depict the white man in a black world as being bestial.

By being more Frankenstein-esque, Pride gains sympathy from the audience as he struggles with being in an unknown world, despite being white when he is Mr. Hyde. Grunzke's argument stems from Elizabeth Young's argument in her book, Black Frankenstein: The Making of an American Metaphor. In Young's book, she argues that the Frankenstein monster "refuses to accept his placelessness". The idea of the Frankenstein monster can be appropriated by African Americans as an idea where the monster is placed in an unknown land and society, and he must react violently to escape the treachery of that society. That metaphor is embraced by the African American community because of how they were forced into a society where they were treated as monsters. In the case of this film, however, the monster is a white man navigating a black world in Watts. The metaphor of the film is complicated further as it is a monster who changes from being black to white.

== Race, class, and Black Power themes ==
Being a blaxploitation film, Dr. Black, Mr. Hyde speaks to many different issues in American and global society concerning race, class, and the Black Power Movement. Especially in the blaxploitation horror subgenre, there is more symbolism in the monster that the movie depicts. Benshoff notes that while horror movie monsters were usually meant to scare and incite fear in the audience, "many blaxploitation horror films reappropriated the mainstream cinema’s monstrous figures for black goals, turning vampires, Frankenstein monsters, and transformation monsters into agents of black pride and black power". The audience would be directed by the film to be more sympathetic of whoever the monster was – usually a "black avenger" who would be in conflict with a racist and oppressive society. In the case of Dr. Black, Mr. Hyde, that monster is the character of Dr. Henry Pride, who the audience is supposed to admire and like.

=== Likeness to King Kong ===
Crain’s depiction of Pride is very much like that of the original King Kong character. Pride is constantly trying to tip-toe the line of space between black and white, where he struggles to maintain footing in both worlds. His struggle is cognizant of King Kong’s in how he must navigate his own divide between the “white affluent areas around UCLA and sections of Watts inhabited by a black underclass."

As Pride navigates between two spaces and two sides throughout the entire film, the ending is a scene directly taken from King Kong. He climbs the Watts Towers, he is wailing and crying as police are shining bright searchlights on him. Rather than the biplanes that attempt to kill King Kong, Los Angeles Police use helicopters to shine bright lights on him as they eventually shoot him, leading to his subsequent fall to his death.

=== Class and the black-white dichotomy ===
Looking to improve the lives of poorer blacks in the community of Watts, Dr. Pride is a successful black doctor who has achieved great wealth and standing within the medical community – he is a likable and idyllic character. However, some like Benshoff argue that Dr. Black, Mr. Hyde is different from other blaxploitation horror films in that it examines how the “good-black, bad-white dichotomy” is played in society, as Dr. Pride is considered to be a black man who has ‘sold’ himself out to white America to be a part of the black middle class. That theme is depicted early on within the first few scenes of the film. Despite flirting with Dr. Pride, Linda calls him a "cop out" who "dresses white, thinks white, and probably even drives a white car. [Linda] adds, 'the only time [Pride is] around black people is when [he is] down [at the Watts clinic] clearing [his] conscience."

Erb believes that Pride is a “tormented black protagonist forced to negotiate racially separate worlds but destroyed in the effort.” The film shows him as a man who comes from nothing, as he was born in a brothel to an alcoholic mother. The audience is supposed to think that he is simply looking for a remedy for cirrhosis of the liver, yet he is actually trying to help and cure the “black urban underclass.” Other characters throughout the film, like Linda, see him as an ambitious man who wants to live like the “white professional class and forget his origins,” yet those characters do not see the internal, psychological struggle that his experiences throughout the film. Erb maintains that he is not attempting to cure a disease in others, but rather his own social disease that is chronic and psychological. The audience sees him continuously returning to different areas that are either representative of, or actually in, his past. Whether it is as Dr. Pride or Mr. Hyde, he visits these areas to reaffirm his own authentic blackness after crossing a societal boundary into the white professional class, where he is out of touch with the black people that he knew all of his life.

=== Symbolism of the monstrous white man ===
The “good-black, bad-white" dichotomy at play is important for the subsequent scenes of the movie because of the characterization of the monster that Pride becomes.

Like many blaxploitation films before it, Dr. Black, Mr. Hyde uses stereotypical images of African Americans to alert the audience to their blackness. Erb notices how Linda is a stereotypical prostitute, while Silky (Stu Gilliam) is a pimp who wears a cape and gold chains. No matter how insignificant of a character Silky is, “Silky becomes perhaps more significant as the black victim of Mr. White’s expensive white car, which crushes [Silky] against a wall after catching him in glaring white light.” Both Silky and Linda are then shown as stereotypes of blacks because it reinforces the monstrous and murderous acts of Mr. White, who is killing black victims.

Erb argues that Dr. Black, Mr. Hyde redefines the traditional use of black and white as symbols for evil and good, respectively, “so that black is the norm and white has extremely destructive connotations. When Pride changes, he goes from being a handsome black man to a grotesque white monster” who goes on killing rampages. Crain and the film then begin to emphasize the “lavish white car [Pride] drives” to reinforce the connotation that wealthy whiteness is destructive and murderous of black people.

In other blaxploitation horror films, the monster can be considered a “racial Other” that is from a major, urban city like “New York, Chicago, Los Angeles, or Miami." However, what is interesting is how Dr. Black, Mr. Hyde uses the black-white dichotomy of the film to make the monster turn from a “racial Other” to a white man, which is very different from the other blaxploitation horror films of the era.

== Reception ==
Like many blaxploitation films from the era, critical reviews of Dr. Black, Mr. Hyde thought the film was subpar. Especially in the case of the blaxploitation horror subgenre, films were considered successful if they did well in the box office. In the case of Dr. Black, Mr. Hyde, Bernie Casey was one of the primary selling points of the movie. The Atlanta Daily World raved about Casey in a 1976 article. He was described as a “modern Renaissance Man” who excelled as a scholar, an artist, and an athlete. At the time of the premiere of Dr. Black, Mr. Hyde in Atlanta, GA at the RIALTO, he was highly regarded, as he had received critical acclaim for his role in Guns of the Magnificent Seven, Cleopatra Jones and Maurie.

Frederick Douglass of Afro-American wrote that he liked Dr. Black, Mr. Hyde in his editorial review. He considered Casey to be “very convincing in his dual role” within the film. Douglass found the film entertaining and he describes it as rather “comical”, as Casey throws people around and kills them easily with superhuman strength. Despite how comical it may seem, Douglass did note in his review that the interpretation that Casey’s character’s murders of sex workers and pimps as a white monster symbolized “white as evil." Douglass did not take the film that seriously, but he appreciated the themes that the film attempted to convey.

Despite how some black audiences received the film, others abhorred it. Linda Gross of the Los Angeles Times hated the film and described it as “rot”, with the exception of Tak Fujimoto’s cinematography and the presence of both Marie O’Henry and the Watts Towers. She despised the campy writing and thought that the “authenticity [was] also sorely lacking."
