= Ji-Tu Cumbuka =

American actor (1940–2017)

- Born: March 4, 1940; Helena, Alabama, U.S.
- Died: July 4, 2017 (aged 77); Atlanta, Georgia, U.S.
- Occupation: Actor
- Years active: 1968–2004
- Children: 1

Ji-Tu Cumbuka (March 4, 1940 – July 4, 2017) was an American actor. He is best remembered as "Torque" in the short-lived TV series A Man Called Sloane together with Robert Conrad and Dan O'Herlihy.

In 2011, Cumbuka published his autobiography A Giant to Remember: The Black Actor in Hollywood. He has a son and a granddaughter.

== Early life ==
Cumbuka was born in 1940 in Helena, Alabama, to a Baptist minister. After attending Texas Southern University he moved to California to pursue his acting career, and went to Columbia College in New York City, earning a Bachelor of Arts in theatre and a master's degree in cinematography. He landed a role in the 1968 movie Uptight directed by Jules Dassin.

== Acting career ==
Cumbuka appeared in such television productions as the Roots miniseries, Daniel Boone, Young Dan'l Boone, Knots Landing, The A-Team, The Dukes of Hazzard, Murder She Wrote, Walker, Texas Ranger, CSI: Crime Scene Investigation, Amen, 227, Sanford and Son, Hunter, In the Heat of the Night, and Matlock. He was a main cast member of the spy TV series A Man Called Sloane with Robert Conrad and Dan O'Herlihy.

Cumbuka also appeared in numerous films. He appeared as former NBA guard Oscar Robertson in the biodrama pic Maurie (1973) about the life of Maurice Stokes. In Harlem Nights (1989), he plays the toothless drunk gambler who gets shot over money. Other films in which he appeared include (but are not limited to) Change of Habit with Elvis Presley (1969), Blacula (1972), Trader Horn (1973), Lost in the Stars (1974), Mandingo (1975), Dr. Black, Mr. Hyde (1976), Bound for Glory (1976), The Jericho Mile (1979), Doin' Time (1985), Brewster's Millions (1985), Volunteers (1985), Out of Bounds (1986), Moving (1988), and Caged in Paradiso (1990). Cumbuka wrote, produce, and acted in the gospel musical play Help Somebody, co-starring with Kene Holliday, Hall Williams, Ali Woodson, and Glynn Turman. It debuted in Washington, D.C. in the late 90s.

== Death ==
Cumbuka died at the age of 77 on July 4, 2017, after a six-month battle with cancer. In a statement to CNN, Eddie Murphy said, "It's a sad day for everyone in the industry. He was a great actor and a good man."

== Filmography ==
Year	Title	Role	Notes
1968	Uptight	Rick	
1969	Change of Habit	Hawk	
1972	Top of the Heap	Pot Peddler	
1972	Blacula	Skillet	
1972	Up the Sandbox	Black Captain	
1973	Trader Horn	Orange Stripe	
1973	Maurie	Oscar	
1974	Lost in the Stars	Johannes	
1975	Mandingo	Cicero	
1976	Dr. Black, Mr. Hyde	Lt. Jackson	
1976	Bound for Glory	Slim Snedeger - Hobo on Train	
1977	Fun with Dick and Jane	Guard	
1977	Angela		
1979	Walk Proud	Sgt. Gannett	
1984	Bachelor Party	Alley Pimp	
1985	Doin' Time	Bernie Feldstein	
1985	Brewster's Millions	Melvin	
1985	Volunteers	Cicero	
1986	Out of Bounds	Lemar	
1987	Outrageous Fortune	Cab Driver	
1988	Moving	Edwards	
1988	Glitch!	Mookie	
1989	Harlem Nights	Toothless Gambler	
1989	Murder, She Wrote	Calder Williams	
1990	Caged in Paradiso	Josh	
1993	Midnight Edition	Reginald Brown	
