= Rewind This! =

- Directed by: Josh Johnson
- Produced by: Midori Inoue; Carolee Mitchell
- Cinematography: Christopher Palmer
- Edited by: Christopher Palmer
- Music by: Josh Freda
- Production company: Imperial PolyFarm Productions
- Release date: March 11, 2013 (SXSW)
- Running time: 94 minutes
- Country: United States
- Language: English

Rewind This! is a 2013 documentary film directed by Josh Johnson about the impact of VHS on the film industry and home video, as well as about collectors of videotapes.

== Interviewees ==
- Atom Egoyan
- Mamoru Oshii
- Frank Henenlotter
- Roy Frumkes
- Charles Band
- Cassandra Peterson
- Jason Eisener
- Lloyd Kaufman
- Drew McWeeny
- Peter Rowe
- David Schmoeller
- Ben Steinbauer

== Release ==
The documentary screened at numerous film festivals around the world, including SXSW Film Festival, Neuchâtel International Fantastic Film Festival, Fantasia International Film Festival, Melbourne International Film Festival, Strasbourg European Fantastic Film Festival, Telluride Horror Show, Sitges Film Festival, Orlando Film Festival, and several others.

== Reception ==
The documentary was received with critical acclaim. On the review aggregator website Rotten Tomatoes, 100% of 19 critics' reviews are positive. The website's consensus reads: "An ode to abandoned technology with some admirably wide-ranging insights, Rewind This! is entertaining viewing even for those who didn't live through the VHS era."

Writing in Twitch Film, J. Hurtado praised the film for being more than just about the collectors, as the filmmakers, "managed to distill the experience down to its most potent ingredients and leave the audience with a highly satisfying straight shot of movie love."

Jacob S. Hall named the documentary one of the Top 10 Movies Discovered at SXSW 2013 on Movies.com, writing that "the film finds the perfect mixture of nostalgia and forward thinking, acknowledging the past while taking a bold look at what a world free of physical media will look like." The Hollywood Reporter called the film, "an entertaining, sometimes enlightening history of the video format; though unsurprisingly small-screen friendly, it will be a crowd-pleaser at fests and in niche bookings." A review from the Telluride Horror Show noted: "An unbending passion of cinema appreciation pours excitedly from Johnson's interview subjects, and there is a prevailing sense of humor that permits the subject to never take itself too seriously."

== See also ==
- Adjust Your Tracking: The Untold Story of the VHS Collector (2013)
