= Caged in Paradiso =

- Directed by: Mike Snyder
- Written by: Michele Thyne
- Produced by: John G. Thomas
- Starring: Irene Cara; Peter Kowanko; Paula Bond; Joseph Culp
- Cinematography: James Rosenthal
- Music by: Kevin Klingler; Bob Mamet' "Paradiso" performed by Irene Cara
- Distributed by: Vidmark Entertainment
- Release date: May 4, 1989
- Running time: 90 minutes
- Country: United States
- Language: English

Caged in Paradiso (alternate title Maximum Security) is a 1989 American low-budget action film directed by Mike Snyder and starring Irene Cara (who also sings the theme song "Paradiso"), Peter Kowanko and Paula Bond. It was filmed on St. Thomas in the United States Virgin Islands. In the USA, Vidmark released the movie on 24 January 1990 direct to video.

== Plot ==
A domestic-terrorist is convicted. His wife agrees to accompany him, when they are placed on a futuristic island prison. On this isolated, tropical island the unsupervised inmates spend the rest of their days fending for themselves. The couple are separated on arrival, and the wife learns how to defend herself to stay safe. On being united, the wife loses esteem for her husband and plans her escape.

== Cast ==
- Irene Cara as Eva
- Pete Kowanko as Eric
- Paula Bond as Queenie
- Joseph Culp as terrorist
- Luis Vera as Jocelito
- Wolf Muser as Helmut
- Christopher Pennock as McHenry
- Laurence Haddon as Senator Paradiso
- Wycliffe Young as instructor
- "Big" John Studd as big man
- Beverly Purcell as Rosa
- Ji-Tu Cumbuka as Josh
