= Blacula =

1972 film by William Crain

- Theatrical release poster
- Directed by: William Crain
- Screenplay by: Joan Torres; Raymond Koenig; Richard Glouner
- Produced by: Joseph T. Naar
- Starring: William Marshall; Vonetta McGee; Denise Nicholas; Gordon Pinsent; Charles Macaulay; Thalmus Rasulala
- Cinematography: John M. Stephens
- Edited by: Allan Jacobs
- Music by: Gene Page
- Production companies: Power Productions; American International Pictures
- Distributed by: American International Pictures
- Release date: August 25, 1972 (United States)
- Running time: 93 minutes
- Country: United States
- Language: English
- Box office: $1,980,000

Blacula is a 1972 American blaxploitation horror film directed by William Crain. It stars William Marshall in the title role about an 18th-century African prince named Mamuwalde, who is turned into a vampire (and later locked in a coffin) by Count Dracula in the Count's castle in Transylvania in the year 1780 after Dracula refuses to help Mamuwalde suppress the slave trade. The film co-stars Vonetta McGee, Denise Nicholas, Gordon Pinsent and Thalmus Rasulala.

The film was released by American International Pictures on August 25, 1972. Blacula was released to mixed reviews in the United States, but was one of the top-grossing films of the year. It was the first film to receive an award for Best Horror Film at the Saturn Awards. It was followed by the sequel Scream Blacula Scream in 1973 and inspired a wave of blaxploitation-themed horror films.

== Plot ==
In 1780, African prince Mamuwalde goes to Transylvania to seek the help of Count Dracula in suppressing the slave trade. Dracula refuses, however, and insults Mamuwalde by making a pass at his wife, Luva. After a scuffle with Dracula's minions, Mamuwalde is bitten by Dracula and transformed into a vampire while dead. Dracula then curses him with the name "Blacula" and imprisons him in a sealed coffin in a crypt hidden beneath his castle while leaving Luva with Mamuwalde to die in the chamber.

In 1972, two interior decorators, Bobby McCoy and Billy Schaffer, find the coffin and are informed that the coffin was previously owned by Count Dracula, who was killed by Van Helsing in the late 1800s (much like in the original Dracula novel). After purchasing the coffin and shipping it to Los Angeles, Bobby and Billy open the coffin, only to become Mamuwalde's first victims. At the funeral home where McCoy's body is laid, Mamuwalde spies on mourning friends Tina Williams, her sister Michelle, and Michelle's boyfriend, Dr. Gordon Thomas, a pathologist for the Los Angeles Police Department. Mamuwalde becomes infatuated with Tina, believing her to be the reincarnation of Luva due to her identically resembling the latter. Thomas notices oddities with McCoy's death that he later concludes to be consistent with vampire folklore. Mamuwalde follows Tina after leaving the funeral home but unintentionally frightens her. Tina runs away from him, and Mamuwalde loses her when he is hit by a cab. He then kills the cabbie, Juanita Jones, turning her into a vampire.

Thomas, Michelle, and Tina celebrate Michelle's birthday at a nightclub, and Mamuwalde shows up to return Tina's purse, which she'd dropped the night before. Thomas answers a phone call from the funeral director, who informs him that McCoy's body has gone missing. Mamuwalde asks Tina to see him again the following evening, but they are interrupted by Nancy, a photographer who takes a photograph of them together. Soon after, Mamuwalde kills Nancy and destroys the photo she just developed, which shows Mamuwalde conspicuously absent.

Soon after, a police car pulls up near Nancy's house. As the officer is getting out, he sees Nancy stumble onto the porch. He goes over to check on her as she's asking for help. When he picks her up to go get help, Nancy bites him, turning him into a vampire.

The next evening, Mamuwalde visits Tina at her apartment and shares how Dracula enslaved him and Luva and how he was cursed with vampirism. He and Tina then spend the night together.

Thomas, Lt. Jack Peters, and Michelle are meanwhile following the trail of murder victims, as Thomas begins to suspect a vampire of being the perpetrator. After Thomas and Michelle dig up Schaffer's coffin, the corpse rises as a vampire and attacks Thomas, who fends him off and drives a stake through his heart. Michelle now realizes the truth and that McCoy could still be out there. Telling Peters won't work, because they need to show him what's going on, and to do this, they'd need to thaw out the corpse of Juanita Jones. Thomas calls the morgue and instructs Sam, the attendant, to take Jones' body out of deep freeze and leave the room and lock the door. Sam rolls her body out, but neglects to lock the door due to a distracting phone call. Suddenly the door opens, and an undead Jones rises and immediately attacks and kills him. Moments later Thomas and Peters arrive at the morgue to find blood smeared on the corridor wall near the payphone where Sam answered the call, but no sign of Sam himself. They walk into the exam room by the freezer, where Peters sees a sheet-covered body lying on a gurney and pulls the sheet back to reveal Jones rising to attack him. Thomas keeps her at bay with a Christian cross long enough to open the window blinds and expose her to sunlight, destroying her.

That evening, Thomas, Michelle, and Tina are enjoying drinks at the club when Mamuwalde arrives to pick Tina up. Thomas questions Mamuwalde about vampires and makes it known that the police are planning a search for the vampire's coffin, provoking an uncomfortable Mamuwalde and Tina to leave. Soon after, remembering that Nancy never gave Michelle her birthday photos, Thomas searches Nancy's house and finds a photo of Tina standing in front of an invisible Mamuwalde. He correctly deduces that Mamuwalde is the vampire they seek, and that Mamuwalde and Tina are together. Thomas rushes to Tina's apartment, finding them embracing. Thomas and Mamuwalde briefly struggle, but Mamuwalde knocks Thomas unconscious and flees, killing a police officer in a nearby alley as he escapes. After McCoy is seen walking the streets of Los Angeles, Thomas, Peters, and several police officers track Mamuwalde to his warehouse hideout. They locate a nest of several vampires there, including McCoy, and destroy them, but Mamuwalde escapes.

Mamuwalde hypnotizes Tina into going to his new hideout at a nearby underground chemical plant while Thomas and the police pursue him. Mamuwalde dispatches several of the officers, but one of them accidentally shoots and mortally wounds Tina. To save her life, Mamuwalde transforms her into a vampire. Mamuwalde fights the police, one of whom locates the coffin and alerts Thomas and Peters. However, Peters kills a newly turned vampiric Tina with a stake, having believed Mamuwalde would be in the coffin instead. Devastated and feeling he has no purpose to live after losing Luva again, Mamuwalde commits suicide by climbing the stairs to the roof where the morning sun destroys him. Thomas and Peters witness Mamuwalde's flesh melting away with maggots coming out of his face until only his skeleton remains.

== Cast ==
- William Marshall as Mamuwalde / Blacula
- Denise Nicholas as Michelle Williams
- Vonetta McGee as Tina Williams / Luva
- Gordon Pinsent as Lt. Jack Peters
- Thalmus Rasulala as Dr. Gordon Thomas
- Emily Yancy as Nancy
- Lance Taylor Sr. as Swenson
- Logan Field as Sergeant Barnes
- Ted Harris as Bobby McCoy
- Rick Metzler as Billy Schaffer
- Ketty Lester as Juanita Jones
- Charles Macaulay as Count Dracula
- Ji-Tu Cumbuka as "Skillet"
- Elisha Cook, Jr. as Sam
- Eric Brotherson as Real Estate Agent
- The Hues Corporation as themselves
- Gene LeBell as Dracula's henchman (uncredited)

== Production ==
According to director William Crain, Blacula was born by American International Pictures' financial troubles in the early '70s. "The rumor was that they were in the red, and so they were going to do a Black vampire," he said. The original script was called Count Brown's in Town, and was "full of 'shuckin' and jivin.'"

Horror scholar Dani Bethea noted the film's similarities with the 1819 short story The Black Vampyre; A Legend of St. Domingo.

After William Marshall was cast to play the lead, he worked with Crain and the producers to heavily retool the main character of Blacula, who was initially more of a straightforward villain. His character name was changed from Andrew Brown to Mamuwalde, and his character received a background story about being an African prince who had succumbed to vampirism from the original Dracula.

Many members of the cast and crew of Blacula had worked in television. William Crain had directed episodes of The Mod Squad. William Marshall had previously worked in stage productions and in episodes of The Man from U.N.C.L.E., The Nurses, Bonanza, Star Trek and Mannix. Thalmus Rasulala, who plays Dr. Gordon Thomas, is best known for roles in episodes of The Twilight Zone, Perry Mason and Rawhide.

Blacula was in production between late January and late March 1972. It was shot on location in Los Angeles, with some scenes shot in Watts and the final scenes taken at the Hyperion Outfall Treatment Plant in Playa del Rey.

== Music ==
The music for Blacula is unlike that of most horror films as it features a funk soundtrack, as opposed to classical music. The film's soundtrack features a score by Gene Page and contributions by the Hues Corporation.

== Release ==
Blacula opened in Washington, Dallas, Seattle and Oklahoma City on August 25, 1972, and in Chicago two days later. Prior to its release, American International Pictures' marketing department wanted to ensure that black audiences would be interested in Blacula; some posters for the film included references to slavery. American International Pictures also held special promotional showings at two New York theaters; anyone wearing a flowing cape would receive free admission. Blacula was popular in America, debuting at #24 on Variety's list of top films. It eventually grossed over 1 million dollars, making it one of the highest-grossing films of 1972.

=== Home media ===
Scream Factory released the film on Blu-ray as a double feature with Scream Blacula Scream on March 2, 2015.

== Reception ==
=== Critical reception ===
Blacula received mixed reviews on its initial release. Variety gave the film a positive review praising the screenplay, music and acting by William Marshall. The Chicago Reader praised the film, writing that it would leave its audience more satisfied than many other "post-Lugosi efforts". Gene Siskel of the Chicago Tribune awarded three stars out of four, calling it "well-made and quite frightening." A review from Roger Greenspun in The New York Times was negative, stating that anyone who "goes to a vampire movie expecting sense is in serious trouble, and Blacula offers less sense than most." In Films & Filming, a reviewer referred to the film as "totally unconvincing on every level". The Monthly Film Bulletin described the film as "a disappointing model for what promised to be an exciting new genre, the black horror film." and that apart from the introductory scene, "the film conspicuously fails to pick up on any of its theme's more interesting possibilities–cinematic or philosophical." The film was awarded the Best Horror Film title at the 1st Saturn Awards.

Among more recent reviews, Kim Newman of Empire gave the film two stars out of five, finding the film to be "formulaic and full of holes". Time Out gave the film a negative review, stating that it "remains a lifeless reworking of heroes versus vampires with soul music and a couple of good gags." Film4 awarded the film three and a half stars out of five, calling it "essential blaxploitation viewing." AllMovie gave the film two and a half stars out of five, noting that Blacula is "better than its campy title might lead one to believe...the film suffers from the occasional bit of awkward humor (the bits with the two homosexual interior decorators are the most squirm-inducing), but Joan Torres and Raymond Koenig's script keeps things moving at a fast clip and generates some genuine chills." The Dissolve gave the film two and a half stars, stating that "The placement of an old-fashioned, Bela Lugosi-type Dracula—albeit much, much sweatier—in a modern black neighborhood is a great idea, but the amateurish production leaves Marshall as stranded in the film as his Mamuwalde is stranded in the times."

On Rotten Tomatoes, the film holds an approval rating of 46% based on 28 reviews, with a weighted average rating of 5.3/10.

== Themes ==
Blacula is notable for featuring the first Black vampire in film history. Robin R. Means Coleman, in her book Horror Noire: Blacks in American Horror Films from the 1890s to Present, writes that the film reimagines classic horror archetypes to a contemporary Black experience Lea Anderson, in Fangoria, described it as "anti-adaptation,"

Blacula not only does the work of, as Dr. Robin Means-Coleman describes, “reimagining the classics” to “[reinvent] the [horror] genre from the vantage point of Blackness,” but accomplishes this so effectively as to transform the narrative into a wholly original piece of Black art, tricky as that may be to articulate. The brilliance of Crain's adaptation is that it's actually an anti-adaptation. It doesn't seek out narrative minstrelsy (when Blackness is casually splashed on a white story as the film's title suggests) but rather uses that familiarity as a red herring to tell a different story altogether.

Means-Coleman states the film allegorizes the Atlantic slave trade.

In the film, the name “Blacula” is a curse bestowed upon Prince Mamuwalde by the Count (Charles Macaulay); “a slave name,” as Coleman notes. Dracula transforms him into a monster in the same gesture as this attempt to “[rob him] of his (African) identity”—and make no mistake, Mamuwalde does become a monster, sympathetic as he may be. After centuries incarcerated in a coffin, he “makes a much-belated trip through the Middle Passage” and “finally makes his appearance in the new world—enslaved by vampirism and auctioned off” as part of an estate sale to the interracial queer couple who become his first victims.... As a byproduct of centering Black perspective, Crain actually deepens Stoker's characterization of Dracula by placing him in an eighteenth-century context that characterizes the slave trade and chattel slavery as parasitic institutions. The Count of [Bram] Stoker's imagination would be a slaveowner (complicated as that legacy is for its xenophobic, antisemitic coding). As such, Mamuwalde's disgust for both him and the slave trade offers a counternarrative to common misconceptions about pre-colonial African culture, demonstrates Black resistance to enslavement without completely revising that history, and complicates the binary of hero/monster that is so often taken for granted.

Horror scholar Dani Bethea said in a Fangoria interview:

The story of Mamuwalde is such a poignant and heartbreaking one that truly has an incontestable tether to the Candyman mythos—Black men in the prime of their lives, caught betwixt and between insidious white supremacist structures that wield some sort of damnation (vampirism in this case) as an everlasting punishment. It's chilling and brings to mind the zonbi narratives and folklore I learned about as a child that spoke of 'the walking dead', its connection to slavery (which the film delved into that Mamuwalde was trying to stop), and the horror of a non-afterlife where one is cursed to walk the earth forever. It is also notable that Billy and Bobby are considered to be the first gay-coded couple in a horror movie.

== Aftermath and influence ==
The box office success of Blacula sparked a wave of other Black-themed horror films. American International was planning a follow-up film titled Blackenstein, but chose to focus on a direct sequel to Blacula instead. Blackenstein was eventually produced by Exclusive International Pictures.

Other, similarly themed films produced in the wake of Blacula included Ganja & Hess (also featuring Black vampires), Abby (also starring William Marshall), and Sugar Hill.

The film's portrayal of a Black vampire influenced the creation of the Marvel Comic The Tomb of Dracula and its breakout character, Blade. Troy Brownfield noted Marshall's portrayal of the title character influenced later Black horror antagonists in films like Candyman (1992), Tales from the Hood (1995), and Bones (2001).

In the animated television series The Grim Adventures of Billy & Mandy, the depiction of Dracula (voiced by Phil LaMarr) is inspired by Blacula.

Blacula appears briefly in The Simpsons episode "All's Fair in Oven War" (season 16, episode 2), voiced by Karl Wiedergott.

Comics writer John Jennings said "[Blacula's influence is] immeasurable. Because it was one of the first really serious, very slick, very nicely done [Black horror films]."

== Related media ==
=== Sequel ===
A sequel to the film titled Scream Blacula Scream was released in 1973 by American International. The film again stars William Marshall in the title role, along with actress Pam Grier. It failed to recapture the financial success of its predecessor.

=== Graphic novel ===
A graphic novel adaptation, Blacula: Return of the King, was published in 2023 by Zombie Love Studios. It was written by Rodney Barnes and drawn by Jason Shawn Alexander.

=== Reboot film ===
On June 17, 2021, it was announced that a reboot was in development. The film will be a co-production between MGM, Bron Studios and Hidden Empire Film Group with Roxanne Avent producing and Deon Taylor and Micah Ranum co-writing. Taylor will also direct the film.

== See also ==
- List of American films of 1972
- Vampire film
- The Black Vampyre: A Legend of St. Domingo

== Works cited ==
- Lawrence, Novotny (2008). Blaxploitation films of the 1970s: Blackness and genre. Routledge. ISBN 9780415960977.
- Kane, Tim (2006). The Changing Vampire of Film and Television. McFarland & Co. ISBN 0786426764.
