= Chester Novell Turner =

American film director

- Born: September 30, 1946 (age 80); United States
- Occupation: Film director
- Notable work: Black Devil Doll From Hell; Tales from the QuadeaD Zone

Chester Novell Turner (born September 30, 1946) is an American filmmaker known for his blaxploitation horror films Black Devil Doll From Hell and Tales from the QuadeaD Zone. Since their releases in the 1980s, Turner's movies have developed cult followings and are considered to be much sought after collector's items. A copy of Black Devil Doll From Hell is currently archived by the Yale University Library, and Turner's other movie was featured as part of a horror film symposium hosted by Yale University in 2016.

Turner has expressed interest in creating sequels to both of his movies.

== Filmmaking career ==
Prior to creating Black Devil Doll From Hell and Tales from the QuadeaD Zone, Turner wrote several horror stories and worked in the home remodeling business. He began developing his films during the 1980s after the advent of home video recorders made amateur filmmaking more accessible to non-professional creators. His first film, Black Devil Doll From Hell, was filmed over a period of several years. Turner, who had no prior experience, took a correspondence course in filmmaking before shooting his first movie. During filming Turner began dating his female star, Shirley L. Jones, and the pair's working relationship would continue into Turner's second movie.

Turner released his first film through the now-defunct video distributor Hollywood Home Video, who heavily edited the movie prior to its release in 1984. He would later describe the experience as unpleasant, as Turner was unable to tell how many videos the company sold and potentially received far less than what he was actually owed. This led Turner and Jones to release the second film independently.

In 1996, rumors surfaced that Turner had been killed in a horrifying car accident. Grief spread among his devotees. Although, by then, DVDs had started to replace VHS as the home entertainment option of choice, Turner's films became some of the most prized VHS horror titles among fans who treasured the low-fi beauty of a chunky plastic box of tape.

== Post-filmmaking career ==
After releasing both films, Turner shifted his focus back to his home remodeling business and to raising a family. He remained unaware that his movies had achieved a cult following, as his fanbase was unable to locate him until about 2013, when Louis Justin of Massacre Video tracked Turner down in order to gain permission to release both films to DVD. Prior to Justin locating Turner many fans believed that Turner died in a car accident in the 1990s, a rumor that was only dispelled after Turner began making public appearances.

== Filmography ==
- Black Devil Doll From Hell (1984)
- Tales from the QuadeaD Zone (1987)

== See also ==
- African American cinema
