= Laurence Haddon =

American actor (1922–2013)

- Haddon in Dennis the Menace, 1961
- Born: October 25, 1922; Philadelphia, Pennsylvania, U.S.
- Died: May 10, 2013 (aged 90); Santa Monica, California, U.S.
- Occupation: Actor

Laurence Haddon (October 25, 1922 – May 10, 2013) was an American actor, born in Philadelphia, Pennsylvania. He played Ed McCullogh, the brother of Howard McCullough (Beeson Carroll) in the syndicated soap opera television series Mary Hartman, Mary Hartman. He attended Friends' Central School and Syracuse University. He served in the United States Merchant Marine during World War II.

Haddon died of complications associated with Lewy body disease in Santa Monica, California, on May 10, 2013, at the age of 90.

== Film and Television appearances ==
- Hands of a Stranger (1962) - Police Lt. Syms
- Dennis the Menace (1961-1963, TV Series) - Charles Brady
- Hazel (1961–1966, TV Series) - Bill Fox / Prosecutor
- The Russians Are Coming, the Russians Are Coming (1966) - Bartender (uncredited)
- Torn Curtain (1966) - American Correspondent (uncredited)
- My Three Sons (1966, TV Series) - Don Lennox
- Valley of the Dolls (1967) - Frank - Blue Angel Nightclub Owner (uncredited)
- The Graduate (1967) - Mr. Carlson (uncredited)
- The Flying Nun (1968, TV Series) - Mr. Shapiro
- Room 222 (1969, TV Series) - Roy Gale
- Mission: Impossible (1969-1971, TV Series) - Lee Sheels / Lieutenant Marlov
- The Partridge Family (1970–1971, TV Series) - Coach Dawson / Sergeant Sizemore
- Mannix (1971–1973, TV Series) - Sgt. Carl Simmons / Ted Hanlon
- Sanford and Son (1972) - Ronald Hart
- The Execution of Private Slovik (1974) - Piper
- Kojak (1974, TV Series) - Capt. Ernie Perkins / Steadman
- The Streets of San Francisco (1973–1975, TV Series) - Inspector Wilkins
- Good Times (1975, TV Series) - Monroe
- Mary Hartman, Mary Hartman (1976, TV Series) - Ed McCullough
- Maude (1976, TV Series) - Hal Crandall
- One Day at a Time (1976, TV Series) - Clark
- Prime Time a.k.a. American Raspberry (1977) - General Jackson
- Quincy, M.E. (1977–1981, TV Series) - Dr. Linnamen / Coach Spalding
- Lou Grant (1977-1981, TV Series) - Foreign Editor / McGrath
- The Incredible Hulk (1982, TV Series) - Neil Hines
- Dallas (1980–1986, TV Series) - Franklin Horner
- Hill Street Blues (1982, TV Series) - Public Defender
- Knots Landing (1984–1985, TV Series) - Dr. Mitch Ackerman
- School Spirit (1985) - Dr. Strohman
- Murder, She Wrote (1986, TV Series) - Judge
- Columbo (1990, TV Series) - Dean Howard Gillespie
- Caged in Paradiso (1990) - Sen. Paradiso
- The Fourth Man (1990, CBS Schoolbreak Special) - Principal Williams
- Designing Women (1991) - Judge
- Infinity (1996) - Family Doctor
