= Scream Blacula Scream =

1973 US blaxploitation horror film by Bob Kelljan

- Theatrical release poster
- Directed by: Bob Kelljan
- Written by: Joan Torres; Raymond Koenig; Maurice Jules
- Produced by: Joseph T. Naar
- Starring: William H. Marshall; Don Mitchell; Pam Grier; Michael Conrad; Bernie Hamilton; Richard Lawson
- Cinematography: Isidore Mankofsky
- Edited by: Fabien D. Tordjmann
- Music by: Bill Marx
- Production company: Power Productions
- Distributed by: American International Pictures
- Release date: June 27, 1973
- Running time: 96 minutes
- Country: United States
- Language: English
- Box office: $1 million (US/ Canada rentals)

Scream Blacula Scream is a 1973 American blaxploitation horror film. A sequel to the 1972 film Blacula, the film focuses on the resurrection of the vampire Mamuwalde via voodoo by a voodoo prince named Willis to seek revenge on his adopted sister, Lisa Fortier after she is voted the next voodoo queen. The film was produced by American International Pictures and stars William Marshall, Pam Grier, Don Mitchell, and Michael Conrad. This was also the acting debut of Richard Lawson.

== Plot ==
After Voodoo queen Mama Loa dies, her cult members vote adopted apprentice Lisa Fortier as her successor, leaving her arrogant biological son Willis outraged. Seeking revenge, he buys the bones of Prince Mamuwalde, otherwise known as the vampire Blacula, from Ragman, the former shaman of the voodoo cult and uses voodoo to resurrect the vampire to do his bidding. However, while it brings Blacula back to life, he bites Willis upon awakening. Willis now finds himself in a curse of his own doing: made into a vampire hungering for blood and a slave to the creature he sought to control.

Meanwhile, Justin Carter, Lisa's boyfriend and an ex-police officer with a large collection of acquired African antiquities and an interest in the occult, begins to investigate the murders caused by Mamuwalde and his growing vampire horde. Justin meets Mamuwalde at a party Justin hosts to display the African collection pieces before being moved to the university's museum. They discuss the artifacts, unbeknown to anyone else, that were from the region of Africa Mamuwalde hails, including pieces of jewelry once worn by his late wife, Luva.

Mamuwalde also meets Lisa at the party, and he discovers that she is naturally adept at voodoo. Lisa discovers Mamuwalde's true nature after her friend Gloria falls victim to his bite and is resurrected as a vampire who nearly feeds on her, if not for Mamuwalde's intervention. He later asks her for help to cure him of his vampire curse. Mamuwalde, aware of police interest to apprehend Lisa, orders his minions to safeguard the house to avoid any distractions, threatening harsh consequences to those who defy his orders.

Justin, with the help of L.A.P.D. Lieutenant Harley Dunlop pulls together several other cops to go to the Mamuwalde residence to investigate the recent deaths. While Lisa is performing the ritual to cure Mamuwalde, using a voodoo doll fashioned to look like him, Justin, Harley, and their men raid the house, fighting against Mamuwalde's vampire minions, which include several of their friends. Willis is killed during this scuffle. Justin manages to find Lisa and Mamuwalde and interrupts the ritual. Lisa refuses to help Mamuwalde after she witnesses him kill the other police officers, including Harley, in the house in a fit of rage.

After realizing that Lisa is no longer willing to help him, Mamuwalde rejects his human nature and attacks Justin when he calls the prince by his real name, to which Mamuwalde insists his name is Blacula. Just as Justin was about to be bitten, Lisa stops Mamuwalde by stabbing his voodoo doll with a wooden arrow. As she continues to stab the doll, Mamuwalde screams out in agony.

== Cast ==
- Don Mitchell as Justin Carter
- William H. Marshall as Prince Mamuwalde / Blacula
- Pam Grier as Lisa Fortier
- Michael Conrad as Lieutenant Harley Dunlop
- Janee Michelle as Gloria
- Lynn Moody as Denny
- Barbara Rhoades as Elaine
- Bernie Hamilton as Ragman
- Richard Lawson as Willis Daniels
- Craig Nelson as Sarge
- Arnold Williams as Louis
- Van Kirksey as Professor Walton
- James Kingsley as Sergeant Williams

== Release ==
Scream Blacula Scream was released theatrically in the United States by American International Pictures in June 1973. The film was released on DVD by MGM in 2004 as part of its Soul Cinema series. In 2010, the film was digitized in High Definition (1080i) and broadcast on MGM HD. In 2015, Scream Factory released the film on Blu-ray in 1080p as a double feature with Blacula.

== Reception ==
The film did not perform as well as its predecessor and drew mixed critical reviews. Roger Ebert gave the film 1.5 stars out of a possible 4. He wrote that Scream Blacula Scream "shows some evidence of having been made in a hurry with limited funds", with poor lighting, sometimes confusing camera work, and a nonsensical script. Despite these flaws, Ebert praised William Marshall for bringing a "terrifying dignity" to his role while stating that Pam Grier "has a refreshing spirit and enthusiasm." Gene Siskel gave the film 3.5 stars out of 4 and wrote "I am pleased to report that Scream, Blacula, Scream—a sequel—is better than the original. A successful sequel is a rarity, but this one doesn't come as a surprise, because the director is Bob Kelljan, the man responsible for Count Yorga, Vampire and The Return of Count Yorga, two of the most frightening horror films ever made." Kevin Thomas of the Los Angeles Times agreed that "this sequel is far superior to the original, possessing much-assured style as well as considerable humor. That's because writers Joan Torres and Raymond Koenig, aided by Maurice Jules, have turned out a more polished script and, above all, because AIP assigned Bob Kelljan, who made Count Yorga, Vampire, such a delight, to direct."

Roger Greenspun of The New York Times, however, stated that the film was "not, as the title might suggest, too much fun for anybody," writing of the performers that Kelljan "hasn't enough for them to do. It is as if the movie had completed filming without their ever having developed the shooting script." Geoff Brown of The Monthly Film Bulletin wrote that "deprived of his initial novelty, this African prince with the urbane manner and resonant voice seems indistinguishable from the common Caucasian variety [of vampire], and his adventures will excite only the most undemanding of audiences. The mixture of blaxploitation and horror does offer intriguing possibilities, but Kelljan and his screenwriters prefer to take the well-trodden path, in which fangs are dug in and screams are dragged out with depressing orthodoxy."

The 1980 book The Golden Turkey Awards "awarded" the film the distinction as the "Worst Blaxploitation Movie" of all time. In the book, authors Michael Medved and Harry Medved freely admit that they chose Scream Blacula Scream as much for the rowdy crowd at a late-night, Skid Row theater screening as for the action on-screen.

== See also ==
- Vampire films
