= Black Devil Doll from Hell =

1984 film by Chester Novell Turner

- VHS artwork for the Hollywood Home Video release
- Directed by: Chester Novell Turner
- Written by: Chester Novell Turner
- Produced by: Chester Novell Turner
- Starring: Shirley L. Jones; Gladys Ames; Bernard Brown
- Cinematography: Anna Holiday
- Edited by: Chester Novell Turner; David Ichikawa (recut)
- Music by: Chester Novell Turner
- Production company: C.N.T. Production Company
- Distributed by: Hollywood Home Video (VHS); Massacre Video (DVD)
- Release dates: 1984 (VHS); 2013 (DVD)
- Running time: 70 minutes (1984 version); 140 minutes (director's cut)
- Country: United States
- Language: English
- Budget: $8,000-$10,000

Black Devil Doll from Hell is a 1984 American blaxploitation horror film written, produced, and directed by Chester Novell Turner in his directorial debut. The film stars Shirley L. Jones as Helen, a working-class black woman, then an "unheard-of" protagonist in a genre dominated by white actors.

Widely considered a cult classic, Black Devil Doll was filmed during the 1980s boom in home video. Despite its crude, low-budget style, the "bizarre sexual tale" is frequently described as a pioneering work and Turner himself as an auteur within independent horror filmmaking and particularly African American filmmaking.

Although Turner stated he had plans for a sequel, the project never materialized. He would only go on to make one more film, Tales from the QuadeaD Zone.

== Plot ==
Helen Black is a devout, church-going Christian. Despite pressure from her friend to seek out sex, Helen is determined to abstain from sex until marriage. She also meets a man in her neighborhood who sells stolen items out of his car's trunk. Helen chastises the man for his un-Christian behavior.

One day, Helen wanders into "Road's End," a store advertising a variety of "treasures." She is intrigued by a puppet resembling a black man. The store proprietor warns Helen that the puppet comes from East India and possesses "strange powers" to satisfy its owner's desires. Helen does not believe the proprietor and purchases the puppet.

After Helen brings the puppet home, she begins to feel unusual sexual desires. She starts to believe the puppet is responsible. Soon, the puppet comes to life, attacks Helen, and sexually assaults her.

After the attack, Helen develops an insatiable drive for sex. She seeks out sex from the neighborhood thief she met earlier, and then from men at a local dance club. These lovers fail to satisfy her.

Helen returns to the puppet and begs it for sex. The puppet does not respond, and Helen threatens to destroy it. The puppet, provoked, drives Helen to madness. She collapses, bleeding and seemingly dead.

The puppet somehow returns to the store where Helen bought it, where another woman buys it and takes it home.

== Cast ==
- Shirley L. Jones as Helen Black
- Obie Dunson as Preacher
- Thalia Holloway as Second Buyer
- Jeanine Johican as Church Friend
- Ricky Roach as First Lover
- Marie Sainvilvs as Saleslady
- Chester Tankersley as Second Lover
- Kathleen Turner as Barbara's Voice
- Keefe L. Turner as The Doll

== Production ==
When Turner began working on Black Devil Doll from Hell, he initially intended the story to be one of several featured in the anthology film Tales from the QuadeaD Zone. The short was turned into a feature-length film after Turner noted that the script had grown too long to be part of an anthology. Turner wrote the script over a period of three and a half days; however, filming took place over several years on a budget of about $10,000. Most of the film's budget went towards paying the cast and crew involved with the film, as Turner was unaware that it is accepted practice for some performers and crew to work for free when making an independent film. During filming Turner began dating actress Shirley L. Jones, who would return for Turner's second film.

The titular devil doll from the movie was modeled after Rick James and Turner's young nephew portrayed the doll in walking scenes. As Turner had no prior experience in filmmaking, he took a correspondence course to help him with the film.

== Release ==
The film was first released in 1984 through Hollywood Home Video, a working relationship that Turner has described as exploitative. Black Devil Doll from Hell was distributed to video stores, and it enjoyed some popularity, but Turner only received $6 in royalties on each VHS and was not certain how many the distributor actually sold. Hollywood Home Video also made extensive edits to Turner's film, resulting in the removal of seventy minutes of footage and Turner's original soundtrack.

In 2013 Massacre Video released Black Devil Doll from Hell as part of a DVD box set along with Tales from the QuadeaD Zone. The set also featured commentary from Turner and Shirley L. Jones, a documentary on both films, and the original version of Black Devil Doll from Hell. Both Black Devil Doll from Hell and Tales from the QuadeaD Zone were screened in Austin, Texas that same year at an event hosted by the Austin Film Society and attended by both Turner and Jones.

== Reception and legacy ==
Black Devil Doll from Hell became an underground hit shortly after release, with both legal and bootleg copies distributed widely. Within only a few years, movie critics described Black Devil Doll with terms like "fabled" and "immortal," reflecting its notoriety, although opinions were split on whether the film was a successful (if low budget) horror film or an "atrocity". When the film Child's Play was released in 1988, some reviewers compared the evil doll Chucky to the doll in Turner's film.

HorrorNews.net commented that the film was "hard to recommend" but contained a good ending and "some truly unbelievable lines of dialogue". DVD Talk gave Black Devil Doll from Hell two stars, remarking that they preferred the edited cut over Turner's original version. Shock Cinema Magazine reviewed the movie in 1991, writing that "It revels unashamedly in its own misogynistic mindset and utter incompetency, and I can't imagine an uglier, more unbelievably inept piece of rotgut. Difficult to endure, impossible to forget, and loads of fun to discuss afterward (sorta like bragging about battle wounds)."

Graeme Clark from The Spinning Image panned the film, awarding it one out of ten stars, calling it "Absolutely dreadful by any estimate, but difficult to look away from (and listen to, thanks to the piercing and droning soundtrack)". In his review, Clark criticized the film's dialogue, sexual content as being "almost softcore pornographic", and called the title character "a low rent Chucky". Reviewing the 2013 release of the film, Nathaniel Thompson from Mondo Digital offered similar criticism. In his review Thompson wrote, "Love it or hate it, there's no way you'll ever forget Black Devil Doll from Hell. The monotonous (and loud) Casio soundtrack, hallucinatory pacing, profane script, and amateur performances combine to create a Black Devil Doll from Hell DIY video project so far removed from anything remotely resembling normality that most wondered how it ever escaped onto commercial VHS release at all."

A copy of the film is held in the Yale University Libraries' archives.
