= Knickerbocker Group =

The Knickerbocker Group was a somewhat indistinct group of 19th-century American writers. Its most prominent members included Washington Irving, James Fenimore Cooper and William Cullen Bryant. Each was a pioneer in general literature—novels, poetry and journalism. Humorously titled after Irving's own pen name, many others later joined the club. These include James Kirke Paulding, Fitz-Greene Halleck, Joseph Rodman Drake, Robert Charles Sands, Lydia Maria Child, Gulian Crommelin Verplanck, and Nathaniel Parker Willis, most of whom were also frequent contributors to the literary magazine The Knickerbocker.

The Knickerbocker group was established by Washington Irving in the early 19th century in New York City. Irving was one of the first Americans to earn money from being a professional writer. Irving was seen as a writing pioneer by Gilmore who said that he was "an innovator who established American writing on a new footing as a viable profession." Irving has been "hailed as the father of American literature" and Bradbury considers him to be the "pioneer of American literary Romanticism."

The group's penchant was writing heroic or epic stories in a sophisticated manner. They especially utilized parody, satire and romanticism. The Knickerbocker Group lived in New York City.

The short story The Black Vampyre has been viewed as a commentary on the Knickerbocker group, condemning them to be "vampires" that benefit on the behalf of others. The work criticizes plagiarism and authorship in the early-19th-century literary scene.

== Origins of the Group ==
In 1807, Washington Irving, his brother William Irving, and James Kirke Paulding were all involved in the publication of the Salmagundi (periodical) papers which were satirical essays centered on gossip. Aside from the Irvings and Paulding, the initial members of the group consisted of, but were not limited to, Fitz-Greene Halleck, Gulian Verplanck, James Fenimore Cooper, William Cullen Bryant and Joseph Rodman Drake. Membership into the Knickerbocker group established its group members as literary personalities in New York. In its origins, the Knickerbocker group has also been associated with the names “The Lads of Kilkenny”, (or the lads) “The Ancient Club of New York", and “The Nine Worthies.” These aliases are references to the group's artistic identity, the Bachelor aesthetic, which was considered an essential aspect of their writing style.

The Knickerbocker group was named after Irving’s pen name Diedrich Knickerbocker, which was the pseudonym he used to write works such as A History of New York, From the Beginning of the World to the End of the Dutch Dynasty (1809). The Knickerbocker magazine was a subsidiary of the group founded in 1833 by Charles Fenno Hoffman and was contributed to by many Knickerbocker group members across the early to mid 19th century. The magazine was considered by Perry Miller to be “the most influential literary organ in America” by 1840 under its editor Lewis Gaylord Clark. The magazine focused on fine arts but also included news, sketches, and editorials.

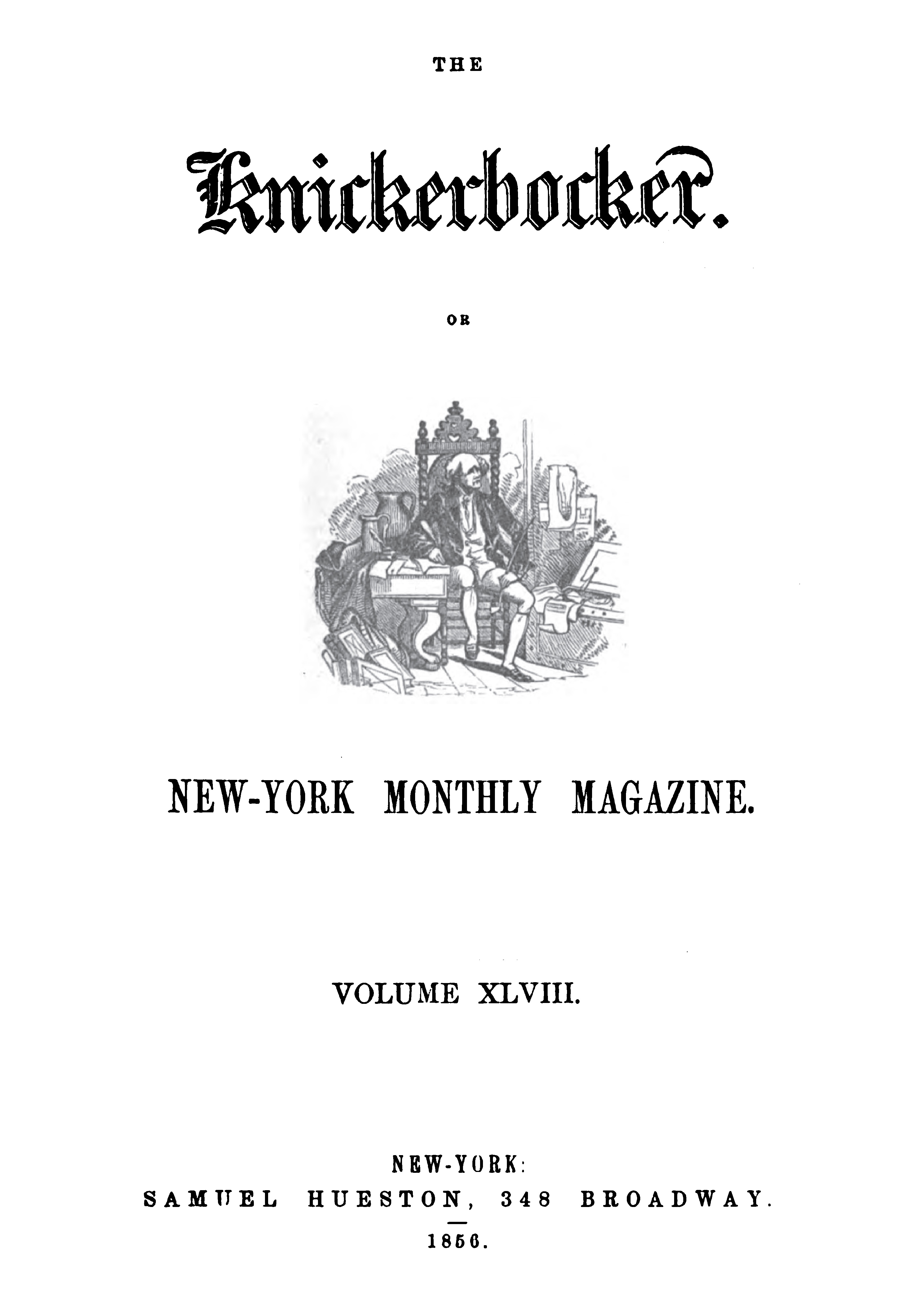
Knickerbocker Magazine Cover

Together the Knickerbocker group created many pieces of work including novels, short stories, essays, reviews, poetry, prose, and plays. It is difficult to distinguish how many works can be attributed to the group as there were numerous rotating members across the period the group was active. The Knickerbocker name expanded from only being considered a writing group to being seen as a literary movement, based in satire.

== Notable works attributed to the group ==
Irving’s first novel A History of New York, From the Beginning of the World to the End of the Dutch Dynasty was published in 1809, when he was twenty-six, under the pseudonym Diedrich Knickerbocker and is the first novel attributed to the Knickerbocker group. The full original title of this novel was A History of New-York, from the Beginning of the World to the End of the Dutch Dynasty; Containing, among Many Surprising and Curious Matters, the Unutterable Ponderings of Walter the Doubter, the Disastrous Projects of William the Testy, and the Chivalric Achievements of Peter the Headstrong—The Three Dutch Governors of New Amsterdam: Being the Only Authentic History of the Times that Ever Hath Been or Ever Will Be Published. The novel is a satirical parody of the history of New York from mock historian Deirdrich Knickerbocker (Irving). Bradley argues that Irving’s agenda in this novel is to “reclaim New York City and all New Yorkers for Holland” through revealing “the Dutch origins of a variety of “authentic” New York features.” The novel was also a critique of Irving’s historian contemporaries and historiography of the time, specifically the idea that there could be absolute historical knowledge. The novel also criticises the political situation of America at the time, specifically the theory of Jeffersonianism. The genre of the book is a mix of history and fiction which has caused it to be criticised by historians.

A History of New York, From the Beginning of the World to the End of the Dutch Dynasty was very successful, in both America and Britain, and established Irving as a prominent writer of the time. Its satirical nature makes the novel controversial and it has received a mixture of praise and criticism since its publication. At the time American reviewers praised the “humorous History of New York by Knickerbocker” and said that the satirical novel warranted “public support” and “much applause by all classes of men.”

This work is not taken seriously by some of Irving’s historian contemporaries, like William Hedges who says “the book may contain a great deal of fact but to call it history is simply to abuse the word.” Irving’s work was criticised for not being “timeless, but temporal” by Spiller and by Gilmore for belonging “to an outdated phase of culture.” Irving’s out of date historiographical techniques are critiqued by Warner who believes he engaged in an “anti-historical rhetoric of anachronism.” This criticism of Irving’s writings was apparent at the time. In 1825, William Hazlitt asserted that Irving’s writings were “literary anachronisms” Robert Ferguson describes the novel as “an attempt to annihilate the history of America”. Irving’s work is also criticised for escaping “into legend in order to avoid history” through his reliance on “literary parody, strange characters and legends” instead of favouring historical accuracy. This novel was seen to inspire other similar works of historical fiction which became popular in the 1840s.

Some of the subsequent notable works attributed to Washington Irving (under the pseudonym Diedrich Knickerbocker) include:

The Sketch Book of Geoffrey Crayon, Gent. (1819-1820)

Rip Van Winkle (1819)

The Legend of Sleepy Hollow (1820)

== Stylistic Characteristics of the Group ==
The Knickerbocker group is considered to be indistinct, however the writings and other works of the group members share similar satirical stylistic qualities. The Knickerbocker group mimicked the style of eighteenth century humour in their writing and engaged in political satire. They challenged orthodoxies at the time. The group were also aligned with literary Romanticism, which was a style emerging in Britain at the time. The Knickerbocker group is seen to have had a “profound influence on American Romanticism.” In the early nineteenth century, the Romantic literature industry was expanding due to developments in Antebellum literary culture caused by increases in production, distribution, and consumption of books and periodicals. The Knickerbocker group, led by Washington Irving was influential in transforming this industry into a profitable one by championing competitive free market ideas.

A unique satirical style was distinct to the Knickerbockers. Burstein says that all Knickerbocker writers had the same “edge” through “a mixture of sentiment and irony” which was distinctive at the time The group often wrote in the gothic style.

The identity of the Knickerbocker group was tied with the bachelor aesthetic. Within Knickerbocker writings the Bachelor aesthetic used metaphors of family and kinship as a means of explaining the political and cultural tensions of the time. Dowling says that a key aim of the Knickerbocker works was “undoing the dominant unsympathetic cultural image of bachelorhood to emphasise a communal, collaborative identity” through dismantling the notion that “the bachelor [was] politically subversive.” Dowling suggests that “a distinctive characteristic of the knickerbocker identity is a juvenile playfulness”. The Knickerbocker image was also tied to American irreverence and individualism reflected in the free agency of bachelorhood. The focus on the Bachelor identity in the Knickerbocker group is meant to be satire mocking the fraternal English order.

== Interdisciplinary Influences ==
The Knickerbocker group influenced other artistic scenes in America in the nineteenth century. The group has been noted to have had a large contribution to how modern American art is studied. Members of the group were close friends with other artists which fostered professional collaboration between this writing group and their artistic friends. William Cullen Bryant was close friends with artists Thomas Cole and Asher Brown Durand. They often featured and praised artists across their works including in magazines, travel books and novels. The group reviewed painting and sculptural gallery exhibits in their magazine, The Knickerbocker. The group used essays featuring references to the works of visual artists in order to influence their audiences to consume other facets of art. Art also influenced Knickerbocker member’s writings. Knickerbocker group members used figures of speech based on visual arts in their writings. In turn the works of Knickerbocker members were seen to inspire other artistic work.

The growing recognition and appreciation of natural landscape, architecture, historic sites, and historic preservation in America in the early nineteenth century is attributed to the Knickerbocker group. A common feature of Knickerbocker writings is an American setting, which allowed their audiences to engage in American history and culture. The writings of Knickerbocker members reached wide-ranging audiences. For example, guidebooks (published as early as 1825) contained passages taken directly, or inspired by Knickerbocker member’s writings.

== Group Dynamics ==
The Knickerbocker group was one of the first influential writing groups in America. Literary circles, like the Knickerbocker group, became a way for groups of writers to ensure their success in the market as they were tied to other successful authors. Knickerbocker writers were tied to the established success of their figurehead, Washington Irving by imitating his style of political humour and writing in the genre of the literary sketch. Washington Irving was seen to be a “commodity” in the literary market and he used his name to promote his other colleagues' works. One of the aims of the Knickerbocker group was financial success and it is argued that they focused on balancing their artistic goals with their “capitalist desire.” Washington Irving was said to be focused on how the Knickerbocker group was perceived in literary circles, and to the public, to maximise the financial success of the group. Washington Irving was also concerned with the copyright status of his works. He sent letters to British journals that reprinted his writings without consent or remuneration and hired legal counsel to protect his work in America. Their position as a writing group aided their success, as they enjoyed economic advantages that came with their group affiliation. Specifically James Fenimore Cooper and James Kirke Paulding were noted to capitalise on their affiliation with the Knickerbocker group for profit, in an attempt to boost their struggling careers by their association with Washington Irving. The Knickerbocker group were also linked to launching the careers of other successful writers at the time, like Herman Melville.
