= Adjust Your Tracking =

- Promotional release poster
- Directed by: Dan M. Kinem; Levi Peretic
- Written by: Dan M. Kinem; Levi Peretic
- Edited by: Levi Peretic
- Music by: Paul Baisley; Mayhaw Hoons
- Release date: May 24, 2013
- Running time: 84 minutes
- Country: United States
- Language: English

Adjust Your Tracking: The Untold Story of the VHS Collector is a 2013 American documentary film written and directed by Dan M. Kinem and Levi Peretic. It was released on 24 May 2013 and examines the culture of collecting VHS tapes. To raise funding for the film Kinem and Peretic launched a successful Kickstarter campaign that granted any person that donated $10 or more executive producer status, with over eighty participants donating at or above this amount. The film received a positive response.

== Synopsis ==
The documentary examines the world of VHS collecting and gives particular attention to collectors of VHS horror. Kinem and Peretic interview several collectors, many of whom state that the most sought after VHS tape is the 1987 blaxploitation film Tales from the QuadeaD Zone due to its rarity and cult status. Interviewees give their reasons for collecting and discuss forums and other venues they use to communicate with other collectors such as the online group Horror VHS Collectors.

== Release ==
The film was released on 24 May 2013, simultaneously featuring at Crypticon Seattle (24-26 May 2013) in Seattle, Washington.

For home video, VHShitfest released the film as a VHS/DVD "Big Box" combo pack, as well as a standalone 2-disc DVD release containing over 7 hours of special features. VHShitfest later commemorated the film's 10th anniversary with a Blu-ray reissue, which includes all the preexisting extras as well as new retrospectives and updates from a number of the interviewees.

== Reception ==
On the review aggregator website Rotten Tomatoes, 100% of 5 critics' reviews are positive, with an average rating of 6.9/10. LA Weekly rated the film favorably and wrote "Just as important, they don't hinge their arguments solely around nostalgia. More than just retrophiles or stubborn contrarians, AYT's talking heads -- many of whom have thousands upon thousands of tapes in their personal collections -- offer a ground-level perspective on how VHS was the first format to "take cinema out of the movie theater" and democratize the very act of watching movies." Creative Loafing and DVD Talk also reviewed the movie, the latter of which stated that it was "definitely one where your mileage will vary with your personal interest, but if it's in your wheelhouse, it's a treat."

== See also ==
- Rewind This! (2013) – "Expertly tells a comprehensive story of the rise and fall of the VHS format."
