= Tales from the QuadeaD Zone =

- Original VHS cover
- Directed by: Chester Novell Turner
- Written by: Chester Novell Turner
- Produced by: Chester Novell Turner
- Starring: Shirley Jones
- Cinematography: Chester Novell Turner
- Edited by: Chester Novell Turner
- Music by: Chester Novell Turner
- Production company: Erry Vision Film Co.
- Distributed by: BC Video (VHS); Massacre Video (DVD)
- Release dates: 1987 (VHS); 2013 (DVD)
- Running time: 62 minutes
- Country: United States
- Language: English

Tales from the QuadeaD Zone (also stylized TALES From The QuadeaD Zone) is a 1987 American anthology blaxploitation horror film written, directed, and produced by Chester Novell Turner. The film was originally released straight to VHS. VHS copies of the film have become collector's items due to the difficulty of locating them and the extremely limited quantities produced, with one copy selling for $2000 on eBay.

Turner has expressed interest in creating a sequel and began writing the film's script in 2013. Tales from the QuadeaD Zone was the only film produced by Erry Vision Film Co.

Since its release Tales From the QuadeaD Zone has received several public screenings, one of which was a 2016 symposium at the Yale University Library, Terror on Tape.

It was given a DVD release in 2013 through Massacre Video.

== Synopsis ==
The film is composed of two stories (plus a third wraparound story): "Food For ?" and "The Brothers", both of which are narrated by a mother (Shirley L. Jones) reading the tales to her deceased son Bobby. "Food For ?" centers upon a family that is so poor that they are unable to afford food for every family member. Their only solution is to get rid of some of their family in order to increase the amount of dinner for everyone else. "The Brother" follows two brothers who have hated each other their entire lives and have each made cruel jokes and attacks against the other. When one of them dies, the living brother tries to have the last laugh by stealing his brother's corpse and making him look like a circus clown. Little does he know that his brother's spirit has returned to his body, unhappy with his brother's plans.

== Cast ==
=== Food For ? ===
- W.J. Rider
- Doug Daverport
- Johnnie Tanguy
- Chris Calloway
- Kim Nichols
- Tammy Nichols
- Jeff Miza
- Ronda Rider

=== The Brothers ===
- Keefe L. Turner as Ted Johnson
- Larry Jones as Oscar
- Lawrence R. Jones as Moby
- William Jones as Fred Johnson
- Tommy L. Miller as Man in Coffin

=== Unseen Vision ===
- Shirley L. Jones as Bobby's Mother
- John W. Jones as Daryl
- Richard Tanguy as 1st Police Officer
- Dan Kugler as 2nd Police Officer
- Patrick D. Tanguy as Bobby's Voice
- Jamar E. Bankhead as Bobby

== Production ==
Work on Tales from the QuadeaD Zone began three years after Turner completed his first film, Black Devil Doll From Hell, which was initially intended to be one of the anthology's stories. Two of the film's stories, "Food For ?" and the wraparound story "Unseen Vision", were shot in Alabama while "The Brothers" was shot in Chicago.

== Release ==
As Turner released the film on his own, along with star Shirley L. Jones, Tales from the QuadeaD Zone was released in an extremely limited amount, estimated to be at or less than 100 copies. The copies were only circulated in the Chicago area due to the cost of gas and travel required by Turner and Jones and it is believed that many of these copies have been lost.

== Reception and legacy ==
Horronews.net commented that although the video could be seen as a "complete and utter train wreck", the film was made during a point in time when amateur filmmaking would be cost prohibitive for the average person and the creation of Tales from the QuadeaD Zone was evidence of Turner's "heart and a dream to become a film maker". Bloody Disgusting also reviewed the movie, stating that it was "a no-budget, SOV labor of mad love". DVD Talk reviewed the movie as part of Massacre Video's box set and gave it a poor review, which they felt was weaker than Black Devil Doll From Hell.

Over time the video achieved cult status and VHS copies became much sought after collector's items. In 2011 one copy of the film sold for $665 on the online auction site eBay, a feat that was covered in the 2013 documentary Adjust Your Tracking. The winning bidder later sold his copy of the movie for twice the amount paid.

The price reached an all time high when a copy was sold on eBay for $2000.

In 2013, Massacre Video released the movie as part of a DVD box set along with Black Devil Doll From Hell. The box set features commentary from Turner and Jackson, a documentary about both films, and the director's cut of Black Devil Doll From Hell, which upon release had been heavily edited from Turner's original version.
