= Blackenstein =

1973 film by William A. Levey

- Theatrical release poster using the poster title Black Frankenstein
- Directed by: William A. Levey
- Written by: Frank R. Saletri
- Produced by: Frank R. Saletri
- Starring: John Hart; Ivory Stone; Andrea King; Roosevelt Jackson; Joe De Sue; Nick Bolin; Liz Renay
- Cinematography: Robert Caramico
- Edited by: William A. Levey
- Music by: Cardella Di Milo; Lou Frohman; Walco Productions
- Production company: Frisco Productions Limited
- Distributed by: Prestige Pictures
- Release date: August 3, 1973
- Running time: 77 minutes 87 minutes (video release)
- Country: United States
- Language: English
- Budget: $80,000
- Box office: $2 million

Blackenstein (also known as Black Frankenstein on its theatrical release poster and whose actual on-screen title is Blackenstein the Black Frankenstein) is a 1973 American blaxploitation horror film directed by William A. Levey, and starring John Hart, Ivory Stone, Andrea King, Roosevelt Jackson, Joe De Sue, Nick Bolin and Liz Renay. It is loosely based on Mary Shelley's 1818 novel Frankenstein; or, The Modern Prometheus. Released on August 3, 1973, it was made in an attempt to cash in on the success of Blacula; released the previous year by American International Pictures. However, Blackenstein fared poorly in comparison to its predecessor, with most reviews agreeing that the film was "a totally inept mixture of the worst horror and blaxploitation films".

== Plot ==
Big and burly African American soldier Eddie Turner stepped on a land mine while serving in Vietnam and lost both arms and both legs. His physicist fiancé Doctor Winifred Walker thinks she has found help for him in her white former teacher and colleague Doctor Stein who has recently won a Nobel Prize in Physiology or Medicine for "solving the DNA genetic code".

In a tour of Doctor Stein's castle-like Los Angeles home, Winifred is introduced to his other patients: the 90-year-old Eleanor who looks to be only 50 thanks to Stein's treatments, and the bald Bruno whose lower legs have been successfully re-attached via "laser beam fusion" and Stein's "DNA solution". Winifred is startled when she sees one of Bruno's legs is tiger-striped, which Doctor Stein attributes to "an unknown RNA problem" which he hopes to correct during the course of treatment. His sinister black assistant Malcomb seems overly interested in her reaction to this sight and in her in general. Meanwhile, the stoically suffering Eddie is being verbally abused by an obnoxious white orderly at the local Veterans Hospital. When Doctors Stein and Walker arrive to ask if he would be interested in submitting to experimental limb transplant surgery that could correct his condition, he immediately consents.

Doctor Stein gives Eddie new replacement arms using his DNA solution, and Eddie seems to be recovering well until Malcomb confesses his attraction to Winifred. Winifred tries to let him down gently, explaining that she intends to marry Eddie as soon as the surgeries are complete, and Malcomb seems to accept her statement, but he later vindictively sabotages the DNA solution used during Eddie's leg surgeries with the contaminated RNA, causing the former soldier to start to devolve into a primitive brutish state with hairy hands and a Neanderthal-like brow ridge. As his condition worsens and he loses the mental capacity for speech and rational thought, the stony-faced Eddie becomes a slow, shambling monster resembling an African American version of the iconic Boris Karloff Frankenstein Monster with a squarish Afro instead of the usual scars and neck bolts. Although he lies in a near-catatonic state by day, compelled by horrible cannibalistic urges, the black suit and polo neck-clad Eddie secretly leaves the house late each night in search of victims whom he dismembers, disembowels and devours zombie-style, always returning in time each morning for his ongoing schedule of DNA injections with his doctors none the wiser.

Two police detectives visit Doctor Stein as the body count starts to rise (their suspicions aroused due to the fact that all the killings took place in the surrounding vicinity and that the abusive hospital orderly was the vengeful Eddie's first victim), but Stein is ignorant of the fact that there is now a murderous monster living in his basement laboratory. Winifred, however, has become suspicious of Malcomb and spends her time in the lab, examining the various solutions used during Eddie's surgery. One night, returning from his usual senseless rampage, Eddie hears screaming coming from Winifred's room. He enters to find Malcomb at her bedside and interrupts the attempted rape. Malcomb grabs a gun and empties it into the unaffected Eddie as Winifred flees. Eddie strangles Malcomb and then goes on to kill Bruno and Eleanor, the latter aging rapidly as she dies. Doctor Stein meets Winifred on the stairs, where she tells him Eddie is the monster. Together they run down to the lab.

Winifred busies herself preparing an injection of the DNA solution that she hopes will cure Eddie. When Eddie draws near, he seems moved by her terror and backs away, perhaps dimly remembering that she is his fiancé. Doctor Stein, however, attacks him from behind, provoking a violent response. After a brief tussle with his creator that ends with Stein being fatally knocked into the high voltage electrical equipment, Eddie leaves the house. The police arrive too late to stop Eddie, but discover Doctor Stein's dead body and console Winifred.

Eddie finds a brunette attempting to start a Jeep and spends several long minutes chasing her around an empty industrial warehouse. The police call in the Los Angeles County Canine Corps, and the Doberman Pinschers surround Eddie, knock him to the ground and, with a fittingly macabre irony, viciously tear the monster to pieces in the same way he killed his victims.

== Cast ==
- John Hart as Dr. Stein
- Ivory Stone as Dr. Winifred Walker
- Joe De Sue as Eddie Turner / Blackenstein
- Roosevelt Jackson as Malcomb
- Andrea King as Eleanor
- Nick Bolin as Bruno Stragor
- Karin Lind as Hospital Supervisor
- Yvonne Robinson as Hospital Receptionist
- Liz Renay as Blonde Murder Victim
- Don Brodie as Police Lieutenant

== Filming and development ==
Filming was done predominantly around the Greater Los Angeles area during October 1972. The opening sequence features the Hollywood Burbank Airport. Doctor Stein's castle was filmed at Villa de Leon in Pacific Palisades with exterior/interior shots filmed on location and Griffith Park was used for the monster's nonsensical killing spree and demise.

According to director William A. Levey, non-actor Joe De Sue was cast in the title role because he was a client of criminal lawyer turned writer/producer Frank R. Saletri, as was celebrity cult icon Liz Renay who plays one of the monster's victims.

Saletri also wrote, produced and directed the never-released blaxploitation horror film Black the Ripper and wrote the screenplays for two unmade Sherlock Holmes films, Sherlock Holmes in the Adventures of the Werewolf of the Baskervilles and Sherlock Holmes in the Adventures of the Golden Vampire, the latter of which was to star Alice Cooper as Dracula. In 1982 Saletri was found murdered "gangland style" in his home, a mansion formerly owned by Bela Lugosi.

== Other appearances ==
- Blackenstein has appeared in skits on Saturday Night Live.
  - In a 2011 episode hosted by Jesse Eisenberg, "The Essentials" segment showed the movie Bride of Blackenstein where Dr. Blackenstein (portrayed by Jay Pharoah) creates a bride (portrayed by Nicki Minaj) for Blackenstein's Monster (portrayed by Kenan Thompson). Unfortunately, it becomes sassy because Igor (portrayed by Jesse Eisenberg) got the parts that caused this personality like the brain of a female DMV employee who just died, the fingernails of a cashier at Walgreens, and the lips of a "ho who didn't know her place" as she described herself when Dr. Blackenstein felt offended at that answer at first. The Bride of Blackenstein wants Blackenstein's Monster to take her out to dinner if she wants to become an official bride. When the angry mob attacks the castle, the Bride of Blackenstein talks off the mob leaders (portrayed by Bill Hader and Kristen Wiig). After the angry mob leaves, the Bride of Blackenstein claims the castle and states that her aunt is coming and needs a room close to the bathroom due to her broken foot. Then she, Blackenstein's Monster, and Dr. Blackenstein sing her theme song as Igor claps along.
- Blackenstein has appeared on Mad TV where he was re-dubbed "Funkenstein".
- The movie was referenced in the 2003 South Korean film Save the Green Planet!.
- Blackenstein is given a scholarly examination as an aspect of a larger cultural perspective in Elizabeth Young's Black Frankenstein: The Making of an American Metaphor published in 2009 as part of the America and the Long 19th Century series from New York University Press.
- On the Simpsons Season 9 episode "Simpson Tide" (1998), Homer Simpson is watching TV at home after getting fired (yet again), when an announcer says, "Next, on Exploitation Theater: Blacula, followed by Blackenstein, and The Blunchblack of Blotre Blame."

== Home video ==
Blackenstein was first released on video in the late 1970s by Media Home Entertainment and again on VHS and DVD by Xenon Pictures in 2003. Severin Films released it on Blu-ray on May 30, 2017; fully restored, it features two versions of the film: the theatrical release, which runs for 78 minutes, and the home video release that lasts 87 minutes. Extras include the original theatrical trailer, as well as numerous interviews.

== See also ==
- List of films featuring Frankenstein's monster
