= The Black Vampyre =

1819 short story

The Black Vampyre; A Legend of St. Domingo
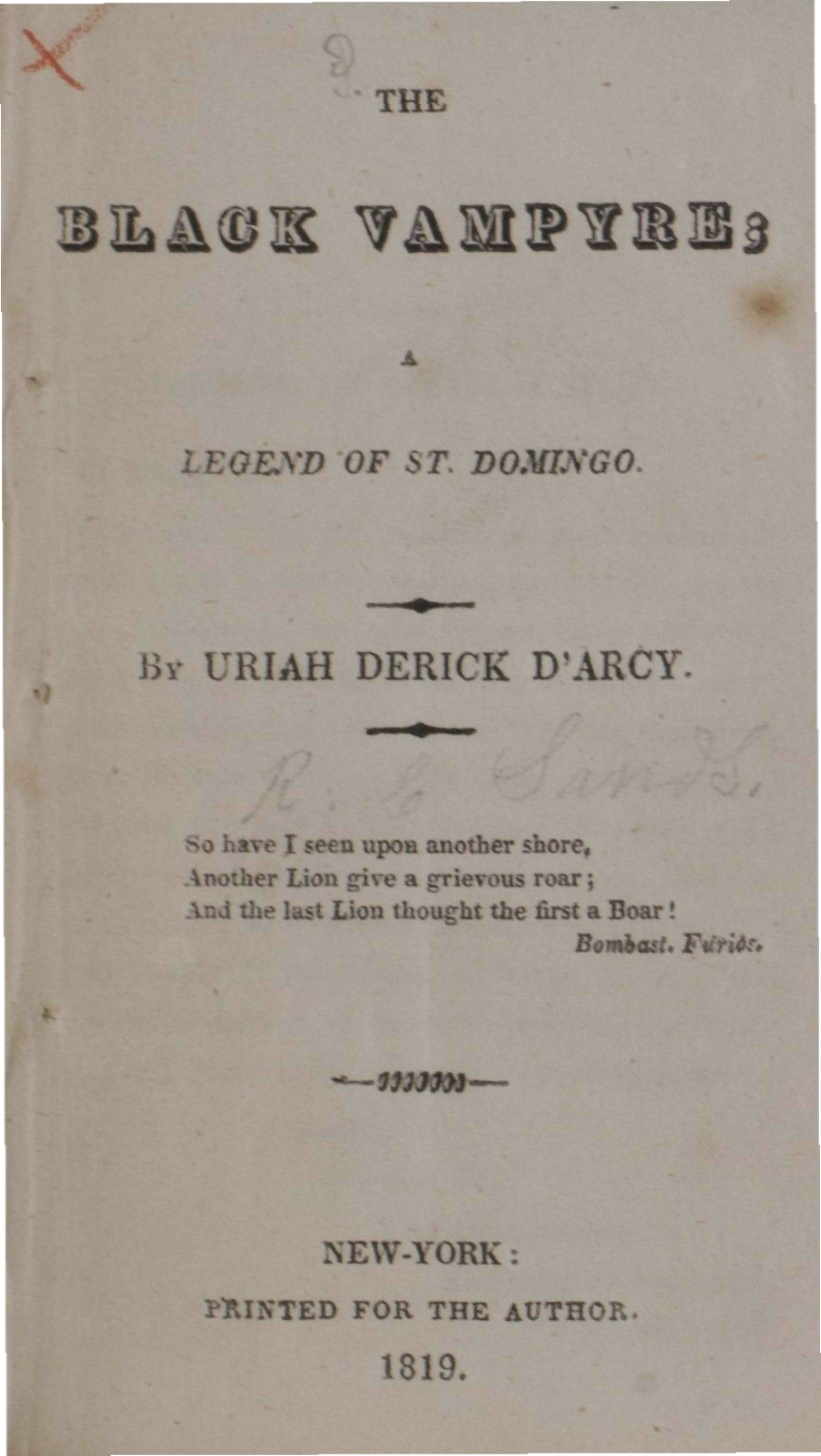
- The front (first) page of the second edition
- Author: Uriah Derick D'Arcy
- Language: English
- Published: 1819
- Pages: 112 (2020 edition)
- ISBN: 9781914090004

The Black Vampyre; A Legend of St. Domingo is an American novella published in 1819 by the pseudonymous Uriah Derick D'Arcy. It is credited as "the first black vampire story, the first comedic vampire story, the first story to include a mulatto vampire, the first vampire story by an American author, and perhaps the first anti-slavery short story." The Black Vampyre tells the story of a black slave, who is resurrected as a vampire after being killed by his captor; the slave seeks revenge on his captor and achieves it by stealing the captor's son and marrying the captor's wife. D'Arcy sets the story against the conditions that led to the Haitian Revolution.

== Plot summary ==
The novel opens with Mr. Anthony Gibbons recalling his family history. He begins his recollection with his ancestors leaving Guinea on a French ship and arriving in St. Domingo, where they are sold into slavery. They all die shortly after being sold, with the exception of one small boy who is sold to Mr. Personne. Mr. Personne kills the boy and throws the body into the ocean, but the body washes ashore and rises in the moonlight. Mr. Personne tries to kill the boy again, deciding to burn the boy in a pyre. Instead, the boy tosses Mr. Personne into the fire, resulting in Mr. Personne becoming badly scarred.

Mr. Personne regains consciousness in his own bed, and he is wrapped in bandages. He calls out for his wife, Euphemia, and his infant son. She informs him that there was nothing left of their son but his skin, hair, and nails. After hearing of his son's death, Mr. Personne also dies.

Euphemia marries two more times. Her second and third marriages were to Mr. Marquand and Mr. Dubois respectively. While mourning the death of Dubois, she is approached by a colored Moorish Prince character, who is led in hand by Zembo, a European boy. Euphemia is enamored by the Prince, and she quickly marries him despite the chaplain's resistance.

Following their wedding, at midnight, the Prince takes Euphemia to her family graveyard. The Prince and Zembo dig up her son's grave. The Prince uses the blood from her son's heart to fill a golden goblet, which he then forces Euphemia to drink from. The Prince tells Euphemia that she is not allowed to tell anyone what happened in the graveyard. Euphemia faints, and she wakes up in her first husband's grave, only to find out that she has become a vampire.

Then, the Prince raises all three of her past husbands from the dead. Mr. Marquand and Mr. Dubois duel, which ends with Zembo and the Prince driving a stake into the two men. The Prince assures Euphemia that her second and third husbands cannot be resurrected again. Then the Prince forgives Mr. Personne for attempting to kill him when he was a boy, revealing that he was the survivor of the drowning and burning from the French slave ship. As a sign of good will, the Prince presents Zembo as Mr. Personne's dead son and explains that Zembo's education has been taken care of.

With instructions from the Prince to journey to Europe, the group stops at a cave where there is a vampyre ball taking place. Inside the cave, there are countless armed slaves listening to the Vampyre monarchs. The monarchs believe that the immortals existed before the mortals and that all the various immortals should rally and take up arms in the name of emancipation. It is also revealed that the only way to kill a vampyre is by using a stake or giving them a cure. However, before any action can be taken, the group is attacked by soldiers, and everyone is killed, except for Mr. Personne and Euphemia.

Both Mr. Personne and Euphemia take the cure and become human again. As a side effect, Mr. Personne ends up sixteen years younger than his wife. Zembo emerges alive, revealing that he was the one who gave the soldiers information on where to find them and how to kill the vampyres. As a reward, he is renamed Barabbas and baptized. Euphemia is revealed to be pregnant with the Prince's son, a mulatto.

In the present day, Mr. Anthony Gibbons is revealed to be the lineal descendant of the Prince's son. Gibbons is also revealed to have bowel troubles, which he fears could be his cravings as a vampyre.

== Characters ==
In order of appearance:

- Mr. Anthony Gibbons is the lineal descendant of Euphemia and the Prince, who resides in New Jersey. He experiences cravings due to him being part vampyre.
- The Prince is a former slave from Guinea and a vampyre. Mr. Personne attempts to kill him through different means, but none ever work. He kidnaps Personne's son, raising him as Zembo. He returns many years later, and seduces and marries Euphemia. He also resurrects Euphemia's three husbands, killing two of them. He is betrayed by Zembo and killed at the ball.
- Mr. Personne is a slave captor, who owns and attempts to kill the Prince as a child. He is badly burned when his plan to burn the vampyre backfires, and he later dies when told his son has died. He is resurrected by the Prince and turned into a vampyre along with his wife, Euphemia. He cures himself along with his wife and returns to being human.
- Euphemia is the wife of Mr. Personne, who later marries twice more before marrying the Prince. Her last three husbands are dead, but they are resurrected by the Prince. She is turned into a vampyre by the Prince, but takes the cure upon his death and returns to being human. She becomes pregnant with the Prince's son.
- Zembo is the Prince's page, and the son of Euphemia and Mr. Personne. He is raised by the Prince. He informs the raiding soldiers where to find the vampyres and how to kill them. As a reward, he is baptized with the name Barabbas.
- Mr. Marquand and Mr. Dubois are the second and third husbands (respectively) of Euphemia, who are raised and killed by the Prince and Zembo.

== Historical and literary context ==
Critics debate The Black Vampyre to be the first American vampire story, but they agree that it is the first black vampire story. Scholars have also noted the text's proximity to the Haitian Revolution, a period of civil unrest in Haiti from 1791 to 1804 . In The Black Vampyre, D'Arcy draws a correlation between vampirism, Haitian obeah practices, and the Haitian slave revolution. There are other texts from the nineteenth century that look at monstrous, or inhuman, characters and their ties to the Haitian revolution. In Sarah Juliet Lauro's introduction to The Transatlantic Zombie, Lauro denotes a similar correlation between a monstrous creature and slave revolts in the Haitian Revolution, noting that "the Haitian zombie is in itself a representation of the people's history—as slaves and as slaves in revolt."

In the nineteenth-century, there was an emergence of fiction writing centered around monstrous creatures and the undead. "...Mary Shelley's Frankenstein also gave rise to vampire stories by both Dr. J. Polidori and Lord Byron," and the vampire story referenced by J. Polidori is directly linked to the history of The Black Vampyre . The New Monthly Magazine in London published "The Vampyre: A Tale by Lord Byron" in April 1819, but it was later revealed that the text's true author was John William Polidori. "The Vampyre," by John Polidori, was first published in April 1819. The Black Vampyre is thought by some scholars to be a text written in response, benefiting from "The Vampyre"'s popularity.

The Black Vampyre has also been viewed as a commentary on the Knickerbocker Group, condemning them to be "vampires" that benefit at the expense of others. The work criticizes plagiarism and authorship in the early-19th-century literary scene.

== Critical reception ==
While many early nineteenth-century writers were interested in race and religion, their audiences were entranced by scandalous works. Critics tend to compare The Black Vampyre to The Vampyre, a short story by John William Polidori due to the way that it references Lord Byron's "The Giaour." The Black Vampyre is stated to be "an American response" to Polidori's work. Stemming from that, critics find that the story mixes American with African traditions, noting that the text takes from obeah practice, specifically with the "fetish oath and the use of narcotic potions to make the living seem dead." The story "draws on this obeah literature to enmesh it with vampirism," mixing the convention with vampirism. Some critics noted this to feature "what is probably the second English-language prose vampire." Critics also debate the ambiguity of the story. One example listed by Duncan Faherty is the vampiric nature of Zembo and whether he is a vampire or not; this is often debated among critics with some noting that regardless, "most children appearing in nineteenth-century literature were victims."

== Allusions and literary references ==
Throughout the text, there are multiple classical allusions (including references to the Bible, Greek/Roman mythology, and Renaissance authors), as well as contemporary allusions (including references to plays, poetry, and short stories).

The story starts off with a letter from D'Arcy to the author of "Wall-Street," and hopes that both of them will be remembered in the Auction room of the Temple of the Muses. Wall-Street is a play with an unknown author. It is set in New York City and centers on the theme of finances.

After throwing a slave boy in the ocean and witnessing him rising back up, Mr. Personne is afraid. During this description, there are three lines (192–194) from Book 1 of Lucan's De Bello Civili or Pharsalia. These lines are written in the original Latin. Another reference to the Antiquity occurs when Mr. Personne is tossed into the pyre, and the narrative compares him to Hercules. This is a reference to Book 9 of Metamorphoses by Ovid, in which Hercules puts Lichas in a pyre and burns away his mortal body. Later on in the text, when Euphemia meets the Prince, she notices that he is both beautiful like Helen and ugly like Medusa.

Renaissance authors are invoked as well. In the novel, when Mr. Personne plans on sacrificing the slave boy to Moloch, in which the footnote references Moloch as a fallen angel from Paradise Lost by John Milton. There is also a line from Two Gentlemen of Verona by Shakespeare during Euphemia's first encounter with the Prince.

== Themes ==
=== Mixture ===
Throughout the text, the mixture of blood appears in many different forms, one being the physical breaching of Euphemia's skin by the Prince. Another example is when Euphemia "gives birth to the mixed-race and half-vampire child of her later husband, the prince." The child then goes on to New Jersey, mixing Haitian, African, and American cultures with religion. In The Black Vampyre, there is a concern with a mixture of races, personified in the birth of the mixed-race son of the Black Vampyre. "…it also introduces a new, mixed-race, vampiric baby…" At this point in American history, both politicians and literary authors were commenting on this social concern of racial mixture and purity. Former American president, Thomas Jefferson, wrote several pieces that discussed racial mixture, such as his Notes on the State of Virginia.

=== Vampirism ===
The vampire concept was "beginning to appear as a metaphor for economic or exploitation." D'Arcy makes slavery central in his work "by making his titular vampire black and specifically an African brought to New World enslavement." The prince is a vampire and typically vampires are immortal beings with sharp fangs that they use to suck the blood of their victims, and they then turn the victim into their follower. Very common powers that vampires share in stories are that they have immense strength and a hypnotic (sometimes sensual) control over their victims' minds. The Prince displays a few of these characteristics, such as blood-sucking and hypnotic control over Euphemia. Some critics note that the vampyres are revolting against capitalism, noting: "The developing dorms of capitalism are emphatically linked with both the vampire sucking life from the living and the horror of dead-but-undead institutions...reflecting too on the ostensibly rational origins of the United States that have promoted a different turn to mythology and monstrosity." The close cousins of the vampyre is the zombie, "'whom slaves of West African descent are said to have believed were "returned soul[s], revenant[s]," a word that appears as early as 1797 in travel writing about St. Domingue" which is "the quintessential monster of plantation slavery: it “represents, responds to, and mystifies fear of slavery, collusion with it, and rebellion against it." Like the zombie, the vampyre is connected to a "colonial and post-colonial history of oppression."

=== Religion ===
Connecting the story to its Haitian cultural origins, many of the characters were from Central Africa, which had been Catholic for "a quarter millennium prior to the Haitian Revolution, and that they were thus possessed of a collective religious habitus that esteemed both Catholic saints and the spiritual beings and ancestors of traditional African religion as central to their quotidian existence and religious life." The story itself contains a mixture of biblical references and allusions with mythological references. D'Arcy connects vampirism with Haitian obeah practices, and the acts of being a vampire to that of mythological figures like Hercules. The name Barabbas "recalls the criminal who was freed in Jesus’s place; like the biblical Barabbas, Zembo is saved from death-but, ironically, only by a detour into vampirism...even as the text uses names to give authority to some characters, it also uses the Personnes’ allegorical names to imply that this story could have happened to any planter in St. Domingue and that it, at least in part, repeats familiar stories."

== Author ==
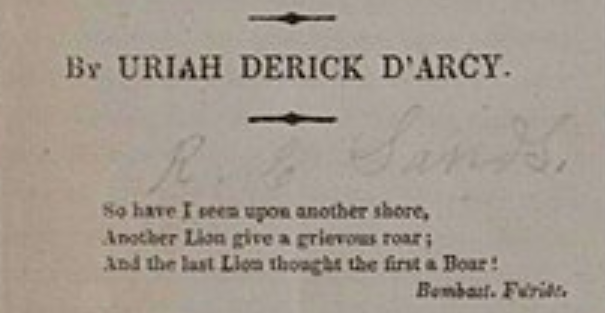
Detail of the front (first) page of the second edition which shows a possible author signature.

The text was originally published under the known literary pseudonym, Uriah Derick D'Arcy. An 1845 reprinting of the text by The Knickerbocker attributed the work to Robert C. Sands, a writer of the magazine along with Lydia Maria Child, author of "The Quadroons." However, some critics remain convinced that the true author is Richard Varick Dey, a fellow Columbia graduate of Sands'. Dey was born on January 11, 1801, and attended Theological Seminary in New Brunswick in 1822. During his time as a reverend, the overseer of the Congregational church in Greenfield Hill, Connecticut and the pastor of the Reformed Church in Vandewater Street, New York City.

== Publication history ==
The Black Vampyre had two editions printed in the United States in 1819. On June 21, 1819, the New York Daily Advertiser announced the publication of The Black Vampyre and marketed sales began two days later on June 23, 1819. The second edition was published two months later on August 30, 1819.

== See also ==
- Clotel
- Vampire literature
- Blacula
