= Rosalind Cash =

American actress (1938–1995)

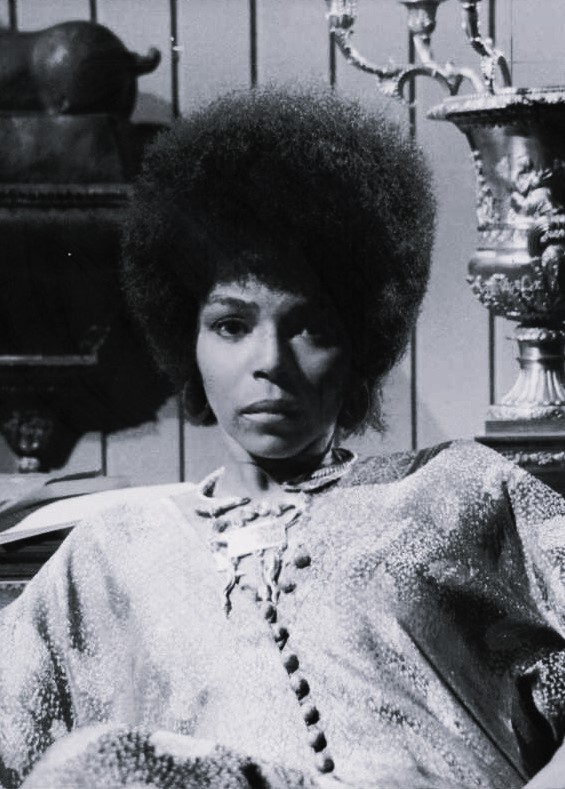
- Cash in 1971
- Born: December 31, 1938; Atlantic City, New Jersey, U.S.
- Died: October 31, 1995 (aged 56); Los Angeles, California, U.S.
- Education: City College of New York
- Occupation: Actress
- Years active: 1962–1995

Rosalind Cash (December 31, 1938 – October 31, 1995) was an American actress. Her best-known film role is in the 1971 science-fiction film The Omega Man. Cash also had another notable role as Mary Mae Ward in ABC's General Hospital, a role she portrayed from 1994 until her death in 1995.

== Biography ==
=== Early life and education ===
Cash was the second of four children born in Atlantic City, New Jersey, to John O. Cash Sr., a clerk, and Martha Elizabeth Cash. Her siblings were John Jr., Robert, and Helen. Cash graduated with honors from Atlantic City High School in 1956. After high school, Cash attended City College of New York. Her career extended to theater, television, film, and recording.

=== Career ===
Cash appeared in the 1962 revival of Fiorello! and was an original member of the Negro Ensemble Company, founded in 1968. In 1973, Cash played the role of Goneril in King Lear at the New York Shakespeare Festival alongside James Earl Jones's Lear. Cash appeared on the New York-area television show Callback!, which featured musical director Barry Manilow. The episode on which Cash was featured was filmed on March 31, 1969, at the Village Gate in New York City. The episode aired on Saturday, April 19, 1969 at 3:30 pm on CBS. Cash performed "God Bless the Child" on the show. No recordings of the performance are known to exist. Her other television credits include The Cosby Show, What's Happening!!, A Different World, Good Times, The Mary Tyler Moore Show, Frank's Place, Kojak, Barney Miller, Benson, Roc, Police Woman, Family Ties, Head of the Class, The Golden Girls, and L.A. Law.

Cash was nominated for an Emmy Award for her work on the Public Broadcasting Service production of Go Tell It on the Mountain. In 1996, she was posthumously nominated for an Emmy Award, Outstanding Supporting Actress in a Drama Series, for her role on General Hospital. Cash's films included Omega Man (1971), Klute (1971), The New Centurions (1972) with George C. Scott and Stacy Keach, Uptown Saturday Night (1974) with Bill Cosby and Sidney Poitier, and Wrong Is Right (1982). In 1995, she appeared in Tales from the Hood, her last film appearance.

Cash supplied the voices of Sesame Street Muppet Roosevelt Franklin's mother and his sister, Mary Frances, on the 1970 record album The Year of Roosevelt Franklin, Gordon's Friend from Sesame Street alongside Matt Robinson's voices for Roosevelt and his brother, Baby Ray, and friend, A.B. Cito.

== Personal life and death ==
Cash never married nor had children. She died of cancer on October 31, 1995, at Cedars-Sinai Medical Center in Los Angeles, California, aged 56.

== Filmography ==
Year	Title	Role	Notes
1961	The Hustler	Waitress	Uncredited
1971	Klute	Pat	
1971	The Omega Man	Lisa	
1972	The New Centurions (also known as Precinct 45: Los Angeles Police)	Lorrie	
1972	Melinda	Terry Davis	
1972	Hickey & Boggs	Nyona	
1973	The All-American Boy	Poppy	
1974	King Lear (TV series)	Goneril	
1974	Uptown Saturday Night	Sarah Jackson	
1974	Amazing Grace	Creola Waters	
1975	Ceremonies in Dark Old Men	Adele	TV movie
1975	Cornbread, Earl and Me (also known as Hit the Open Man)	Sarah Robinson	
1976	Dr. Black, Mr. Hyde (also released as Dr. Black and Mr. White; The Watts Monster)	Dr. Billie Worth	
1976	The Monkey Hu$tle	Mama	
1974	The Mary Tyler Moore Show (episode "A Girl Like Mary")	Enid Berringer	TV
1976	Good Times	Jessica Bishop	TV series
1976–1977	What's Happening!!	Loretta	TV series
1977	Starsky & Hutch (Episode: "The Crying Child")	Sgt. Sheila Peterson	TV
1977	A Killing Affair (also known as Behind the Badge)	Beverly York	TV movie
1978	The Class of Miss MacMichael	Una Ferrar	
1978	Death Drug	Doctor	
1978	Barney Miller (episode "Dog Days")	Carol Slade	TV
1979	Flashpoint	–	TV movie
1980	Guyana Tragedy: The Story of Jim Jones (also known as The Mad Messiah)	Jenny Hammond	TV movie
1981	Benson (Episode: "Rainbow's End")	Elizabeth	TV
1981	The Sophisticated Gents	Christine Jackson	TV series
1981	Keeping On		TV movie
1982	Wrong Is Right (also known as The Man with the Deadly Lens)	Mrs. Ford	
1982	Sister, Sister	Freida Lovejoy-Burton	TV movie
1983	Special Bulletin	Frieda Barton	TV movie
1983	This Is the Life	Herself	TV series
1983	Just an Overnight Guest		TV short
1984	The Adventures of Buckaroo Banzai Across the 8th Dimension	John Emdall	
1985	Go Tell It on the Mountain	Florence	TV movie
1986	Knight Rider (episode "Voo Doo Knight")	Harana	TV
1986	The Cosby Show (Episode: "Denise Gets a D")	Dr. Hughes	TV
1987	The Mighty Pawns	Mrs. Robinson	TV movie
1987	From a Whisper to a Scream	Snake Woman	
1987	Highway to Heaven (episode "A Song of Songs")	Ellie Livingston	TV
1988	The Golden Girls (episode "Mixed Blessings")	Lorraine	TV
1988	Death Spa (also known as Witch Bitch)	Sgt. Stone	
1989	Forced March		
1989	Family Ties (two-part episode "All in the Neighborhood")	Maya Thompson	TV
1989	A Different World (episodes "To Have and Have Not" and "Under One Roof")	Dean Hughes	TV
1992	You Must Remember This (also known as Wonderworks: You Must Remember This)	Janet Mickens	TV movie
1992	The Second Coming		Short
1993	The Fresh Prince of Bel-Air	Mrs. Bassin	TV series
1994–1995	General Hospital	Mary Mae Ward	TV series
1995	A Dangerous Affair	Dr. Robertson	TV movie
1995	Tales from the Hood	Dr. Cushing	
1996	Circle of Pain		Final film role; TV movie, released posthumously
