= Maurie (film) =

1973 film by Daniel Mann

- Directed by: Daniel Mann
- Written by: Douglas Morrow
- Produced by: Douglas Morrow; Frank Ross
- Starring: Bernie Casey; Bo Svenson; Bill Walker; Maidie Norman; Ji-Tu Cumbuka
- Cinematography: John Hora
- Edited by: Walter Hannemann
- Music by: Joe Raposo
- Production company: Ausable Films
- Distributed by: National General Pictures
- Release date: August 1, 1973
- Running time: 113 minutes
- Country: United States
- Language: English

Maurie (also known as Big Mo) is a 1973 American biographical drama film directed by Daniel Mann. Distributed by National General Pictures, the film covers the lives and relationship of two NBA Hall of fame basketball players, the forward Jack Twyman, and his teammate the forward Maurice Stokes.

== Plot summary ==
The film chronicles Twyman's and Stokes's relationship from Stokes's rookie year in the NBA up until his death. Stokes and Twyman are teammates on the Rochester Royals during the 1950s (during which time the team relocates to Cincinnati). Stokes falls ill three days after the last game of the 1957–58 NBA season, in Minneapolis. In that final game, Stokes had driven to the basket, drew contact and fell to the floor, hit his head, and was knocked unconscious. He was revived with smelling salts, and he returned to the game.

Three days later, after an opening-round playoff game against the Detroit Pistons, Stokes becomes ill during the team's flight back to Cincinnati, suffers a seizure and falls into a coma. He awakens in a Cincinnati hospital three weeks later. Stokes never fully recovers from the brain injury, and is left permanently paralyzed. He is confined to bed or a wheelchair as an almost completely paralyzed quadraplegic, and needs constant nursing care.

Twyman offers his friendship and continuous moral support and financial aid to Stokes and his family (even legally adopting him). Stokes dies from a heart attack in 1970.

== Cast ==
The film starred then-newcomer actor Bernie Casey (a former NFL player) as Stokes, and the Swedish actor Bo Svenson as Twyman.

=== Supporting cast ===
The cast included actors Bill Walker and Maidie Norman as Maurice's parents; Janet MacLachlan played Stokes's college girlfriend, Dorothy (Stokes was carrying a diamond ring in his pocket, all set to propose to her, when he had the seizure on the plane); and actor Ji-Tu Cumbuka portrayed Oscar Robertson.

== Music ==
The song "Winners", composed by Joe Raposo was performed by African-American singer Arthur Prysock . In October 1973, Frank Sinatra included a version of the song on his LP Ol' Blue Eyes Is Back.

== Reception ==
=== Critical response ===
Film critic A. H. Weiler of The New York Times wrote in his review: "As a potentially inspirational saga that respects the awesome truth that generated it, Maurie, now at Loews State and Cine Theaters is, unfortunately, rarely moving as drama. The heroism, tragedy and friendship of Maurice Stokes, the black basketball star destined to die, and his white teammate, Jack Twyman, formerly of the Cincinnati Royals, evolves on screen with largely soap-opera effects."

== See also ==
- Brian's Song
- List of American films of 1973
- List of basketball films
- Twyman–Stokes Teammate of the Year Award
