= William Crain (filmmaker) =

American film and television director

- Born: June 20, 1949 (age 76); Columbus, Ohio, U.S.
- Occupation: Film director
- Notable work: Blacula; Dr. Black, Mr. Hyde

William Crain (born June 20, 1949) is an American film and television director. He was one of the first black filmmakers from a major film school to achieve commercial success.

Crain was born in Columbus, Ohio. A graduate of UCLA's film school, Crain, unlike many of the "L.A. Rebellion" filmmakers who made films of a deeply personal or political nature, made work consisting almost entirely of mainstream and genre-driven works. Throughout the 1970s, he directed TV shows and movies.

In 1972, at the age of 23, he directed Blacula. While largely ignored by critics, the film has become somewhat of a cult favorite and made a name for actor William Marshall, who played the title character. Crain did other films and then returned to TV show installments, which he continues to do today.

Many sources confuse him with another Bill/William Crain who produced educational short films in the 1970s and directed Mirage (1990) and Midnight Fear (1991).

== Filmography ==
- Brother John (1971) (intern)
- Blacula (1972) (director)
- Dr. Black, Mr. Hyde (1976) (director)
- Nothing as It Seems (2016) (director)
