= Charles Macaulay =

American film director (1927–1999)

- Born: September 26, 1927
- Died: August 13, 1999 (aged 71)

Charles Macaulay (September 26, 1927 – August 13, 1999) was an American actor and director.

== Early life ==
He was born and raised in Kentucky.

== Education and career ==
He was trained at the Royal Academy of Dramatic Art in London and on graduating won the First Judges Medal with notes of congratulation from John Gielgud and John Mills for his performance in The Heiress.

In 1952 he made his first appearance in New York in The Sacred Flame by W. Somerset Maugham.

He worked on the east coast for a number of years, appearing in six off-Broadway productions as well as seven Broadway productions as well as Barter Theatre opposite Judith Anderson. He also appeared in live TV shows such as Armstrong Circle Theatre and Studio One.

On stage, he appeared in Man and Superman, The Winslow Boy, Bell, Book and Candle, and The Dark Is Light Enough.

He also acted in Shakespeare's plays and played Benedick in Much Ado About Nothing and the title role in Macbeth at the Old Globe Theatre in San Diego.

=== Perry Mason ===
He was part of the Perry Mason TV film series, initially playing a judge, then District Attorney Markham. He was a friend of Raymond Burr and was an administrator of his estate.

=== Other TV roles ===
He appeared in the original run of Star Trek, Mission: Impossible, Gunsmoke, Airport 77, Baa Baa Black Sheep and Columbo.

== Academia ==
He taught at the USC School of Theatre from 1986 to 1992, directing six student productions.

== Death ==
He died of metastatic cancer in Sonoma County at the age of 72 in 1999.
