= Tansy (disambiguation) =

The tansy is a plant.

Tansy may also refer to:

- Tansy beetle (Chrysolina graminis), a species of leaf beetle which feeds on tansy
- Tansy cakes, medieval English dessert
- Tansy Davies (born 1973), British composer
- Tansy Rayner Roberts (born 1978), Australian fantasy writer
- Tansy Saylor, a main character in Conjure Wife, a supernatural horror novel by Fritz Leiber
  - Tansy Taylor, in the film adaptation Night of the Eagle
- Teton River (Montana), also known as the Tansy River
- Tansy (film), a 1921 British silent drama
