= Marlene Clark =

American actress and fashion model (1937–2023)

- Clark c. 1970s
- Born: December 19, 1937; New York City, New York, U.S. or Los Angeles, California, U.S. (sources differ)
- Died: May 18, 2023 (aged 85); Los Angeles, California, U.S.
- Occupations: Actress; animator; fashion model
- Years active: 1968–1988
- Known for: Janet Lawson – Sanford and Son; Ganja Meda – Ganja & Hess
- Spouse: Billy Dee Williams (m. 1968; div. 1971)

Marlene Clark (December 19, 1937 – May 18, 2023) was an American actress, animator, and fashion model. Clark was best known for her portrayals of Ganja Meda in the 1973 horror film Ganja & Hess and Janet Lawson, Lamont's girlfriend in the sitcom Sanford and Son from its fifth season in 1975 until the series conclusion in 1977.

== Early life ==
Born on December 19, 1937, in New York City, or Los Angeles (sources differ), Clark was raised in the Harlem section of New York. Before her career in acting, Clark was a fashion model.

== Career ==
Of the films Clark appeared in during the 1960s include For Love of Ivy (1968), starring Sidney Poitier, and Putney Swope (1969), which was directed by Robert Downey Sr. Clark appeared in Hal Ashby's directorial debut The Landlord (1970). Bill Gunn, who wrote the screenplay of The Landlord, then cast her in his unreleased film, Stop! (1970). Clark also appeared opposite Jim Brown and Stella Stevens in Slaughter (1972). The same year, Clark was also in Night of the Cobra Woman (1972).

Clark collaborated with Gunn again when he cast her and Duane Jones in the 1973 horror film Ganja & Hess. A.H. Weiler of The New York Times wrote in his review of the film, "Miss Clark is an arresting presence as the enamored Ganja. Also, she occasionally invests an unbelievable character with style and humor." That same year, Clark also appeared in the Bruce Lee film Enter the Dragon (1973), in which she portrayed a secretary.

Clark was also in Black Mamba (1974). The same year, she appeared opposite Calvin Lockhart, Michael Gambon and Peter Cushing in The Beast Must Die (1974). In 1975, Clark was in Switchblade Sisters. Other films Clark appeared in during the 1970s included Clay Pigeon (1971), Beware! The Blob (1972) and Newman's Law (1974). On television, Clark portrayed Janet Lawson, the fiancée of Lamont Sanford in the 1970s sitcom Sanford and Son.

== Personal life and death ==
In 1968, Clark married Billy Dee Williams in Hawaii. She was the stepmother of his son Corey, from his first marriage. Their marriage lasted only three years, and they officially divorced in 1971. In a 2000 interview, Clark has said she was almost raped while filming a scene for Black Mamba.

Clark died on May 18, 2023, the same day as her Slaughter co-star, Jim Brown. She was 85.

== Partial filmography ==
- For Love of Ivy (1968) – Radio Phone Girl
- Midnight Cowboy (1969) – Girl at Party (uncredited)
- Putney Swope (1969) – (uncredited)
- Stop! (1970) – Marlene
- The Landlord (1970) – Marlene
- Clay Pigeon (1971) – Saddle
- Night of the Cobra Woman (1972) – Lena Aruza
- Beware! The Blob (1972) – Mariane Hargis
- Slaughter (1972) – Kim
- Incident on a Dark Street (1973) – Rose
- Ganja & Hess (1973) – Ganja Meda
- Enter the Dragon (1973) – Secretary
- The Beast Must Die (1974) – Caroline Newcliffe
- Newman's Law (1974) – Edie
- Black Mamba (1974) – The Witch
- Lord Shango (1975) – Jenny
- Switchblade Sisters (1975) – Muff
- The Baron (1977) – Caroline
