= There Shall Be No Darkness =

1950 short story by James Blish

- Short story by James Blish
- Genre: Short story

Publication
- Published in: Thrilling Wonder Stories
- Publication date: April 1950
- Publication place: United States

"There Shall Be No Darkness" is a horror story by the American writer James Blish that was published in 1950. It concerns a group of people at a remote country manor who discover that one of their number is a ravenous werewolf. The story was adapted for the screen in 1974 as The Beast Must Die. Blish himself described the story as "a schoolboy pastiche of Dracula".

The story originally appeared in Thrilling Wonder Stories. It was first published in book form by Twayne Publishers in 1952 in the fantasy anthology Witches Three, a volume that also included Fritz Leiber's Conjure Wife and Fletcher Pratt's The Blue Star.

The story attempts to offer a scientific explanation for lycanthropy. One of the characters, a psychiatrist named Christian Lundgren, states that the condition is the result of a mutation in the pineal gland of the afflicted person's brain. At the same time Blish also relies on established werewolf mythology for plot devices, such as the use of wolfsbane and silver. A female character named Doris is revealed to be a witch, and this subplot is important to the story's resolution.

== Plot ==
The story takes place at a manor in the Scottish countryside. A wealthy man named Tom Newcliffe has invited a group of artists and friends together for a weekend gathering. Of particular importance to the story is Jan Jarmoskowski, a Polish concert pianist. Paul Foote, a painter, detects hints that Jan may in fact be a werewolf, and he is proven right. The musician transforms under the light of the full moon, and the guests at first prepare some makeshift silver bullets and attempt to track him, but this results in nothing more than a dead hunting dog and some wasted ammunition. Following this, the group fortifies itself inside the mansion to wait for their quarry to return, at which point they hope to be able to defeat him.
