= The Blue Star (novel) =

1969 novel by Fletcher Pratt

- Cover of first stand-alone edition
- Author: Fletcher Pratt
- Illustrator: Ron Walotsky
- Language: English
- Series: Ballantine Adult Fantasy series
- Genre: Fantasy
- Publisher: Ballantine Books
- Publication date: 1969
- Publication place: United States
- Media type: Print (paperback)
- Pages: 250

The Blue Star is a fantasy novel by the American writer Fletcher Pratt, the second of his two major fantasies. It was first published by Twayne Publishers in 1952 in the fantasy anthology Witches Three, a volume that also included Fritz Leiber's Conjure Wife and James Blish's "There Shall Be No Darkness". Its first publication as a stand-alone novel was in paperback by Ballantine Books in May 1969, as the inaugural volume of the Ballantine Adult Fantasy series. The Ballantine edition included an introduction by Lin Carter; it was reprinted twice, in 1975 and 1981. It has also been translated into French, German, Italian and Spanish.

== Plot ==
The novel is set in a parallel world in which the existence of psychic powers has permitted the development of witchcraft into a science; in contrast, the physical sciences have languished, resulting in a modern culture reminiscent of Earth's eighteenth century. Witchcraft is hereditary but the ability to use it can be held by only one member of a family line at a time, being passed from mother to daughter at the daughter's loss of virginity. The daughter's lover then gains possession of her magical talisman, a jewel known as a "blue star", which enables him to read the mind of anyone he looks in the eye. The catch is that he retains access to this power only so long as he keeps faith with his witch lover.

The empire in which the action is set is comparable to the Austrian one in Earth's own history. The government bans witchcraft, which merely serves to drive its practitioners underground, where they can fall prey to the use and abuse of unscrupulous powerful or ambitious individuals. The protagonists are Lalette Asterhax, a hereditary witch, and Rodvard Bergelin, an ordinary government clerk who has been recruited into the radical conspiracy of the Sons of the New Day. Rodvard, though attracted to the daughter of a baron, is commanded by his superiors to seduce Lalette instead to gain the use of her blue star in the furtherance of their revolutionary aims. The witch is no more truly enamored of him than he is of her, but both fall in with the scheme for their own reasons, unaware of how much they are simply pawns in the larger scheme of things.

Everything soon goes bad, and the couple is forced to flee the empire. Various adventures and complications ensue as they stray into one cause or acquaintance after another, gradually growing beyond their shallow, selfish roots into a greater understanding.

== Reception ==
Witches Three received favorable reviews in The New York Times, December 14, 1952, by Basil Davenport, and in The Washington Post, January 4, 1953, by an anonymous reviewer. Davenport singled out The Blue Star as "[t]he most ambitious and most stimulating of the stories" and called it "a romance with a scope far beyond that of the common science-fiction novel." The Post reviewer did not address the merits of the individual pieces, but noted that "[t]he authors are old hands at conjuring up suspense and fear" and that "[a]n idle hour or two in this company can be quite diverting."

In the February 1953 Galaxy, Groff Conklin praised the novel as "an immensely effective piece of mannered pseudo-historical writing . . . full of color, sex, and wonderful robust characters." Boucher and McComas, however, dismissed it as "long and dreary."

On its first independent publication in 1969 The Blue Star was reviewed in If, November 1969, and Worlds of Fantasy, Winter 1970, by Lester del Rey, who would be responsible for its later reprintings at Ballantine, and in The Magazine of Fantasy and Science Fiction, February, 1970, by James Blish, who had been one of Pratt's co-contributors to Witches Three. Blish noted that "the depth of characterization in this book is alone a source of astonishment. . . . The style, too, is more flexible and more evocative than in any other work of Pratt's.

Brian Stableford, who assessed both of Pratt's major fantasies in his article on the author in The Encyclopedia of Fantasy (1997), called The Blue Star "a more original and more impressive work" than his earlier The Well of the Unicorn, and "one of the finest heroic fantasies of its period."
