= Seret Scott =

American actor, director and playwright

- Born: Seret Scott; September 1, 1949 (age 77); Washington, District of Columbia, U.S.
- Education: New York University
- Occupations: Actor; director; playwright
- Years active: 1970–present
- Spouse: Amos A. Williams (m. 1976)

Seret Scott (/səˈrɛt/; born September 1, 1949) is an American actress, director, and playwright, best known for her roles in the films Losing Ground and Pretty Baby, as well as guest appearances on the televisions shows The Equalizer, Miami Vice, and Cosby. She is also known for her theatrical roles on Broadway and the many plays she has directed on national and regional stages.

Seret Scott directed The Old Settler by John Henry Redwood at The Studio Theatre in Washington, D.C., in 1997.

== Early life ==
Scott was born on September 1, 1949, in Washington D.C. She has referred to herself as “a child of the 60's,” as her youth in D.C. was marked by segregation and civil rights turmoil. She began her career as an actress in 1969 when she left New York University, where she was studying, to join the Free Southern Theater, a community theater group allied with the civil rights movement that sought to introduce free, socially incisive theater for African Americans in the South.

== Career ==
=== Stage ===
When she returned to New York City, Scott continued to participate in activist theatre, including anti-Vietnam performances and performances for inmates at Rikers and Sing Sing prisons. She also began her off-Broadway career, appearing in the 1970 play Slave Ship at Theatre-in-the-Church in New York City. In 1974, Scott appeared on Broadway as Sue Belle in Ray Aranha's play My Sister, My Sister, for which she received a Drama Desk Award for Outstanding Performance.

Following her Broadway success, Scott went on to work as an actress for decades in New York City and around the country, including another appearance on Broadway in Ntozake Shange's 1976 play For Colored Girls Who Have Considered Suicide / When the Rainbow Is Enuf.

In 1989, Scott made her directorial debut with Some Sweet Day, written by Nancy Fales Garrett, which was reviewed favorably in the New York Times. After this success, Scott transitioned full time into a career as a director and directed scores of plays off-Broadway and in regional theater productions, including at San Diego's Old Globe Theatre, the Oregon Shakespeare Festival, and Chicago's Court Theatre.

=== Film ===
Scott's first screen role was as “Flora” in Pretty Baby, a 1978 drama directed by Louis Malle, starring Brooke Shields, Keith Carradine, and Susan Sarandon.

Scott's most seminal role was as “Sara,” a professor of French philosophy navigating complicated relationships with her artist husband, her work, and other artists in the 1982 film Losing Ground, written and directed by Kathleen Collins. The film was one of the first feature films ever directed by an African American woman. Although it won first prize at the Figueroa International Film Festival in Portugal, Losing Ground did not receive widespread attention until its rediscovery decades later.

In 2015, New York Times film critic A.O. Scott called Losing Ground “a puzzle and a marvel,” and wrote that it “casts a highly individual spell.” In 2019, The New Yorker film critic Richard Brody wrote that the film “reveals Collins to be one of the most accomplished and original filmmakers of her time.” Scott's role in the film followed her starring role in another of Collins’ productions, the play The Brothers, at the American Place Theater in New York City in April 1982.

Scott went on to appear in various television series throughout the 1980s and 1990s, including Miami Vice and Cosby while continuing her career as a stage actress, director and playwright.

== Filmography ==
=== Theatre actress ===
Year	Title	Role	Theater
1970	Slave Ship, LeRoi Jones playwright	Noliwe	Theatre-in-the-Church, New York City
1974	My Sister, My Sister, Ray Aranha playwright	Sue Belle	Little Theatre, New York City
1976	For Colored Girls Who Have Considered Suicide / When the Rainbow Is Enuf, Ntozake Shange playwright	Understudy	Booth Theatre, New York City
1981	Weep Not for Me, Gus Edwards playwright	Crissie Adams	Theater Four, New York City
1981	Meetings, Mustapha Matura playwright	Elsa	Marymount Manhattan, New York City
1982	Brothers, Kathleen Collins playwright	Caroline Edwards	American Place Theatre, New York City
1983	Puppetplay, Pearl Cleage playwright	Woman One	Theater Four, New York City
1985	Eyes of the American, Samm-Art Williams playwright	Roberta Ottley/Velda	Theater Four, New York City
1988	A Burning Beach, Eduardo Machado playwright	Maria	American Place Theatre, New York City
1996	The Alexander Plays...Suzanne in Stages , Adrienne Kennedy playwright	unnamed character	Joseph Papp Public Theater/ Susan Stein Shiva Theater, New York City

=== Films and television actress ===
Seret Scott film and television credits
Year	Title	Role	Notes
1978	Pretty Baby	Flora	Film
1982	Losing Ground	Sara Rogers	Film. Written and directed by Kathleen Collins. Also starred Bill Gunn, Duane Jones.
1987	Miami Vice	Esther Nevin	1 episode
1988	The Equalizer	Elena Rodriguez	Episode: "Sea of Fire"
1991	The Days and Nights of Molly Dodd	Louise	1 episode
1991	Mathnet	Prosecutor	1 episode
1991	Murder in Mind	Sarah Bendix	1 episode
1993	Tribeca	Plain-clothed Cop	1 episode
2000	Cosby	untitled role	1 episode

=== Playwright ===
Year	Title	Theater
2008	Second Line	ATLAS – Lab Theatre II, Washington, D.C.

=== Theatre director ===
Year	Title	Theater
1989	Some Sweet Day	Long Wharf Theater, New York City
1994	Zooman and the Sign	McGinn-Cazale Theatre, New York City
1999	Mujeres Y Hombres	New Victory Theatre, New York City
2005	Birdie Blue	Second Stage Theatre, New York City
2005	Starving	Woolly Mammoth, Washington, D.C.
2005	The Piano Lesson	Arena Stage, Washington, D.C.
2006	Yohen	West End Theatre, New York City
2011	Richard III	Oregon Shakespeare Festival, Ashland, Oregon
2013	A Raisin in the Sun	The Don and Ann Brown Theatre, West Palm Beach, Florida
2014	Native Son (World Premiere)	Court Theatre, Chicago, Illinois
2015	Autumn (World Premiere)	Crossroads Theatre, New Brunswick, New Jersey
2019	For Colored Girls Who Have Considered Suicide / When the Rainbow Is Enuf	Court Theatre, Chicago, Illinois

== Personal life ==
Scott has been a resident of Teaneck, New Jersey.
