= Billie Allen =

American actress (1925–2015)

- Allen in Route 66, 1961
- Born: Wilhelmina Louise Allen; January 13, 1925; Richmond, Virginia, USA
- Died: December 29, 2015 (aged 90); Manhattan, New York City, New York, USA
- Years active: 1949–1996
- Spouses: Duane H. Grant, Sr. (divorced) Luther Henderson (m. 1981; died 2003)
- Children: 2
- Relatives: Candace Allen (niece)

Billie Allen (January 13, 1925 – December 29, 2015) was an American actress, theater director, dancer and entertainer. Allen was one of the first black actors and performers to appear on television and stage in the United States, at a time when those venues were largely closed to African Americans. During the 1950s, Allen became one of the first black entertainers to have a recurring role on network television when she was cast as a WAC on staff on the CBS army base comedy The Phil Silvers Show, from 1955 to 1959. She was one of the first African Americans to appear on television commercials in the U.S. She was also one of the earliest African-American actors on daytime soap operas as she appeared in the mid-1950s as the character Ada Chandler on the popular daytime soap opera The Edge of Night. Allen was also known for her work on Broadway and off-Broadway.

== Life and career ==
Allen was born Wilhelmina Louise Allen on January 13, 1925, in Richmond, Virginia. Her father, William R. Allen, was an actuary, while her mother, the former Mamie Wimbush, was a teacher. Her interest in the performing arts, especially ballet and opera, began early in life. A fan of singer Marian Anderson, Allen attended her 1939 concert at the Lincoln Memorial after the Daughters of the American Revolution barred Anderson from performing at the DAR Constitution Hall.

Allen attended the Hampton Institute, now known as present-day Hampton University. She then moved to New York City during the mid-1940s to pursue acting and dance. She was cast as a dancer in several Broadway productions early in her career, including the 1947 musical review Caribbean Carnival; a Broadway revival of Four Saints in Three Acts in 1952; and My Darlin' Aida, an adaptation of a Giuseppe Verdi opera, which also opened in 1952. She also appeared with one of her mentors, the legendary Ethel Waters, in the revival of the off-Broadway production of Mamba's Daughters.

Allen was accepted into the Actors Studio, where she studied under the renowned acting teacher and actor Lee Strasberg. She made her film debut with the 1949 race film Souls of Sin. She was later cast as understudy in the part of "Beneatha Younger" in the 1959 Broadway premier production of playwright Lorraine Hansberry's A Raisin in the Sun. She later assumed the full-time role of "Beneatha Younger" when actress and friend Diana Sands exited the role. Allen befriended several members of the cast, notably actress Ruby Dee, with whom she shared a friendship that lasted over 55 years. She later directed her lifelong friend Ruby Dee in the 2001 off-Broadway dramatic play Saint Lucy's Eyes, which premiered at the Cherry Lane Theatre in New York and was later staged and directed by Allen in the early 2000s at Atlanta, Georgia's Alliance Theatre.

In 1960, Billie Allen portrayed a maid in the Broadway debut of Ira Levin's Critic's Choice. Her character "Essie" was the housekeeper of the play's main protagonist, theater critic "Parker Ballantine," played by Henry Fonda, and his wife, portrayed by Georgann Johnson. She also appeared in James Baldwin's Blues for Mr. Charlie, a 1964 dramatic play loosely based on the killing of Emmett Till. Her last Broadway production as an actress was in A Teaspoon Every Four Hours in 1969. A Teaspoon Every Four Hours ran for a record 97 preview performances before closing the day after its official opening night.

Aside from her breakthrough recurring role in The Phil Silvers Show on CBS during the 1950s, her other television roles included Car 54, Where Are You? on NBC in the early 1960s and Law & Order during the 1990s. Allen's film credits included Black Like Me in 1964, The Wiz in 1978, and Losing Ground in 1982.

In 1973, Allen joined with actor and founder Garland Lee Thompson, Jr., actor Morgan Freeman and journalist Clayton Riley to establish the Frank Silvera Writers Workshop, located in Harlem, as a tribute to its namesake, Frank Silvera, a character actor, theater director and acting teacher. Notable students of the Frank Silvera Writers Workshop have included award-winning playwrights Charles Fuller, Ntozake Shange and Samm-Art Williams. By the early 1980s, Allen was established as an impeccable director, directing such edgy and provocative productions as Kathleen Collins's play The Brothers in 1982, Anna Deavere Smith's Aye, Aye, Aye, I'm Integrated in 1984, and the musical Miss Ethel Waters. On the small side, Allen appeared in the opening sketch for Eddie Murphy Raw (1987).

Allen received a Lucille Lortel Awards nomination in 2006 for directing Funnyhouse of a Negro, a ground-breaking one-act play by Adrienne Kennedy, in 2006. Allen had originated the role of the lead character "Sarah" during the play's debut in 1964. She was also awarded in 2006, The Rose McClendon Trailblazer Award from the Classical Theatre of Harlem.

== Personal life and death ==
Billie Allen was married twice. Her first marriage to aerospace engineer Duane H. Grant, Sr. ended in divorce. Her second husband was Luther Henderson, a pianist, and prolific Broadway composer and arranger, with whom she had co-created the musical Little Ham, which was based on the play of the same name written by poet and playwright Langston Hughes. Allen and Henderson, who were both AUDELCO Award Winners, remained married until his death in 2003.

Billie Allen died peacefully at her home in Manhattan, New York City, on December 29, 2015, at the age of 90, just 15 days shy of her 91st birthday. She was survived by her son and daughter, Duane H. Grant, Jr. and Carolyn J. Grant; one granddaughter; several stepchildren; a brother, Dr. Edward B. Allen, and a host of relatives and artists that she directed and mentored throughout her long career. The writer Candace Allen is her niece.
