= Kathleen Collins =

American writer and filmmaker (1942–1988)

- Born: Kathleen Conwell; March 18, 1942; Jersey City, New Jersey, U.S.
- Died: September 18, 1988 (aged 46); New York City, New York, U.S.
- Other names: Kathleen Conwell Collins; Kathleen Collins Prettyman
- Education: Skidmore College; Harvard University; Paris-Sorbonne University
- Occupations: Writer, playwright, author, filmmaker, educator
- Spouse: Alfred Prettyman
- Children: 2
- Website: kathleencollins.org/about

Kathleen Collins (March 18, 1942 – September 18, 1988) (also known as Kathleen Conwell, Kathleen Conwell Collins or Kathleen Collins Prettyman) was an African American polymath from Jersey City, New Jersey, notable for her contributions as poet, playwright, writer, filmmaker, director, civil rights activist, and educator.

Her two feature narratives – The Cruz Brothers and Miss Malloy (1980) and Losing Ground (1982) – furthered the range of Black women's films. Although Losing Ground was denied large-scale exhibition, it was among the first films created by a Black woman deliberately designed to tell a story intended for popular consumption, with a feature-length narrative structure.

Collins thus paved the way for Julie Dash's Daughters of the Dust (1991) to become the first feature-length narrative film created by a Black woman to be placed in commercial distribution. Influenced by Lorraine Hansberry, she wrote about "African Americans as human subjects and not as mere race subjects" [emphasis in the original].

== Early life ==
Born to Loretta (née Pierce) and Frank Conwell and raised in Jersey City, Kathleen, at the age of 15, won first prize at an annual poetry reading contest at Rutgers Newark College of Arts and Sciences for her rendition of Walt Whitman's "A Child Goes Forth" and "I Learned My Lesson Complete". On March 3, 1958, an article in the Jersey Journal reported that in addition to working as assistant editor of the Lincoln High School's publication the Leader, Conwell was on the editorial staff of the school yearbook, the Quill; a member of the National Honors Society; and a past secretary of the Student Council.

After graduating from high school in 1959, Collins went to Skidmore College, where she received a BA in philosophy and religion in 1963. In 1962, after her campus was visited by two leaders of the Student Nonviolent Coordinating Committee (SNCC), she became active in the Civil Rights Movement, canvassing in Georgia for black residents to register to vote; as a result, she was arrested twice while working with the Albany Movement.

After she graduated from Skidmore, she taught high-school French in Newton, Massachusetts, while attending graduate school at Harvard University at night. In 1965, she won a scholarship to study in France at Paris-Sorbonne University, where, in 1966, she obtained an MA in French literature and cinema.

== Career ==
Collins joined the faculty of City College of New York and became a professor of film history and screenwriting, where cinematographer Ronald K Gray encouraged her to go ahead with a screenplay she had adapted from a Henry Roth short story. That film became The Cruz Brothers and Mrs. Malloy, a short film (under one hour), which eventually won First Prize at the Sinking Creek Film Festival.

This was followed in 1982 by Losing Ground (starring Seret Scott, Bill Gunn, and Duane Jones), which Colins wrote and directed. Losing Ground was among the first feature-length drama directed by a black American woman, preceded by Jessie Maple's 1981 film Will. Losing Ground won First Prize at the Figueroa International Film Festival in Portugal, garnering much international acclaim, but was not picked up for distribution at the time. In 1983, the Museum of Modern Art screened it as part of a Cineprobe series. Both of Collins' films were shot in Rockland County, New York, and are currently distributed by Milestone Films.

Collins wrote many other plays and screenplays, but her two most well-known theatrical plays are In the Midnight Hour (1981) and The Brothers (1982), both of which are available through Samuel French. Themes frequently explored in her work are issues of marital malaise, male dominance and impotence, freedom of expression and intellectual pursuit, and her protagonists are cited as "typically self-reflective women who move from a state of subjugation to empowerment."

=== Posthumous accomplishments ===
On Collins's abrupt death in 1988, the bulk of her work, most of it unpublished, was left to her daughter, Nina Collins, who in 2006 began to sift through her mother's enormous archive and began working to have it published, restored and reissued.

In 2015, A Public Space posthumously published Collins's short story "Interiors", a fictionalized account of her divorce from her first husband.

Collins's 1982 Losing Ground was restored and reissued in 2015. The film, which had only been seen at film festivals in 1982/83, had its first theatrical release in 2015 at Film Society of Lincoln Center, opening the series "Tell it like it is: Black Independents in New York, 1968–1986". It would later be described in The New Yorker as "the great rediscovery of 2015", and as being "rediscovered and restored to its rightful place in the canon of nineteen-eighties independent film." Losing Ground and The Cruz Brothers and Mrs. Malloy were released together on two-disc sets (DVD or Blu-ray) by Milestone in April 2016.

In December 2016, a collection of Collins's short stories was published under HarperCollins' Ecco imprint under the title Whatever Happened to Interracial Love? The title story was published by Granta in July 2016. These acclaimed stories were written in the 1970s and mined some of the same intimate territory of Black women's lives, loves, and losses as Losing Ground. Prior to its release, it was listed as one of the most anticipated books of the fall of 2016 by the Huffington Post, New York, The Boston Globe, Lit Hub, and The Millions. The collection received starred reviews in Kirkus Reviews and Publishers Weekly and was named one of the best books of 2016 by outlets that included Elle, NPR, Nylon, Publishers Weekly, and VICE.

In February 2019, Nina Collins compiled her mother's short stories, as well as her diary entries, scripts, and screenplays into Notes From a Black Woman’s Diary.

In May 2021, a multidisciplinary artist group Afrofemononomy (whose members include Eisa Davis) produced and performed a series of Collins' one-act plays, including Begin the Beguine, The Healing, The Reading, and Remembrance at outdoor locations in New York City.

== Personal life ==
Collins was married, but divorced in 1975. She had two children from her marriage: Nina Lorez Collins and Emilio Collins. She was married a second time, to Alfred Prettyman.

Collins died from breast cancer in 1988 at the age of 46, at the Memorial Sloan Kettering Cancer Center in New York City.

In November 2021, Collins was awarded the inaugural Icon Tribute from Gotham Film & Media Institute, with executive director Jeffrey Sharp stating: "Kathleen Collins lived an inspirational life itself worthy of a film. She fought for civil rights, then fought for the opportunity to tell powerful stories about people of color. She is an expert and nuanced storyteller who overcame a variety of systematic obstacles in order to tell stories that challenged stereotypes and featured nuanced depictions of marginalized communities. It is an honor to recognize this talented and dedicated individual who never got the appreciation she deserved."
