= Starving (disambiguation) =

Starving is a severe deficiency in caloric energy intake.

Starving may also refer to:

- Starving (song), a 2016 song by Hailee Steinfeld and Grey
- Starving (play), a 2005 play by S. M. Shephard-Massat
