= Losing Ground (1982 film) =

1982 American film by Kathleen Collins

- 2015 poster
- Directed by: Kathleen Collins
- Written by: Kathleen Collins
- Produced by: Eleanor Charles
- Starring: Seret Scott; Bill Gunn; Duane Jones
- Cinematography: Ronald K. Gray
- Edited by: Ronald K. Gray; Kathleen Collins
- Music by: Michael Minard
- Distributed by: Milestone Film & Video
- Release date: June 1982
- Running time: 86 minutes
- Country: United States
- Languages: English; Spanish
- Budget: $125,000

Losing Ground is a semiautobiographical 1982 American drama film written and directed by Kathleen Collins, and starring Seret Scott, Bill Gunn and Duane Jones. It is the first feature-length drama directed by an African-American woman since the 1920s and won First Prize at the Figueira da Foz International Film Festival in Portugal.

In 2020, the film was selected for preservation in the National Film Registry by the Library of Congress as being "culturally, historically, or aesthetically significant".

== Plot ==
Sara Rogers is a well-loved African-American philosophy professor who teaches courses on logic. She is married to Victor, a successful African-American painter. To celebrate the sale of one of his paintings to a museum, Victor decides to rent a house for the summer where he can focus on his art. Sara, however, is annoyed by his plan because she had hoped to spend the summer in the city researching a paper she is writing on ecstatic experiences. She knows that her access to books and resources will be limited in a small town and feels that Victor does not value her academic work as much as he values his own artistic pursuits. Nevertheless, after finding a house they both adore, she agrees to accompany him for the summer.

At the rented house, Victor becomes obsessed with painting local women, befriending one in particular—a Puerto Rican woman named Celia. Feeling jealous, Sara returns to the city for a few days to act in a student film after one of her students begs her to participate. During the filming, she meets Duke, the filmmaker's uncle, who plays her love interest in the movie. Duke is immediately attracted to her.

Sara brings Duke to the rented house, and Victor becomes visibly jealous of him. Victor’s jealousy intensifies when his friend and mentor, Carlos, begins flirting with Celia. One morning, after witnessing Victor sexually harassing Celia, Sara grows furious and demands that he stop his inappropriate behavior in front of her. Feeling overwhelmed, she leaves Victor and confides in her mother, expressing that she feels out of control and on shaky ground—a stark contrast to her usual steady and contemplative nature.

Returning to the city, Sara completes her final scenes for the film. Victor goes to find her and arrives just in time to watch her character shoot Duke’s character for being unfaithful to her.

== Cast ==
- Seret Scott as Sara Rogers
- Bill Gunn as Victor
- Duane Jones as Duke
- Billie Allen as Leila, Sara's Mother
- Gary Bolling as George
- Noberto Kerner as Carlos, Victor's friend
- Maritza Rivera as Celia

== Production ==
Losing Ground was filmed in New York City and in Nyack, Piermont and Haverstraw in Rockland County. The film had a budget of $125,000.

== Response and legacy ==
Losing Ground did not have a theatrical release, and thus never played outside of the film festival circuit during Collins' lifetime — the director died in 1988 at the age of 46. The film was largely overlooked at that time. In 1983, the Museum of Modern Art screened it as part of a Cineprobe series.

In 2015, the film was restored by the filmmaker's daughter, Nina Collins, and reissued. In the same year, the film screened at Film Society of Lincoln Center, spurring critical and popular interest in the film. Critics raved about the film; Richard Brody of The New Yorker wrote that "had it screened widely in its time, it would have marked film history." A. O. Scott of The New York Times wrote that the film "feels like news, like a bulletin from a vital and as-yet-unexplored dimension of reality." In The Stranger, Charles Mudede described the film as being "one of the most important and original American films of the second half of the 20th century." The A.V. Club listed the film as being among the 52 most important American independent films.

In 2016, Milestone Films released the film on DVD and Blu-ray.

Losing Ground is currently streaming via the Criterion Channel.

On the review aggregator website Rotten Tomatoes, 96% of 24 critics' reviews are positive. The website's consensus reads: "As beautifully filmed as it is narratively nuanced, Losing Ground uses one couple's experiences to thoughtfully consider universal aspects of the human condition."
