= James E. Hinton =

American filmmaker

- Born: James E. Hinton Jr. November 21, 1936; Atlantic City, New Jersey, USA
- Died: February 19, 2006 (aged 69); Bronx, New York City, USA
- Education: Howard University
- Occupation: Filmmaker

James E. Hinton (sometimes credited as Jim Hinton) was an American filmmaker and photographer. He was known as a documentarian of the civil rights movement; he worked on more than 70 documentaries as a cinematographer and director; but, Hinton is most especially known for his groundbreaking cinematography on the cult film Ganja & Hess. He founded his own production company—James E. Hinton Enterprises—in 1971. He directed and lensed a number of commercial, industrial, and educational films; a set of films for the National Endowment for the Arts; a set of films for the U.S. Department of Labor; and TV documentaries. Hinton's work was included in the 2025 exhibition Photography and the Black Arts Movement, 1955–1985 at the National Gallery of Art.

== Select filmography ==
- Identity Crisis (1989) (cinematographer, co-producer)
- Greased Lightning (1977) (associate producer)
- Ganja & Hess (1973) (cinematographer)
- Don't Play Us Cheap (1973) (second unit director)
