= A Teaspoon Every Four Hours =

1969 play by Jackie Mason and Mike Mortman

- Written by: Jackie Mason; Mike Mortman
- Original language: English
- Genre: Comedy
- Setting: New York City

Premiere
- Date premiered: June 14, 1969
- Place premiered: ANTA Theatre

A Teaspoon Every Four Hours is a comedy play written by Jackie Mason and Mike Mortman which was produced on Broadway in 1969. The play set a Broadway record by having 97 previews before its official opening. After its official opening, A Teaspoon Every Four Hours closed after only one performance.

The play became the subject of public attention once again in 2011, when the musical Spider-Man: Turn Off the Dark announced a delay to its official opening, which eventually resulted in its breaking A Teaspoon Every Four Hours′ record for the most previews ever by a Broadway show which officially opened. (In 1976, the sexually themed musical revue Let My People Come played 128 performances but never officially opened.)

== Plot ==
Nat Weiss (played by Mason himself in the Broadway production) is a Jewish widower who learns that his son is in love with a black woman. Eventually Nat himself falls in love with the woman's mother. The play's title is not explained in the play itself.

== Cast ==
Besides Mason in the lead role, the Broadway cast also included Barry Pearl as the son, Vera Moore as the son's girlfriend, Billie Allen as her mother, Bernie West, Marilyn Cooper, Lee Wallace, and Lee Meredith.

== Response ==
Years later, Mason commented on the show and reactions to it: "It must have had the longest preview run in Broadway history -- ninety-seven performances. After every performance, I came out and asked for opinions from the audience. They loved that. It made them feel like philosophers. I also promoted the play on every TV show I did. All this convinced me I had a big hit. The show opened and closed in one day. The critics said it was the worst crap they ever saw. Where does this schlemiel get the idea he's an actor and a playwright? He should go into a different business. And so on. It didn't make me feel too good. But I told myself that life is too short, that you have to keep moving, that you're lucky to be on earth in the position you're in."

The play received several particularly unfavorable reviews. Clive Barnes, the critic for The New York Times, wrote, "Unfortunately the only nice thing I can say about the play is that the press representative is a close friend of mine. This, I sadly recognize, is not a commendation of much universal appeal. ... Mr. Mason may have certain talents; on the evidence before me I would hardly have suspected that writing was one of them." John Chapman of the New York Daily News was quoted as writing, "If I were the author I'd throw it away and start a new play -- or contemplate not writing anything." Jack Gaver, of United Press International, wrote, "It consists of all-too-familiar Jewish humor routines, sexual innuendo of the most basic sort endlessly repeated and what probably is intended to be a friendly treatment of the white-black racial situation that is cheapened by the other ingredients."

Steven Suskin, writing in Broadway Yearbook, 1999-2000: A Relevant and Irreverent Record, described the play as "the Moose Murders of its day, which is to say a play so inane that it remains memorable through the years."

Thomas S. Hischak, in American Theatre: A Chronicle of Comedy and Drama, 1969-2000, wrote that the Broadway "season could not have started worse than with A Teaspoon Every Four Hours .... The comedy was unanimously panned ('an overdose of vulgarity'), critics arguing over whether it was more offensive to Jews or African-Americans."

Mason was interviewed in 2011 about the prospects of Spider-Man: Turn Off the Dark breaking his play's record for most previews. "The longest preview period, I don't see as an honor," he said. "Running a show after it opens, I see as an honor." Mason said that when the record is broken, "I won't cry a tear, because there's nothing to be excited about."
