= Witches' Brew (film) =

1980 film by Richard Shorr

- Directed by: Richard Shorr; Herbert L. Strock (additional sequences)
- Written by: Syd Dutton; Richard Shorr
- Produced by: Donna Ashbrook
- Starring: Teri Garr; Richard Benjamin; Lana Turner
- Cinematography: Norman Gerard
- Edited by: Herbert L. Strock
- Music by: John Carl Parker
- Distributed by: United Artists
- Release date: October 31, 1980
- Running time: 98 minutes
- Country: United States
- Language: English

Witches' Brew, also known as Which Witch Is Which?, is a 1980 American comedy horror film co-written and directed by Richard Shorr, and starring Richard Benjamin, Teri Garr, and Lana Turner. It was based (though without any screen credit) on Fritz Leiber Jr.'s horror-fantasy novel Conjure Wife. Herbert L. Strock directed additional sequences for the film.

The film is set in a college campus. The wives of several academics practice witchcraft to advance their husbands' careers. A skeptical husband convinces his wife to cease practicing witchcraft, and then experiences a decline in his career and an attack by a disgruntled student. Meanwhile, a dying witch is trying to use a body swapping technique to eliminate the professor's wife.

== Plot ==
As in earlier film versions of Leiber's story such as Weird Woman (1944) and Night of the Eagle (1962), the story is set around a college campus where rivalries for various chairmanships of faculties take place. While the script's touch is notably lighter than in earlier film versions, verging on comedic in places, the story is basically the same.

Several of the wives practice witchcraft in order to advance their husbands' careers. Joshua Lightman does not believe that his wife Margaret's spells and hocus-pocus have been helping him, and makes her cease practising witchcraft.

Immediately things begin to go wrong for Lightman. He cuts himself shaving; he is accused by a male student of having accosted him (which loses him the chairmanship of the psychology department); and a disgruntled female student tries to kill him by sniping with a rifle from the college rooftop.

Meanwhile, Vivian Cross is controlling several of the other wives via a sculpture of an egg (modeled on a demonic witches' egg they find in a book on witchcraft) in which a being is hatched. This winged creature whose eyes shoot green flames chases Joshua's car and nearly kills him before Vivian destroys it via her magic.

Vivian, who is close to death, then hatches a plot to trade bodies with Margaret. Margaret is sent driving off a pier in her car; but Joshua uses magic to save her. Vivian succeeds in swapping souls with Margaret, but the tables are turned on her; Vivian is destroyed and Margaret is returned to her own body and starts practicing witchcraft again to help Joshua.

== Cast ==
- Teri Garr as Margaret Lightman
- Richard Benjamin as Joshua Lightman
- Lana Turner as Vivian Cross
- James Winkler as Linus Cross
- Kathryn Leigh Scott as Susan Carey
- Bill Sorrells as Nick Carey
- Kelly Jean Peters as Linda Reynolds
- Jordan Charney as Charlie Reynolds
- Nathan Roth as Ben Cohn
- Barbara Minkus as Saleswoman
- Bonnie Gondel as Marcia Groton
- Angus Scrimm as Carl Groton
- Steve Bond as Mike

== Production ==
Although Witches' Brew was not officially presented by the producing company as an adaptation of Fritz Leiber Jr.'s original story, Shorr's film was thought to "follow the general plot line of Burn, Witch, Burn". The novel had been adapted in 1944 as Weird Woman starring Lon Chaney Jr., and in 1962 as Night of the Eagle (also known as Burn Witch Burn!) starring Peter Wyngarde and Janet Blair.

It is Lana Turner's final fiction role in a feature film.

== See also ==
- List of films about witchcraft
