= Vampires (1986 film) =

1986 film

- Directed by: Len Anthony
- Written by: Len Anthony; James Harrigan
- Produced by: Len Anthony
- Starring: Orly Bender; John Bly; Jackie James; Duane Jones; Kit Jones; Robin Michaels
- Release date: 1986 (U.S.)
- Running time: 61 minutes
- Language: English

Vampires, also known as Abadon, is a 1986 horror film directed by Len Anthony and starring Duane Jones, John Bly, Jackie James, Orly Benyar, Kit Jones, and Robin Michaels; it was the final film of Duane Jones. The cinematographer was Ernest Dickerson, who later worked with Spike Lee and directed some episodes of horror TV show The Walking Dead.

The plot concerns mysterious events at a private girls' school in which the students' life-energy is drained by a mad scientist's machine. Subsequently the film was retitled Abadon and included in a double bill on VHS with Anthony's later film Fright House, under the title of the latter movie. It was released on DVD in 2016.

== Plot ==
The film begins with a series of cryptic reflections on immortality and the "promise" of living forever. In the present day, construction workers at the Abaddon School, an elite institution for the arts and music, express fear about working after sunset and accidentally damaging the basement, which houses the archives of the school’s late founder, Dr. Martin Avernus.

In a dorm setting, a young woman preparing for her day is joined by her boyfriend. Interspersed are mysterious shots and sounds suggesting some haunting or supernatural force is present. Objects are moving on their own, and finally start flying about. The mysterious images become darker, and the couple are pulled flying out of bed screaming, fate unknown.

During a gallery showing of student art, school administrator Mr. Martin attempts to secure a commercial video deal with a businessman named Frank, highlighting the school’s prestige. Meanwhile, students begin arriving for the new semester, including Deborah, a scholarship student searching for her biological parents, and Ione, who is desperate to find her boyfriend, Gary Maness, after he failed to return from a summer trip.

At the mandatory student orientation, headmistress Madeline Abaddon welcomes the class to the 18th-century estate. She issues a strict warning that the fourth floor and the basement are off-limits, threatening punishment for any student found there. Following the meeting, Deborah meets Dr. Charles Harmon, a "deep rock scientist" who claims to be on a search of his own.

Tensions rise as Michael, a long-time associate of the school, threatens to end Madeline's experiments, claiming they have "gone too far". Madeline dismisses his threats, asserting that to destroy her work, he would need her husband’s unattainable notes. Simultaneously, Ione grows increasingly unstable, hearing Gary's voice calling for help during an acting class. She learns from other students that the school was once a mental clinic where Dr. Avernus conducted "intense experiments".

Deborah’s investigation leads her to Madeline's private apartment, where she discovers a strange machine. She also finds an archive in the restricted basement near a "walled-in place" emitting "ungodly evil lights and sounds". Harmon finally reveals the truth to Deborah: Dr. Avernus designed a machine and a formula to extract "positive energy" from humans to sustain life. The process turned Avernus into a "pure negative" psychopathic killer. Harmon confesses that he is Deborah’s father and reveals that Madeline is her mother, who was pregnant when she left Paris years prior.

During a school carnival, Ione finally finds Gary, but he has been transformed into a "negative" entity. In a violent outburst, Gary stabs Ione to death in front of Deborah.

In the climax, Madeline attempts to lure Deborah to the machine, promising her eternal youth and beauty if she shares her energy. Harmon arrives to intervene, begging Madeline not to "contaminate" their daughter. Deborah rejects Madeline’s offer, calling her a "desperately pathetic wretch". Deborah flees the school and hitches a ride with a traveling "born again" preacher, identifying herself only as "Avadon" as she leaves her past behind.

== Critical reception ==
HorrorNews.net called it "completely and utterly forgettable". ComingSoon.net were equally critical, calling it a "bizarre, barely watchable direct-to-video mess".
