= The Beast Must Die (1974 film) =

1974 British film by Paul Annett

- U.S. theatrical release poster
- Directed by: Paul Annett
- Screenplay by: Michael Winder
- Based on: "There Shall Be No Darkness" by James Blish
- Produced by: John Dark; Max Rosenberg; Milton Subotsky
- Starring: Calvin Lockhart; Peter Cushing; Marlene Clark; Charles Gray; Anton Diffring
- Cinematography: Jack Hildyard
- Edited by: Peter Tanner
- Music by: Douglas Gamley
- Production company: Amicus Productions
- Distributed by: British Lion Films (UK); Cinerama Releasing Corporation (US)
- Release date: 27 April 1974
- Running time: 92 minutes
- Country: United Kingdom
- Language: English
- Budget: £187,269

The Beast Must Die is a 1974 British horror film directed by Paul Annett. The screenplay was written by Michael Winder, based on the 1950 short story "There Shall Be No Darkness" by James Blish, originally published in Thrilling Wonder Stories. The film stars Calvin Lockhart, Peter Cushing, Marlene Clark, Charles Gray, Anton Diffring, Ciaran Madden, Tom Chadbon, and Michael Gambon. The plot involves a millionaire big game hunter who gathers six people at his remote English mansion, announcing that he suspects one of them is a werewolf. The viewer is invited to unfold the mystery along with the characters.

== Plot ==
The film opens with a narrator stating that the film is a detective story where the viewer is the detective and tells the audience to watch for the "werewolf break". Near the climax, the "werewolf break", which is a 30-second pause where the audience is asked to guess the werewolf's identity based on clues from the film, briefly interrupts the film.

Millionaire Tom Newcliffe invites a group of people, along with his wife Caroline, to spend some time in his rural English mansion, where he reveals that one of them is a werewolf and therefore must be killed. The group is composed of disgraced diplomat Arthur Bennington; Jan and Davina Gilmore, a pianist and his ex-student, now his wife; Paul Foote, an artist recently released from prison; and Professor Lundgren, an archaeologist and a lycanthropy enthusiast.

They all stay in the mansion where they are submitted to various tests to detect whether they might be a werewolf. The entire house is under surveillance by CCTV cameras, as well as motion sensors in the grounds around the mansion set up and overseen by Tom's Polish associate Pavel, who does not believe in werewolves.

The only way to determine the identity of the werewolf is for a certain combination of elements to occur all at once, including a full moon and the presence of wolfsbane pollen in the air. When this fails to produce any lycanthropic reactions, Tom makes each of the potential werewolves grab silver objects to provoke allergic reactions, but this too proves unsuccessful. Later that same night, Pavel is killed by the werewolf, which makes Tom even more obsessive in his hunt, to his wife's increasing annoyance. Tom gradually focuses his suspicions on Paul Foote, who was reportedly arrested after eating human flesh. Foote denies being the werewolf as the creature continues killing, with the helicopter pilot, diplomat Arthur Bennington, and Caroline's dog all falling victim.

Tom subjects the remaining group to one final test: placing a silver bullet in their mouth. As Caroline submits to the test, her hairy, clawed hand is shown before she immediately transforms into the werewolf. She (fully transformed) attacks Tom, and he kills her by shooting her with a silver bullet, leaving him very distraught and confused because Caroline was alongside him when the werewolf killed her dog. Prof. Lundgren deduces that Caroline must have contracted the werewolf disease while taking care of her dog's wounds due to an open cut on her hand she sustained from a broken wineglass at dinner. Tom becomes enraged, convinced that Foote is the werewolf. When he attempts to confront him, however, he finds that Foote has also been killed. To avenge his wife, he enters the woods surrounding the mansion to hunt the werewolf. He finds the beast and finally shoots and kills it. Once dead, the werewolf reverts to its human form, and it is revealed to be Jan, the pianist.

Tom returns to Prof. Lundgren and Davina, and he realizes that he was bitten by the werewolf during the scuffle, thus condemning him to inherit the creature's curse. Not wanting to be a monster, Tom locks himself in the mansion and shoots himself in the head with a silver bullet, ending the werewolf's bloodline.

== Cast ==
- Calvin Lockhart as Tom Newcliffe
- Peter Cushing as Professor Christopher Lundgren
- Marlene Clark as Caroline Newcliffe
- Charles Gray as Arthur Bennington
- Anton Diffring as Pavel
- Ciaran Madden as Davina
- Tom Chadbon as Paul Foote
- Michael Gambon as Jan Jarmokowski
- Sam Mansaray as butler
- Andrew Lodge as pilot
- Carl Bohun as 1st hunter
- Eric Carte as 2nd hunter
- Valentine Dyall as werewolf break narrator (voice, uncredited)
- Annie Ross as Caroline Newcliffe (voice, uncredited)

== Production ==
In the audio commentary with director Annett on the home video release, Annett says he hated the addition of the werewolf break: "What can I say about it? I hated it. It stopped the film stone dead and I thought it was completely artificial and unnecessary". It was not in Annett's version of the film; he attributes the idea to producer Milton Subotsky. He does admit that some, including critic Leonard Maltin, liked it.

== Release ==
An alternative version of the film was released under the title Black Werewolf. This cut omits the "werewolf break" near the climax.

== Critical reception ==
The Monthly Film Bulletin wrote:

"This is a detective story and you are the detectives, but the question is not who is the murderer but who is the werewolf ... watch for the werewolf break ... a chance for you to make up your minds". Thus, roughly, runs the prologue addressed to the audience in The Beast Must Die, one of the few Amicus films to break away from the tradition of horror compilations. And sure enough, some three-quarters of the way through, the audience is given a visual recap on events and personalities and a fifteen second pause for thought. The gimmick is amusing enough and brings a touch of the old-time fairground entertainment into proceedings; sadly, though, the film seems prepared to take its undoubtedly powerful material entirely at this pick-the-beast level, with each of the characters being 'set up' in turn as the guilty party. The story of an outbreak of animalism among the fatally flawed rich, with its parallel theme of the hunter who is fated to turn hunted ... is surely capable of supporting a much more serious and atmospheric treatment. Amicus still seem to be in need of a good scriptwriter and also, perhaps, a director able to make visually real the themes in the often quite inspired material the company chooses to film."

Allmovie wrote, "The non-anthology output of Amicus Productions tended to be hit-and-miss, but The Beast Must Die is an interesting if lightweight horror-mystery hybrid from the studio."

== Home media ==
The film was released on DVD as part of the Umbrella Entertainment box set Amicus: The Studio That Dripped Blood. This edition includes the following special features: commentary by director Paul Annett, a "Directing The Beast" featurette, and Amicus Collection trailers.

It is also included in a coffin-shaped Amicus box set released by Anchor Bay UK.

The film was released separately on DVD on 25 July 2006 by Dark Sky Films. The special features included in this release are commentary by director Paul Annett, the "Directing The Beast" featurette, Paul Annett's tribute to Peter Cushing, cast and crew bios, liner notes, trailers, and a still gallery.

The film has subsequently been released on Blu-ray by Severin Films in the US and Powerhouse Indicator in the UK.
