= Identity Crisis (film) =

1989 film by Melvin Van Peebles

- Directed by: Melvin Van Peebles
- Written by: Mario Van Peebles
- Produced by: James E. Hinton; Melvin Van Peebles
- Starring: Mario Van Peebles; Richard Fancy; Ilan Mitchell-Smith
- Cinematography: James E. Hinton
- Edited by: Victor Kanefsky; Melvin Van Peebles
- Music by: Dunn Pearson
- Release date: September 15, 1989
- Running time: 100 minutes
- Country: United States
- Language: English

Identity Crisis is a 1989 comedy film directed by Melvin Van Peebles. Written by Mario Van Peebles, the film is about a rapper who winds up sharing his body with the soul of a dead fashion designer, switching between personalities every time he is struck on the head.

== Plot ==
Melvin Van Peebles is the film's narrator, introducing the film's main characters. Yves Malmaison (Richard Fancy) is a world-famous French fashion designer. A flaming homosexual with a preference for red hair, he once experimented with an American woman, and thus he has a son, Sebastian (Ilan Mitchell-Smith). Chilly D (Mario Van Peebles) is a struggling rapper who has been stealing dresses made by Malmaison to redesign and give to his many girlfriends.

On the night of a big fashion show, Malmaison is poisoned, and Chilly D is chased by the same people who poisoned the fashion designer. Through a turn of events, the souls of both men wind up in Chilly D's body. Several days later, following Malmaison's funeral, Malmaison wakes up in a hospital to discover, to his shock, that he is no longer in his own body.

Stumbling the streets, confused, Malmaison as Chilly D tries to piece together elements of his former life, with no such luck. Making things even more difficult is the fact that every time they are struck or hit, they switch between their two personalities, leading to confusion and disorientation for people they bump into.

Malmaison manages to convince his son Sebastian that it is him, and they try to find out who killed him, learning that drug smugglers are trying to take over the company. Eventually, Chilly D manages to have all of Malmaison's memories, but still be himself, and so he and Sebastian go into business together.

== Cast ==
- Mario Van Peebles as Chilly D
- Richard Fancy as Yves Malmaison
- Ilan Mitchell-Smith as Sebastian Malmaison

== Production and release ==
When the film went into production, Melvin Van Peebles had not made a film since Don't Play Us Cheap. Van Peebles instead worked on theater and television productions, wrote novels and traded on the floor of the American Stock Exchange. His son, Mario Van Peebles, wrote the screenplay for Identity Crisis during the production of Jaws: The Revenge, and offered it to his father. They formed Block & Chip Productions to produce the film. They cowrote a book about the making of the film's production entitled No Identity Crisis. The film was screened at the 1989 Cannes Film Festival. When Melvin Van Peebles was unable to negotiate a theatrical deal at the Festival, it was announced that the film would be released direct-to-video. Mario Van Peebles stated that he never assumed that it would be released theatrically. The film was promoted as a "rap-packed action comedy in the tradition of House Party".
