= Ganja & Hess =

1973 film by Bill Gunn

- Film poster
- Directed by: Bill Gunn
- Written by: Bill Gunn
- Produced by: Chiz Schultz
- Starring: Marlene Clark; Duane Jones
- Cinematography: James E. Hinton
- Edited by: Victor Kanefsky
- Music by: Sam Waymon
- Production company: Kelly-Jordan Enterprises
- Distributed by: Kelly-Jordan Enterprises
- Release date: April 20, 1973
- Running time: 113 minutes; 78 minutes (recut)
- Country: United States
- Language: English
- Budget: $350,000

Ganja & Hess is a 1973 American black horror film written and directed by Bill Gunn and starring Marlene Clark and Duane Jones. The film follows the exploits of anthropologist Dr. Hess Green (Jones), who becomes a vampire after his intelligent but unstable assistant (Gunn) stabs him with an ancient cursed dagger. Green falls in love with his assistant's widow, Ganja (Clark), who learns Green's dark secret.

It is one of only two films in which the lead role was played by Jones, best known for starring in the 1968 film Night of the Living Dead. The film was screened at the 1973 Cannes Film Festival. It was remade by Spike Lee in 2014 as Da Sweet Blood of Jesus.

In 2024, the film was selected for preservation in the United States National Film Registry by the Library of Congress as being "culturally, historically, or aesthetically significant".

== Plot ==
The film follows Dr. Hess Green (Duane Jones), a wealthy, black anthropologist who is doing research on the Myrthians, an ancient African nation of blood drinkers. One night, while staying in Green's lavish mansion, richly decorated with African art, his unstable assistant George Meda (Bill Gunn) threatens suicide. Green successfully talks him down, but later that night Meda attacks and stabs Green with a Myrthian ceremonial dagger, and then kills himself. Green survives, but on discovering the body, drinks Meda's blood; he has become a vampire endowed with immortality and a need for fresh blood. He steals several bags of blood from a doctor's office, but finds that he needs fresh victims.

Soon, Meda's estranged wife, Ganja Meda (Marlene Clark), arrives at Green's house searching for her husband. Green and Meda quickly become lovers, and she moves into Green's mansion. When she unwittingly discovers her husband's corpse frozen in Green's wine cellar she is initially upset, but then agrees to marry her host, who turns her into a vampire as well. Ganja is initially horrified by her new existence, but Green teaches her how to survive. Soon he brings home a young man whom Ganja seduces and then kills. The two vampires dispose of the body in a field on Green's property.

Eventually, Green becomes disillusioned with this life and resolves to return to the Christian church headed by his chauffeur, Reverend Luther Williams (Sam Waymon). Returning home, he kills himself by standing in front of a cross. Ganja, though saddened by his death, lives on, presumably continuing her vampiric lifestyle. The film ends with the young man Ganja had earlier killed rising out of the water, naked but alive, and running toward her, leaping over the corpse of Hess's servant Archie.

== Cast ==
- Marlene Clark as Ganja Meda
- Duane Jones as Dr. Hess Green
- Bill Gunn as George Meda
- Sam Waymon as Reverend Luther Williams
- Leonard Jackson as Archie
- Candece Tarpley as Girl In Bar
- Richard Harrow as Dinner Guest
- John Hoffmeister as Jack Sargent
- Betty Barney as Singer In Church
- Mabel King as Queen of Myrthia

Additionally, postmodern novelist William Gaddis and his wife Judith Thompson appear as extras during a party scene.

== Production ==
In 1972, independent production company Kelly-Jordan Enterprises approached William Gunn, a black artist known at the time as a playwright and stage director, with the idea of making a "black vampire film" with a budget of $350,000. Though Gunn later told a friend, "The last thing I want to do is make a black vampire film," he accepted the project with the intention of using vampirism as metaphor for addiction. The producers' relative inexperience in filmmaking afforded Gunn a high degree of creative control over the film. Filming occurred at Apple Bee Farms (Croton-on-Hudson, New York) and the Brooklyn Museum in New York City. The film had its premiere in 1973 and was selected for the Critics' Week at the Cannes Film Festival that year.

The film's budget was relatively low, which led to creative problem-solving and a distinctive aesthetic. Gunn's artistic choices often defied conventional storytelling techniques, utilizing dreamlike sequences, elliptical editing, and experimental camera work to immerse the audience in the characters' experiences.

== Reception ==
Ganja & Hess received positive reviews. It was screened at the 12th International Critics' Week at Cannes Film Festival, and James Murray of the Amsterdam News hailed it as "the most important Black produced film since Sweet Sweetback's Baadasssss Song."

On the review aggregator website Rotten Tomatoes, 93% of 14 critics' reviews are positive, with an average rating of 7.7/10. Writing in 2014, critic Scott Foundas described the film as a "landmark 1973 indie that used vampirism as an ingenious metaphor for black assimilation, white cultural imperialism and the hypocrisies of organized religion." In 2021, filmmaker and Sundance Institute programmer Adam Piron describes frequently rewatching the film for being "ahead of its time and is still beyond our own." Piron interprets Gunn's approach in this way: "Moving back and forth between quiet interpersonal exchanges and vivid actions prompted by guilt and trauma over the deaths of the two title characters' spouses and their desire to reconnect to the Christian church, Ganja & Hess defies a traditional sense of linear structure. It offers not a plot but, rather, a portrayal of the characters' interactions with one another while trying to live new lives."

== Recut version ==
The film's producers, Kelly and Jordan, were discouraged by the poor box office numbers and unhappy with the film's unusual structure and style. Kelly-Jordan took the film out of distribution and sold it to another company, Heritage Enterprises, which issued a rescored and drastically recut version under the title Blood Couple. This version (disowned by Gunn) was released on VHS under various titles. Despite Heritage Enterprises' compromised release, the original cut was donated to the Museum of Modern Art, whose screenings, according to writer Chris Fujiwara, "helped build [the film's] reputation as a neglected classic of independent African American cinema." The film was restored for release by Kino Lorber through a restoration done by The Museum of Modern Art and support from The Film Foundation, which utilized the best versions of surviving used 35mm prints of the complete version to create a re-mastered negative.

== Legacy ==
=== Remake ===
African-American filmmaker Spike Lee remade Ganja & Hess in 2014 as Da Sweet Blood of Jesus. The script, credited to both Lee and Gunn, has been described as "a remake — at times scene for scene and shot for shot — of Ganja and Hess," while film critic Leila Latif asserted that it was "not one of the stronger entries in [Lee's] filmography." Film critic and programmer Kelli Weston pointed out that while Gunn is "adept at subtlety, nuance, complexity, and allowing women the full depth of their own autonomy and independence," these are not among the creative traits of Spike Lee.

=== Cultural impact ===
Lyrics from Sam Waymon's "The Blood of Thing (Part 2) Shadow of the Cross", a song that appeared in the film, were sampled by the experimental hip-hop trio Clipping in its song "Blood of the Fang". The track appeared on the group’s album There Existed an Addiction to Blood, the album title taken from a line in Waymon's original song.

=== Re-appreciation ===
On 20 April 2023, on its fiftieth anniversary, Latif wrote that Ganja and Hess is "nowadays widely praised" and getting its "due respect" after "having been mistreated...for decades." She went on to claim that the film's "status as a bona fide cult classic has been cemented over the past five years in particular," a development partly due to the fact that "over this period there have been these conversations about representation and the relationship with black people in front of the camera and also behind [it]."

== See also ==
- List of cult films
