= Candace Allen (author) =

American novelist (born 1950)

- Born: 1950 (age 75–76); Boston, Massachusetts, U.S.
- Education: Harvard University (BA)
- Occupations: Novelist, political activist, cultural critic and screenwriter
- Known for: Valaida (2004)
- Notable work: Soul Music: The Pulse of Race and Music (2012)
- Spouse: Simon Rattle (m. 1996; div. 2004)
- Relatives: Billie Allen (aunt)

Candace Allen (born 1950) is an American novelist, political activist, cultural critic and screenwriter, who is based in London. She was the first African-American woman to be a member of the Directors Guild of America. She is the niece of actress and drama coach Billie Allen, and the former wife of British conductor Sir Simon Rattle. As a writer, Allen has published work including the novel Valaida and the non-fiction book Soul Music: The Pulse of Race and Music, and she is a contributor to The Guardian and other newspapers.

== Biography ==
Born in Boston, Massachusetts, in 1950, Candace Allen moved with her family to Stamford, Connecticut, when she was six years old. She received her BA from Harvard University, where in the late 1960s–early '70s she was instrumental in the establishment of the African and African-American Studies Department (now headed by Henry Louis Gates Jr.), before attending the New York University School of Film and Television. She became the first African-American female member of the Directors Guild of America.

In the 1970s, she moved to Los Angeles, California, where for twenty years she worked as an assistant director on feature and television films, and later as a screenwriter. She was a founder of Reel Black Women, a professional organization for African-American women in film. She also set up and ran for four years a counselling group for young black women at Jordan High School in Watts.

Allen moved to the UK in 1994, and was married (8 January 1996 – 2004) to British conductor Simon Rattle. During this marriage, as the wife of a knight, she was entitled to be known as Lady Candace or Lady Rattle.

== Writing career ==
Her first book, a fictionalized biography about the African-American female jazz trumpeter Valaida Snow, was published by Virago Press in 2004. In Valaida, Allen "brought to life an extraordinary woman working in a predominantly male world." Reviewing the novel for JazzTimes, Gwen Ansell wrote: "Allen engages with what it might feel like to think through and play a solo; tour depressing, racist Southern towns; haggle with agents and managers. She treats Snow first and foremost as a musician. The wry, weary wit of backstage conversation rings true and the details play out before a fascinating panorama of pre-1960s jazz and vaudeville stages. In this use of close-up against rich, intensely visual backdrop, in frequent crosscutting and flashback scenes, Allen the screenwriter is very evident. And while the book remains a romance, it's tougher than most and definitely worth reading." As Kevin Le Gendre put it: "Allen astutely balances the heady excitement of Valaida's artistic growth, a trajectory during which she gains the confidence to push her trumpet phrases from 'low notes to mid with shake-butt flourish', with the grim realities of discrimination and exploitation."

Allen's must recent work, the acclaimed Soul Music: the Pulse of Race and Music, published by Gibson Square Press in 2012, has been described as "part-travelogue, part-memoir, part-manifesto". According to the review in the New Statesman, "Allen simply opens her ears and mind in wonder at everything she has seen and heard, rejoicing in and also questioning the values and beliefs that brought her where she is."

Allen writes regularly for The Guardian of London and for other newspapers. In 2018, she was the recipient of a McDowell fellowship for literature. She is a contributor to the 2019 anthology New Daughters of Africa, edited by Margaret Busby.

== Other activities ==
Through the organization "Americans Abroad for Obama", Allen was an active campaigner for the election of Barack Obama in 2008, and subsequently became a frequent commentator on US culture, race and politics on radio and television.

Allen is a board member of the Chineke! Foundation.

== Bibliography ==
- Valaida (London: Virago, 2004), ISBN 1-86049-944-9
- Soul Music: The Pulse of Race and Music (London: Gibson Square Books, 2012), ISBN 978-1-908096-21-0

== Sources ==
- Candace Allen (2004), Valaida (back cover).
