= Whatever Happened to Interracial Love? =

2016 short story collection by Kathleen Collins

- Author: Kathleen Collins
- Language: English
- Genre: Fiction, short story
- Publisher: Ecco Books
- Publication date: 2016
- Publication place: United States
- Pages: 175 pp
- ISBN: 978-0-06-248415-4 (Paperback)

Whatever Happened to Interracial Love? is a posthumous 2016 collection of short stories by author Kathleen Collins. The title story was published by Granta in July 2016.

== Critical reception ==
The New York Times wrote "The best of these stories are a revelation. Ms. Collins had a gift for illuminating what the critic Albert Murray called the 'black intramural class struggle,' and two or three of her stories are so sensitive and sharp and political and sexy I suspect they will be widely anthologized."

Claire Fallon of HuffPost praised the book saying "in poignant, searching scenes and contemplations, readers will be reintroduced to a great and under-appreciated creative talent in Kathleen Collins."
