= Witches Three =

- Dust-jacket from the first edition
- Author: Edited by Fletcher Pratt
- Language: English
- Series: Twayne Triplets
- Genre: Fantasy
- Publisher: Twayne
- Publication date: 1952
- Publication place: United States
- Media type: Print (hardback)
- Pages: 423 pp
- OCLC: 11454764
- Preceded by: The Petrified Planet

Witches Three is an anthology of three original fantasy stories, edited by the uncredited Fletcher Pratt and published in hardcover by Twayne in 1952. No further editions of the anthology were issued, but each of the stories was later republished.

Witches Three was the second and last in the publisher's "Twayne Triplets," a series of science fiction and fantasy anthologies of which each was to be written by a trio of writers on a common theme. The theme for Witches Three is witches and witchcraft.

== Contents ==
- "Introduction" by John Ciardi. the opening piece discusses "the symbolism of witches, in these stories and in folklore generally."
- Conjure Wife, by Fritz Leiber
- "There Shall Be No Darkness", by James Blish
- The Blue Star, by Fletcher Pratt

== Reception ==
Basil Davenport, reviewing the anthology in The New York Times, called the book "an unusually generous omnibus," the contents of which he regarded as "all of high quality." He comments on each of the contributions individually. He praised John Ciardi's "highly perceptive introduction" and finds "real excitement" in Leiber's "comedy-melodrama," highlighting its central idea as "one of those ... of which you say, 'Why, I never thought of that before, but it's obviously perfectly true!" Blish's story he calls "an ironic tragedy of a werewolf in spite of himself." His highest praise, however, is reserved for Pratt's, "[t]he most ambitious and most stimulating of the stories . . . a romance with a scope far beyond that of the common science-fiction novel." In summation, he calls the volume "one more proof that science-fiction is really growing up."

"If you are weary of gleaming spaceships and bug-eyed monsters on distant planets," wrote The Washington Post, "try these comparatively old-fashioned tales of horror and witchcraft. The reviewer called the authors "old hands at conjuring up suspense and fear," and stated that "[a]n idle hour or two in this company can be quite diverting."

The anthology was also reviewed by the editors of The Magazine of Fantasy & Science Fiction in the issue for January 1953, Groff Conklin in Galaxy Science Fiction, March 1953, Sam Moskowitz in Science-Fiction Plus, June 1953, Damon Knight in Science Fiction Adventures, May 1953, and Mark Reinsberg in Imagination, August 1953.
