= Critic's Choice (play) =

Play written by Ira Levin

- First publication (1961)
- Written by: Ira Levin
- Original language: English
- Subject: Theater, marriage, playwriting
- Genre: Comedy
- Setting: New York City apartment

Premiere
- Date premiered: December 14, 1960
- Place premiered: Ethel Barrymore Theatre, USA

Critic's Choice is a play written by Ira Levin.

It opened at the Ethel Barrymore Theatre on December 14, 1960 and ran for 189 performances, closing on May 27, 1961. Levin's inspiration was then-New York Herald Tribune drama critic Walter Kerr and his playwright wife Jean. Otto Preminger directed. Oleg Cassini provided the costumes.

A play in three acts, Critic's Choice tells the story of theater critic Parker Ballantine whose second wife, Angela, writes a play which is produced on Broadway. The play is awful and Parker must decide whether or not to review the play honestly.

Reviewing for The New York Times, Howard Taubman wrote, "Ira Levin's new comedy, which opened at the Ethel Barrymore last night, is not much of a play." And, "Otto Preminger's staging discloses a seasoned hand, although his pacing often turns languid and his ideas for comedy run thin, like the playwright's."

In 1963, the play was made into a film of the same name starring Bob Hope and Lucille Ball.

== Characters ==
- Parker Ballantine: a theater critic in his late 30s or early 40s.
- Angela Ballantine: Parker's second wife; a blonde of twenty-seven or twenty-eight.
- John Ballantine: twelve years old, Parker's son with his first wife Ivy.
- Dion Kapakos: twenty-nine or thirty, the director of Angela's new play.
- Essie: the Ballantine's black maid.
- Charlotte Orr: Angela's mother.
- Ivy London: Parker's first wife, Mother of John. In her mid-to-late thirties.

== Plot summary ==
=== Act one ===
The action takes place in the Ballantines’ Washington Square duplex apartment in Manhattan. Act One opens on Parker, Angela, and John Ballantine at the breakfast table. John reports that the downstairs neighbor, Dr. von Hagedorn, is writing a play. This prompts Angela to announce that she has been thinking about writing a play herself. It would be based on her memories of her Uncle Ben, who ran a rooming house.

Parker is skeptical, but Angela insists and goes off to start work on the play. This gives Parker the idea to write an article for Harper’s magazine entitled "Don’t Write That Play!"—a piece that would discourage amateur playwrights. As Angela begins to write, Parker starts dictating his article into a tape recorder.

Angela completes her play, entitled “The Gingerbread World”, and sends it off to a producer. While awaiting his response, she asks Parker to read it. He does, and tells Angela that the play is horrendous. Angela reacts angrily, but when she phones the producer, S.P. Champlain, she learns that he loves the play and wants to produce it, with Dion Kapakos as director.

Kapakos, however, feels the play needs work. He demands a rewrite, including a change of title, to “A Houseful of Silence.” Among his other artsy and grandiose changes is the addition of a Greek chorus and a new ending: the suicide of Uncle Ben.

The play's first run-through is attended by Parker's son, John. John reports to Parker that the play is the worst thing he's ever seen and questions his father about whether he would really review the play honestly were it to open in New York. John worries that Parker will repeat the mistake he made with the first Mrs. Ballantine: that he'll write a favorable review of a bad play just because it was written by his wife. John is concerned that this will end Parker's marriage to Angela.

Parker assures John that, unlike his first marriage, his and Angela's is a strong one and secure enough to weather an honest review. Parker explains that were he to lie about Angela's play, he would lose his own self-respect and become angry with Angela and the whole world as a result.

As Angela prepares to depart with Dion to New Haven and Boston for the out-of-town try-outs of “A Houseful of Silence,” they learn that Parker intends to review the play in New York. Angela becomes furious. She storms out of the apartment after recriminating with Parker over writing the Harper's piece. Parker sits down with his tape recorder and begins to erase the entire tape of his article as the curtain falls on Act One.

=== Act two ===
Charlotte, Angela's mother, has been staying in the apartment to cook for Parker and John while Angela is out of town. Charlotte begs Parker to give the play a positive review for the sake of the marriage.

The doorbell rings and Ivy London, Parker's first wife, appears. She has learned, from a phone call to Parker's maid, that Angela is out of town. Angela reports to Parker that she has just come from Boston where she was in the same hotel as Angela and Dion and she believes that the two are having an affair. Ivy also tells Parker that she still love him. Ivy leaves and Charlotte re-enters. Charlotte admits she's been eavesdropping on the conversation with Ivy, and tells Parker she believe what Ivy has reported: that it is likely that Angela and Dion are having an affair. Charlotte calls Parker naïve for not believing the rumor and warns him that if he gives Angela's play a bad review that night, he will lose Angela forever.

Angela and Dion return to the apartment before going to the theater for the opening of the show. Once again, Angela begs Parker not to review the play. She reminds Parker that he lied about Ivy's bad performances six times while Parker was married to Ivy. She tells Parker that Dion loves her. She repeats Parker's words that during the opening of the play they are not husband and wife, but critic and playwright. She asks whether she should even come home after the play that night.

Parker finally backs down, gives his tickets back to Angela, and says he won't review the play after all. Angela and Dion leave for the theater and Parker begins to drink heavily. John becomes angry at Parker for going back on his word about reviewing the play and about staying honest to himself. Parker continues to drink, calls Ivy, and invites her to the apartment to give him a backrub.

=== Act Three ===
Ivy is busy making dinner for Parker as he continues to drink. Ivy again proclaims her love to Parker and tells him they will get back together. Parker becomes increasingly drunk and maudlin about not being true to his word about doing his job as a critic regardless of Angela's connection with the play. Finally, Parker decides he must review the play and he rushes out to catch a cab to the theater. Ivy leaves.

Charlotte and John return from the opening night party discussing how bad the play was. Angela and Dion storm in carrying the newspaper reviews. Angela tells Charlotte that Parker reviewed the play after all and now Angela is moving out and going to live with Dion.

Parker, now sober, returns home and enters with Ivy while John is reading Parker's review, “Opening Night Report”. Angela grabs her suitcase and readies to leave the apartment, but Parker insists that she listen to him. Parker then apologizes for making fun of Angela when she first began to write the play, and for not going to New Haven and Boston to make suggestions to improve it. He tells her that if she did have an affair with Dion in Boston then he, Parker, is to blame for not having traveled there with her. He begs her forgiveness, but goes on to say that “A Houseful of Silence” was an awful play, he was right to give it a bad review, and that Angela should not try to keep Parker from doing his work as a critic. He promises that if Angela writes another play he will help her, and he asks her to stay with him. Angela, charmed, relents. Dion and Ivy leave together. Angela and Parker retreat to the bedroom.

== Opening night cast ==
- Henry Fonda as Parker Ballantine
- Eddie Hodges as John Ballantine
- Georgann Johnson as Angela Ballantine
- Murray Hamilton as Dion Kapakos
- Billie Allen as Essie
- Mildred Natwick as Charlotte Orr
- Virginia Gilmore as Ivy London
