= Black Mamba (film) =

1974 Filipino horror film

- Directed by: George Rowe
- Starring: John Ashley; Marlene Clark; Pilar Pilapil; Eddie Garcia
- Release date: 1974
- Country: Philippines
- Language: English

Black Mamba is a 1974 horror film directed by George Rowe and starring John Ashley, Marlene Clark, Pilar Pilapil, and Eddie Garcia.

== Premise ==
An American doctor (Ashley) falls for a young widow (Pilapil) while treating the citizens of a small village in the Philippines. He helps the woman fight a voodoo curse which has been put on her by a witch (Clark) who can turn into a python. She intends for a young child to be her next victim. The doctor tries to stop her.

== Cast ==
- John Ashley
- Marlene Clark
- Pilar Pilapil
- Eddie Garcia

== Production ==
The film is notorious for depicting an autopsy performed on a real human corpse, which was exhumed from one of the local prisons and used on film. Ashley once described it as "a wild film, very graphic, very gory."

The film was originally to be titled Witchcraft. Ashley said that he made it just before his involvement in Apocalypse Now (1979), which would be his last project in the Philippines. According to Ashley the film was financed by a Chinese business man; in a 1992 interview, Ashley said of the film industry of the Philippines, "You will get a guy who has some money and decides he wants to make a movie. And he'll make one movie and go broke, and you'll never hear from him again. That's basically the case with the man who was behind Black Mamba."

== Release ==
Black Mamba was not widely screened. The film was released in the Philippines but not the US. A person bought it and took it to Hong Kong to redub it but ran out of money.

The film remained unreleased until after Ashley's death in 1997.
