= Starving (play) =

2005 play by S. M. Shephard-Massat

- Original language: English
- Written by: S. M. Shephard-Massat
- Subject: African-American life
- Genre: Satire
- Setting: Atlanta, Georgia, 1950

Premiere
- Date: November 14, 2005
- Place: Woolly Mammoth Theatre Company, Washington, D.C.

Starving is a play by S. M. Shephard-Massat. The play premiered in 2005 at the Woolly Mammoth Theatre Company and won the 2006 Charles MacArthur Award for Outstanding New Play or Musical.

== Plot ==
Starving is set in Atlanta, Georgia during the 1950s and takes place in an apartment building within a Black neighborhood. The play follows characters whose lives intersect as they navigate personal ambition, generational conflict, violence, and questions of intellect and survival within a racially segregated society.

== Production history ==
=== Washington, D.C. (2005) ===
Starving received its world premiere at the Woolly Mammoth Theatre Company in Washington, D.C., running from November 14 through December 18, 2005. The production was directed by Seret Scott.

=== New York City (2011) ===
In September 2011, Starving was presented as part of The Public Theater’s New Work Now series. The production was directed by Delroy Lindo and was performed on Friday, September 16, 2011.

== Awards ==
In 2006, Starving won the Charles MacArthur Award for Outstanding New Play or Musical at the Helen Hayes Awards.

== Reception ==
The original production of Starving was reviewed by Variety, The Washington Post, and The Washington Times.
