= Tom Chadbon =

English actor (1946–2026)

- Born: Thomas Richard Chadbon; 27 February 1946; Luton, Bedfordshire, England
- Died: 18 July 2026 (aged 80)
- Occupation: Actor
- Years active: 1967–2017
- Spouses: Deborah Elspeth Leathers (m. 1966; div. 1970) Jane Hennessy (m. 1977)

Thomas Richard Chadbon (27 February 1946 – 18 July 2026) was an English actor. He featured on British television and though principally a character actor, he has occasionally had leading or recurring roles.

== Life and career ==
Thomas Richard Chadbon was born in Luton, Bedfordshire, England on 27 February 1946, to Thomas and Josie Chabdon.

He starred in all 10 episodes of Crown Prosecutor (1995), playing Lenny Monk, and he had substantial recurring roles in Chancer, The Liver Birds, Where the Heart Is, Wire in the Blood, and the 23rd series of Casualty (as Professor Henry Williams).

His appearances on British television shows included: Out of the Unknown, The Stone Tape, Softly, Softly, Blake's 7, Within These Walls, Special Branch, Tales of the Unexpected, The Memoirs of Sherlock Holmes, Sherlock Holmes and the Leading Lady, The New Statesman, Between the Lines, Peak Practice, Casualty, Hetty Wainthropp Investigates, Silent Witness, The Bill, Holby City, Heartbeat, Foyle's War, Midsomer Murders, Rebecca, Taggart, Peep Show, and Father Brown.

Chadbon played Duggan in the Doctor Who serial City of Death (1979) and returned to Doctor Who as Merdeen in the 1986 serial The Mysterious Planet. Chadbon has also been an occasional guest star in Big Finish audio productions. Most notably, he played the recurring character of Will in the second series of the Sarah Jane Smith audio adventures. He also had a featured guest role in No More Lies, during Paul McGann's 2007 broadcast season on BBC Radio 7. He also reprised the role of Del Grant for the Blake's 7 audio series for Big Finish.

His film work included The Alf Garnett Saga (1972), The Beast Must Die (1974), Juggernaut (1974), Tess (1979), Coming Out of the Ice (1982), Dance with a Stranger (1985), Shooting Fish (1997), and Casino Royale (2006).

Chadbon died on 18 July 2026, aged 80.

== Selected filmography ==
- The Alf Garnett Saga (1972) – Jim
- The Beast Must Die (1974) – Paul Foote
- Juggernaut (1974) – Juggernaut's Contact
- Electric Eskimo (1979)
- Tess (1979) – Cuthbert Clare
- Coming Out of the Ice (1982) – Samsonov
- Strangers and Brothers (1984) – Sir Douglas Osbaldiston
- Dance with a Stranger (1985) – Anthony Findlater
- Sherlock Holmes and the Leading Lady (1991) – Zygovich
- Shooting Fish (1997) – Mr. Greenaway
- Dragons: A Fantasy Made Real (2004) - Museum Curator
- Julian Fellowes Investigates: A Most Mysterious Murder (2005) - Edmund Duff
- Casino Royale (2006) – Stockbroker
- Game of Thrones, "The Dragon and the Wolf" (2017) - High Septon Maynard
