= Stop! (1970 film) =

1970 drama film by Bill Gunn

- Film poster
- Directed by: Bill Gunn
- Written by: Bill Gunn
- Produced by: Paul M. Heller
- Starring: Edward Michael Bell; Linda Marsh; Richard Dow; Marlene Clark; John Hoffmeister; Anna Marie Aries
- Cinematography: Owen Roizman
- Edited by: Sam Ornstein
- Music by: Fred Myrow
- Production company: Warner Bros.
- Distributed by: Warner Bros.
- Release date: 1970
- Running time: 89 minutes
- Country: United States
- Language: English

Stop! is a 1970 American independent drama film that was once considered a lost film. It was written and directed by Bill Gunn. It stars Edward Michael Bell, Linda Marsh, Richard Dow, Marlene Clark, John Hoffmeister, and Anna Marie Aries.

== Plot summary ==
Michael and Lee are a married couple whose relationship is in turmoil. While on vacation in San Juan, Puerto Rico, they meet another couple (Richard and Marlene). Gradually, they become a foursome, mingling with group sex, as well as separate heterosexual and homosexual encounters.

== Cast ==
- Edward Michael Bell as Michael
- Linda Marsh as Lee
- Richard Dow as Richard
- Marlene Clark as Marlene
- John Hoffmeister as John
- Anna Marie Aries as Ellen

== Release ==
Warner Bros. refused to release the X-rated film theatrically. It was eventually shown periodically from 1970 onward, albeit without a proper release. Its only existing copy is a grainy VHS rip.
