= Alfred Prettyman =

American publisher and educator

Alfred E. Prettyman
- Born: Alfred Emerson Prettyman; February 15, 1935 (age 91); Baltimore, Maryland, U.S.
- Education: Hamilton College; Cornell University; Baruch College
- Occupations: Co-founder of the Society for the Study of Africana Philosophy; Co-founder of Pretty-Steady Productions, Inc. Adjunct Professor at Ramapo College

Alfred E. Prettyman (born February 15, 1935) is an American publisher.

== Early life and education ==
Alfred E. Prettyman was born in February 1935, in Baltimore, Maryland. He is one of five children of Edward Prettyman, the conductor of the Colored Park Band #1 of Baltimore, and Helen Prettyman, teacher. Prettyman attended Douglass High School from which he graduated at age 16. While in high school he also made several appearances on WAAM, now known as WJZ-TV, as a singer on the High Times Program, with host Tommy Dukehart and the afternoon sports and news shows. His appearances on WAAM lead to appearances on the radio and television shows of Paul Whiteman.

A vocalist, his life in music has included performances as a recitalist and soloist. In 1962 at New York's Henry Street Playhouse Opera Workshop, under the direction of Felix Popper, assistant conductor of the New York City Opera, he sang the role of Aeneas to Rose Bampton's Dido in a concert version of Henry Purcell's Dido and Aeneas. The following year he created the role of Ernesto for the American premiere of Joseph Haydn's opera Die Welt Auf Dem Monde (The World of the Moon), under Popper's direction. Winner of a N.Y. State Singing Teachers Award, Bidu Sayao, President, his Carnegie Hall debut was well received in The New York Times. Prettyman left Baltimore to attend Hamilton College, to study philosophy. For four years there, he was the featured baritone soloist of the men's choir led by John L. Baldwin. Later he pursued graduate studies at Cornell University; New School for Social Research; Baruch College, CUNY; and the Intercultural Communications Institute (ICI), Pacific University, Portland, Oregon.

== Personal life ==
Prettyman met his first wife, Julia Poussaint, through a college friend. They are parents of two children, Meryl and Evan.

Alfred Prettyman's late wife, Kathleen Conwell Prettyman, aka Kathleen Collins (1942–1988) was a celebrated fiction writer, playwright, filmmaker, and educator. Since 1959 Alfred Prettyman has been a resident of New York City where he currently resides with his wife, curator and arts administrator, Susan Stedman.

== Civil rights activities ==
When Executive Secretary for the Student Nonviolent Coordinating Committee (SNCC), New York Office, Poussaint made trips to the South with other members of the committee to participate in the Civil Rights Movement. Instead of returning to the South, Prettyman contributed to the Civil Rights Movement through book publishing, initially at Harper & Row, Inc. (1963–71) where he was Executive Editor for the Social and Behavioral Sciences and Humanities, College Department, as well as Consultant for History in the Elementary and Secondary School Book Department, in Evanston, Illinois, and Senior Editor, Trade Non-fiction. At Harper & Row he also was Editor-Manager of a series of original titles and scholarly reprints for the new imprint J & J Harper Books, the first books to be printed on acid-free paper. Prettyman called out the publishing industry for being a “sexist and racist club.”

Prettyman played a role in changing the content of junior and senior high and college textbooks to include African Americans and Native Americans. In 1969, Prettyman also started his own publishing company, Emerson Hall Publishers, Inc., along with partners Bill Mayo and William Peters. The company focused on publishing work by diverse authors that dealt with social and behavioral science issues primarily as well as drama, poetry and fiction of the Black experience. He also was an editor for psychologist Dr. Kenneth B. Clark's Metropolitan Applied Research Corporation (MARC). In 1980-83 he became Editor-Manager of New Press, McGraw Hill Publishers.

== Higher education ==
Prettyman's four-decade career in higher education began on the English faculty of Livingston College, Rutgers University from 1973-80, where he taught American, African American, and 17th-century English literature, Shakespeare, and the history of Western drama. Later, as assistant professor, he taught literature and social science at Orange County Community College, 1989–90, and Rockland Community College, State University of New York, 1989- 98.

Since 1999 he has been adjunct assistant professor, school of social science and human services, Ramapo College of New Jersey. A communications consultant during the 1980s, Prettyman directed public relations for Local Initiatives Support Corporation (LISC), public affairs and community relations for New York City Department of Juvenile Justice and Union Theological Seminary, NY.

== Later life ==
A co-chair of literature for the New York State Council on the Arts (1970) he was a consultant for the National Endowment for the Humanities (1970–73), the National Endowment for the Arts (1970–72), and the Asia Society. In 1980 Prettyman served as elector, National Medal of Literature and judge for the National Book Awards. He served on the editorial board for Christianity & Crisis magazine, was chairman of the Minority Publishers’ Committee of the Council on Interracial Books for Children, and was a member of PEN and Pi Delta Epsilon (Journalism). As alumnus trustee he served on the board of Hamilton College. His other board services included the Berkshire Farm Center and Services for Youth, NY and Nyack Center (board chair and executive director), Nyack, NY. Since 2003 he has been chairman of the board of the Ophelia J. Berry Fund, Inc, dba Pathways to College.

Since 1976 he has continued to hold meetings in his apartment of the Society for the Study of Africana Philosophy (SSAP). With Albert E. Blumberg (1906–1997), a fellow tennis player, philosopher, political activist, and a native of Baltimore, Prettyman co-founded SSAP as an open forum for the discussion of philosophical ideas and to provide a network of support for young African American philosophers and a place for lay intellectuals to exchange ideas with professional academics in an informal setting.

Prettyman is a frequent presenter for the (SAAP), of which he is a member. He is also a member of the Organization of American Historians (OAH). Author of numerous articles and lecturer in education, social and political thought, Prettyman presented “The New ‘Redeemers’ Recent Conservative and Liberal Assaults on Minority Rights in the U.S.” as the W.E.B. DuBois Lecturer, Humboldt University, Berlin, Germany in 2005 and presented “Compulsion and Persuasion in a Democracy of Split-Levels” at Opole University, Poland in 2013. In Pioneers of Africana Philosophy, The Center for the Humanities, City University of New York, 2021, he presented “Rending the Veil: How Do We See Each Other.” The film, “Ogun’s Fire: The Sculpture of Melvin Edwards,” (PrettySteady Productions) of which he was Executive Producer, was selected Best Film/Video in the Fine Arts XV Black International Cinema Festival 2000, Germany and USA.

== Bibliography ==
- Prettyman, Alfred E. (Editor, publisher) The Journal. New York Society for the Study of Black Philosophy. 1980. Vol I, No 1.
- Prettyman, Alfred E. “Paul Robeson: What Manner of Humanist.?” Proceedings, Humanism in the Twentieth Century: Paul Robeson. New Brunswick, NJ: Rutgers University, 1994.
- Prettyman, Alfred E. and Minter, Thomas K., “The History of African American Education” and Prettyman, Alfred E. “The History of African American Colleges,” in The Encyclopedia of African American Culture and History, Vol. 2. New York: Macmillan Publishing Co., 1995.
- Prettyman, Alfred E. “Frederick Douglass: A Developing Self,” in The Teachers and Writers Guide to Frederick Douglass. New York: Teachers and Writers Collaborative, 1996.
- Prettyman, Alfred E. (ed.) U.S.: National Civics in a Mosaic Democracy, New York: McGraw-Hill, 1995, Revised, 1997.
- Prettyman, Alfred E. “Troubling Presences and Misrecognitions” Cross Currents, Winter 1998/1999.
- Prettyman, Alfred E. (ed.) U.S.: The Intercultural Nation, 2ND Edition, New York: McGraw-Hill, 1999.
- Prettyman, Alfred E. “Civil Smother: Folkways of Renewed Racism in the United States,” in Pragmatism and the Problem of Race, B.E. Lawson and D.F. Koch, (eds.) Bloomington: Indiana University Press, 2003.
- The Haverford Discussions, A Black Integrationist Manifesto for Racial Justice. Virginia, 2013. M. Lackey, (ed.). Afterword by Alfred E. Prettyman, Editor of the original transcriptions of the 1969 Discussions. University of VA Press, 2013.
- Prettyman, Alfred E. “Compulsion and Persuasion in a Democracy of Split-Levels,” in Persuasion and Compulsion in Democracy, J. A. K Kegley and K. P. Skowronski,( eds,), New York, Plymouth, UK: Lexington Books, 2013.
