= Night of the Eagle =

1962 British horror film directed by Sidney Hayers

- British film poster
- Directed by: Sidney Hayers
- Screenplay by: Charles Beaumont; Richard Matheson; George Baxt
- Based on: Conjure Wife (1943 novel) by Fritz Leiber
- Produced by: Albert Fennell
- Starring: Peter Wyngarde; Janet Blair; Margaret Johnston
- Cinematography: Reginald Wyer
- Edited by: Ralph Sheldon
- Music by: William Alwyn
- Production company: Independent Artists
- Distributed by: Anglo-Amalgamated (UK); American International Pictures (US)
- Release dates: 25 April 1962 (US); 11 May 1962 (UK)
- Running time: 90 minutes
- Country: United Kingdom
- Language: English
- Budget: £50,000
- Box office: US$3 million

Night of the Eagle (released in the United States as Burn, Witch, Burn, also known as Conjure Wife) is a 1962 British horror film directed by Sidney Hayers, adapted by Charles Beaumont, Richard Matheson, and George Baxt from the 1943 novel Conjure Wife by Fritz Leiber. It stars Peter Wyngarde, Janet Blair, and Margaret Johnston. Its plot follows an esteemed sociology professor who discovers that his professional achievements and successes are the result of his wife practising witchcraft.

It was financed and distributed by Anglo-Amalgamated and American International Pictures, during a period in which the two companies co-produced a number of films together. It first premiered in the United States on April 25, 1962, and in the United Kingdom on May 11.

== Plot ==
Norman Taylor is a psychology professor lecturing about belief systems and superstition at an English university. After a scene in which his American wife, Tansy, searches frantically and finds a poppet left by a jealous work rival, he discovers that Tansy is practising obeah, referred to in the film as "conjure magic", which she learned in Jamaica. She insists that her charms have been responsible for his rapid advancement in his academic career and for his general well-being. A firm rationalist, Norman is angered by her acceptance of superstition. He forces her to burn all her magical paraphernalia.

Almost immediately things start to go wrong: a female student accuses Norman of rape, her boyfriend threatens him with violence, and someone tries to break into the Taylors' home during a thunderstorm. Tansy, willing to sacrifice her life for her husband's safety, almost drowns herself and is only saved at the last minute by Norman giving in to the practices he despises.

Tansy attacks him with a knife while in a trance, but Norman disarms her and locks her in her room. Her limping walk during the attack gives Norman a clue to the person responsible for his ill luck: university secretary Flora Carr, the wife of Lindsay whose career had stalled in favour of Norman's. Flora uses witchcraft to set fire to the Taylor home with Tansy trapped inside.

Using a form of auditory hypnosis over a loudspeaker system, Flora convinces Norman that a giant stone eagle perching at the top of the university chapel has come to life to attack him. Lindsay arrives at the office and turns off the loudspeaker, and the illusory eagle vanishes. Tansy escapes her burning home and rejoins her no longer sceptical husband. On their way out of the campus, Lindsay sees the chapel's heavy doors are ajar (left thus by Norman in his "escape" from the eagle), and insists on securing them despite Flora's protests. As she waits for him, the eagle statue falls from the roof and kills her.

== Cast ==
- Peter Wyngarde as Norman Taylor
- Janet Blair as Tansy Taylor
- Margaret Johnston as Flora Carr
- Anthony Nicholls as Harvey Sawtelle
- Colin Gordon as Lindsay Carr
- Kathleen Byron as Evelyn Sawtelle
- Reginald Beckwith as Harold Gunnison
- Jessica Dunning as Hilda Gunnison
- Judith Stott as Margaret Abbott
- Bill Mitchell as Fred Jennings
- Norman Bird as Doctor
- George Roubicek as Cleaner
- Paul Frees as prologue narrator (US version only)

== Production ==
=== Writing ===
Night of the Eagle is the second of three film adaptations of Fritz Leiber's Conjure Wife, preceded by Weird Woman (1944) and followed by Witches' Brew (1980).

Richard Matheson and Charles Beaumont were admirers of the novel and decided to adapt it. They were paid $5,000 each by James H. Nicholson of AIP, who passed the project over to AIP's regular co-producers, Anglo-Amalgamated in England. They agreed to finance, allocating the movie to Independent Artists to produce. Producer Albert Fennell bought in George Baxt to work on the script. The original script (commenced by Matheson and completed by Beaumont) was published in the Gauntlet Press edition of He Is Legend, a Matheson tribute anthology, but not in the subsequent paperback.

=== Casting ===
Part of the deal of Anglo-Amalgamated financing was that a star play the lead; Peter Cushing was originally meant to star but decided to make Captain Clegg for Hammer instead. Musical comedy star Janet Blair came on board and the male lead was rumoured to have been offered to both Peter Finch and Cushing; Finch turned down the part and Cushing was unwell at the time the film was due to go into production. Peter Wyngarde was cast at the last minute.

=== Filming ===
Filming took place over six weeks, mainly on-location in Cornwall (Porthcurno and St Just in Penwith) and at Elstree Studios. The scenes set at the (fictional) university were filmed at Taplow Court in Buckinghamshire.

== Release ==
The film was acquired for North American distribution by American International Pictures, who released it under the alternative title Burn, Witch, Burn, premiering in Buffalo, New York on 25 April 1962. Film prints for the American release were preceded by a narrated prologue in which the voice of Paul Frees was heard to intone a spell to protect the audience members from evil. For protection, American theatre audiences were given a special pack of salt and words to an ancient incantation.

The film opened in the United Kingdom under its original title, Night of the Eagle, on 11 May 1962. While the film was accessible to an under-aged audience in the US, it was rated "X" (adults only) in the UK on its initial release. It was later re-rated 15, then 12 for UK home video releases.

=== Home media ===
In 2007, Optimum Releasing released Night of the Eagle on DVD in the United Kingdom. The MGM Limited Edition Collection released the Burn, Witch, Burn! version in the United States on 16 May 2011.

Out of print are the 1995 US Image DVD, American-Laserdisc and VHS video titled Burn, Witch, Burn!, the British DVD-Box titled Horror Classics, consisting of The Masque of the Red Death, Night of the Eagle and Zoltan...Hound Of Dracula, and the British VHS video Night of the Eagle.

Kino Lorber released Burn, Witch, Burn on Blu-ray in the United States on 18 August 2015. This release features both versions of the film, featuring the original Night of the Eagle opening, as well as the Paul Frees-narrated opening prologue released in the United States under the Burn, Witch, Burn title. Kino Lorber reissued the Blu-ray in a special edition on 1 October 2024.

== Reception ==
=== Box office ===
In the United States, the film grossed approximately $3 million.

=== Critical response ===
The Monthly Film Bulletin wrote:

The fact that three screenwriters have worked on its expansion possibly explains why the film is not all one had hoped it might be. The producers have had little success making the subject-matter believable, for all that much of the action is underplayed, and it is impossible to accept the situation of two presumably intelligent women succumbing to the lure of black magic. But director Sidney Hayer's stage management is fresh and exciting for the most part, skilful in its reliance on suggestion, naggingly effective as a study of psychic attack. Peter Wyngarde succeeds in conveying the young professor's confusion and doubt, while Margaret Johnston enjoys herself along broader lines as the wild-eyed, madly frustrated Flora.

The New York Times called Night of the Eagle "quite the most effective 'supernatural' thriller since Village of the Damned" and perhaps the "best outright goose-pimpler dealing specifically with witchcraft since I Walked with a Zombie...in 1943" and noted:

Simply as a suspense yarn, blending lurid conjecture and brisk reality, growing chillier by the minute, and finally whipping up an ice-cold crescendo of fright, the result is admirable. Excellently photographed (not a single "frame" is wasted), and cunningly directed by Sidney Hayers, the incidents gather a pounding, graphic drive that is diabolically teasing. The climax is a nightmarish hair-curler but, we maintain, entirely logical within the context.

Jonathan Rosenbaum of the Chicago Reader called the film "atmospheric and underplayed in the tradition of Val Lewton" and, despite judging Sidney Hayers' direction as "needlessly rhetorical at times", "eerily effective".

Film historian William K. Everson, though critical of Night of the Eagle for its predictability, praised the film for its story and Janet Blair's performance.

David Pirie of Time Out magazine, while not happy with the casting of Janet Blair, acknowledged Hayers' direction "an almost Wellesian flourish" and the script being "structured with incredible tightness".

Author S. T. Joshi declared it particularly notable for its realistic portrayal of campus politics.

=== Accolades ===
In 1963 Night of the Eagle was nominated for the Hugo Award for Best Dramatic Presentation.

== Sources ==
- Craig, Rob (2019). American International Pictures: A Comprehensive Filmography. Jefferson, North Carolina: McFarland. ISBN 978-1-476-66631-0.
- Everson, William K. (1974). Classics of the Horror Film. Citadel Press. ISBN 978-0-806-50437-7.
- Hamilton, John (2013). X-Cert: The British Independent Horror Film. Baltimore, Maryland: Midnight Marquee Press. ISBN 978-1-936-16840-8.
- Joshi, S. T. (2007). Icons of Horror and the Supernatural: An Encyclopedia of Our Worst Nightmares. Vol. 2. Westport, Connecticut: Greenwood Publishing Group. p. 716. ISBN 978-0-313-33782-6.
