= Tansy cake =

Medieval pancake

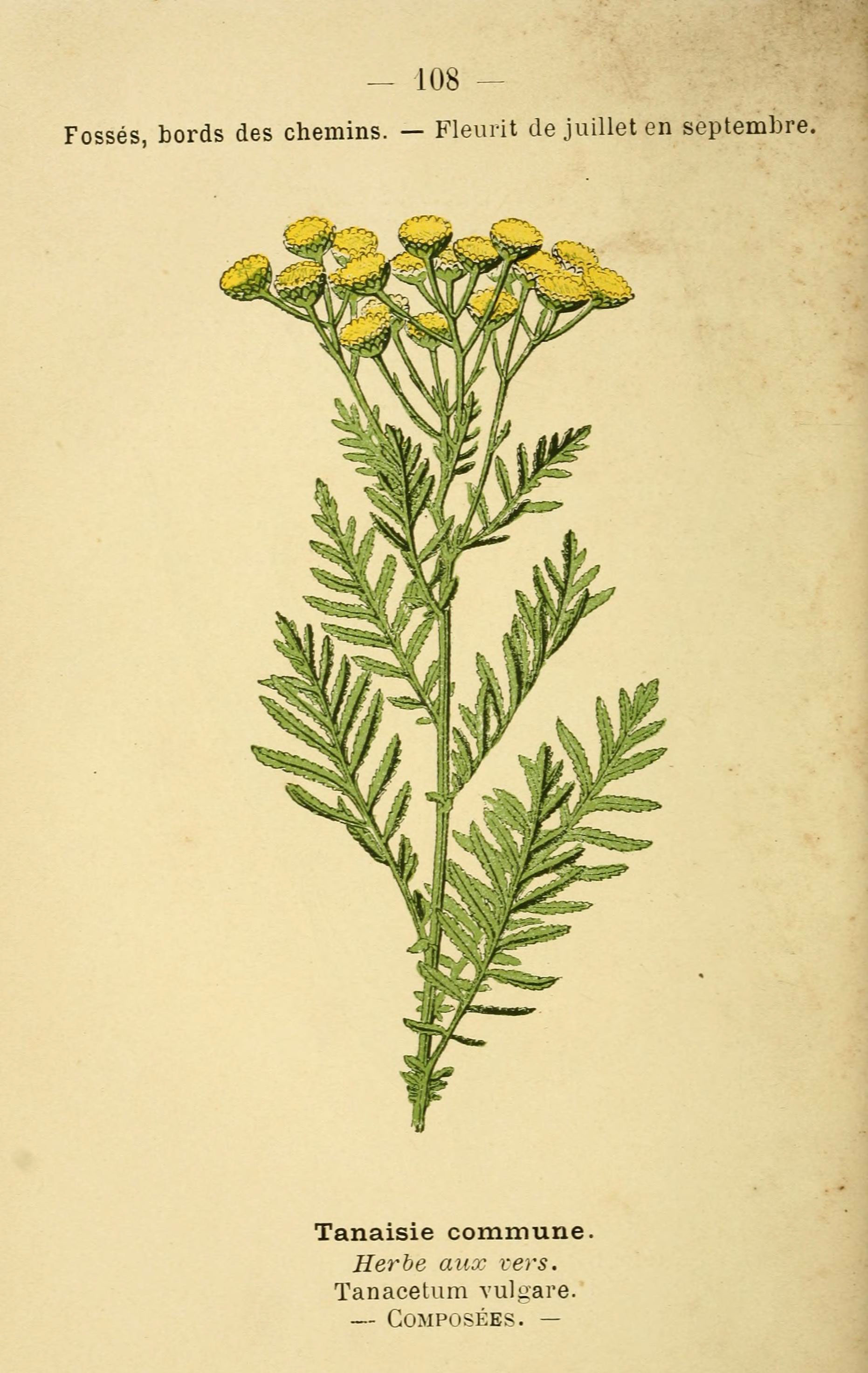
The tansy plant

Tansy was a traditional Easter food in medieval English cuisine. Its name came from the tansy plant. The simplest version of the recipe was made by baking a batter flavored with green tansy juice. Later recipes, like the one from the 16th-century Good Housewife's Handbook added more ingredients like parsley, feverfew and violets to an egg batter that was fried like pancakes, though with a slightly green coloring from the addition of tansy and other herbs. Baked tansy could also be given a green color by adding spinach juice. An 18th-century recipe from The Compleat Housewife added sack to the batter and sweetened the fried tansies with gooseberries and a topping of crushed sugar.

Cakes and wine were a common feature of Easter traditions. Some 19th-century authors believed that the tradition of eating tansy cakes, which had a sweet and bitter flavor, was connected to Jewish traditions of eating cakes made with bitter herbs. Sometimes the tansy was closer to a pudding than a pancake, like Hannah Glasse's 18th-century recipe in the Art of Cookery, an elaborate dish with Naples biscuits, butter, cream, blanched almonds, eggs, grated bread, rose water, orange blossom water and other spices and sweeteners.
