= Bill Gunn (writer) =

American dramatist (1934–1989)

- Born: William Harrison Gunn; July 15, 1934; Philadelphia, Pennsylvania, U.S.
- Died: April 5, 1989 (aged 54); Nyack, New York, U.S.
- Occupations: Writer, director, actor

William Harrison Gunn (July 15, 1934 – April 5, 1989) was an American playwright, novelist, actor and film director. His 1973 cult classic horror film Ganja & Hess was chosen as one of ten best American films of the decade at the Cannes Film Festival, 1973. In The New Yorker, film critic Richard Brody described him as being "a visionary filmmaker left on the sidelines of the most ostensibly liberated period of American filmmaking." Filmmaker Spike Lee had said that Gunn is "one of the most under-appreciated filmmakers of his time." Gunn's drama Johnnas won an Emmy Award in 1972.

== Career ==
A native of Philadelphia, Gunn wrote more than 29 plays during his lifetime. He also authored two novels and wrote several produced screenplays. In 1950, Gunn studied acting with Mira Rostova in New York's East Village. In 1954, he played a role in the Broadway production of The Immoralist with James Dean. Along with Dean, he joined a social circle that included Montgomery Clift, Eartha Kitt, and Marlon Brando. Gunn shared a house in Nyack, New York with Sam Waymon, brother of singer Nina Simone, who also wrote the musical score for Ganja & Hess. Gunn's directorial debut would have been Stop! (1970), which was funded by Warner Bros. under the plan of being the second studio film directed by an African American. It was intended as a drama involving two couples becoming involved with each other within homosexual and interracial sexual contact alongside surreal undertones. The film was shelved by the studio before release, and the studio later claimed they did not have the print in their archives. A 35mm print was shown at a retrospective upon Gunn's death, and a VHS copy of the film exists (found by Jack Hoffmeister, co-star of the film). He was also an advocate and friend of filmmaker and writer Kathleen Collins, playing a role in her film Losing Ground.

== Death and legacy ==
He died when he was 54 years old from encephalitis at a Nyack, New York hospital the day before his play The Forbidden City opened at the Public Theater in New York City.

In 2021, an exhibition entitled "Till They Listen: Bill Gunn Directs America", dedicated to the work and legacy of Bill Gunn, was shown at the New York gallery Artists Space. The program series was organized by Gunn's artistic collaborators and scholars including, Hilton Als, Jake Perlin, Sam Waymon, Nicholas Forster, Awoye Timpo, Chiz Schultz, and Ishmael Reed. In 2021, Timpo adapted Gunn's play Black Picture Show for film in the form of a staged reading.

== Bibliography ==
=== Plays ===
- Marcus in the High Grass (1959) – produced by Theatre Guild.
- Johnnas (1968) – produced in New York City at Chelsea Theatre.
- Black Picture Show (1975) – produced in New York City at Vivian Beaumont Theater.
- Rhinestone (musical; based on the novel Rhinestone Sharecropping) (1982) – produced in New York City at Richard Allen Cultural Center.
- The Forbidden City (1989) – produced in New York City at The Public Theater.

=== Screenplays ===
- Stop! (1969) (never released), Warner Bros.
- The Angel Levine (1970) (with Ronald Ribman; adaptation of the novel by Bernard Malamud), United Artists.
- The Landlord (1970) (adaptation of the 1966 novel by Kristin Hunter), United Artists.
- Ganja and Hess (1973), Kelly-Jordan Enterprises, re-edited and released under title Blood Couple, Heritage Enterprises.
- The Greatest (1977) (uncredited), original script, Columbia Pictures.

=== Television screenplays ===
- Johnnas (1972), National Broadcasting Company (NBC).
- The Alberta Hunter Story (1982) (co-written with Chris Albertson) (never completed), Southern Pictures (UK).

=== Novels ===
- All the Rest Have Died (1964), Delacorte (New York).
- Rhinestone Sharecropping (1981), Reed, Cannon, ISBN 0-918408-19-9, ISBN 978-0-918408-19-8.

== Filmography ==
=== As director ===
Year	Film	Notes
1970	Stop!	
1973	Ganja & Hess	A.K.A. Black Evil, Black Vampire (U.S. video title), Blackout: The Moment of Terror, Blood Couple (cut version), Double Possession and Vampires of Harlem
1980	Personal Problems	

=== As film actor ===
Year	Title	Role	Notes
1957	Crossroads	Roy	Short; Uncredited
1959	The Sound and the Fury	T.P., Dilsey's Grandson	
1962	The Interns	Rosco	Uncredited
1966	Penelope	Sergeant Rothschild	
1973	Ganja & Hess	George Meda	
1982	Losing Ground	Victor Rogers	
1988	Black Vampire	Dr. Matara	Final film role Re-edit of Ganja & Hess

=== As television actor ===
Year	Title	Role	Notes
1957	Look Up and Live	George	Episode: "No Man Is an Island"
1961	Route 66	Hank Plummer	Episode: "Goodnight Sweet Blues"
1961	Naked City	Al Norbert	Episode: "Which Is Joseph Creeley?"
1962	The Defenders	Frank Reilly	Episode: "The Tarnished Cross"
1962	Stoney Burke	Toby / Bud Sutter	2 episodes
1963	The Outer Limits	Lieutenant James P. Willowmore	Episode: "Nightmare"
1964	The Man from U.N.C.L.E.	Namana	Episode: "The Double Affair"
1964	Dr. Kildare	Jesse Kamba, MD	Episode: "The Elusive Dik-Dik"
1965	The Fugitive	Avery	Episode: "Conspiracy of Silence"
1986	The Cosby Show	Homer	2 episodes
