= Duane Jones =

American actor (1937–1988)

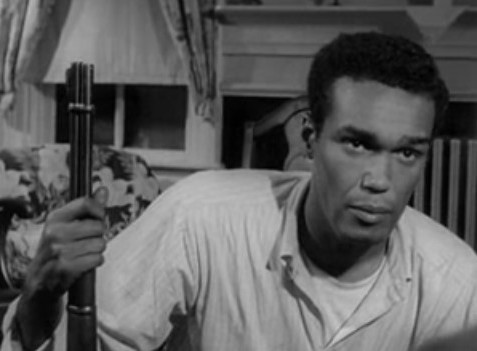
- Jones in Night of the Living Dead (1968)
- Born: Duane Lionel Jones; April 11, 1937; New York City, U.S.
- Died: July 22, 1988 (aged 51); Mineola, New York, U.S.
- Education: University of Pittsburgh (B.A.); New York University (M.A.)
- Occupation: Actor
- Years active: 1967–1988

Duane Lionel Jones (April 11, 1937 – July 22, 1988) was an American actor. He was best known for his lead role as Ben in the 1968 horror film Night of the Living Dead. He was later director of the Maguire Theater at the State University of New York at Old Westbury, and the artistic director of the Richard Allen Center for Culture and Art in Manhattan.

== Early life and education ==
Jones was born in New York City to Mildred Jones (née Gordon). He had a sister, Marva (later Marva Brooks), and a brother, Henry. He graduated from the University of Pittsburgh with a B.A. and studied at the Sorbonne in Paris, before training as an actor in New York City. He later completed an M.A. in Communications at New York University in between shooting Night of the Living Dead.

Prior to becoming an actor, Jones was a Phelps-Stokes exchange scholar in Niger and taught literature at Long Island University. He created English-language training programs for the Peace Corps and helped design Harlem Preparatory School, where he headed the English department.

== Career ==
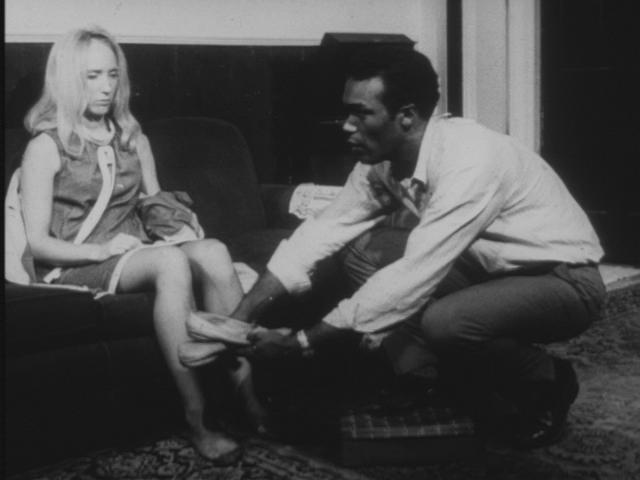
Jones alongside Judith O'Dea in Night of the Living Dead.

His role in the 1968 film Night of the Living Dead marked the first time an African-American actor was cast as the star and hero of a horror film, and one of the first times in American cinema where an important role was given to a Black actor when the script did not explicitly call for one. While some saw the casting as significant, director George A. Romero stated that Jones's ethnicity was not a factor in his casting; Romero cast him simply because "Jones was the best actor we met to play Ben."

Jones continued working in film after Night of the Living Dead in Ganja & Hess (1973), Losing Ground (1982), and Beat Street (1984), among others.

From 1972 to 1976, Jones oversaw the literature department at Antioch College. He was subsequently executive director of the Black Theatre Alliance, a federation of theater companies, from 1976 through 1981, and continued working as a theater actor and director until his death in 1988. As executive director of the Richard Allen Center for Culture and Art (RACCA), he promoted African-American theater. He also taught acting styles at the American Academy of Dramatic Arts in New York City. After leaving the American Academy of Dramatic Arts, he taught a select group of students privately in Manhattan, by invitation only. His hand-selected students were of diverse ethnic backgrounds. The students were picked from his Acting Styles classes at American Academy of Dramatic Arts.

== Death ==
Jones died of cardiopulmonary arrest at Winthrop-University Hospital in Mineola, Long Island, New York, on July 22, 1988, aged 51. He was cremated and his ashes given to his family.

== Legacy ==
The Duane L. Jones Recital Hall at the State University of New York at Old Westbury is named after him. In the zombie comic book series The Walking Dead, the character Duane Jones is named in his honor.

== Filmography ==
Year	Title	Role	Notes
1968	Night of the Living Dead	Ben	
1973	Ganja & Hess	Doctor Hess Green	Also released as Blood Couple
1982	Losing Ground	Duke	
1984	Beat Street	Robert	
1986	Vampires	Charles Harmon	
1988	To Die For	Simon Little	Posthumously released
1988	Negatives	Charles Harmon	Archive footage from Vampires
1989	Fright House	Charles Harmon	Archive footage from Vampires; Segment: "Abadon"; Final film role
