= Conjure Wife =

1943 horror novel by Fritz Leiber

- 1953 Twayne hardcover edition
- Author: Fritz Leiber
- Language: English
- Genre: Fantasy
- Publisher: Street & Smith Publications for Unknown Worlds
- Publication date: April 1943 (in Unknown Worlds), 1952 (as a novel)
- Publication place: United States

Conjure Wife (1943) is a supernatural horror novel by American writer Fritz Leiber. Its premise is that witchcraft flourishes as an open secret among women. The story is told from the point of view of a small-town college professor who discovers that his wife is a witch.

This novel was the first by Fritz Leiber and was first published in the April 1943 edition of Unknown. It is said to have been the inspiration for at least three films: Weird Woman (1944), Night of the Eagle (also known as Burn, Witch, Burn!) (1962), and Witches' Brew (also known as Which Witch is Which?) (1980).

In 2019, the novel was awarded the "Retro" Hugo Award for Best Novel.

== Plot ==
Tansy Saylor is the wife of an up-and-coming young sociology professor at a small, conservative American college. She is also a witch. Her husband, Norman, discovers this one day while rummaging through her dressing table: he finds vials of graveyard dirt, packets of hair and fingernail clippings from their acquaintances, and other evidence of her witchcraft. He confronts Tansy, and manages to convince her that her faith in magic is a result of superstition and neurosis. Tansy burns her charms; and Norman's luck immediately goes sour. He realizes that he had been protected, up till now, by Tansy's charms, and that as a result of his meddling, they are both now powerless to counteract the spells and charms of the other witches all around them.

== Critical response ==
The novel is widely acknowledged to be a classic of modern horror fiction.

It was included in David Pringle's Modern Fantasy: The 100 Best Novels (1988). Pringle wrote:

Conjure Wife is a frightening and at the same time amusing novel, based on the paranoid male’s notion that all women are really witches. It has dated in certain obvious ways — one is much more aware nowadays of the sexism and racism implicit in the whole basis of the narrative — but nevertheless it remains a highly original, and seminal, tale of the supernatural.

Conjure Wife is included in Fantasy: The 100 Best Books by James Cawthorn and Michael Moorcock. The authors wrote:

Leiber skillfully Adds the elements of a mystery story to his supernatural struggle. The powers of his deadliest opponent include the ability to transfer personalities, or souls, from body to body. Who, at the critical moment, is who, and who is to be saved or destroyed? The traditional denouement in the presence of all suspects gains a new and grizzly twist.

Conjure Wife was also included in Horror: The 100 Best Books.

In The Encyclopedia of Fantasy, David Langford described it as "an effective exercise in the paranoid."

Damon Knight wrote

Conjure Wife, by Fritz Leiber, is easily the most frightening and (necessarily) the most thoroughly convincing of all modern horror stories ... Leiber develops [the witchcraft] theme with the utmost dexterity, piling up alternate layers of the mundane and outré, until at the story's real climax, the shocker at the end of Chapter 14, I am not ashamed to say that I jumped an inch out of my seat ... Leiber has never written anything better.

Anthony Boucher and McComas similarly lauded the novel as "one of the best of all novels on witchcraft survivals in the enlightened modern world." P. Schuyler Miller described it as "one of those classics we talk about so glibly," despite finding the denouement less effective than the setup. The New York Times reviewer Basil Davenport noted it was marked by "real excitement".

Everett F. Bleiler found Conjure Wife to be "nicely handled as a suspense story, although Saylor's psychology is a little simplistic."

== Publication ==
Conjure Wife was originally published in the April 1943 volume of Unknown Worlds. An "expanded and revised" version was published by Twayne Publishers in its Witches Three anthology in 1952, then issued as a stand-alone novel in 1953. The latter version has been reprinted many times, in both hardcover and paperback editions, by a variety of publishers, including Ace Books, Tom Doherty Associates, Penguin Books, and Award Publications.
